= Cinebook =

British publishing company

Cinebook Ltd
- Founded: 2005
- Founder: Olivier Cadic
- Country of origin: UK
- Headquarters location: Canterbury, Kent
- Distribution: Turnaround Publisher Services (UK, Europe); Simon & Schuster, Diamond Comics Distributors (North America); book&volume (Australia); South Pacific Books Imports (New Zealand); Topline Book Distributors (South Africa); Publishers Marketing Services, Select Books (Singapore)
- Publication types: Comics
- Official website: Cinebook.co.uk

Cinebook Ltd is a British publishing company that publishes comic albums and graphic novels. It describes itself as "the 9th art publisher," the 9th art being comics in continental Europe, especially France, Belgium and Italy.

They typically translate Franco-Belgian comics – predominantly originating from the Franco-Belgian comic publishers Dargaud, Dupuis and Le Lombard – into English and have also issued an original series about the French Queen Marguerite de Valois, also known as Queen Margot. Cinebook works with a team of translators, including native speakers of French, British English and American English.

== Titles ==
=== Softcover album series ===
So far, the company has published, or plans to publish, the following comic series in softcover editions:

Series	Writer(s)	Artist(s)
Worlds of Aldebaran: Aldebaran; Betelgeuse	Léo	Léo
Alpha	Renard	Jigounov
The Bellybuttons	Maryse Dubuc	Marc Delafontaine ("Delaf")
Billy and Buddy	Jean Roba	Jean Roba
Blake and Mortimer	Edgar P. Jacobs	Edgar P. Jacobs
The Bluecoats	Cauvin	Lambil
Buck Danny	Francis Bergèse	Francis Bergèse
Cedric	Cauvin	Laudec
The Chimpanzee Complex	Richard Marazano	Jean-Michel Ponzio
Clifton	De Groot	Turk
Crusade	Jean Dufaux	Philippe Xavier
Darwin's Diaries	Sylvain Runberg	Ocaña
Ducoboo	Zidrou	Godi
Gomer Goof	André Franquin	André Franquin
Green Manor	Vehlmann	Bodart
Insiders	Jean-Claude Bartoll	Renaud Garreta
IR$	Stephen Desberg	Bernard Vrancken
Iznogoud	Goscinny	Tabary
Lady S	Jean Van Hamme	Aymond
Largo Winch	Jean Van Hamme	Philippe Francq
Long John Silver	Xavier Dorison	Mathieu Lauffray
Lucky Luke	Goscinny; Various	Morris; Achdé
Melusine	Clarke	Gilson
Orbital	Sylvain Runberg	Serge Pellé
Pandora Box	Alcante	(multiple)
Papyrus	De Gieter	De Gieter
Queen Margot	Cadic & Gheysens	Derenne
The Rugger Boys	Beka	Poupard
Scared to Death	Vanholme	Mauricet
The Scorpion	Stephen Desberg	Enrico Marini
Spirou & Fantasio	André Franquin et al.; Tome	André Franquin; Janry
Thorgal	Jean Van Hamme	Rosiński
Valerian and Laureline	Pierre Christin	Jean-Claude Mézières
Wayne Shelton	Jean Van Hamme	Christian Denayer
Western	Jean Van Hamme	Grzegorz Rosiński
Wind in the Willows	Michel Plessix	Michel Plessix
XIII	Jean Van Hamme	William Vance
Yakari	Job	Derib
Yoko Tsuno	Roger Leloup	Roger Leloup

=== Hardcover series ===
- Valerian: The Complete Collection

During 2017 and 2018 the British publisher Cinebook Limited published a hardcover collection of the series titled; Valerian: The Complete Collection, spread over seven volumes, with three to four stories in each book. These volumes are in full original color, printed on glossy paper and measure 220 mm × 290 mm.

Volumes
Vol.	Title	Included stories	Release date	ISBN
1	Valerian: The Complete Collection Volume 1	0–2: (Bad dreams, The City of Shifting Waters, Empire of a Thousand Planets)	May 2017	978-1-84918-352-9
2	Valerian: The Complete Collection Volume 2	3–5: (The Land Without Stars, Welcome to Alflolol, Birds of the Master)	July 2017	978-1-84918-356-7
3	Valerian: The Complete Collection Volume 3	6–8: (Ambassador of the Shadows, On False Earths, Heroes of the Equinox)	July 2017	978-1-84918-357-4
4	Valerian: The Complete Collection Volume 4	9–12: (Chatelet Station - Destination Cassiopeia, Brooklyn line - Terminus Cosmos, The Ghost of Inverloch, The Wrath of Hypsis)	April 2018	978-1-84918-391-8
5	Valerian: The Complete Collection Volume 5	13–15: (On the Frontiers, The Living Weapons, The Circles of Power)	June 2018	978-1-84918-400-7
6	Valerian: The Complete Collection Volume 6	16–18: (Hostages of Ultralum, Orphan of the Stars, In Uncertain Times)	August 2018	978-1-84918-411-3
7	Valerian: The Complete Collection Volume 7	19–21: (At the Edge of the Great Void, The Order of the Stones, The Time Opener)	October 2018	978-1-84918-416-8

In 2019 Cinebook launched a hardcover book series collecting the complete output of Lucky Luke.

- Lucky Luke – The Complete Collection

== Awards ==
Olivier Cadic was given the French National Order of Merit, according to the Birmingham Mail this award is:

A vindication of his work to make an important part of French culture available in the English-speaking world through Cinebook, as the ambassador himself noted when noting the publisher had now printed twice as many Lucky Luke books in the last three years as had been published in the previous fifty.

== Censorship ==
A 2013 article from DowntheTubes.net discusses how Cinebook have been criticized for the fact that many of their releases are censored from the original works, a practice which usually affects comics which depict nudity, including books which in their original form were released for adult target audiences with an appropriate age rating.
