= Lion Comics =

Tamil comic book series

Lion and Muthu Comics at a Book Store

Lion Comics (Tamil: லயன் காமிக்ஸ்) is a Tamil comic book series published by Prakash Publishers, in South India. Both Lion Comics and its sister publication 'Muthu Comics' (முத்து காமிக்ஸ்), are published monthly in Tamil language. In fact, Muthu Comics is the forerunner to Lion Comics, even though the latter has taken over as the leading brand of the comic publication. The Editor/publisher of the concern, Mr. S Vijayan, is based in Sivakasi, where the comics publishing house also is based out.

Almost all of the stories published are Tamil translations of primarily European and rarely some American comic series, including those from the British Comics Publisher of the same name - Lion. Tex Willer, along with Lucky Luke and Mike Blueberry are the most popular cowboy heroes; Steel Claw and The Spider were the more popular superheroes during the comic house's best of times.

== Related publications ==
Muthu Comics (முத்து காமிக்ஸ்), Thigil Comics (திகில் காமிக்ஸ்), Mini-Lion (மினி லயன்) and Junior-Lion (ஜூனியர் லயன்) are some of the other publications from the same concern. Comics Classics is the latest addition with re-printed run of more famous titles published in the past, during the so-called Golden Age of Tamil comics.

== History ==
The first issue of Muthu comics was published in 1971 as a monthly (128 pages, INR 0.90). It featured The Steel Claw (இரும்புக்கை மாயாவி in Tamil). Although there had been a few comics publishers in Tamil from the early 60s, the entry of Muthu Comics marks the beginning of the Golden Age of Tamil Comics. Muthu comics enjoyed a warm welcome from the Tamil audience and with M.Soundrapandian, continued to grow steadily over the years.

The first among the Comic House's expansion ventures - a weekly (முத்து காமிக்ஸ் வாரமலர) - was started in the early eighties, which was subsequently withdrawn after a few years. In 1984, after a brief lull, when there was no comics publications in the market, came Lion Comics (லயன் காமிக்ஸ). Lion Comics was a creation of Mr.Soundrapandian's son Vijayan. Vijayan became the Chief-editor of Lion comics when he was seventeen.

Expansion continued with the launch of the Junior-Lion (ஜூனியர் லயன்), Mini-Lion (மினி லயன்) and Thigil comics (திகில் காமிக்ஸ்), all of which were published in parallel, on a monthly basis. Festivals like Diwali, Pongal and summer holidays promised special Digest Issues, which were bigger and costlier than the regular comic. These were the Golden years in Tamil Comics history.

1984 is also the year in which the Other major player in Tamil Comics - Rani Comics - was started by the ThinaThanthi (தினத்தந்தி in Tamil) group of Publishers. Rani comics would grow over to become the dominant market player for the next ten years or so.

Mid-eighties - The launch of private Television Channels and Satellite / Cable TV Public-access television, marked the beginning of the spiraling decline in the readership in the State, and Comics readership was no different. Children and youth were increasingly drawn into the new world introduced through Television media.

During the worst periods of hardship, readers were plagued with problems such as shortage of quality story/art work, non-availability in local stores and frequent delays in releasing scheduled titles. From 2012, there has been a revival of sorts, with regular monthly issues, with negligible timeline misses.

One by one, most of the local comic publishers perished, in this changed market place. Rani Comics bowed out with its 500th issue; Mini, Junior and Thigil comics were also eventually stopped, and later their comic characters or series were brought under the two "last men standing" brands, Lion and Muthu comics.

=== 2000 to 2011: The Dog Years ===
As of 2008, the Official Lioncomics.com website is no longer owned by Prakash Publishers. The site was up for renewal, and the publishers didn't show interest in keeping their presence on the Web, even though they continue to release Lion Comics and Muthu, often at prolonged gaps in between each issues.

There have been a brief revival in the comics interests with the publication of 'Comics Classics' - reprinted popular stories of yesteryear. Lion Comics continues to penetrate beyond its niche audience, but always is pulled down, by its irregular publishing schedule.

The current issue of Lion Comics, is their biggest venture yet. A Jumbo Edition carrying one of their lead characters, XIII. It was originally scheduled for 2009, then was pushed to various dates in 2010, and has finally been released in October 2010. The issue is priced at INR 200, marking the costliest edition ever released by the comic publishing house. They have already attained quite an amount of success with their three specials, which were each priced INR 100, in past years. This issue is undoubtedly one of the fattest comic book releases ever in India, and probably the world over (in terms of a complete series in one volume). Sadly, that issue also marked a long period of absence from Tamil Comics publishers, all through the year, with an exception one INR 10 issue which immediately followed the Jumbo Special.

=== 2012 onwards: The Renaissance ===
2012 has really been a comeback year for the southern comic franchise, with regular monthly editions, and appearance in major book fairs in the city. They were also seen in India's own Comic Con, in September 2012, in Bengaluru.

The publishers have also started selling their books (available prints) through eBay India.

In January 2013, Mr. S.Vijayan released mega special issue "MUTHU NEVER BEFORE SPECIAL" with 456 pages (400 pages in color) @ Rs. 400 to celebrate the 40th year of Muthu Comics. In 2015, Lion comics also published Captain Tiger's (Mike Blueberry) "MINNUM MARANAM complete saga" [Blueberry -(complete 11 Editions from Chihuahua Pearl(13th book) to Arizona Love(23rd book)] with 596 pages @ Rs. 1000 in April Chennai Book fair, where "MINNUM MARANAM complete saga" becomes landmark book in Tamil comics history and holds the record of Costliest book in Tamil Comics History.

During August 2015 Muthu comics celebrated its 350th book by releasing Classic Cartoon Collection(CCC), The Smurfs was introduced as part of CCC to mark Muthu comics 350. The book was released in Erode book fair(EBF).

Long-awaited (Mister Blueberry/OK Corral series) was released during the 2016 Chennai Book fair. Tamil version of என் பெயர் டைகர்(Mister Blueberry/OK Corral series) released as single album whole series (from Dargaud Blueberry series book #24 to #28). As first ever try, Muthu comics released this book in both B/W and color version at same time.

Tamil version of Blueberry-Fort navajo (single album of 5parts) was released during the Erode book fair 2017, its first-ever color reprint of same by Lionmuthu comics. The book seems splendid hit as people approached book fair stalls (erode, CBE, etc..) during 2017 returning empty-handed due to sold-out boards for இரத்தக் கோட்டை.

Book name	Price	Released date
MUTHU NEVER BEFORE SPECIAL	400	2012
Diwali Special	100	2013
Hot n Cool Special	100	2013
Lucky Special 1	100	2013
Prince Special 1	100	2013
Jhonny Special 1	100	2013
Double Thrill Special	100	2013
Thanga Kallarai	100	2013
Tiger Special 1	100	2013
Ratha Thadam	100	2013
கார்சனின் கடந்தகாலம்..!(Il Passato di Carson)	100	2014
The Lion Magnum Special	500	2014
KING SPECIAL - Vallavargal Veelvadhillai	100	2014
மின்னும் மரணம்! (MINNUM MARANAM The Complete Saga)	1000	2015
Lion 250	450	2015
Classic Cartoon Collection(Muthu Comics 350)	250	2015
என் பெயர் டைகர்(Mr.Blueberry/OK Corral series)	450	2016
என் பெயர் டைகர்(Mr.Blueberry/OK Corral series)(B/W)	250	2016
பழி வாங்கும் புயல்-TEXWILLER	175	2016
Lion 32 Aandumalar-(Reporter Johnny, Bernard Prince, Betty Barnowsky- mystery final chapter)	200	2016
Lion 300	300	2017
இரத்தக் கோட்டை(Blueberry-Fort navajo)	575	2017

== Featured heroes ==
Some of the more popular comic heroes introduced to Tamil audience were

Character	Tamil Name	Country
Barracuda & Frollo	Lawrence - David (சி.ஐ.டி லாரன்ஸ் - டேவிட்)	?
Bernard Prince	Prince	Belgian
Blueberry (comics)	Tiger (கேப்டன டைகர்)	French
Bruno Brazil	Bruno Brazil (ப்ரூனோ ப்ரேஸில்)	French
Largo Winch	Largo Winch	Belgian
Buz Sawyer	Charlie	American
Chick Bill	Chick Bill (சிக் பில்)	Belgian
Diabolik	Diabolik	Italian
Grimm's	Karupu Kilzavi(கறுப்புக் கிழவி: Grimm's Ghost Stories)	American (Gold Key Comics)
Dr. Kildare	Dr. Kildare	?
Dylan Dog	Dடைலன் டாக்	Italian
Flash Gordon	Flash Gordon (பிளாஷ் கார்டன்)	American
Iznogoud	mathi illa mandhri (மதியில்லா மந்திரி)	Franco-Belgian
Johnny Hazard	Wing Commander Johnny	?
Johnny Nero	Johnny Nero	British
Lucky Luke	Lucky Luke (லக்கி லூக்)	Franco-Belgian
Mandrake the Magician	Mandhiravaathi Mandrake (மாண்ட்ரேக்)	American
Martin Mystère	Marma Manithan Martin (மர்ம மனிதன் மார்ட்டின)	Italian
Modesty Blaise	Modesty Blaise (மாடஸ்டி பிளைஸி)	British
Ric Hochet	Reporter Johnny	French
Rip Kirby	Rip Kirby	American
Robot Archie	Robot Archie (இரும்பு மனிதன் ஆர்ச்சி)	British
Secret Agent X-9 (Phil Corrigan)	Phil Corrigan	American
Tex Willer	Tex Willer (டெக்ஸ்வில்லர்)	Italian
The Cisco Kid	The Cisco Kid (சிஸ்கோ கிட்)	American
The Phantom	Maayavi (மாயாவி)	American
The Spider	Spider (ஸ்பைடர்)	British
The Steel Claw	Irumbukai Maayavi (இரும்புக்கை மாயாவி)	British
XIII (Thirteen)	XIII	Franco-Belgian
Bouncer	Bouncer (பௌன்சர்)	Franco-Belgian
Magic Wind	Magic Wind(மேஜிக் விண்ட்)	Italian
Thorgal	Thorgal(தோர்கல்)	Belgian
Léonard (comics)	Léonardo (லியனார்டோ )	Belgian
Clifton (comics)	Kernel Clifton(கர்னல் க்ளிப்டன்)	Franco-Belgian
The Smurfs	Smurfs(ஸ்மர்ஃப்ஸ்)	Belgian
Rantanplan	Rin Tin Can(ரின் டின் கேன்)	Franco-Belgian comics
Julia (comics) Kendall	Julia Kendall(ஜூலியா கேன்டல்)	ItalianJeremiah (comics)
Jeremiah (comics)	Jeremiah(ஜெரேமியா)	French
Benoît Brisefer	Benny Breakiron (Benny)	Belgian
Rantanplan	Rantanplan(ரின்டின்கேன்)	Franco-Belgian
ஜேசன் ப்ரைஸ் Jason Price	ஜேசன் ப்ரைஸ்	
Durango (Comic)	Durango (ட்யுராங்கோ)	
Lady S	Lady S	French

There were also occasional appearances of Batman & Joker, James Bond 007, Judge Dredd and Sexton Blake.

== Featured graphic novels ==
following are some of the best international comic novels published by Lion comics in recent past

Book name	Tamil Name	Country
Western (comics)	எமனின் திசை மேற்கு !	Franco-Belgian
Green Manor	Green Manor	Franco-Belgian
it:Le storie #6 Ritorno a Berlino	இறந்த காலம் இறப்பதில்லை(part of LMS)	Italian
Le Manuscrit interdit	தேவ இரகசியம் தேடலுக்கல்ல	Franco-Belgian
Les Oubliés d'Annam	ஒரு சிப்பாயின் சுவடுகளில்...!	Franco-Belgian
Comptine d'Halloween	இரவே..இருளே..கொல்லாதே..!	Franco-Belgian
Dent d'ours	வானமே எங்கள் வீதி..!	Franco-Belgian
La Grande Évasion - La Ballade de Tilman Razine	விடுதலையே உன் விலையென்ன ?	Franco-Belgian

== Role of the editor ==
It must be stressed here that unlike the rest-of-the-world, in India, there is still the dominant view that comics 'are just for kids'. Successfully running a comics publishing house in such social milieu speaks greatly of the determination and the sense-of-purpose of the publishers. Mr.S Vijayan, the editor has a good chemistry with the readers, through his 'Hotline' and 'Comics Time' forewords that appears in every issue of Lion comics.

Old issues of Lion and Muthu comics were stacked up in their warehouse at Sivakasi, which used to be a cynosure of eyes for those who visit the place. Reports of theft of comics, and illegal scans of those, have prompted the administrators to disallow access to this Treasure Chest, for all Tamil Comics lovers. Mr. Soundarapandan says that upgrading the ware house into a library is economically not feasible, due to the dwindling population that reads comics.

Recently, Mr. Vijayan was interviewed for South India-based Kalaignar TV, where he went over his comics passion and the business in general. In the Interview, he also stressed on bringing the Lion Comics official back online by the end of 2009, to keep the readers abreast of the latest happenings. But it took until 2012, when he launched his personal blog, and a website. While the website is not maintained up-to-date, he is more regular in his blog, often reviewing the old titles, and sharing the news on the upcoming ones. Mr. Vijayan continues to be the "Lone Man Standing", as far as Tamil Comics are concerned.
