= Queen Margot =

Queen Margot or La Reine Margot may refer to:

- Margaret of Valois (1553–1615), queen consort of Navarre and later also of France
- La Reine Margot (novel), 1845 French novel by Alexandre Dumas about Margaret of Valois
- La Reine Margot (1954 film), French film based on Alexandre Dumas' novel
- La Reine Margot (1994 film), French film also based on Alexandre Dumas' novel
- Queen Margot (comics), Franco-Belgian graphic novel series about Margaret of Valois
- Queen Margot (TV series), a Russian television series
