= XIII (comics) =

Belgian comic book series

- Cover to the first album (1984)
- Date: 1984
- No. of issues: 28 as of 2024
- Page count: 44 pages
- Publisher: Dargaud; Cinebook, Ltd (since 2010)

Creative team
- Writers: Jean Van Hamme, Yves Sente
- Artists: William Vance, Jean Giraud, Youri Jigounov
- Creator: Jean Van Hamme

Original publication
- Language: French

XIII ("Thirteen") is a Belgian comic albums series about an amnesiac who seeks to discover his past. It was created by writer Jean Van Hamme and artist William Vance. It is currently being written by Yves Sente and Youri Jigounov. The storyline of the first five volumes was adapted into a video game in 2003, also titled XIII, with a remake being released in 2020. A Canadian television film based on the series, XIII: The Conspiracy, was released in 2008. It was followed in 2011 by two seasons of a TV series, each 13 episodes, called XIII: The Series.

== Main characters ==
Main character Jason MacLane or XIII

- XIII: The title character suffers from total amnesia. He soon discovers that he is suspected of the assassination of President William Sheridan. Throughout the albums he tries to regain his memory and to find out the true facts surrounding the assassination of the president. Although his memory does not return, he gradually learns more about who he is. His real name is Jason Mullway. However, because he was adopted at a young age (after the death of his mother and the disappearance of his father) by Jonathan MacLane, a cousin of his father Sean Mullway, he officially bears the name Jason MacLane.
- General Benjamin (Ben) Carrington: He holds a senior military position in the Pentagon. He is convinced that XIII is innocent and he helps him regain his memory.
- Jones: She is Carrington's assistant and she was also trained by him. As a permanent partner, she supports XIII everywhere. She is a skilled pilot, both for airplanes and helicopters. While she is still a lieutenant in the first stories, she has now risen to the rank of colonel.
- Mongoose: XIII's arch-enemy is an assassin who fears nothing. Initially they call him Schreiner, because he is an apprentice to a Berlin carpenter, this is revealed in XIII Mystery: The Mongoose. He was hired by Number I to kill XIII. XIII lost his memory due to a bullet from the Mongoose.
- Colonel Amos: He had to solve the murder of William Sheridan and first suspected XIII, who was able to escape. After it became clear to him that XIII was innocent, he helped him instead of arresting him.
- Wally Sheridan: US President. His brother William was murdered by Steve Rowland on behalf of Number I.
- Betty Barnowski: a -now former- soldier who met XIII during an undercover mission and who has helped him regularly since then.
- Marquis De Préseau: an old, friendly French aristocrat who often comes to XIII's aid. Through XIII he met Betty Barnowski, with whom he has been in a relationship ever since.
- Felicity Brown: a dangerous opportunist who does not shy away from violence to get her way. Rather coincidentally, her path crosses that of XIII several times, and they get in each other's way.
- Stephen G. Dundee: Appears only in the 13th album. It is remarkable that he plays a role in both XIII and another comics series, Largo Winch.

== Volumes 1–5 ==
The series begins with a amnesiac man awakening to find himself washed ashore in the East Coast. The only clues to his past are a tattoo of the Roman numerals "XIII" on his collarbone and a photo of himself with a woman, who is identified as Kim Rowland, widow of US Army captain Steve Rowland. Volumes 1 through 5 deal with "XIII" searching for his identity and past. He finds himself hunted by a contract killer, the "Mongoose", who works for a mysterious organization known as XX, which aims to mount a coup against the US government. XIII is rescued from XX's assassins by Colonel Amos of the FBI, who confronts XIII with video evidence that shows XIII assassinating the President.

In the second volume, XIII is captured by General Carrington and his aide, Lieutenant Jones. Carrington confirms that XIII is Rowland, and further explains that Rowland was a member of a special operations unit called Special Assault and Destroying Sections (SPADS). Carrington had been commander of SPADS when Rowland was supposedly killed in action two years earlier. Because XIII's amnesia prevents him from identifying who sponsored the President's assassination, Amos lets him go. XIII reunites with his father and his uncle, but they are both murdered by XIII's young, gold-digging stepmother Felicity, who frames him after harming herself. XIII escapes the police with Carrington's help and meets Kim, an XX member known as "XVII", who reveals that XIII is not Steve Rowland. XIII is arrested by the police and Kim disappears. XIII is found guilty for the murders and sent to a maximum security prison.

The third volume finds Amos, still pursuing his investigation, realizing that XIII was a body double for the real Steve Rowland. Amos requests Carrington's help to identify people who have been trained as top-level special operators and match XIII's physique; Amos's aim is to discover XIII's true identity. Carrington provides the papers of about twenty people. One, named Ross Tanner, has been missing for two years. Amos decides to leave XIII in prison to have his amnesia treated. The treatment fails, and the Mongoose tries to have XIII killed in the prison. Carrington helps XIII break out.

Volume 4 begins with Amos finding that Carrington had invented the Tanner identity and suspecting him of being part of the conspiracy to kill the President. XIII, under the name of Ross Tanner, has been hidden by Carrington in a SPADS training facility in the fictitious Latin American country of San Miguel. Amos continues to delve into the files and learns that Rowland was murdered shortly after the assassination. Amos now assumes that Rowland was the real assassin, and is confused about XIII's real role, but he exposes Judge Allenby, the head of the investigation, as one of the conspirators. Amos interrogates Allenby, who is killed by the Mongoose's assassin; Amos himself is rescued by Kim. Meanwhile, a female SPADS Sergeant named Betty Barnowsky reveals to XIII that she saw Rowland in Eastown after his alleged death, in the company with SPADS Colonel Seymour McCall. XIII, Barnowsky, and Jones escape an assassination attempt by McCall but end up lost in the San Miguel jungle.

Kim takes Amos to Carrington and National Intelligence Director Carl Heideger, who reveal that, after faking his death in the helicopter crash, Rowland contacted Kim and forced her to be a member of the conspiracy. Kim, not sharing the conspiracy's ideology, and herself a former secret agent, secretly alerted her former boss, Heideger. Despite having this information, however, Heideger was unable to prevent the assassination of the President. Rowland was shot by the Mongoose, but he escaped, mortally wounded, and died shortly after telling Kim what had happened. Heideger and Carrington then came up with a plan to make XX believe that Rowland had survived, hoping to attract the Mongoose's killers, arrest them, and follow their trail to the conspirators. They sourced a man named Jason Fly who was transformed into a Rowland double, but soon after, Fly disappeared, when he was shot and lost his memory, just before the story began. Kim is also revealed to be Carrington's daughter.

At the start of Volume 5, XIII, Jones, and Barnowsky kidnap the Marquis de Préseau, a rich French land owner in San Miguel, to steal his jet to fly back to the US. Meanwhile, Carrington and Heideger have been arrested by the conspirators as they prepare to take over the country during a large-scale military exercise. XIII and the women meet with Amos, who brings them into contact with Walter Sheridan, brother of the assassinated President and himself a candidate for presidency.

Sheridan helps XIII infiltrate the military's center of operations, and, together with President Galbrain, manage to stop the conspiracy at the last moment. The entire conspiracy group, with the exception of the illustrious Number I, has been either killed or captured. Walter is elected President, and Kim remains missing for reasons unknown. At the end of the story, XIII believes he has found his old identity as Jason Fly and is prepared to continue his life normally, even if his memories have not yet returned.

== Volumes 6–8 ==
In the following volumes, XIII takes up the investigation about his past. Volumes 6 and 7 bring XIII to Greenfalls, a snowy town in the Rocky Mountains, where the story revolves around the fate of his father in the McCarthian 1950s. XIII learns that his father, Jonathan Fly, was murdered by the local Klansmen after they found out Fly's real identity was Jonathan McClane, a "red" journalist who had to flee after suffering under McCarthy's witch hunt. The Mongoose still tracks XIII with the blessing of McClane's assassins, but XIII evades the manhunt, gets justice for the murder of his father and manages to arrest the Mongoose, who reveals that he was on Number I's boat when he shot the bullet that made XIII amnesic, but divulges no further information about Number I. The story ends with XIII finally finding his true identity as Jason McClane.

In Volume 8, XIII is approached by President Sheridan to become a special agent and is charged with finding Number I. The Mongoose escapes from custody. XIII tracks down Kim, guessing that she stayed in hiding because she knows Number I's identity. He discovers that one of the boats close to the spot where he was found amnesic is Sheridan's yacht. Meanwhile, Jones investigates further and discovers that Kim had a love child with Sheridan. After passing on this information to XIII, they become convinced that Sheridan was in fact Number I, and used the XX to have his brother killed and propel himself to the Presidency. Sheridan had the child kidnapped to force Kim to marry Rowland, to betray Jason when Heideger's plan threatened to expose him as Number I, and have him lured onto his yacht where XIII was shot by the Mongoose. After trying to release Kim from an island where they believe she is sequestered, XIII and Jones, along with Kim, are caught by the Mongoose, who sinks Sheridan's yacht with an explosive. XIII only manages to rescue Jones, and Kim is presumed dead.

XIII finally faces Sheridan, who has been exposed as Number I. XIII has no evidence or witness against him, however. Sheridan does not assassinate XIII to avoid a new investigation that might expose him, and XIII and Jones leave the country.

== Volumes 9–13 ==
In the following volumes, the action takes place in and around Costa Verde, a small fictional nation in Central America where XIII is led to believe he once led a revolution under the identity of "El Cascador", although El Cascador is supposedly dead. XIII gets involved with revolutionary Maria de los Santos, who claims to have been his wife. In the tenth volume, after freeing her from a prison from which she was awaiting execution, she confirms that he is her husband.

During the revolution, XIII meets an Irish-American expat, Sean Mullway, who claims to be XIII's real father and confirms that XIII is Jason McClane. The history of XIII's Irish descent is revealed, and XIII learns that his mother was the sister of NSA Director Giordino, who accidentally murdered her. The Giordinos are revealed to be a Mafia family. At the end of the volume, XIII is offered amnesty by the US ambassador, who explains that XIII's help is needed; Carrington has apparently gone insane.

In Volume 12, the corrupt President Sheridan is kidnapped by Carrington, who has learned that Sheridan ordered his daughter Kim's death. Carrington and Amos have XIII and Jones capture the Mongoose to get further evidence against Sheridan. In a televised "trial", Sheridan is revealed to the American public as Number I, with XIII and the Mongoose testifying. In the aftermath of the event, Sheridan kills the Mongoose, and Giordino accidentally kills Sheridan.

Volume 13, The XIII Mystery: The Investigation, is a special issue, where two journalists retrace the first twelve issues, clarifying and expanding the storyline.

== Volumes 14–20 ==
While in exile in Costa Verde, XIII and Mullway attempt to find a treasure hidden by their ancestors somewhere in Mexico. Giordino, meanwhile, fabricates evidence claiming that XIII is Seamus O'Neill, an IRA operative who trained under Fidel Castro. As O'Neill, XIII is wanted by the US government, but he again manages to escape. He also survives an assassination attempt by Irina Svetlanova, who has taken over the Mongoose's operation. After many setbacks, the treasure is found and then lost again. Meanwhile, Giordino is removed from duty by the new President, who has received evidence from XIII and Mullway revealing that Giordino is not only connected to the Mafia but also that he killed Sheridan.

Volumes 18 and 19 are the last written by Van Hamme. Volume 18, The Irish Version, was drawn by Jean Giraud, otherwise known as Mœbius. It features as a story within the story, and it is referred to as part of the plot along with The XIII Mystery in Volume 19 The Last Round. This is the prequel to the initial story arc, and it resolves all mysteries surrounding XIII's identity.

XIII has learned his identity, but his memories still have not returned. He seeks medical treatment to uncover them in Volume 20, but Mayflower Day, a secret organization, schemes to keep XIII from unblocking his memory, because of yet another secret in his past.

== A Journey Through Exile and Deception ==
While in exile in Costa Verde, XIII and his trusted ally Mullway embark on a perilous quest to recover a treasure hidden by their ancestors somewhere in Mexico. This journey is fraught with challenges, as fate throws curveballs at every turn. Meanwhile, the enigmatic Giordino manipulates the narrative by fabricating evidence that casts XIII as Seamus O'Neill—an IRA operative who honed his skills under Fidel Castro. This false identity not only makes XIII a target of the US government but also leads to a dramatic escape and survival against all odds.

The tension escalates when Irina Svetlanova, now in command of the Mongoose operation, orchestrates a high-stakes assassination attempt. Despite these relentless threats, XIII manages to dodge danger repeatedly, underscoring his resilience and resourcefulness.

== The Elusive Treasure and Hidden Agendas ==
Amid numerous setbacks, the long-sought treasure is finally discovered—only to be lost again soon after. The twists and turns in the treasure hunt echo the chaotic nature of XIII’s world, where nothing is quite as it seems.

As the political landscape shifts, Giordino’s past misdeeds catch up with him. Evidence surfaces linking him not only to the Mafia but also implicating him in the murder of Sheridan. This development forces the new President to remove Giordino from his position, adding yet another layer of complexity to the plot.

== The Final Chapters by Van Hamme and the Artistic Touch of Mœbius ==
Volumes 18 and 19 stand as the final contributions from writer Van Hamme. Volume 18, titled The Irish Version, is uniquely drawn by Jean Giraud—better known as Mœbius. This installment features a "story within a story," blending the narrative of XIII with an embedded prequel that is further developed in Volume 19, The Last Round. This clever narrative device not only enriches the backstory but also resolves longstanding mysteries about XIII’s true identity.

Even though XIII learns who he is, his memories remain fragmented. In Volume 20, his desperate search for medical treatment to unlock his lost memories is thwarted by Mayflower Day, a secret organization with its own hidden agenda. Their efforts to keep his past concealed hint at even deeper secrets waiting to be unraveled.

== Popularity ==
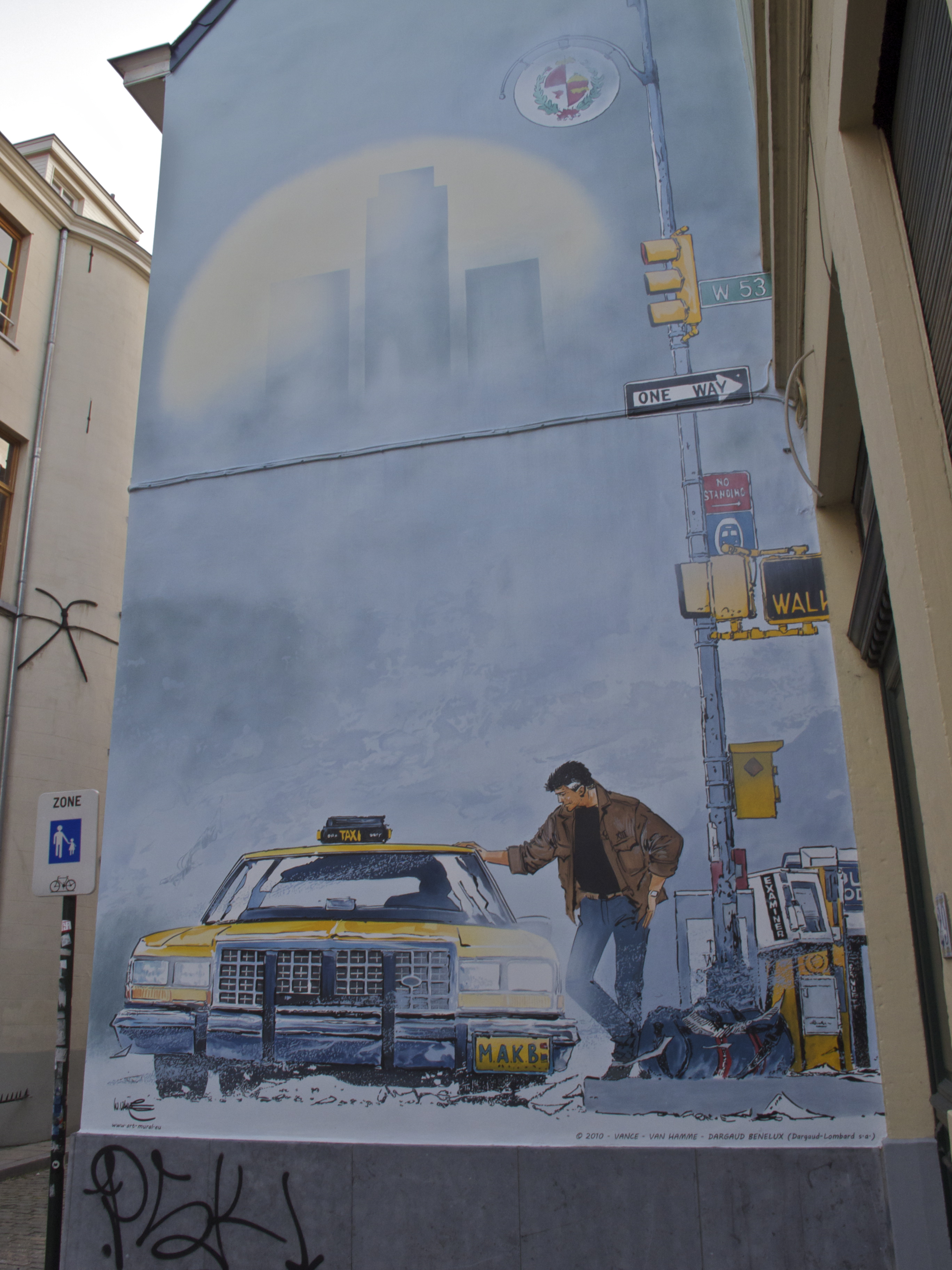
XIII portrayed on a mural on the Rue Philippe de Champagne, as part of the Brussels' Comic Book Route

XIII was released in 1984 as a serial in the popular Spirou magazine, and it was popular among Spirou readers. The first three episodes were released as a single hardcover volume by Dargaud the same year. This continued for later issues, and, by the time of the eighth issue, Thirteen to One, sales of the hardcover had reached 140,000 copies. Promotion for the series included a special draw by the French national lottery in 2000 with 1,500,000 tickets and a €13,000 grand prize.

== Translations ==
XIII was originally written in French, and it was translated into several languages, including English, Dutch, German, Polish, Swedish, Tamil, Serbo-Croatian, and Italian.

== Volumes ==
=== In English ===
- In 1989, XIII was first released in English as Code XIII, but after the first three volumes, publication ended in 1990 when the publisher (Catalan/Comcat) went out of business.
- In 2005, Alias Comics started publishing the title as a series of 32-page monthly comics edited for U.S. audiences. Five issues were released, but #6 was "Cancelled by Publisher" in February 2006. Each issue covered half an album.
- In 2006, the series went to Dabel Brothers Productions. They released the #6 online for free, and the first 144-page volume was released on February 7, 2007, with Marvel Comics, reprinting the first 3 albums.
- Cinebook published the 19 books at the rate of one every two months in the UK. Note, on other continents, the volumes are released three months later.
- Cinebook is also publishing the new series, created by Yves Sente & Youri Jigounov. The first two books, Volumes 19 and 20, were published in November 2014 and February 2015, respectively. Cinebook's translated releases edit the art, removing nudity.

Original Series:

1. The Day of the Black Sun (May 2010) ISBN 978-1-84918-039-9
2. Where the Indian Walks (July 2010) ISBN 978-1-84918-040-5
3. All the Tears of Hell (September 2010) ISBN 978-1-84918-051-1
4. SPADS (November 2010) ISBN 978-1-84918-058-0
5. Full Red (January 2011) ISBN 978-1-84918-065-8
6. The Jason Fly Case (March 2011) ISBN 978-1-84918-073-3
7. The Night of August Third (May 2011) ISBN 978-1-84918-078-8
8. Thirteen to One (July 2011) ISBN 978-1-84918-089-4
9. For Maria (Sept 2011) ISBN 978-1-84918-093-1
10. El Cascador (Nov 2011) ISBN 978-1-84918-102-0
11. Three Silver Watches (Jan 2012) ISBN 978-1-84918-109-9
12. The Trial (March 2012) ISBN 978-1-84918-114-3
13. Top Secret (May 2012) ISBN 978-1-84918-121-1
14. Release the Hounds (July 2012) ISBN 978-1-84918-128-0
15. Operation Montecristo (Sept 2012) ISBN 978-1-84918-134-1
16. Maximilian's Gold (November 2012) ISBN 978-1-84918-139-6
17. The Irish Version (January 2013) ISBN 978-1-84918-145-7
18. The Last Round (March 2013) ISBN 978-1-84918-151-8

New Series:

1. The Day of the Mayflower (November 2014) ISBN 978-1-84918-221-8
2. The Bait (February 2015) ISBN 978-1-84918-238-6
3. Return to Green Falls (May 2016) ISBN 978-1-84918-301-7
4. The Martyr's Message (May 2017) ISBN 978-1-84918-349-9
5. Jason McLane's Inheritance (May 2018) ISBN 978-1-84918-405-2
6. 2,331 Yards (August 2020) ISBN 978-1-84918-543-1
7. Reloaded Memory (October 2022) ISBN 978-1-80044-073-9
8. Cuba, Where It All Began (October 2023) ISBN 978-1-80044-118-7
9. Moscow, Spaso House

XIII Mystery:

1. The Mongoose (August 2014) ISBN 978-1-84918-210-2
2. Irina (October 2021) ISBN 978-1-84918-235-5
3. Little Jones
4. Colonel Amos
5. Steve Rowland
6. Billy Stockton
7. Betty Barnowsky
8. Martha Shoebridge
9. Felicity Brown
10. Calvin Wax
11. Jonathan Fly
12. Alan Smith
13. Judith Warner
14. Traquenards et sentiments

=== Other languages ===
==== Croatian ====
- In 1990s Volume 7 by Bookglobe
- In 2008 Integral #1 (Episodes 1-3) by Bookglobe
- In 2009 Integral #2 (Episodes 4-6) by Bookglobe
- In 2012 Integral #3 (Episodes 7-9) by Bookglobe
- In 2012 Integral #4 (Episodes 10-12) by Bookglobe
- In 2018 Integral #5 (Episodes 14-16) by Bookglobe
- In 2018 Integral #6 (Episodes 17-19) by Bookglobe

==== Hungarian ====
Throughout 2004 and 2005 now defunct publisher Krak Kiadó released the first four volumes. In 2019 Vitanum continued with Volume 5.

==== Polish ====
XIII was first published in Polish in 1991 by Korona. In 2000, the series was taken over by Siedmioróg (vol. 1-13) and in 2007 by Egmont Polska (vol. 14-19). Since 2015, Taurus Media is the Polish publisher of both XIII (since vol. 20) and the spin-off series XIII Mystery.

==== Portuguese ====
- In 1988, XIII began publication in Portugal by Meribérica-Líber. The first three volumes were published over a two-year period, and the series returned in 1997 after a seven-year hiatus. Meribérica published the first nine albums until it went out of business in 2004.
- In 1990, Portuguese newspaper Público (Portugal) started publishing XIII in its Sunday supplement 'Publico Junior'. Eventually, the first 3 books were published in this manner, before 'Publico Junior' was discontinued in 1992.
- From 2006, XIII is being published in Brazil by Panini Comics. Panini is publishing XIII as a monthly series, with two episodes in each issue. Previously available in Brazil were the Portuguese editions published by Meribérica-Liber.

In 2015, in Portugal, Portuguese newspaper "Público" and "Edições Asa II, S.A." published the, then, complete edition of "XIII" in double volumes, each containing two titles. The series has 24 albums, that start with "O Dia do Sol Negro" and ends with "A Mensagem do Mártir".

The first issue The Day of The Black Sun was named O Dia do Sol Negro, the literal translation. The first issue also included a second episode, named Onde Vai o Índio... (Where the Indian Walks), published in May 2006. All Brazilian issues are composed of two albums, except for issue 7, which included the original thirteenth volume, a double-sized album, alone.

==== Serbian ====
- During the 1980s, the first three volumes were published in the monthly Super magazine from publisher Dečje novine.
- In 1990, the first six volumes were published in the monthly Gigant magazine from publisher Dečje novine. Throughout the decade, Politikin Zabavnik magazine also reprinted most of the volumes as part of its comic segment. In 2012, Politikin Zabavnik started reprinting the volumes once again.
- From 2002 to 2009, the first 19 volumes were published through Marketprint.

==== Tamil ====
XIII has been published in Tamil under the title Ratha Padalam by Lion Comics in the state of Tamil Nadu, India.

- XIII had been published as individual volumes from 1 to 10, from 1986 to 2000, by Lion Comics.
- In Oct 2010, a complete set of Volumes 1-18 was released by Lion Comics.
- In Oct 2013, Volumes 20 and 21, combined, were released under the title Thodarum Oru Thedal by Lion Comics.
- In Feb 2015, Volumes 22 and 23, combined, were released under the title Ambin Paadhaiyil by Lion Comics.
- In Sep 2016, Volume 24 was released under the title The End..? by Lion Comics.
- In Aug 2018, a complete set of Volumes 1-18 was released by Lion Comics in color.

== Future ==
Ever since October 2008, Sente has authored Volume 20 of the comic series (Mayflower Day), published in late 2011, alongside new artist Youri Jigounov and have continued ever since, releasing Volume 24 on June 15, 2016.

=== Spin-off ===
A separate comic series called XIII Mystery, which follows and elaborates on some of the supporting characters from the XIII comic series, began by publisher Dargaud on October 3, 2008, with the release of the first issue, The Mongoose. On October 30, 2009, the second issue, Irina, was released. Little Jones was released on November 10, 2010, and Colonel Amos was released in late 2011. Steve Rowland has been published in October 2012.

== Video game adaptations ==
XIII was adapted by Ubisoft as a 2003 first-person shooter video game released for the PlayStation 2, GameCube, Xbox, the PC, and the Apple Macintosh. The plot of the game is an adaptation of the first five volumes of the comic series. A sequel, titled XIII ²: Covert Identity, was released as a side-scrolling platform game for mobile phones by Gameloft in October 2007.

In November 2011, Anuman Interactive released an adventure game based on the series, titled XIII: Lost Identity.

In April 2019, Microids announced a remake of the 2003 game, developed by PlayMagic Ltd for multiple current-gen platforms. It released on November 10, 2020. Due to the remake's poor reception, Microids replaced PlayMagic with the French studio Tower Five to "rework the entire game", with the improved version released on September 13, 2022 as a free update.

== TV series ==
A XIII 2-part TV mini-series called XIII: The Conspiracy and starring Val Kilmer and Stephen Dorff was shown on French premium television channel Canal+ in October 2008. It was shown in other territories in 2009 and is available on DVD. It is based on the first five volumes in the comic book series, and is chronologically followed by a straightforward television series.

In 2011, a TV series called XIII: The Series aired in Canada and France, which is a continuation of the 2008 mini-series. It starred Stuart Townsend and Aisha Tyler. The first season followed the storyline constructed in the aftermath of Volume 5, concentrating on XIII's past as in the comics while the second season develops beyond the plot of all the existing materials with an original story arc unrelated to the source material.

== See also ==
• Belgian comics

• Franco-Belgian comics

• Brussels' Comic Book Route

== Sources ==
- XIII publications in Spirou Archived 2007-02-06 at the Wayback Machine, French Tintin Archived 2010-10-15 at the Wayback Machine, BoDoï Archived 2007-10-15 at the Wayback Machine BDoubliées (in French)

Citations
