= Pandora Box (comics) =

Franco-Belgian comic series

Pandora's Box
- The first book in the series, Pride

Publication information
- Publisher: Dupuis (French); Cinebook (English)
- Format: Finished series
- Genre: Graphic novel for young adults
- No. of issues: 8 (in French); 4 (in English)

Creative team
- Written by: Alcante
- Artist: Multiple

Pandora's Box is a Franco-Belgian comic book series written by Alcante, illustrated by several artists and published by Dupuis in French and Cinebook in English.

== Volumes ==
1. L'Orgueil - Jan 2005 ISBN 2-8001-3627-8 (illustrated by Didier Pagot)
2. La Paresse - Jan 2005 ISBN 2-8001-3628-6 (illustrated by Vujadin Radovanović)
3. La Gourmandise - May 2005 ISBN 2-8001-3630-8 (illustrated by Steven Dupré)
4. La Luxure - May 2005 ISBN 2-8001-3629-4 (illustrated by Roland Pignault)
5. L'Avarice - Oct 2005 ISBN 2-8001-3745-2 (illustrated by Erik Juszezak)
6. L'Envie - Oct 2005 ISBN 2-8001-3746-0 (illustrated by Alain Henriet)
7. La Colère - Mar 2006 ISBN 2-8001-3747-9 (illustrated by Damour)
8. L'Espérance - Mar 2006 ISBN 2-8001-3748-7 (illustrated by Didier Pagot)

== Translations ==
Since March 2009, Cinebook has been publishing Pandora's Box. The following volumes have been released so far:

1. Pride - March 2009 ISBN 978-1-905460-81-6
2. Sloth - Nov. 2009 ISBN 978-1-84918-006-1
3. Gluttony - Feb. 2010 ISBN 978-1-84918-019-1
4. Greed - August 2010 ISBN 978-1-84918-047-4
5. Envy - May 2011 ISBN 978-1-84918-079-5
