= Alpha (Lombard) =

- The first book in the series, The Exchange (1996)

Publication information
- Publisher: Le Lombard (French); Cinebook (English)
- Format: Ongoing series
- Genre: Graphic novel for adults
- Publication date: 1996
- No. of issues: 13 (in French); 4 (in English)

Creative team
- Written by: Pascal Renard
- Artist(s): Youri Jigounov

Alpha is a Franco-Belgian comics series about a CIA operative written by Pascal Renard, illustrated by Youri Jigounov and published by Le Lombard in French and Cinebook in English.

== Characters ==
Alpha: Following brilliant studies in international law, Alpha was a non-commissioned officer in a special tactical squadron of the US Air Force before working for the CIA.

He respects the principles of justice, which sometimes leads him to oppose the CIA bureaucracy.

When faced with a decision that could jeopardise his career, he prefers not to reveal anything to anyone.

An attractive man, he has certainly had several affairs with different women, including a major one with one of his targets, Anastasiya Vladimirovna Donkova. He then fell in love with Sheena, his team-mate, but only declared his love for her belatedly.

Sheena Ferguson: She appears for the first time in the fourth volume. She is of Vietnamese origin but was adopted and brought up by an American family, the Fergusons, hence her surname. She respects hierarchy. She loves Alpha, but respects his desire not to get involved.

== Volumes ==
1. L'échange (May 1996)
2. Clan Bogdanov (May 1997)
3. Le salaire des loups (April 1998)
4. La liste (April 1999)
5. Sanctions (October 2000)
6. L'émissaire (April 2002)
7. Snow White, 30 secondes! (October 2003)
8. Jeux de puissants (November 2004)
9. Scala (September 2006)
10. Mensonges (May 2007)
11. Fucking patriot (September 2009)
12. Petit tour avec Malcolm (August 2013)
13. Le syndrome de Maracamba (September 2015)
14. Dominos (September 2019)
15. Roadies (September 2020)
16. Sherpa (November 2021)
17. Liberty Ship (September 2022)
18. Drones (October 2023)

== Translations ==
All albums of the series were translated in Dutch (Alfa) and German (Agent Alpha). The first six albums were also translated in Polish.

Since July 2008, Cinebook Ltd has been publishing Alpha. Four English albums have been released so far:

1. The Exchange (includes 'The Bogdanov Clan'; July 2008)
2. Wolves' Wages (April 2009)
3. The List (July 2010)
4. Sanctions (January 2014)
