= Orbital (comics) =

Comic book series by Sylvain Runberg and Serge Pellé

- The first book in the series, Scars, featuring the two main characters Caleb and Mezoke

Publication information
- Publisher: Dupuis (French); Cinebook (English)
- Format: Ongoing series
- Genre: Graphic novel for young adults
- No. of issues: 8 (in French); 8 (in English)

Creative team
- Written by: Sylvain Runberg
- Artist: Serge Pellé

Orbital is a Franco-Belgian science fiction comic book series written by Sylvain Runberg, illustrated by Serge Pellé and published by Dupuis in French, Cinebook in English, Cobolt förlag in Swedish, Splitter in German and ReNoir Comics in Italy.

== Story ==
The story follows a pair of Interworld Diplomatic Office (IDO) agents on their intergalactic diplomatic peace missions. The agents are Mezoke Izzua, a Sandjarrian, and Caleb Swany, a Human. The missions reveal a rich universe of various interwoven plots by various political and interest factions involving numerous cultures and races across the galaxy.

== Volumes ==
1. Cicatrices - April 2006 ISBN 978-2-8001-3796-4
2. Ruptures - June 2007 ISBN 978-2-8001-3927-2
3. Nomades - August 2009 ISBN 978-2-8001-4075-9
4. Ravages - October 2010 ISBN 978-2-8001-4711-6
5. Justice - September 2012 ISBN 978-2-8001-4917-2
6. Résistance - March 2015 ISBN 978-2-8001-5655-2
7. Implosion - January 2017 ISBN 978-2-8001-6611-7
8. Contacts - September 2019 ISBN 978-2-8001-7155-5

== Translations ==
Since May 2009, Cinebook has been publishing Orbital. The following volumes have been released:

1. Scars - May 2009 ISBN 978-1-905460-89-2
2. Ruptures - July 2009 ISBN 978-1-905460-95-3
3. Nomads - May 2011 ISBN 978-1-84918-080-1
4. Ravages - July 2011 ISBN 978-1-84918-088-7
5. Justice - February 2014 ISBN 978-1-84918-172-3
6. Resistance - August 2015 ISBN 978-1-84918-262-1
7. Implosion - November 2017 ISBN 978-1-84918-378-9
8. Contacts - April 2020 ISBN 978-1-84918-497-7
