= Insiders (Dargaud) =

French-Belgian comic book series

- The first book in the series, Chechen Guerrilla.

Publication information
- Publisher: Dargaud (French); Cinebook (English)
- Format: Ongoing series
- Genre: Graphic novel for Adults
- No. of issues: 8 (in French); 3 (in English)

Creative team
- Written by: Jean-Claude Bartoll
- Artist: Renaud Garreta

Insiders is a Franco-Belgian comic book series written by Jean-Claude Bartoll, illustrated by Renaud Garreta and published by Dargaud in French and Cinebook in English.

== Volumes ==
1. Guérilla tchétchène - 09/2002 ISBN 2-205-05372-8
2. Opération Offshore - 06/2003 ISBN 2-205-05393-0
3. Missiles pour Islamabad - 09/2004 ISBN 2-205-05556-9
4. Le piège afghan - 06/2005 ISBN 2-205-05658-1
5. O.P.A. sur le Kremlin - 12/2006 ISBN 2-205-05761-8
6. Destination goulag - 12/2007 ISBN 978-2-205-05962-5
7. Les dragons de Pékin - 03/2009 ISBN 978-2-205-06233-5
8. Le prince rouge - 11/2009 ISBN 978-2-205-06281-6

== Translations ==
Since July 2009, Cinebook Ltd has been publishing Insiders. Three albums have been released so far:

1. Chechen Guerrilla (includes 'Operation Offshore') - July 2009 ISBN 978-1-905460-96-0
2. Missiles for Islamabad - May 2010 ISBN 978-1-84918-033-7
3. The Afghan Trap - October 2010 ISBN 978-1-84918-053-5
