= The Chimpanzee Complex =

French Comics Series

- The first book in the series, Paradox featuring the main character.

Publication information
- Publisher: Dargaud (French); Cinebook (English)
- Genre: Science fiction
- No. of issues: 3 (in French); 3 (in English)

Creative team
- Written by: Richard Marazano
- Artist(s): Jean-Michel Ponzio

The Chimpanzee Complex is a French comics series written by Richard Marazano and illustrated by Jean-Michel Ponzio. It was published by Dargaud in 2007–2011.

== Plot summary ==
=== Paradox ===
In 2035, the Apollo 11 reentry capsule splashes down in the Indian Ocean and is retrieved by the US Navy. The capsule is carrying Neil Armstrong and Buzz Aldrin, both claiming to have no knowledge of how they arrived in the future or why history records their successful return to Earth in 1969. The astronaut Helen Freedman, who has been tapped for a crewed mission to Mars, is tasked with verifying the identity of the astronauts. Before NASA and the US military can question the men further, Armstrong and Aldrin die from rapid aging.

Helen accompanies a team of astronauts consisting of Mission Commander Konrad, Aleksa, Alex, and Kurt to the Moon on a mission sponsored by the Department of Defense to investigate the "true" fate of the Apollo 11 mission. On the Moon, Helen, Konrad and Aleksa discover the remains of Armstrong and Aldrin, who inexplicably did not return to Earth, adding to the mystery. Meanwhile, Kurt and Alex encounter another reentry capsule containing the remains of Michael Collins. The astronauts also intercept mysterious radio signals from a lost Soviet crewed mission to Mars. In a subplot, Helen's ten-year-old daughter Sofia Freedman resents her mother's absences and thinks that she is neglecting her.

=== The Sons of Ares ===
Continuing their mission to Mars, the American astronauts enter into cryogenic sleep. The shuttle is crewed by fellow astronauts Paul and Mark. The latter perishes during a solar storm while the former is driven insane. The astronauts are briefed by the Department of Defense about a lost Soviet mission to Mars led by cosmonaut Yuri Gagarin, whose death in this story was staged in order to maintained the secrecy of the Martian mission. Landing on Mars, the Americans locate the Soviet base and encounter two surviving members of the Soviet mission named Vladimir and Borislav, who claim that Gagarin went insane and has retreated inside a glacial cave.

Helen encounters the insane Gagarin, who talks about Werner Heisenberg's Uncertainty principle and claims that the lost cosmonauts and astronauts have merged into the universe's consciousness. The American astronauts later discover the remains of Gagarin, leading them to believe that the other cosmonauts killed him. They attempt to subdue and sedate the cosmonauts who fight back and are killed in a gas explosion that consumes the Martian module. The other astronauts do not believe Helen's account that she encountered Gagarin. After months traveling back to Earth, the American astronauts discover that the Earth has seemingly disappeared. Meanwhile, NASA loses contact with the astronauts' shuttle.

In the Sofia subplot, Helen leaves Sofia in the care of her NASA colleague Robert Conway. A resentful Sofia runs away from home before being returned to Robert's care by the authorities. Following Helen and her team's disappearance, Sofia runs away again to the dismay of Robert.

=== Civilisation ===
Helen and Aleksa awake after 70 years of cryogenic sleep to discover that fellow astronauts Konrad and Kurt have perished while Alex has disappeared. They find that their shuttle has docked with an abandoned gigantic alien ship. While exploring the alien ship, Helen watches recordings sent by Roger. Reflecting on the Uncertainty principle, Helen comes to believe that the various space missions have disrupted the spacetime continuum. The pair are also attacked by an elderly and deranged Alex, who has spent the past decades cobbling together an escape craft to return to Earth. Determined to return to Earth, Alex attacks Helen and Aleksa but is shot dead by Aleksa. Aleksa's bullet releases poisonous gas. Aleksa sacrifices himself so that Helen can return to Earth and reunite with her daughter.

Due to time dilation, Helen returns to Earth in 2097 where she splashes down in the Arctic Circle. After being picked up by Russian forces, she is questioned by an American official, who informs her that "Helen" had supposedly returned from her mission and died on Earth 30 years ago. Taking pity on Helen, the NASA official arranges for Helen to be given a new identity. While starting a new life in Seminole, Florida Helen learns that her daughter Sofia became the first female astronaut to leave the Solar System, having been inspired by her astronaut mother. While gazing at the stars, Helen hopes to reassure her daughter that she never really left her.

== Awards ==
- Best Album Award in 2007 Lyon's comic's convention.
- Best album and best story in 2008 Le Bourget Museum comic's convention.

== Bibliography ==
1. Paradoxe (April 2007)
2. Les fils d'Arès (January 2008)
3. Civilisation (November 2008)

Cinebook Ltd translated into English the series, in the following volumes:

1. Paradox (September 2009)
2. The Sons of Ares (January 2010)
3. Civilisation (July 2010)
