= XIII: The Series =

- Season 1 poster
- Genre: Action; Conspiracy; Thriller; Drama; Mystery
- Based on: XIII by Jean Van Hamme and William Vance
- Developed by: Duane Clark
- Starring: Stuart Townsend; Roxane Mesquida; Aisha Tyler; Virginie Ledoyen; Caterina Murino; Greg Bryk; Stephen McHattie; Ted Atherton
- Composer: Nicolas Errèra
- Countries of origin: France; Canada
- Original language: English
- No. of seasons: 2
- No. of episodes: 26 (list of episodes)

Production
- Executive producer: Jay Firestone
- Production locations: Toronto, and Georgetown Canada; Paris, France
- Running time: 44 minutes
- Production companies: Prodigy Pictures; Cipango; Canal+; M6; Shaw Media; EuropaCorp

Original release
- Network: Canal+ (France); Mystery TV (Canada); Showcase (Canada); Ztélé (in French) (Canada); ReelzChannel (USA)
- Release: 18 April 2011 – 19 November 2012

Related
- XIII: The Conspiracy

XIII: The Series is an English-language Franco-Canadian television series that premiered in April 2011 in France and Canada. The series is based on the Belgian comic albums series of the same name created by Jean Van Hamme and William Vance. It's about an amnesiac protagonist who seeks to discover his concealed past. The TV series follows the events of the 2008 television film XIII: The Conspiracy. The first season follows the plot in parallel with the existing volumes in the comic series, while the second season diverts into an all-new original story arc.

== Production ==
Shaw Media (then still known as Canwest) announced on 9 July 2010 the new dramas Blackstone, Endgame, King, and XIII would be produced for the 2010–11 season, and that Combat Hospital would be produced for the 2011–12 season in addition to the already announced series Shattered and Lost Girl. Along with four comedies and three pilot movies, it made for the largest order for scripted original programming that Canwest had ever done. Production on XIII began on 13 September 2010 with filming in and around Toronto, including Barber Mill, Georgetown, Ontario. Portions of XIII were also filmed in Paris.

== Characters ==
- Stephen Dorff (XIII: The Conspiracy) and Stuart Townsend (season 1–2) as Ryan Flay/"XIII": A covert CIA operative and former secret agent who doesn't remember who he is, or his own name, but retains his sophisticated combat and infiltration skills from his government training. His exploration of his past is the focus of the series – XIII was sent on secret missions so dark that no one in Washington knew their actual purpose: the most recent was the Sally Sheridan assassination, where an elaborate cover-up changed his face. While ultimately successful, XIII's memory was erased, and he was betrayed by the government and locked away deep inside an Eastern European prison. At the start of the series he escaped, and now he's searching for answers, uncovering his shadowy past and the international conspiracies that threaten his present. Powerful figures threaten and manipulate him as he gets closer to the mysterious center of a deadly puzzle – where the key to all the intrigue is XIII. Other names he has been referred to include "Seamus O'Neill", "El Cascador", "Jason Peter Mullway" and "Victor Gong". As of the Season 2 finale, he is in hiding with Betty, his lover who is pregnant with his child, and Barnabis, a loyal ally, in South America.
- Greg Bryk as DNI Samuel Amos (season 1–2): The Director of National Intelligence under President Ben Carrington and former US Army Colonel – a title the President still uses with him, Amos believes that his job is to protect the United States government at any cost, even if that means taking the law into his own hands. A highly intelligent ex-military man, he spent his time in the service behind the lines, planning strategies and developing innovative tactics – skills that he carried with him into his current office. While he requires rules and order, he doesn't hesitate to get his hands dirty when necessary. He has deep mistrust and suspicion of XIII and his mysterious past, and has repeatedly attempted to have him removed or killed for national security – Amos sees him as dangerous and uncontrollable, and his links to black operations are too dangerous to remain free. In Season 2, Amos has been removed from his position after killing Sheridan, and is now CEO of Synequanon. After Victor bombs Synequanon headquarters, killing Amos's wife and daughter, Amos thirsts for vengeance against XIII; believing, incorrectly, he is responsible. Later after a massive manhunt, he learns the truth, and teams up with him to defeat Victor and destroy HEARPE. Amos also forms a relationship with President-elect Harriet Traymore and works with her to oust Carrington from power in exchange for his restoration as DNI. He is now leading the government on a manhunt for XIII – the only thing that now matters to him.
- Stephen McHattie as President Ben Carrington (season 1–2): A former US Army four-star General and President of the United States, Carrington understands that, in protecting the government, operating within the grey areas gets results – hence he respects Jones, who will bend the rules for the betterment of the whole, and XIII most of all. While Carrington is willing to stretch the limits of his position, he disdains dirty politics and backroom deal making. He is honest and forthright, while at the same time, thick-skinned and relentlessly tough. A good man to have as a friend, and a terrible man to have as an enemy. Carrington, during the events of the Roman Numeral Conspiracy, was Deputy Director of the NSA and worked with XIII to expose the conspiracy, during which his daughter, Kim Rowland, is killed. At the start of the series, Carrington had left the military and went into politics as a democrat, becoming vice president to republican president Wally Sheridan. After using evidence of the conspiracy to blackmail Sheridan into resigning, Carrington becomes president to finish out Sheridan's term. When XIII resurfaces, he forms a workable arrangement with Carrington to track down the Renelco weapon and retrieve it; all in the hopes of uncovering his true identity. Carrington makes it clear that he both trusts and respects XIII after his efforts to expose the Roman Numeral Conspiracy, and grants him all the access and resources he can to aid in his quest. Carrington had faced a difficult re-election against Wally Sheridan; who has steadily discredited Carrington in the eyes of the public, but he does gain a sense of peace with Kim's death when he takes her newly found son; Roger, under his protection (though when it is found Roger is Kim's illegitimate son with Sheridan himself, it further escalates the animosity between them). In the Season 1 finale, Carrington orders Jones to turn on XIII and shoot him with a sniper rifle, with XIII briefly remembering Carrington was behind the Renelco mission and had used him all along. In Season 2, Carrington was campaigning for a full four-year term in his own right in the 2016 presidential election, but lost the general election in a landslide to former Alaska Republican Governor Harriet Traymore. Desperate to remain in power long enough to destroy HEARPE, Carrington declares martial law in order to hold onto the presidency, even as his supporters dwindle and his sanity crumbles. In the Season 2 finale, Carrington makes his last stand and his arrested by Traymore's military, who force him to finally surrender the office on 20 January 2017. Carrington has been imprisoned in Guantanamo, declared dead to the public, but labeled as a hero for his efforts to destroy HEARPE. He is now facing endless hours of torture by Amos for XIII's whereabouts.
- Aisha Tyler as Agent/Secretary Lauren Jones (season 1–2): A resourceful and determined government agent and former US Army Major, Jones was an Ivy League graduate, former military sniper who served under General Carrington and a top Secret Service agent. Her relationship with XIII is complicated; she was XIII's friend and partner, as well as his former lover, but that ended when XIII lost his memory, but afterwards remained the only one he thought he could trust. Jones, during the events of the Roman Numeral Conspiracy, was a CIA operative who worked with XIII to expose the conspiracy. At the start of the series, Jones had been told XIII was stationed overseas on a black operation. When XIII resurfaces, having really been secretly imprisoned by her boss DNI Amos, Jones is transferred to Homeland Security and assigned by Amos to assist XIII in his investigation of the Renelco weapon and Rainer Gerhardt, as well as XIII's own efforts of uncovering his true identity – her shared history with XIII makes her the perfect person to help him and track him for Amos. In the Season 1 finale, Jones, on the orders of President Carrington, she shot XIII in an assassination attempt. In Season 2, for her loyalty, Jones was promoted to U.S. Secretary of State. Secretly, Jones never forgave herself for shattering XIII's trust in her. After XIII appeared again, miraculously alive and believed responsible for the Synequanon bombing, Jones makes a fateful decision – during a confrontation with XIII, she is fatally shot by XIII.2 – XIII's double who was truly responsible for the bombing – and died in the real XIII's arms. In the Season 2 finale, Jones was revealed to have been XIII's trainer with the New World Order, establishing their history went back further than believed.
- Roxane Mesquida as Betty Barnowsky (season 2): A beautiful young French environmental activist, Betty is a political idealist, and one of the main members of the anti-globalization group The Veil. A free spirit, Betty is a lover, not a fighter. However, what her activist friends don't know is that she has a secret that goes against everything they believe in – her father, Leon, is a leading member of the New World Order, and Betty herself is in hiding from them. When Betty meets XIII, she convinces him to join The Veil, starting a chain of events that are explored in Season 2 – Betty seduces XIII and becomes his lover, as well as XIII.2's. She becomes pregnant from their sexual relationship; although she doesn't know which of them is the father. Despite her fugitive status, following the disbanding of The Veil and battles against Xu Corporation and the New World Order itself, Betty is determined to protect her child from the forces pursuing them. As of the Season 2 finale, she is in hiding with XIII and Barnabis in South America.
- Stuart Townsend as Victor Gong/"XIII.2" (season 2): An exact physical double of XIII, Victor is an operative of Xu Corporation working to develop the weather controlling HEARPE Project, to the point he performs terrorist bombings and assassinations in the United States to undermine their government's attempts to oppose Xu. Seemingly a psychotic and homicidal doppelgänger of the real XIII, Victor is shown to have deeper reasoning behind his actions – he is secretly using Xu in his effort to battle the New World Order that apparently created him, XIII and countless previous clones who served them and their purposes. While still taking orders from Leon Barnowsky, he has secretly broken free to bring down their empire. Another objective from his actions was to get XIII to remember their agreement to work together against the Order. In the Season 2 finale, a virtual reality battle to the death between XIII and Victor results in his virtual death, and HEARPE is destroyed. But his real fate is never determined, and his status remains unknown.
- Virginie Ledoyen as Irina Svetlanova (season 1): A strong, sexy and ruthless Russian mercenary, Irina works as Wally Sheridan's operative, hunting for the Renelco weapon, and so regularly clashes with XIII. Irina feels no emotion about the line of work she has chosen. Lethal with a knife, gun or hand-to-hand combat, she kills whenever the price is right. In the Season 1 finale, Irina is shot and killed by XIII.
- Ted Atherton as President Walter "Wally" Sheridan (season 1): The former President of the United States, Sheridan is the second member of his family to hold that office – following his sister, Sally, who was assassinated – an effort Sheridan masterminded to gain the office for himself. At the start of the series, Sheridan had been blackmailed into resigning by Carrington, but even out of office, Sheridan is pulling strings and making deals he believes will result in making the United States a stronger nation. Sheridan is ambitious, well-connected, and has his own reasons for following XIII. During the Roman Numeral Conspiracy, Sheridan was the Republican Governor of North Carolina, and was present at the assassination of his sister, President Sally Sheridan, in 2010. Sheridan campaigned for the presidency in 2012, claiming to take up his sister's legacy, and ultimately won the election and supervised the effort to capture or eliminate the remaining members. Sheridan was sworn in as the nation's 46th President on 20 January 2013. In truth, XIII and his government allies realized too late that Sheridan himself was the mastermind behind the conspiracy. Two years following the events of the mini-series, Sheridan is revealed to have actually left the presidency, having been blackmailed into resigning during the spring of 2015 by his Democratic Vice President, Ben Carrington, after threatening him with evidence that Sheridan had his sister killed so he could take office. Despite retirement, which Sheridan cited as due to a diagnosis with a chronic heart problem, Sheridan remains largely popular with the public, and, after joining forces with Rainer Gerhardt to locate and retrieve the Renelco information weapon in exchange for the funding and support he needs to regain power, and having already been steadily discrediting Carrington, eventually comes forward and announces his bid for re-election for the 2016 presidential elections against Carrington. Sheridan, like his operative, Irina Svetlanova, attempts to gain XIII's trust, having arranged the effort to get him out of the Eastern European black site, as well as aid him in his efforts of uncovering his true identity. Ultimately, however, Sheridan is established as an enemy of XIII and dedicated to eliminating him as, in his eyes, XIII is endangering his effort to regain power. Sheridan was delighted to learn he had a son with Carrington's daughter, Kim, before her death in the mini-series, and this knowledge increases his desire to regain the presidency. In the Season 1 finale, Samuel Amos confronts Sheridan in his home and attempts to bluff him into shooting himself in an effort to derail his plans to get back in power. Sheridan calmly refuses and they shoot each other. In Season 2, it is revealed Sheridan was killed by Amos, for which he has been removed from his position. With his death, former Alaska Governor Harriet Traymore became the Republican nominee for president by default – she later won the general election in November 2016 by a massive landslide over the Democratic incumbent, Carrington. Sheridan was buried at his presidential library in Charlotte, North Carolina.
- Paulino Nunes as DCI Frank Giordino (season 1): The Director of the CIA under President Ben Carrington and immediate subordinate of Samuel Amos, Giordino heads up the investigation into XIII and the mysterious missions of his past. If he has to, he'll make deals and cross lines to track Jones and XIII, following their clues towards a mysterious power threatening the very fabric of the American government – the Renelco weapon. The head of the CIA is later revealed as Sheridan's mole in the CIA, having originally been appointed by him and maintains his loyalty in exchange for opportunities for power alongside Sheridan. Giordino was exposed and goes rogue, with Amos taking over the CIA directly in his place. After he attempted to kidnap Sheridan's illegitimate son with Kim Rowland, Roger, for leverage, XIII threw Giordino from a moving train to his death (but his body was not found).
- Ingrid Kavelaars as President Harriet Traymore (season 2): The former Governor of Alaska and current president of the United States, Traymore was the Republican nominee (following the death of former President Wally Sheridan in Season 1, who was campaigning to reclaim the Oval Office himself at the time) for president in the 2016 elections. She is ambitious, ruthless, sexually manipulative, and a perfect match for Amos (with whom she is having an affair). Carrington is dismayed when Traymore wins the general election in a landslide, but refuses to cede power to the president-elect, not believing she recognizes the danger of HEARPE. Traymore battles Carrington for the office until the end of Season 2, when her forces storm Carrington's bunker beneath the White House and imprison him. Harriet Traymore is sworn in as the nation's second female president on 20 January 2017.
- Kristi Angus as Mischa Martin (season 2-): A journalist reporting on the events of the series.
- Demore Barnes as Chief of Staff Martin Reynolds (season 2): Chief of Staff to President Carrington, Reynolds is a loyal aide to his president, while completely aware of his crumbling sanity. His devotion to his leader comes from being a true patriot and a soldier. He is Carrington's "Praetorian Guard" in his effort to maintain power long enough against President-elect Traymore to destroy HEARPE.
- Wole Daramola as Mozambique (season 2): A loyal member of The Veil, Mozambique hides a brilliant mind behind a mountain of muscle. It's hard to say what he's devoted to more – the movement, or Betty. He remains Betty and XIII's loyal companion during their time as fugitives following the Synequanon bombing. He is willingly killed by XIII during single combat after the group is imprisoned by Xu Corporation, to give the others a chance at freedom.
- Caterina Murino as Samantha "Sam" Taylor (season 1): The owner of a New York photo shop, Sam is loyal and passionate, as well as clever and strong-willed. During the Roman Numeral Conspiracy, Sam herself on the line for XIII, and almost ended up in prison. When XIII disappeared, she thought he was dead, until one day a stranger walked into her shop – it was XIII, coming back into her life and once again, turning it upside down. Having already helped XIII in his efforts to expose the conspiracy two years ago, she also agrees to aid his efforts of uncovering his true identity. After a short time, Sam and XIII succumbed to their feelings and became lovers. She is shot and killed by Irina, during an arranged robbery, but the truth was ultimately found out and XIII killed Irina in revenge.
- Bruce Ramsay as Max Vargas (season 2): Founder and leader of The Veil, Vargas was a Chilean revolutionary deeply committed to protecting the world from globalization. He is imprisoned by the U.S. government after the Synequanon bombing with XIII.2's assistance, however XIII and his allies later rescue him. Vargas is revealed as an operative of the New World Order and leaves the group to expose the others to them, only to be captured and sent into the White House by XIII.2 in a suicide bombing that kills him.
- Tom Berenger as Rainer Gerhardt (season 1): A mysterious billionaire who has grand designs to reshuffle the balance of world power. Educated, sophisticated and worldly, Gerhardt is a high-powered industrialist, which puts him in a prime position to affect international events. He works with Wally Sheridan to secure the Renelco weapon for his plans, in exchange for supporting Sheridan's efforts to regain power. He is killed in the Season 1 finale when XIII, to retake the Renelco weapon from him, shoots him dead.
- Jack Yang as Winslow Wong (season 2): An operative of Xu Corporation and rival of Victor. He is killed in the Season 2 finale in an explosion set off by Victor, after he was prepared to take control of HEARPE away from him.
- Lisa Berry as Grier (season 2-): An operative of the New World Order, working directly for Leon Barnowsky.
- Aaron Ashmore as Dillon Masters (season 1): A computer genius with an IQ off the charts, Dillon was thrown out of MIT for hacking the physics department's computers and revising most of the accepted theorems they were working from – while they threw him out of school, they also kept using his revisions. Three years ago, Jones busted Dillon and made a deal with him – he stays out of the CIA computer system, and she doesn't toss him in jail. A bond of sorts was formed and these days Jones still reaches out to Dillon when she needs high tech, off-the- books. Dillon is brilliant, but with his brilliance, comes a quirkiness and a healthy streak of larceny, which means that Jones and XIII never know exactly how far they can trust him. In the Season 1 finale, he is badly injured by Irina. His fate is left unknown.
- Ho Chow as Terrance Pong (season 2): The CEO of the Chinese conglomerate Xu Corporation, he is both the Chinese equivalent and nemesis of Samuel Amos, who secretly employs Victor to lead the development of HEARPE. He is later arrested and imprisoned after Betty murders Ai Ning, and frames Pong for the crime, allowing her to usurp Pong's position.
- Rob Ramsay as Barnabis (season 2-): A computer genius and comic book geek, Barnabis is recruited by XIII and his allies in their efforts to destroy HEARPE and defeat Victor. As of the Season 2 finale, he is in hiding with XIII and Betty in South America.
- Tara Rosling as Heike (season 1): Gerhardt's loyal subordinate and intermediary with Sheridan.
- Matthew Bennett as Max Serle (season 1): A former CIA operative and US Army technical ordnance officer, Serle is the only other surviving operative from the Renelco mission, and a search for him by XIII, the government and Sheridan and Gerhardt's operatives is the focus of Season 1. He is finally located and fatally shot in a showdown in his remote bunker hideout, by a team of Sheridan's operatives led by Irina, but not before giving XIII the final piece of the puzzle behind the mission they did together.
- Peter MacNeill as Sean Mullway (season 1): A CIA operative stationed overseas as an asset with the IRA, Mullway may have been XIII's biological father. He is killed in a shootout with Gerhardt's operatives, denying XIII the chance to confirm this or learn more of his past.
- Michael Ironside as Leon Barnowsky (season 2): Betty and Frederick's father and a leading member of the New World Order. In the Season 2 finale, Leon gives orders to Victor to complete his mission for HEARPE and kill XIII, but he appears as a vision to XIII himself to reveal key parts of his past and connection to the Order.
- Sarah Lian as Ai Ning (season 2): Heiress to Xu Corporation and Victor's wife, who welcomes XIII into his home and her bed to prove his "restored" identity, although the deception is later uncovered. Ai Ning is murdered by Betty as part of her plan with Victor to take over Xu. Pong was framed by Betty and blamed for her murder.
- Ephraim Ellis as Frederick Barnowsky (season 2): Betty's brother and Leon's son, Frederick was a government scientist working as an inside source for The Veil, which his sister was involved in. He was shot and killed by Victor with a sniper rifle when he attempted to pass on information to Betty about HEARPE.
- Vanessa Matsui as Laura Amos (season 1–2): Amos's wife and a teacher. She is killed in the Synequanon bombing by Victor, for which XIII is blamed.
- Jessica Field as Abigail Amos (season 1–2): Amos's daughter. She is killed in the Synequanon bombing by Victor, for which XIII is blamed.
- Christian Martyn as Roger Hansby (season 1): Sheridan's illegitimate son with Kim Rowland, and Carrington's grandson. He has been placed in government protection.

== Episodes ==
Series	Episodes	Originally released (France)	
Series	Episodes	First released	Last released
The Conspiracy	2	6 October 2008	13 October 2008
1	13	18 April 2011	23 May 2011
2	13	15 October 2012	19 November 2012

=== The Conspiracy (2008) ===
The two-part mini-series served as a backdoor pilot for the series and stars Val Kilmer, Stephen Dorff as "XIII" as well as series regulars Stephen McHattie, Greg Bryk, Ted Atherton and Caterina Murino. It premiered in France on Canal+ on 6 and 13 October 2008, was first broadcast in Canada on Global and in the USA on NBC on 8 and 15 February 2009, in Australia on Nine on 1 and 8 November 2009, and in the United Kingdom on 27 December 2009 on Five. Showcase rebroadcast the show in Canada in 2010 and ReelzChannel rebroadcast it in the US in 2012 before they started showing Season 1.

Title	Directed by	Written by	France air date	Canadian air date
"Part 1: The Day of the Black Sun" "Le Jour du Soleil Noir"	Duane Clark	David Wolkove & Philippe Lyon	6 October 2008	8 February 2009
Female US President Sheridan is killed from a mile away by a masterly sniper who leaves no trace. The vice president, now having succeeded for a short end of term, is contested by the president's brother, Governor Wally Sheridan, who plays the national insecurity card, as the murder is only the first in a series of terrorist strikes. Colonel Amos and his team are given free rein to track down and catch the killer at all cost. Meanwhile, a retired couple find a wounded young man (Stephen Dorff) hanging from a tree by his parachute and decided to nurse him back to health. He cannot remember his past and the only clue to his identity is a numerical tattoo on his chest, "XIII," but comes to realize through serious amnesia that he's probably the sniper. Two teams track him down. La Mangouste's commando team kills the couple, tortures him and anyone known to have crossed his path but loses him again. General Carrington tells him his identity is an elaborate fake to support the conspiracy, which uses the collateral victims as decoys at every terrorist strike, all tattooed with Roman numerals, like his XIII.
"Part 2: All the Tears of Hell" "Toutes les Larmes de L'Enfer"	Duane Clark	David Wolkove & Philippe Lyon	13 October 2008	15 February 2009
XIII (Stephen Dorff) successfully deals with his multiple identity mystery and the terrorist threats as well as a top-level conspiracy including the White House chief of staff, which La Mangouste fails to protect against him. Wally Sheridan is elected president, instead of Vice President Galbraith, who thanks him and General Carrington. Yet 'XIII' senses something isn't right.

=== Season 1 (2011) ===
The first season of XIII consists of 13 episodes with Gil Grant as showrunner. It premiered in France on 18 April 2011 on Canal+, where two episodes were shown on Monday nights. The North American debut for the series was 19 April 2011 in Canada on Mystery TV, where the series was shown at 10:00 am ET on Tuesday mornings. The series was shown in prime-time in Canada on Showcase, where episodes were shown Wednesday nights at 10:00 pm ET and were also available in HDTV. The twelfth and thirteenth episodes were shown Tuesdays at 10:00 pm ET on Showcase due to the return of Weeds' seventh season. In the United States it was shown on prime-time on Friday nights more than a year later on the ReelzChannel starting 29 June 2012.

No. overall	No. in season	Title	Directed by	Written by	France air date	Canadian air date
1	1	"Pilot" "Pilote"	John Stead & Duane Clark	Gil Grant	18 April 2011	19 April 2011
After the events of the mini-series, NSA Director Amos creates elaborate cover-up for the Sally Sheridan assassination by changing XIII's face (now played by Stuart Townsend) and placing him in a brutal rendition camp. Two years later, XIII is sprung from the rendition camp in a daring escape by mysterious allies. These allies turn out to be former President Sheridan and psychotic freelance killer Irina Svetlanova. When Sheridan promises that if XIII retrieves the contents of a safe deposit box only he can access, Sheridan will give him information about his past life. XIII takes the deal. Opening the box, XIII finds a mysterious watch that contains a computer chip. Suddenly, killers from all camps converge on XIII to acquire the watch and it's all he can do to keep himself and Sam—his friend from the photo shop—alive. In the end, XIII takes the ultimate risk and makes an incursion into the White House itself in an attempt to force President Carrington to play by XIII's rules.
2	2	"Green Falls" "Green Falls"	Philippe Haïm	Philippe Lyon	18 April 2011	26 April 2011
XIII and Sam follow a clue from Sheridan to Green Falls, a small town where XIII may have grown up. As XIII begins to ask questions about himself and his father, who is a local reporter, XIII stirs up old secrets and modern-day violence. In the end, XIII learns his boyhood name, but also is driven to solve the murder of the father he never knew and a corporate scheme to hide the deaths of hundreds of workers. XIII also learns that he was conscripted into a CIA training program when he was away at college. The more answers he gets, the more mysterious his past seems to be.
3	3	"Lockdown" "Sans issue"	Duane Clark	Charles Heit	25 April 2011	3 May 2011
Chasing another lead from Sheridan, XIII gets himself thrown into a brutal Venezuelan prison in search of a prisoner who might have worked with XIII when he was a CIA operative. The problem is getting to this prisoner – Sanchez – a powerful personality who inspired the prisoners to fight for their rights. He's been declared insane and locked away in a high security area. XIII must fight off attacks from both prisoners and guards as he attempts to sneak into the secure medical ward and get the information he needs. When corrupt CIA chief, Giordino gets involved and forces XIII to do a dangerous side mission for him in the prison, it seems that even if XIII gets the information he needs, he might wind up spending the rest of his life behind the bars of this brutal institution.
4	4	"The Irish Version" "La Version irlandaise"	Xavier Palud	Denis McGrath	25 April 2011	10 May 2011
XIII follows the piece of information he learned from Sanchez in the Venezuelan prison. It leads him to Ireland in search of Seamus O'Neal, an ex-IRA operative who was inducted into the CIA at the same time XIII was. In Seamus' home town, XIII begins to ask questions about Seamus and opens up old hostilities... and a possible connection between Seamus and a new breed of IRA killers. XIII must fight to find out what Seamus was involved in… and the secrets of what it has to do with XIII's own life.
5	5	"Training Camp" "Bienvenue à Bitterroot"	Duane Clark	Pamela Davis	2 May 2011	17 May 2011
XIII follows the trail of his identity to a paramilitary training camp in the Pacific Northwest named Bitterroot where he supposedly trained. As XIII tries to discover the nature of the secret mission he was being trained for, he runs afoul of the camp's owner, Rech. It's all XIII can do to stay alive through the vicious training regime... and the ever-present danger of being discovered and executed as a spy. In the end, XIII finds some of the information he was looking for, but at a deadly cost.
6	6	"Costa Verde" "Opération Costa Verde"	Michael Robison	Peter Mohan	2 May 2011	25 May 2011
Having learned in Bitterroot that he was trained for a corporate intrusion mission in Costa Verde, XIII and Jones head off to investigate. As they dig deeper into XIII's possible involvement there, they make stunning discoveries. Not only might XIII have been involved in an explosion that killed hundreds of workers at a plant, but he was also involved with a revolutionary movement... and its beautiful and charismatic leader. In the end, what XIII finds out, might not just get him killed, it might change the course of the country's history.
7	7	"Undertow" "Plongée en eaux troubles"	Paul Shapiro	Andrea Stevens	9 May 2011	1 June 2011
XIII and Jones travel to Chicago in search of Robert Simons, one of the other agents sent to break into the plant in Costa Verde. Desperate to find out what really went on there... and in search of the information hidden in the other two watches he knows about, XIII is frustrated to learn that Simons disappeared two years ago. Even worse, XIII's search seems to have attracted the attention of others who are looking for the information from the watches, including the lethal Irina. In the end, XIII finds out what really happened to Simons and attempts to recover one of the watches. The trick will be to keep himself, Jones and Simons' daughter alive long enough to accomplish it.
8	8	"Hunting Party" "Une partie de chasse"	Alain Tasma	Grant Rosenberg	9 May 2011	8 June 2011
When Irina approaches XIII with a proposal for him to hand over one of the watches in return for the identity of the man who killed Sam, XIII makes a deal with the devil.
9	9	"The Bank Job" "Braquage à la russe"	Lee Rose	Denis McGrath	16 May 2011	15 June 2011
XIII is hot on the trail of now-exposed CIA director Giordino and tracks him to a safe deposit box in Moscow where Giordino has secreted money, documents and blackmail materials in case of an emergency. XIII and Jones plan a daring bank robbery to get to Giordino's stash before he does, but on breaking in, find more mysteries than answers. What XIII finds out is that keeping the team he put together in one piece might be harder than he ever thought. In the end, XIII may have to let the deadly Giordino get into the box so they can find out where his next move will take him. And that move might prove fatal to XIII and Jones.
10	10	"The Train" "L'enlèvement"	Steve DiMarco	Charles Heit	16 May 2011	22 June 2011
Following Giordino as he makes use of the mysterious information from his burn box, XIII and Jones find themselves looking for a young boy whose parents Giordino has brutally murdered. As they chase Giordino and the boy to a secret meeting on a train travelling across Canada, they learn the stunning truth about who the boy really is. They also learn the earth-shaking consequences of Giordino or the mysterious Gerhardt controlling him. Eventually, XIII will have his long-awaited confrontation with Giordino from which only one of them will walk away.
11	11	"The Bunker" "Le Bunker"	Ken Girotti	Peter Mohan	23 May 2011	30 June 2011
From information XIII and Jones learned from the boy Giordino kidnapped, they travel to Montana, the site of a de-commissioned blast chamber full of deadly traps... and potentially, the hiding place of Max Serle and the information from the final watch. Max, one of the conspirators in the Costa Verde mission and a dangerous paranoiac, has walled himself in the blast chamber, having tricked it out with deadly traps. It's up to XIII and Jones to fight their way through the installation to get to Max and convince him of who XIII really is before Irina and her team of mercenaries can get there first.
12	12	"The Key" "La Clé"	Alain Tasma	Grant Rosenberg	23 May 2011	5 July 2011
Having retrieved the final watch from Max Serle, XIII fits the pieces of the encrypted file together to find that it requires a password. As Amos and his team try to preemptively take back the information before XIII can use it, XIII and Dillon work frantically to break the password. Throughout this, XIII realizes that the mysterious Gerhardt has led him through the facets of his previous life for a reason. The password is somewhere in what he's re-experienced over the last weeks of his quest. In the end, unless he breaks the code in time, the forces that shape his destiny may cheat XIII out of the answers he so desperately needs.
13	13	"Revelation" "Révélations"	Clark Johnson	Denis McGrath	23 May 2011	12 July 2011
Gerhardt has stolen the information weapon from XIII and is bent on using it to undermine world powers to his benefit. XIII and Jones enlist Dillon to help them track Gerhardt's operations to Paris where Gerhardt has a stronghold. But in Paris, XIII must fight his way through the layers of protection that Gerhardt has set up to find Gerhardt's base of operations. Finally, XIII and Gerhardt have their confrontation as they chase through the streets of Paris. As they work through their final meeting, the fate of the information weapon, of XIII's life… and the future of society itself will hang in the balance.

=== Season 2 (2012) ===
After a period of some uncertainty, a Twitter announcement on 11 December 2011 by Stuart Townsend, the actor who plays "XIII", stated the series was renewed for a second season. It further states the show will undergo "a major retooling, taking the show in a new direction". Filming began on 13 February 2012, in Toronto, Canada. The second season consists of 13 episodes with Roger Avary as showrunner. It premiered in France on 15 October 2012 on Canal+, where two to three episodes were shown on Monday nights for a period of six weeks. It is expected to be rebroadcast on M6 in 2013.

No. overall	No. in season	Title	Directed by	Written by	France air date	Canadian air date
14	1	"Phoenix"	Alain Tasma	Roger Avary & David Martinez	15 October 2012	9 April 2013
Having been betrayed by his country, XIII trusts no one. He is believed dead and lives off the grid. Stumbling upon an anti-globalization protest, he meets the beautiful Betty Barnowsky and through her reluctantly becomes involved with The Veil, a radical activist group led by the enigmatic Max Vargas. When it seems that XIII goes mad and commits heinous crimes, his old enemies train their sights on him.
15	2	"Rampage"	Alain Tasma	Roger Avary	15 October 2012	16 April 2013
Headquarters of the multi-national Synequanon are bombed, resulting in the death of innocents. Authorities and the media hold The Veil and XIII responsible and label them as terrorists. XIII is captured and tortured by a mysterious figure, who seems to know him intimately.
16	3	"Defender"	Duane Clark	Denis McGrath & Peter Rowley	15 October 2012	23 April 2013
On the eve of the American election, XIII is hunted by powerful enemies: the Government, which now realizes he was never terminated; Synequanon, clamouring for revenge for the bombing of their headquarters; and by the mysterious figure who is after a set of equally mysterious letters. While evading these factions, XIII seeks to unravel the mystery behind the letters.
17	4	"Tempest"	Robert Lieberman	Christina Ray	22 October 2012	30 April 2013
Caught in the permanent storm surrounding Ariella Island, XIII is shipwrecked. Posing as a fisherman, he is befriended by Dr. Westlund who holds critical information about the letters. The aging scientist and his daughter Gale hide XIII from the Synequanon security forces holding them prisoner. On the mainland, Harriet Traymore wins the presidential election but Carrington refuses to leave office.
18	5	"Joust"	Bruce McDonald	Denis McGrath	22 October 2012	7 May 2013
XIII and Amos grapple physically and mentally, as they try to uncover the truth behind the bombing of Synequanon's headquarters. Fueled by grief and rage, Amos tortures XIII's body and attempts to manipulate his mind. XIII strives to prove his innocence and escape from Amos' twisted grasp.
19	6	"Gauntlet"	David Winning	David Martinez	29 October 2012	14 May 2013
XIII crashes an ultra-exclusive birthday party to find the final letter. The host of the party, and the owner of the letter, is a Russian Oligarch with a penchant for collecting expensive items such as rare weapons and beautiful women, and using the former on the latter. Part of his collection includes one of the Tesla letters, and XIII finds he isn't the only person who's come looking for it.
20	7	"Breakout"	Rachel Talalay	Karen McClellan	29 October 2012	21 May 2013
XIII, Betty and Mozambique rush to free Vargas before he's deported to Guantanamo, as they believe he must have information about the letters. Synequanon's tests of their newest technology have unforeseen, cataclysmic results.
21	8	"Mousetrap"	Rachel Talalay	Roger Avary	5 November 2012	28 May 2013
Betty and XIII both question the reality of their situations: concealing his true identity, XIII sails to China, searching the ship for the final letter which has been hidden somewhere on board; Betty is abducted and delivered to her father in London, who claims that her experiences with XIII and the Veil have been nothing but the narcotic-induced hallucinations of a runaway.
22	9	"Pong"	David Winning	Christina Ray	5 November 2012	4 June 2013
XIII is delivered into the hands of Xu Corporation, who believe him to be Victor Gong, also known as XIII.2. While XIII allows the deception to continue, he is plagued by memories that force him to question his true identity. President Carrington imposes a state of martial law, halting the transfer of power to Harriet Traymore.
23	10	"Black Widow"	Pascal Laugier	David Martinez	12 November 2012	11 June 2013
Xu Corporation gives XIII the face of agent Victor Gong (XIII.2), which only intensifies his struggles with identity. Betty plots revenge against her father by trying to sabotage his efforts in China. Carrington watches his empire crumble around him.
24	11	"Punchout"	David Wu	Karen McClellan	12 November 2012	18 June 2013
XIII is thrown into The Pit, an underground dungeon where prisoners are forced to fight to the death in matches broadcast live online. XIII tries to rally the prisoners, which include Amos, Mozambique and Grier, while staying alive long enough to attempt an escape. XIII.2 and Betty mastermind a hostile takeover of Xu Corporation.
25	12	"Berzerk"	Bruce McDonald	Gala Avary	19 November 2012	25 June 2013
XIII, Betty and Amos escape from The Pit and into Shanghai but are trapped in a mysterious and sinister riot that has spontaneously formed around them. Thirteen-year-old Yen-Boi and his father Ping help them find and fight their way through the chaos. With access to a Navy Seal helicopter, Amos leads them towards the extraction point. Carrington is pushed further into the bunker by Traymore's forces, and makes a last-ditch effort to rally support.
26	13	"Battlezone"	Duane Clark	John Smith	19 November 2012	2 July 2013
The safety of the world is at stake. The Chinese HEARPE is now fully operational. With the help of Betty and Barnabis, XIII tries to destroy HEARPE while XIII.2 attempts to unleash its destructive force – a terrifying array of natural disasters – on the United States. But only one man will triumph. Only one man will survive. Making his last stand in the bunker, Carrington contemplates extreme measures.
