= Soulmates (film) =

- Directed by: Duane Clark
- Written by: Duane Clark
- Produced by: Cindy Clark; Duane Clark
- Starring: Zachary Throne
- Cinematography: M. David Mullen
- Edited by: Cindy Clark
- Music by: David E. Russo
- Production companies: Clark Cinema; In-Finn-ity Productions
- Distributed by: Curb Entertainment
- Release date: April 25, 1997 (Riverside, California)
- Running time: 95 minutes
- Country: United States
- Language: English

Soulmates is a 1997 American drama film written and directed by Duane Clark and starring Zachary Throne.

== Cast ==
- Zachary Throne as Dean Carter
- Bill Cobbs as Mr. Williams
- Christine Cavanaugh as Anna Weisland
- Debra Wilson as Jennifer Williams
- C.J. Bau as Dean's Father
- James Brown as himself
