= XIII (2003 video game) =

2003 video game

- Developer: Ubisoft Paris (Note: Ported to Xbox by Southend Interactive and to Mac OS X by Zonic)
- Publishers: Ubisoft (Note: Published digitally by Microids); Feral Interactive (Mac OS X)
- Director: Elisabeth Pellen
- Producer: Julien Barès
- Designer: Jean Zappavigna
- Programmer: Dominique Duvivier
- Artist: Nathalie Provost
- Writer: Elisabeth Pellen
- Composers: Alkis Argyriadis; Lionel Gaget
- Engine: Unreal Engine 2
- Platforms: Windows, PlayStation 2, Xbox, GameCube, Mac OS X
- Release: Windows, PlayStation 2: NA: November 18, 2003; EU: November 28, 2003; GameCube, Xbox: NA: November 25, 2003; EU: November 28, 2003; Mac OS X: NA: June 11, 2004
- Genres: First-person shooter, stealth
- Modes: Single-player, multiplayer

XIII is a first-person shooter video game, loosely based on the first five volumes of the 1984 Belgian graphic novel series of the same name. Developed and published by Ubisoft, it was released in November 2003 for Microsoft Windows, PlayStation 2, and GameCube; an Xbox version of the game, released at the same time, was developed by Southend Interactive, while a Mac OS X version was developed by Zonic, published by Feral Interactive, and released in June 2004.

Designed with a comic book-style, cel-shaded presentation, the game incorporates single-player and multiplayer game modes. The game's main story focuses on a confused and amnesic man who searches for his identity after being found stranded on a beach. He slowly finds himself caught up in a conspiracy by a group who aims to overthrow the government. The protagonist assassinated the President of the United States, and is wanted by the FBI.

XIII received mixed reviews and sold poorly upon release, suspending plans for a sequel. However, the game has sinced gathered a cult following. It also received a follow-up game for mobile phones entitled XIII^{2}: Covert Identity, and a re-imagining of the game as a hidden object game entitled XIII: Lost Identity in October 2011. A remake of the original game for Nintendo Switch, PlayStation 4, Windows and Xbox One was released on November 10, 2020.

== Gameplay ==
XIII is a first-person shooter with elements of stealth and action in certain missions. The game centers on the main character, named XIII, who has awakened with amnesia. He uses a variety of weapons and gadgets to uncover the mystery of his identity throughout the 13 chapters and 34 missions.

XIII includes 16 weapons, from a knife to a bazooka, an Uzi to an M60. Objects such as bottles, chairs, or brooms may be used as weapons. Kevlar gear, helmets and first aid boxes are scattered throughout the map. People can be taken as hostages or as human shields, preventing enemies from firing on the protagonist. Lock picks are used to unlock doors and grapnels to climb on walls. Through the "sixth sense", XIII can hear enemies behind walls with the aid of "tap-tap-tap" signals. Stealth operations include strangling enemies or hiding dead bodies. Comic strip-style insets pop up at the top when a headshot is performed or serve as clues or tips for the player.

=== Multiplayer ===
The multiplayer hosts a maximum of 16 players. The game features three standard game modes along with modes exclusive to each system: Team Deathmatch, Deathmatch, Capture the Flag, Sabotage (on Xbox and PC), The Hunt (on PC, PS2 and GameCube), and Power-Up (on PC and PS2). Depending on the platform, players in online and offline modes (against bots) range from 4 to 16. The GameCube version does not have any online modes, while the PC version excludes the multi-screen modes but includes a map editor. There are 13 maps on Deathmatch plus one additional on Team Deathmatch, while 5 on Capture the Flag and 3 on Sabotage. The player can choose from among 10 different character appearances.

In Deathmatch, all players compete against each other and the strongest player wins. Team Deathmatch is similar, but players form two teams. In Capture the Flag, a player must retrieve the flag from their enemy's base, and bring it to their own team's base. In Sabotage, one team must place a bomb in three different locations, while the opposite team must protect these areas; the protectors win if the time limit is exceeded (except if the time is set to infinite). The bomb is always found at the beginning of the team base, and the player who holds the bomb must wait 12 seconds until they may drop it and take shelter from the ensuing detonation. In The Hunt, players must shoot ghosts, which become gradually smaller after receiving hits. The player only has one weapon, the hunting gun, with which they can shoot human opponents. Power Up is a deathmatch game, in which boxes containing special, temporary abilities, such as invisibility and higher speed, are found throughout the map.

In line with other online-enabled games on the Xbox, multiplayer on Xbox Live was available to players until 15 April 2010. XIII is now playable online again on the replacement Xbox Live servers called Insignia.

== Graphics ==
Screenshot of XIII, illustrating the insets that pops up when a headshot is performed.

The characters and weaponry in XIII are rendered with cel shading, giving a deliberately comic book style appearance, including onomatopoeic words contained in bubbles for sound effects. It uses Unreal Engine 2 because it was "really strong for level design" and allowed development "across all platforms using one engine". The graphics were compared with Jet Set Radio Future and Auto Modellista. The developer felt that the appearance reflected the comic book and innovated in its portrayal of violence; blood splatters are shown in a cartoon manner.

== Plot ==
=== Setting ===
The game's setting takes place within the same arrangement as the first five volumes of the 1984 Belgian graphic novel series XIII. While the plot itself borrows major elements from all five volumes to create singular narrative - the attempt to uncover the identities of a group of conspirators seeking to overthrow the US government, and the involvement of a man with no memory to achieve this - the adaptation of the comics features notable differences and situations in various places.

=== Synopsis ===
On a beach in Brooklyn, New York City, a man with a gunshot wound is found by a lifeguard. Suffering from amnesia, the man can only recall being shot at while trying to escape from a boat, and learns he possesses a bank deposit key and a tattoo of the Roman numeral XIII on his right shoulder. When men led by a hitman named the Mongoose arrive to kill him, identifying him as XIII, he finds himself forced to escape. Investigating the key leads XIII to a bank where he recalls he was investigating a conspiracy, but had set a trap for those involved that he inadvertently sets off. Forced to escape in the chaos, XIII finds himself arrested outside the bank by the FBI for the assassination of the President of the United States, William Sheridan. Interrogated by the lead investigator, Colonel Amos, the man learns that his face belongs to that of the shooter in the murder, Steve Rowland. After the Mongoose attacks the FBI headquarters, XIII finds himself aided by a female soldier named Jones, whom he remembers working with, and escapes from the city.

Jones informs XIII that the pair were working with war veteran General Ben Carrington, who was conducting a parallel investigation into the president's death and had unearthed a conspiracy against the US government. Learning that Carrington was arrested and taken to a base station in the Appalachian Mountains, XIII proceeds to rescue him in order to uncover his past. Carrington agrees to help him, but instructs XIII to assist a contact in the Rocky Mountains. XIII meets with the contact who identifies herself as Kim Rowland, and that he is not Rowland; the real Rowland, her husband, died after committing the assassination. Protecting her from the men sent by the Mongoose, XIII is captured following an avalanche and promptly taken away to a mental asylum for examination after the hitman suspects him to be an impostor. XIII manages to escape, killing the asylum's director, Edward Johannsen (identified as Number XX), before reuniting with Jones.

Informed of a meeting taking place in Mexico, XIII is sent to eavesdrop on it within the base of a special forces group called SPADS. During his infiltration, XIII finds out, while listening to a pair of SPADS soldiers' conversation, that he is actually Jason Fly, a squadmate of Rowland. Gathering evidence that the conspiracy involves a coup using SPADS soldiers led by a powerful group, XIII deals with two conspirators Seymour McCall (colonel of the SPADS identified as Number XI) and Franklin Edelbright (captain of the submarine USS Patriot and Number VII), while eliminating a stockpile of weapons meant for the coup. Upon returning to the United States, Carrington rendezvouses with XIII alongside Amos, and reveals to both that Sheridan's murder was conceived by Rowland, only to be betrayed and murdered by the conspirators after the assassination, but survived long enough to contact his wife. Angered by his death, Kim decided to get revenge, and decided to expose the identity of the group and their scheme to the authorities through faking Rowland's survival. Carrington reveals that Fly agreed to assist by undergoing plastic surgery to replicate Rowland's appearance; XIII recalls he had been close to identifying the leader, before something went wrong.

With the aid of the FBI, XIII proceeds to uncover the identity of the conspirators, and infiltrates a nearby hotel where two more of the conspirators, Jasper Winslow (head of the bank named after him identified as Number IX) and Clayton Willard (a US senator identified as Number V), meet to discuss their progress, but are killed on the spot. XIII's next target is the meeting site of the group to find out how the coup will occur. With sufficient evidence, XIII, Amos, and Carrington meet with William's brother Walter, and explain to him the conspiracy - a group of powerful people in the United States, calling themselves "The XX" ("The Twenty") - due to the Roman numerals tattooed onto each member - planned a coup during a war simulation exercise using loyal SPADS soldiers, who would replace US democracy with a totalitarian government. As the coup involves a key military facility, Walter offers assistance to gain entry to the site. Shortly after arriving, XIII finds himself having to protect William's successor when SPADS begin attacking the site, eliminating the remaining members that had not been killed or arrested, including William Standwell (former Chief of Staff of the United States Air Force identified as Number III) and Calvin Wax, former US Secretary of Defense and the sole possessor of Number I's identity who shoots himself (he is thought to be Number I, but is identified as Number II instead), before defeating the Mongoose in one final battle.

With the coup thwarted, Walter holds a party on his private yacht. While seeking him out, XIII overhears Kim arguing with Walter and enters the latter's private office to hear a weakened Mongoose on the speakerphone trying to contact Number I. XIII then has one final flashback in which he recalls that he was on that yacht previously when he came close to identifying Number I; realising the person he saw in the office he is currently standing in was Walter. The game ends on a cliffhanger when Walter, accompanied by armed bodyguards, finds XIII in the office, leaving whether or not Walter is, in fact, Number I ambiguous.

== Development ==
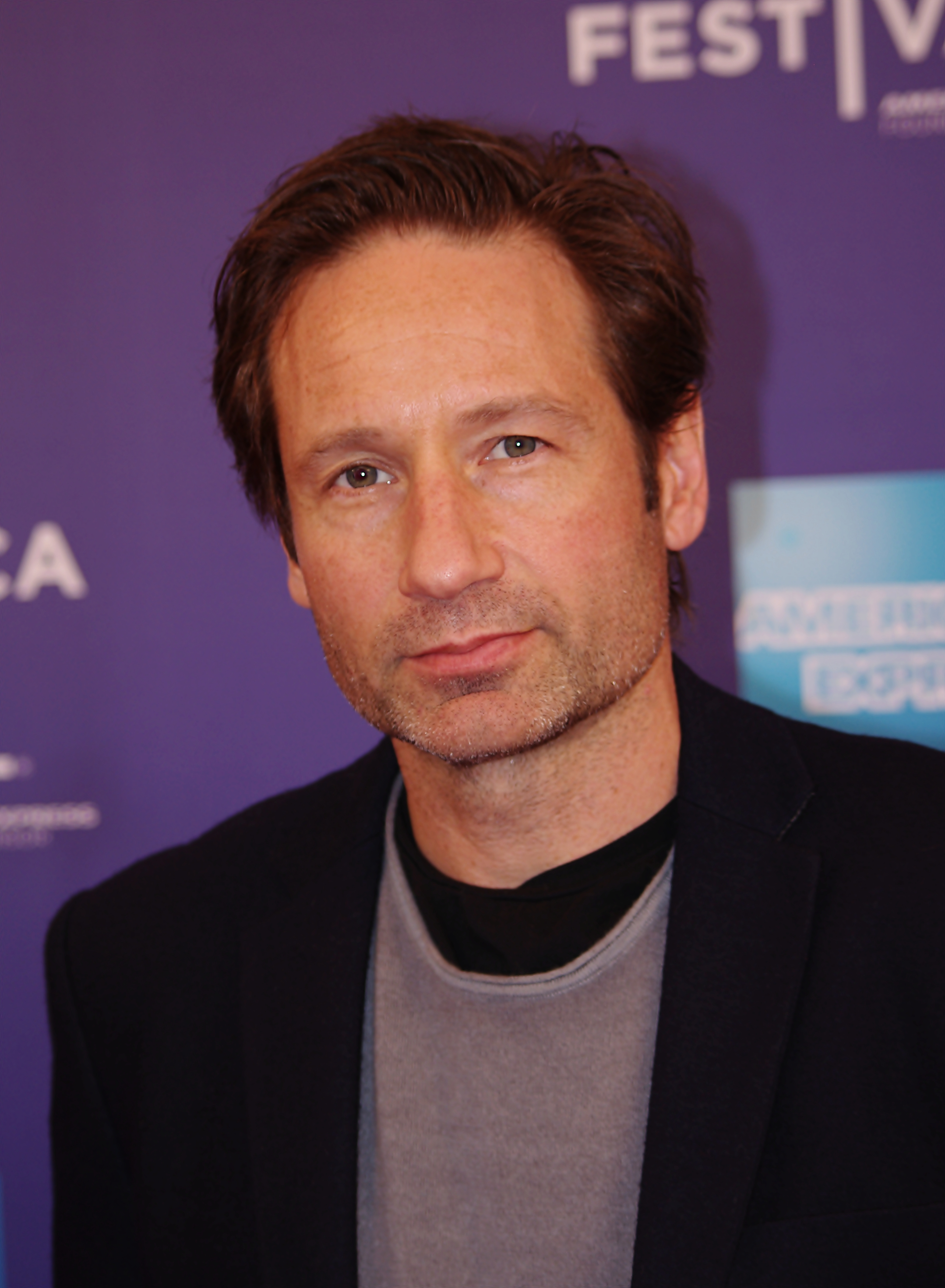
David Duchovny voiced the protagonist.

Ubisoft announced on March 13, 2002, that it would be working on a game called XIII. Based on the comic book of the same name by Belgian Jean Van Hamme. The game debuted at an event in Montreal, and was submitted at the 2002 Electronic Entertainment Expo in May 2002, with such games as Doom III, Max Payne 2 and Warcraft III: Reign of Chaos. On November 22, 2002, Ubi Soft announced a delay of the game. Justin Calvert of GameSpot guessed that the time would be used to thoroughly check the game and implement additional features on other platforms.

On May 7, 2003, Ubisoft announced that singer, actress and model Eve would be the voice for major character Jones. Ubisoft's vice president of marketing, Tony Kee, stated that she was the perfect choice for the role, praising her "combination of style, sexiness, and attitude—perfect attributes that describe the Jones character." Two months later, two other major voice acts were revealed: David Duchovny would play Jason Fly (XIII) and Adam West General Carrington. The official site was launched on August 19, featuring videos and information about the gameplay. Ubisoft implemented a pre-order on September 4, promising a free demonstration version with multiplayer and soundtrack.

The game was promoted at the Fall College Tour from September to October. Beginning at Cornell University and finishing at the University of Southern California, the tour featured demonstrations of games, playable via the 50-screen GamePort system. Another demo, multiplayer-only, was issued on October 2, but the discovery of a bug led to its removal. A different fixed demo was released a day later. Xbox players had the opportunity from December 15 on to win one of 50 copies of the game. The campaign was dubbed "13 Days to Xmas": those who spent not less than 13 hours playing until Christmas were qualified for the contest. The winner was randomly selected on January 9.

== Soundtrack ==
The Thirteen Soundtrack

Soundtrack album by various artists
- Released: 2003
- Genre: Video game soundtrack
- Length: 41:20
- Label: Future Primitive Sound

The Thirteen Soundtrack was composed by several artists from the San Francisco-based music label Future Primitive Sound. 13 tracks were produced, all of which were initially unnamed. According to the booklet, the DJs are connected with the characters, such as DJ Faust and Shortee with XIII, DJ Zeph with Carrington, or J-Boogie's Dubtronic Science with Mongoose. The album opens with an introduction and then includes songs in the likes of typical 1970s-era music such as soul, funk, jazz, while also incorporating hip hop. According to founder and creative director of the collective, Mark Herlihy, the soundtrack project began with Herlihy's friend, Pete Jacobs, whom he met at a gig, five or six years previously. After studying the characters and the story, the group decided on a noir and futuristic style that would reflect the espionage theme. Its rhythm ranges from 105 to 120 bpm.

Herlihy later stated that they "wanted to capture the essence of XIII in this soundtrack by showcasing its nostalgic style while giving the beats a modern twist" and their intention was "to tell its story through the music and create a seamless head-nodding mix that would complement the energy of XIII and get gamers hyped." One reviewer of IGN gave the album an 8 out of 10, stating: "It's an album that works expertly as a chill-out slice of background groove, yet it also doubles as a dance floor jolt of exuberance perfect for spinning at a small party". He concluded that the album is "jazzaphonic electronic tripped out funkuphoria".

The Thirteen Soundtrack track listing
| No. | Title | Featuring | Length |
|---|---|---|---|
| 1. | "Intro" | | 0:39 |
| 2. | "J-Boogie's Dubtronic Science" | J-Boogie | 3:38 |
| 3. | "Crusade" | DJ Zeph | 2:21 |
| 4. | "Needle Drop" | DJ Zeph | 3:34 |
| 5. | "The Mission" | Faust & Shortee | 4:44 |
| 6. | "Thirteen Thieves" | Romanowski | 3:04 |
| 7. | "Slingshot" | Romanowski | 3:04 |
| 8. | "The Black Hole (Remix)" | DJ Z-Trip | 2:38 |
| 9. | "The Drumbattle" | Faust & Shortee | 5:30 |
| 10. | "Covert Ops (SWAT Vs. Meat Beat Manifesto)" | Meat Beat Manifesto | 3:12 |
| 11. | "Tino's Beat (Faust & Shortee Remix)" | Tino | 4:41 |
| 12. | "Untitled" | Bing Ji Ling | 3:26 |
| 13. | "Lord of the Pants" | Romanowski | 4:14 |

== Reception ==
Reception

Aggregate score
| Aggregator | Score |
|---|---|
| Metacritic | PC: 72/100; PS2: 73/100; XBOX: 74/100; NGC: 73/100 |

Review scores
| Publication | Score |
|---|---|
| Electronic Gaming Monthly | 6.5/10 |
| Eurogamer | 8/10 |
| GameRevolution | C+ |
| GameSpy | 3/5 |
| GameZone | 7.8/10 |
| IGN | 8/10 |

=== Critical reception ===
XIII received "mixed or average" reviews from critics, according to review aggregator website Metacritic.

Reviewers often praised the game's graphical style and presentation, while criticising the gameplay. GamePro called it a "rejuvenating, jaw-dropping experience". IGN said "XIII has a great story-driven sheen, but at its core, it's weighed down by some occasional bewildering flaws, in addition to the lackluster weapons and simple combat". GameZone also criticised the combat, stating "If not for the graphics to carry the game through, XIII would have been a boring game. Gunfights are the best part of the gameplay. It also happens to be the most unbalanced part". Edge said XIII had "true artistic merit: it never gets stale; every episode has been drawn with minute care and attention. It would have been an incredible achievement if the gameplay had matched the outstanding art direction". GameSpy criticised the graphics and the multiplayer mode, and concluded "When it comes right down to it, XIII is a fine game...Just don't expect the FPS of the year because, sadly, this isn't it".

GamesTM said "It's one of those mixed-bag situations – flashes of genius and genuinely enjoyable moments of success, occasionally mired by unbalanced weapon damage, clumsy AI and the odd bit of unfair level design that requires astounding feats of memory". Eurogamer called XIII "a flawed masterpiece. A game brimming with variety and a freshness lacking from most of the factory farmed franchise exercises that pass through our offices with crushing regularity". Game Revolution complimented the game's story, graphical style, voice acting and soundtrack, while criticising the gameplay as "about as straightforward – and in some cases boring – as it gets for an FPS".

Electronic Gaming Monthly scored the game 6.5/6.5/6.5: Joe Fielder, the first reviewer, said, "You'd be hard-pressed to find a more visually stunning game than XIII", but complained that "numerous frustrations pile up to make XIII more chore than thrill". The magazine's Greg Ford, who provided the third review, said that its "style, cut-scenes, and story are all great, [but] the actual gameplay is pretty mundane"; he concluded, "But if all you need is a solid shooter fix, XIII will do just fine. It has no fatal flaws, and the conspiracy-laced story should keep you going".

==== Sales ====
Sales performance for XIII was lower than expected. In 2010, UGO ranked it #7 on the list of the games that need sequels.

=== Awards ===
At the first Spike Video Game Awards in 2003, XIII was nominated for the "Best Animation" category and "Best First Person Action" category, but lost to Dead or Alive Xtreme Beach Volleyball and Call of Duty respectively. XIII also received a nomination for "Outstanding Achievement in Original Music Composition" during the AIAS' 7th Annual Interactive Achievement Awards.

== Sequel and remakes ==
While the anticipated sequel on major gaming platforms remained unrealized due to poor sales of the original title, Gameloft released a follow-up on mobile phones titled XIII²: Covert Identity in October 2007, which was a side-scrolling game rather than a first-person shooter.

A re-imagining of XIII, called XIII: Lost Identity, was released by Anuman Interactive for Microsoft Windows, iPhone and iPad on November 15, 2011. The game is not a shooter, but a hidden object game.

On April 18, 2019, a remake of the original game was announced for Nintendo Switch, PlayStation 4, Windows, and Xbox One, which was developed by PlayMagic Ltd and published by Microids. It was originally scheduled for release on November 13, 2019, until it was delayed to 2020 for further development. It released on November 10, 2020, and was received extremely poorly by both consumers and critics, with Metacritic naming it the second worst game of the year, behind Tiny Racer for Nintendo Switch. Nearly two years after its release, Microids released an overhaul update of the remake by an entirely different studio, the France-based Tower Five, replacing PlayMagic.
