= XIII: The Conspiracy =

2008 Franco-Canadian television film

- Based on: XIII comic albums series by Jean Van Hamme and William Vance
- Screenplay by: David Wolkove; Philippe Lyon
- Directed by: Duane Clark
- Starring: Val Kilmer; Stephen Dorff
- Countries of origin: Canada; France
- Original language: English

Production
- Producer: Ken Gord
- Cinematography: David Greene
- Editor: Yann Hervé
- Running time: 86 min x 2 = 172 min.
- Production companies: Prodigy Pictures; Cipango Films
- Budget: $20 million

Original release
- Network: Canal+
- Release: October 6, 2008

XIII: The Conspiracy is a 2008 television film in two parts, based on the eponymous comic albums series by Belgian authors Jean Van Hamme and William Vance, about an amnesiac protagonist who seeks to discover his concealed past. The film served as a pilot for XIII: The Series, which aired on television in 2011.

The film was directed by Duane Clark, stars Val Kilmer and Stephen Dorff, and was produced by Prodigy Pictures and Cipango Films. It was first broadcast in France in October 2008 by Canal+, followed by NBC in the US in February 2009, by Nine in Australia (as The Conspiracy) in November 2009, and by Five in the United Kingdom in December 2009 (where it was shown as a single feature instead of in two parts).

== Plot ==
When the first female president of the United States, Sally Sheridan, (Mimi Kuzyk) is killed by a sniper, her assassin narrowly escapes after a shootout involving a shadowy figure named La Mangouste (Val Kilmer), or "The Mongoose". Three months later in West Virginia, an elderly couple discover an amnesiac young man (Stephen Dorff) wounded in a tree after parachuting from a plane. The only clue to his identity is a tattoo on his chest, "XIII", the Roman numeral for 13.

In the White House, a joint intelligence task force led by Colonel Amos (Greg Bryk) investigates the President's assassination while XIII searches online for information about his tattoo. The NSA traces him to the couple's home, where elite special forces kill the couple. XIII kills the soldiers and escapes to New York, where he befriends Sam (Caterina Murino), a photo shop owner who helps identify Kim (Jessalyn Gilsig), a woman in a photograph he carries.

Rogue Secret Service agents pursue XIII, who is eventually captured by La Mangouste. During his interrogation, La Mangouste reveals that "XIII" is the brand of a conspiracy. XIII escapes and returns to Sam, learning that the design on his chest also refers to secret societies of the Roman Empire. Photos developed by Sam for Kim lead him to Kellownee Valley.

Government intelligence identifies XIII as Steven Rowland and uses the media to intensify the manhunt. XIII is aided by Kim, her father General Carrington (Stephen McHattie), and Jones, a CIA operative. They reveal that he was a special operations agent who underwent facial reconstruction during an undercover mission to expose fascists plotting to overthrow the American government.

La Mangouste captures XIII again and kills Kim. He discovers that XIII has undergone reconstructive surgery and that his military file is classified. Another conspirator, "XIV", attacks XIII, but Jones helps him escape. President Galbrain (John Bourgeois) authorizes Calvin Wax (Jonathan Higgins), the White House Chief of Staff, to take control of the manhunt.

At an NSA safehouse, Carrington reveals that XIII is actually Ross Tanner, who lost his wife and daughter in the sarin gas attacks in Chicago. Carrington also explains that Col. Jack McCall (Scott Wickware) supervised XIII's paramilitary unit, which carried out the foreign attacks, and that the next major attack is planned for the upcoming election.

XIII and Jones travel to a decommissioned facility in northern Montana, where XIII finds McCall in a teleconference with Wax. When confronted, McCall commits suicide before revealing the attack's location. Evidence indicates that a nuclear strike will target a Maryland polling station on election day. Carrington confronts Amos and is arrested for high treason.

XIII and Jones investigate Jasper Winthrow, CEO of Standard Electronics, which owns Stratus Dynamics, a military contractor affected by the former president's plan to reduce America's presence in Iraq. Their investigation leads to a factory in Petersburg, Virginia, where XIII kills La Mangouste and discovers that Bethesda is the target. He arrives in time to stop the bomb from being delivered.

Wally Sheridan, the assassinated president's brother, wins the national election. XIII confronts Wax, who says it is "only the beginning" before killing himself. Carrington is released, and Sheridan publicly reveals the conspiracy and those responsible.

While in Japan, XIII and Jones discover that Ross Tanner's family never existed. They realize that Wally Sheridan had his sister killed to place the Vice President in office, then orchestrated the attacks to undermine confidence in the President and secure his own election, with the ultimate goal of establishing a dictatorship. Realizing they have been deceived, XIII tells Jones, "We're going back."

=== The XX ===
Number	Name	Position
I	Wally Sheridan	President-elect
II	Calvin Wax	Chief of Staff
III	Ellery Shipley	US Secretary of Defense
IV	Jasper Winthrow	CEO of Standard Electronic
V	???	???
VI	???	???
VII	???	???
VIII	???	???
IX	???	???
X	???	???
XI	Jack McCall	Colonel
XII	Mongoose	Assassin
XIII	Steve Rowland	Ex-Special Assault and Destroying Sections operative
XIV	Agent Kohn	Prison Interrogator, Homeland Security
XV	Unnamed Man	Tunnel Bomber
XVI	???	???
XVII	Kim Rowland	Steve Rowland's widow
XVIII	???	???
XIX	Unnamed Man	Armored Car Driver, Department of Energy
XX	Unnamed Woman	U.S. Customs Official

== Cast ==
- Stephen Dorff as XIII
- Val Kilmer as Mongoose
- John Bourgeois as President Joseph K. Galbrain
- Stephen McHattie as General Ben Carrington
- Greg Bryk as Colonel Samuel Amos
- Lucinda Davis as Major Lauren Jones
- Jessalyn Gilsig as Kim Rowland
- Caterina Murino as Sam Taylor
- Ted Atherton as Walter "Wally" Sheridan
- Daniel DeSanto as Tech Agent
- Mimi Kuzyk as President Sally Sheridan, the first female President of the United States
- Barbara Gordon as Martha
- Julian Richings as Cody
- Jacqueline Pillon as XX

== Broadcasters ==
Country	Broadcaster	Date
France	Canal +	October 6–13, 2008
United States	NBC	February 8–15, 2009
Australia	Nine Network	November 1–8, 2009
United Kingdom	Five	December 27, 2009
Austria	ATV	January 15, 2010
Spain	Antena 3	April 1, 2010
Germany	13th Street	April 16–18, 2010
South Africa	SABC 3	August 29 – September 5, 2010
Canada	Showcase	2010
Bulgaria	AXN (subtitles) bTV (dubbed)	April 4–5, 2010; April 16–17, 2011
Netherlands	BNN; RTL 7	June 9–10, 2011; July 8, 2014
Belgium	VT4	December 22–29, 2011
Thailand	Channel 7	January 11–12, 2012
China	HBO Asia	February 2012
India	HBO India	
Hungary	RTL Klub	February 2, 2012
Indonesia	Premiere Channel	2015

== Reception ==
At Metacritic, the miniseries has a weighted average score of 44 out of 100 based on 6 critics, indicating "mixed or average reviews". Its best reviews came from The Hollywood Reporter, who said "All in all, this isn't a half-bad political thriller". On the other side, USA Today said "Poorly cast and performed (including an embarrassing turn by Val Kilmer), XIII is shot so murkily and staged so badly, you can hardly tell where people are, let alone where they're going".
