= Duane Clark =

American film director

- Born: Duane Bradley Clark; March 31, 1963 (age 63); Philadelphia, Pennsylvania, U.S.
- Education: University of California, Los Angeles
- Occupations: Film/television director, producer and screenwriter
- Years active: 1981–present
- Father: Dick Clark

Duane Bradley Clark (born March 31, 1963) is an American–Canadian television director, producer and screenwriter. He is the son of television personality Dick Clark and his second wife, Loretta Martin.

He attended the film program at UCLA, where he graduated with honors and was inducted into Phi Beta Kappa and was a member of the Lambda Chi Alpha fraternity.

He directed episodes for a number of television series, Highlander: The Series, Dark Angel, The Practice, Boston Public, CSI: Crime Scene Investigation, CSI: Miami, CSI: NY and the mini-series XIII.

Clark has been a resident of the US and the UK (2005–14), and he has dual citizenship of the US and Canada.

== Filmography ==
- Brand New Life (TV series, 1989, writer)
- Shaking the Tree (Feature film, 1990, also writer)
- Bitter Harvest (Feature film, 1993)
- Highlander: The Series (2 episodes, 1996)
- Soulmates (Independent film, 1997, also producer and writer)
- Total Security (2 episodes, 1997)
- Protector (TV film, 1998)
- Stargate SG-1 (1 episode, 1998)
- The Practice (7 episodes, 2000–01)
- Providence (2 episodes, 2000–01)
- Boston Public (3 episodes, 2001–03)
- Dark Angel (1 episode, 2001)
- Kiss My Act (TV film, 2001)
- Gilda Radner: It's Always Something (TV film, 2002)
- girls club (1 episode, 2002)
- The Guardian (1 episode, 2003)
- One Tree Hill (2 episodes, 2003–04)
- CSI: Crime Scene Investigation (4 episodes, 2004–06)
- CSI: Miami (7 episodes, 2004–06)
- CSI: NY (10 episodes, 2005–12)
- Medium (2 episodes, 2005)
- Jericho (1 episodes, 2006)
- Meadowlands (4 episodes, 2007)
- XIII: The Conspiracy (2 episodes, 2008)
- Crusoe (2 episodes, 2008)
- The Philanthropist (1 episode, 2009)
- Three Rivers (1 episode, 2009)
- Mercy (1 episode, 2009)
- Hawaii Five-0 (8 episodes, 2011–2020)
- XIII: The Series (3 episodes, 2011-12)
- Vegas (3 episodes, 2012–13)
- Hostages (1 episode, 2013)
- Helix (2 episodes, 2014)
- Graceland (2 episodes, 2014–15)
- The Messengers (2 episodes, 2015)
- Of Kings and Prophets (2 episodes, 2016)
- APB (2 episodes, 2017)
- Somewhere Between (2 episodes, 2017)
- MacGyver (4 episodes, 2017–20)
- Magnum P.I. (1 episode, 2018)
