= Queen Margot (comics) =

- The first book in the series The Age of Innocence

Publication information
- Publisher: Théloma (French); Cinebook (English)
- Genre: Graphic novel
- No. of issues: 3 (in French); 3 (in English)

Creative team
- Written by: Olivier Cadic & Gheysens
- Artist: Juliette Derenne

Queen Margot is a Franco-Belgian graphic novel series written by Olivier Cadic and François Gheysens, illustrated by Juliette Derenne and published by Chapeau Bas (Cinebook French Imprint) in French and Cinebook in English. Queen Margot is about the life of Margaret of Valois, who was Queen of France from 1589 to 1599.

== Volumes ==
1. Le Duc de Guise – May 2006 ISBN 2-84998-047-1
2. Le roi de Navarre – April 2007 ISBN 978-0-9555401-1-0
3. Le comte de la mole – May 2008 ISBN 978-0-9555401-2-7

== Translations ==
Cinebook Ltd published Queen Margot. The three albums have been released:

1. The Age of Innocence – July 2006 ISBN 978-1-905460-10-6
2. The Bloody Wedding – April 2007 ISBN 978-1-905460-19-9
3. Endangered Love – May 2008 ISBN 978-1-905460-41-0
