= Alcante =

Belgian comics writer

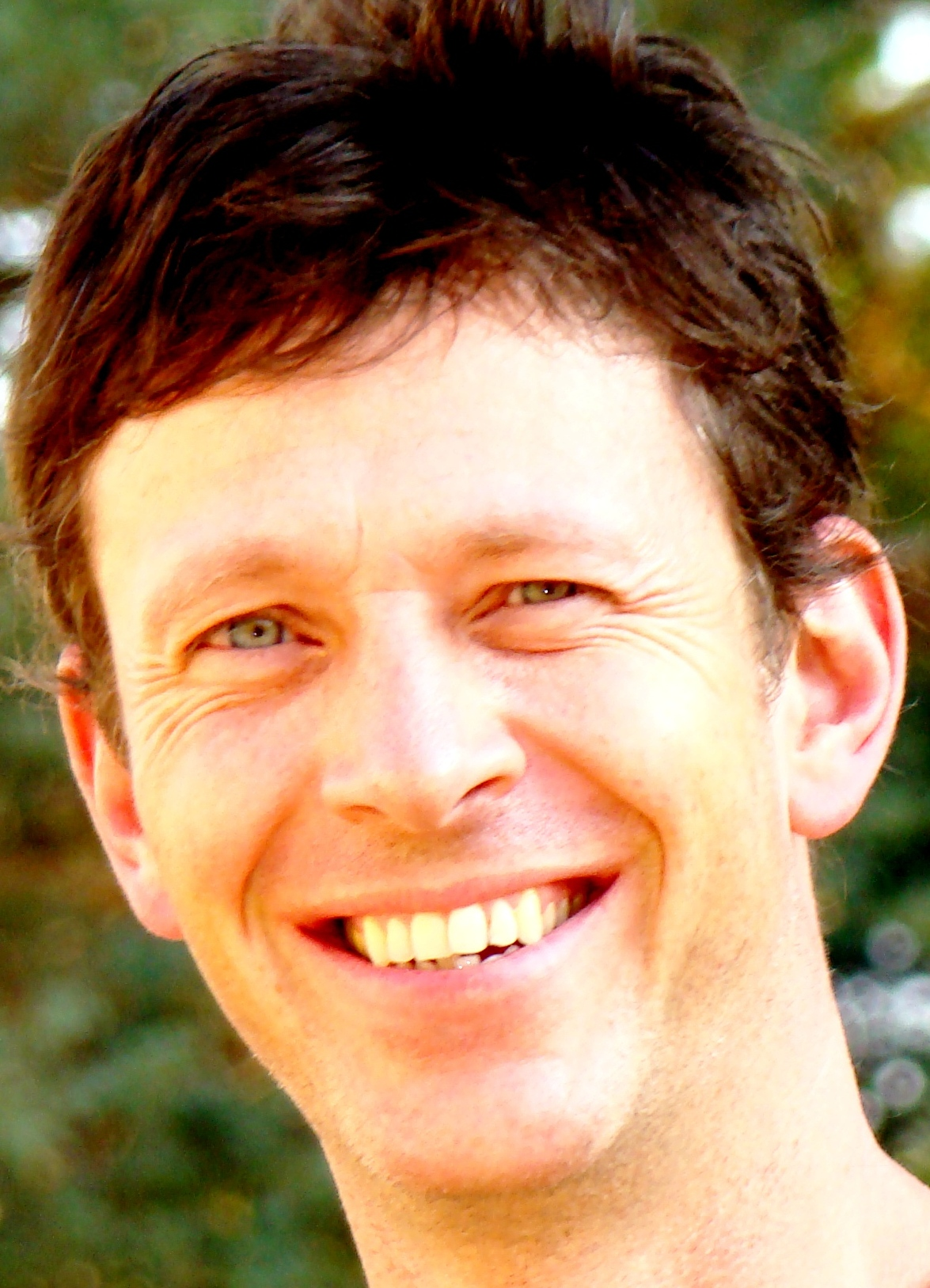
- Didier Swysen, alias Alcante
- Born: Didier Swysen; November 21, 1970 (age 56) Belgium
- Area: Writer
- Notable works: Pandora Box

Alcante, pen name of Didier Swysen (born 21 November 1970, Belgium) is a Belgian comics writer, best known for his series Pandora’s Box.

== Biography ==
Alcante has studied economic sciences and worked in academic research, when he won a comics writing contest of publisher Dupuis in 1995. The winning story was published in Spirou magazine. It took another seven years before he regularly began to publish short stories there. Pandora Box is his first series. He is the younger brother of comics creator Bernard Swysen.

== Bibliography ==
- Pandora Box, Dupuis, 8 volumes, 2005–2006, with seven different artists: Didier Pagot, Vujadin Radovanović, Steven Dupré, Roland Pignault, Erik Juszezak, Alain Henriet, and Damour. The first three volumes have been translated in English by Cinebook Ltd as Pandora's Box in 2008 and 2009.
- Jason Brice, Dupuis, 3 volumes, 2008–2010, art by Milan Jovanović
- Quelques jours ensemble, Dupuis,1 volume, 2008, art by Fanny Montgermont
- Rani, Dargaud, 1 volume, 2009, synopsis by Jean Van Hamme, art by Francis Vallès

An album in the series XIII Mystery focusing on Colonel Amos, with artwork by François Boucq, is planned for 2010.

Other new work includes Re-Mind with Andrea Mutti, Clair-Obscur with Fanny Montgermont, and La Conjuration de Cluny with Luca Malisan.
