= Genetiks =

Genetiks is a French 3 issues comics created by Richard Marazano and Jean-Michel Ponzio. It was first published in France by Futuropolis Publishing, starting from 2006, and translated into English by Archaia.

== Awards ==
- 2008 prix Bob-Morane of best comics in Utopiales international science fiction convention in Nantes (France).

== Story ==
Genetiks is a pharmaceutical company on the cutting edge of biological science. Thomas Hale is one of thousands of employees in the Genetiks' labs. Like his colleagues, he had agreed to give a drop of blood to his employers; a drop of blood that will allow the researchers at the company he works for to decode his entire genome. As the drop of blood is the property of Genetiks, Thomas will become, in effect, the first man to be privately owned by the corporation he works for.
