= Western (comics) =

- The cover of the comic featuring a character.

Publication information
- Publisher: Le Lombard (French); Cinebook (English)
- Format: Ongoing series
- Genre: Graphic novel for young adults
- No. of issues: 1 (in French); 1 (in English); 1 (in Tamil)

Creative team
- Written by: Jean Van Hamme
- Artist: Grzegorz Rosinski

Western is a Franco-Belgian one shot comic written by Jean Van Hamme, illustrated by Grzegorz Rosinski and published by Le Lombard in French and Cinebook in English.

== Story ==
In this comic, Ambrosius Van Deer comes to Fort Laramie to meet Jess Chisum, a young man who claims he's found Van Deer's nephew Eddie. Ten years before, Edwyn Van Deer had disappeared after his family was killed in a Lakota raid. The proof of his identity is a silver watch with a picture of his parents. However, fate has other plans than a happy family reunion, and the events of that day set in motion a tragedy 15 years in the making.

== Volume ==
Western - May 2001 ISBN 2-8036-1662-9

== Translations ==
Cinebook Ltd plans to publish Western in June 2011
