= Olivier Cadic =

French politician (born 1962)

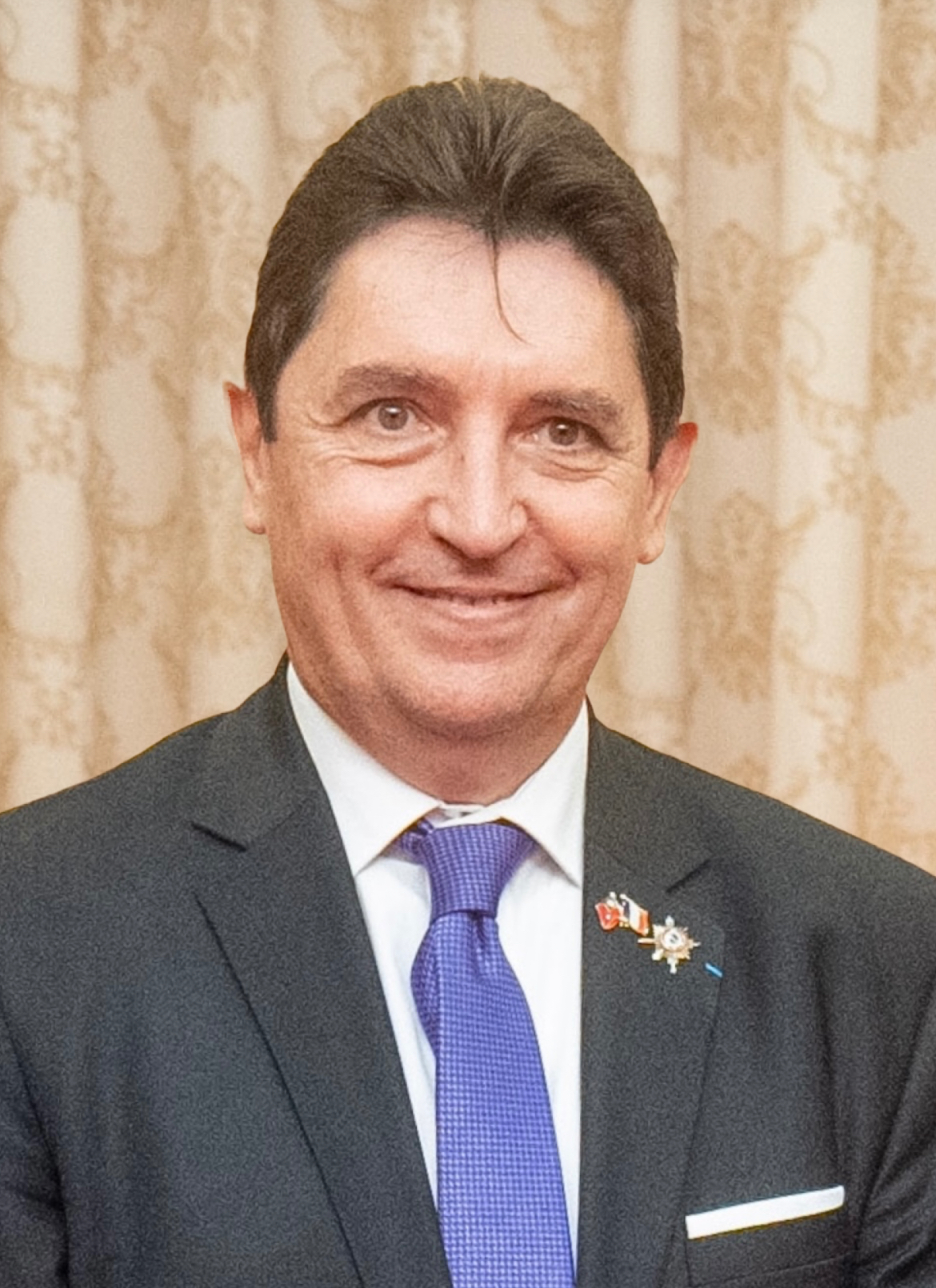
- Cadic in 2023

Member of the Senate
- Incumbent
- Assumed office 1 October 2014
- Constituency: Citizens abroad

Personal details
- Born: 22 April 1962 (age 63)
- Party: Union of Democrats and Independents

Olivier Cadic (born 22 April 1962) is a French politician serving as a member of the Senate since 2014. In 2005, he founded Cinebook. In the 2012 legislative election, he was a candidate for the National Assembly in the third constituency for citizens abroad.
