= Lady S =

Comic series

- The first book in the series, Here's to Suzie, featuring the main character.

Publication information
- Publisher: Dupuis (French); Cinebook (English)
- Genre: Graphic novel for young adults
- No. of issues: 15 (in French); 5 (in English)

Creative team
- Written by: Jean Van Hamme
- Artist: Philippe Aymond

Lady S is a Franco-Belgian comic book series written by Jean Van Hamme, illustrated by Philippe Aymond and published by Dupuis in French and Cinebook in English.

== Story ==
The story follows Susan, also named as Lady S, who is an agent working for the secretive non-governmental organisation called the Centre for Anti-Terrorism Research and Intelligence Gathering (CATRIG). She is also the aide to her adopted father who is a USA diplomat. Previously she had been a refugee and a thief. CATRIG is an organisation and nobody has clue on that. It has been run by a group of retired intelligence officers of EU. Susan is an adopted daughter and principal collaborator of James Fitzroy, a roving ambassador and special correspondent for the American Secretary of State in Europe. Susan is a clever, multilingual young woman, in full bloom and perfectly happy in the eyes of an attentive father, but this too-perfect happiness hides many faults, sorrows and mysteries.

== Volumes ==
1. Na zdorovié, Shaniouchka! - Oct. 2004 ISBN 2-8001-3608-1
2. A ta santé, Suzie! - Sept. 2005 ISBN 2-8001-3660-X
3. 59° Latitude Nord - Oct. 2006 ISBN 2-8001-3836-X
4. Jeu de dupes - Oct. 2007 ISBN 978-2-8001-3929-6
5. Une taupe à Washington - Nov. 2008 ISBN 978-2-8001-4069-8
6. Salade portugaise - Oct. 2009 ISBN 978-2-8001-4475-7
7. Une seconde d'éternité - Apr. 2011 ISBN 978-2-8001-4743-7
8. Raison d'État - Aug. 2012 ISBN 978-2-8001-5430-5
9. Pour la peau d'une femme - Nov. 2013 ISBN 978-2-8001-5756-6
10. ADN - Nov. 2014 ISBN 978-2-8001-6252-2
11. La faille - Nov. 2015
12. Rapport de forces - Nov. 2016
13. Crimes de guerre - Nov. 2017
14. Code Vampiir - Nov. 2019
15. Dans la gueule du tigre - Aug. 2021

== Translations ==
Cinebook is publishing Lady S. The following albums have been released:

1. Here's to Suzie (includes "Na zdorovié, Shaniouchka!") - Nov. 2008 ISBN 978-1-905460-72-4
2. Latitude 59 Degrees North - March 2010 ISBN 978-1-84918-024-5
3. Game of Fools - Oct. 2011 ISBN 978-1-84918-096-2
4. A Mole in D.C. - July 2013 ISBN 978-1-84918-163-1
5. Portuguese Medley - Nov. 2014 ISBN 978-1-84918-222-5
6. A Second of Eternity - 2018 ISBN 978-1-84918-421-2
