= Jean-Michel Ponzio =

French comics artist and illustrator (born 1967)

Jean-Michel Ponzio (born 30 January 1967) is a French comics artist, animator and illustrator.

== Biography ==
In 1985 he received a degree as technical designer in Marseille. In the following year he studied at the School of Applied Arts and Jobs in Paris, and, in 1989, he obtained a further degree in "communication images" at Toulouse.

His first short movie, Aller Retour, was broadcast by Canal+ and won an award at the Festival of Gerardmer in 1991. In 1991-1993, Ponzio dedicated himself to 3D short movies and, in 1996-2000, he worked as scenario designer for movies such as Batman & Robin, S1m0ne and others. His first comics cover was published in 2001.

A science fiction fan since his youth, Ponzio released a comic book in this genre, Dernier exil, which was published in two albums by Editions Carabas. Later, he met with writer Richard Marazano, with whom he collaborated in several science fiction comics, such as Genetiks (2007-2011), The Chimpanzee Complex (2007-2011) and The Pelican Protocol (2011-2013).

In 2012 he replaced Paul Gillon as the artist in the thriller series L'Ordre de Cicéron, written by Richard Malka and published by Glénat.
