= XIII (2020 video game) =

Video game remake

- Developer: PlayMagic (Note: Tower Five developed the 2022 update, along with the Nintendo Switch version.)
- Publisher: Microids
- Director: Giuseppe Crugliano
- Producer: James Tuner
- Designer: Julius Carter
- Programmer: Dmitry Shtainer
- Artist: Nick Kasolos
- Engine: Unity
- Platforms: Nintendo Switch; PlayStation 4; PlayStation 5; Windows; Xbox One; Xbox Series X/S
- Release: PlayStation 4, Windows, Xbox One; November 10, 2020; Nintendo Switch, PlayStation 5, Xbox Series X/S; September 13, 2022
- Genres: First-person shooter, stealth
- Modes: Single-player, multiplayer

XIII is a first-person shooter game developed by PlayMagic and published by Microids. It is a remake of the 2003 video game of the same name. The game was released for PlayStation 4, Windows, and Xbox One in November 2020. Updated versions for Nintendo Switch, PlayStation 5, and Xbox Series X/S were released in September 2022.

XIII received negative reviews from critics and players. It was criticized for its changes to the art style, game design differences from the original, and the game's numerous technical and audio issues. Microids issued an apology for the game's technical issues on launch and later released a major new update for the game in September 2022, this time developed by Tower Five, in an effort to improve the remake's quality.

== Development and release ==
The remake of XIII was announced on April 18, 2019, with PlayMagic developing the game and Microids publishing it for Nintendo Switch, PlayStation 4, Windows, and Xbox One. The game was originally scheduled to release on November 13, until it was delayed to 2020 for further development. In June 2020, it was announced that the game would release for PlayStation 4, Windows, and Xbox One on November 10. In October 2020, it was announced that the Nintendo Switch version was delayed to 2021.

The original plan was to remaster the game using original assets and Unity plug-ins. Unfortunately, the original source code was deemed lost and the 2003 version was running in an extremely outdated game engine. Therefore, the team had no choice but to redo the entire game from scratch, which required the team to hire new staff and extend development to remake the levels, assets, cutscenes, and animations.

According to former staff of PlayMagic, it was reported that CEO and creative director Giuseppe Crugliano was to be blamed for the game's failure due to poor project management, a lack of staff, low morale, and toxic company culture. Crugliano denied these allegations but admitted to a problem with late payments, claiming they were the result of cash flow problems from project cancellations and unpaid fees from clients.

Due to the poor reception to the game, Microids announced in June 2022 that they had replaced PlayMagic with Tower Five as the developer, who had been working on fixing the issues from the 2020 release. Microids released the improved version for Nintendo Switch, PlayStation 5, and Xbox Series X/S on September 13, 2022, as well as updating the 2020 version.

== Reception ==
=== Critical reception ===
Reception

Aggregate scores
| Aggregator | Score |
|---|---|
| Metacritic | PC: 29/100; PS4: 41/100; XONE: 38/100; PS5: 55/100 |
| OpenCritic | 10% recommend |

Review scores
| Publication | Score |
|---|---|
| Hardcore Gamer | 1.5/5 |
| Jeuxvideo.com | 6/20 |
| Push Square | 5/10 (Note: 2022 version) |

XIII received "generally unfavorable" reviews from critics for most platforms, while the PS5 version received "mixed or average" reviews, according to review aggregator website Metacritic. Fellow review aggregator OpenCritic assessed that the game received weak approval, being recommended by 10% of critics.

A lot of criticism were aimed towards the remake's unnecessary changes from the original, such as the art style and the weapon limit, as well as the game's numerous technical and audio issues. Developer PlayMagic and publisher Microids issued a joint statement apologizing to players for the state of the game at release, adding that the COVID-19 pandemic had significantly affected the game's production. On Steam, the game received an "Overwhelmingly Negative" rating from players.

=== Sales ===
The release of the remake caused an increase in sales of the 2003 original game, causing the original to outsell the remake in the first week of the remake's release in the United Kingdom.
