= Youri Jigounov =

Russian comic writer and artist

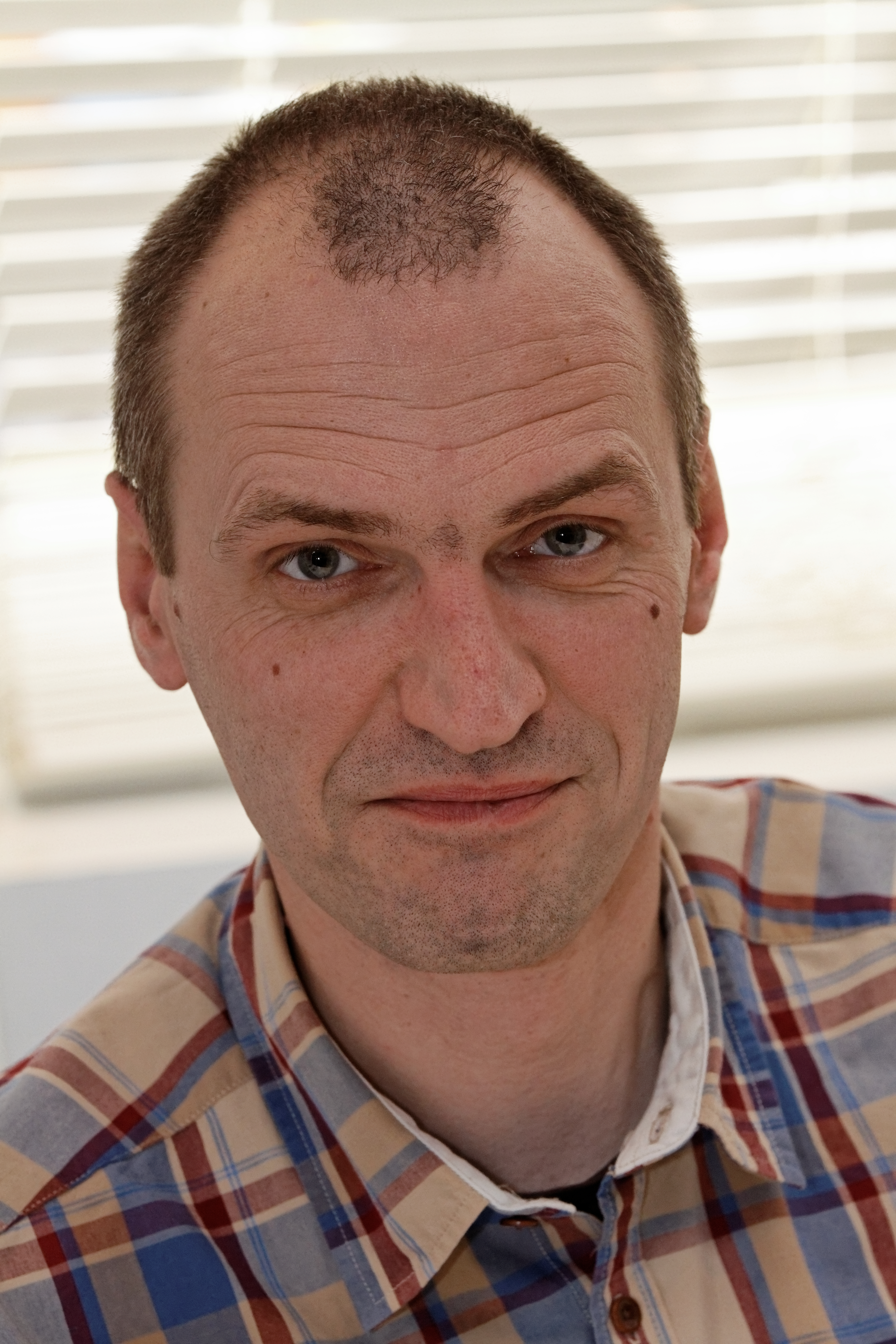
- Born: Youri Jigounov; October 22, 1967 (age 58); Moscow, Russia

Youri Jigounov (Russian: Юрий Жигунов), is a Russian comic writer and artist. .

== Works ==
- Attached to a non-album series:
  - Yuri Jigounov only:
    - Letters of Krivtsov, The Lombard Collection "One Shot", Brussels, February 1995, 48 p., (ISBN 2-8036-1131-7) or (ISBN 978-2-8036-1131-7).
- Series "Alpha"
  - Yuri Jigounov (drawings) and Pascal Renard (scenario):
    1. 1996: The Exchange, The Lombard al. "Third Wave", Brussels, 1997, 48 p., (ISBN 2-8036-1432-4) (reissue March 1999).
    2. January 1997: Clan Bogdanov, The Lombard al. "Third Wave", Brussels, 1997, 48 p., (ISBN 2-8036-1431-6) (reissue March 2001).
  - Yuri Jigounov (drawings) and Mythic (scenario):
    1. January 1998: The Wages of wolves, The Lombard al. "Third Wave", Brussels, 1998, 48 p., (ISBN 2-8036-1430-8) (reissue March 2001).
    2. March 1999: The List, The Lombard al. "Third Wave", Brussels, 1999, 48 p., (ISBN 2-8036-1383-2) (reissue December 2000).
    3. October 2000: Sanctions, Le Lombard, et al. "Third Wave", Brussels, October 2000, 48 p., (ISBN 2-8036-1486-3).
    4. April 2002: The Emissary The Lombard al. "Third Wave", Brussels, 2002, 48 p., (ISBN 2-8036-1639-4).
    5. October 2003: Snow White, 30 seconds!, Le Lombard, coll. "Third Wave", Brussels, 2003, 48 p., (ISBN 2-8036-1835-4).
    6. November 2004: Games of powerful, Le Lombard, et al. "Third Wave", Brussels, 2004, 48 p., (ISBN 2-8036-2036-7).
    7. September 15, 2006: Scala, Le Lombard, et al. "Third Wave", Brussels, 2006, 48 p. (ISBN 978-2-8036-2094-4).
    8. 11 May 2007: Lies, The Lombard al. "Third Wave", Brussels, 2007, 48 p. (ISBN 978-2-8036-2249-8).

Yuri Jigounov (drawings and screenplay)

  - September 10, 2009: Fucking patriot, Le Lombard, et al. "Third Wave", Brussels, 2009, 56 p. (ISBN 978-2-8036-2456-0).

The first three albums of the Alpha series were reissued on 3 November 2005, grouped under the heading "Alpha Integral: An agent in Moscow," The Lombard al. "Third Wave", Brussels, 2005, 146 p. (ISBN 978-2-8036-2125-5).
