= Belgian Comic Strip Center =

Museum of Belgian comics in Brussels, Belgium

- Centre belge de la bande dessinée (French); Belgisch Stripcentrum (Dutch)
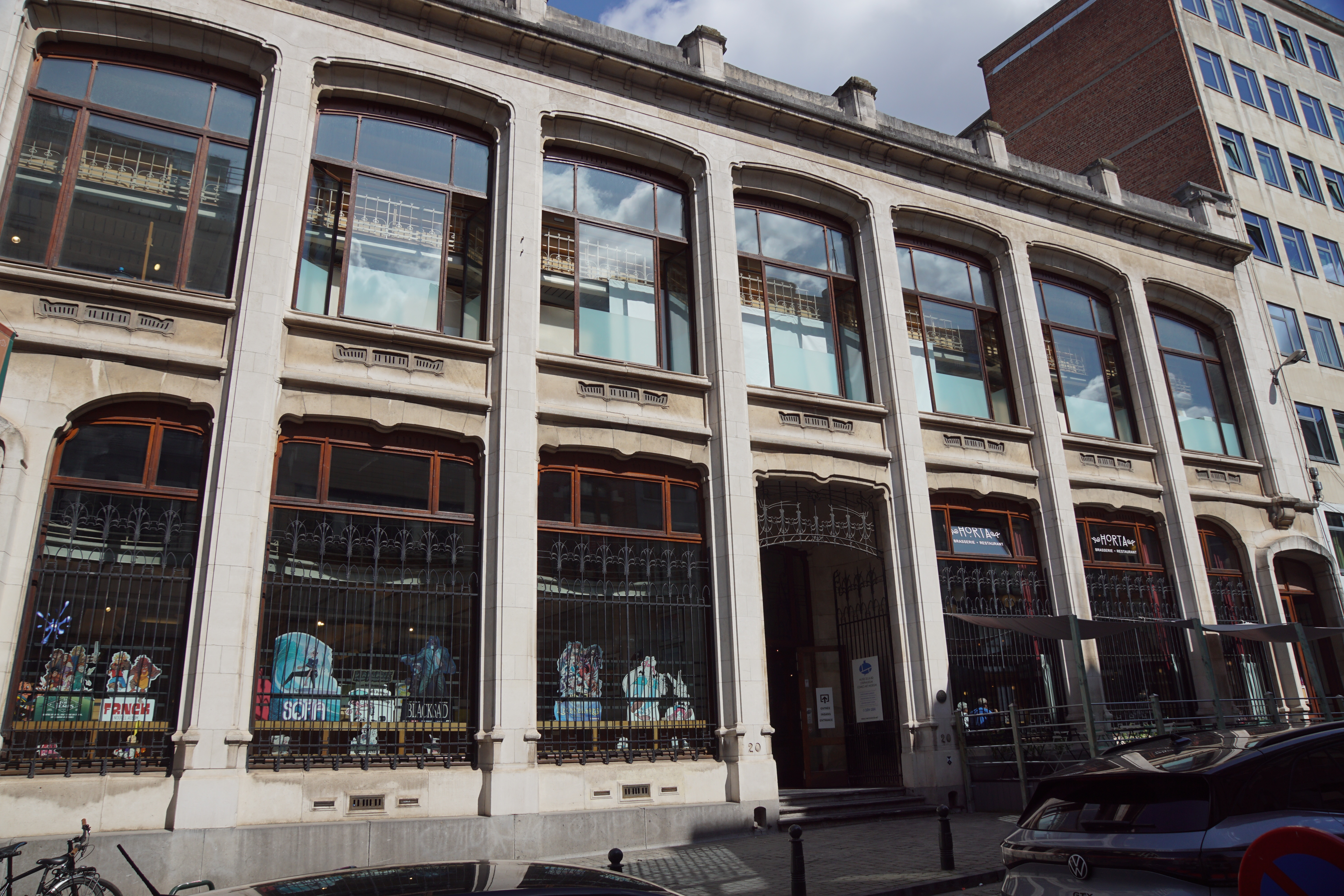
- Exterior of the museum
- Interactive fullscreen map
- Established: 6 October 1989; 36 years ago
- Location: Rue des Sables / Zandstraat 20, 1000 City of Brussels, Brussels-Capital Region, Belgium
- Coordinates: 50°51′04″N 4°21′36″E
- Type: Belgian comics
- Visitors: More than 200,000 per year
- Public transit access: Brussels-Congress and Brussels-Central; 1 5 Gare Centrale/Centraal Station
- Website: www.comicscenter.net/en/home

The Belgian Comic Strip Center (French: Centre belge de la bande dessinée; Dutch: Belgisch Stripcentrum), also known as the Comic Art Museum (French: Musée de la bande dessinée; Dutch: Stripmuseum), is a museum in central Brussels, Belgium, dedicated to Belgian comics. It is located at 20, rue des Sables/Zandstraat, in an Art Nouveau building designed by Victor Horta to house the former Magasins Waucquez.

== History ==
=== Magasins Waucquez (1906–1970) ===
The building that would later house the Belgian Comic Strip Center was inaugurated in 1906 as the Magasins Waucquez, designed in Art Nouveau style by the architect Victor Horta to serve as a large fabric store for the textile baron Charles Waucquez. This period, in the late 19th to early 20th centuries, coincided with the beginnings of modern comic strips.

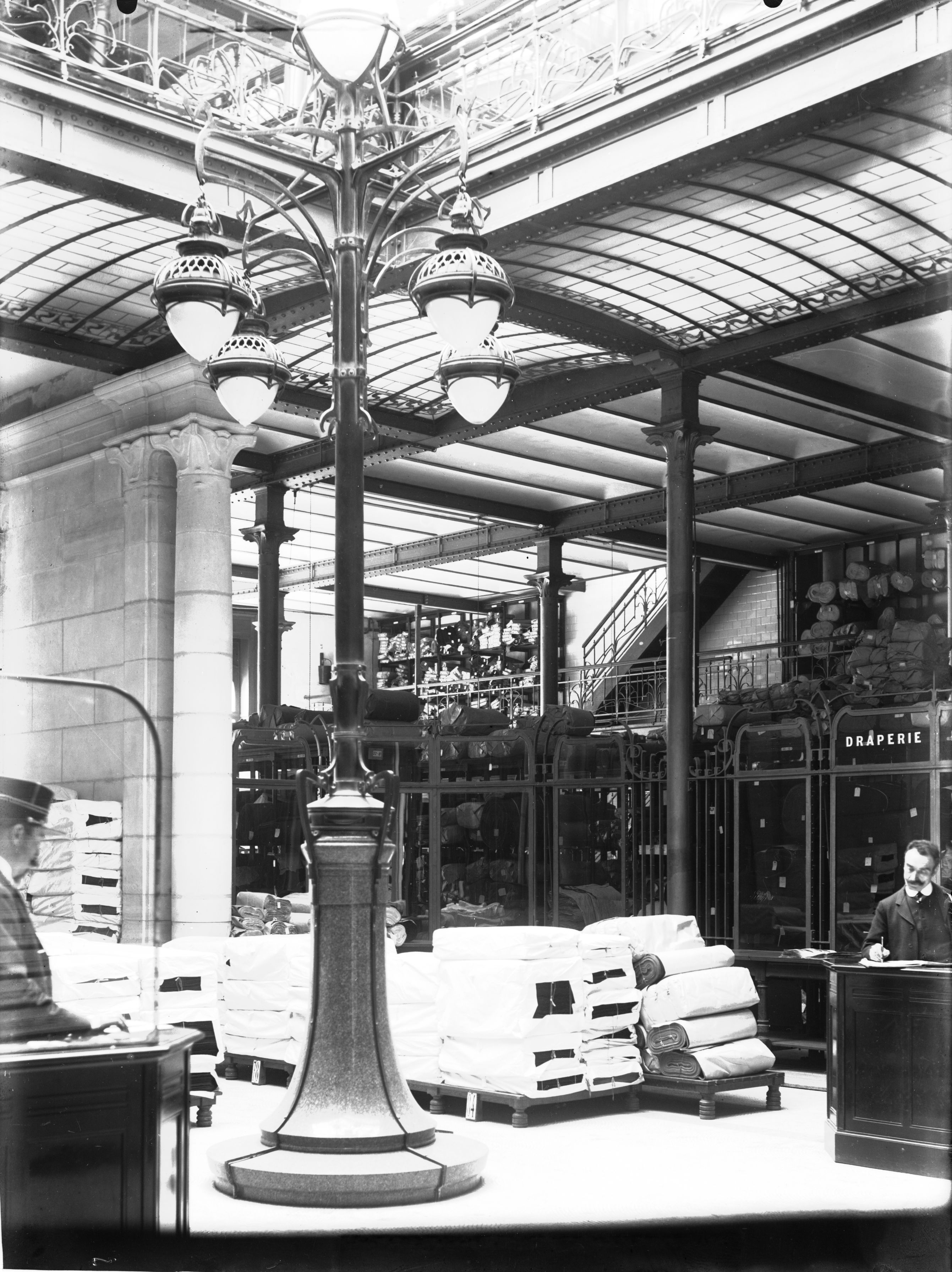
Entrance hall of the Magasins Waucquez, early 20th century

After Waucquez's death in 1920, the building began to languish away, and in 1970, the firm closed its doors. The architect Jean Delhaye, a former student and aide of Horta, brought the endangered Waucquez building to the attention of the state, and by 16 October 1975, because of its connection to Horta, it was designated a historic monument. Still, the building was in bad shape and victim to a lot of vandalism.

=== Restoration and new function ===
In 1980, the architect Jean Breydel and the comics artists François Schuiten, Bob de Moor, Alain Baran, Guy Dessicy, and Hergé, planned to restore the building and give it a new destination as a museum dedicated to the history of Belgian comics. Originally, the museum would be a homage to Hergé, but he suggested honouring the entire Belgian comics industry. In 1983, the Minister of Public Works, Louis Olivier, purchased the building from the owners' heirs on behalf of the Belgian government's Régie des Bâtiments (English: Buildings Agency), making it national property. In 1984, the Belgian Comic Strip Center (French: Centre belge de la bande dessinée, Dutch: Belgisch Centrum voor het Beeldverhaal) was founded as a non-profit organisation, with Bob De Moor as its first chairman. A fund was established bringing together several Flemish and Walloon comics artists.

In 1986, the launch of the project was celebrated, despite the building still being in ruins. Intensive lobbying, including a luncheon at the Royal Palace and a soirée with the Belgian comic strip community, helped secure the project. Restoration work began in 1987, coordinated by the architect Christian Lelubre and executed by Pierre Van Assche, who designed the plans. The restoration included updating the building to modern standards, while respecting Horta's original work. The mosaics were flown over from Italy and constructed by Italian mosaic workers due to the profession being largely obsolete in Belgium.

=== Belgian Comic Strip Center (1989–present) ===
On 6 October 1989, the museum was officially inaugurated in the presence of King Baudouin and Queen Fabiola. Over the following decades, the Belgian Comic Strip Center became a major museum with international appeal, welcoming around 200,000 visitors annually, while government subsidies accounted for less than 10% of its working budget. By 2015, the museum began redecorating its permanent exhibition, continuing its mission as a promotional tool, exhibition venue, research centre, and cultural ambassador for Belgian comics and Art Nouveau architecture.

Since 2009, directly across the street from the Belgian Comic Strip Center, another comics-themed museum opened, the Marc Sleen Museum, dedicated to the work of Belgian comics artist Marc Sleen. On 30 January 2023, it was announced that the museum would close in the autumn, with part of its collection being integrated into the Belgian Comic Strip Center.

== Building ==
The building was designed in 1905 by Victor Horta in Art Nouveau style and completed in 1906 as a textile department store. It is the only surviving example of a series of Horta's department stores, notable for its use of iron and glass, a central atrium, and a monumental staircase. The building was protected as a monument in 1975 and renovated in 1988–89 to restore its architectural details while adapting it for public use.

The structure is rectangular, with two storeys under a low-pitched roof and two large glass domes. The façade is symmetrical, slightly concave, and built from natural stone, with vertical pilasters forming curved arches above the main openings. Doors and windows were restored to their original designs, with wrought iron guards on the ground floor and decorative railings above.

The interior is open-plan with two main levels and a mezzanine, featuring exposed beams on cast iron columns, vaulted ceilings, and decorative elements such as marble mosaic floors, stained glass, and a monumental stone staircase with iron railings.

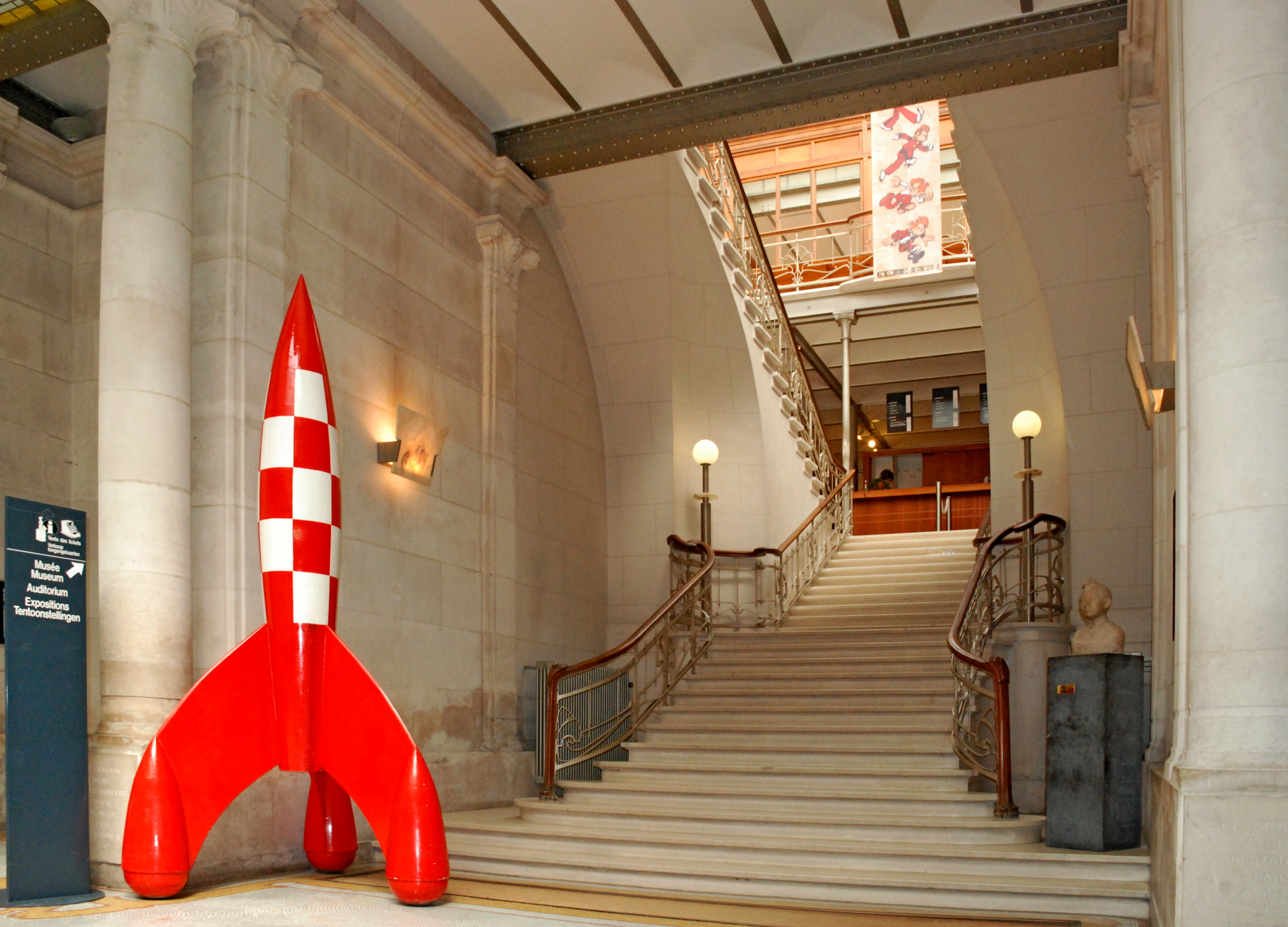
Entrance staircase

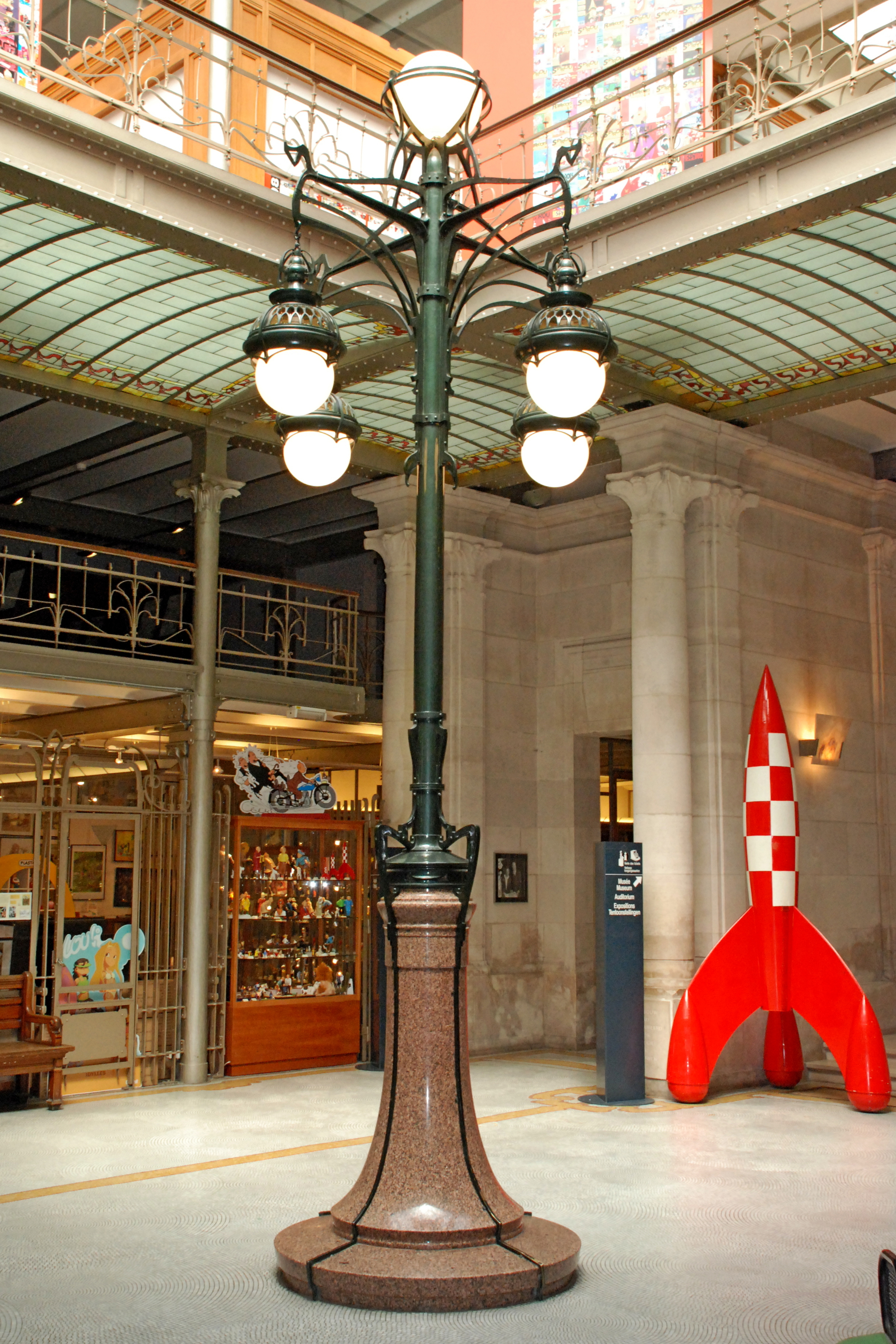
Art Nouveau lamppost

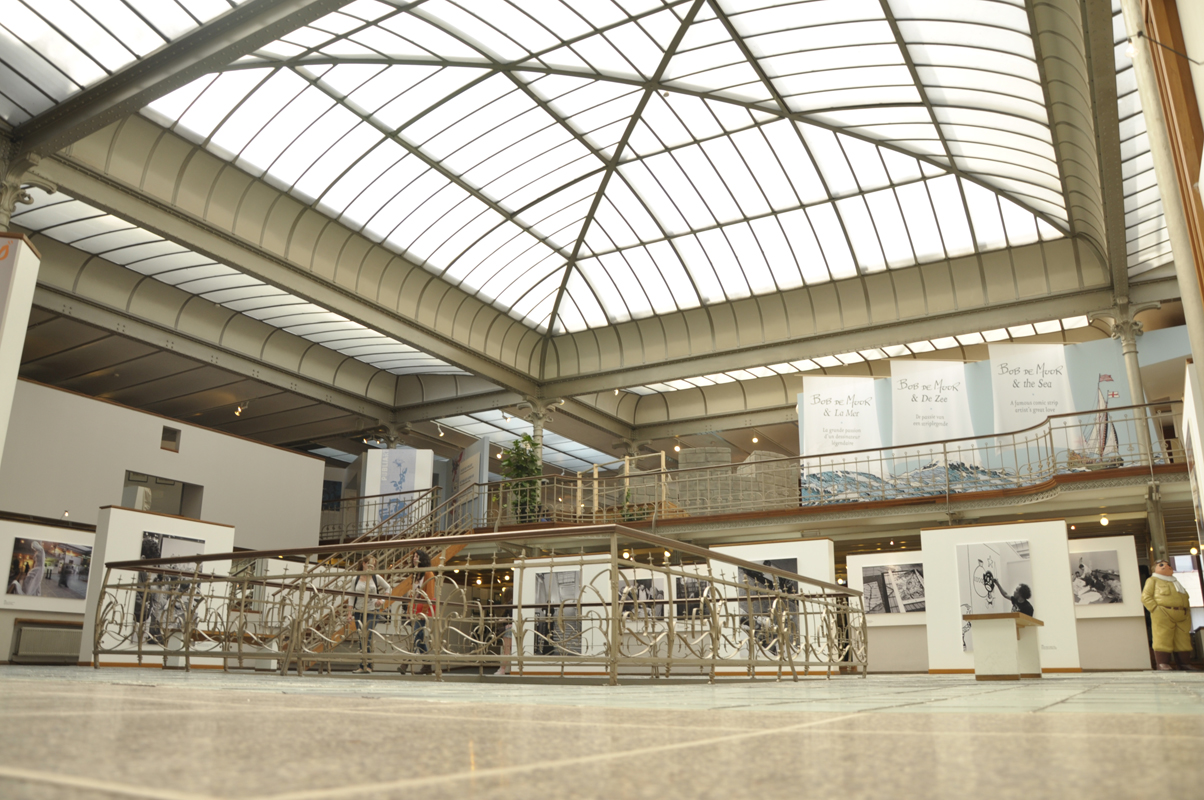
Main skylight on the second floor

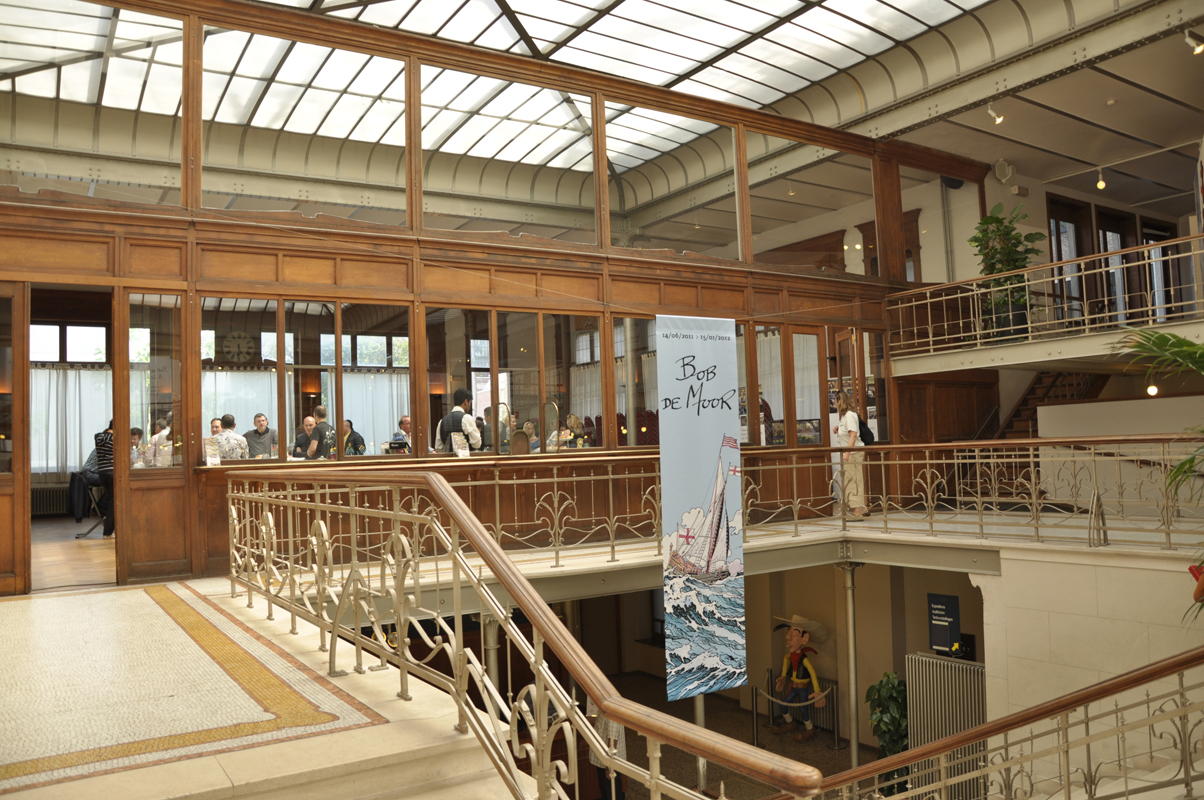
Second floor

== Museum ==
The ground floor of the museum houses a restaurant, a room dedicated to Victor Horta, a comics store named "Slumberland" after Little Nemo in Slumberland, a library with a reading room and a study centre. The first floor has an auditorium, a room with original comic book pages by various artists and a room dedicated to animation, more specifically the Belgian animation industry, such as Belvision.

The second floor has a permanent exhibition dedicated to the chronological history of the medium in Belgium called "The Museum of Imagination". The exhibit starts off with Hergé and ends with Peyo, covering the pioneers of Belgian comics between 1929 and 1958 and with special focus on the magazines Spirou and Tintin. Each artist has a room dedicated to his work and designed in a playful way.

The final floor is dedicated to the merchandising of comics and available for temporary exhibitions.

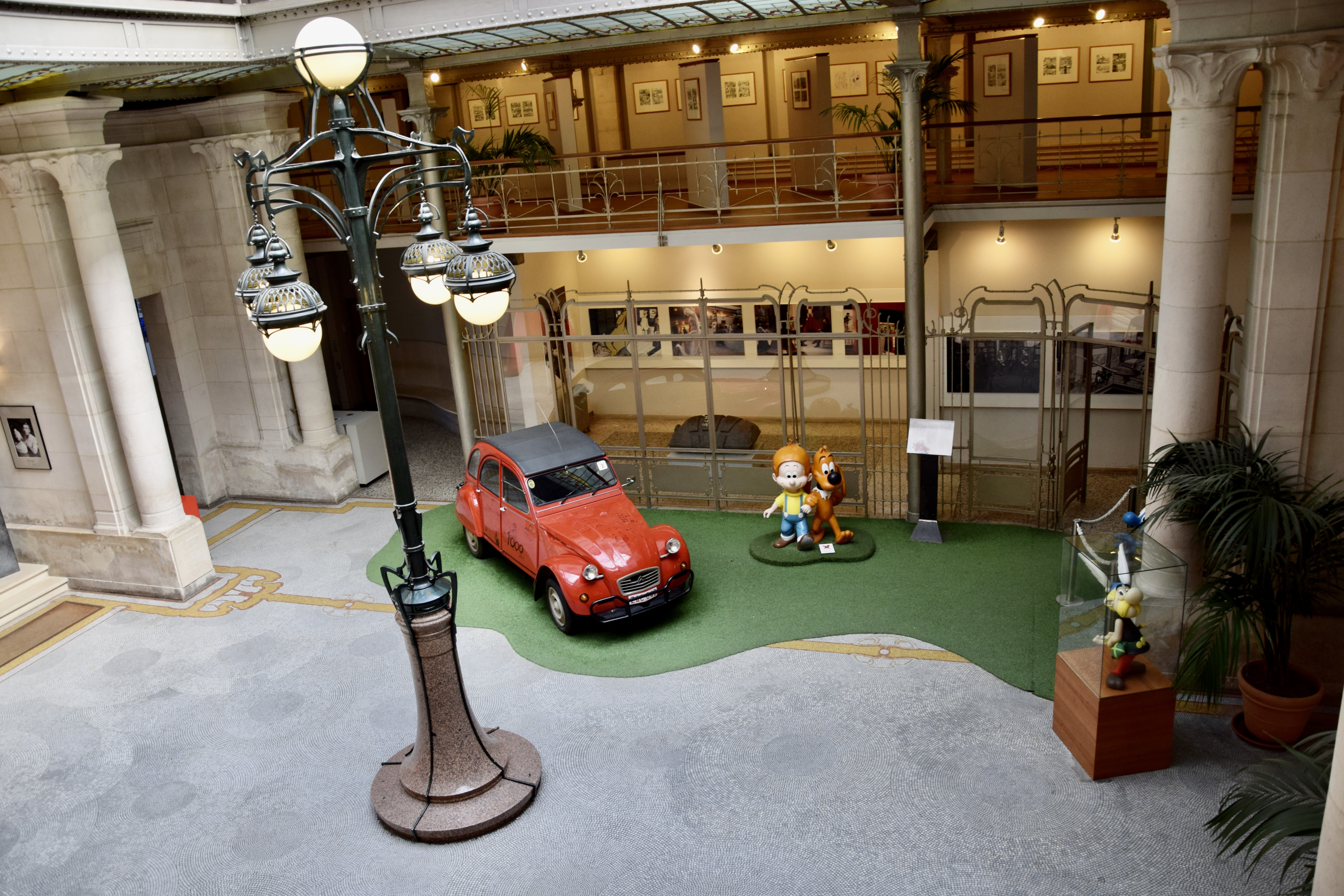
Entrance hall

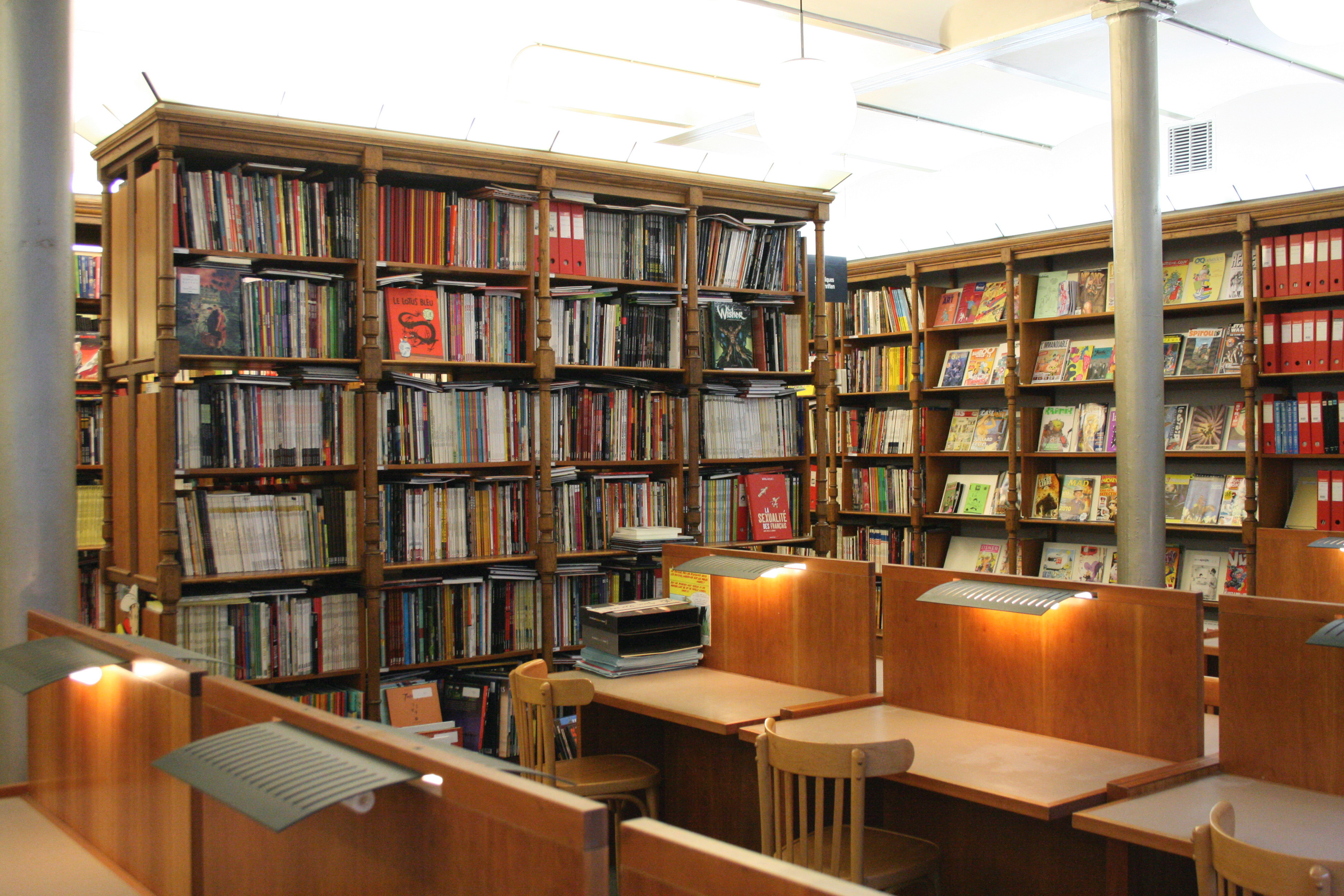
Library

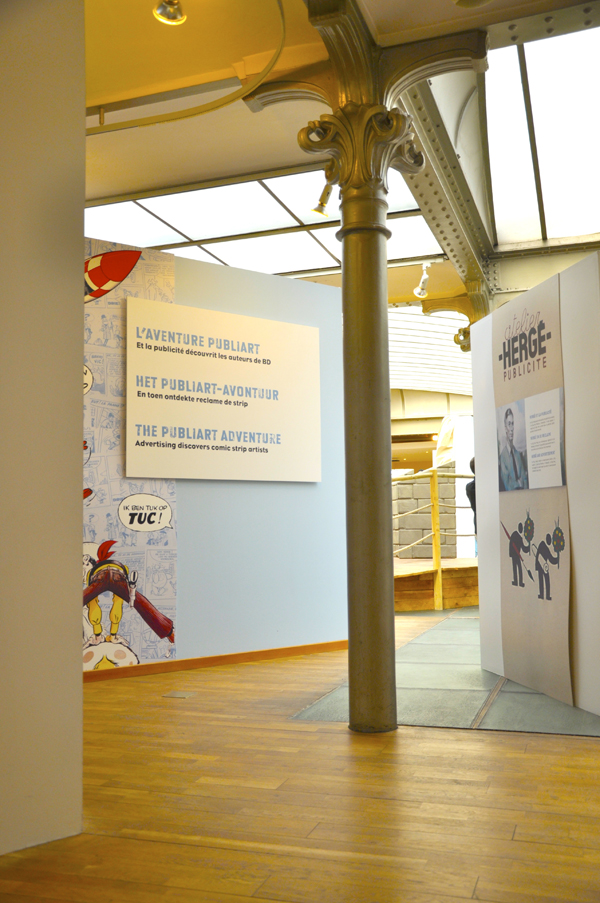
Entrance to the PUBLIART space

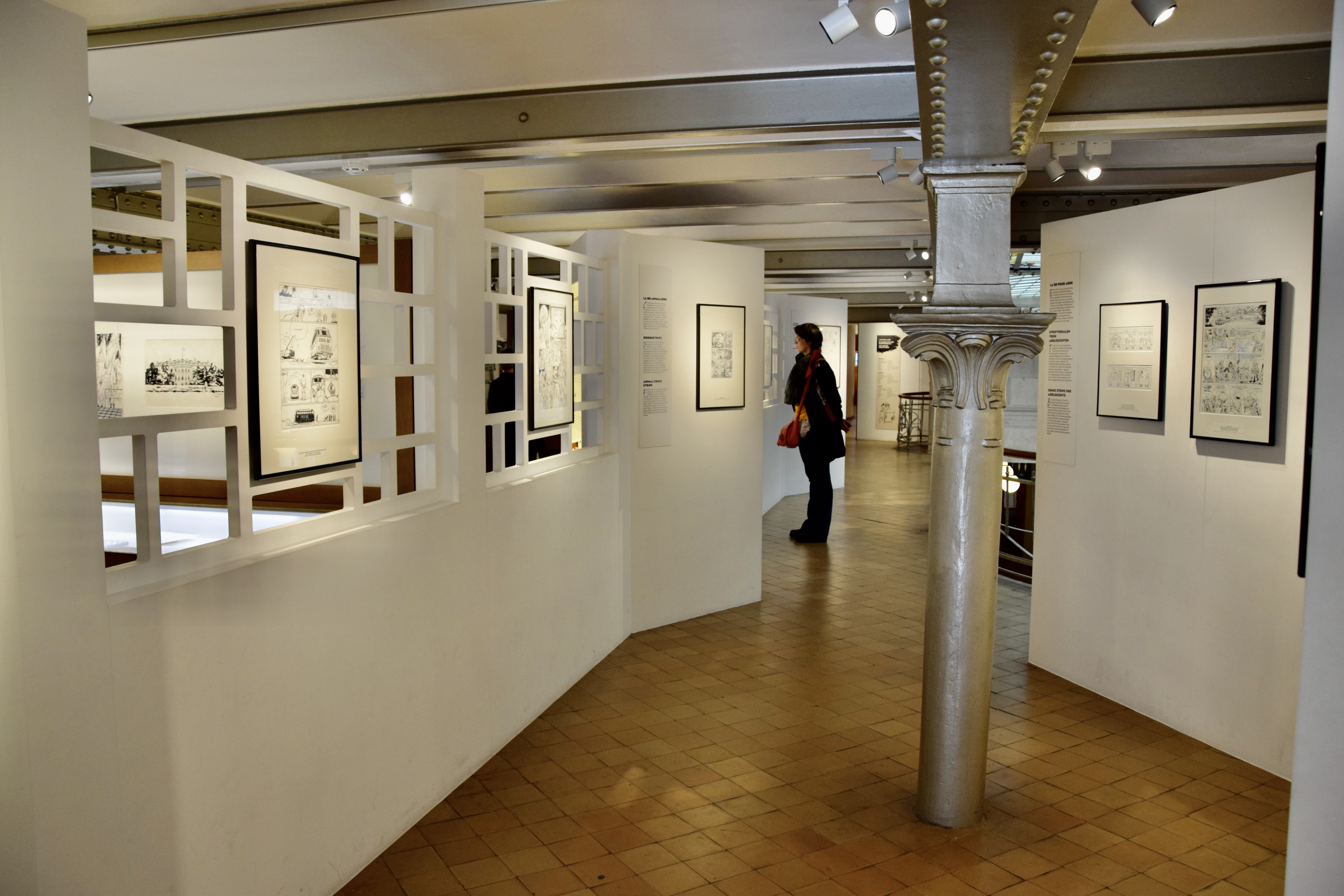
Exhibition space

== List of the exhibited comics artists ==
Four artists exhibited are Flemish: Willy Vandersteen, Marc Sleen, Bob de Moor and Morris. The rest are Walloon or from Brussels, except for Jacques Martin and Tibet who were born in France, but published in Tintin.

- Hergé (The Adventures of Tintin, Quick and Flupke, Jo, Zette and Jocko)
- Jijé (Spirou et Fantasio, Jerry Spring)
- Edgar P. Jacobs (Blake and Mortimer)
- Willy Vandersteen (Suske en Wiske)
- Marc Sleen (The Adventures of Nero)
- Maurice Tillieux (Gil Jourdan)
- Bob De Moor (Cori, de Scheepsjongen)
- André Franquin (Spirou et Fantasio, Marsupilami, Gaston Lagaffe, Franquin's Last Laugh)
- Jacques Martin (The Adventures of Alix)
- Morris (Lucky Luke)
- Paul Cuvelier (Corentin)
- Victor Hubinon (Buck Danny)
- Tibet (Chick Bill, Ric Hochet)
- Raymond Macherot (Chlorophylle, Sybilline)
- Jean Roba (Boule et Bill)
- Peyo (The Smurfs, Johan and Peewit)
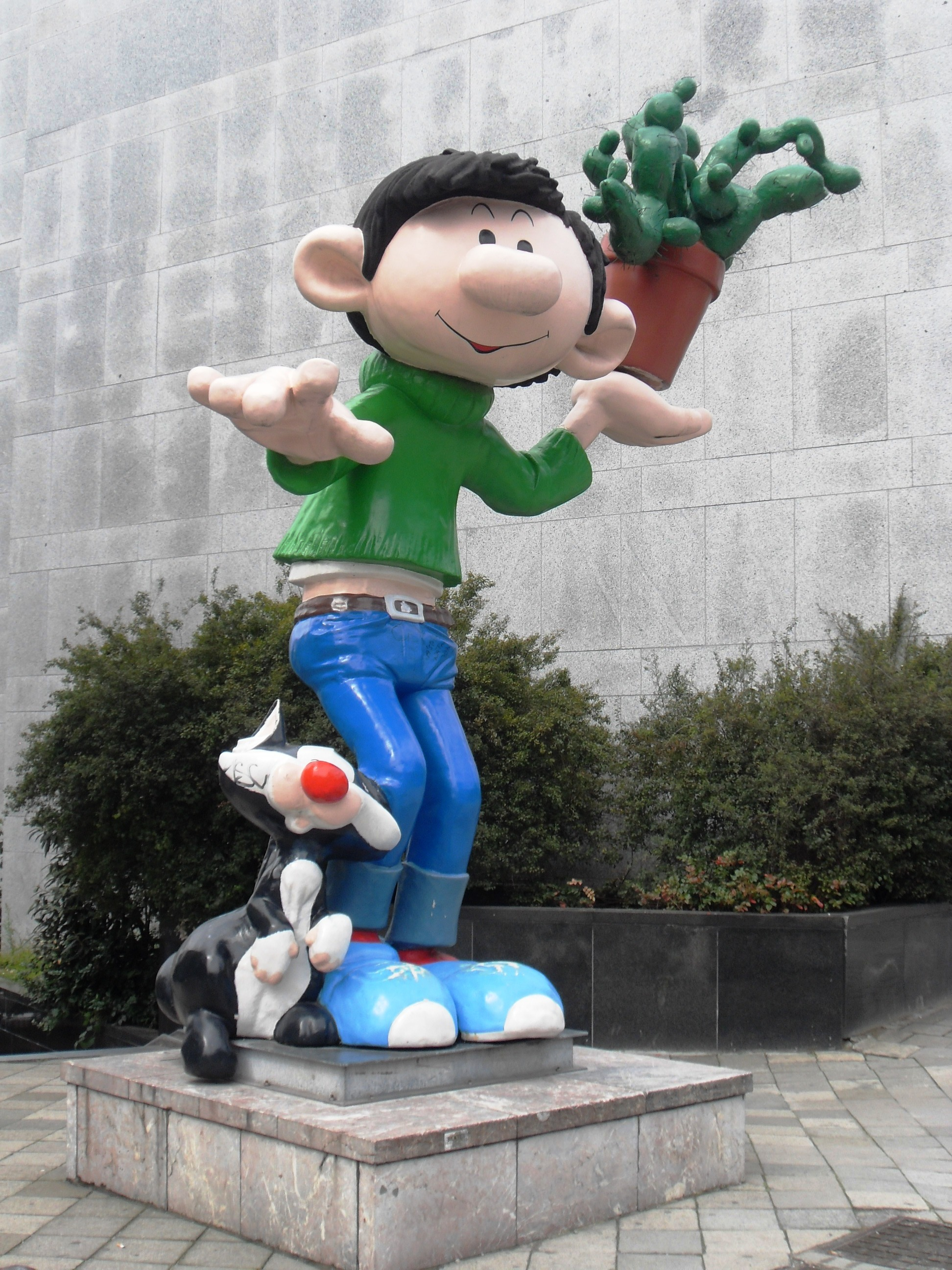
Gaston Lagaffe

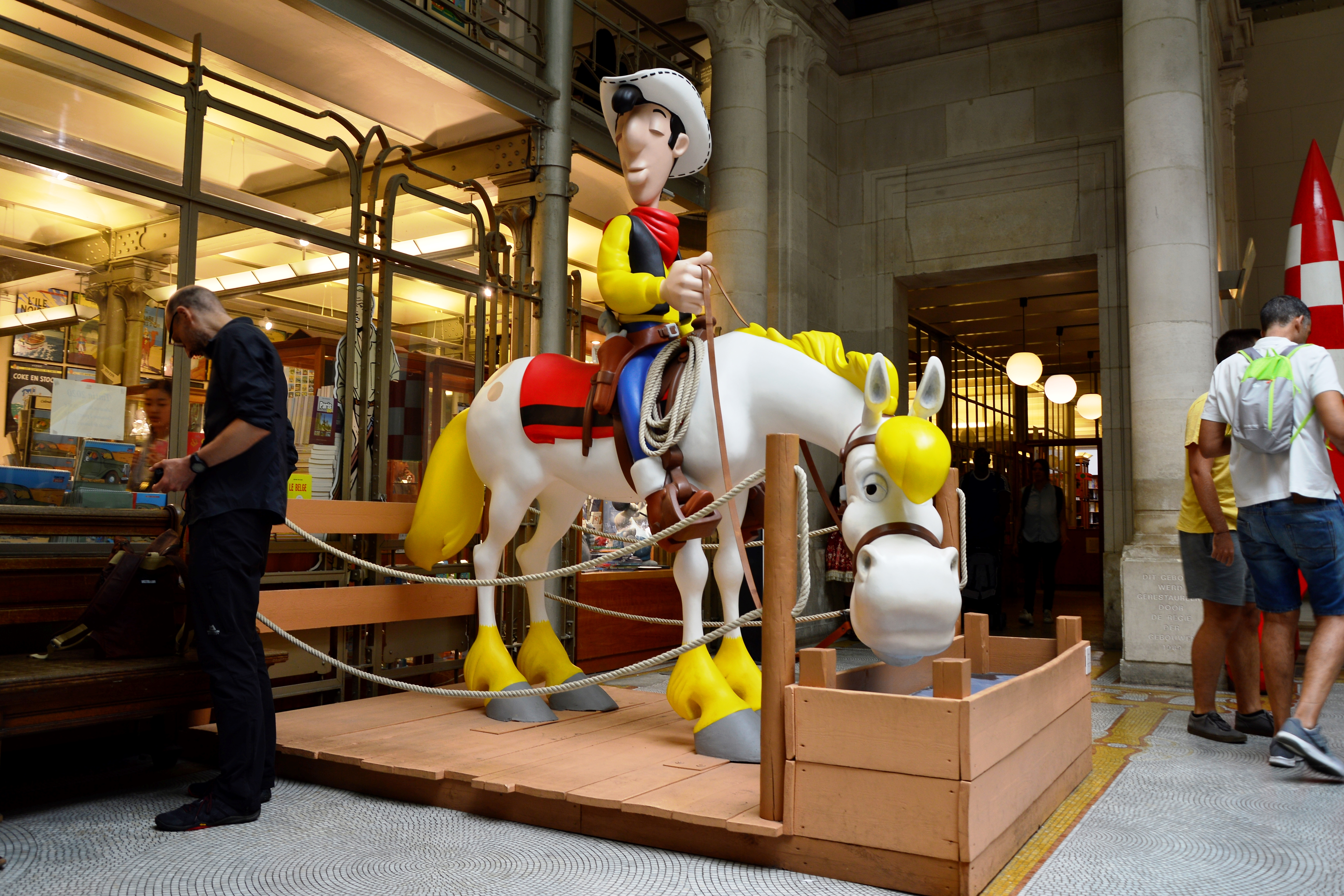
Lucky Luke and Jolly Jumper

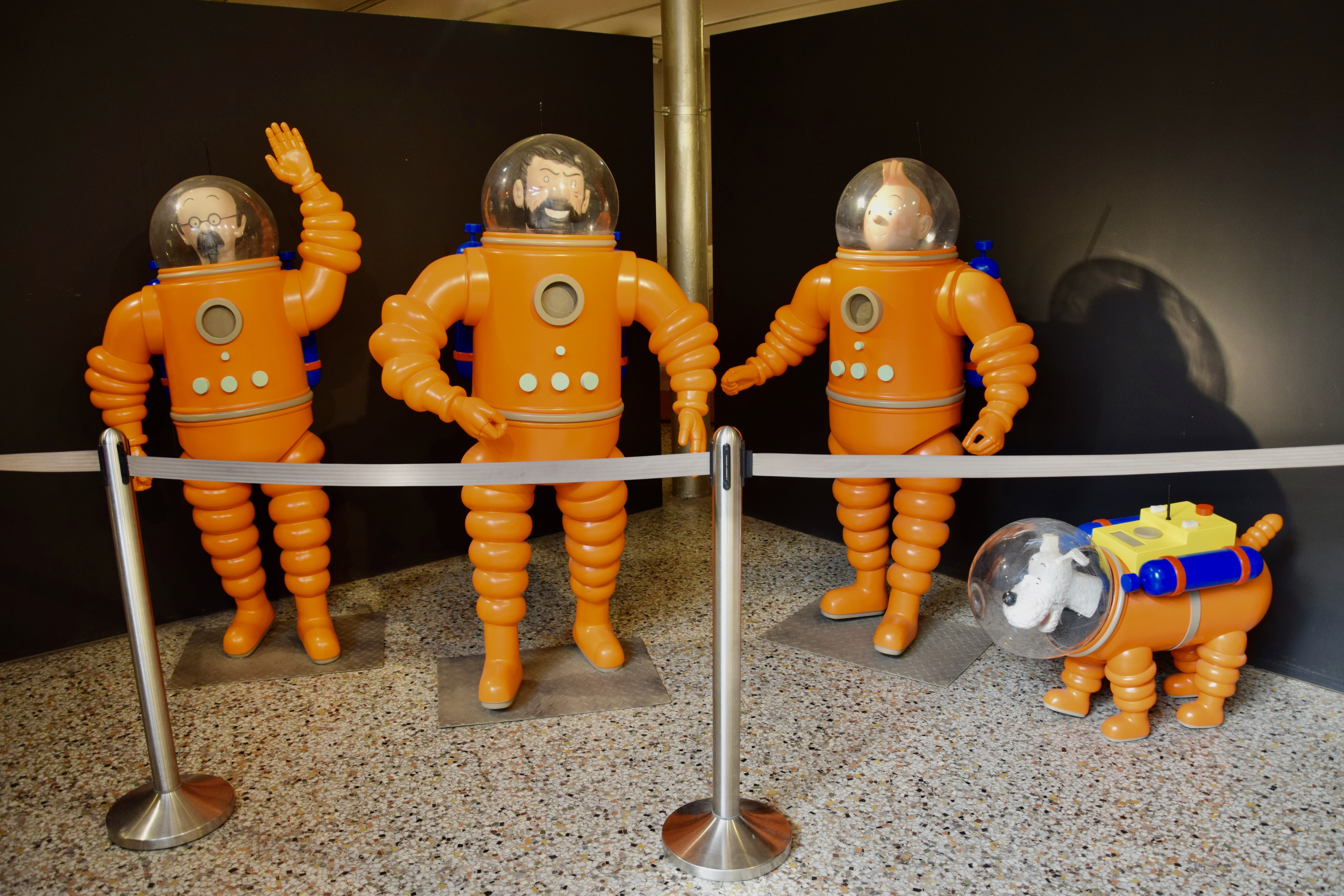
The Adventures of Tintin

== See also ==
- List of museums in Brussels
- Brussels' Comic Book Route
- Art Nouveau in Brussels
- History of Brussels
- Culture of Belgium
- Belgium in the long nineteenth century
