= Vanik =

Vanik may refer to:

- Vanik (fictional character) in The Adventures of Alix
- Charles Vanik (1913-2007), US politician
- Vanik (caste), an Indian social group
