= Cori, de Scheepsjongen =

Belgian comics series by Bob de Moor

Cori, de Scheepsjongen / Cori, le Moussaillon
- Cori, waving his hat from a sailing mast.

Publication information
- Publisher: Lombard Editions; Tintin magazine
- Genre: Historical comics, Nautical comics, Adventure comics.
- Publication date: 1951 –1992
- No. of issues: 5.

Creative team
- Created by: Bob de Moor
- Written by: Bob de Moor
- Artist(s): Bob de Moor, Geert de Sutter, Johan de Moor

Cori, de Scheepsjongen ("Cori, the cabin boy"/ "Cori Le Moussaillon" in French) was a Belgian comics series (1951–1993) by Bob de Moor. It is a historical adventure strip set in the 16th century, drawn in a realistic style with much attention to detail. It is often regarded as De Moor's magnum opus.

== Concept ==
Ever since his youth Bob de Moor was fascinated by ship transport, which echoed back in his later comic strips. An early predecessor of the series was "Bart de Scheepsjongen" (1945) ("Bart the Cabin Boy"), which he drew for "De Kleine Zondagsvriend". In 1950 Lombard Editions approached him to draw a comic series that would appeal to the Flemish and Dutch readers. De Moor created a series set in the 16th century during the background of the Eighty Years' War between the Netherlands and Spain. The orphan child Cori is kidnapped by pirates, but later saved by the Verenigde Oostindische Compagnie. He is adopted by commander Harm Janszoon and joins them as a cabin boy and travels along during their exploration of South-East Asia, Africa, America and the Arctic. He gets involved in sea battles against pirates and the Spanish Armada, among other endeavours. He also meets real-life historical characters Piet Heyn, Pieter van der Does, Joris van Spilbergen, Willem Janszoon and Willem Barents. Later stories are set at the start of the 17th century, despite Cori not aging much.

The first story was serialized in the magazine Tintin between 1951 and 1952. Since most of De Moor's time was taken up by his work for Hergé's studio he was largely unable to find time to draw his own stories until Hergé's death in 1983. De Moor was aided by his assistant Geert de Sutter. When he died, four albums were available. His son Johan de Moor finished the fifth and final story that his father had been working on.

== Albums ==
The entire series counts five albums. Six, if you count "Koers naar het Goud", which was a redrawn and colorized update of the first black-and-white story "Onder De Vlag van de Compagnie" ("Underneath The [East Indies] Company's Flag"). In 1974 this rare and original black-and-white story was made published in limited availability by the comics magazine CISO .

- 1) "De onoverwinnelijke Armada deel 1: de Spionnen van de Koningin" ("The uninvicible Armada part 1: the queen's spies")
- 2) "De onoverwinnelijke Armada deel 2: de Zeedraak" ("The uninvicible Armada part 2: the Sea Dragon")
- 3) "Koers naar het Goud" ("Setting sail to the gold")
- 4) "De Gedoemde Reis" ("The Doomed Voyage")
- 5) "Dali Capitain" ("Dali Capitain")

== Awards ==
The fourth "Cori" story "De Gedoemde Reis" won the Youth Prize at the Comics Festival of Angoulême, France, in 1988.

== In popular culture ==
In the Belgian Comic Strip Center in Brussels the permanent exhibition brings homage to the pioneers of Belgian comics, among them Bob de Moor. In the room dedicated to his work the backgrounds are based on a 16th-century ship, much like in "Cori".

In September 1998, as part of the Brussels' Comic Book Route, a special wall was dedicated to "Cori, de Scheepsjongen" in the Rue des Fabriques / Fabriekstraat in Brussels.
