= The Necklace Affair =

1967 comic book by Edgar P. Jacobs

The Necklace Affair (L'Affaire du Collier)
- Cover of a 1991 edition
- Date: 1967
- Series: Blake and Mortimer

Creative team
- Writers: Edgar P. Jacobs

Original publication
- Language: French

Translation
- Publisher: Cinebook Ltd
- Translator: Jerome Saincantin

Chronology
- Preceded by: The Time Trap
- Followed by: Professor Sató's Three Formulae, Volume 1: Mortimer in Tokyo

The Necklace Affair (English for "L'Affaire du Collier") by the Belgian artist Edgar P. Jacobs was the tenth comic book in the Blake and Mortimer series.

== Plot ==
The necklace of Queen Marie-Antoinette that was believed to have been destroyed centuries ago has been found by Sir Henry Williamson, a wealthy British collector based in France. Blake and Mortimer arrive in Paris in order to testify at the trial of their sworn enemy Colonel Olrik only to learn that he has managed to slip away under the very noses of the police during a transfer to the court house from the main jail.

Williamson then invites them to a reception where he intends to show off the necklace for the first time in public. The party is held at the residence of Duranton-Claret, the jeweller who restored the necklace, but as he is on his way to fetch it a large explosion shakes the house. Going to the cellar, Blake and Mortimer find it in a state of collapse with water pouring in from the burst water main. They barely manage to save the jewel case from the strongroom, but when they open it the necklace is gone and they find a note in which Olrik claims responsibility. The explosion was caused by an actual bomb and Olrik and his men escaped using the Paris Catacombs over which the house rests.

Blake summons his contact Commissaire Pradier of the DST, the French security service (similar to the FBI or MI5) who is in charge of the Olrik case. Olrik himself leaks the news to the press and before long Duranton is harassed by phone calls from reporters and becomes a bundle of nerves.

In the morning, Blake and Mortimer are visiting Duranton when they witness an attempt by Olrik's men, led by his henchman Sharkey, to kidnap him. The two Britons manage to rescue Duranton but the crooks escape. A couple of nights later, Duranton is again the subject of an attempt, this time led by Olrik himself. With the help of Vincent, Duranton's loyal valet, Blake and Mortimer manage to rescue the terrified jeweller, but, in spite of the sudden arrival of the police, Olrik and his men escape, again via the catacombs.

Pradier has arranged a wire-tapping of the phones in the Duranton residence. They thus intercept a call from Olrik to the jeweller in which it emerges that Duranton, facing financial ruin, arranged for the theft of the necklace with Sharkey in return for help in springing Olrik from prison. However, Duranton also double-crossed Olrik by placing a fake necklace in the strongroom - the real item is still somewhere in his house. Olrik tells him that to end the nightmare Duranton is to deliver the real necklace to him at night at Montsouris Park.

That night Duranton recovers the necklace and discreetly leaves his house, his real intention being to flee abroad. Following him from a distance are Blake, Mortimer and Pradier, but Duranton's car is hijacked by Sharkey who was hidden inside. Driving erratically, the terrified Duranton crashes into the park fence. With the police surrounding the area he hides the necklace in a merry-go-round. He then hails a cab only to find it driven by Olrik who promptly drives through a police roadblock.

Blake, Mortimer and Pradier find Sharkey who was knocked unconscious in the crash. He agrees to co-operate and leads them to an entrance to the catacombs. While walking through the tunnels, Sharkey gives the police the slip. Blake and Mortimer go after him but then get hopelessly lost in the underground maze. Sharkey himself manages to make his way to an old underground bunker which was used by the resistance during World War II and is now Olrik's HQ. Duranton is placed in a deep, dry well which is filled bit by bit with water. As it reaches his throat he finally confesses to Olrik where he left the necklace. Olrik leaves him with the fake and sets off to recover the genuine article.

Just as he is leaving, Blake and Mortimer manage to find their way through the maze and reach the bunker. As they take on the guards they are on the verge of being killed when the police led by Pradier arrives. In the battle that follows, the police manage to capture Olrik's gang, including Sharkey, and recover Duranton and the fake necklace.

Olrik himself evades the police by making his way through the sewers. He reaches Montsouris Park and recovers the necklace from the merry-go-round. At that moment he is surrounded by police but manages to escape, again via the sewers.

Driving to a safe-house, Olrik learns on the radio that there will be a special TV broadcast about the recent events. Arriving at his hide-out he switches on the TV: during the programme Mortimer announces that the necklace Olrik obtained from the park is in fact the fake. The police had recovered the genuine article just moments before the crook's arrival. Enraged, Olrik smashes up the fake necklace.

Sir Henry Williamson then announces that he is donating the necklace to the French nation.

== Publication ==
The strip was originally published in Tintin magazine in 1965 before being published in book form in 1967. With S.O.S. Meteors and The Time Trap, it forms the final instalment of a trilogy of adventures that take place in France featuring many of the same characters—Blake, Mortimer and their contact Pradier.

== English publication ==
The first publication in English is by Cinebook Ltd in January 2010.

== Reception ==
The Necklace Affair is generally considered one of Jacobs' weaker "Blake and Mortimer" stories. It is the only "pure" crime story within the Blake and Mortimer series, and it is the only one that doesn't include any science-fiction element.

== See also ==
- The Affair of the Necklace (disambiguation)
