= The Francis Blake Affair =

- Cover of the English language (Cinebook) edition
- Date: 1996
- Series: Blake and Mortimer

Creative team
- Writers: Jean Van Hamme
- Artists: Ted Benoit

Original publication
- Published in: Tintin magazine
- Language: French

Translation
- Publisher: Cinebook Ltd
- Date: September 2008
- Translator: Jerome Saincantin

Chronology
- Preceded by: Professor Sató's Three Formulae, Volume 2: Mortimer vs. Mortimer
- Followed by: The Voronov Plot

The Francis Blake Affair was the thirteenth Blake and Mortimer book and the first one not to be written by Edgar P. Jacobs. It was published in 1996.

== Plot ==
The United Kingdom is shaken by the revelation of the existence of an espionage network in the country. At a meeting at Scotland Yard between intelligence (MI5 and MI6), Scotland Yard and the Home Office, Captain Francis Blake, Director of MI5, explains that whenever its services take a track, spies manage to disappear without a trace. Only a message carrier by name of Jennings was arrested. He then speculates there is a mole within the Intelligence Service. The same night, at the Centaur Club, Blake explains to Professor Philip Mortimer the difficulty of dismantling such a network where are agents unknown even among themselves.

The next day, during the interrogation of Jennings, a photograph of his contact is revealed: to their surprise, it's Captain Blake. The latter escapes with Jennings after a chase on a motorcycle with his former deputy, David Honeychurch. A few hours later, Mortimer is escorted to his apartment which is to be searched by police. Made aware of recent events, he refuses to believe in the betrayal of his friend, even in the face of mounting evidence. He thinks rather that he is in danger and that he must find him to help him. He remembers while the day before, Blake told him about innocuous way of his escape to his cousin Virginia in Yorkshire. After escaping surveillance by the police, he travels, with the help of a wanderer, to the North of England in a freight train to avoid police checks. He then travels to Seanberry by bike where Virginia already seems to know him and waits for him.

Meanwhile, Blake and Jennings arrive in London via a postal van. Entering a home in the English countryside, Blake faces his old enemy Colonel Olrik and his man, Jack, killing Jennings. Olrik is not convinced by the betrayal of Blake, and to test it, he orders him to kill Fielding, an agent of MI5 in captivity. Blake does not, and manages to knock out Olrik and Jack at the end of a struggle during which Fielding is seriously injured. In order to escape, he triggers a fire, which forces Olrik and his men to hurriedly leave the residence before firefighters arrive.

In Seanberry, Virginia reveals to Mortimer that she is a sleeper agent (aka 'cousin') in the service of Blake and that the betrayal of the latter is just a covert operation to infiltrate the spy network. But in the early morning, things get complicated when the Home Secretary, the only person of significance knowing of the operation, is the victim of a car "accident". In addition, the Chief Inspector Glenn Kendall finds Mortimer and stops him. About to be arrested, the Professor jumps into the convertible with Virginia who manages to lose his pursuers. She takes Mortimer to a farm where he exchanges his clothes with a man like him to deal with the police. In London, Honeychurch – who turns out also to be part of the operation – is caught red-handed by the Under-Secretary of State for the Home Office, Harold Doyle-Smith, in person.

Mortimer is driven to Scotland where he finds Blake in a cromlech. He then discovers they are right next to Ardmuir Castle where is a scientific seminar. Blake tells him that Olrik's plan is to kidnap the brightest physicists of the Kingdom and make them work on behalf of a foreign power. The thug then appears with his men and the two friends split up to evade them. Mortimer, surrounded, jumps into the water from the top of a cliff, while Blake gets in a car, of which the occupant turns out be the Under-Secretary of State Harold Doyle-Smith. Blake then reveals to him his secret operation and, arriving at the Castle, Doyle-Smith gives him the benefit of the doubt. When Blake sees the six fingered hand of industrialist Adrian Deloraine, he recalls Fielding's warning and understands that the Under-Secretary of State is the Mole. Without being able to react, he finds himself locked in a dungeon with his deputy Honeychurch.

During this time, Mortimer, who everyone thinks is dead, is stuck on a ledge of the cliff. He follows an underpass taking him to a secret submarine base located under the Castle. Quietly, he releases Blake and Honeychurch. While the latter warns the SAS, Blake and Mortimer sabotage the generator base and then, at the end of a struggle between Mortimer and Olrik, the propeller and rudder of the submarine. A firefight rages between the two sides until the SAS invade the Castle and the base. Everyone is arrested except Olrik, who manages to escape by sea plane. Blake and Mortimer are awarded from the hands of the Home Secretary the Victoria Cross for service rendered to their homeland.

== English publication ==
The first publication in English was by Cinebook Ltd in September 2008.
