= The Mystery of the Great Pyramid, Volume 2: The Chamber of Horus =

The Mystery of the Great Pyramid, Volume 2: The Chamber of Horus (Le Mystère de la Grande Pyramide, Tome 2)
- French Cover
- Series: Blake and Mortimer

Original publication
- Published in: Tintin magazine
- Language: French

Translation
- Publisher: Les Editions Blake et Mortimer, Cinebooks
- Date: 1987, 2008

Chronology
- Preceded by: The Mystery of the Great Pyramid, Volume 1: Manetho's Papyrus
- Followed by: The Yellow "M"

The Mystery of the Great Pyramid, Volume 2: The Chamber of Horus (French: Le Mystère de la Grande Pyramide, Tome 2) by the Belgian artist Edgar P. Jacobs was the fifth comic book in the Blake and Mortimer series, first published in Tintin magazine. It first appeared in book format in 1955, then was reprinted in a single-volume edition with Part 1 in 2011 (ISBN 9782870971697).

== Synopsis ==
Captain Blake having been assassinated at Athens Airport, Olrik seems to have won the first round. A furious Mortimer swears that he'll never stop trying to avenge his friend. He goes on the hunt, but information is scarce. Sheik Abdel Razek, an old man with mysterious powers, protects him against Doctor Grossgrabenstein's foreman. The doctor is a devoted Egyptologist who has undertaken excavations not far from the Great Pyramid. Strange happenings occur and Mortimer may sometimes feel like he's losing his way in this investigation that will lead him into the darkest depths of the Great Pyramid.

== Plot ==
At the beginning of Volume 2, Mortimer understands Großgrabenstein is in danger and goes one evening to his villa. He discovers Olrik and Großgrabenstein are one and the same person before being captured and taken to the basement of the villa alongside Nasir, who has been kidnapped. That's when Kamal and his men launch an assault on the villa. Olrik, in the guise of Großgrabenstein abandons his men while Mortimer and Nasir are saved from execution by Blake, dressed as Egyptian worker. Indeed, feeling followed, he had donned a bulletproof vest and pretended to be killed in order to continue its investigation incognito in Cairo. After these explanations, the villa is taken by the police: Mustapha, one of the men of Olrik, is killed and Jack is wounded and captured by Razul and Sharkey. One then finds the real Großgrabenstein sequestered for several days in his sarcophagus and everyone is taken to the police. Everyone except Blake and Mortimer who decided to go to the site where the German Egyptologist was digging. Following Olrik, they find the road which was built for his men who infiltrated the site and eventually succeed, after many adventures, in finding the House of Horus.

Meanwhile, Nasir, worried for his masters, goes to Sheikh Abdel Razek who travels from his home by a secret passage to the chamber of Horus. After destroying the spirit Olrik by his magical powers, he explains everything to them: the return of the cult of Amun came after Akhenaten's death (which established the monotheistic worship of Aten) the faithful cult that were Mérira and Paatenemheb decided to take the mummy of Akhenaten, his treasure and that of Aten, who were in danger, to safety. One night, in secret, they carried everything in the room and Paatenemheb was appointed as Initiated and responsible for maintaining secrecy until the return of this cult. A worthy descendant of that Paatenemheb, Razek saved the treasure from Olrik and erases some of the memories of Blake and Mortimer. The two friends, coming out of the Great Pyramid, then celebrate their victory against traffickers in antiquities. They believe first of all not having found the Horus room but only had an extraordinary dream, until Mortimer sees a ring on his finger as he told the sheik before partial memory loss. After a last look at the Great Pyramid of Cheops, on which stands Abdel Razek, the two heroes leave the Giza Plateau under the gaze of the sheikh. In the distance, Olrik become insane and wanders off into the desert.

== Translations ==
=== English ===
The Mystery of the Great Pyramid, Vol. 2 was first published in English by Les Editions Blake and Mortimer in 1987.(ISBN 9782870971697) Comcat Comics planned to publish a translation in 1990 called Secret of the Great Pyramid, Vol 2, but the company went bankrupt before it could come out. Cinebook Ltd published a translation in January 2008 (ISBN 9781905460380).
