= Necklace (disambiguation) =

A necklace is an article of jewelry worn around the neck.

Necklace may also refer to:

- Necklace (combinatorics) or fixed necklace, a concept in combinatorial mathematics
- "The Necklace", a short story by Guy de Maupassant
- "The Necklace" (Dynasty), a 1981 episode of the TV series Dynasty
- Necklace (horse), foaled 2001
- The Necklace (album), a 2024 album by Allday

== See also ==
- Necklace of Harmonia, a fabled object in Greek mythology
- Necklace splitting problem, another application in combinatorics
- The Affair of the Necklace (disambiguation)
- Antoine's necklace, in topology
- Necklacing, a form of execution
- Necklace Nebula, nebula located in the constellation Sagitta
