= The Queen's Necklace (disambiguation) =

The Queen's Necklace is an 1850 novel by Alexandre Dumas

The Queen's Necklace may also refer to:

- The Queen's Necklace (1909 film) a French short film adaptation of the 1850 novel
- The Queen's Necklace (1929 film), a 1929 French historical drama film
- The Queen's Necklace (1946 film), a 1946 French historical drama film
- The Queen's Necklace, a fantasy novel by Teresa Edgerton
- "The Queen's Necklace", one of the stories in the collection Arsène Lupin, Gentleman Burglar by Maurice Leblanc
- The Queen's Necklace: A Swedish Folktale, a children's book by Helena Nyblom
- The Queen's Necklace, a novel by Antal Szerb
- Queen's Necklace (game), a board game by Bruno Faidutti and Bruno Cathala
- a popular name for Marine Drive, Mumbai

== See also ==
- The Affair of the Necklace (disambiguation)
