= Jacques Martin (comics) =

French comics artist

- Jacques Martin in 1995
- Born: 25 September 1921 Strasbourg, France
- Died: 21 January 2010 (aged 88) Orbe, Switzerland
- Areas: Cartoonist, Writer, Penciller
- Pseudonyms: Jam, Marleb
- Notable works: Alix; Lefranc; Jhen
- Awards: full list

Jacques Martin (French pronunciation: [ʒak maʁtɛ̃]; 25 September 1921 – 21 January 2010) was a French comics artist and comic book creator. He was one of the classic artists of Tintin magazine, alongside Edgar P. Jacobs and Hergé, of whom he was a longtime collaborator. He is best known for his series Alix. He was born in Strasbourg.

== Biography ==
After pursuing engineering studies as a young man, Jacques Martin began in 1942 to draw his first comic stories. In 1946, following the end of the War, he travelled through Belgium in search of an editor for his work. Soon afterwards he met Georges Remi (aka Hergé) with whom he collaborated on several albums of The Adventures of Tintin (and more specifically on Tintin in Tibet and The Red Sea Sharks) while working on his own albums. It was from Hergé that he learned of the ligne claire style and, under Hergé's guidance, began to use it in his own work. He would later be considered one of the great five of the ligne claire style, along with Hergé, Edgar P. Jacobs, Bob de Moor and Willy Vandersteen.

In 1948, he created Alix, his most famous series, published in the magazine Tintin, whose adventures - extremely well researched - occur in Roman antiquity. This historic comic soon became one of the most popular of the genre and went on to be published in several countries worldwide.

The story Le spectre de Carthage won the award for best French realistic comic book at the 1978 Angoulême International Comics Festival.

Martin went on to create other characters, beginning with the contemporary journalist Lefranc in 1952. Much later he created others in collaboration with various partners, namely the medieval architect Jhen (initially entitled Xan) in 1978, the French revolutionary officer Arno in 1984, the Athenian Orion in 1990, and the Egyptian Keos in 1992. In 2003, he also started a new series - Loïs set in the court of Louis the sun king of France.

In 1998, due to failing eyesight, Martin left the drawing of Alix to Rafael Morales. Alix continues running with great success. Martin died on 21 January 2010.

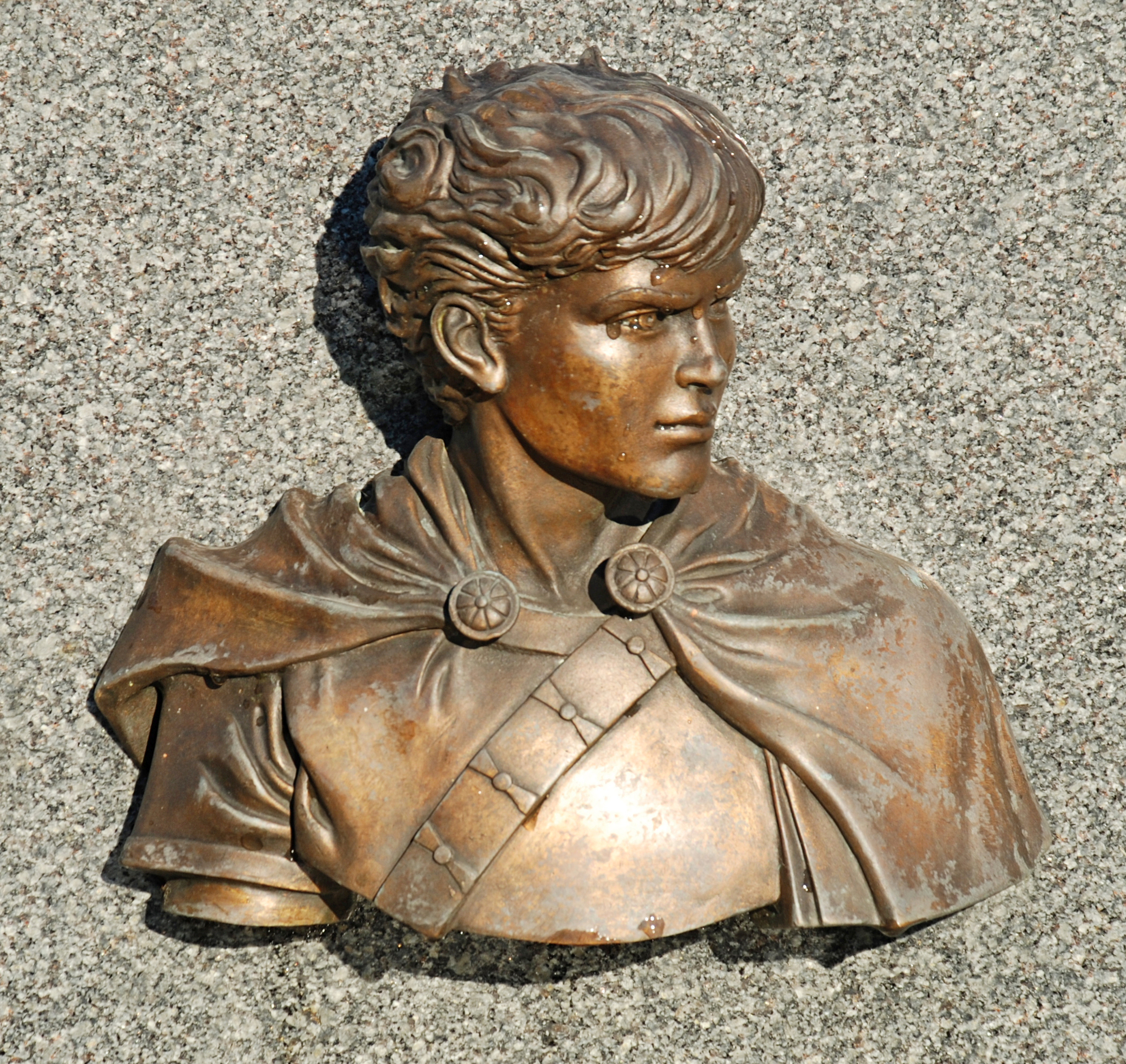
Bust of Alix on the tomb of Jacques Martin in Céroux (Ottignies-Louvain-la-Neuve, Belgium)

== Awards ==
- 1978: Angoulême Best French Realistic Work, for Alix: Le spectre de Carthage
- 2003: Prix Saint-Michel Grand Prix
