= Professor Sató's Three Formulae, Volume 2: Mortimer vs. Mortimer =

Professor Sató's 3 Formulae, Volume 2: Mortimer vs. Mortimer (Les Trois Formules du professeur Satō)
- Cover to the French-language edition
- Date: 1990
- Series: Blake and Mortimer

Creative team
- Writers: Edgar P. Jacobs
- Artists: Bob de Moor

Original publication
- Language: French

Chronology
- Preceded by: Professor Sató's Three Formulae, Volume 1: Mortimer in Tokyo
- Followed by: The Francis Blake Affair

Professor Sató's 3 Formulae, Volume 2: Mortimer vs. Mortimer was the twelfth book in the Blake and Mortimer series. It was started by Edgar P. Jacobs but after his death, completed by Bob de Moor, and was finally published in 1990.

== Plot ==
Captain Blake arrives in Tokyo, and begins to ask questions about the sudden disappearance of Mortimer. Quickly, he discovers that his hotel suite is full of microphones, and seeking to call the police, he comes face-to-face with his supervisors who take escape. Forced to follow them to their car, he manages to escape them thanks to his audacity. Intrigued by the whole affair, he warns Hasumi, the Tokyo Police Commissioner, and his friend Colonel Mitsu, Japanese secret services. At the villa, Professor Satō surprises his assistant by creating a second android in the image of Mortimer who must go kill Blake. Partially regaining control of his laboratory, he helps Mortimer to escape and the latter heads to the Japanese capital to save his friend. At his hotel, Blake is under attack by Mortimer's double robot who quickly takes over. At the point where it is about to launch the captain from the top of the hotel, Mortimer tumbles out and stops it. A struggle begins between the two Mortimer and as the robot takes off into the air, they are both struck by lightning.

The next day, Mortimer wakes up in the hospital and tells the whole story to his doctor. The latter believes he is delirious, he knocks him out and steals an ambulance to reach the villa of Satō as soon as possible and prevent Olrik escaping with the three formulas. At the headquarters of the police, Colonel Mitsu, to whom Mortimer's words have been reported, begins to understand the whole affair. He launches a general alert to storm the villa of Satō, and joins Blake by helicopter. At the villa, Mortimer gets there just before Olrik leaves but he is unable to stop him, attacked by his double robot. While the police arrive in turn, Kim looses on the police a flood of unfinished androids to distract them time while Olrik, Sharkey and himself join on the pier below. Blake and Mitsu get ahead of them, cutting their retreat. When Olrik threatens to blow up the villa Sharkey has mined, with Mortimer and Satō inside, the two agents have no other choice than to let them escape with their helicopter. Inside the villa, Mortimer and Satō take refuge inside the robot Samurai, which allows them to survive the explosion triggered by Olrik and find Blake and Mitsu. Satō gives a last order to his faithful robot: destroy the helicopter as a true "kamikaze". The Samurai catches up with the helicopter and destroys it with its occupants on board, just like the submarine waiting for them. The briefcase containing the three formulas of Professor Satō is recovered among the debris, and the four friends celebrate their victory.
