= Professor Sató's Three Formulae, Volume 1: Mortimer in Tokyo =

Professor Sató's 3 Formulae, Volume 1: Mortimer in Tokyo (Les Trois Formules du professeur Satō)
- Cover to the French-language edition
- Series: Blake and Mortimer

Original publication
- Published in: Tintin magazine
- Language: French

Chronology
- Preceded by: The Necklace Affair
- Followed by: Professor Sató's Three Formulae, Volume 2: Mortimer vs. Mortimer

Professor Sató's 3 Formulae, Volume 1: Mortimer in Tokyo is the eleventh book in the Blake and Mortimer series. It was written and drawn by Edgar P. Jacobs and was the last book of the series to be drawn by him.

== Plot ==
At the international airport of Tokyo-Haneda, a 'spot' appear on air traffic controllers radar. The UFO (UFO) threatening air traffic, two aerial fighter planes take off to intercept him. They are then faced with a gigantic Ryū, the legendary Japanese dragon, and one of the pilots was just the time to inform its base until both are destroyed. While the news is spreading in the Japan, the Professor Akira Satō, specialist of cybernetics and robots, wondered about the upheavals that have animated his flying creature. Before revealing his involvement in this incident, he decides, against the advice of his assistant Kim to consult his friend Professor Philip Mortimer, currently the Japan. But his intentions are immediately reported to one mysterious submarine where controls none other than colonel Olrik.

That same evening, leaving a show of kabuki in Kyoto, Mortimer is assaulted by a group of gunmen who take him to an alley. He manages to escape them and join his hotel, where he receives the message from the Pr. Satō asking him to come urgently to Tokyo. No train not leaving until the next day, Mortimer accepts the proposal of a leader of the Mainichi Daily News to take advantage of its business jet to reach the capital. When shipping, Mortimer recognizes the man who assaulted him at the theatre leaving the tarmac, which brings him to beware of the occupants of the plane and feint lose knowledge after having drunk sake. As the men prepare to throw overboard, Professor catches them in defending themselves and a struggle agrees with to end the plane crash. Only survivor, Mortimer manages finally to reach Tokyo by bus and then by train. Arrivé hotel New Ōtani, Mortimer is greeted by Kim, the assistant to the Pr. Satō, who take him to his master's villa overlooking the Bay of Sagami near Miura. SATO announces to Mortimer that he managed to create autonomous flying androids, such the Ryū seen at the airport and Ozu, a Dead Ringer for the cybernetician. He explains he also doubts that the dragon accidentally escaped his laboratory and suspects his assistant Kim was behind that event. By security, he gives him power of attorney to access the three banks where he put away the results of his research: three formulas. Meanwhile, Mortimer is advised to appeal to his friend Captain Francis Blake of MI5, which is located in Hong Kong. But Kim, who has spied on their conversation, reports to Olrik, who decides to intervene immediately.

The next day, Pr. Satō asks Mortimer to visit him at his villa. Once there, Mortimer is immobilized by Satō, who turns out be its dual robot. He is then neutralized by the Samurai robot controlled by Kim and Olrik. In a few days, the assistant manages to create an Android in the image of Mortimer to retrieve the three formulas of Satō. Olrik explained to Mortimer that he is part of the 'group Scorpio"which attempts to capture the Pr. Satō's research. The operation works perfectly for the first two banks but the robot has a major breakdown before the third. Olrik must wait for Kim to fix it but will have to deal with Captain Blake, who just arrived at the Japan.
