= Atlantis Mystery =

Comic book by Edgar P. Jacobs

Atlantis Mystery (l'Enigme de l'Atlantide)
- Cover of the English language (Comcat) edition
- Series: Blake and Mortimer

Original publication
- Published in: Tintin magazine
- Date of publication: March 30, 1955, to May 30, 1956
- Language: French

Translation
- Publisher: Comcat Comics, Cinebooks, Ltd
- Date: 1990, 2012
- Translator: Dwight Decker

Chronology
- Preceded by: The Yellow "M"
- Followed by: S.O.S. Meteors: Mortimer in Paris

Atlantis Mystery (l'Énigme de l'Atlantide) by the Belgian artist Edgar P. Jacobs was the seventh comic book in the Blake and Mortimer series, first published in Tintin magazine from March 30, 1955, to May 30, 1956. It appeared in book format in 1957.

== Plot ==
During a speleological expedition deep in the caves of the Azores, Blake and Mortimer are cut off by their old enemy Olrik, trapping them in a gaseous cavern. Surviving the odds, they are captured by a race of technologically advanced men, who claim to be descendants of survivors from Atlantis. Then, immersed in a sinister plot led by Commander Magon to topple the wise Basileus and lead modern Atlantis in conquest of the surface world, they ally themselves with Crown Prince Ikaros to thwart Magon's megalomaniac plans. But the outcome is far from certain.

Professor Philip Mortimer takes his vacation to São Miguel, an island of the Azores, to do a little speleology. While exploring a hole called by locals "O furo do Diabo", he finds a radioactive rock and cannot help making a rapprochement with the orichalcum mentioned by Plato, the mysterious metal of Atlantis, this legendary civilization so-called swallowed up by the waves. He then called to Captain Francis Blake to further exploration of this cave with him. But the two friends quickly discover that they are not the only ones interested in this case. Indeed, a foreign power, having intercepted the letter from Mortimer to the address of Blake, is interested by this potential source of nuclear energy and Olrik hired to retrieve the rock. He disguises himself as a native of the country and managed to accompany Blake and Mortimer in their exploration. Although Olrik is unable to retrieve the orichalcum, he managed to condemn Blake and Mortimer to stay trapped in the cave. Driven out by sulphurous fumes, the two friends have choice to go further in a tunnel, hoping to find another way out. After having escaped death repeatedly, they discover a wealth of orichalcum and eventually vanish, irradiated.

When they wake up, not only are they perfectly healed but, they left the cave, finding himself in a futuristic world. They are taken to the head of the place which is called Basileus. It condemns them to stay until the end of their days in this place. Blake and Mortimer are placed under the protection of a certain prince Icare who explain the situation: they are in Atlantis. Indeed, 12,000 years ago, Atlantis ruled the world from an island in the middle of the Atlantic. But the collision between Earth and a huge celestial body caused the immersion of the continental coasts and island. The few survivors of the Atlantean civilization then decided to build a new and secret Atlantis in the bowels of the Earth. Since then, the Atlanteans, much more evolved than the inhabitants of the surface thanks to the immense energy source that constitutes the orichalcum, watching the surface of the Earth thanks to what earthlings call flying saucers.

So that Blake and Mortimer are starting their new lives in Poseidopolis, capital of Atlantis, they are victims of murder attempts. He then appears to Icarus that Atlantis is threatened with a serious danger. To confirm his suspicions, he went secretly, accompanied by two earthlings, to the great gate that separates the Atlantis of the Kingdom to the barbarians. These are the descendants of wild peoples who lived on Atlantis and Atlantis were greeted in their underground area, now rejected in a territory behind the Great Gate as a result of attempts to revolt.

The three men have reason to be wary as Magon, the phulacontarque, is the head of a conspiracy which, with the help of the barbarians, intends to overthrow the Basileus and invade the Earth's surface. Having got wind of the departure of Icarus and fearing the discovery of its projects, mago tries to destroy the shipment, but Blake, Mortimer and Icarus to survive. They arrive finally at the Gong sacred, above the great gate and tower which was once used to prevent Poseidopolis of a barbaric attack. That's when Magon and an escort of conspirators through this place to visit Tlalak, the King of the barbarians. The latter is recommended by Olrik, who, having suffered a fall in the cave, found himself at the Court of the King, seeing in this post to advise an opportunity to take revenge on men. But while Magon and Tlalak to discuss the terms of their alliance, Blake, Mortimer and Icarus appear, who took the identity of members of the guard of Magon in the sacred Gong. The three friends fled and split: Blake tries to warn Poseidopolis directly while Mortimer and Icarus take the low road. At the inland sea, Blake steals a boat to reach the capital, but, caught in a typhoon, it is brought back to its starting point where he is captured by the conspirators. Meanwhile, Mortimer and Icarus hide themselves in the ceremonial start of the barbarians with the help of Kisin, a barbarian acquired their cause wanting to avenge the death of his brother caused by Olrik. They reach the sacred Gong where they find Blake that there was held prisoner, and Mortimer manages to ring the gong.

The three friends fly to Poseidopolis aircraft, but the attack has already been launched. When they reach the capital, the city is already half invaded by the barbarians thanks to sabotage of weapons of the Atlanteans by the conspirators. At the Palace, Magon finally unveils his coup in the Basileus as the King Tlalak and Olrik, followed by a horde of barbarians, enter the command room. All seems lost for the Basileus, when Blake, Mortimer and Icarus arise, having managed to reach the Palace through a secret passage. In attempting to exterminate these spoilsport, Olrik accidentally triggers the opening of the floodgates that held the ocean: Atlantis is lost. The Basileus decides to engage the large evacuation planned for a very long: the departure of the Atlanteans to another planet with an armada of spaceships. While Atlantis prepares to join other skies, barbarians, Tlalak, Magon and Olrik are facing the rising waters, and Blake and Mortimer are released and evacuated by a submarine remotely piloted by Icarus. Back on land, in the caldera of Sete Cidades, they attend the majestic departure of Atlantean ships.

== English publication ==
Atlantis Mystery was published in English in 1990 by Comcat Comics. It was translated by Dwight Decker, and edited by Bernd Metz and Jean-Jacques Surbeck.

It was later re-issued by Cinebook Ltd in January 2012.

== Adaption ==
It was adapted for television for the Blake and Mortimer TV series in 1997.
