= The Adventures of Alix =

Comics series by Jacques Martin

- The cover of the first book

Publication information
- Publisher: Tintin magazine, Lombard, Casterman
- Publication date: 1948–
- Main character(s): Alix; Enak

Creative team
- Created by: Jacques Martin
- Written by: Jacques Martin, François Maingoval, Patrick Weber
- Artist(s): Jacques Martin, Rafael Moralès, Marc Henniquiau, Cédric Hervan, Christophe Simon, Ferry

Alix, or The Adventures of Alix, is a Franco-Belgian comics series drawn in the ligne claire style by Jacques Martin. The stories revolve around a young Gallo-Roman man named Alix in the late Roman Republic. Although the series is renowned for its historical accuracy and stunning set detail, the hero has been known to wander into anachronistic situations up to two centuries out of his era. The stories unfold throughout the reaches of the Roman world, including the city of Rome, Gaul, the German frontier, Mesopotamia, Africa and Asia Minor. One voyage goes as far as China.

== Characters and story ==
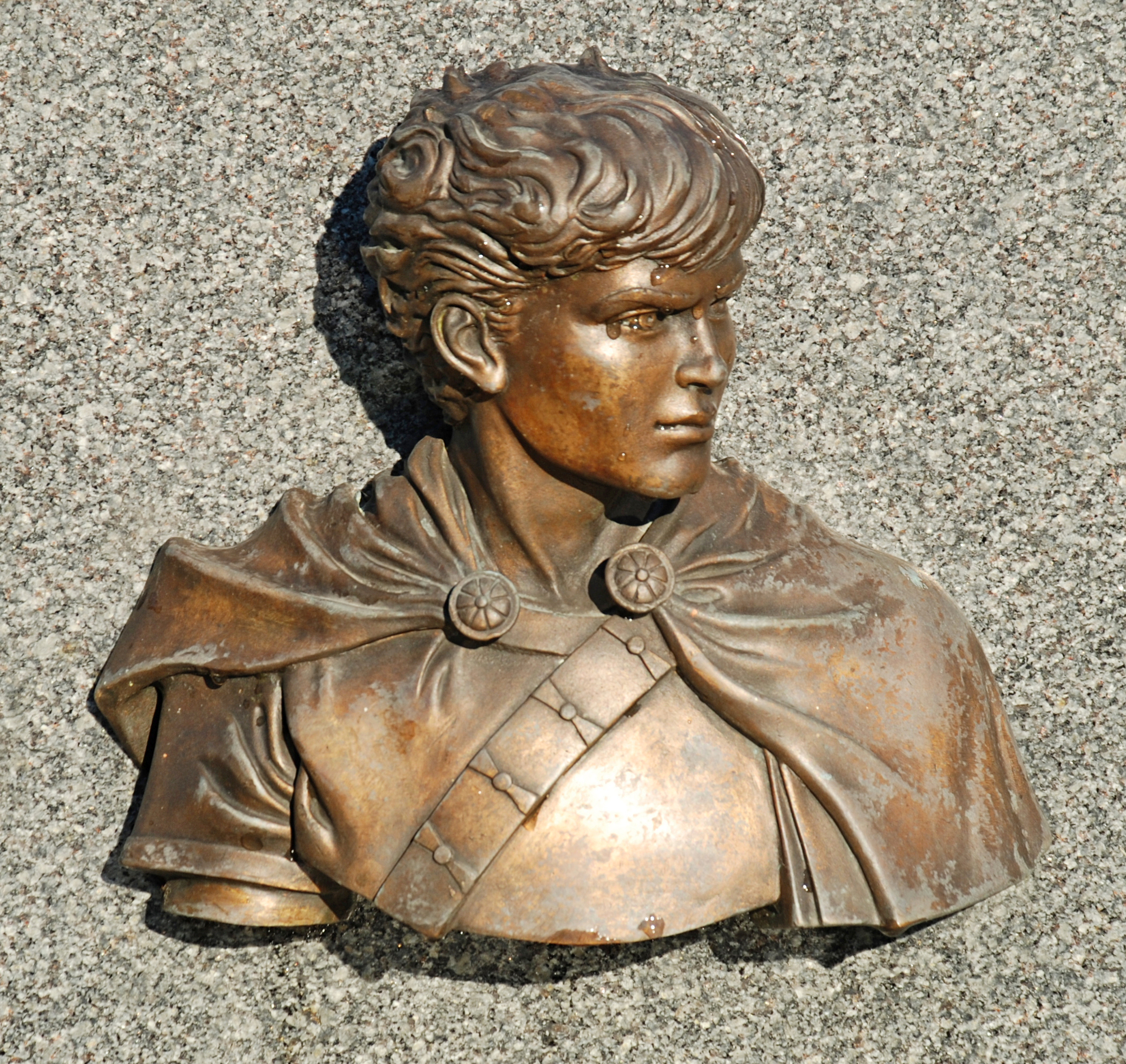
Bust of Alix on the tomb of Jacques Martin in Céroux (Ottignies-Louvain-la-Neuve, Belgium).

Alix is stunning, fearless, generous and devoted to just causes. Born in Gaul, separated from his parents and sold into slavery, he is later adopted by a Roman noble contemporary to Julius Caesar. This mixed background provides Alix with an identity crisis and divided loyalties, especially in the context of the founding myths of French nationalism revolving around Vercingetorix.

In the second adventure Alix is joined by Enak, a slightly younger Egyptian orphan, who remains his constant companion and sounding board. Originally forbidden to have a female companion by the 1949 law governing children's literature, Alix later finds himself entangled with amorous women, but he always hesitates to commit. The pursuit of social justice provides a pretext for moving on.

== The authors ==
Jacques Martin created the Alix series as one of his earliest heroes, and he continued solo conception, plot, dialogue and illustration for 50 years, even while developing other series such as Lefranc. Due to failing eyesight and advancing age, Martin gradually retired from the series from 1998, turning over tasks to various assistants. Rafael Morales became his first assistant, taking charge of the final illustrations with some assistance by Marc Henniquiau, while Martin continued writing the stories and performing the first sketches and layouts.

In 2006, Martin turned over the final writing task to François Maingoval, while still conceiving the main storyline in rough draft form. In 2008, Maingoval shifted his attention to a spin-off series Alix raconte, while Patrick Weber assumed the mantle of writing the main Alix series.

== Characters ==
- Alix Graccus: the hero of the series in the title role, pure of heart, perpetually sixteen and wise for his years.
- Enak: a boy of fourteen, who meets Alix in Le sphinx d'or. Not originally intended as a principal character, he becomes Alix's constant and faithful companion.
- Arbacès: sworn enemy of the heroes, this crafty and cruel Greek keeps turning up in their path.
- Julius Caesar: friend and protector of Alix, the latter nevertheless finds himself sometimes torn between just causes and the interests of the great man.
- Pompey: Caesar's rival, he repeatedly seeks to eliminate Alix, obviously without succeeding to end the series.
- Vanik: cousin of Alix.
- Astorix: Gallic chieftain, and father of Alix, not to be confused with Asterix, who was created over a decade later.
- Honorus Galla: Roman governor, friend and loyal lieutenant of Julius Caesar, who adopted Alix as his son.
- Heraklion: an orphan approximately the same age as Enak, entrusted to Alix's care after the death of Heraklion's mother who was a Grecian queen.

== Alix titles ==
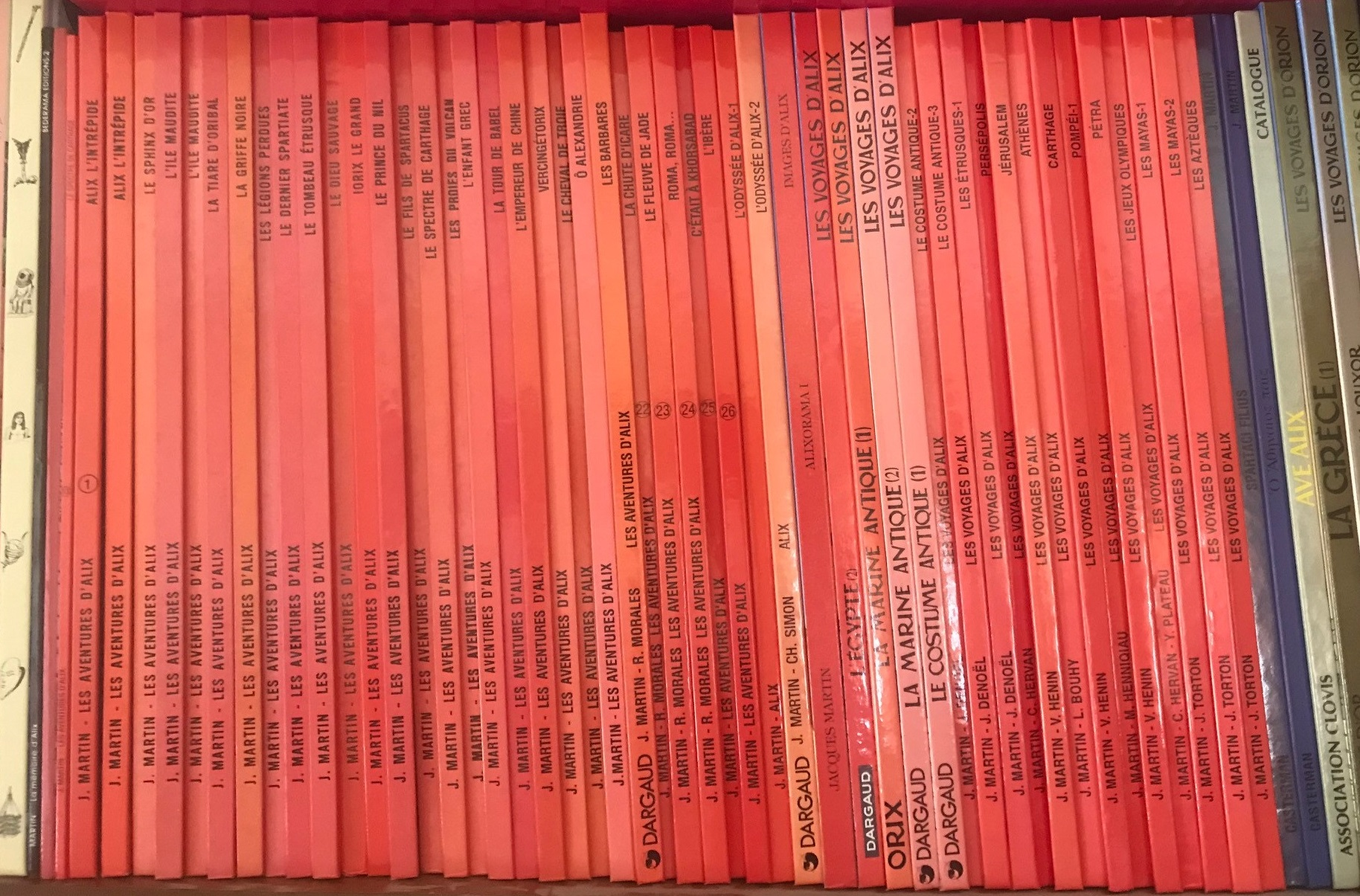
Alix books

The series first appeared as a serial in the Franco-Belgian comics magazine Tintin on 16 September 1948. Three more adventures appeared before Les Editions du Lombard (the publishing house responsible for Tintin magazine) began re-issuing them in hardcover book form. Lapsing in 1959, Lombard turned over rights to Casterman (publisher of The Adventures of Tintin) in 1965. After going out of print for several years, the earlier Lombard volumes were also reintroduced to new readers in 1969–1973. As Tintin magazine declined in sales and popularity, Vercingetorix (1985) was the last Alix story to appear in its pages. Thereafter, Alix was only published in book form.

=== The Adventures of Alix by Jacques Martin as sole creator ===
| Title | Tintin | Lombard | Casterman |
|---|---|---|---|
| 1. Alix l'intrépide | 1948–1949 | 1956 | 1973 |
| 2. Le sphinx d'or | 1949–1950 | 1956 | 1971 |
| 3. L'île maudite | 1951–1952 | 1957 | 1969 |
| 4. La tiare d'Oribal | 1955–1956 | 1958 | 1969 |
| 5. La griffe noire | 1958–1959 | 1959 | 1965 |
| 6. Les légions perdues | 1962–1963 | | 1965 |
| 7. Le dernier Spartiate | 1966–1967 | | 1967 |
| 8. Le tombeau étrusque | 1967–1968 | | 1968 |
| 9. Le dieu sauvage | 1969 | | 1970 |
| 10. Iorix le grand | 1971–1972 | | 1972 |
| 11. Le prince du Nil | 1973 | | 1974 |
| 12. Le fils de Spartacus | 1974 | | 1975 |
| 13. Le spectre de Carthage | 1976 | | 1977 |
| 14. Les proies du volcan | 1977 | | 1978 |
| 15. L'enfant grec | 1979 | | 1980 |
| 16. La tour de Babel | | | 1981 |
| 17. L'empereur de Chine | | | 1983 |
| 18. Vercingétorix | | | 1985 |
| 19. Le cheval de Troie | | | 1988 |
| 20. Ô Alexandrie | | | 1996 |

=== The adventures of Alix by Jacques Martin with collaborators ===
| Title | Year | Script | Illustration |
|---|---|---|---|
| 21. Les barbares | 1998 | Jacques Martin | Rafael Moralès; Marc Henniquiau |
| 22. La chute d'Icare | 2001 | Jacques Martin | Rafael Moralès; Marc Henniquiau |
| 23. Le fleuve de jade | 2003 | Jacques Martin | Rafael Moralès; Marc Henniquiau |
| 24. Roma, Roma... | 2005 | Jacques Martin | Rafael Moralès; Marc Henniquiau |
| 25. C'était à Khorsabad | 2006 | François Maingoval | Cédric Hervan; Christophe Simon |
| 26. L'Ibère | 2007 | François Maingoval; Patrick Weber | Christophe Simon |
| 27. Le démon de Pharos | 2008 | Patrick Weber | Christophe Simon |
| 28. La Cité engloutie | 2009 | Patrick Weber | Ferry |

=== The adventures of Alix without Jacques Martin ===
| Title | Year | Script | Illustration |
|---|---|---|---|
| 29. Le testament de César | 2010 | Marco Venanzi | Marco Venanzi |
| 30. La Conjuration de Baal | 2011 | Michel Lafon | Christophe Simon |
| 31. L'Ombre de Sarapis | 2012 | François Corteggiani | Marco Venanzi |
| 32. La derniere conquete | 2013 | Geraldine Ranouil | Marc Jailloux, Corinne Billon |
| 33. Britannia | 2014 | Mathieu Breda | Marc Jailloux |
| 34. Par-dela le Styx | 2015 | Mathieu Breda | Marc Jailloux |
| 35. L'or de Saturne | 2016 | Pierre Valmour | Marco Venanzi |
| 36. Le Serment du gladiateur | 2017 | Mathieu Breda | Marc Jailloux |
| 37. Veni, Vidi, Vici | 2018 | David B. | Giorgio Albertini |
| 38. Les Helvètes | 2019 | Mathieu Breda | Marc Jailloux |
| 39. Le Dieu sans nom | 2020 | David B. | Giorgio Albertini |
| 40. L'Œil du Minotaure | 2021 | Valérie Mangin | Chrys Millien |
| 41. La Reine des Amazones | 2023 | Valérie Mangin | Chrys Millien |
| 42. Le bouclier d'Achille | 2023 | Roger Seiter | |

=== Alix in English ===
Alix has seen little translation into English. In 1971 the London publisher Ward Lock & Co issued two titles, The Sacred Helmet (La tiare d'Oribal), and The Black Claw (La griffe noire). These books are now considered relatively rare. Two more titles, The Lost Legions (Les légions perdues), and The Altar of Fire (Le dernier Spartiate) were also projected for publication that year, but never appeared. A reviewer for the Times Literary Supplement found Alix singularly lacking in humour compared with Asterix, effectively killing prospects for continued publication in a market not yet accustomed to the wider Franco-Belgian tradition.

=== Alix in other languages ===
The strip has been translated into several other European languages, such as Portuguese, German, Dutch, Spanish, Greek (10 books) Finnish, Danish, Swedish - at least 9 books, Italian (22 books), English (only 2 books), Icelandic (6 books) and Catalan. It was also translated into other languages such as Indonesian (4 books), Vietnamese (1 book) and Chinese (non official version - 2 books). Le fils de Spartacus has been published in Latin as Spartaci Filius. The name of Alix in the Dutch language is Alex. (source)

In Sweden, Alix was presumably the second most popular adventure albums, after Tintin. However, the funny magazines Asterix and Lucky Luke sold better than Alix.

=== Works not in series ===
- L'odyssée d'Alix, by Jacques Martin (Casterman, 1987). ISBN 2-203-34902-6

== Spin-offs ==
=== Les Voyages d'Alix ===
This series depicts the culture and geography of antiquity with illustrations inspired by the adventures of Alix. Printed in full colour on higher quality stock than the comics series, these books aim to educate in a style identical to Jacques Martin's. Alix and Enak can frequently be seen in various settings. At least some of these books have been available in English; for example, "Egypt (1)", though they may now be out of print.

1. Rome 1 (illustrated by Gilles Chaillet) (1996)
2. L'Égypte 1 (illustrated by Rafael Moralès) (1996)
3. La marine antique 1 (illustrated by Marc Henniquiau) (1997)
4. La Grèce 1 (illustrated by Pierre de Broche) (1997)
5. La Grèce 2 (illustrated by Pierre de Broche) (1998)
6. Rome 2 (illustrated by Gilles Chaillet) (1999)
7. La marine antique 2 (illustrated by Marc Henniquiau) (1999)
8. Le costume antique 1 (illustrated by Jacques Denoël) (1999)
9. L'Égypte 2 (illustrated by Rafael Moralès) (2000)
10. Le costume antique 2 (illustrated by Jacques Denoël) (2000)
11. Carthage (illustrated by Vincent Hénin) (2000)
12. Athènes (illustrated by Laurent Bouhy) (2001)
13. Le costume antique 3 (illustrated by Jacques Denoël) (2002)
14. Jérusalem (illustrated by Vincent Hénin) (2002)
15. Pompéi 1 (illustrated by Marc Henniquiau) (2002)
16. Persépolis (illustrated by Cédric Hevan) (2003)
17. Pétra (illustrated by Vincent Hénin) (2003)
18. Les Mayas (illustrated by Jean Torton) (2004)
19. Les Étrusques (illustrated by Jean Torton) (2004)
20. Les Jeux Olympiques (illustrated by Cédric Hervan and Yves Plateau) (2004)
21. Les Mayas 2 (illustrated by Jean Torton) (2005)
22. Les Aztèques (illustrated by Jean Torton) (2005)
23. Lutèce (illustrated by Vincent Hénin) (2006)
24. Les Vikings (illustrated by Eric Lenaerts) (2006)
25. Les Incas (illustrated by Jean Torton) (2006)
26. Les Étrusques 2 (illustrated by Jacques Denoël) (2007)
27. La Chine (illustrated by Erwin Dreze (2008)
28. Alexandre le conquerant 1 (illustrated by De Wulf, Christophe Simon and De Marck) (2009)
29. L'Egypt 3 (illustrated by Rafael Morales and Leonardo Palmisano) (2009)
30. Lugdunum (illustrated by Gilbert Bouchard) (2009)
31. Orange-Vaison-La-Romaine (illustrated by Marco Venanzi and Alex Evang) (2010)
32. Vienna (illustrated by Gilbert Bouchard and Benoit Helly) (2011)
33. Nimes - Le Pont du Gard (illustrated by Jacques Denoel and Eric Teyssier) (2012)
34. Aquae Sextiae (Aix en Provence) (illustrated by Alex Evang, Yves Plateau and Jerome Presti) (2013)
35. Babylone - Mesopotamie (illustrated by Jean-Marie Ruffieux) (2013)

=== Alix raconte ===
Each book in this series presents a somewhat fictionalised biography of a famous person of Antiquity in comic strip form. When Alix is a contemporary of the subject, he occasionally appears as a secondary character. The scripts are written by François Maingoval, while the illustration has been done by different artists. The series is not available in English.

| Title | Year | Script | Illustration |
|---|---|---|---|
| 1. Alexandre le Grand | 2008 | François Maingoval | Jean Torton |
| 2. Cléopâtre | 2008 | François Maingoval | Éric Lenaerts |
| 3. Néron | 2008 | François Maingoval | Yves Plateau |

=== Alix Senator ===
A spin-off series that started in 2012. It is set in 12 BC when Alix is an older Roman senator, looking after Titus, his son, and Khephren, the son of Enak. This series is more realistic and darker than the original series.

| Title | Year | Script | Illustration |
|---|---|---|---|
| 1. Les Aigles de sang | 2012 | Valérie Mangin | Thierry Démarez |
| 2. Le Dernier Pharaon | 2013 | Valérie Mangin | Thierry Démarez |
| 3. La Conjuration des rapaces | 2014 | Valérie Mangin | Thierry Démarez |
| 4. Les Démons de Sparte | 2015 | Valérie Mangin | Thierry Démarez |
| 5. Le Hurlement de Cybèle | 2016 | Valérie Mangin | Thierry Démarez |
| 6. La montagne des morts | 2017 | Valérie Mangin | Thierry Démarez |
| 7. La Puissance et l'Éternité | 2018 | Valérie Mangin | Thierry Démarez |
| 8. La Cité des poisons | 2018 | Valérie Mangin | Thierry Démarez |
| 9. Les Spectres de Rome | 2019 | Valérie Mangin | Thierry Démarez |
| 10. La Forêt carnivore | 2020 | Valérie Mangin | Thierry Démarez |
| 11. L'Esclave de Khorsabad | 2020 | Valérie Mangin | Thierry Démarez |
| 12. Le Disque D'Osiris | 2021 | Valérie Mangin | Thierry Démarez |
| 13. L'Antre du Minotaure | 2022 | Valérie Mangin | Thierry Démarez |

=== Novels ===
In 2004, 4 novels about Alix were published by Casterman 4, written by Alain Hammerstein (pen name of Alain De Kuyssche) with illustrations by Jean-François Charles.

- Alix l'intrépide, 2004. (based on album 1: Alix l'Intrépide)
- Le Sortilège de Khorsabad, 2004.
- L'Ombre de César, 2004.
- Le Sphinx d'or, 2004. (based on album 2: The Golden Sphinx)

=== Television ===
Starting in 1999, an animated television series of 26 episodes was created that aired on France 3.

=== Parodies ===
- Alex l'Intrépide, by Dupa, in: Tintin magazine (29 Sept. 1981)
- Axile, by Roger Brunel, in: Pastiches tome 1, 1980 (Glénat)

== Awards ==
- 1978: Angoulême Best French Realistic Work, for Le spectre de Carthage
- 1979: Prix Saint-Michel Prize (Brussels) for the three series Alix, Lefranc and Jhen
- 1989: BD d'Or at 1st Salon Européen de la BD (Grenoble), for Le Cheval de Troie

== In popular culture ==
In the Belgian Comic Strip Center in Brussels the permanent exhibition brings homage to the pioneers of Belgian comics, among them Jacques Martin (despite being born in France). The room dedicated to his work is designed as a Roman balcony.

Alix is among the many Belgian comics characters to jokingly have a Brussels street named after them. Since 2006 the Boulevard Anspach/Anspach Boulevard has a commemorative plaque with the name Rue Alix/ Alex straat placed under the actual street sign.
