= The Mystery of the Great Pyramid, Volume 1: Manetho's Papyrus =

Comic book by Edgar P. Jacobs

The Mystery of the Great Pyramid, Volume 1: Manetho's Papyrus (Le Mystère de la Grande Pyramide, Tome 1)
- French cover
- Series: Blake and Mortimer

Original publication
- Published in: Tintin magazine
- Date of publication: March 23, 1950 to February 21, 1951
- Language: French

Translation
- Publisher: Les Editions Blake et Mortimer, Cinebooks
- Date: 1987, 2007

Chronology
- Preceded by: The Secret of the Swordfish
- Followed by: The Mystery of the Great Pyramid, Volume 2: The Chamber of Horus

The Mystery of the Great Pyramid, Volume 1: Manetho's Papyrus (French: Le Mystère de la Grande Pyramide, Tome 1) by the Belgian artist Edgar P. Jacobs was the fourth comic book in the Blake and Mortimer series, first published in Tintin magazine from March 23, 1950 to February 21, 1951. It appeared in book format in 1954, then was reprinted in a single-volume edition with Part 2 in 2011 (ISBN 9782870971697).

== Synopsis ==
Professor Philip Mortimer is going to Cairo, Egypt for a holiday. He soon gets mixed up in a weird business with ancient papyrus, heretic kings, lost treasures, an old nemesis, and the murder of his friend, Captain Blake. And now the dawns shall be reckoning before the temples of man.

== Plot ==
Invited by his friend, Egyptian Egyptologist Ahmed Rasim Bey, Philip Mortimer, accompanied by Nasir his servant, arrives in Cairo. Rasim Bey and his assistant Ben Zaim Abdul then show him a papyrus by Manetho, speaking about the Chamber of Horus and the Treasure of Aton. For Mortimer, there's no doubt there is in the Great Pyramid of Cheops an unknown secret room where the tomb of Akhenaten and his treasure lie hidden. But Mortimer discovers that Ben Zaim had hidden some of the papyrus and recovers it. One evening, Mortimer comes to the museum, to trap Ben Zaim and recover from him the document he lost when he was knocked out by Olrik, believed to have died during the destruction of Lhasa (in The Secret of the Swordfish, Volume 3). Mortimer is then determined to assist Commissioner Kamal, head of the Cairo police, to get hold of the members of the trafficking network which includes antique thief Olrik and Ben Zaim and well in Olrik has a length of ahead of him (having stolen the papyrus after stunning him). While it took Ben Zaim, Mortimer discovers a track in an antique shop whose assistant is a regular. He is greeted more than brutal Youssef, the seller, and Razul, supposed to have died in the Battle of the Strait of Hormuz, both members of the trafficking network. Mortimer then narrowly escapes Olrik.

It is the turn of Olrik to pass by the arrest because of an error of Ben Zaim. Olrik having put him to death, Commissioner Kamal decides not to listen to Mortimer, who is then forced to call his friend Francis Blake to the rescue to assist in its investigation. Meanwhile, Blake, Mortimer visits the Giza plateau where he meets the eccentric German Egyptologist, Dr. Großgrabenstein and second, the American Sharkey, who is none other than the henchman of Olrik. The first meeting between the man and Mortimer is pretty brutal because the second rescues a mysterious old man named Sheik Abdel Razek. At the end of Volume 1, Mortimer and Nasir learn that Blake was murdered during his stopover at Athens airport, and swear vengeance.

== Translations ==
=== English ===
A frame from the comic.

The Mystery of the Great Pyramid, Vol. 1 was first published in English by Les Editions Blake and Mortimer in 1987. ISBN 978-2870970089 Comcat Comics planned to publish an English version in 1990, under the title Secret of the Great Pyramid, Vol 1, but the company went bankrupt before it could come out. Cinebook Ltd published a translation in November 2007 ISBN 978-1-905460-37-3.
