= Le Rayon U =

Comic Book

A finely wrought character synopsis displayed at the Centre Belge de la Bande Dessinée, Brussels

Le Rayon U (The U Ray) is a comic book written and drawn by the Belgian comics creator Edgar P. Jacobs in 1943.

== Publication history ==
In 1941, the outbreak of war between Germany and the United States meant that American comic strips could no longer be imported into Nazi-occupied Europe.

Alex Raymond's strip, Flash Gordon, was then being published in the Belgian Franco-Belgian comics magazine Bravo. Artist and former opera singer, Edgar Pierre Jacobs was therefore asked to bring the current story to a conclusion, which he did. He was then commissioned to produce a science fiction comic strip of his own. Le Rayon U ("The U-Ray") began serial publication in Bravo in 1943. This version had text boxes which described the action and the dialogues in the style of many Belgian comics of the time, similar in a way to Hal Foster's version of Tarzan and Prince Valiant.

In 1974 Jacobs reformatted Le Rayon U in order to include speech bubbles. This version was published in Tintin magazine and in book form by Dargaud-Le Lombard.

The cartoonist Jean Van Hamme made a sequel to the Le Rayon U titled La Flèche Ardente that was released in 2023, the sequel is scripted by Van Hamme and illustrated by Christian Cailleaux and Étienne Schréder.

English translations of both Le Rayon U and La Flèche Ardente were published by Cinebook in September 2023 and scheduled for February 2024, respectively.

== Synopsis ==
Le Rayon U is set on an Earth-like planet which combines elements of the distant past, present and far future. Two of its nations, Norlandia and Austradia, are in conflict. A Norlandian scientist, Marduk, has devised a weapon called the "U Ray", but requires a mineral called uradium in order to put it to actual use.

Marduk therefore organises an expedition into an unknown part of the planet in order to find the uradium. Those accompanying him include: his assistant Sylvia Hollis; the explorer Lord Calder; Adji, Calder's Indian manservant; and Major Walton and Sergeant Mac Duff of the Norlandian secret service.

The explorers encounter all manners of threats, including prehistoric monsters, giant snakes and tigers, a tribe of hostile ape-men, and the meddling of Austradian spy Captain Dagon. More welcoming, but no less intriguing, is a civilisation of Aztec-like people.

== Characters ==
In itself Le Rayon U is a classic of Belgian science fiction, but the influence of Flash Gordon cannot be denied:

- The Austradian Emperor Babylos III resembles Ming the Merciless;
- In appearance, Marduk, Lord Calder and Major Walton are similar to Hans Zarkov, Prince Barin and Flash Gordon respectively;
- Like the dark-haired Dale Arden, the dark-haired Sylvia Hollis is coveted by almost every male character she meets, be it man or beast!

Dagon, the main villain, was modelled on Jacobs himself. Marduk, Calder and Dagon were to be the models for Mortimer, Blake and Olrik, in Jacobs's classic series Blake and Mortimer.
