= Edgar P. Jacobs. Le rêveur d'apocalypses =

2021 comic book by François Rivière and Philippe Wurm

- Page count: 144 pages
- Publisher: Glénat Éditions

Creative team
- Writer: François Rivière
- Artist: Philippe Wurm

Original publication
- Date of publication: 8 December 2021
- Language: French
- ISBN: 9782344003916

Edgar P. Jacobs. Le rêveur d'apocalypses (lit. 'The Dreamer of Apocalypses') is a 2021 French comic book written by François Rivière and illustrated by Philippe Wurm. It is a biography about the Belgian comics creator Edgar P. Jacobs.

== Plot ==
The book covers how Edgar P. Jacobs tried to become an opera singer as a young man, studied art, got into comics by making a conclusion to Flash Gordon when it was interrupted by the German occupation of Belgium during World War II, became a collaborator of Hergé on The Adventures of Tintin, and created his own greatest success Blake and Mortimer.

== Reception ==
Didier Pasamonik of ActuaBD called the book a visual "marvel", writing that Philippe Wurm is the true heir of Jacobs' drawing style, and has recreated the atmosphere and locations of interwar and post-war Brussels and Walloon Brabant with great attention to detail. Pasamonik criticised the portrayal of Jacobs as a hesitant and indecisive person, which is contrary to his own impressions.

The book received the 2022 Prix Historia for historical comics.
