= The Affair of the Necklace (disambiguation) =

The Affair of the Necklace is a 2001 film starring Hilary Swank.

The Affair of the Necklace may also refer to:

- Affair of the Diamond Necklace, a scandal in France in the 1780s
- The Necklace Affair (L'Affaire du Collier), a 1967 Blake and Mortimer comic book
- L'affaire du collier de la reine, a 1946 French film directed by Marcel L'Herbier
- Controversy over the loss of a necklace by the favorite wife of the Islamic prophet, Muhammad by Aisha (circa 623–632 CE).

== See also ==
- The Queen's Necklace (disambiguation)
