= S.O.S. Meteors: Mortimer in Paris =

Comic book

S.O.S. Meteors: Mortimer in Paris (S.O.S. Meteores: Mortimer à Paris)
- Original Cover
- Series: Blake and Mortimer
- Publisher: Les Editions Blake et Mortimer (Dargaud-Lombard)

Creative team
- Writers: Edgar P. Jacobs
- Artists: Edgar P. Jacobs

Original publication
- Published in: Tintin magazine
- Language: French

Translation
- Publisher: Cinebook Ltd
- Date: September 2009
- ISBN: 978-1-905460-97-7
- Translator: Jerome Saincantin

Chronology
- Preceded by: Atlantis Mystery
- Followed by: The Time Trap

S.O.S. Meteors: Mortimer in Paris is the eighth comic book in the Blake and Mortimer series by Edgar P. Jacobs. It was first published in Tintin magazine.

== Synopsis ==
The world's weather has gone mad. Professor Mortimer responds to an invitation by his friend Professor Labrousse. While travelling to see his friend, Mortimer's cab crashes and he finds himself a new adventure right on his friends doorstep.

== Plot ==
While Western Europe suffered for several months from weather disasters, Mortimer arrives in Paris to meet his French friend, the meteorologist Professor Labrousse. In a taxi that takes him to Gare des Invalides through the Royal Street, Mortimer and the driver witness a serious accident caused by a blue Ford Custom. Then at the station of Versailles - Rive Gauche, a taxi sent by Labrousse and led by a certain Ernest takes him to the destination, the teacher's house in Jouy-en-Josas.

However, on the road, the headlights of the car failed while the black night fell. Fortunately, a postman named Louis offers them to follow him, but ends after a few minutes. Ernest confused the headlights of the postal truck with those of the Blue Custom. The excessive speed of the car bandits causes an accident with the taxi that plunged it into a pond. Ernest then tries to find relief, Mortimer falls in the water and narrowly escapes drowning. Having reached the mainland, hitchhiking allows him to reach his destination. There, after reports of his adventures to his friend, he gives his hypothesis about the causes of climate events: having noticed that only Western Europe is affected by these disasters, he deduces that it is the work of enemies of the West and not from nature.

The next day, the two characters learn of the police that the taxi was found in Étang de la Geneste and Ernest was not found. Mortimer, Labrousse and he then travel to a place where people are mysterious. Mortimer then identifies the blue Ford Custom prowlers hear the Rue Royale. Then, after a brief investigation, he discovers that the accident could not have happened in Geneste Pond and therefore concludes that someone sought to move the location of the accident. He finally discovers that the taxi returned to the park at Troussalet Castle. There, he recognizes the pond of the accident, before being kidnapped by masked men.

The next day in Paris, at the Ministry of the Interior, Blake helps Commissioner Pradier, head of the DST, to struggle against a foreign spy network operating in France. While studying the letter of the Paris headquarters of the Swedish firm Scandinavia, whose leader is a Per Enrik Quarnstron, he discovered a microfilm hidden in the header. It is the Professor Labrousse who translates the code. Indeed, this message is simply a weather report which promises significant disruption for the evening. All of this reinforces the theory of Mortimer. If Labrousse came, it was to talk to Blake about Mortimer's mysterious disappearance.

Blake and Labrousse then leave for Jouy-en-Josas but first go to Labrousse's apartment at Vaugirard Street. They then meet the Swedish neighbor Labrousse, Mr. Henry, very embarrassed when he learns that Labrousse thought he saw his Custom near Geneste pond. Then Blake and Labrousse arrive at Jouy-en-Josas where Blake, discovering that the phone and the car were sabotaged, seeing a blue Custom is parked outside the house and learning that Mr. Henry's real name is Per Enrik Quarnstron, concluded that Mr. Henry is head of the network of spies and that the occupants of the Custom will do everything to prevent them from contacting Paris. Blake initially tries to join the station Jouy but having been spotted by Sharkey and Freddy, the occupants of the Custom, he steals the postal truck of Louis and a great pursuit between Peugeot and American car in which the Police will also participate then begins. Finally, Blake takes the train to Massy Palaiseau and it's on the train and then the subway that the pursuit continues. Blake manages to elude his pursuers and returned in Mr. Henry's apartment, who is none other than Olrik. Sharkey and Freddy are there and Blake leaves. Then it was the turn of Olrik, Sharkey and Freddy being sued because Pradier and his men arrive at Vaugirard Street, but the three robbers manage to escape through the roof thanks to significant disturbances predicted by the code.

After returning to the ministry, Blake, Pradier and Labrousse intercept a new coded message: a large fog will cover the entire Western Europe in two days, perfect weather for an invasion. The DST therefore has two days to find Olrik. Meanwhile, at Troussalet Castle, the network center, Mortimer was presented to Professor Miloch Georgevitch who shows him the command center of a weather station on the Cirrus network. Miloch explains that while this station and all those of the Cirrus network decide the weather on Western Europe for months and explain the process. Then Mortimer is back to his cell where he will await his deportation to the foreign power is behind it all.

Two days later, on the 13th, Blake finally discovered that the network center was the Troussalet Castle and friends leave the ministry when they discover that the fog has become stultifying. Blake, Pradier and a few men, all equipped with gas masks, thus moving towards the castle and reach Satory, where soldiers who are protected too, join them. Meanwhile, Mortimer found Ernest, who was also captured. Together they escape and accidentally trigger the self-destruction of the base. They then managed to leave the castle and find Blake, Pradier and others. Since the station 001 at Troussalet Castle is the central station of the Cirrus network, the fog disappears and Western Europe is saved. The whole gang, including Olrik, was captured, only Miloch is missing.

== English publication ==
The first publication in English was by Cinebook Ltd in September 2009.
