= Pieter van der Does =

Dutch admiral

Pieter Van der Does Earl of Warmond
- Born: 17 January 1562; Leiden, Holland
- Died: 24 October 1599 (38)
- Cause of death: Malaria
- Occupation: Admiral
- Spouse: Phillipa Van Duvenvoorde
- Parents: Jacob Van der Does, Earl of Noordwijk (father); Clara Van Adrichem (mother)

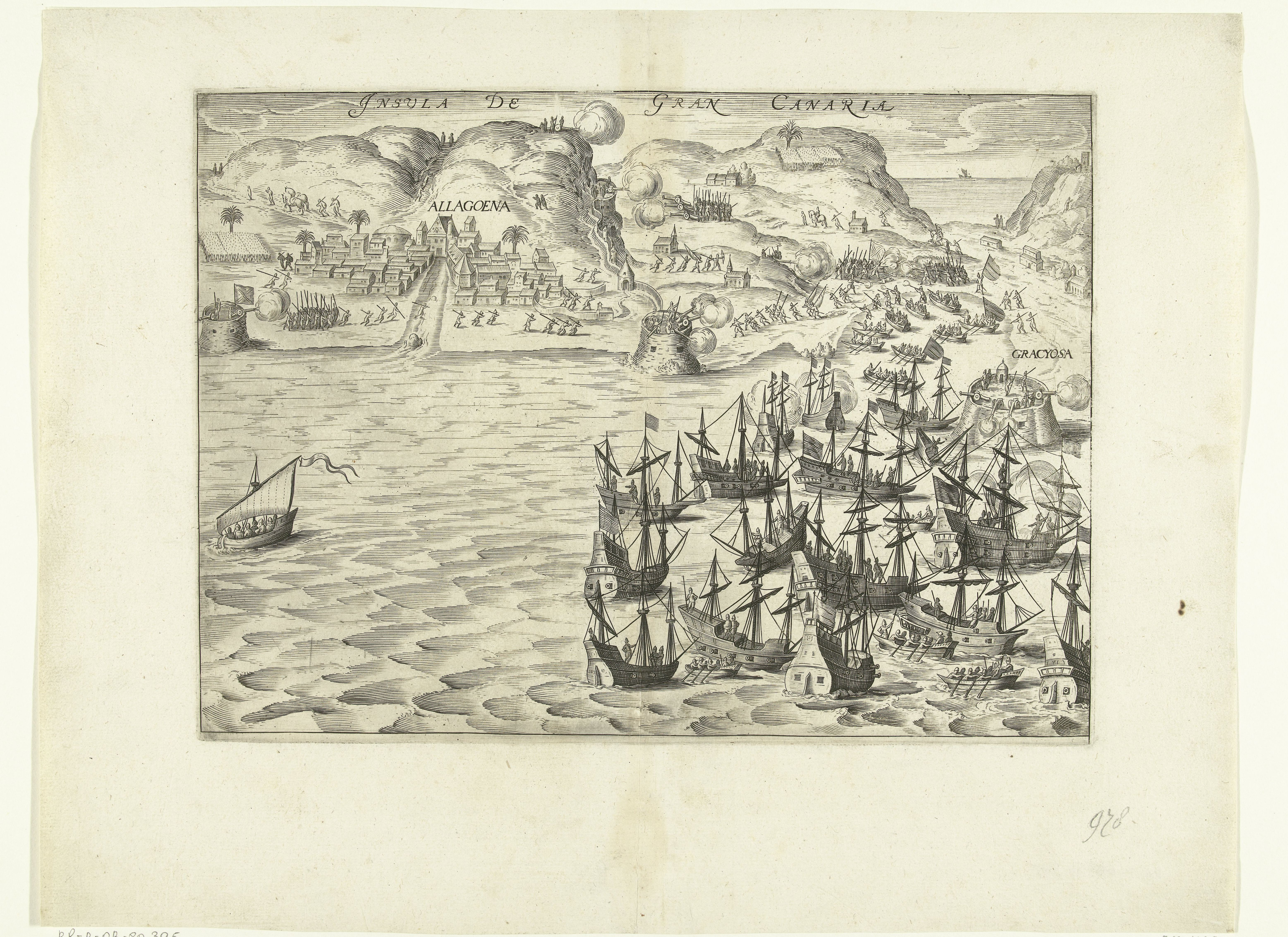
Van der Does's attack on Las Palmas in a Dutch engraving. The town is mislabeled Allagoena out of confusion with La Laguna, Tenerife.

Pieter van der Does (Leiden, 1562 - São Tomé Island, 24 October 1599) was a Dutch naval commander. He was the son of Jacob van der Does (c.1500-1577), schepen of Leiden during its siege.

== Life ==
Pieter Van Der Does was born in Leiden. In 1586 he became superintendent of the Dutch fleet which witnessed the defeat of the Spanish Armada two years later. In 1588, he was wounded at the siege of Geertruidenberg. In 1587, he was also bailiff and dijkgraaf of the Rijnland water board, and in 1588 chief schout of Leiden. On 23 December 1588, he received the post of vice-admiral of West Holland, and sometime later he was also master-general of the artillery. In 1594, he was wounded during the siege of Groningen. For his services the States of Holland and West Friesland granted him the fiefdoms of Vriesekoop and Rijnsaterwoude and the title of jonkheer.

In 1597 he was vice-admiral in the Admiralty of the Maze and in 1599 a vice-admiral in the Admiralty of Amsterdam. In May 1599, he led a Dutch and Zeeland fleet which set out to blockade the Iberian coast as part of the Eighty Years' War. En route, they attacked the Spanish possession of Las Palmas de Gran Canaria, but this was heavily defended, and the attack was unsuccessful. It then moved to attack Spanish possessions in West Africa around Sao Tomé, where Van Der Does died, either of wounds received at Las Palmas or of Malaria.
