= Valérie Mangin =

French comic book writer (born 1973)

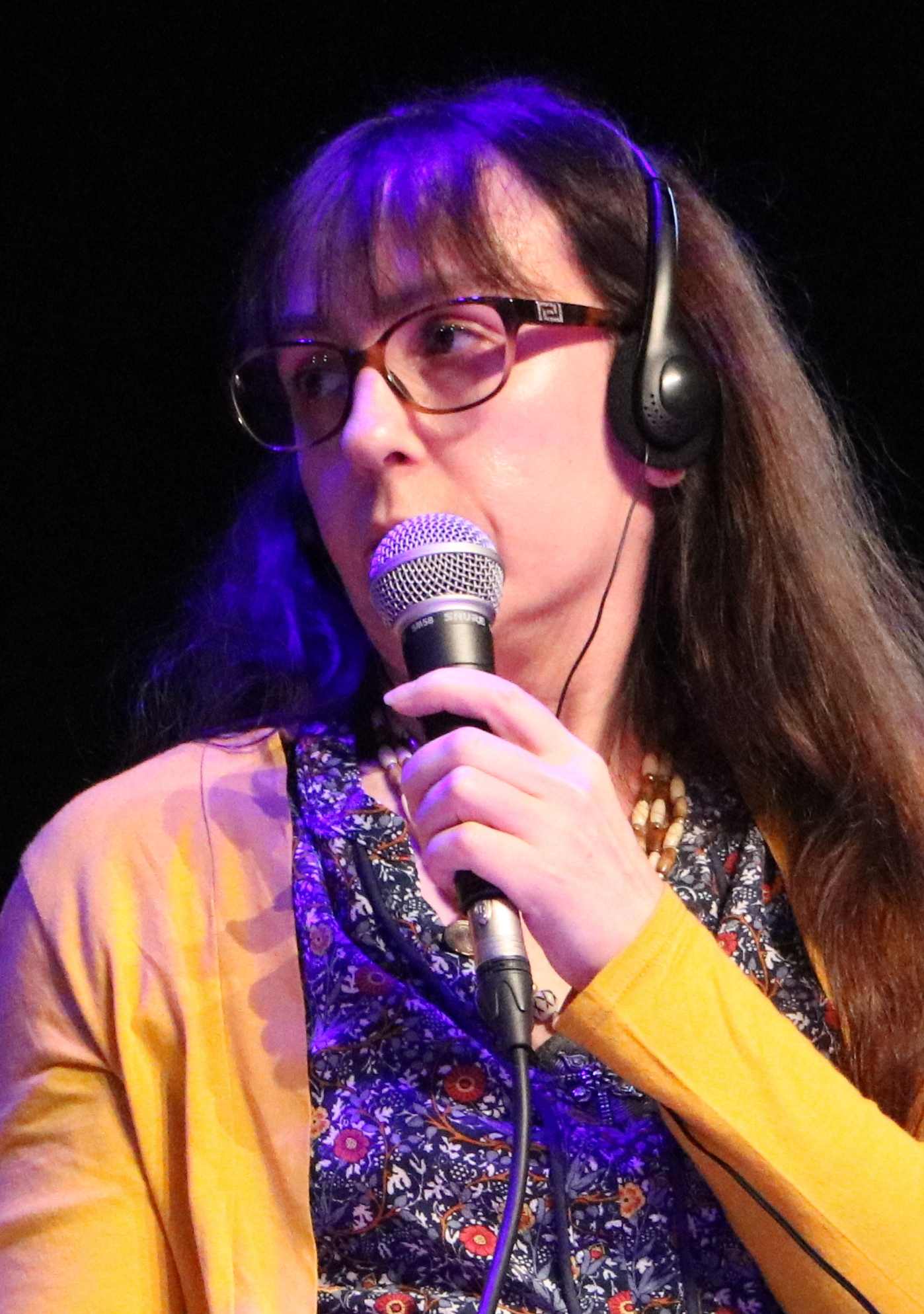
- Born: 14 August 1973 (age 52); Nancy, Grand Est, France
- Occupation: Comics writer

Valérie Mangin (born 14 August 1973 in Nancy) is a French comic book writer.
