= Bob de Moor =

Belgian comics artist (1925–1992)

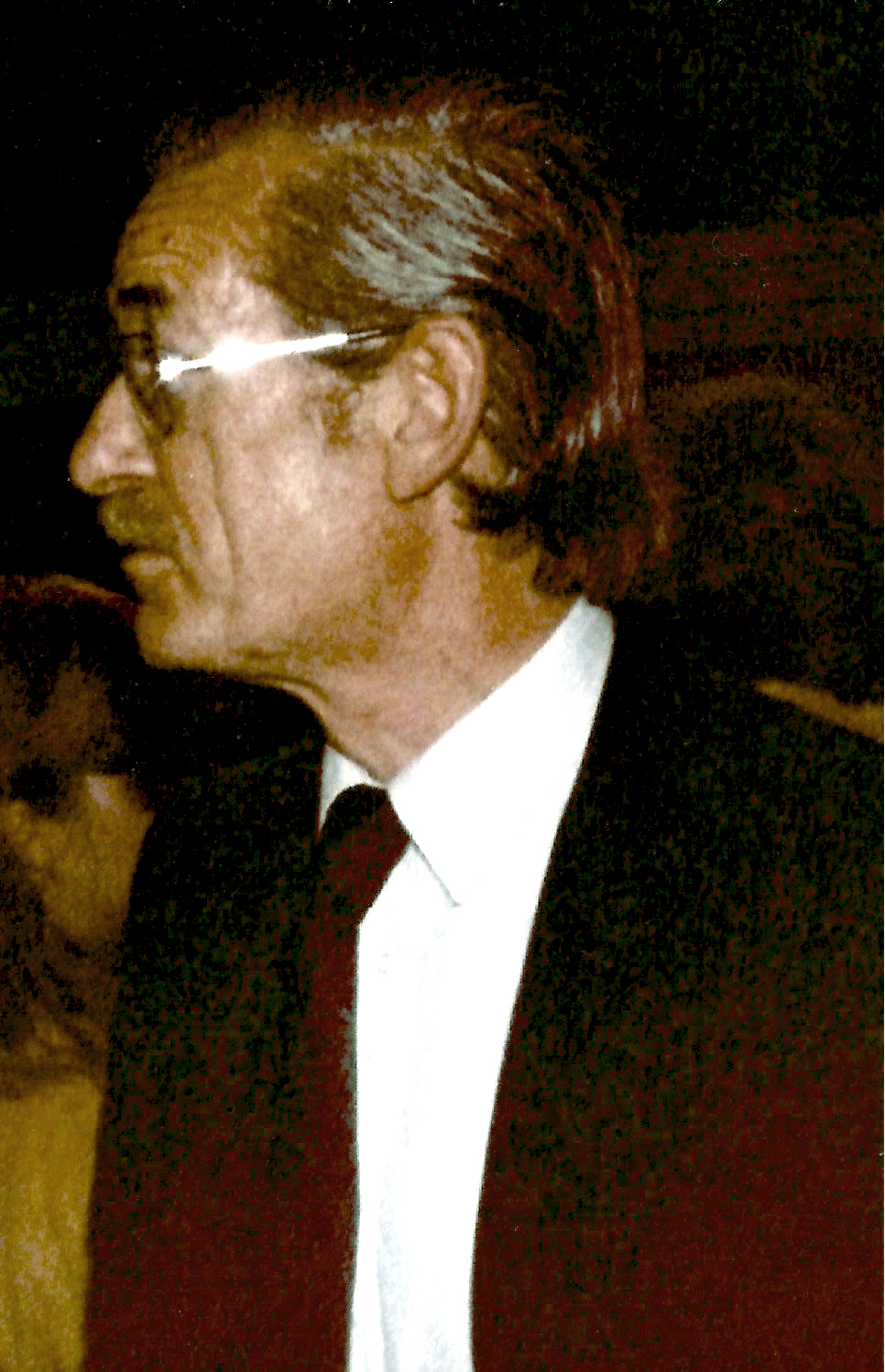
- Born: Robert Frans Marie De Moor; 20 December 1925 Antwerp, Belgium
- Died: 26 August 1992 (aged 66) Brussels, Belgium
- Areas: artist, writer
- Notable works: Cori, de Scheepsjongen, The Adventures of Tintin; Barelli; Johan et Stephan
- Awards: full list

Robert Frans Marie De Moor (20 December 1925 – 26 August 1992), better known under his pen name Bob de Moor, was a Belgian comics creator. Chiefly noted as an artist, he is considered an early master of the Ligne claire style. He wrote and drew several comics series on his own, but also collaborated with Hergé on several volumes of The Adventures of Tintin. He completed the unfinished story Professor Sató's Three Formulae, Volume 2: Mortimer vs. Mortimer of the Blake and Mortimer series, after the death of the author Edgar P. Jacobs.

== Biography ==
Bob de Moor started drawing with pencil at three or four. Living in a port town, he developed a strong interest for drawing sailing ships which carried into his professional career with his Cori, de Scheepsjongen series and other work. Following studies at the Antwerp Academy of Fine Arts, De Moor started his career at the Afim animations studios. His first album was written in 1944 for "De Kleine Zondagsvriend".

Beginning in March 1951, starting with Destination Moon, he began a collaboration with Hergé on Tintin albums and Tintin-related material which included extensive work on sketch studies, backgrounds, layout, and ultimately animated films.

His co-worker Jacques Martin is quoted as saying that de Moor had an extraordinary facility to adapt himself to the style of others. This manifested itself in a seamless integration with Hergé's style, as well as in him being asked on occasion to complete the work of other artists.

De Moor illustrated the album cover of "A World of Machines" (1982) by the Belgian band The Machines.

His son Johan de Moor is also a cartoonist, and completed his father's last album, the fifth in the Cori le Moussaillon series, after his father's demise.

== Bob de Moor and Tintin ==
Bob de Moor worked at Studio Hergé from April 1951 to the end of 1986. For Hergé, he was the perfect assistant because he was one of the few who could draw his figures just as well or even better than himself. Among the most important works of de Moor on Tintin and Milou are:

·The complete redrawing and revision of the 7th Tintin-Adventure "The Black Island" (1965), for which de Moor was sent by Hergé to England and Scotland in 1962 to find or search for original locations. The cover is also drawn by Bob de Moor.

· While Hergé was on a trip in the summer of 1965, a reporter for the Swiss magazine L’illustré asked De Moor and Jacques Martin if any progress had been made on a new Tintin adventure. Without Hergé's knowledge, the pair created a fake page that they managed to pass off as a genuine extract from an unfinished Tintin book. The page was printed in the magazine, and Hergé - while initially upset - later relented and purchased the work.

·Tintin and the Lake of Sharks (1972). Bob de Moor drew and colorized the 47-page film album based on a scenario by Michel Greg.

· One of de Moor's most important works was the drawings for the 1976 album "Tintin and the Picaros". Although Hergé denied that the complete album was drawn at the drawing table by Bob de Moor, most of the drawings probably came from de Moor's hand.

== Bibliography ==
Series	Remarks
Johan en Stefan / Johan et Stephan	9 volumes
De raadselachtige meneer Barelli / L'énigmatique monsieur Barelli	8 volumes
Cori, de Scheepsjongen / Cori le Moussaillon	6 volumes
Professeur Troc / Monsieur Tric	3 volumes
De avonturen van Nonkel Zigomar / Les aventures d'Oncle Zigomar	6 volumes

- 1949 Le Vaisseau Miracle
- 1949 Guerre dans le Cosmos, Ed. Coune
- 1950 Le Lion de Flandre, Ed. Deligne
- 1950 L'Enigmatic Monsieur Barelli, Ed. du Lombard
- 1950 Monsieur Tric, Ed. Bédéscope
- 1951 Les Gars des Flandres, Ed. Bédéscope
- 1951 Conrad le Hardi, Ed. Bédéscope
- 1952 Barelli à Nusa-Penida
- 1959 Les Pirates d'eau douce
- 1964 Balthazar
- 1966 Barelli et les agents secrets, Ed. du Lombard
- 1971 Le Repaire du loup, Ed. Casterman
- 1972 Barelli et le Bouddha boudant, Ed. du Lombard
- 1973 Bonne Mine à la mer (Barelli), Ed. du Lombard
- 1974 Barelli et le seigneur de Gonobutz
- 1978 Cori le Moussaillon: Les Espions de la Reine, Ed. Casterman

== Sources ==
Footnotes

- Bob de Moor publications in Belgian Tintin Archived 15 October 2007 at the Wayback Machine and French Tintin Archived 16 October 2007 at the Wayback Machine BDoubliées (in French)
- Bob de Moor index of Tintin and Kuifje covers LeJournalDeTintin.free (in French)
- bdparadisio.com (in French)
- De Moor bio, BD Gest' Bedetheque (in French)
