= Edgar P. Jacobs =

Belgian comic book creator (1904–1987)

- Born: Edgard Félix Pierre Jacobs; 30 March 1904 Brussels, Belgium
- Died: 20 February 1987 (aged 82) Lasne-Chapelle-Saint-Lambert, Belgium
- Areas: Artist, writer, colorist
- Notable works: Blake and Mortimer; Le Rayon U
- Awards: Full list

Edgard Félix Pierre Jacobs (30 March 1904 – 20 February 1987), better known under his pen name Edgar P. Jacobs, was a Belgian comic book creator (writer and artist), born in Brussels, Belgium. He was one of the founding fathers of the Franco-Belgian comics movement, through his collaborations with Hergé and the graphic novel series that made him famous, Blake and Mortimer.

== Biography ==
Edgar Félix Pierre Jacobs was born in Brussels in 1904. Jacobs remembered having drawn for as far back as his memory would go. His real love though was for the dramatic arts and the opera in particular. In 1919 he graduated from the commercial school where his parents had sent him, and privately swore he would never work in an office. He kept on drawing in his spare time, focusing his greatest attention on musical and dramatic training. He took on odd jobs at the opera, including decoration, scenography, and painting, and sometimes got to work as an extra. In 1929 he received the annual Belgian government medal for excellence in classical singing. Financial good fortune did not follow, since the Great Depression hit the Brussels artistic community very hard.

After a career as extra and baritone singer in opera productions between 1919 and 1940 in Brussels and Lille, punctuated by small drawing commissions, Jacobs turned permanently to illustration, drawing commercial illustrations and collaborating in the children's weekly comic magazine Bravo until 1946, after he was introduced there by Jacques Laudy. This review or periodical was a smashing success, hitting a circulation of 300,000 at times.

When the American comic strip Flash Gordon was prohibited in Belgium by the German occupation authorities during World War II, he was asked to write an end to the comic in order to provide a denouement to the readers. German censorship banned this continuation after only a couple of weeks. Jacobs subsequently published his first comic strip in Bravo, Le Rayon U (The U Ray), largely in the same Flash Gordon style.

Around this time, he became a stage painter for a theatre adaptation for Hergé's Cigars of the Pharaoh. Although the play was only a modest success, it brought him into contact with Hergé and the two quickly become friends. As a direct result, he assisted Hergé in coloring the black and white strips of The Shooting Star from Le Soir in preparation for book publication in 1942, and from 1944 on he helped him in the recasting of his earlier albums Tintin in the Congo, Tintin in America, King Ottokar's Sceptre and The Blue Lotus for color book publication. After the project, he continued to contribute directly in the drawing as well as the storyline for the new Tintin double-albums The Seven Crystal Balls/Prisoners of the Sun. Jacobs, as a fan of opera, decided to take Hergé with him to a concert. Hergé did not like opera, however, and for decades he would gently lampoon his friend Jacobs through the device of opera singer Bianca Castafiore, a supporting character in The Adventures of Tintin. Hergé also gave him tiny cameo roles in Tintin adventures, sometimes under the name Jacobini, for example in The Calculus Affair where Jacobini is the name of an opera singer advertised as starring alongside La Castafiore in Gounod's Faust, and as a mummified egyptologist on the cover of Cigars of the Pharaoh, as well as in the rewritten version. In a 1977 interview with the BBC (excerpted in 2016 on the Witness radio program/podcast), Hergé stated that Jacobs was part of his inspiration for the major character of Captain Haddock: "He [Jacobs] is just like Captain Haddock, full of movement...bursting into...invective."

In 1946, Jacobs was part of the team gathered by Raymond Leblanc around the new Franco-Belgian comics magazine Tintin, where his story Le secret de l’Espadon (The Secret of the Swordfish) was published on 26 September, the first of the Blake and Mortimer series.

In 1947, Jacobs asked to share the credit with Hergé on The Adventures of Tintin. When Hergé refused, their collaboration suffered a bit of a setback. Hergé still remained a friend however, and as before Blake et Mortimer continued to be serialised in Tintin magazine. In 1950, Jacobs published The Mystery of the Great Pyramid. Many others soon followed. Jacobs finally published in 1970 the first volume of The Three formulas of Professor Sato, which was staged in Japan.

In 1973 he restyled his first full-length album, Le Rayon U, and wrote his autobiography under the title Un opéra de papier: Les mémoires de Blake et Mortimer. He then wrote the scenario for the second episode of Les Trois Formules du Professeur Sato, but the artwork remained unfinished at the time of his death. Bob de Moor was drafted in to complete the album, which was published in 1990.

Jacobs' style varies greatly from one album to another. There are however many common threads, such as the theme of subterranean descent and the consistent ligne claire drawing style.

Jacobs has two stone sphinxes to commemorate him. One of them is in the Bois des Pauvres near Brussels, where his home used to stand, and the other one is over his tomb at the Lasne cemetery, also near Brussels. The cemetery sphinx has a "collar" beard, and his face looks a lot like Philip Mortimer, the protagonist of most of the Jacobs albums.

Edgar P. Jacobs. Le rêveur d'apocalypses (lit. 'The Dreamer of Apocalypses') is a biographical comic book about Jacobs published by Glénat Éditions in 2021. It was written by François Rivière and illustrated by Philippe Wurm.

== Bibliography ==
1. Le Rayon U (The U Ray), in 1943
2. Le Secret de l'Espadon (The Secret of the Swordfish), in 1947 (3 volumes)
3. Le Mystère de la Grande Pyramide, (The Mystery of the Great Pyramid), in 1950 (2 volumes)
4. La Marque Jaune (The Yellow "M"), in 1953
5. L'Énigme de l'Atlantide (Atlantis Mystery), in 1955
6. S.O.S. Météores: Mortimer à Paris (S.O.S. Meteors), in 1958
7. Le Piège diabolique (The Time Trap) in 1960
8. L'Affaire du Collier (The Necklace Affair) in 1965
9. Les trois Formules du Professeur Sato: Mortimer à Tokyo (Mortimer in Tokyo) in 1970 (vol. 1). Vol. 2 Mortimer contre Mortimer (Mortimer versus Mortimer) completed by Bob De Moor, 1990

== Awards ==
- 1971: Grand Prix Saint-Michel, Belgium

== Sources ==
- Guyard, Jean-Marc. Le Baryton du neuvième art. Bruxelles: Éditions Blake et Mortimer, 1996. ISBN 2-87328-000-X
- Jacobs, Edgar P. Un opéra de papier: Les mémoires de Blake et Mortimer. Paris: Gallimard, 1981. ISBN 2-07-056090-2
- Lenne, Gérard. L'Affaire Jacobs. Paris: Megawave, 1990. ISBN 2-908910-00-4
- Mouchart, Benoit. A l'ombre de la ligne claire: Jacques Van Melkebeke, le clandestin de la B.D. Paris: Vertige Graphic, 2002. ISBN 2-908981-71-8
- Mouchart, Benoît and Rivière, François La Damnation d'Edgar P. Jacobs, Seuil-Archimbaud, 2003. ISBN 2-02-085505-4
- Tzorken, Yann Le mystère Edgar P. Jacobs, Thebookedition, 2019. ISBN 9780244195830
- Edgar P. Jacobs publications in Belgian Tintin and French Tintin BDoubliées (in French)
