= The Valley of the Immortals =

The Valley of the Immortals (La Vallée des Immortels)
- First edition (French)
- Date: 2018
- Series: Blake and Mortimer

Creative team
- Writers: Yves Sente
- Artists: Peter van Dongen and Teun Berserik

Original publication
- Language: French

Translation
- Publisher: Cinebook Ltd

Chronology
- Preceded by: The Testament of William S.
- Followed by: Eight Hours in Berlin

The Valley of the Immortals is the twenty-fifth album of the comic series Blake and Mortimer, written by Yves Sente and drawn by Peter van Dongen and Teun Berserik, based on the characters created by Edgar P. Jacobs.

== Plot ==
The plot begins shortly after the end of the events of The Secret of the Swordfish. China is torn apart by the clash between the Maoists and the nationalists of Chiang Kai-shek. Captain Blake is instructed by the Intelligence Service to travel to Hong Kong to ensure its protection. In London, Mortimer is interested in a Chinese archaeological object, but he quickly realizes that he is not alone in coveting it. A warlord, Xi-Li, is waiting for the opportunity to take advantage of the Chinese conflict to secure his power over the entire country, thanks to a mysterious manuscript. He also recruits a former officer of Basam-Damdu, the late dictator of Lhasa: Colonel Olrik.

== Making of the album ==
The Valley of the Immortals is the first album designed by Peter Van Dongen and Teun Berserik. The two designers are each distributed 27 of the 54 plates of the album and draw each one on his side, then correct each other. Teun Berserik believes that his strong points are the technical part and the characters, while the city sets are the strong point of Peter Van Dongen.

The cover, which shows Mortimer travelling in the streets of Hong Kong by rickshaw, is a reference to The Blue Lotus, published by Hergé in 1934–1935. That album's minor character "Gibbons" makes a cameo appearance.

The plot, meanwhile, is written by Yves Sente, which is the eighth album he has done for Blake and Mortimer, the first having been The Voronov Plot published in 2000. The album explores a period that Jacobs said nothing in his albums: the one following the end of the Third World War recounted by The Secret of the Swordfish. Sente also tries to explain what happened to Olrik after his defeat alongside the dictator Basam-Damdu at the end of the Secret of the Swordfish. The theme of immortality, placed at the heart of the plot, seeks to pick up keywords typically "Jacobian" to stay close to the atmosphere of albums by EP Jacobs.

The album was printed in 400,000 copies for its launch in bookstores in mid-November 2018.

== Sources ==
- bdnet.com
