= Jonathan Septimus =

Fictional character in the Blake and Mortimer series

- Blake and Mortimer character
- First appearance: The Yellow "M"
- Created by: Edgar P. Jacobs (1953)
- Voiced by: Maurice Jacquemont (1956); Hervé Bellon (1997)

In-universe information
- Alias: Dr. Wade
- Occupation: Psychiatrist
- Origin: United Kingdom
- Enemies: Philip Mortimer; Francis Blake
- Albums: The Yellow "M"; The Septimus Wave; The Call of the Moloch; The Bride of Dr Septimu

Professor Jonathan Septimus is a fictional character in the Blake and Mortimer series, created by Belgian artist Edgar P. Jacobs. He makes his inaugural appearance in The Yellow "M", the third adventure and sixth album of the series, which was serialized in Tintin magazine on 5 August 1953.

A psychiatrist based in London, Dr. Septimus is a member of the high society of the Centaur Club. However, his outwardly gentlemanly demeanor conceals his true personality and thirst for revenge. His work on human mind control, published under the pseudonym Dr. Wade in the 1920s, was met with considerable opposition and criticism from journalists and the scientific community alike. Subsequently, he was exiled to Sudan, but returned to London before the outbreak of World War III, with the intention of exacting retribution. In his secret laboratory, he developed the "telecephaloscope", a device that uses the "Mega Wave" to control the brain of Olrik remotely, commanding him to commit a series of crimes marked with the letter μ in yellow chalk. Ultimately, Septimus is unmasked by Professor Mortimer before his creation turns against him, resulting in his destruction with his invention.

Jonathan Septimus represents the archetypal "evil scientist" in the oeuvre of Blake and Mortimer. His character is situated within a long tradition of literary and cinematic depictions of cursed scientists, evoking figures such as Dr. Jekyll, Dr. Mabuse, and Dr. Caligari.

== The character in the series ==
=== Fictional biography ===
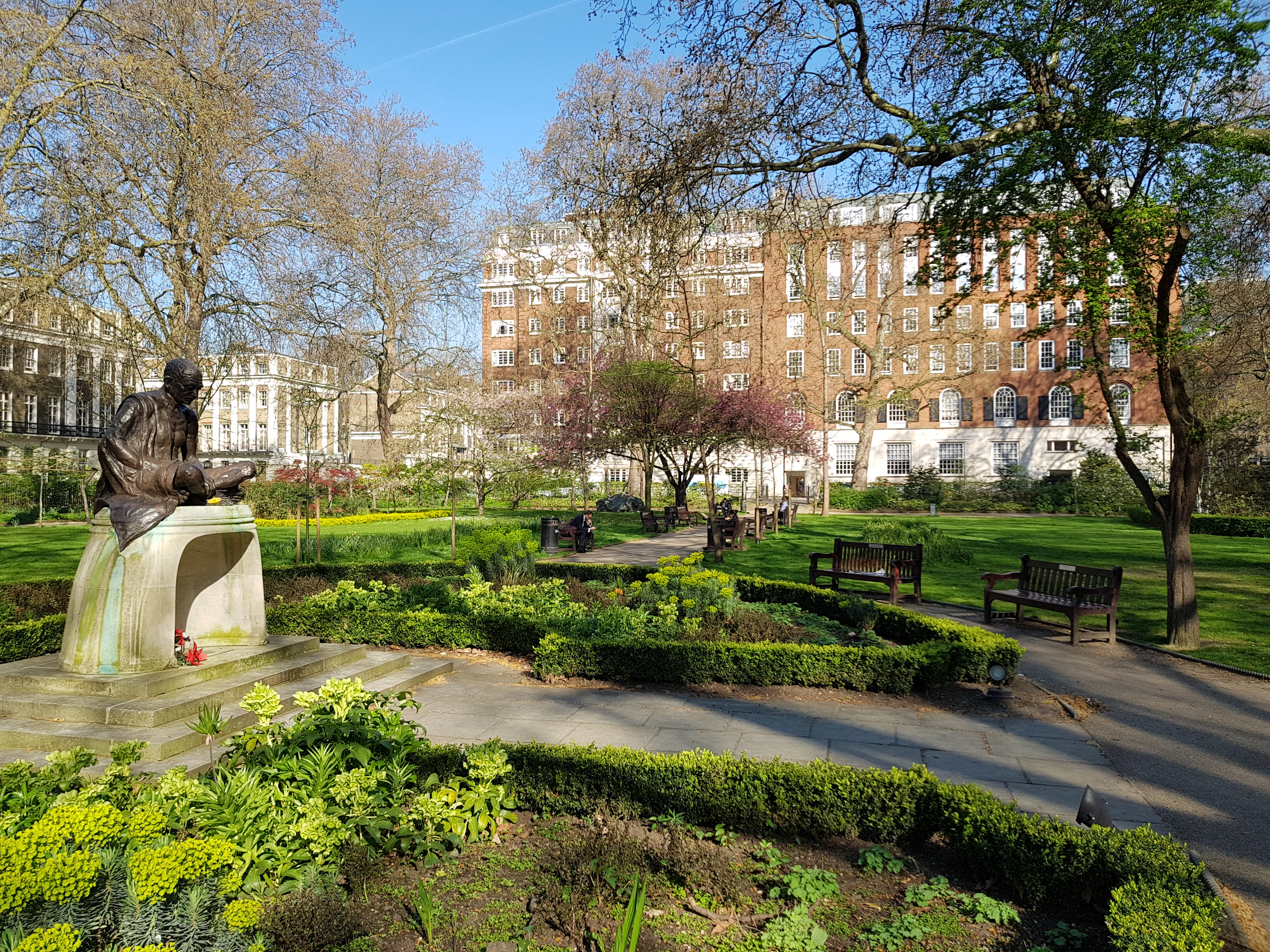
Tavistock Square, home of Dr Septimus.

Jonathan Septimus is a psychiatrist based in London who has published many scientific monographs. He wears glasses and has an "intense and penetrating gaze, accentuated by the cold, arrogant sneer of his mouth." Septimus is outwardly respectable and is known to frequent the Centaur Club, as are many other gentlemen of London's high society. The impressive library in his home serves as a testament to his erudition. His personality, however, is more troubled. He exhibits a proclivity for emotional volatility, manifesting in both outbursts and periods of despondency.

In 1920, he discovered the "Mega Wave", which he identified as the cerebral wave responsible for controlling the mind, actions, and instincts. (Note: Jacobs 2013, Plate 49, Panels 3–4) He published his findings under the pseudonym Dr. J. Wade, asserting that "the individual who could capture and control the Mega Wave of a specific individual would master all their mental activity and transform them into a docile, powerful instrument." (Note: Jacobs 2013, Plate 49, Panels 5) The book was met with considerable controversy and criticism. His publisher, James Thornley, filed a defamation lawsuit but ultimately lost when Judge Vernay ruled that "not only is this book a scientific heresy, but it also endangers public morals." (Note: Jacobs 2013, Plate 49, Panels 6–9) Following Thornley's demise, Jonathan Septimus relocated to Fanaka, a modest community in Sudan's Blue Nile region. (Note: Jacobs 2013, Plate 50, Panels 1) The district commissioner bestowed upon him the responsibility of caring for a man discovered wandering in the desert, exhibiting signs of amnesia. This individual was none other than Colonel Olrik, whom Septimus intended to use as a test subject to substantiate his hypotheses. He affectionately dubbed him "Guinea pig" and returned to London at the advent of World War III. (Note: In his work, the author Edgar P. Jacobs identifies the conflict in question as the war initiated by the Yellow Empire in The Secret of the Swordfish, the inaugural adventure in the series. However, he makes a chronological misstep, as Olrik plays a pivotal role in this conflict as a colonel in the army of the tyrant Basam Damdu.) (Note: Jacobs 2013, Plate 50–51)

In response to the directives of the army's health services, Dr. Septimus constructed a shelter beneath his Tavistock Square residence, where he established a laboratory to pursue his research. A highly accomplished scientist, he clandestinely developed the "telecephaloscope", a device using the Mega Wave to regulate Olrik's brain functions from a distance, thereby fulfilling his aspiration for retribution against those who had previously humiliated him.

=== Appearances in the albums ===
==== Central role in The Yellow "M" ====
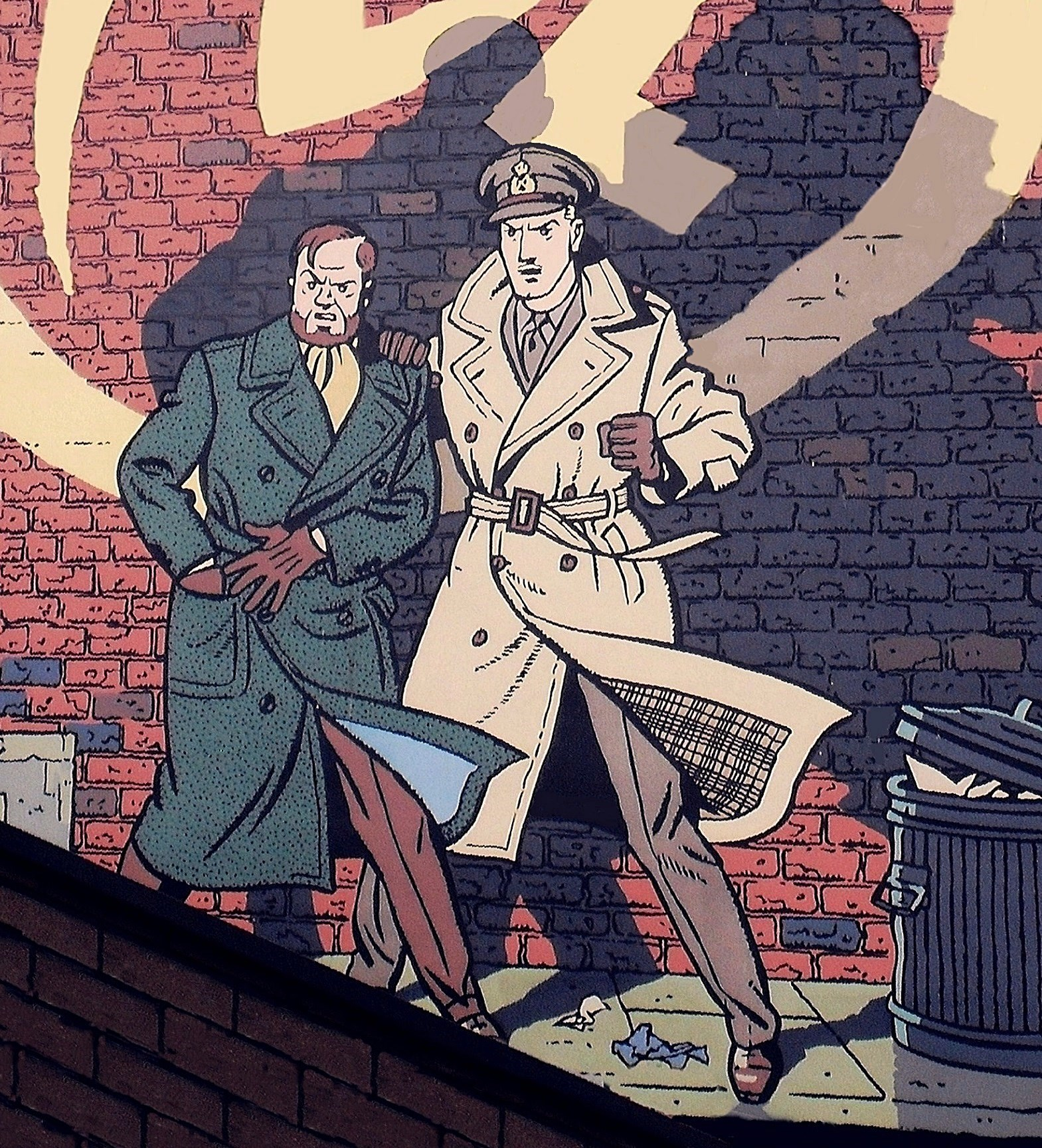
Blake and Mortimer painted on a wall in Brussels, in a fresco featuring the cover of The Yellow "M"

Professor Jonathan Septimus makes his inaugural appearance on page six of The Yellow "M", which was pre-published in Tintin magazine on 5 August 1953. At the beginning of the narrative, the protagonist spends the evening at the Centaur Club with Leslie Macomber, the editor of the Daily Mail; Hugh Calvin, a judge; and Raymond Vernay, a professor. Like them, he is introduced to Captain Francis Blake of MI5, the British intelligence service, and his friend Philip Mortimer. (Note: Jacobs 2013, Plate 6) As a result of the actions of a mysterious figure, London is engulfed in panic as he marks his crimes with the letter μ in yellow chalk. (Note: Jacobs 2013, Plate 1–3)

In the aftermath of the abductions of Vernay, Macomber, and Calvin, (Note: Jacobs 2013, Plate 7–14) Captain Blake secures the police protection of Jonathan Septimus and persuades him to depart from London. However, during his journey, Septimus is abducted by train to his Suffolk cottage. (Note: Jacobs 2013, Plate 15–20) While Blake and Scotland Yard Inspector Glenn Kendall pursue multiple leads, Mortimer conducts his investigation and discovers a link between the four victims: a 1922 case involving the publication of a book titled The Mega Wave, written by the mysterious Dr. Wade. He locates a copy of the book and determines that its true author is none other than Jonathan Septimus. (Note: Jacobs 2013, Plate 20, 31) Mortimer promptly takes a taxi to Limehouse Dock, where the Yellow "M" has set a trap for Captain Blake. The police successfully thwart the criminal's plan, and Mortimer intercepts the perpetrator. (Note: Jacobs 2013, Plate 34–35) A chase ensues, leading Mortimer to Septimus's hideout, where he is astonished to find Olrik, his archenemy, under the influence of Dr. Septimus, operating behind the Yellow "M." (Note: Jacobs 2013, Plate 42–47)

Dr. Septimus discloses the truth to Mortimer while he is held captive. Blake and Kendall eventually locate him with the assistance of the taxi driver who had transported him to Limehouse Dock. (Note: Jacobs 2013, Plate 60–61) Law enforcement officials then proceed to Septimus's residence, forcibly breaching the reinforced door to the professor's clandestine laboratory. Inside, Olrik is abruptly liberated from the doctor's influence by a phrase Mortimer utters, resulting in his betrayal of his master and the use of his apparatus to annihilate him. Dr. Septimus is ultimately reduced to ashes. (Note: Jacobs 2013, Plate 63–65)

==== The Septimus Wave ====
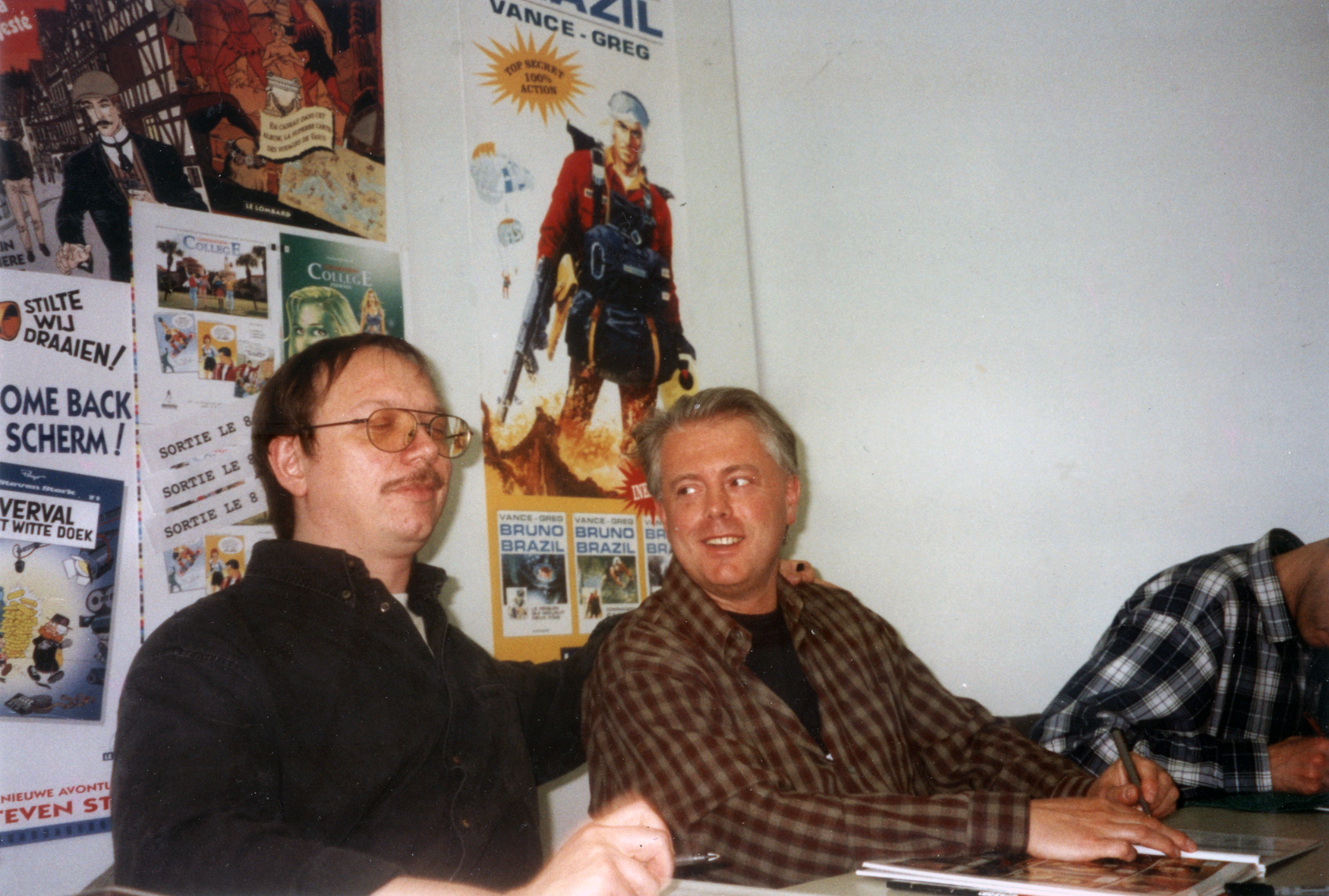
Jean Dufaux (right) continues the plot of The Yellow M in The Septimus Wave.

In 2013, the twenty-second album in the Blake and Mortimer series, entitled The Septimus Wave, was released. The text was written by Jean Dufaux, and the illustrations were created by Antoine Aubin and Étienne Schréder. This adventure serves as a sequel to The Yellow "M", taking place several months after the preceding narrative and reintroducing numerous characters from Jacobs's album. In this narrative, four devotees of Professor Jonathan Septimus—Lieutenant McFarlane, Lady Rowana, banker Oscar Balley, and Professor Evangely—prepare to resume his research clandestinely. Professor Mortimer also endeavors to unravel the enigmas of the Mega Wave in his laboratory situated in the periphery of London. In his absence, the telecephaloscope activates independently, conjuring an image of Dr. Septimus. (Note: Dufaux, Aubin & Schréder 2013, Plate 9-11)

Meanwhile Captain Blake investigates a mysterious illness affecting Major Banks's troops, which causes them to experience delirium as if preparing for an enemy attack. After his treatment at Bedlam Hospice, (Note: Dufaux, Aubin & Schréder 2013, Plate 28–34) Blake discovers a cavernous structure housing a spacecraft of a kind, positioned on its side. Upon entering the structure, he encounters the image of Dr. Septimus in a giant column of liquid crystals, which subsequently vanishes to reveal a figure clad in a diving suit, presumably in control of the vessel. (Note: Dufaux, Aubin & Schréder 2013, Plate 39–40) Concurrently, Mortimer is incarcerated in Professor Evangely's laboratory, where he encounters Olrik too. Mortimer succeeds in triggering the telecephaloscope's disruptor before being rendered unconscious, while throngs of Septimus doppelgängers swarm outside the warehouse and in London's streets. The telecephaloscope appears to malfunction, continuously generating the doctor's image. (Note: Dufaux, Aubin & Schréder 2013, Plate 43–51)

Ultimately Captain Blake decides to destroy the mysterious spaceship. Meanwhile, Mortimer, temporarily allied with Olrik, uses the telecephaloscope on him, this time giving him control over the Mega Wave. The colonel joins Blake inside the ship, urges him to leave, and triggers an explosion that destroys it. (Note: Dufaux, Aubin & Schréder 2013, Plate 57–63)

==== Other appearances ====
In 2020 Jean Dufaux authored the script for a new sequel, entitled The Call of the Moloch, which constituted the twenty-seventh album in the series. The illustrations were provided by Christian Cailleaux and Étienne Schréder. Scholars have critiqued the narrative as lacking convincingness. This adventure represents the conclusion of a trilogy initiated with The Yellow "M." While Jonathan Septimus's role is minimal, he is referenced on numerous occasions throughout the album. This is evident in instances such as Mortimer's summarization of previous adventures (Note: Dufaux, Cailleaux & Schréder 2020, Plate 5) and the auctioning off of the hypnotic disc used by the doctor to subdue his victims. (Note: Dufaux, Cailleaux & Schréder 2020, Plate 22) Septimus's silhouette reappears when Francis Blake drives an explosives-laden truck into the Moloch, resulting in its destruction. (Note: Dufaux, Cailleaux & Schréder 2020, Plate 50)

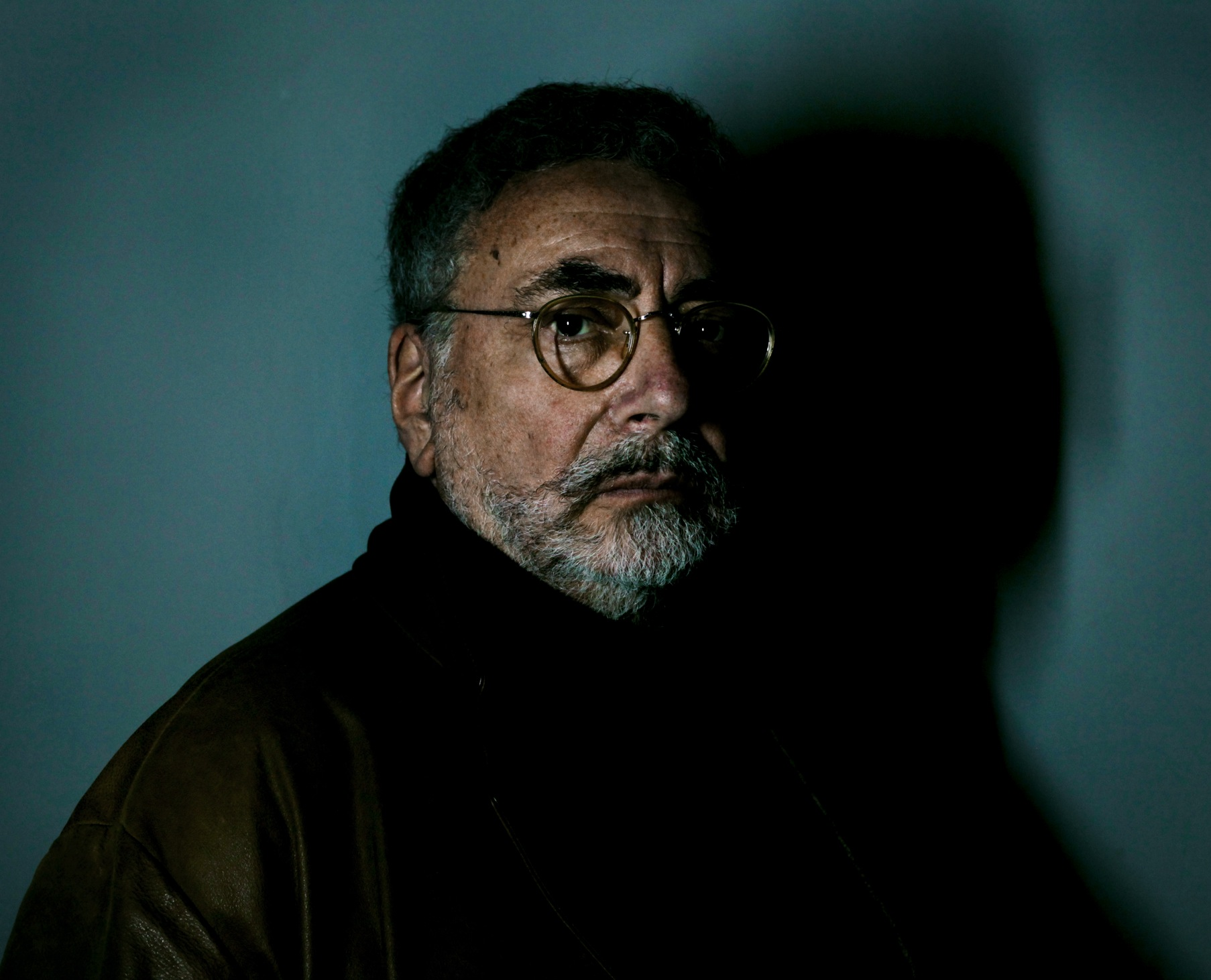
François Rivière, one of Jacobs' biographers and author of The Bride of Dr Septimus.

In September 2021, Blake et Mortimer editions released The Bride of Dr Septimus, a picture book written by François Rivière and illustrated by Jean Harambat. This constituted part of a spin-off series. This adventure directly references Edgar P. Jacobs and The Yellow "M", as well as British director James Whale's films, particularly The Bride of Frankenstein (1935). In this narrative, Whale returns to London in the 1950s to adapt The Yellow "M" Affair for the screen. Professor Mortimer, who assisted in resolving the case, is consulted for his expertise during the film's production.

A series of enigmatic occurrences guides the two men, accompanied by Richard Murray, Francis Blake's nephew, to the desolate residence of Doctor Septimus. There, they uncover a clandestine laboratory where the brain of biologist Ursula Phelps, Septimus's partner, is preserved. Due to his experiments, the organ, sustained and linked to an electrical apparatus, can control machinery. Ultimately, Professor Mortimer annihilates it in a conflagration.

== Sources of inspiration ==
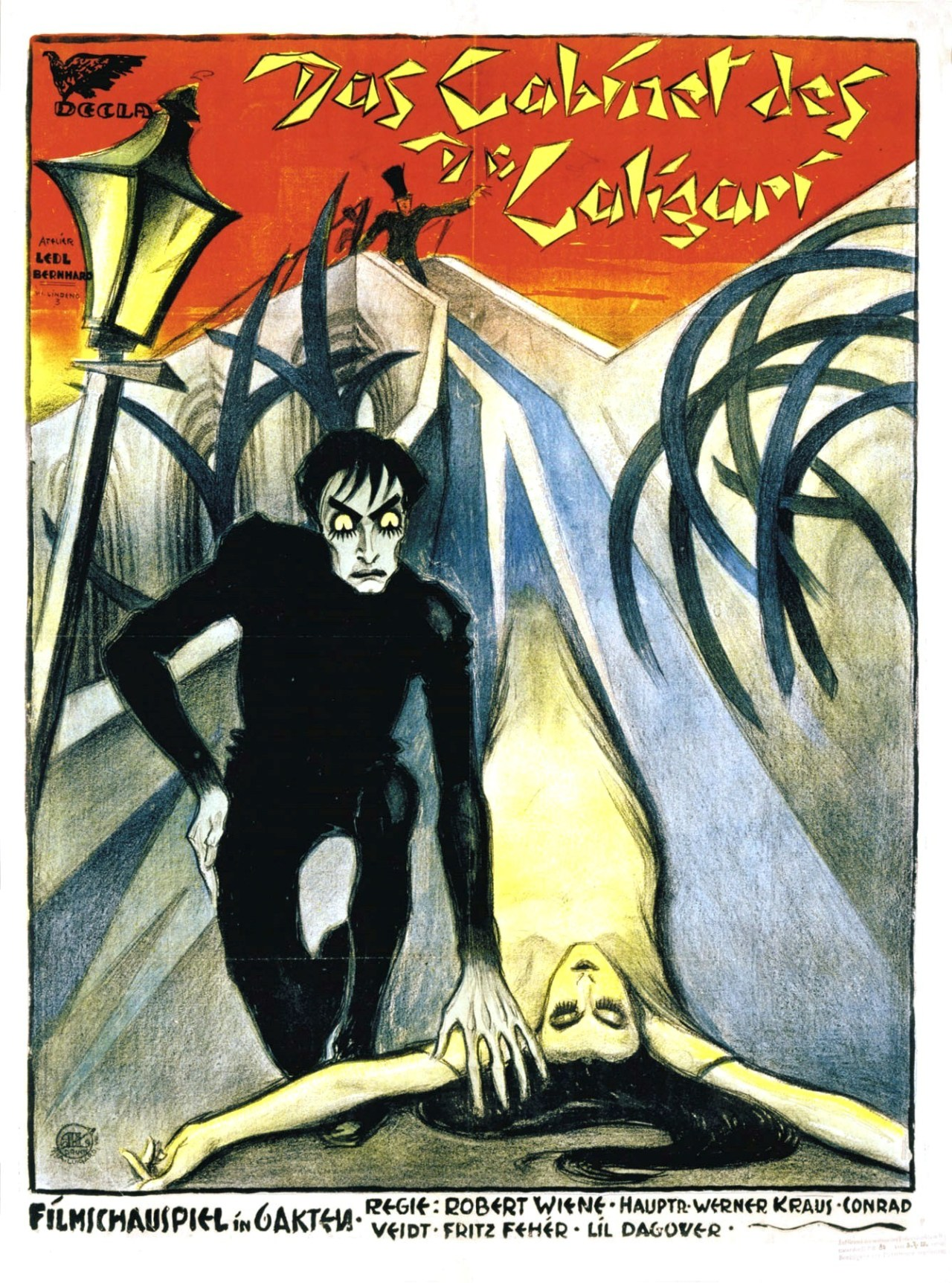
The poster for the film The Cabinet of Dr. Caligari, the plot of which inspired Jacobs.

The Blake and Mortimer albums are replete with cinematic allusions. The character of Doctor Jonathan Septimus is directly inspired by Septimus Pretorius, a malevolent figure who assists the scientist Victor Frankenstein in James Whale's 1935 film The Bride of Frankenstein.

Moreover Robert Wiene's 1920 film The Cabinet of Dr. Caligari significantly influenced Jacobs's writing of The Yellow "M", particularly in terms of its dreamlike and nightmarish atmosphere, and the portrayal of the master-slave relationship between the film's protagonists. In the film, Dr. Caligari employs hypnosis on Cesare to induce him to perpetrate criminal acts, thereby enabling the doctor to exact retribution on society. This is analogous to how Dr. Septimus manipulates Olrik in The Yellow "M." Additionally, the character of Jonathan Septimus evokes that of Doctor Mabuse, as created by Luxembourgish writer Norbert Jacques and brought to the screen by Fritz Lang in the 1922 film Dr. Mabuse, The Gambler. Like Mabuse, Septimus represents a threat to the established moral and political order of his country.

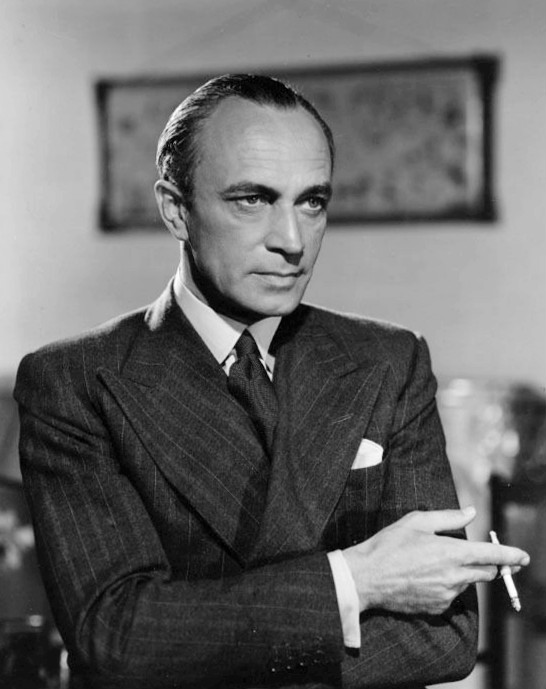
Conrad Veidt (1941) as Dr. Septimus.

The artist's physical inspirations are diverse. For instance, Edgar P. Jacobs drew upon the likeness of his partner's uncle, Arthur Vasselio, while also incorporating the characteristics of actor Conrad Veidt into his portrayal in Friedrich Wilhelm Murnau's 1920 film, The Haunted Castle.

Septimus's personality is also shaped by a multitude of influences, including those of Dr. Caligari and Dr. Mabuse. Additionally, Jacobs's character evokes the image of Dr. Gogol, a mad, megalomaniac scientist and murderer portrayed by Peter Lorre in Karl Freund's 1935 film Mad Love.

== Analysis ==
=== The mad scientist archetype ===
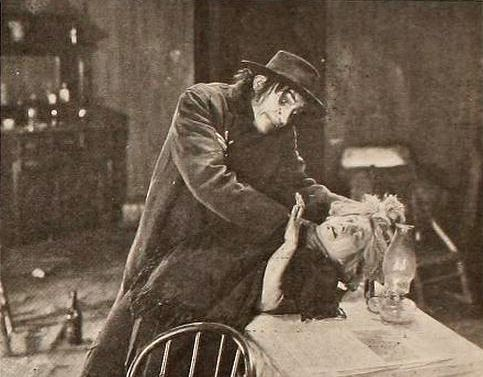
Like Robert Louis Stevenson's Dr. Jekyll, played here by Sheldon Lewis in a 1920 film, Dr. Septimus embodies the cursed mad scientist.

Semiotician Pierre Fresnault-Deruelle posits that The Yellow "M" aligns with the "marvelous black" aesthetic, which he characterizes as "an offshoot of Anglo-Saxon Romanticism, where fear constitutes the main driving force of the narrative." He further suggests that Dr. Septimus echoes the main character in Robert Louis Stevenson's Strange Case of Dr Jekyll and Mr Hyde. Jonathan Septimus represents the archetypal mad scientist and is the inaugural example of a brilliant yet sinister scientist operating in a hidden laboratory, a role that Edgar P. Jacobs is particularly fond of. Subsequently, the author introduces Professor Miloch in SOS Météores and The Time Trap, with the role being reprised by Dr. Zong in The Strange Encounter, scripted by Jean Van Hamme. In a broader context, the disintegration of Jonathan Septimus after the album aligns him with the literary tradition of the "cursed scientist", who is traditionally destroyed by his creation.

=== Embodiment of evil and deception ===
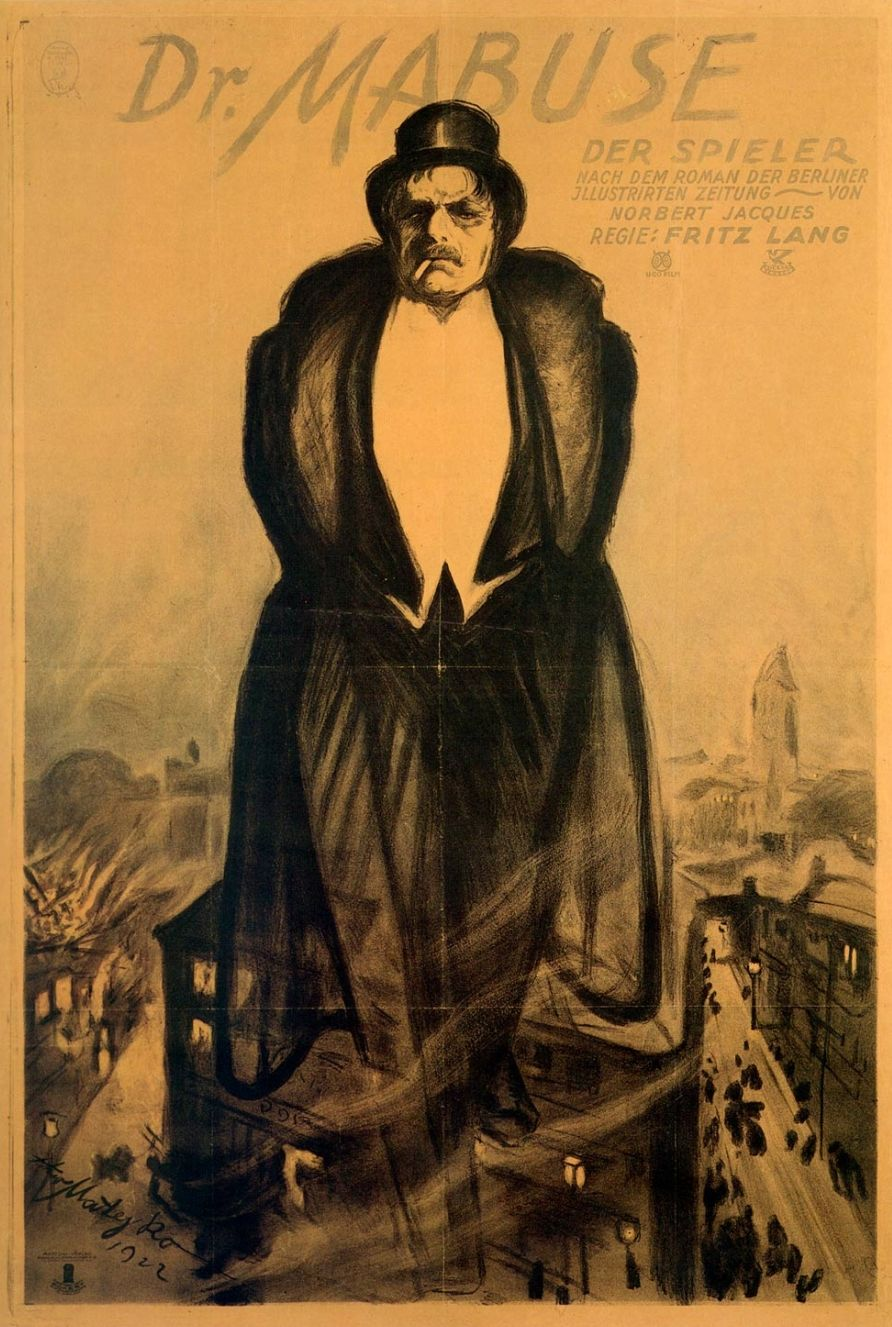
Dr. Mabuse, another literary figure of the cursed scientist, shown here on a poster for Fritz Lang's film Dr. Mabuse the Gambler (1922).

Scholar Luc Routeau posits that Septimus's countenance is a facade concealing his dual nature. Furthermore, he posits that the character's name is unambiguously significant. His first name, Jonathan, directly references a biblical figure, while his surname contains two semantic components: "Sept", a sacred number in numerology, and "mus", a Latin-Germanic ending that alludes to the "murky realm of occult knowledge" of the Middle Ages, as exemplified by the apothecary and astrologer Nostradamus, combine to form the name Septimus. Routeau posits that "Septimus unites in his name both perfection and sacrilegious knowledge, commanding the secrets of things; this linguistic conjunction of desecration and perfection inverts the symbol of the number. If Septimus possesses perfection, it is a perfection in evil." By creating the yellow "M", Dr. Septimus violates societal laws and the natural prohibition recognized by the group. He becomes the epitome of evil, joining the ranks of other literary and cinematic figures like Dr. Mabuse or Dr. Caligari, who are regarded as "cursed scientists."

Septimus is a figure of deception, as he employs his public persona as a facade for his private duality to enact his revenge. His duplicity is evidenced by a deception and a doubling, as he makes Olrik the instrument of his vengeance. In other words, he directly acts through his creature, using the "telecephaloscope", which becomes an extension of himself and ensures his impunity. Septimus's respectability and sociability are merely "carefully maintained appearances", concealing his true personality as a perverse scientist, creator of a "diabolical scheme." Routeau identifies this as a direct reference to Satanism, given that, in traditional Western depictions, Satanism is marked by duplicity.

=== Septimus and the control of images ===
In his analysis of The Yellow "M", literature professor Pierre Masson posits that the work represents "a demonstration that a particular worldview is incapable of controlling reality entirely." He further suggests that the album reflects "the distinction between nature and artifice running through Jacobs' work." In the author's universe, audiovisual media play a crucial role in providing protagonists with undeniable and decisive information, which contrasts with the approach taken by another major artist of his generation, Hergé, creator of The Adventures of Tintin. In The Yellow "M", for instance, through the television in Septimus's library, Blake becomes aware of Mortimer's presence in the doctor's clandestine laboratory. In this way, the visual sign is revealed to be a conduit of truth and influence over the tangible world.

However, the image is not reality itself. Ultimately, Dr. Septimus loses control over his creature because he attempts to use Olrik's gaze as a mere transmitting lens, thereby forgetting the value images hold for him. Upon entering Blake and Mortimer's apartment, Olrik is reminded of the enchantment he experienced in The Mystery of the Great Pyramid, which causes him to become "disoriented to the point of diverting him from Septimus's intended goal." Additionally, Masson posits that the external environment is merely a "reservoir of empty signs" to Septimus, who ascribes no significance to them other than that they convey a genuine message—his own. Masson suggests that this explains Septimus's compulsion to leave his mark everywhere, symbolizing his power (perhaps represented by the letter "m" in the context of the text?). Additionally, he exhibits a lack of regard for the objects he seizes, such as the royal crown, which represents the masses. Septimus deems this crown worthless and discards it in a hatbox. Dr. Septimus, who believes he can see remotely through the eyes of his creature, is, in fact, blind. This is because he regards visible reality as a blank page on which to imprint his name, as images without text, thus manipulable at his whim.

== Interpretations and legacy ==
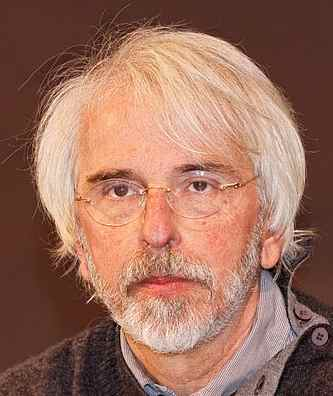
Writer Philippe Delerm declares his admiration for The Yellow "M"

In the 1950s, La Marque Jaune was adapted into a radio serial and subsequently released as a 33 RPM record, audio cassette, and CD. In this adaptation, actor Maurice Jacquemont provided the voice for the character of Dr. Septimus.

In the late 1970s, advertising executive Michel Marin devised a plan to adapt The Yellow "M" for the screen. Marin persuaded Jacobs to grant him an option on the album rights in December 1977. Producer Irène Silberman became involved in the project, which resulted in the filming of a pilot script by Jean Van Hamme in April 1983. The pilot episode starred Michel Vitold as Septimus, but the project was discontinued. In 1997, the narrative was adapted into an animated cartoon by Éric Rondeaux as part of the Blake and Mortimer animated series. In the episode, first broadcast on television on 26 April 1997, Jonathan Septimus was voiced by actor Hervé Bellon.

In December 1984, François Rivière and Francis Carin published a brief 14-panel narrative in a special edition of the Tintin magazine. This story, titled Edgar P. Jacobs in the Theater of Mystery, posits a scenario in which Jacobs, a former opera singer, became a comic book author. Several of his characters are featured, including Dr. Septimus, who is re-envisioned as Professor Adrianus. This character visits Jacobs's home to announce that he has been chosen as the "High Priest of Mystery." As such, he must use his illustrative abilities to contribute to this novel genre of comic art.

Furthermore, Dr. Septimus is referenced by author Philippe Delerm in Les Eaux troubles du mojito. Et autres belles raisons d'habiter sur terre (2015), in a chapter dedicated to The Yellow "M."

== Bibliography ==
=== Color albums ===
- Jacobs, Edgar P (2013). La Marque jaune [The Yellow "M"]. Hors Collection Blake & Mortimer (in French). Brussels: Dargaud. ISBN 9782870971703. Archived from the original on 18 April 2024.
- Dufaux, Jean; Aubin, Antoine; Schréder, Étienne (2013). L'Onde Septimus [Septimus Wave] (in French). Brussels: Éditions Blake et Mortimer. ISBN 978-2-8709-7189-5. Archived from the original on 25 February 2024.
- Dufaux, Jean; Cailleaux, Christian; Schréder, Étienne (2020). Le Cri du Moloch [Moloch's Cry] (in French). Brussels: Éditions Blake et Mortimer. ISBN 9782870972922. Archived from the original on 22 February 2024.
- Rivière, François; Harambat, Jean (2021). La Fiancée du Dr Septimus [The Bride of Dr Septimus]. Le nouveau chapitre (in French). Éditions Blake et Mortimer. ISBN 9782870972939. Archived from the original on 18 May 2024.

=== Books about Edgar P. Jacobs and his work ===
- Collectif (2014). Les personnages de Blake et Mortimer dans l'histoire: Les événements qui ont inspiré l'œuvre d'Edgar P. Jacobs [Blake and Mortimer characters in history: The events that inspired Edgar P. Jacobs' work] (in French). Paris: Historia, Le Point. ISBN 979-10-90956-25-4.
- Collectif (2020). La Marque jaune: Le chef-d'œuvre de Blake et Mortimer [The Yellow M: Blake and Mortimer's masterpiece] (in French). Paris: Les Cahiers de la BD. ISBN 979-1096119400.
- Collectif (2022). Les voyages de Blake et Mortimer: Deux aventuriers à travers le monde [Blake and Mortimer's travels: Two adventurers around the world]. Geo (in French). Prisma. ISBN 978-2-8104-3733-7.
- Mouchart, Benoît; Rivière, François (2021). Edgar P. Jacobs: Un pacte avec Blake et Mortimer [Edgar P. Jacobs: A pact with Blake and Mortimer] (in French). Brussels: Les Impressions nouvelles. ISBN 978-2-87449-890-9.
