= Blake and Mortimer (TV series) =

- Intertitle
- Created by: Edgar Pierre Jacobs (characters)
- Countries of origin: France; Canada
- No. of episodes: 26

Production
- Running time: 23 minutes (approx. per episode)
- Production company: Ellipse Animation

Original release
- Network: Canal+ France 3 M6
- Release: November 8, 1997 – July 11, 1998

Blake and Mortimer is an animated television series, based on the Blake and Mortimer comics series by Edgar Pierre Jacobs. The series was directed by Stéphane Bernasconi, and produced by French animation studio Ellipse, shown originally in 1997.

The first nine stories were used in this series, as well as four brand new stories, devised by the creators: The Viking's Bequest, The Secret of Easter Island, The Alchemist's Will, and The Druid. New writers, mostly connected to the production company as writers, dialogists or translators, were asked to come up with original plotlines which used the characters of Jacobs' stories, respected the magical/scientific Universe, but rang interesting changes.

== Episodes ==
1. "The Mystery of the Great Pyramid" – Part 1 (based on The Mystery of the Great Pyramid, Volume 1: Manetho's Papyrus)
2. "The Mystery of the Great Pyramid" – Part 2 (based on The Mystery of the Great Pyramid, Volume 2: The Chamber of Horus)
3. "The Yellow Mark" – Part 1 (based on The Yellow "M")
4. "The Yellow Mark" – Part 2
5. "Swordfish Versus Delta Red" – Part 1 (based on The Secret of the Swordfish)
6. "Swordfish Versus Delta Red" – Part 2
7. "The Atlantis Enigma" – Part 1 (based on Atlantis Mystery)
8. "The Atlantis Enigma" – Part 2
9. "Heavy Weather" – Part 1 (based on S.O.S. Meteors: Mortimer in Paris)
10. "Heavy Weather" – Part 2
11. "The Infernal Machine" – Part 1 (based on The Time Trap)
12. "The Infernal Machine" – Part 2
13. "The Ghost and the Necklace" – Part 1 (based on The Necklace Affair)
14. "The Ghost and the Necklace" – Part 2
15. "Professor Sató's Three Formulae" – Part 1 (based on Professor Sató's Three Formulae, Volume 1: Mortimer in Tokyo)
16. "Professor Sató's Three Formulae" – Part 2 (based on Professor Sató's Three Formulae, Volume 2: Mortimer vs. Mortimer)
17. "The Francis Blake Affair" – Part 1 (based on The Francis Blake Affair)
18. "The Francis Blake Affair" – Part 2
19. "The Viking's Bequest" – Part 1 (new)
20. "The Viking's Bequest" – Part 2
21. "The Secret of Easter Island" – Part 1 (new)
22. "The Secret of Easter Island" – Part 2
23. "The Alchemist's Will" – Part 1 (new)
24. "The Alchemist's Will" – Part 2
25. "The Druid" – Part 1 (new)
26. "The Druid" – Part 2

=== "The Viking's Bequest" ===
"The Viking's Bequest" (French: L'Heritage du Viking) was the first of four brand new stories in the animated television series. In this story, an Icelandic physicist has developed a geothermal energy process. She invites famed professionals to inspect her claims, including Blake, Mortimer and a disguised Olrik, who attempts to steal the new discovery. The British writer and (later) filmmaker Russell Craig Richardson wrote these episodes (as well as translating all 26 episodes for U.S. and Canadian release). Icelandic authenticity was aided by the collaboration of Thor Tulinius, the Reykjavik-based actor, playwright and theatre director.

== Home video ==
It was released on DVD in France (including English language options), and also in the UK in 2006 on a slim-lined DVD box-set.

== See also ==
- Carland Cross
- Night Hood
- The Adventures of Tintin
