= Blake and Mortimer =

Belgian comic series

The Adventures of Blake & Mortimer
- The cover of the English translation of the sixth book of the series, The Yellow "M"

Publication information
- Publisher: Tintin magazine Editions du Lombard; Editions Blake et Mortimer; Cinebook Ltd (in English)
- Genre: Science fiction Adventure
- Publication date: 1946–present
- Main character(s): Blake; Mortimer; Olrik

Creative team
- Created by: Edgar P. Jacobs
- Written by: Edgar P. Jacobs; Jean Van Hamme; Yves Sente
- Artist(s): Edgar P. Jacobs; Bob de Moor; Ted Benoît; André Juillard

The Adventures of Blake & Mortimer is a Belgian comics series created by writer and comics artist Edgar P. Jacobs. It was one of the first book series to appear in the Franco-Belgian comics magazine Tintin in 1946, and was subsequently published in book form by Belgian comic book publisher Le Lombard.

The main protagonists of the adventures are MI5 agent Captain Francis Blake, and his friend Professor Philip Mortimer, a leading British scientist. The books' recurring antagonist is the sworn enemy of the heroes, Colonel Olrik, who appears very frequently throughout the series, in almost every book. Their confrontations take them into the realms of detective investigation and science fiction, dealing with themes of time travel, historical events, and espionage.

Since Jacobs' death, many new titles of the series have been published by other authors, mainly two separate teams of artists and writers, with the amount of these new editions significantly dwarfing Jacobs' contributions. A television series based upon the series was produced in 1997, entitled Blake and Mortimer.

The books by Jacobs himself are generally set in the period of their writing, but those authored by others after his death are set mostly in the 1950s and 1960s.

== Main characters ==
The presence of the basis of the series' three main characters (looks, personality, attitudes) is apparent in Jacobs' unrelated, first full-length graphic novel, The U-Ray (1943), which predates the inception of this series. Here, their origins are left unspecified, and they are portrayed only as two proud Britons serving HM's Government.

They debut in the first books of the series' Francophone releases, the three-part story The Secret of the Swordfish, although the English language version of the series lists these titles as being books 15 to 17. They instead suggest, by designating this book as the first in the series, that they first appear in The Yellow 'M', although captions within the book contradict this.

The later, post-Jacobs title The Sarcophagi of the Sixth Continent provides insight into their early lives, and shows them making acquaintance – then beginning their friendship – during the time of the British Raj.

Colonel Olrik

Overviews of the main characters are as follows:

- Professor Philip Angus Mortimer – a seemingly archetypical British gentlemanly scholar, he is a leading physicist of Scottish descent, having grown up in colonial India and moved to England to attend university. His character is based upon a friend and occasional collaborator of Jacobs, Jacques Van Melkebeke, with the addition of a beard.
- Captain Francis Percy Blake – a Welsh-born officer in His Majesty's armed forces, he studied at Oxford University and later became head of the British Security Service MI5, and is currently still very active in the field. He is a master of disguise, even managing to fool Mortimer on occasion. Blake is modelled on another friend and occasional collaborator of Jacobs, Jacques Laudy, with the addition of a mustache.
- Colonel Olrik – the long-time, recurring villain from the first instalment onwards. Of the original series, only The Time Trap (Le Piège Diabolique) did not feature him in any capacity, and among the successive series, he has appeared in some capacity in every volume except The Oath of the Five Lords. Olrik's first appearance is in The Secret of the Swordfish, as the head of intelligence for Oriental dictator Basam Damdu. His roles have since ranged from mercenary, spy, smuggler and general criminal adventurer. He is characterised as a Westerner, but details such as his real name, birthplace and exact nationality are left unknown: in Plutarch's Staff, a post-Jacobs prequel to Secret of the Swordfish, Olrik is portrayed as a specialist in Slavic languages, and it is explained that he once fled Hungary, suggesting this as his country of origin. Olrik's appearance resembles that of Jacobs.
- Lieutenant Ahmed Nasir – the faithful friend and ally of the two heroes, and has British Indian Muslim (Pakistani) ancestry. His first appearance is in part one of The Secret of the Swordfish, where he prevents the two heroes from being captured by Olrik in Iran. He is a sergeant of the 5th Battalion of the "Makran Levy Corps" (Baluchistan), who previously served under Blake. Following his intervention, Nasir subsequently helps the two heroes in Egypt, then in London, ultimately becoming the butler of Professor Philip Mortimer. Nasir only appears in Jacobs' first books: The Secret of the Swordfish, The Mystery of the Great Pyramid, and The Yellow 'M'. His disappearance (corresponding to that of the British Empire's end) remains unexplained in later publications, however he eventually reappears many years later in The Sarcophagi of the Sixth Continent, created by Yves Sente and André Juillard. It is explained that following his resignation from the military, and his retirement from butler duties, he returned to India, where he joined their intelligence service.
- Jack – one of Olrik's most faithful henchmen, he wears thick, round glasses. He invariably takes the role of servant or housekeeper; however, he has partaken in numerous criminal acts under Olrik's orders, and attempted to assassinate Captain Blake at Athens airport in The Mystery of the Great Pyramid.
- Sharkey – a strong, albeit foolish, American henchman, another of Olrik's closest. He worked for Dr Grossgrabenstein as the above-ground regulator of his excavation site, but was simultaneously working with Olrik to eliminate Mortimer and prevent Blake from reaching Egypt in The Mystery of the Great Pyramid.
- Professor Jonathan Septimus – An eccentric physician and parapsychologist, he used to live in British-occupied Sudan where he discovered Olrik in a trance after the events of The Mystery of the Great Pyramid, proceeding to use him as a test subject for experiments into telepathy and telekinesis. His actions ultimately turned Olrik into the 'Yellow M'.
- Basam Damdu – Olrik's commander-in-chief and the absolute dictator of the Yellow Empire. A megalomaniac based on Adolf Hitler and Joseph Stalin, he is obsessed with ruling the world and is willing to destroy it rather than lose control of it.

Descriptions of more minor characters from the series are below:

- Glenn Kendall – the Chief Inspector of Scotland Yard. He assisted Blake and Mortimer in capturing the Yellow 'M' during The Yellow 'M', however was one of the most prominent antagonists in The Francis Blake Affair, where he endeavoured to arrest Blake on the grounds of high treason.
- Ahmed Rassim Bey – a prominent historian, curator of the Egyptian Museum. He invited Mortimer to Cairo to assist him in deciphering his mysterious discoveries concerning the Great Pyramid, however was betrayed by his assistant, Abdul, who informed Olrik of his discoveries. When Abdul's treachery was discovered, however, he assisted Mortimer in arresting the guilty parties. He is also friends with Doctor Grossgrabenstein.
- Abdul Ben Zaim – assistant to Ahmed Rassim Bey, he also worked at the Egyptian Museum, however was secretly Olrik's accomplice, stealing secret documents and copying Ahmed's finds on his orders. He was killed in a motor accident arranged by Olrik when he began to carelessly blunder their plot away in fear of retribution.
- Dr Grossgrabenstein – an eccentric Egyptologist, he invited Mortimer to accompany him to his excavation site on the Great Pyramid, where his presented his discoveries to him and showed him his collection. He was ambushed and imprisoned by Olrik, who wore a disguise impersonating the professor in an attempt to subjugate Mortimer, but was later freed in a battle to recapture his property.
- Superintendent Kamal – head of the Egyptian police force. A steadfast man with a serious, military, no-nonsense manner, he investigated Olrik's break-in of the Egyptian Museum, then worked with Mortimer to arrest the treacherous Abdul. On receiving a late-night telephone call from Mortimer, he and his officers invaded Youssef's antiques shop, then laid siege to the hotel hosting Olrik. He was the news-bearer of Abdul's death, and later launched an attack on Grossgrabenstein's property – at the time occupied by Olrik's gang – ultimately recapturing it and freeing Blake, Mortimer, and Nasir.
- Youssef Khadem – one of Olrik's henchmen, he owned an antiques shop, a rendezvous point for their gang. He fought against Mortimer when he came to his store, collaborating with the Bezendjas and Olrik to capture him. He possessed considerable knife-throwing skill, but was fatally wounded by police fire while attempting to flee from the scene.
- David Honeychurch – the deputy chief of MI5, he works for Blake. When Blake pretended to have become a traitor to England, Honeychurch was secretly on his side the entire time, deceiving his colleagues into believing the opposite. This was eventually discovered by Doyle-Smith and his minions, and he was imprisoned in Edinburgh Castle's dungeons, afterwards escaping and helping Blake and Mortimer to reclaim the property.
- Harold Doyle-Smith – under-secretary of state of the Home Office, he was in charge of coordinating various police forces. He was Blake's commanding minister, and after Blake's supposed treachery in The Francis Blake Affair, he became the Intelligence Service's acting minister. He inherited Ardmuir Castle following his uncle's death, lending it to Deloraine for a seminar, however betrayed its members by drugging them and attempting their kidnap. He was eventually discovered to have been working with Olrik's gang all along, informing Deloraine of results of discussions he attended within the Intelligence Service, and was arrested by SAS agents following their takeover of his property.
- Major Lachlan MacQuarrie – a 34-year-old penniless Scotsman of the 18th century and a maternal ancestor of Mortimer's, he was previously the career officer of the British Army, having served mostly overseas. Following his regiment's defeat by the Continental Army during the American War of Independence, he was abducted by 81st century humans, resulting in his declaration as a deserter and the loss of his military status. Remaining with them for several years, he studied their time travel principles, ultimately perishing in an attempt to return to his own time.
- Jimmy Tcheng – supposedly the Chinese-American assistant to Doctor Kaufman, he was really a disfigured future human in disguise. He cooperated with Mortimer and Kaufman to analyse the finds on MacQuarrie's body; however, after attempting to withhold a laser device discovered as part of the investigation, his betrayal was discovered by Mortimer, and following a car chase, he was killed in a tornado's onslaught.
- Dr Jeronimo Ramirez – a lively, bustling, eccentric Mexican–American physicist of the Los Alamos Nuclear Centre, he helped Mortimer discover and prevent Operation Poplar Trees, an attempt by Olrik and 81st century humans to start a nuclear holocaust and subjugate the Earth using Hydrogen bombs.
- Dr Walter Kaufman – director of the Unidentified Flying Object Studies section of the Centre for Spatial Studies in Topeka, Kansas. An eminent American scientist, he invited Mortimer over to investigate the discovery of Major MacQuarrie's body, and later helped him to prevent Operation Poplar Trees.
- John Calloway – a head FBI agent, he led his men in an attack on Basam Damdu's military base.
- Jessie Wingo – a half-Cheyenne FBI agent, she is Calloway's deputy. She rescued a drowning Mortimer from Olrik's clutches, and was subsequently part of an attack on him and Basam Damdu's military base. Shortly afterwards, she helped to prevent Operation Poplar Trees.
- Dimitri Voronov – a Soviet scientist and biologist during the Cold War's height, he conducted virology research and dabbled in biological warfare. A cold, calculating, ambitious figure, he opposed the current governing system of the Soviet Union, and hoped to seize control of Russia and reimplement Stalinist rule using Bacteria Z, a deadly virus he succeeded in extracting from a failed Soviet space mission. He went into hiding following his plan's failure and the arrest of Olrik, a key collaborator in his mission.
- Nastasia Wardynska – a female friend and ally of Blake and Mortimer with Russian heritage. Formerly a MI6 double agent planted in the USSR, she was imprisoned after her betrayal was discovered by Voronov, and then subsequently freed in exchange for Olrik during a prisoner swap. She is now a CSIR researcher, having been offered the role by Mortimer, and later journeyed with him to Africa.
- Professor Akira Satō – a Japanese cybernetician, he works for the Japanese Institute of Space and Astronautical Science. He has made numerous technological breakthroughs, succeeding in creating indistinguishably realistic androids and a flying machine in the image of a Japanese dragon – and, following the latter, he was betrayed by his assistant, Kim, in collaboration with Olrik's gang, who aimed to steal the findings of his research by obtaining three formulae held at banks across Tokyo.
- Commissioner Pradier – the Divisional Commissioner to the Paris Branch of Territorial Surveillance (DST), Pradier assists Blake and Mortimer during their adventures taking place in France. His physique was greatly inspired by the actor Jean Gabin.
- Sarah Summertown – a novelist-archaeologist, she is friends with both Blake and Mortimer. She and Mortimer first met during their youth in British colonial India, and it is strongly implied that, soon afterwards, they were briefly romantically involved. Later on, she, like Natasha, travelled with Mortimer to Africa in The Gondwana Shrine.
- Elizabeth McKenzie is a student in Cambridge, daughter of Sarah Summertown (and, it is slightly implied, Mortimer).
- Admiral Sir William Gray is the prime minister of the United Kingdom and first sea lord and chairman of the chiefs of staffs committee.
- Razul is a Bizenjo (known as Bezendjas) henchman of Olrik.
- Freddy is Sharkey's partner-in-crime.
- Professor Labrousse is an ally of Blake and Mortimer and meteorologist from Paris, France.
- Commander William Steele is chief of MI6.
- Mrs. Benson is Blake and Mortimer's landlady, a widow of Blake's former CO.
- Kim is a Korean scientist who is an assistant of Prof. Akira Sato and an informant for Olrik.

== Story characteristics ==
Although the series' title suggests a balance in appearance of the two characters, Mortimer is often the main protagonist, seen more frequently than Blake. In the original series, it is mainly he who, through his impulsive character, gets entangled in their adventures. In comparison, Blake is depicted as a serious, formal army officer who comes Mortimer's aid when necessary. Colonel Olrik, the main antagonist, displays a combination of the characteristics and personalities of both heroes, but his exploits are typically negative, ending with disastrous consequences.

Blake and Mortimer adventures are characterised by a quest, often involving undercover, secretive operations, ending with a heroic, liberated, or publicised ending. Furthermore, the structure of the books' storylines are often similar: in the beginning, certain unseen and significant events have already taken place – in The Yellow 'M', for instance, the antagonist of the story, 'Guinea Pig', has already committed various daring acts of theft on a grand scale, and readers only learn about this upon seeing Mortimer reading a newspaper. Also, the books often share comparable endings, with the protagonists reflecting on the wisdom they have acquired from their experiences: after returning from his time travel in The Time Trap, Mortimer concludes that rather than dwell on the 'good old days' or look forward to a 'brighter future', one should be content with the present.

Blake and Mortimer are frequently shown to be residing in a shared home, in adjacent apartments, the same manner as Sherlock Holmes and Doctor Watson. Many francophone comics share this basis of confirmed bachelors who live together, including Tintin and Captain Haddock, Asterix & Obelix, Spirou & Fantasio, and Tif & Tondu. These series were all first published during a time when the censorship of youth publications was very heavily enforced and stringent, and male/female segregation was rigorously policed.

The settings of many of Jacobs' stories are contemporary, based on real-world events and environments, and as such the first few titles of the series present a look and feel reminiscent of the 1950s, while later instalments showcase a political climate comparable to the 1970s. One exception to this rule is, once again, The Time Trap, starring in the present (i.e. early 1960s) but with its action, caused by a sabotaged time machine, largely takes place in the 51st century – a brief venture in medieval times and a stopover in the Jurassic period also take place. Post-Jacobs stories are, so far, integrated into the chronology of the earlier books, or precede it, taking place in the 1940s, 1950s, and 1960s.

Jacobs' art style, although typical of the Belgian comics drawings (known as 'clear line' or 'ligne claire'), is notable for its extensive use of light colours and its containment of scenes similar to those found in film production (the panoramic view over night-time London featured as the opening scene in The Yellow 'M' being a good example of this).

Conversely, the series' writing is noted for its high verbosity, such as in The Yellow 'M', which contains a page sporting over 900 words. Captions and word balloons also appear frequently, describing action being depicted visually.

== Publication history ==
=== Under Edgar P. Jacobs ===
With the launch of the Tintin magazine, which showcased books from The Adventures of Tintin series, it included the story The Secret of the Swordfish, introducing the characters of Blake, Mortimer, and Olrik to wider audiences.

The production of these instalments of the series ended in 1949, but the publication of further stories concerning the characters' exploits continued for many years, only ending with the death of the series' creator. Books penned and illustrated by him saw the two heroes go on adventures ranging from the lost city of Atlantis to the catacombs of Paris.

After Jacobs' death in 1987, Bob de Moor completed his last story, left unfinished following the incident.

=== Following Jacobs' death ===
From 1987, the Jacobs estate, centred on the still operational Jacobs Studios, republished all of Jacobs' works.

In the 1990s, after much debate about stories' authenticity, Dargaud got permission to revive the series, including the creation and publication of new stories by a newly recruited team of writers and illustrators, published as further instalments in the series. These books are still firmly set in the middle-to-late 20th century, and include many new regular supporting characters, most notably Blake's colleagues in the security services. Much of the new additions are of the creation of two separate teams of authors, Van Hamme/Benoit and Sente/Juillard.

The first of these, The Francis Blake Affair, was published in 1996. Its storyline was provided by famous scenarist Jean Van Hamme, and specialist draughtsman Ted Benoit (whose Ligne claire drawing style resembles that of the late Jacobs') was contracted for the artwork. Purists, partial to the original plotlines of those penned by Jacobs, immediately objected to the choice of Van Hamme and, upon publication, went on to discover the feature of some of his typically trademark plot twists, taking an instant dislike to his contribution. The elements of science fiction, prominent in earlier books by Jacobs', were noticeably absent from this new addition, which contained a strong focus on espionage. Despite the negative reception and criticism it faced, the book was a relative success, and the publisher decided to continue the line. During this time, both Benoit and Van Hamme became engaged on other projects, and their commitments caused a delay in the production of the series' next instalment.

As an interim solution, writer Yves Sente and artist André Juillard were contracted to publish another adventure, The Voronov Plot (1998) containing prevalent themes of the Cold War.

Later on, Van Hamme and Benoit completed work on their book, The Strange Encounter, which appeared in 2001, and concerns the heroes' confrontation of mysterious alien creatures.

This was followed by the publication of Sente and Juillard's two-part adventure The Sarcophagi of the Sixth Continent (Part 1: The Global Threat, in 2003; Part 2: Battle of the Spirits, in 2004) which deals with Blake and Mortimer's youth, and the beginning of their friendship upon their first meeting in pre-independence India.

In 2008, Sente and Juillard also released another book in the series, The Gondwana Shrine, chronologically following the events of the previous two volumes, The Sarcophagi of the Sixth Continent parts 1 and 2.

The series' next adventure, a two-parter titled The Curse of the 30 Pieces of Silver, was written by Jean Van Hamme. The first book, The Manuscript of Nicodemus, was illustrated by René Sterne, whose sudden death occurred on the 15th of November 2006, and which delayed the instalments' publication. Sterne's girlfriend, Chantal De Spiegeleer, eventually completed his work, which was published on the 20th of November 2009. Aubin Frechon illustrated the adventure's second volume, published on the 26th of November 2010.

== List of titles ==
#	Title		Release date	Story	Art
1	The Secret of the Swordfish	Part 1: The Incredible Chase	1950	Edgar P. Jacobs	Edgar P. Jacobs
2	The Secret of the Swordfish	Part 2: Mortimer's Escape	1953	Edgar P. Jacobs	Edgar P. Jacobs
3	The Secret of the Swordfish	Part 3: SX1 Strikes Back	1984†	Edgar P. Jacobs	Edgar P. Jacobs
4	The Mystery of the Great Pyramid	Part 1: The Papyrus of Manethon	1954	Edgar P. Jacobs	Edgar P. Jacobs
5	The Mystery of the Great Pyramid	Part 2: The Chamber of Horus	1955	Edgar P. Jacobs	Edgar P. Jacobs
6	The Yellow 'M'		1956	Edgar P. Jacobs	Edgar P. Jacobs
7	Atlantis Mystery		1957	Edgar P. Jacobs	Edgar P. Jacobs
8	S.O.S. Meteors		1959	Edgar P. Jacobs	Edgar P. Jacobs
9	The Time Trap		1962	Edgar P. Jacobs	Edgar P. Jacobs
10	The Affair of the Necklace		1967	Edgar P. Jacobs	Edgar P. Jacobs
11	Professor Satō's; Three Formulae	Part 1: Mortimer in Tokyo	1977	Edgar P. Jacobs	Edgar P. Jacobs
12	Professor Satō's; Three Formulae	Part 2: Mortimer versus Mortimer	1990	Edgar P. Jacobs	Bob de Moor
13	The Francis Blake Affair		1996	Jean Van Hamme	Ted Benoit
14	The Voronov Plot		2000	Yves Sente	André Juillard
15	The Strange Encounter		2001	Jean Van Hamme	Ted Benoit
16	The Sarcophagi of the Sixth Continent	Part 1: The Global Threat	2003	Yves Sente	André Juillard
17	The Sarcophagi of the Sixth Continent	Part 2: Battle of the Spirits	2004	Yves Sente	André Juillard
18	The Gondwana Shrine		2008	Yves Sente	André Juillard
19	The Curse of the 30 Pieces of Silver	Part 1: The Scroll of Nicodemus	2009	Jean Van Hamme	René Sterne & Chantal De Spiegeleer
20	The Curse of the 30 Pieces of Silver	Part 2: The Gate of Orpheus	2010	Jean Van Hamme	Antoine Aubin & Étienne Schréder
21	The Oath of the Five Lords		2012	Yves Sente	André Juillard
22	The Septimus Wave		2013	Jean Dufaux	Antoine Aubin & Étienne Schréder
23	Plutarch's Staff		2015	Yves Sente	André Juillard
24	The Testament of William S.		2016	Yves Sente	André Juillard
25	The Valley of the Immortals	Part 1: Threat Over Hong Kong	2018	Yves Sente	Peter van Dongen & Teun Berserik
26	The Valley of the Immortals	Part 2: The Thousandth Arm of the Mekong	2019	Yves Sente	Peter van Dongen & Teun Berserik
SE	The Last Pharaoh		2019	Jaco Van Dormael & Thomas Gunzig	Francois Schuiten & Laurent Durieux
27	The Call of the Moloch		2020	Jean Dufaux	Christian Cailleaux & Etienne Schreder
28	The Last Swordfish		2021	Jean Van Hamme	Peter van Dongen & Teun Berserik
29	Eight Hours in Berlin		2022	Jean-Luc Fromental & Jose-Luis Bocquet	Antoine Aubin
SE	The Art of War		2023	Jean-Luc Fromental & Jose-Luis Bocquet	Jean-Claude Floch
30	Signed “Olrik”		2024	Yves Sente	André Juillard
31	Threat from Atlantis		2025	Yves Sente	Peter van Dongen

Additionally, the Jacobs' storyboard sketches of Book 12 (Part 2 of Professor Satō's Three Formulae), left incomplete following his death, have been re-issued in 1996 outside of the series as Dossier Mortimer contre Mortimer (ISBN 2-87097-022-6).

† The Secret of the Swordfish originally consisted of two parts. In 1984, it was republished in three.

== Translations ==
=== English ===
Like many Franco-Belgian comics, English translation publications of Blake and Mortimer were initially limited.

==== Blake and Mortimer Editions ====
Les Editions Blake and Mortimer, aka The Blake and Mortimer Editions, published English translations of the three parts of The Secret of the Swordfish in 1986, both parts of The Mystery of the Great Pyramid in 1987, and The Yellow 'M' in 1988.

==== Comcat ====
Catalan Communications, under its 'Comcat' line of books, published two books in inexpensive trade paperback copies in the US. They released:

1. The Time Trap (Le Piège diabolique) (1989) ISBN 0-87416-066-9
2. Atlantis Mystery (L'Énigme de l'Atlantide) (1990) ISBN 0-87416-094-4

There were also plans to release both parts of The Mystery of the Great Pyramid, and The Yellow 'M', however Catalan collapsed financially before they could be realised.

==== Cinebook Ltd ====
Cinebook Ltd has been publishing English language translations of Blake and Mortimer since 2007. The following volumes have been released to date:

1. The Yellow 'M' (published January 2007) ISBN 978-1-905460-21-2
2. The Mystery of the Great Pyramid, Part 1: The Papyrus of Manethon (published November 2007) ISBN 978-1-905460-37-3
3. The Mystery of the Great Pyramid, Part 2: The Chamber of Horus (published January 2008) ISBN 978-1-905460-38-0
4. The Francis Blake Affair (published September 2008) ISBN 978-1-905460-63-2
5. The Strange Encounter (published January 2009) ISBN 978-1-905460-75-5
6. S.O.S. Meteors (published September 2009) ISBN 978-1-905460-97-7
7. The Affair of the Necklace (published January 2010) ISBN 978-1-84918-037-5
8. The Voronov Plot (published October 2010) ISBN 978-1-84918-048-1
9. The Sarcophagi of the Sixth Continent, Part 1: The Global Threat (published January 2011) ISBN 1-84918-067-9
10. The Sarcophagi of the Sixth Continent, Part 2: Battle of the Spirits (published April 2011) ISBN 978-1-84918-077-1
11. The Gondwana Shrine (published September 2011) ISBN 978-1-84918-094-8
12. Atlantis Mystery (published January 2012) ISBN 978-1-84918-107-5
13. The Curse of the 30 Pieces of Silver, Part 1: The Scroll of Nicodemus (published April 2012) ISBN 978-1-84918-125-9
14. The Curse of the 30 Pieces of Silver, Part 2: The Gate of Orpheus (published August 2012) ISBN 978-1-84918-130-3
15. The Secret of the Swordfish, Part 1: The Incredible Chase (published February 2013) ISBN 9781849181488
16. The Secret of the Swordfish, Part 2: Mortimer's Escape (published June 2013) ISBN 9781849181617
17. The Secret of the Swordfish, Part 3: SX1 Strikes Back (published October 2013) ISBN 9781849181747
18. The Oath of the Five Lords (published March 2014) ISBN 9781849181914
19. The Time Trap (published September 2014) ISBN 9781849182140
20. The Septimus Wave (published February 2015) ISBN 9781849182423
21. Plutarch's Staff (published September 2015) ISBN 9781849182645
22. Professor Satō's Three Formulae, Part 1: Mortimer in Tokyo (published February 2016) ISBN 9781849182928
23. Professor Satō's Three Formulae, Part 2: Mortimer versus Mortimer (published May 2016) ISBN 9781849183031
24. The Testament of William S. (published April 2017) ISBN 9781849183390
25. The Valley of Immortals, Part 1: Threat Over Hong Kong (published April 2019) ISBN 9781849184281
26. The Valley of Immortals, Part 2: The Thousandth Arm of the Mekong (published March 2020) ISBN 9781849184373
27. The Call of the Moloch (published March 2021) ISBN 9781849185974
28. The Last Swordfish (published May 2022) ISBN 9781800440494
29. Eight Hours in Berlin (published Dec 2022) ISBN 9781800440852
30. Signed, Olrik (published December 2025) ISBN 9781800441682
31. Threat from Atlantis (published September 2026) ISBN 9781800441958

Further volumes to be translated:

- The Last Pharaoh (TBC)
- The Art of War (TBC)

Others:

1. Before Blake & Mortimer: The U Ray (published Sept 2023) ISBN 9781800441057
2. Before Blake & Mortimer: The Fiery Arrow (published March 2024) ISBN 9781800440951

== Adaptations ==
=== Radio series ===
The Time Trap was adapted into a radio play in 1962.

=== Animated series ===
In 1997, Ellipse animation studios made an animated series containing 26 episodes, making up 13 stories, four of which were entirely new and not based on existing books.

=== Film ===
Several prior attempts were made to adapt The Yellow M to film. Spanish director Álex de la Iglesia stated that he was working on an adaptation of the comic to be released around 2010, however this never came into fruition. At one point, surrounding rumours claimed that Hugh Laurie and Kiefer Sutherland were to play Blake and Mortimer respectively; Since then, however, nothing has come of this project.

In April 2024, it was announced that Belga Films would produce a live-action English-language film based on The Yellow M, with Cedric Nicolas-Troyan directing. In May 2025, Corey Mylchreest and Phil Dunster were cast as Blake and Mortimer. The film will shoot in the UK and Belgium in September 2025.

=== Games ===
In 2014, French publisher Ystari Games released the deduction and social table top board game Blake & Mortimer: Witness.

In 2011, French publishers Dargaud and Anuman Interactive launched the first video game adaptation of the Blake and Mortimer series, titled Blake and Mortimer: The Curse of the Thirty Denarii, a hidden objects game featuring both 3D and comic-strip environments.

=== Murals ===
In 2005, as part of the Brussels' Comic Book Route, a wall was designed in the Rue du Houblon/Hopstraat in Brussels, a reproduction of the one featured on the cover of The Yellow 'M'. It was designed by G. Oreopoulos and D. Vandegeerde.

=== Parodies ===
The main characters of Blake and Mortimer have made cameo appearances in various comic series, particularly those series that are set in the same period of history, the twilight of the British Empire. They are often a tribute to their creator, Edgar P. Jacobs.

For example, they make a one-off appearance in the Valérian adventure On the False Earths when the hero visits a Victorian London club.

Another example is the popular Belgian comic series concerning the adventures of MI5 agent Colonel Clifton. Clifton once featured in a story entitled Jade, published in 2003. In it he meets two characters called Blake and Mortimer, though even as caricatures they bear little resemblance (perhaps deliberately) to Jacob's originals. The story includes elements from the original books, such as the entrance to the secret passage from S.O.S. Météores and the cave that doubles as a submarine base in L'Affaire Francis Blake.

In 2005, Dargaud published a parody entitled Menaces sur l'Empire ("The Empire Under Threat"). This was a humorous presentation of the adventures of Blake and Mortimer and was not part of the canon (in fact, the space reserved for the series' title reads "Les Aventures de Philip et Francis" as opposed to "Les Aventures de Blake et Mortimer"). The jokes contained include:

- Mortimer's attempts to break his diet, which his Indian manservant always thwarts, even from a long distance
- Confusion over whether they are working for MI5 or MI6
- The heroes catching Prime Minister Winston Churchill in bed, engaged in an affair with a young woman
- A send-up of Bruce Lee's Game of Death

Two additional volumes of "Les Aventures de Philip et Francis" have followed, Le Piège machiavélique (2011) and S.O.S. Météo (2014).

Tigresse Blanche (White Tigress) by Yann and Conrad is another Belgian comic series featuring the adventures of a Chinese Communist woman spy in post-World War II China. It features a British agent, Sir Francis Flake, whose friend (based on Mortimer) gets drunk on the announcement of Indian independence.

== See also ==
- Le Monde's 100 Books of the Century
- The Adventures of Tintin
