= The Yellow "M" =

Comic book by Edgar P. Jacobs

The Yellow “M” (La Marque Jaune)
- Cover of the English language (Cinebook) edition
- Date: 1956
- Series: Blake and Mortimer
- Publisher: Les Éditions Blake et Mortimer (Dargaud-Lombard)

Creative team
- Writers: Edgar P. Jacobs
- Artists: Edgar P. Jacobs

Original publication
- Published in: Tintin magazine
- Issues: 256 to 322
- Date of publication: 6 August 1953 to 3 November 1954
- Language: French
- ISBN: 2-87097-010-2

Translation
- Publisher: Cinebook Ltd
- Date: 2007
- ISBN: 978-1-905460-21-2
- Translator: Clarence E. Holland

Chronology
- Preceded by: The Mystery of the Great Pyramid Volume 2: The Chamber of Horus
- Followed by: Atlantis Mystery

The Yellow "M" (French: La Marque Jaune ("The Yellow Mark")) by the Belgian artist Edgar P. Jacobs is the sixth comic book in the Blake and Mortimer series. It was first published in Tintin magazine between 6 August 1953 and 3 November 1954 and later appeared in book form in 1956.

== Plot ==
For some time now London has been terrorized by an enigmatic villain who informs the press in advance of his crimes. He commits daring robberies and leaves behind an "M" in a yellow circle as a signature. When the Imperial State Crown is stolen from the Tower of London, the Home Office assigns Captain Francis Blake to assist Chief Inspector Glenn Kendall of Scotland Yard. Blake in turn calls in his old friend and housemate, Professor Philip Mortimer, who has been on holiday to Scotland but agrees to return to London to help in the enquiry.

Meeting Blake at the Centaur Club, Mortimer is also introduced to some of its regulars: Leslie Macomber, editor of the Daily Mail; Sir Hugh Calvin, judge at the Central Criminal Court; Professor Robert Vernay of the British Medical Association; and Dr Jonathan Septimus of the Psychiatric Institute. Following dinner the group breaks up with Vernay and Septimus electing to walk home. On the way Septimus feels uneasy and calls a taxi, leaving Vernay alone. Shortly afterwards, Vernay is abducted by the Yellow "M".

The following night Macomber is kidnapped from his office at the Daily Mail. In spite of the judge's objections, Kendall insists on staying the night at the Calvin residence as a precaution. This is to no avail: Calvin disappears and Kendall is later found unconscious and with no recollection of what happened, a common occurrence with those who have confronted the Yellow "M" head-on. Blake and Mortimer meanwhile receive several messages telling them to stay away from the case and the symbol of the Yellow "M" even appears on the back of Blake's overcoat.

The Yellow "M" announces that there will be yet another kidnapping and the terrified Septimus is convinced that he is next. He agrees with Blake's suggestion that he leave London. Taking a train from King's Cross with two police detectives, their journey is unexpectedly stopped. Blake goes to investigate but, returning to their compartment, discovers Septimus has disappeared. As he and the policemen search the area, their train suddenly collides with the Harwich Express and is derailed.

Meanwhile, Mortimer is at the archives of the Daily Mail where, with the help of Mr Stone the archivist, he is conducting his own research into the affair. He comes across the case of The Mega Wave, a book written many years ago by a certain Doctor J. Wade about aspects of the human brain. Wade theorised that a part of the brain, which he called the Mega Wave, could be used to turn people into docile and powerful beings and even be manipulated by others. James Thornley, the publisher, instigated libel action against scathing press articles attacking the book and its conclusions. Macomber, Calvin, Vernay and Septimus were all involved in the court proceedings and Thornley suddenly died of apoplexy when he lost the case. Mortimer goes to the British Museum to find a copy of The Mega Wave only to discover that it has been stolen by the Yellow "M". He returns home to inform Blake of his discoveries and they agree to look into it further.

That night a mysterious masked figure breaks into Blake and Mortimer's house. Awoken, the occupants confront the intruder but he is resistant to bullets and Nasir the manservant is knocked unconscious when he attempts to seize him. The intruder escapes into the night. Blake and Mortimer then discover a listening device hidden in their living room.

Later that day Blake receives a letter from Septimus begging him to go to Limehouse Dock where someone will give him vital information regarding the case. It's clearly a trap, but Blake elects to go anyway with Kendall and the police providing discreet support. After Blake has left, Mortimer is visited by Stone from the Daily Mail who has found a copy of The Mega Wave which was sent to the paper for review when first published. Mortimer reads through the complex book and something in it makes him realise that Blake is in terrible danger.

At the docks, the Yellow "M" makes an unsuccessful attempt to kill Blake. The police give chase but, despite being shot at, falling into the river, crashing his car and catching fire, the Yellow "M" still manages to escape, apparently unharmed.

Arriving at the scene by taxi, Mortimer stays on the Yellow "M"'s trail, following him into the sewers where he finds the mystery man's secret lair. There he comes across an impressive laboratory where he sees none other than Septimus questioning the Yellow "M" over his recent failures regarding Blake and Mortimer—which he is unable to explain. When the Yellow "M"'s cumbersome headgear is removed, Mortimer is astonished to recognise his old enemy Olrik, but the man who was once a ruthless adventurer, gang leader and master criminal now appears to be nothing more than a pathetic slave in a state of hypnosis under Septimus' control.

Once Olrik has been sent to get some rest, Mortimer confronts Septimus at gunpoint only for the latter to use a spinning disk on his head that hypnotises Mortimer and makes him unconscious. Now prisoner, Mortimer listens as Septimus explains how he was the writer of The Mega Wave (using the pseudonym Wade) and how the theories it put forward were the subject of ridicule by Macomber and Vernay in the press, who saw it as both nonsense and harmful to the public. When his publisher Thornley instigated libel proceedings, Judge Calvin was equally critical, describing it as "scientific heresy". This resulted in Thornley's death while Septimus, who had defended the book in court without revealing himself as the author, left, gutted, for Sudan.

In Africa he met a white madman found wandering the desert and decided to use him as a guinea-pig in order to try out his theories on the Mega Wave and get his revenge. In time he invented a machine called the Telecephaloscope which enables him to gain control over a subject's Mega Wave and thus manipulate them from a distance. He can even see what the subject sees through a TV screen - the subject's eyes acting as cameras relating to the brain which passes the images on to the Telecephaloscope.

Septimus is still unaware that Pig, the name he gave to his subject, is Olrik, the infamous adventurer, driven almost completely amnesiac due to the events surrounding the mystery of the Great Pyramid. Septimus concedes that he cannot control the subject's subconscious and Mortimer privately theorises that this would explain the Yellow "M"'s failures regarding him and Blake, since events in their confrontations subconsciously reminded Olrik of his past battles with them even if he was not actually aware of it.

Using the technology in his lair, Septimus jams the BBC Television signal, announcing that the Yellow "M" will execute Mortimer in the morning. The officers at Scotland Yard are able to triangulate the source of the signal and begin to search the area. Septimus then proceeds to kidnap a number of prominent Harley Street doctors who are taken prisoner to his hide-out. There he puts on a show of Macomber, Vernay and Calvin, their minds under his control, falling on their knees and "begging" forgiveness for their attacks on him and his theories.

Blake learns about Stone taking to Mortimer a copy of The Mega Wave and guesses that this is what led his friend to Limehouse. A reward is issued for the return of the book and the taxi driver who took Mortimer to the docks finds it in his cab. He gives it to Blake and Kendall. The book includes a dedication and they recognise Septimus' handwriting. Realising that he is the mastermind behind the Yellow "M", they lead a raid on his house. Septimus is about to kill Mortimer when the latter breaks the doctor's hold over Olrik by repeating the spell cast on him that caused him to lose his memories (meanwhile, Mortimer remembering the magic phrase of Razek launched Olrik face and destabilized, a "For Horus remains"). Suddenly going mad, Olrik turns against Septimus, chases him into the laboratory and uses a machine that vaporises the scientist.

Olrik recovers his memories and his personality. He recognises Mortimer and is about to take on his enemy when Blake and the police arrive and he is forced to flee. Septimus' death has also restored Calvin, Vernay and Macomber to normal and the Harley Street doctors are freed. Mortimer hands over to Kendall the stolen Imperial Crown.

Blake concludes that although Septimus and his exceptional skills could have led him to be seen as one of the greatest scientists of the age, ego and the desire for revenge diverted him from his original goals and led to his downfall. Thus his death should be seen as a warning to others that science is there to help mankind in general and not serve the tyrannical ambitions of a single individual.

== Reception ==
The Yellow "M" is generally regarded as a classic and the cover has achieved iconic status among European comics fans.

== Connections to other books ==
- In Jacobs' later The Time Trap, Mortimer comes across an article from the 22nd century which erroneously credits him with the creation of Septimus' Telecephaloscope.
- In the post-Jacobs books written and drawn by various authors and artists, Chief Inspector Glenn Kendall reappears in both The Francis Blake Affair and The Voronov Plot; the latter also includes Calvin, Vernay and Macomber dining together at the Centaur Club.
- In The Strange Encounter, Mortimer mentions the events of the Yellow "M", Septimus and the Mega Wave as part of explaining the function of a strange alien weapon which also affects the brain.
- In 2005 Dargaud published a parody entitled Menaces sur l'Empire ("The Empire Under Threat") which was a humorous presentation of the adventures of Blake and Mortimer and certainly not part of the canon. One scene included an almost panel-by-panel re-enactment of the Yellow "M" discreetly breaking into Blake and Mortimer's house. In this case however the heavily disguised intruder turns out to be Mortimer himself, making a desperate attempt to obtain a chicken from the fridge but being thwarted at gunpoint by Nasir who stands by his orders to enforce his master's diet by all means necessary.
- In The Septimus Wave, Olrik deals with his experiences under Septimus.

== Adaptation attempts ==
Several attempts have been made to make films of The Yellow "M", though none have been successful.

Jean Van Hamme, a writer who has written additional "Blake and Mortimer" adventures, tells of how movie producer Irene Silberman, wife of Serge Silberman, actually filmed a scene for a potential movie which lasted three minutes. Jacobs was present at the screening of this trial and Van Hamme, who was also there, tells of his enthusiasm for the project. However the film never got off the ground and Silberman lost the movie rights to the story.

Spanish director Álex de la Iglesia claimed that he was working on an adaptation of the comic to be released around 2010. It had also been said that Hugh Laurie and Kiefer Sutherland will be Blake and Mortimer, but no news has come of this since then.

The story was turned into an animated cartoon as part of the Blake and Mortimer TV series made in the late 1990s.

== English publication ==
The Yellow "M" was first published in English by Les Éditions Blake and Mortimer in 1988. It was later issued by Cinebook Ltd in January 2007.
