= The Curse of the Thirty Denarii =

The Curse of the Thirty Denarii (La malédiction des trente deniers)
- Cover to the French-language edition of Volume 2
- Date: 20 November 2009
- Series: Blake and Mortimer

Creative team
- Writers: Jean Van Hamme
- Artists: René Sterne/Chantal De Spiegeleer, Antoine Aubin/Etienne Schreder

Original publication
- Language: French

Translation
- Publisher: Cinebook Ltd
- Date: 2012
- ISBN: 978-1-84918-125-9
- Translator: Jerome Saincantin

Chronology
- Preceded by: The Gondwana Shrine
- Followed by: The Oath of the Five Lords

The Curse of the Thirty Denarii is the nineteenth Blake and Mortimer book in the series. The story was written by Jean Van Hamme. Its completion was delayed with the death of the artist, René Sterne, on 15 November 2006. The book was completed by Sterne's girlfriend Chantal De Spiegeleer and was released on 20 November 2009.

It is a two-part installment containing "The Manuscript of Nicodemus" (Le manuscrit de Nicodemus) as part 1 and "The Gate of Orpheus" (La porte d'Orphée) as part 2. It tells of the search for the 30 pieces of silver paid to Judas Iscariot for his betrayal of Jesus.

== Plot ==
=== Volume I ===
Following an earthquake in the South of the Peloponnese, a shepherd boy discovered the remains of a fifth-century Christian chapel. There are ancient manuscripts and a lead reliquary. Two weeks later, in Jacksonville, Pennsylvania, a commando helicopter breaks out Colonel Olrik from a high-security prison. The same night, in London, Captain Francis Blake, head of MI5, is made aware of this spectacular escape and goes to the United States to help the FBI track Olrik down, while his friend Professor Philip Mortimer receives a letter from Doctor Géorgios Markopoulos, curator of the Archaeological Museum of Athens, asking for his help on an extraordinary case.

A few days later, Olrik wakes aboard the Arax where he finds his lackey, Jack. The owner of the yacht, the wealthy businessman Belos Beloukian, wants to hire him for a case that opposes Mortimer. At the same time, Mortimer lands in Athens where he is greeted by Eleni Philippides, the niece and assistant to Dr. Markopoulos. While they drive to the Museum, a thug gets a flat tire from the car of Eleni to delay. But the impromptu arrival of Jim Radcliff, correspondent for the Philadelphia Chronicle (parody of Philadelphia Inquirer) and engaged to Eleni, allows them to hit the road. In the Museum, they discover the unconscious Dr. Markopoulos in his office and an individual masked fleeing with a metal box. Mortimer begins a pursuit of the Lincoln of the two thieves until a thunderstorm suddenly causes an accident in the car. The Professor retrieves the box as well as a stater of the reign of the Emperor Tiberius, putting immediately an end to the storm, then returns to the Museum. Meanwhile, at the headquarters of the FBI in Washington, Blake is meeting with John Calloway, Chief of special operations, and his assistant, Jessie Wingo. They have traced the origin of the helicopters of the escape of Olrik until a certain Belos Beloukian, wealthy Armenian businessman and so-called former prisoner of war. However, they suspect him to be Colonel Count Rainer von Stahl of SS-Totenkopfverbände whose fortune would be the Nazi war chest.

In Athens, Dr. Markopoulos explains to Mortimer the reason for his coming: he fell in possession of manuscripts indicating that in the 1st century a.d., the leader of a Christian congregation in Greece, named Nicodemus, had met Judas Iscariot, who survived his suicide attempt mentioned in the Bible. On his death, he would have sent one of his faithful to bury him with his 30 pieces of silver in a place unknown to all. But one of the coins affected by the curse of God would have been preserved in a lead reliquary, crossing the centuries until its discovery in the chapel. At that time, the two men are being targeted by a shooter, but they come out unscathed. The Inspector Kamantis tells them that it's Kostas, the survivor of the accident of the Lincoln who wants to avenge his brother's death. On board the Arax, Beloukian confesses to Olrik he wants the purse of Judas for the destructive power and to become the master of evil on Earth.

In Museum, Eleni says Mortimer is missing a manuscript indicating the place of the congregation of Nicodemus. Mortimer then decides to return to search the chapel with her. At night, Kostas triggers the hotel fire alarm and, disguised as a policeman, isolates Mortimer in a service staircase in order to kill him, but Mortimer manages to narrowly escape. The Inspector Kamantis is highly advised to leave the city for safety, and in the early morning, Mortimer, Jim and Eleni take a train to the South of the Peloponnese. During the trip, Eleni and Mortimer discuss theories on the origin of the name of Judas the Iscariot. Meanwhile, on a small island in Mediterranean, Olrik enters in a room decorated with a large Nazi swastika where Beloukian chairs a meeting vowing to become the masters of the world. Beloukian then confesses to be Colonel Count Rainer von Stahl and hired him as head of the service of information and security, as it did to Basam Damdu. As a token of his resolution, Olrik kills Kostas on order of Rainer von Stahl.

After vainly searching the Chapel, Mortimer and Eleni visit a young shepherd, but Olrik and Jack are already on the spot and escape with the manuscript. Mortimer begins pursuing them with two compatriots until they are blocked in the village by a herd of sheep. Mortimer catches Olrik and take the manuscript, but Jack arrives and is about to kill him when Jim comes in and puts him to flight. Mortimer warns Blake of the presence of Olrik in Greece and finds Eleni who tells their next destination: the island of Syrenios. To get there, Jim offers to use the yacht from the owner of his newspaper, Belos Beloukian, who turns out to know all of their adventures. But on board, Mortimer falls on Olrik and is made prisoner, as Eleni, Jim and Dr. Markopoulos. During the night, the Professor manages to escape the ship with a lifeboat, but it is a trap from Olrik, who removed out the oars and the food.

=== Volume II ===
Mortimer drifts for several days at sea until he is saved by a seaplane with on board Blake, John Calloway, Jessie Wingo and a commando of the MI6. They find the yacht of Beloukian in anchorage off the coast of Syrenios island in the sea of Crete. In the evening, they board it, but it's a trap and Rainer von Stahl, watching them from the side, orders the launch of a torpedo that destroys his ship. Taking advantage of this moment of inattention, Jim helps Eleni to escape. For their part, Jessie and Mortimer recover members of the commandos at the scene of the drama. While they are looking for Blake on board a canoe, the aircraft takes off and abandons them just as another torpedo targets it. After having found Blake, Jessie and Mortimer see Rainer von Stahl and his men board a submarine which has just surfaced. The three friends travel along the coast to the village of Syrenios. In view of the means available to Rainer von Stahl, it is clear to Blake and Jessie that he is supported by an organization such as the ODESSA and the former SS members.

In Syrenios, Blake, Mortimer and Jessie find housing at the village Café. They then have the happy surprise to see Eleni after she escaped. The next day, the four friends go to the only cave on the island looking for clues of the Christian congregation. They find a kind of decorative fresco that Mortimer found a copy of in the breakfast room of their landlady. During the night, the professor eventually understands that a message is hidden in the fresco and deciphers it. The message directs them to the door of Orpheus, traditionally placed in the cave of Acheruse in Epirus, at the other end of the country. A Turkish smuggler agrees to take them on his old boat but once at sea, they have the unpleasant surprise to find Olrik. A struggle ensues during which the smuggler gets killed, Olrik falls into the water and the boat catches fire. Blake, Mortimer, Jessie and Eleni build a raft and collect Olrik. The next day, they are saved by the yacht of the same couple of British compatriots that had already met Mortimer. They return to Athens but upon their arrival, Olrik escapes from the boat.

In the Embassy of Great Britain, Blake and Mortimer attend a meeting between British, American and Greek intelligence services. It is decided to continue the search for the grave of Judas hoping to exchange his location against the lives of the hostages, Jim and Dr. Markopoulos. Blake and Mortimer visit the cave of Acheruse, in Epirus, with a Greek Counterintelligence agent Konstantinos. At the bottom of the cave, they finally find the grave of Judas and his body intact. At that time, Rainer von Stahl and Olrik appear with Eleni who has betrayed them. A short gun battle ensues and Konstantinos gets shot. Mortimer gives back the thirty pieces of silver to Rainer von Stahl reluctantly. But when the latter rejoices, the corpse of Judas stands and curses him. A ray of light envelops Judas who thanks the Lord before falling to dust while a lightning bolt strikes Rainer von Stahl who catches fire. At the same time, an earthquake occurs and Mortimer, Blake and Eleni flee while Olrik falls into a crevasse. The other survivors were arrested by men of the MI6. With this information, MI6 men take over the fortress of the Nazis and release Jim and Dr. Markopoulos, while Colonel Georgiopoulos, Director of the Greek counter-intelligence and Rainer von Stahl's informant, commits suicide after promising that their time will come.

== Volume I mistakes ==
- page 22, eagle misplaced on Nazi officer;
- page 36, Corinthus channel outdated;
- page 36, Nafplio and Aulis are two different places, about 200 km apart, while Jason and the Argonauts did not sail on their quest of the Golden Fleece from Argos, but from Iolkos (today: Volos), a city about 440 km north of Argos.
- page 41, Colonel Olrik kills a man using an M16 not yet built at the time of action.

== English publication ==
These two albums were published by Cinebook Ltd in 2012 as The Curse of the 30 Pieces of Silver, parts 1 & 2.

== App game ==
These two albums were adapted to App Games, sold at iTunes as "Blake and Mortimer – The Curse of the Thirty Denarii – HD". It also had an Android version.
