= The Strange Encounter =

The Strange Encounter (L'Étrange Rendez-Vous)
- Date: 2001
- Series: Blake and Mortimer

Creative team
- Writers: Jean Van Hamme
- Artists: Ted Benoit

Original publication
- Language: French

Translation
- Publisher: Cinebook Ltd
- Date: January 2009
- Translator: Jerome Saincantin

Chronology
- Preceded by: The Voronov Plot
- Followed by: The Sarcophagi of the Sixth Continent, Volume 1: The Universal Threat

The Strange Encounter (L'Étrange Rendez-Vous in the original French) is the fifteenth book in the Blake and Mortimer series created by Edgar P. Jacobs. Published in 2001, it was written by Jean Van Hamme and drawn by Ted Benoit who had already contributed to the series with The Francis Blake Affair in 1996. Whereas that book dealt with espionage, this story combines elements of detective and science fiction of the sort present in Jacobs' original stories.

== Plot ==
Late one night in 1954, a Colorado farmer sees three strange coloured beams of light appearing from the sky. When he goes to investigate the lights have disappeared and left behind the body of a man dressed in the uniform of a British Redcoat. The body is taken to SUFOS (Section of UFO Studies) run by Dr Walt Kaufman which investigates such strange phenomena. Kaufman's research indicates that it is the body of Scottish Major Lachlan Macquarrie who disappeared under strange circumstances after the British defeat at the Battles of Saratoga in 1777.

Following the battle, Macquarrie and his men were cut off from the rest of the British forces. According to drummer boy Dermot Pitt, Macquarrie vanished late at night while investigating the sudden appearance of beams of light coming from out of the sky. Pitt's story was rejected and Macquarrie was found guilty in absentia of desertion and dishonourably discharged from the army.

Kaufmann contacts Professor Philip Mortimer who happens to be a descendant of Lachlan Macquarrie, the family's black sheep. Mortimer goes to America accompanied by his old friend Captain Francis Blake, the head of Britain's MI5, who is on his way for a "routine meeting" with some American colleagues. On his way to Washington by coach, Blake is attacked by some strange men but gets away.

In Kansas, Mortimer meets Kaufman at the offices of SUFOS. He has brought with him some family papers which note certain physical injuries that his ancestor endured in his lifetime. These injuries are present on the body and there is no doubt that it is Lachlan Macquarrie, born in 1743 and found dead in 1954 still aged 34.

According to a pathologist, Macquarrie died of asphyxiation, meaning that he was deprived of oxygen for a long period. His baldric is inscribed with the words "Yellow King, 8061, Danger, Light, Plutonian, H, Poplar Trees, Temple 1954". He also had in his possession some strange items including some glasses which enable the wearer to see clearly in the dark and a weapon which, when aimed at the head, causes the victim to fall asleep.

Wanting to examine the weapon more closely, Mortimer takes it with him before leaving the SUFOS offices, but, overcome with natural fatigue, returns it to Kaufman before booking into a hotel. During the night he is attacked by an intruder who is wearing the same glasses and using the same weapon as Macquarrie had. Mortimer fights back and the man falls out of the hotel room and is killed on hitting the ground. Mortimer then finds that his face is a mask covering a green, highly deformed, alien-like head. Warned by Mortimer, Kaufman has the body taken to SUFOS.

One of the words on Macquarrie's shoulder strap was "Plutonian" and the two scientists wonder if this stands for Pluto. The body of the alien suggests that it is not suitable for Pluto's harsh environment, but the planet may be a staging post for an alien invasion. Back at SUFOS Mortimer examines the alien weapon only for it to be stolen by Kaufman's assistant Jimmy Tcheng. Mortimer pursues Tcheng by car into the plains but they are caught in a storm and Tcheng is killed in an accident. It turns out that he is also an alien.

Mortimer tries to hitch-hike back to town only to come across two men wearing the same dark glasses as the first alien and knocking him out with the ray from a similar weapon. He wakes up to find himself in a disused and isolated pumping station somewhere in the hills and facing him is none other than his old enemy Olrik.

Escorted through the station Mortimer faces more surprises: Asian soldiers dressed in uniforms similar to Olrik's, more aliens including a dwarf-like scientist called Doctor Z'ong, and all of them led by none other than Basam Damdu, the tyrant whom Mortimer helped to overthrow and destroy at the conclusion of the saga of the Swordfish.

After confronting Mortimer and announcing that he will pay for the "great wrong" he did to him, Basam Damdu gets into a bulky spacesuit and disappears via three beams of light. Doctor Z'ong explains to Mortimer that he and his fellow "aliens" are in fact from the year 8061 (which was noted on Macquarrie's baldric), a time when the earth is just one dry desert with mankind on the verge of extinction. This, and their alien-like deformities, are due to years of nuclear war which ravaged the planet in the 21st century.

Z'ong has mastered the concept of time travel. As part of the process his beams of light rebound on the nucleus of passing comets which determine where and when the time traveller will end up. In his early tests he "picked up" a number of people from the past including Major Macquarrie who, being of good build, survived the journey into the future but died when he returned to warn the present world of a major threat. Indeed, the actual aim of Z'ong and his people is to escape the terrible world they inhabit in the 81st century and take over the current one. Basam Damdu seemed the ideal choice to lead them and was picked up by the beams of light just before his capital was destroyed by the Swordfish aircraft designed by Mortimer.

Olrik then interrupts Z'ong and takes Mortimer outside the pumping station to a lake where his hands and legs are tied to a heavy weight and he is thrown into the water by the Asian soldiers. His lungs set to burst, Mortimer has given up when he is suddenly rescued by a pair of scuba divers. They take him to a nearby underwater cave and turn out to be FBI agents led by John Calloway, head of its "Action" service, and Jessie Wingo, a Native American woman who knows the area well. Also present is Blake.

Blake tells Mortimer that Olrik's presence was reported on American soil and that he came to assist the FBI since he knows the renegade best. Discretion meant that he had to keep this from Mortimer, a common occurrence in their relationship. Mortimer tells the Feds of his adventure and Calloway decides to use the element of surprise and attack the pumping station before the invasion plan can get underway. An attack is launched but the station is found empty. Evidence left behind shows signs of a sudden departure which means that Olrik and Z'ong are about to carry out their plan, which was dubbed Operation Poplar Trees, a word included on Macquarrie's baldric.

Blake, Mortimer, Calloway and Wingo go to see Kaufman at his office at SUFOS. Together they try to figure out what the invasion plan is by using the words found on Macquarrie's shoulder strap. They are joined by Dr Jeronimo Martinez who works at Los Alamos and who is keen to compare theories on nuclear physics with Mortimer. He reveals in passing that Los Alamos is Spanish for poplar tree. This leads the others to believe that Olrik's plan is to steal H-bombs and send them into the future from where they will be used to threaten the present time period.

The shoulder strap had the words: "Yellow King, 8061, Danger, Light, Plutonian, H, Poplar Trees, Temple 1954" which translate into: Basam Damdu, the year of origin of the invaders, the threat, the lights used for time travel, the plutonium that is part of the H-bombs, Operation Poplar Trees and a comet discovered by Wilhelm Tempel which is due to appear on the 17 October 1954 in just a few days time and will be used to get the bombs into the future.

The appearance of the comet coincides with the transfer of four bombs from Los Alamos to a secret military base in Nevada. Calloway is unable to convince the military of the threat or to delay the convoy so he decides to intervene without official cover. He and Wingo set off with their men, accompanied by Blake, Mortimer, Martinez and Kaufman. They discreetly take over the hills surrounding a plain in the desert from where they can see Olrik, his Asian troops and the men from the future preparing to ambush the convoy. The Feds attack and Z'ong attempts to escape using his time machine. Blake however throws in a few stick of dynamite as the lights appear from the sky. The sticks accompany Z'ong back to the future where they destroy him and his machine. Basam Damdu is now trapped in the 81st century, the machine in the current time period is also destroyed and the threat is no more.

In the confusion, Olrik manages to escape with one of the trucks containing an H-bomb. Blake and his group are warned of this and Wingo, who knows the area well, drives them to the Hoover Dam where they block Olrik's passage. Facing yet another failure and the fact that Mortimer is still alive, Olrik loses his mind and arms the bomb. Wingo manages to shoot and wound him and Mortimer disarms the weapon before it can go off.

A few weeks later, back in Scotland, a low-key funeral is held. Major Lachlan Macquarrie, re-instated into the British army, is posthumously awarded the Victoria Cross for exceptional bravery and buried with honour. Present at the funeral are Blake and Mortimer, who are then approached by the Cabinet Secretary, who informs them that a secret report on their adventure has been passed on to all of the world's heads of government, regardless of political ideology.

The consequences of the future as the result of nuclear war must serve as a warning. The plan is to set up an agreement for all sides to stop the creation of weapon of mass destruction in order to preserve a clean earth for their children and their children's children: a planet worthy of all that is best in mankind, the hope of a sincere bonding between all the peoples of the world. A difficult task, but nothing is insurmountable.

== Connections to other books ==
Basam Damdu is the tyrant who conquers the world in Blake and Mortimer's first adventure The Secret of the Swordfish by E.P. Jacobs, published in 1946-49. He and Olrik are together when his palace is destroyed by an aerial bombardment at the end of the story. Jacobs never explained how Olrik survived the attack to confront Blake and Mortimer in almost all their subsequent adventures. It was later revealed in the Yves Sente-penned The Valley of the Immortals that Olrik escaped in a prototype VTOL-equipped flying wing.

== English publication ==
The first publication in English was by Cinebook Ltd in January 2009.
