= Ted Benoit =

- Born: Thierry Benoit; 25 July 1947 Niort, Deux-Sèvres, France
- Died: 30 September 2016 (aged 69) France
- Area: France
- Notable works: Bingo Bongo et son Combo Congolais; Ray Banana; Blake and Mortimer
- Awards: Prix du meilleur scénariste (Angoulême, 1979)

Thierry "Ted" Benoit (25 July 1947 – 30 September 2016) was a French comic artist, graphic novelist and prominent figure in the stylish Franco-Belgian ligne claire comics scene in the 1980s. His influences included Edgar P. Jacobs, Moebius, Robert Crumb and to a lesser extend Jacques Tardi.

Among his works from the 1980s are Bingo Bongo et son Combo Congolais, a series about aspiring novelist Bingo B. Bongo and his travails; and Ray Banana, a film noir pastiche. Some of these were published in English in Heavy Metal.

Benoit illustrated two books in the Blake and Mortimer series, both written by Jean Van Hamme: The Francis Blake Affair, 1996; and The Strange Encounter, 2001. Benoit died on 30 September 2016 at the age of 69.

== Published albums ==
- 1979: Hôpital, Les Humanoïdes Associés
- 1981: Vers la ligne claire, Les Humanoïdes Associés
- 1982: Histoires vraies, written by Yves Cheraqui, Les Humanoïdes Associés
- 1982: Berceuse électrique, Ray Banana T.1, Casterman
- 1986: Cité Lumière, Ray Banana T.2, Casterman
- 1987: Bingo Bongo et son combo congolais, Les Humanoïdes Associés
- 1989: L'Homme de nulle part, Les mémoires de Thelma Ritter T.1, drawn by Pierre Nedjar, written by Ted Benoit, Casterman
- 1996: L'Affaire Francis Blake, Blake et Mortimer T.13, written by Jean Van Hamme, Éditions Blake et Mortimer
- 2001: L'Étrange Rendez-vous, Blake et Mortimer T.15, written by Jean Van Hamme, Éditions Blake et Mortimer
- 2004: Playback, drawn by François Ayroles, adapted by Ted Benoit from a script by Raymond Chandler, Éditions Denoël
- 2013: Camera Obscura – Vers la ligne claire et retour, Champaka.
- 2014: La Philosophie dans la piscine, Ray Banana T.3, La Boîte à bulles.
