= The Time Trap (comics) =

1962 comic book album by Edgar P. Jacobs

The Time Trap (Le Piège diabolique)
- Cover of the French-language edition
- Date: 1962
- Series: Blake and Mortimer
- Publisher: Les Editions Blake et Mortimer (Dargaud-Lombard)

Creative team
- Writers: Edgar P. Jacobs
- Artists: Edgar P. Jacobs

Original publication
- Language: French

Translation
- Publisher: Comcat Comics; Cinebook Ltd
- Date: 1989; 2014
- Translator: Jean-Jacques Surbeck

Chronology
- Preceded by: S.O.S. Meteors: Mortimer in Paris
- Followed by: The Necklace Affair

The Time Trap (French: Le Piège diabolique) by the Belgian artist Edgar P. Jacobs was the ninth comic book in the Blake and Mortimer series. It first appeared in book format in 1962.

== Plot ==
In the foyer of a Paris hotel, Mortimer joins up with his friend Blake to deliver startling news: his old adversary, Dr. Miloch, recently deceased from radiation poisoning, has bequeathed him a scientific discovery, hidden inside a house in La Roche-Guyon. Because Blake has to depart on urgent business, and his curiosity getting the better of him, Mortimer departs for the house by himself. Once inside the house, he reads a letter Miloch has left him, to learn to his astonishment that Miloch has built a chronoscaphe for Mortimer to use and keep.

Despite his skepticism, Mortimer follows the instructions in the letter and finally discovers the time machine in Miloch's old laboratory in the house's basement crypt. A taped recording of Miloch's voice gives him instructions of how to use the time machine, and once inside, Mortimer activates the device, which stuns him into unconsciousness as it takes off with gut-wrenching velocity. When Mortimer comes to, he finds himself in a strange swampland, and beholding a nearby Williamsonia concludes correctly that Miloch has sabotaged the time machine to strand Mortimer in time.

Mortimer narrowly escapes the dangers of the prehistoric swamp and into the future, where he finds himself inside the castle which is connected to Miloch's house via a secret passage, witnessing a violent peasant revolt against the tyrannical lord, Baron Gui de La Roche. After accidentally stumbling into the baron's throne room, he is accused as an accomplice of the rebels; fleeing the baron's men, he encounters the baron's daughter, Agnes de La Roche, before the two witness the rebels storming the castle thanks to the actions of a treacherous servant. Mortimer challenges the rebels' leader, Jacques Bonhomme, to unarmed single combat for safe conduct for himself and Agnes, and defeats him. But when Bonhomme proves a sore loser and sets his underlings against Mortimer and Agnes, Mortimer just barely buys enough time to enable Agnes' escape and reactivate the time machine before the peasants can get their hands on him.

The next time Mortimer stops the chronoscaphe, he finds himself in the ruined remains of a modern underground city destroyed in an apocalyptic war. Straying through the ruins and nearly succumbing to starvation and exhaustion, he eventually finds himself in the hands of yet another band of rebels. As he learns from their leader, Doctor Focas, the year is now 5060 and the Earth has been devastated by a worldwide nuclear war three thousand years ago and most of humanity reverted to barbarism. However, a tyranny system eventually established itself from a remnant of civilization, rising to supreme power over the world and attempting to completely subjugate humanity as a slave race under its rule. A rebel movement has arisen despite the strict surveillance of public life and allied itself with human colonies spread all over the Solar System, and Mortimer's accidental arrival in the future inadvertently "confirmed" a prophecy that a red-bearded liberator would one day appear to cast down the tyranny and lead the oppressed to freedom.

After hearing all these startling facts, Mortimer pledges his assistance to Focas and with his aid reactivates an old nuclear plant to produce miniaturized nuclear grenades to combat the tyrant's forces. Unknown to them, Focas' second in command, Krishma, is a traitor and secret spy for the tyrant. Eventually, Focas is captured and hypnotized by the tyrant's minions, and Krishma prepares his final steps to defeat the rebel movement from within by luring the rebels to their elimination. However, after noticing Focas' peculiar behavior (stemming from his brainwashing), Mortimer quickly smells treason and exposes Krishma's true allegiance. When the tyrant's robots attack, Krishma is accidentally killed by them, which releases Focas from his mind control. After Focas urging Mortimer to don a protective suit previously worn by Krishma, the two manage to secure the retreat of their men into the underground. As the rebels' allies move in from space to bring down the tyrant, he unleashes his ultimate weapon, a living lava monster, on Mortimer and Focas. Barely evading the monster, Mortimer lures it into the reactor and sets it to overload, destroying both. Cut off from the surface, he returns to the time machine, and after a last farewell to Focas, he departs for the past.

As Mortimer travels back, he finds that the acceleration does not affect him anymore due to his protective suit, and thus he manages to stop the time machine a few weeks before his departure from the present. He finds himself back at Miloch's laboratory, which is still intact at that point, and witnesses the then-living Miloch sabotaging the chronoscaphe's controls and preparing his trap for Mortimer. Acting upon his findings, Mortimer fixes the device and starts it for his journey back to the present. As he arrives several days afterwards - to a point where Blake has since begun searching for his missing friend - an explosive booby trap left by Miloch as a final insurance destroys the chronoscaphe and the laboratory, though Mortimer ultimately survives because of his suit. After conferring with Mortimer, Blake announces that the government will keep the details to the case confidential, especially since the public is already ripe with rumors about Mortimer's mysterious disappearance.

Picking up a plot element from the story's beginning where two men were discussing their respective views of the past and future, Mortimer concludes the episode with a good-natured remark about how the future might see the 20th century as the true "good old times".

== Jacobs' view of the future ==
Like many at the time, Jacobs imagined a future where nuclear war is a matter of "when" rather than "if", but he also makes passing comments on how things vary with time:

- One such variation is spelling: while exploring an abandoned underground railway of the future, Mortimer notices a panel with the words: "Stassion 3 Direcsion Pari Santre", which in today's French would be "Station 3 Direction Paris Centre";
- A map indicates that at some stage Europe becomes the Eta Uni DEurope é de Méditerané ("États-Unis d'Europe et de Méditerranée") and that the Adriatic and the Mediterranean have become land masses;
- Africa itself becomes the Eta Uni Dafrik, with a large ocean in the middle of the Sahara;
- A newspaper-like article from the 22nd century erroneously credits Mortimer with the creation of the Telecephaloscope, a device actually created by Doctor Septimus, whom he had met in a previous adventure, The Yellow "M".

== Trivia ==
- It is one of only two volumes so far that do not feature Colonel Olrik (the other being The Oath of the Five Lords).
- In Mortimer's prehistoric sojourn sequence, he has a series of rather anachronistic encounters with the local fauna: Meganeura from the Carboniferous period; Plateosaurus from the Late Triassic; Elasmosaurus (additionally notwithstanding that this is a marine reptile, not a swampdweller), Pteranodon and Tyrannosaurus rex from the Late Cretaceous.

== English publication ==
The Time Trap was published in English in 1989 by Comcat Comics. It was translated by Jean-Jacques Surbeck, and edited by Bernd Metz. Cinebook Ltd republished it in 2014.

== Media adaptation ==
The album was adapted into a radio play in 1962.
