= The Oath of the Five Lords =

The Oath of the Five Lords (Le Serment des cinq Lords)
- First edition
- Date: 16 November 2012
- Series: Blake and Mortimer

Creative team
- Writers: Yves Sente
- Artists: André Juillard

Original publication
- Language: French

Translation
- Publisher: Cinebook Ltd
- Date: 2014
- ISBN: 978-1-84918-191-4
- Translator: Jerome Saincantin

Chronology
- Preceded by: The Gondwana Shrine
- Followed by: The Septimus Wave

The Oath of the Five Lords is the twenty-first Blake and Mortimer book in the series. The story was written by Yves Sente. The book was drawn by André Juillard and was released on the 16 November 2012.

== Plot ==
In 1919, Colonel Thomas Edward Lawrence, called Lawrence of Arabia, is about to publish his memoirs in which he describes how the United Kingdom did not honor its promises to the Arab nation. Lieutenant Alister Lawless of the MI5 confiscates his memoirs then threatens him with reprisals if he does not remove the unpatriotic passages from his book. 35 years later, a mysterious individual disguised as a ghost steals a valuable violin from the Ashmolean Museum at Oxford University.

In London, Captain Francis Blake learns in the newspaper of the death of Lord Pitchwick, a good friend and former comrade of Oxford, and decides to go to his burial that afternoon despite being far from the south of England. For his part, Professor Philip Mortimer travels to Oxford to give a seminar at the University at the invitation of Professor Diging, Curator of the famous Ashmolean Museum. He is welcomed at the station by Lisa Pantry, a student assistant of Professor Diging, who goes directly to the museum. Mortimer can not help but share his thoughts on the theft that took place to the Curator, overheard by the Chief Warden Mac Tearaway and simple-minded assistant Alfred Clayton who owes his job to Lisa.

At the funeral of his friend, Blake makes reacquaintance with his former comrades of Oxford, Lords Davlon and Bowmore, who are not on speaking terms. He learns that the deceased died of a violent death and not of an accident, and is surprised not to see Lord Toddle. The latter is in fact held prisoner in his home and tortured by two hooded individuals seeking an object that he has hidden. That same evening, the mysterious ghost returns to steal a vase of no great value at the Ashmolean Museum without the chief guard being able to stop him, knocked out by an accomplice. Mortimer decides to appeal to his friend Captain Blake, who is very interested in the case. The leader of the MI5 is then urgently called to the bedside of Lord Toddle who ends up dying from his wounds. His deputy David Honeychurch rushes him to Lord Bowmore's estate, where he finds the Lords Davlon and Bowmore in full hunting competition to celebrate the mending of their relationship. The three friends understand that someone knows the existence of their secret society and tries to find what they have sworn to protect. Blake places the two lords under the protection of the MI5. Lord Bowmore reveals to him the object of the museum which serves as his hiding-place while Lord Davlon refuses. Warned, Mortimer steals a Turkish candelabrum from a showcase in the museum and hides it in his room.

Blake follows a track about Alister Lawless who committed suicide years ago. He meets his former lawyer who tells him that Lawless had written a letter to hand over to his son on his 20th birthday. He also discovered that his wife was detained in the psychiatric hospital in Weston-super-Mare and she was pregnant with a girl. He then searches for the two children and finds John Hastings, Lisa's boyfriend. Meanwhile, Lord Bowmore is murdered in his home by the ghost before the arrival of MI5 agents and Mortimer discovers the pages of a manuscript hidden in the candelabrum. Lord Davlon arrives at Oxford to check that his share is well hidden in the museum. He reveals to Mortimer the existence of the "TE Spirit Society", whose five members share a heavy secret and confesses to him the suspicion of the fifth Lord of all these crimes. Mortimer discovers that the leaflets were stolen from his room and that a new object was stolen from the museum. Back at his hotel, Lord Davlon receives an anonymous message that infuriates him: he rushes out with his car and is the victim of a road accident caused by the ghost. Blake and Mortimer arrive at the scene of the drama with Sergeant Mac's jeep but it is too late, Lord Davlon is dead.

Blake finally reveals the whole story to Mortimer: then a student at Oxford University, he creates with his four titled friends the "TE Spirit Society" to defend the work of their hero, Lawrence of Arabia. He was the fifth Lord, symbolically ennobled by his friends. But tired of worldliness, he joined the Royal Air Force, then the MI5 where he worked under the command of Lieutenant Alister Lawless. On 13 May 1935, he participated, unwittingly, in the assassination of Lawrence of Arabia. Learning that Lawless hated Lawrence personally and acted on his own, he recovers Lawrence's manuscript from his chest and summons his friends from the TE Spirit Society. They divide the manuscript between them and hide each part in an object of their choice that they gift to the Ashmolean Museum. They swear never to reveal their secret, but Lawless is informed by an informant, just before he is arrested by MI6 warned by Blake.

Mortimer is kidnapped by the ghost to serve as currency for the part of the manuscript held by Blake. The latter hands it over, and, while he releases his friend, the ghost flies with his accomplice, but they are shot down by Sergeant Mac. Blake and Mortimer discover that the two criminals are Lisa Pantry and Alfred Clayton, Lawless's children who wanted to avenge their father after reading the letter he had left. The whole matter is classified as defense secret and Blake hides the manuscript in the Ashmolean Museum whose location will only be revealed by his will. He gives Mortimer a letter announcing that Sir Hugh Calvin, Professor Raymond Vernay and Leslie Macomber are co-opting him to be part of the Centaur Club in exchange for a service rendered.
