= Peter van Dongen =

Dutch cartoonist (born 1966)

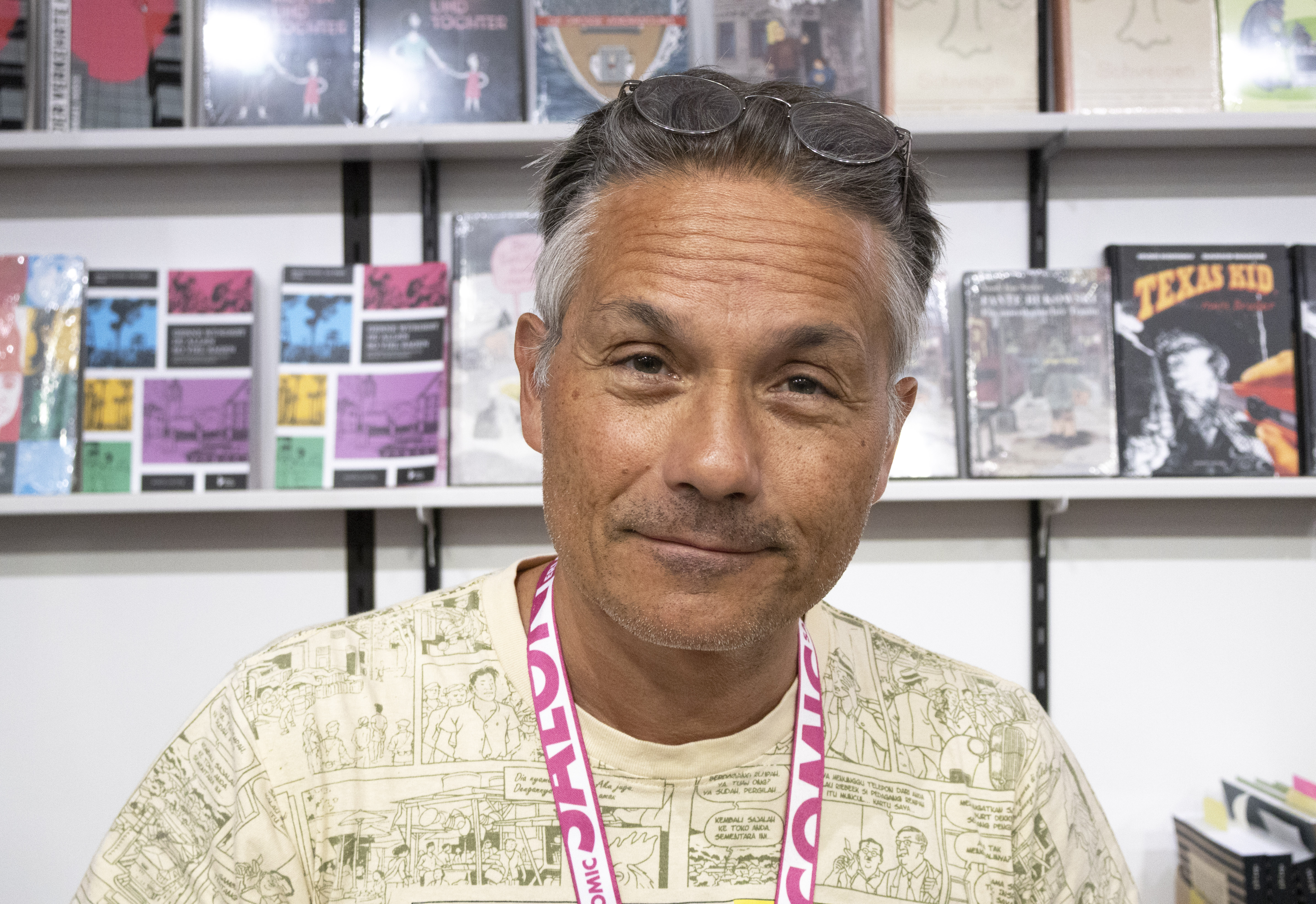
Peter Van Dongen in 2026

Peter van Dongen (born 21 October 1966 in Amsterdam) is a Dutch cartoonist. He is the winner of the 2018 Stripschapprijs.
