= Yves Sente =

Belgian comics writer

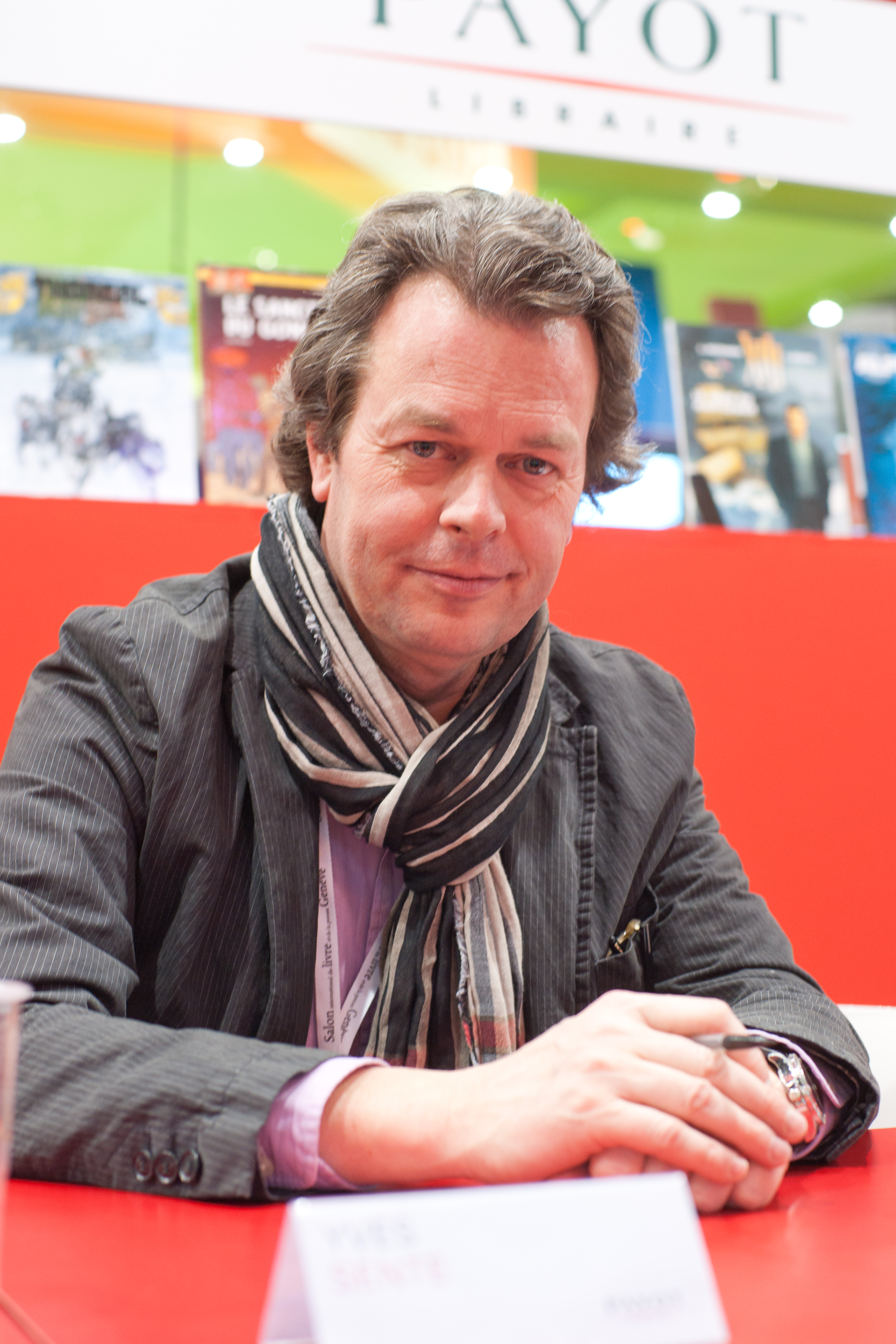
- Born: 17 January 1964 (age 62)
- Areas: writer, editor
- Notable works: Blake and Mortimer; Thorgal
- Awards: full list

Yves Sente (born 17 January 1964) is a Belgian comic book editor and author. He is known as a writer for XIII, Blake and Mortimer and Thorgal.

== Biography ==
Yves Sente was born in Uccle near Brussels in 1964. After studying in Belgium, he went to high school in Arlington Heights, Illinois before returning to Belgium to study law at the Facultés universitaires Saint-Louis and international affairs at the Université catholique de Louvain. He contributed cartoons to a number of magazines from 1986 on, including The Wall Street Journal Europe.

Sente started to work full-time in the comics industry in 1991 as editor at Le Lombard, one of the main publishers of Franco-Belgian comics.

Knowing a lot of authors through his work as an editor, Sente branched out to writing comics, specializing in continuing existing successful series where the original author had died or was no longer interested in it. He also create two new short series.

Sente is now one of the best selling comics writers. By 2003, his new adventure of Blake and Mortimer reached sales of 600,000 copies, with the sequel the next year still selling 520,000 copies. By 2007, his reprise of Thorgal also reached the top ten of bestselling French comics with an initial run of 250,000 copies.

=== XIII ===
Sente is interested to continue the series XIII now that Jean Van Hamme has declared to be no longer interested. He was contacted by the artist William Vance and has agreed to propose a story to Van Hamme, but no agreement has been reached yet. Ever since October 2008, Sente has authored volume 19 of the comic series (The Day of the Mayflower), late 2011, alongside Youri Jigounov.

== Bibliography ==
- 2000: Blake and Mortimer 14: The Voronov Plot, artwork by André Juillard
- 2003: Blake and Mortimer 16: The Sarcophagi of the Sixth Continent, Volume 1: The Universal Threat, artwork by Juillard
- 2004: Blake and Mortimer 17: The Sarcophagi of the Sixth Continent, Volume 2: Battle of the Minds, artwork by Juillard
- 2004–2005: La vengeance du comte Skarbek, 2 volumes, artwork by Grzegorz Rosiński
- 2007: Le janitor, 2 volumes, with François Boucq
- 2007–2008: Thorgal volume 30-31, artwork by Rosiński
- 2008: Blake and Mortimer 18: The Gondwana Shrine, artwork by Juillard

== Awards ==
- 2000: Award for Best Short Comic Strip at the Haxtur Awards for The Voronov Plot: also nominated for best script
- 2006: nominated for Best French Comic at the Prix Saint-Michel in Brussels for Vengeance du comte Skarbek 2: Un coeur de bronze
- 2006: nominated for Best Long Comic Strip at the Haxtur Awards for Vengeance du comte Skarbek
- 2007: nominated for Best Story at the Prix Saint-Michel for Le janitor 1: l'Ange de Malte
- 2011: nominated for Best Story at the Prix Saint-Michel for Les mondes de Thorgal: Kriss de Valnor
