= The Voronov Plot =

The Voronov Plot (La Machination Voronov)
- Cover to the English-language edition
- Date: 2000
- Series: Blake and Mortimer

Creative team
- Writers: Yves Sente
- Artists: André Juillard

Original publication
- Language: French

Translation
- Publisher: Cinebook Ltd
- Date: September 2010
- Translator: Jerome Saincantin

Chronology
- Preceded by: The Francis Blake Affair
- Followed by: The Strange Encounter

The Voronov Plot is the fourteenth book in the Blake and Mortimer comic book series. It was released in 2000.

== Plot ==
On January 16, 1957, a rocket takes off from the Baikonur cosmodrome on the orders of General Oufa of the Red Army, seeking to keep its lead over the United States in the conquest of space. As Professor Piotr Ilioutchine had feared, the rocket is hit by a meteor shower and the head falls back to Earth. The team sent to recover it having died under mysterious circumstances, Dr. Voronov, head of a clinic of the KGB, is responsible for clearing up the mystery. His assistant, Nastasia Wardynska, discovers that the head of the rocket is infected with a mutant bacteria, "bacteria Z", which causes death within 24 hours by simple contact. But the Kremlin orders are formal: officially, this case never happened. Defying the orders of Ufa, Voronov forces his assistant to continue his research to understand why young rats turn out be healthy carriers.

In London, Captain Francis Blake and Commander William Steele, respectively heads of MI5 and MI6, are discussing a worrying situation: Steele received a report about the bacterium Z and the willingness of Voronov to use it as a biological weapon against the West. His spy, who turns out be Nastasia Wardynska, recruited by Captain Blake ten years previously, promises to send a sample of the bacteria next month. One night at Baikonur, Nastasia steals a tube test containing the bacteria and sends it to her contact in Moscow, Sergei Pouskachoi. Voronov realizes, and after having confirmation of the betrayal of his assistant, locks her up at the headquarters of the KGB in Moscow, Lubyanka, under the custody of General Orloff and Colonel Ilkor. In addition, the latter intervenes to prevent the exchange of the precious parcel between Pouskachoi and an agent of MI6.

Informed of events, Blake decides to go himself to the USSR to deliver Nastasia and retrieve the sample. To do this, he takes as a cover the identity of Mac Taser, interpreter of Professor Philip Mortimer, official guest at the International Congress in Moscow. On-site, the two friends make contact with Edgar Reeves, scientific attaché of the embassy of the United Kingdom and the MI6 agent. They are developing a plan to rescue Nastasia, but Reeve's secretary, Miss Sneek, is actually a mole and informs Orloff of the presence of Mortimer. Colonel Ilkor, alias Olrik, is certain that Blake is in the vicinity. At a concert organized after his lecture, Mortimer gets closer to his friend Professor Ilioutchine in order to get information about the bacteria. But while the Russian talks of young rats, Voronov surprises the two men behind the scenes and stops Ilioutchine while Mortimer narrowly escapes death.

The next day, Blake infiltrates the Lubyanka disguised as a KGB officer with a fake transfer order regarding Nastasia, but Olrik awaits him and unmasks him. After defeating the colonel, Blake and Nastasia manage to escape after a chase through the city. However, Nastasia is severely wounded in the head by a bullet fired by Olrik and she faints right after telling Blake "the doll has a black head". The same night, Blake travels to Leninskiye Gory Park to meet Pouskachoi, but Olrik is waiting for him again. About to be captured, the captain is saved by the arrival of Reeves and Mortimer who discovered the betrayal of Miss Sneek. After a shootout, Mortimer begins pursuing Olrik, who manages to throw the sample into the Moskva River. In the Park, Pouskachoi utters before dying the sentence "the world of childhood", the name of a toyshop in Moscow. Mortimer, protected by his guest status, decides to go there and get back without problem a Russian doll that contains the bacterium Z sample.

A few days later, both British are back in their country through a deception. While Professor Mortimer and his team start their research on the bacterium, Captain Blake reports to the Committee of Security. He advises not to warn, for the moment, the Americans of the threat, for fear of starting a new world war and feeling there's something else going on behind the whole affair. In Moscow, Voronov, mad with rage, charges Olrik to retrieve or destroy the sample stolen by suggesting that the Kremlin is involved. He decides to put his plan into action, and in the following days, several personalities, American and European, die suddenly. On his side, thanks to a mole placed at the CSIR, Olrik manages to retrieve the samples and set fire to the laboratory. Fortunately, Mortimer had put away a sample and this last one is duplicated and sent to several laboratories across the country to reduce the risk.

While that the death of personalities around the world keep coming, Mortimer travels to Liverpool, where one of his colleagues has discovered that it is the thymus of the young rats that allows them to resist the bacteria. At a new Security Committee, Blake learns that three Soviet politicians close to the government have died. He understands that Voronov, nostalgic of Stalin, is playing alone and trying to destabilize his country from the inside and the outside to take power. The British Secret Service decide to alert the Russians and Blake proposes a collaboration to the Russian Ambassador who accepts. At Baikonur, General Oufa, made aware of the situation, is responsible for overseeing Voronov, but, determined to settle his scores with the doctor, he gets killed in the laboratory by Voronov, who flees.

Thanks to the documents exchanged between the two tentatively Allied blocs, Mortimer finds out how the bacteria comes into contact with the targets of the doctor: children who offer them flowers and a kiss. The Professor recalls that a few days before the Queen Mother herself was approached by a young Soviet child, but she is still healthy. Understanding that this girl is the key to the cure, he goes urgently to Liverpool, but Olrik is already on site and is heading the port where a Russian cargo ship is waiting with the girl. With the help of Honeychurch, Mortimer arrives first at the port and organizes a trap for Olrik, who is arrested.

The girl, Grace, is revealed to be suffering from sickle-cell anaemia, and Mortimer manages to create a vaccine against the bacteria from her blood. At the same time, the Soviets arrest General Orloff and the other coup leaders and work with police from around the world to dismantle the network of sleeper agents. They ask that they get back Olrik in order to find Voronov, and the British accept on the condition that Nastasia is able leave the USSR freely. The Exchange takes place on October 3, 1957, on The Glienicke Bridge over the Elbe River separating the two Germanys during which Olrik manages to escape. The next day, Nastasia is offered a post to the CSIR by Mortimer while the Soviets launch Sputnik 1.

== English publication ==
The first publication in English is by Cinebook Ltd in September 2010. It includes information on the creation of this album.
