= The Secret of the Swordfish =

1946–1953 Belgian comics story

The Secret of The Swordfish (Le Secret de l'Espadon)
- Cover of the third album, depicting the Swordfish
- Date: 1950 - 1953
- Series: Blake and Mortimer
- Publisher: Le Lombard

Creative team
- Writers: Edgar P. Jacobs
- Artists: Edgar P. Jacobs

Original publication
- Published in: Tintin magazine
- Date of publication: September 26, 1946 - September 8, 1949
- Language: French

Translation
- Publisher: Les Editions Blake et Mortimer; Cinebook Ltd
- Date: 1986; 2013
- Translator: Jerome Saincantin

Chronology
- Followed by: The Mystery of the Great Pyramid, Volume 1: Manetho's Papyrus

The Secret of The Swordfish was the first story in the Blake and Mortimer comic album series by Edgar P. Jacobs. It describes how a far eastern empire takes over the world and the adventures of two Britons as they try to bring about the development of a weapon which will enable them to fight back. Drawing elements from the recent events of World War II as well as the emerging Cold War, the trilogy is set in an alternate reality of the 1950s, in which a Third World War is played out.

== Publication history ==
The Secret of the Swordfish was first published in Tintin magazine from the very first issue in September 1946. In 1950, the first 18 pages were redrawn and reduced to 17 pages—giving more details on the background of the events leading up to the main plot—and the first half of the story was published as the very first comic album by publisher Lombard, in the later famous Collection du Lombard. A second part followed in 1953. The two part edition was reprinted 9 times between 1955 and 1982. A single volume edition was published in 1964. In 1984, the story was republished in three parts, with new lettering and colouring, and with the inclusion of a number of full page illustrations that had appeared in the magazine but were omitted from the comic albums.

== Plot ==
=== Part 1 ===
The first volume, "Ruthless Pursuit", opens on the eve of a World War. Details are scarce, but the reader is told that the enemy is an Asian superpower known as "the Yellow Empire", ruled by the Emperor Basam Damdu; the free world and the Yellow Empire have been locked in a cold war for the past three years. Within the first few pages of the book, the Yellow Empire launch a worldwide offensive with modern rockets, bombers and paratroopers that quickly conquer the world's other major powers. However, the British military has been secretly working on a new type of super-weapon known as the Swordfish, in anticipation of the war. Forewarned of the attack by a traitor in the Yellow army, Captain Francis Blake, a British officer, and Professor Phillip Mortimer, the scientist developing the Swordfish, escape with the super-weapon's plans, their destination being a secret base in the Middle East where they will be able to finish their work.

The rest of the episode follows their attempts to escape the pursuing Yellow forces, led by the cunning and conniving Colonel Olrik, Basam Damdu's chief of security. They initially escape from Britain in a jet-powered airplane called the "Golden Rocket", but are shot down somewhere over Iran by Yellow interceptors, and are later captured by a defecting Iranian Army Major and his men. After escaping and stealing a truck they are pursued by Yellow army tanks . Mortimer and Blake crash the stolen truck into one of the tanks and the other one is captured by resistance fighters and given to Blake and Mortimer. Using the armoured car they drive to a petrol station near the Afghan border but are soon discovered. While escaping Mortimer tries to contact the base but due to a thunderstorm has trouble doing so. Suddenly an avalanche occurs destroying the armoured car. Blake and Mortimer survive and must continue the trek to the secret base on foot. Along the way, they encounter resistance fighter Ahmed Nasir, who becomes an invaluable help to them, and finally seek refuge in a small town in the Herat province. There, they are quickly betrayed by a Yellow spy. The episode ends with a cliffhanger: the soldiers of the Yellow army are directed to the room where Blake and Mortimer are staying and as they enter they find an astonishing surprise (naturally the reader can only see their reaction, not the cause of it).

=== Part 2 ===
"Mortimer's Escape" takes place in two distinct halves. The first one picks up right where "Ruthless Pursuit" left off. After finding the room empty, the enraged Yellow commander orders his troops to search the city until they find Blake and Mortimer; the commander executes one of the community's elders in the process when the latter refuses to cooperate. This sparks an immediate insurrection in which the outraged townsmen quickly massacre the Yellow troops; in the ensuing chaos, Blake and Mortimer emerge from hiding and take off again, still with Nasir helping them. Eventually, the three of them make it to the Strait of Hormuz, but Blake is injured and loses the wallet containing the Swordfish plans while trying to escape a Yellow patrol. Mortimer then tells Nasir to take Blake to safety, while he returns to search for the plans. He is himself then captured by Yellow troops, but not before he is able to find and conceal the plans.

The second half of the episode begins three months later in Lhassa (the Yellow capital), with Colonel Olrik making a report to the high council of the Yellow Empire. The Yellow are having more and more difficulty controlling their new empire; rebellions and acts of terrorism have continued worldwide, and despite their best efforts, they have still not been able to sweat the Swordfish plans out of Mortimer. As chief of the Empire's security service, Olrik is the natural scapegoat for this state of affairs; he therefore decides to take the gloves completely off and torture Mortimer as harshly as necessary, hoping to finally elicit a confession. Under instructions from Nasir, who has managed to infiltrate his prison in Karachi by posing as an Indian servant, Mortimer pretends to relent, and agrees to reconstitute the Swordfish plans for the Yellow.

After this, in the secret base, Blake and the admiral in command, Sir William Grey, have been conducting resistance against the Yellow (including many of the incidents that Olrik is being blamed for). They now have two urgent priorities; first, to find the lost plans and second, to break Mortimer out of prison. The first problem is resolved when Mortimer is able to pass a message to Nasir telling him where the plans are hidden. Soon after this, Mortimer almost manages a prison break on his own; before the Yellow are able to capture him, he is rescued by Blake and Nasir, who then take him to a submarine and manage to escape under the nose of the Yellow navy and air force.

=== Part 3 ===
"SX1 counterattacks", the third part of the saga, begins soon after Mortimer's escape. In the first pages, British commandos attack and capture a Yellow train taking imprisoned scientists to a forced labor camp. The scientists are freed and taken back to the Hormuz base, where they also begin to work on the Swordfish project. Soon after this, acts of sabotage begin to disrupt the base, and Blake suspects that one of the captured scientists was actually a Yellow mole. This is eventually revealed to be none other than Olrik himself, who personally undertook the operation in an attempt to reestablish his reputation before the Emperor. Olrik manages to escape from the base, and the British are faced with an imminent Yellow invasion. Mortimer suggests a drastic solution; concentrate all the base's efforts on the assembly of only two working Swordfish, which should be enough to destroy a Yellow invasion force. He estimates thirty hours are all the time needed to accomplish this, and Admiral Grey gives him his word that the base will hold.

The next morning, a vast Yellow task force, composed of an aircraft carrier battle group and a number of land and air forces, appears and surrounds the base. The initial attacks are defeated and turned back by the heroic efforts of the British. Olrik then deploys new chemical weapons against the base, which allow the Yellow to gain a foothold and slowly begin to work their way inwards, but both Mortimer and Grey keep their word, and the two Swordfish (designated SX1 and SX2, hence the title) are finished in time. The weapons, piloted by Blake and Mortimer, are unleashed and destroy the Yellow task force in minutes, though one of them is lost in combat. The base is saved, and Sir William Grey launches a radio call to the resistance movements of the world telling them the news and urging them to revolt.

In the following week, open rebellions erupt worldwide, taxing the overextended resources of the Yellow to the limit until the Emperor decides to end the war by launching ICBMs against all the rebel targets (with Olrik strapped to one of the rockets as punishment for his failures). Before he can do this, however, an entire squadron of Swordfish arrives over Lhassa and nukes the city, killing Basam Damdu and decapitating the Yellow Empire under Olrik's mocking eyes. The last scene shows Blake and Mortimer back in a ruined and destroyed London, with Blake commenting that they will rebuild and that civilization, once again, has had the last word - "hopefully, this time, for good".

== Characters ==
- Francis Blake: a former British Royal Air Force pilot and member of the Intelligence Service, who tries unsuccessfully to warn the British government of the impending invasion. He is a key member of the resistance movement.
- Phillip Mortimer: a Scottish-born scientist, and inventor of the Swordfish super weapon. Though a man of science at heart, he can also hold his own in the field and is quite at home in the action of the world war.
- Colonel Olrik: the head of the 13th Bureau, the Yellow state security organ. A European of unknown nationality (possibly German, Russian, Hungarian or Baltic) who betrayed his country to go work for the Yellow.
- Ahmed Nasir: a sergeant in the Makran Levy Corps, a British-raised colonial army. He saves Blake and Mortimer from a Yellow trap on the Iranian-Indian border, and is invaluable to them for the rest of the novels.
- Sir William Grey: a Royal Navy admiral, commanding the secret base in Hormuz and by extension the entire worldwide resistance effort. Loosely based on Winston Churchill, a character similar to Grey is shown serving as the Prime Minister in The Yellow "M".
- Emperor Basam Damdu: the absolute dictator of the Yellow Empire. A megalomaniac based on Adolf Hitler and Joseph Stalin, obsessed with ruling the world and willing to destroy it rather than lose control of it.
- Colonel Li: Olrik's aide de camp, a loyal soldier and accomplished martial artist.
- Rasul: better known as "the Bezendjas" (name of his tribe), he is a native spy recruited by Olrik in his search for Blake and Mortimer.
- Sun Fo: a scientist, member of the Yellow high council and special adviser to Basam Damdu with whom Olrik has a mutually antagonistic relationship.

== English publication ==
The three parts are published in English as The Secret of The Swordfish Volume 1: Ruthless Pursuit, The Secret of The Swordfish Volume 2: Mortimer's Escape and The Secret of The Swordfish Volume 3: SX1 Counterattacks in 1986 by Les Editions Blake and Mortimer. Cinebook Ltd republished these three volumes in 2013.
