= List of fictional cats in comics =

This list of fictional cats and other felines in comics is subsidiary to the list of fictional cats. It is restricted solely to notable feline characters from notable comics. For characters that appear in several separate comics, only the earliest appearance will be recorded here.

Character	Origin	Creator	Notes
Alley-Kat-Abra	DC Comics	Roy Thomas, Scott Shaw	An anthropomorphic cat with magic powers who is a member of the Zoo Crew.
Alpine	Marvel Comics	Kyle Higgins, Rod Reis	A cat adopted by Bucky Barnes.
Anise	Magico		
Aquamarine	Mamotte! Lollipop		
Arlene	Garfield	Jim Davis	Garfield's girlfriend. She is pink with a gap in her front teeth.
Artemis	Codename: Sailor V	Naoko Takeuchi	A white cat that helps Minako Aino to awaken her powers as Sailor Venus.
Atom	Atom the Cat	Al Fago	Published by Charlton Comics in 1957
Attila	Mother Goose and Grimm	Mike Peters	A purple cat
Azrael	The Smurfs	Peyo	Gargamel's red cat who is just as evil as his master.
Babu	Sankarea		
Basil	Basil the Royal Cat		Published in 1953 by St. John Publications
Bill the Cat	Bloom County/ Outland / Opus	Berkeley Breathed	A largely comatose orange tabby cat.
Billy	Billy the Cat	Stéphane Colman and Stephen Desberg	Billy is a boy who was killed in a car accident and reincarnated as a cat.
Biniou	(Phil et) Jordi	François Bel	Phil's white cat.
Blacksad	Blacksad	Juan Díaz Canales and Juanjo Guarnido	John Blacksad, an anthropomorphic tuxedo cat who works as a private detective.
Bucky Katt	Get Fuzzy		Selfish, cynical, and lazy. His ears are nearly always drawn laid back flat on his head, a feline sign of defiance, aggressiveness and/or unfriendliness.
Business Cat	Business Cat	Tom Fonder	An anthropomorphic Persian cat who is a businessman, but who nevertheless didn't lose his cat instincts.
Butch	Pogo	Walt Kelly	A brick-throwing housecat.
Cal	Boes (Ox Tales)	Wil Raymakers and Thijs Wilms	
Calico Cat	Takemitsu Zamurai		
Carrot	Pepper&Carrot	David Revoy	An orange striped cat who is Pepper's pet.
Cassandra Cat	Slylock Fox & Comics for Kids	Bob Weber Jr.	A cat who is a jewel thief and gets by on her charm and beauty.
Catbert	Dilbert	Scott Adams	The evil human resources director.
Cat	Filament		
Cat	Hiiro no Marionetta		
The Cat of Marlinspike Hall	The Adventures of Tintin	Hergé	A nameless black and beige stray cat who lives with Tintin and Captain Haddock at their manor in Marlinspike Hall. The cat originally had a rivalry with Snowy, but in later albums they seem to be friends.
Célimène	Chlorophylle	Raymond Macherot	A cat who kidnaps mice and forces them to steal salami sausages for her in exchange for their lives.
Cha	Cha! Chu! Cho!		
Chaffoux	Chaffoux	Bom and Patrice Cadotq	A gag comic about an unlucky cat which appeared in Tintin in 1986.
Chaminou	Chaminou	Raymond Macherot	An orange anthropomorphic cat who is an aristocrat who wears a monocle, smokes cigars and works as a secret agent.
Le Chat	Le Chat	Philippe Geluck	A grey obese cat who wears a suit. He always addresses the reader with absurd monologues.
Chewie	Marvel Comics	Brian Reed and Roberto De La Torre	An ordinary looking cat who is later revealed to be a Flerken, a cat-like alien.
Chubby Huggs	Get Fuzzy		Oversized, overaffectionate cartoon cat.
Chi	Chi's Sweet Home		An adorable gray and white kitten with black stripes wanders away from her family and is found by a young boy, Youhei, and his mother. They take the kitten home and Chi then has a splendid time living with her new family, learning about different things and meeting new people and animals. Adapted into an anime series.
Chiyo-chichi	Azumanga Daioh		Chiyo Mihama's "father". He may not be a real cat, as he only appears in dreams or as a stuffed toy.
Cicero's Cat (real name: Desdemona)	Cicero's Cat	Bud Fisher	A spin-off of Mutt and Jeff.
Cinnamon	Cinnamon	Victoria Douglas	The protagonist of the 2021 mini-series "CINNAMON"
Coal	Marvel Comics	Jason Loo	A cat adopted by Robbie Reyes who became a Spirit of Vengeance.
Corporal	Boule et Bill	Jean Roba	Neighbourhood cat.
Cybil	Liō	Mark Tatulli	Liō's white cat.
Dex-Starr	DC Comics	Shane Davis	A member of the Red Lantern Corps.
Dinky	Rupert Bear	Alfred Bestall	The black cat of Beryl Sweet, one of the girl guides.
Donyatsu	Donyatsu	Yūsuke Kozaki	
Doraemon	Doraemon	Fujiko F. Fujio	Doraemon is a cat-like robot from the 22nd century who is sent to the 21st century to help Nobita Nobi, intending to improve the lives of him and his descendants.
Ebony	Marvel Comics	Stan Lee, Jack Kirby	Agatha Harkness' cat familiar.
Edgar	Jack, Jacky and the Juniors (Jan, Jans en de Kinderen)	Jan Kruis	A friendly fat red tomcat and the family's pet.
Faron	Peanuts	Charles M. Schulz	A lazy cat who is carried around by Frieda. Faron made only about a dozen appearances in the comic strip.
Fat Freddy's Cat	Fabulous Furry Freak Brothers	Gilbert Shelton	The lazy striped cat of the trio. He later received his own spin-off comic.
Fellini	Macanudo	Liniers	The cat of Enriqueta.
Flossie	Flossie	Gerard Wiegel	A pantomime comic about a black cat.
Figaro, Lucifer, and Oliver	Marvel Comics	Marjorie Liu, Gabriel Hernandez Walta	A group of cats adopted by Gambit and Rogue.
Fluffy	Dennis the Menace and Gnasher	David Law	Walter Brown's cat.
Fritz the Cat	Fritz the Cat	Robert Crumb	An anthropomorphic striped cat who enjoys sex and drugs. Made into an animated feature by Ralph Bakshi in 1972.
Fukumaru	A Man and His Cat	Umi Sakurai	A cat who was passed over for adoption because he was ugly, then adopted by an old man.
Clark Gaybeul	Bronsky Proko, Clark Gaybeul (spin-off)	Édika.	A green anthropomorphic cat.
Garbonzo	Winston	Jim Burnett and Johnny Sajem.	A black cat.
Garfield	Garfield	Jim Davis	Orange-and-black striped cat known for his enormous love for lasagna and sarcastic commentary. He is also very lazy and hates Mondays.
Gaston Lagaffe's cat	Gaston	André Franquin	Nameless playful black-and-white cat of Gaston, who creates a lot of mayhem.
Gaturro	Gaturro	Cristian Dzwonik	A domestic cat, who freely wanders the neighbourhood and causes trouble at school.
GCAT	Homestuck	Andrew Hussie	First guardian of post-scratch Earth
Gekkou	Fujimura-kun Mates		
Gin	The Way of the Househusband	Kousuke Oono	Tatsu and Miku's cat, who freely wanders the neighborhood.
Graystripe	The Lost Warrior	Erin Hunter	Originated in the Warriors novel series.
Heathcliff	Heathcliff	George Gately	Other felines from the strip include: The Catfather.
Heinz	Heinz	René Windig and Eddie de Jong	A grumpy, sarcastic striped cat.
Hessu-Kissa	Hessu-Kissa	Wallu	A grey striped cat whose adventures appear in the pre-school magazine Lastenmaa.
Hercule	Pif le chien	José Cabrero Arnal	Pif's nemesis.
Hershey the Cat/Hershey St. John	Sonic the Hedgehog		A female black and white cat from the Sonic the Hedgehog comics by Archie Comics. She first appeared in the Endgame Saga and was shown as the girlfriend of Drago Wolf, a member of Lupe's Wolf Pack team. Hershey later joins the Royal Secret Service.
Hobbes	Calvin and Hobbes	Bill Watterson	A plush Bengal tiger and best friend of the comic's protagonist, Calvin, Hobbes is perceived by Calvin as being a live tiger, but by every other character as a stuffed toy. Hobbes, whose name is an allusion to political philosopher Thomas Hobbes, often tries to be the voice of reason for Calvin during their numerous adventures.
Isis	DC Comics	Sean Catherine Derek, Laren Bright	The pet cat of Selina Kyle / Catwoman. She was originally created for Batman: The Animated Series.
Jasper	Sam and Silo	Mort Walker & Jerry Dumas	The courthouse cat.
Jaspers/Frigglish	Homestuck	Andrew Hussie	Rose Lalonde's pet, stolen (accidentally) by Roxy Lalonde and subsequently killed. Corpse was returned to Rose.
Jaspersprite	Homestuck	Andrew Hussie	Rose Lalonde's pet, corpse was prototyped and turned into Rose's sprite. Later prototyped again with an eldritch princess sprite.
Jasprosesprite^2	Homestuck	Andrew Hussie	Rose Lalonde's pet, corpse was prototyped and turned into Rose's sprite. Sprite was prototyped and turned into Roxy's sprite. Also contains a godtiered Rose Lalonde corpse and an eldritch princess plush.
Kat	Kat and Kanary	Leo Baxendale and Charles Grigg	A black-and-white cat who lives in never-ending rivalry with a yellow canary. Originally published in The Beano.
Cassandra "Roast Beef" Kazenakis	Achewood	Chris Onstad	
Kitty Puss the Cat	Teddy Tail	Charles Folkard, Harry Folkard, Herbert Sidney Foxwell, Arthur Potts,William St. John Glenn	Friend of Teddy Tail, created by Herbert Sidney Foxwell.
Kitty	Stand Still, Stay Silent	Minna Sundberg	Also known as Missekat, Pusekatt, Kissekatt, Kisu, or Kisa.
Koppy Cat	Slylock Fox & Comics for Kids	Bob Weber Jr.	A cat who is an art forger.
Korky the Cat	Korky the Cat	James Crighton	A black and white cat whose gags ran in The Dandy.
Krosp	Girl Genius	Phil Foglio and Kaja Foglio	Emperor of All Cats.
Krazy Kat	Krazy Kat	George Herriman	Black cat who is in love with Ignatz the mouse. Yet Ignatz always hurles a brick at his head.
Kuro	Blue Exorcist		A black and white cat-sìth with horns and two tails. He can change his size from a normal sized cat to a cat big enough to be ridden on. He's Rin Okumura's familiar.
Kuro	Cyborg Kuro-chan		A black and white tuxedo robotic cat.
Kuro	Love Hina		A black cat
Kuroneko-sama	Trigun		A black cat (also what his name literally means) who appears in every single episode of Trigun.
Liho	Marvel Comics	Nathan Edmondson, Phil Noto	A cat adopted by Natasha Romanoff.
Loedertje	Jack, Jacky and the Juniors (Jan, Jans en de Kinderen)	Jan Kruis	A mischievous Siamese cat and the family's pet.
Ludwig	Arlo and Janis		A ordinary house cat, sometimes treated as a human by Arlo.
Luna	Sailor Moon	Naoko Takeuchi	A black cat that helps Usagi Tsukino to awaken her powers as Sailor Moon.
Maya	Azumanga Daioh		Sakaki's pet Iriomote Cat.
Magdala	Magdala	Andrea Romoli	A curious and naïve female cat.
Maxime	Kramikske	Jean-Pol	The cat of police officer Juffrouw Welgemoedt.
Meebo	Meebo and Zuky	Laura Howell	A cat who lives in constant rivalry with the dog Zuky and often kills him in violent ways. The series is published in The Beano.
Miaowara Tomokato	Samurai Cat		A former samurai serving under Oda Nobunaga who sets off on a quest to avenge the murder of his feudal lord, Tomokato is the main character of a satirical series in which he and his nephew Shiro travel through time and space - including into film universes, and eventually, Hell itself - while massacring a wide variety of fictional and historical figures.
Mikes	Mikes the Cat	Josef Lada	A talking black cat.
Mingus	The Unwritten	Mike Carey	A winged cat who acts as the protagonist's familiar in the Tommy Taylor novels, a fictional 13-part series within the universe of The Unwritten.
Mirliton	Mirliton	Raymond Macherot	A gentle cat unable to hunt as he is best friends with mice and birds.
Mr. Scruffy	The Order of the Stick	Rich Burlew	Belkar Bitterleaf's animal companion.
Myšpulín	Čtyřlístek	Jaroslav Němeček	A scientist.
Nermal	Garfield	Jim Davis	A gray tabby kitten
Omaha	Omaha the Cat Dancer	Reed Waller and Kate Worley	Erotic "furry" comic book character
Pantoufle	Sibylline	Raymond Macherot	A black-and-white cat who serves as the major antagonist in the series. He later received a spin-off comic.
Paulie	Non Sequitur	Wiley Miller	A cat who often sits on Captain Eddie's shoulder
Peekaboo	Rose is Rose	Don Wimmer and Pat Brady	Rose, Jimbo, and Pasquale's cat.
Pickles	Big Nate	Lincoln Peirce	A tuxedo cat that belongs to Francis
Edgar Allan Poes	Jack, Jacky and the Juniors (Jan, Jans en de Kinderen)	Jan Kruis	A red cat who is the pet of the family.
Ponpon	Schanulleke	Eric De Rop and Patty Klein	Orange striped cat who is a good friend of Schanulleke and Duddul.
Pounce De Leon	Homestuck	Andrew Hussie	Nepeta Leijon's parent figure. Killed in a cave-in and later became her sprite.
Poussy	Poussy	Peyo	Black and white cat who has a series of misfortunes.
Preston	The Flibbertys	Ray Helle	The domestic cat of the couple Stan and Fran Flibberty.
Princess Pussycat	Slylock Fox & Comics for Kids	Bob Weber Jr.	
Pusheen	Facebook/Everyday Cute (website)	Claire Belton and Andrew Duff	Chubby gray tabby cat.
Puss	Puss 'n' Boots	John Geering, Morris Heggie.	A black anthropomorphic cat, often in conflict with his rival, Boots the dog.
Rambo	The Middletons	Ralph Dunagin and Dana Summers	The cat of the Wade family.
Raspoutine	Inspector Canardo	Benoît Sokal	Canardo's nemesis.
Patrick Reynolds	Achewood	Chris Onstad	
Rulito	Rulito, el Gato Atorrante	Raúl Roux	Argentine comics series, published in the magazine El Tony in 1928.
Salem Saberhagen	Sabrina, the Teenage Witch		Talking cat, from the comic book, Sabrina, the Teenage Witch and the television series of the same name in 1996, as well as the Sabrina, the Animated Series and its 2003 spinoff.
Molly Sanders	Achewood	Chris Onstad	Wife of Roast Beef
Scourge	The Rise of Scourge	Erin Hunter, Dan Jolley	Originally named Tiny; stray cat who becomes the murderous leader of BloodClan.
Scrameustache	Scrameustache	Gos (Roland Goossens)	An alien who resembles an anthropomorphic cat.
Scratch	Overboard	Chip Dunham	
Scratch	Scratch9		An ordinary house cat who gains the ability summon any of his nine lives to help him out when he is in trouble.
Sebastian	Josie and the Pussycats		
Sénéchal (Ratso)	Cubitus	Dupa	Cubitus' next-door neighbor black-and-white tuxedo cat who acts as his rival.
Shiro Tomokato	The Samurai Cat series		Gun-happy nephew of Miaowara Tomokato, who shares in his uncle's quest out of a love of violence. Even more prone to breaking the Fourth Wall than Tomokato.
Simon's Cat	Simon's Cat	Simon Tofield	His antics, often in the quest for food, vex his owner, Simon. He loves cat food, but also enjoys birds, mice, and fish out of Simon's koi pond.
Simple J. Malarkey	Pogo	Walt Kelly	Cousin of Wiley Catt; a caricature of Senator Joseph McCarthy
Skit	Skit the Kat	Edgar Henry Banger	Gag comics series, which ran between 1940 and 1946
Raymond Quentin Smuckles	Achewood	Chris Onstad	An American Curl cat.
Soapy	Neil the Horse	Arn Saba	A cigar smoking cat.
Solange	9 Chickweed Lane		Siamese cat belonging to Edda Burber.
Splinter	The Timbertoes	John Gee	The cat of the family
Stanislas	Prudence Petitpas	Maurice Maréchal	Prudence's orange cat.
Streaky the Supercat	DC Comics	Jerry Siegel, Jim Mooney	An Earth cat and Supergirl's pet who gained Kryptonian superpowers after being exposed to X-kryptonite.
Superkatt	Giggle Comics	Dan Gordon	A parody of a superhero comic.
Pelle Svanslös	Pelle Svanslös	Gösta Knutsson	An anthropomorphic black and white cat.
Tabby	Moose and Molly	Bob Weber Jr.	
Tim	Tim, Toots & Teeny		Main cast member in a 1929-1937 British comic strip.
Tom Poes (Tom Poes)	Tom Poes	Marten Toonder	A small white cat who acts as the rational counterpart to main character Olivier B. Bommel (Oliver B. Bumble).
Tuffy	Coo Coo Comics		A street cat who chases and antagonizes stray dogs.
Vanilla (Mingau)	Monica's Gang	Mauricio de Sousa	Maggy's pet cat.
Vodka Mutini/Dr. Meowgon Spengler	Homestuck	Andrew Hussie	Mutant kitten adopted and re-adopted throughout the course of Homestuck.
Wiley Catt	Pogo	Walt Kelly	A menacing bobcat.
Willis	Willis the Cat	Nadia Khiari	Cat who rose to become a real-life symbol of rebellion in Tunisia during the Arab Spring.

== See also ==
- List of fictional cats
