= List of fictional rodents in comics =

This list of fictional rodents in comics is subsidiary to list of fictional rodents and covers all rodents appearing in graphic novelizations, manga, comic books and strips. The characters listed here include beavers, chipmunks, gophers, guinea pigs, marmots, prairie dogs, and porcupines, as well as extinct prehistoric species (such as Rugosodon).

== Mice and rats ==
Character/s	Species	Comic	Creator	Notes
Anathème Percemiche	Rat	Sibylline	Raymond Macherot	A huge black rat, who is the major antagonist in the series.
Anthracite	Rat	Chlorophylle	Raymond Macherot	A huge black rat who is Chlorophylle's nemesis.
Argus	Rat	Tom Poes	Marten Toonder	Anthropomorphic rat who works as the sensation-crazy journalist of various newspapers of Rommeldam. He is a nephew of Alexander Pieps.
Atomic Mouse	Mouse	Atomic Mouse	Al Fago	Once a normal mouse, shrunk by an evil magician and given U-235 pills that grant him super powers, which he uses in his fight for justice against the evil Count Gatto.
Baron Rat	Rat	Mr. Crypt	Troy Vevasis, Aleksandar Jovic	Mr. Crypt's pet and best friend, who was discovered in an abandoned shack.
Biggs	Mouse	Donyatsu		
Diddl	Mouse	Diddl	Thomas Goletz	A white 'Jumping Mouse', with big ears and large pink-soled feet allowing him to jump large distances.
Dinkan	Mouse	Dinkan	N. Somashekharan and artist Baby	He was genetically modified with superpowers by experimenting alien scientists.
Dorknoper	Hamster	Tom Poes	Marten Toonder	Anthropomorphic hamster who works as a rule-obsessed government employee.
Gwendolyn	Mouse	Mouse Guard	David Petersen	The supreme matriarch of the Mouse Guard.
Johnny Mouse	Mouse	Johnny Mouse	Clifton Meek	Mouse who inspired Walt Disney to create Mickey Mouse.
Katie Country Mouse	Mouse	The Nursery Rhymes of Katie Country Mouse	Philip Mendoza	Protagonist in a nursery rhyme text comic, published in Tiny Tots.
Lance Lumiere	Mouse	Hoshi no Samidare	Satoshi Mizukami	
Little Cheese	Mouse	Captain Carrot and His Amazing Zoo Crew!	Roy Thomas, Scott Shaw	An anthropomorphic mouse from Earth-C-Minus and a member of the Zoo Crew who gained the ability to shrink after eating experimental cheese. He is later killed by Dark Alley, an evil clone of his teammate Alley-Kat-Abra.
Maisie Mouse	Mouse	Bobby Bear	Kitsie Bridges, Dora McLaren, Wilfred Haughton, Meg.	Friend of Bobby Bear.
Marmaduke Mouse	Mouse	Marmaduke Mouse	Ernie Hart	An adventurous diaper-wearing mouse who serves the lion King Louie. Published by Quality Comics.
Max Mouse	Mouse	Slylock Fox & Comics for Kids	Bob Weber Jr.	Shylock's assistant who corrects his errors. Max wears pink shorts and a matching bowler hat.
Willie Mouse	Mouse	Rupert Bear	Mary Tourtel	A good friend of Rupert.
Minimum	Mouse	Chlorophylle	Raymond Macherot	Best friend of Chlorphylle.
Mitron XIII	Mouse	Chlorophylle	Raymond Macherot	White mouse who is the king of Coquefredouille.
Ol'Mouse	Mouse	Pogo	Walt Kelly	
The Pacush Blues rats	Rats	Pacush Blues	Ptiluc	A group of nameless rats who function as a satirical metaphor for humans.
Alexander Pieps	Mouse	Tom Poes	Marten Toonder	Anthropomorphic mouse who works as an assistant to professor Prlwytzkofsky, yet often sighs that he would rather have a different job. He is a nephew of Argus.
Pip	Mouse	Pellefant	Rune Andréasson	Pellefant's best friend and help in need.
Rat	Rat	Pearls Before Swine	Stephan Pastis	A narcissistic, misanthropic rat, and is an antihero. He frequently breaks the fourth wall, as well as being aware of his status as a fictional character.
Rastus Mouse	Mouse	Rupert Bear	Alfred Bestall	Cousin of Willie Mouse.
Ratbert	Rat	Dilbert	Scott Adams	A rat subject to cruel scientific experiments, but escaped and took refuge in Dilbert's house.
Rat-Man	Rat	Rat-man	Leo Ortolani	Anthropomorphic male rat, an inept superhero originally conceived as a parody of Batman.
Setsuko	Mouse	Cinderalla	Junko Mizuno	
Sibylline	Mouse	Sibylline	Raymond Macherot	Anthropomorphic female mouse who lives in the forest.
Snuffelgraag en Knagelijntje	Mice	Snuffelgraag en Knagelijntje	Gerrit Rotman	Two mice who are siblings. Snuffelgraag is a boy, Knagelijntje a girl. The series was later retitled as Piepneus en Bibbersnoet.
Socratov	Mouse	Birre Beer	Phiny Dick, Ton Beek, Eiso Toonder, Andries Brandt	Good friend of Birre the bear.
Stewart the Rat	Rat	Stewart the Rat	Steve Gerber and Gene Colan	
Space Mouse	Mouse	Space Mouse	Walter Lantz	A space agent who prevents the Felinia cats from invading the mice of Rodentia.
Splinter	Rat	Teenage Mutant Ninja Turtles	Kevin Eastman and Peter Laird	An anthropomorphic rat and the sensei of the Turtles. Splinter was originally depicted as having been a normal rat before his mutation; however, several media adaptations have depicted Splinter as a mutated human, being composited with his owner Hamato Yoshi.
Squeak	Mouse	Garfield	Jim Davis	A semi-regular little grey mouse. Since Garfield is too lazy to be bothered with mousing, he and Squeak have become good friends.
Squeak	Mouse	Squeak the Mouse	Massimo Mattioli	A violent and murderous version of Jerry Mouse who frequently kills the cat, but also gets murdered himself.
Stephanie	Mouse	Winifred and Stephanie	Philip Mendoza	Protagonist in a nursery rhyme text comic, published in Once Upon A Time.
Supermouse	Mouse	Supermouse		Pines comics and Coo Coo comics. His superpowers are activated only by a special kind of cheese.
Taboum	Mouse	Sibylline	Raymond Macherot	Anthropomorphic mouse who is Sibylline's partner.
Teddy Tail	Mouse	Teddy Tail	Charles Folkard, Harry Folkard, Herbert Sidney Foxwell, Arthur Potts, William St. John Glenn	Anthropomorphic forest mouse who has a knot in his tail. His adventures ran in The Daily Mail.
Pastuiven Verkwil	Rat	Tom Poes	Marten Toonder	Anthropomorphic rat who owns a button factory and is quite frustrated and easily agitated.
Mrs. Whisker	Mouse	Teddy Tail	Charles Folkard, Harry Folkard, Herbert Foxwell, Arthur Potts, William St. John Glenn	Guardian figure for Teddy Tail and his friends.
Winifred	Mouse	Winifred and Stephanie	Philip Mendoza	Protagonist in a nursery rhyme text comic, published in Once Upon A Time.
Zedekia Zwederkoorn	Mouse	Tom Poes	Marten Toonder	Anthropomorphic mouse who is an untrustworthy lawyer.
Jerry	Mouse	Tom & Jerry	Hanna-Barbera	Jerry is a mouse who always seems to outwit Tom (the cat) and win.

== Squirrels, chipmunks, and groundhogs ==
Character/s	Species	Comic	Notes
Alicia Acorn	Chipmunk	Sonic the Hedgehog	Sally Acorn's evil Anti-Freedom Fighter counterpart.
Amy the Squirrel	Red squirrel	Sabrina Online	
B'dg	H'lvenite	Green Lantern	A H'lvenite, a rodent-like alien who succeeded Ch'p as a Green Lantern following his death.
Ch'p	H'lvenite	Green Lantern	B'dg's predecessor, who was killed after being struck by a truck.
Doctor Ub'x	H'lvenite	Green Lantern	A mad scientist and Ch'p's archenemy.
Dodger De Squoil	Gray squirrel	Dodger De Squoil	A feisty squirrel with a Brooklyn accent created by Jack Bradbury
Elias Acorn	Ground squirrel	Sonic the Hedgehog	Former Prince, later king and eventually dethroned ruler of the Kingdom of Acorn. His existence was initially unknown to most, as he was thought to have been killed along with his mother by Overlanders. He becomes crowned as the new king after his father abdicates.
Grundoon	Groundhog	Pogo	Walt Kelly
Hammy	American red squirrel	Over the Hedge	Originally known as Sammy
Maximillian Acorn	Chipmunk	Sonic the Hedgehog	King of the Kingdom of Acorn, who is initially trapped within the Zone of Silence after Robotnik's takeover.
Monkey Joe	Squirrel	Marvel Comics	Squirrel Girl's first squirrel companion, who was killed by Leather Boy.
Niki	Squirrel	Fix und Foxi, Niki	Main character in Rolf Kauka's comics.
Portnoy	Groundhog	Bloom County	Surly mouthed groundhog
Sally Acorn	Chipmunk	Sonic the Hedgehog	Co-leader of the Freedom Fighters alongside Sonic, also his love interest.
Spip	Eurasian red squirrel	Spirou et Fantasio	Spirou's grouchy but helpful pet squirrel.
Sunshine Squirrel	Eurasian red squirrel	Acorn Green	A cook
Tippy-Toe	Gray squirrel	Marvel Comics	Squirrel Girl's second close companion.

== Others ==
Character	Species	Comic	Notes
Bruce, Chuck, Clint, and Jackie	Hamster	Adolescent Radioactive Black Belt Hamsters	Originally published by Eclipse Comics, followed by Parody Comics, and currently, Dynamite Entertainment
Chlorophylle	Dormouse	Chlorophylle	The protagonist of the series.
Deacon Mushrat	Muskrat	Pogo	Walt Kelly
Max	Marmot	Max	Pericle Luigi Giovannetti
Gregory Guinea Pig	Guinea pig	Rupert Bear	Friend of Rupert.
Gulliver Guinea-Pig	Guinea pig	Gulliver Guinea-Pig	Protagonist in a text comic written by David Roberts, drawn by Philip Mendoza, continued by Gordon Hutchings.
Miz Beaver	Beaver	Pogo	Walt Kelly
Porky Pine	Porcupine	Pogo	
Pure	Prairie dog	Train*Train	
Tilia	North American beaver	Yakari	An adventurous and humorous youngster who's friends with the title character.
Uncle Baldwin	Porcupine	Pogo	Uncle of Porky Pine.
