= Lancelot Speed =

British painter and illustrator (1860-1931)

- Born: Lancelot Speed; 13 June 1860
- Died: 31 December 1931 (aged 71)

Lancelot Speed (13 June 1860 – 31 December 1931) was a coastal painter and a British illustrator of books in the Victorian era, usually of a fantastical or romantic nature. He is probably most well known for his illustrations for Andrew Lang's fairy story books. Speed is credited as the designer of the 1916 silent film version of the novel She: A History of Adventure by H. Rider Haggard, which he illustrated. He also worked on animated films for Neptune Film Company. His films include French's Contemptible Little Army, the second film in the "Bully Boy Series".

== Early life ==
Speed was born in London on 13 June 1860, the youngest son of William Speed, a Queen's Counsel of the Middle Temple. He attended Rugby School. He was admitted to and matriculated from there in Easter 1881. He was admitted to Clare College, Cambridge, on 27 January 1881, matriculated that Easter, and was awarded a Bachelor of Arts degree in 1885.

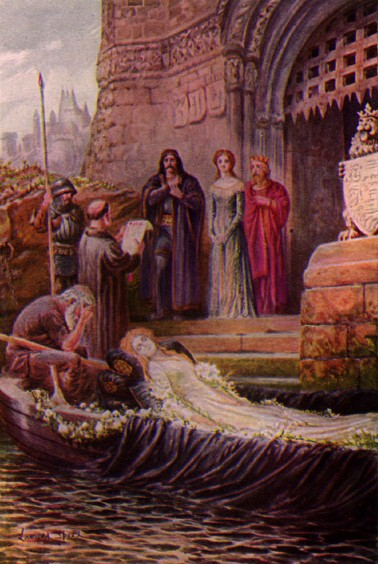
Speed's "Elaine of Astolat" (1919)

== Illustration ==
Speed had no formal art training, but became an illustrator working primarily in black and white. Process engraving particularly suited his fine lines, and he was one of the earlier illustrators to benefit from the new technology.

He lived and worked at Southend-on-Sea, England in the latter part of his life.

== Films ==
He was also the director of several early British silent films.

- Britain's Efforts
- The Wonderful Adventures of Pip, Squeak and Wilfred series
  - The Wonderful Adventures of Pip, Squeak And Wilfred
  - Pip And Wilfred Detectives
  - Wilfred's Wonderful Adventures
  - Over The Edge of the World
  - Popski's Early Life
  - The Castaways
  - The Six-Armed Image
  - Trouble in the Nursery
  - Ups And Downs
  - Wilfred's Nightmare
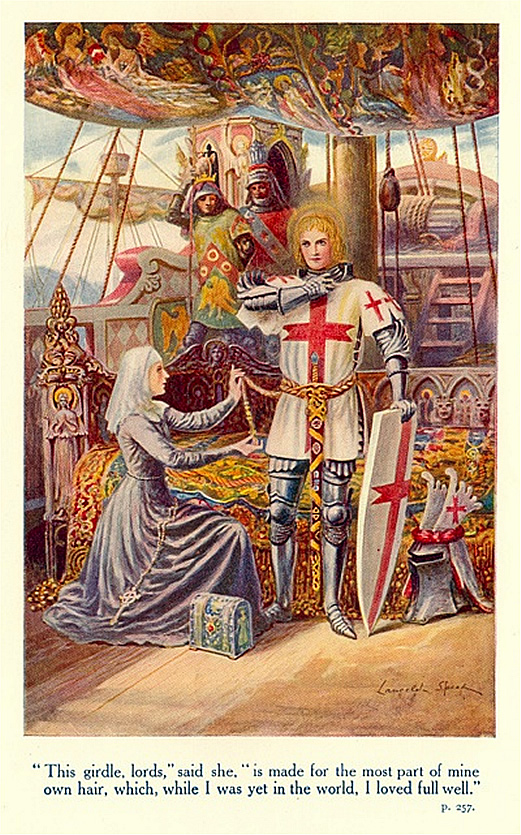
    Lancelot through with Guinevere by Lancelot Speed

Lancelot Speed's cartoon work is the source of the nickname for the colourful commander of the World War II Special Forces unit "Popski's Private Army". Lieutenant Colonel Vladimir Peniakoff, DSO MC, a Belgian of White Russian descent, was called "Popski" by Bill Kennedy Shaw, the Intelligence Officer of the Long Range Desert Group because his signallers had trouble with the spelling of his surname. Peniakoff earned early notoriety (and his MC) with his behind-the-lines raids to blow up German petrol dumps, transported there and back, in some exasperation, by the LRDG.

In the Pip, Squeak and Wilfred adventures before the start of World War II, there were two hairy characters: one was a scheming, plotting, bomb-throwing Bolshevik, and the other was his dog. The mad Russian was called "Professor Wtzkoffski" and the dog was called "Popski". These cartoon characters in the Daily Mirror were well known to all the soldiers, and in his best-selling book about his small irregular unit, "Popski" said, "...I was delighted with my nickname...".

== Death ==
Speed died at Deal, Kent on 31 December 1931 (Note: Houfe incorrectly gives the date of his death as 21 December 1931.) and was buried at Knowlton, Kent, England. His estate was valued at just over £265.
