= Popski's Private Army =

No. 1 Demolition Squadron Popski's Private Army (PPA)
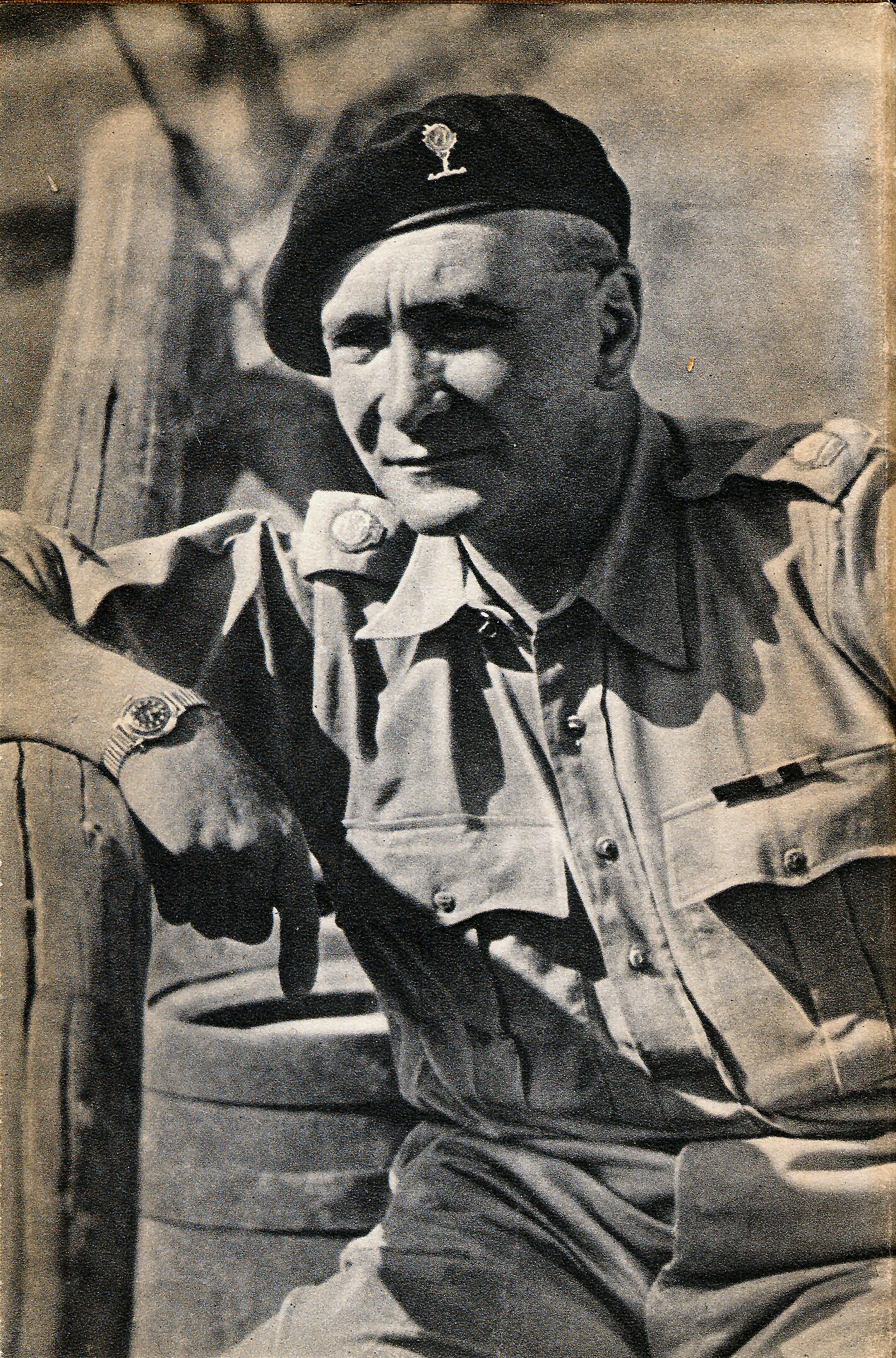
- Vladimir "Popski" Peniakoff
- Active: 10 December 1942–14 September 1945
- Country: United Kingdom
- Branch: British Army
- Type: Special Forces
- Role: Reconnaissance; Raiding; Counter-demolition
- Size: 80 men
- Part of: Eighth Army
- Nickname: "Popski's Private Army"
- Engagements: Second World War; North African Campaign; Italian Campaign

Commanders
- Notable commanders: Vladimir Peniakoff

Insignia
- Identification symbol: Astrolabe
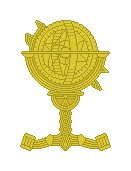
- No. 1 Demolition Squadron cap badge

Popski's Private Army, officially No. 1 Demolition Squadron, PPA, was a unit of British Special Forces set up in Cairo in October 1942 by Major Vladimir Peniakoff (nickname "Popski") who was a Belgian Jewish officer of Russian extraction. Under the name of "Popski's Private Army" it was one of several raiding units formed in the Western Desert during the Second World War. The squadron also served in Italy, and was disbanded in September 1945.

No. 1 Demolition Squadron was formed specifically to attack Field Marshal Rommel's fuel supplies, in support of General Montgomery’s offensive at El Alamein, at the suggestion of Lieutenant-Colonel John Hackett. The unit became operational on 10 December 1942 as an 8th Army Special Forces unit. After the Long Range Desert Group (LRDG) and the Special Air Service (SAS), PPA was the last and smallest of the three main irregular raiding, reconnaissance, and intelligence units formed during the North African Campaign.

Actor Christopher Lee, who served as an RAF intelligence officer during the Second World War was attached as liaison officer to this unit.

== Background ==
When the Second World War broke out, the 42-year-old Peniakoff applied to serve in the Royal Air Force, and the Royal Navy, but was rejected. He was accepted by the British Army, and assigned to garrison duties as an Arabic-speaking junior officer in the Libyan Arab Force (LAF). Not satisfied, Popski left his post and formed the Libyan Arab Force Commando (LAFC), a small group of British and Libyan soldiers who operated behind the lines in the Jebel Akhdar area of Cyrenaica.

On his return to Cairo in the middle of 1942, Peniakoff was invited to join a Long Range Desert Group (LRDG) raid in the area he had just left. In doing so, he learned much about German and Italian procedures, but also lost his left little finger to an Italian bullet. He was awarded the Military Cross (MC) for his previous intelligence reporting and petrol dump raiding while leading the LAFC for three months behind enemy lines, and for the operation with the LRDG. While he was away, the LAFC was disbanded. He was given the nickname Popski, from a Daily Mirror cartoon character, by Captain Bill Kennedy Shaw (the LRDG's Intelligence Officer) because his signallers had problems with the name "Peniakoff." In fact, Popski was born of Russian Jewish parents who had emigrated to Belgium, although he was educated in Britain; Willet's book on Popski includes many interviews with his Jewish family.

== Formation, and initial actions ==
Shortly after this No. 1 Demolition Squadron was formed, the smallest independent unit of the British Army at 23 men all-ranks. The original officers of the unit were three friends who had served together in the Libyan Arab Force: Popski, Robert Park Yunnie and Jean Caneri.

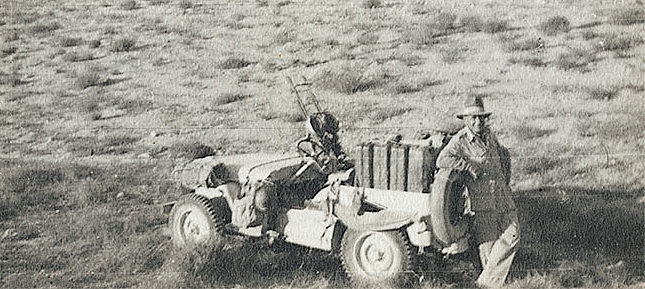
Vladimir Peniakoff with his jeep during the raid on Barce.

Lieutenant Colonel John Hackett, who co-ordinated British raiding operations, asked Peniakoff to give the new unit a cover name, but vacillated. The unit's name ultimately came from Hackett's exasperation at Popski's delay: "You had better find a name quick or we shall call you Popski's Private Army"—"I'll take it". PPA was unusual in that all officer recruits reverted to lieutenant on joining, and other ranks reverted to private. The unit was run quite informally: there was no saluting and no drill, officers and men messed together, every man was expected to know what to do and get on with it, and there was only one punishment for failure of any kind: to be immediately returned to unit. It was also efficient, having an unusually small headquarters.

Events proceeded rapidly; the Germans and Italians were expelled from Egypt and Libya shortly after PPA became active. A joint LRDG-PPA patrol discovered the gap in the mountains that let Bernard Montgomery launch an outflanking move around Erwin Rommel's defence at the Mareth Line. The PPA was also among the first elements of Eighth Army (moving west) to link up with the British First Army and American II Corps (advancing east) in Tunisia in early 1943. Many PPA raiding and reconnaissance operations were carried out around the time of the Battle of Kasserine Pass, including taking the surrender of 600 Italians.

The summer of 1943 was spent in Algeria and Tunisia recruiting and training new volunteers from the LRDG, SAS, Commandos and Royal Armoured Corps for the fight in Italy, bringing the unit's size up to about 35 all ranks, with two fighting patrols and a small HQ. For a short while PPA experimented with using 1st Airborne Division's gliders to deliver them and their jeeps behind the Axis lines in Sicily, but their part in that operation was cancelled at the last minute.

== Italy ==
In September 1943 an advance patrol of PPA sailed to Taranto on board the USS Boise and headed inland, where they discovered the hitherto unknown weakness of the German 1st Parachute Division opposing 1st Airborne. As a result of this success Popski was allowed to increase the size of PPA to 80 all ranks; throughout the Italian Campaign about 100 men were actually deployed at any one time.

Three fighting patrols, each of 18 men in six jeeps, and one Tactical HQ patrol of four jeeps were formed and given great autonomy. Each jeep was armed with .50in and .30in machine guns, giving the patrols immense firepower for their size. The men trained hard for amphibious, mountain and parachute operations, demolition and counter-demolition, reconnaissance and intelligence gathering.

They were deployed in many roles, often clandestine, and for several months even operated as regular front line troops, holding a sector of the Allied front line, badly depleted after the withdrawal of forces for the D-Day landings in Normandy, nipping around in their jeeps to fool the Germans into believing that they were opposed by much larger units.

Several operations used DUKWs or small landing craft called RCLs (manned by 7 Royal Engineers who became known as "Popski’s Private Navy") with sapper John Francis Dobinson to sail up the Adriatic and get behind the German front line, escorted by the Royal Navy’s Coastal Forces.

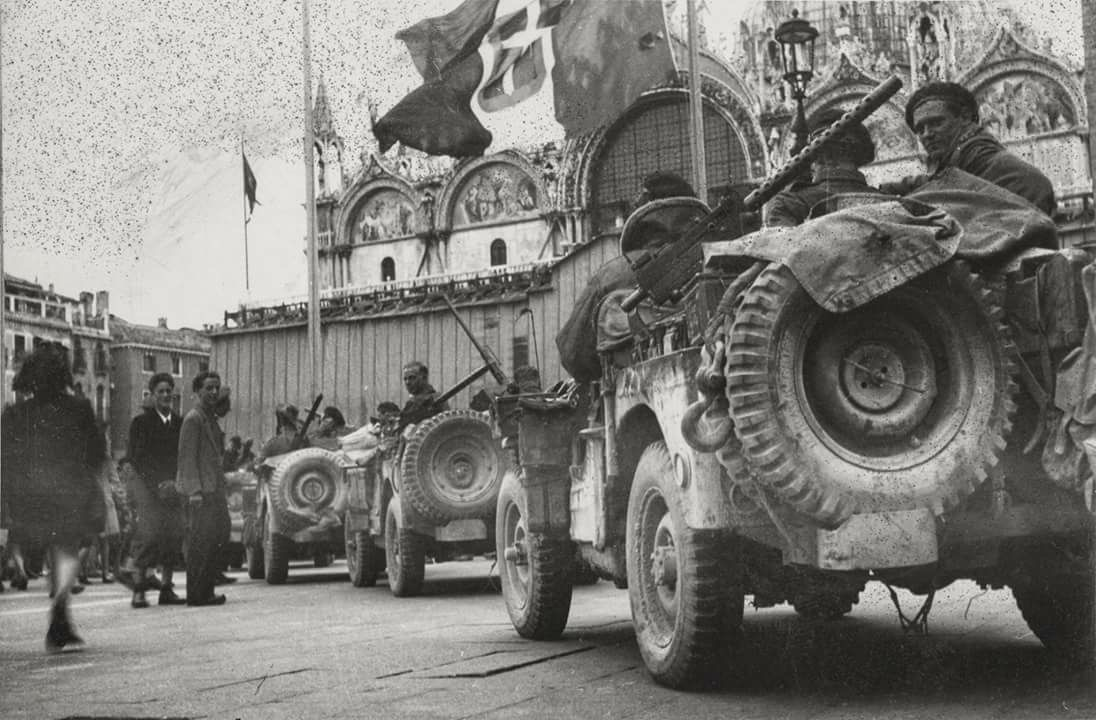
British troops in Italy, 1945.

Throughout the bitter winter weather and fighting of 1944 and 1945 PPA undertook their operations ahead of regular forces, in support of British, Canadian, Indian and Polish armoured, infantry and commando units. They located targets for the Allied Air Force, chased Germans out of rear-areas, saved bridges, captured many prisoners and guns, and accepted the surrender of the entire German garrison at Chioggia.

At various times PPA worked alongside other secret units such as the LRDG, SAS, No. 1 Special Force (SOE), Phantom, ‘A’ Force and Office of Strategic Services. Along the way they adopted many strays, including Russian, Italian and German POWs, Italian regulars and partisans, both royalist and communist.

Popski was awarded the Distinguished Service Order (DSO) in November 1944, during joint operations (such as “Porterforce”) with the 27th Lancers and Italian partisans of the 28th Garibaldi Brigade, to liberate Ravenna. Shortly afterwards he lost his left hand to a German rifle-grenade.

At the end of the war Popski’s Private Army sailed some of their jeeps on RCLs to Venice, where they drove around St. Mark's Square, the only wheeled vehicles ever to have been there. The unit was disbanded four months later on 14 September 1945, after hunting for Himmler, disarming Italian partisans and discouraging Josip Broz Tito’s partisans from encroaching on Austrian and Italian territory.

By this time PPA personnel had gained between them a DSO, a Distinguished Conduct Medal, 6 MCs, 10 MMs, and 14 Mentions in Despatches; King George VI had personally requested an account of the unit’s exploits.

== See also ==
- Private army

== Notes ==
This text is adapted from the "PPA Story" on two plaques at the PPA Memorial in the Allied Special Forces Grove at the National Memorial Arboretum.

== Select bibliography ==
This list includes the first edition of each of 'the big five' books on PPA, starting with Popski's own bestseller. Since the early editions are hard to find, a recent edition is also listed for each book: where these have been retitled, the changed title is listed.

Lieutenant-Colonel Vladimir Peniakoff DSO MC

- Peniakoff, Vladimir (1950). Private Army. Jonathan Cape.

--- Private Army. Jonathan Cape. 2nd Edition, foreword by General Sir John Hackett, minor revisions, 1951.
--- Popski's Private Army. Cassell Military Paperbacks, 2004. ISBN 0-304-36143-7.
Translated into Swedish (1951), German (1951), Italian (1951), French (1953), Hebrew (1954), Spanish (1955), Serbo-Croat (1957).

Captain Robert Park Yunnie MC, Popski's second in command, leader of "B" patrol

- Yunnie, Park (1959). Warriors on Wheels. Hutchinson.

--- Fighting with Popski's Private Army. Greenhill Books, 2002. ISBN 1-85367-500-8.

Corporal Ben Owen, Yunnie's gunner

- Owen, Ben (1993). With Popski's Private Army. Janus Publishing.

--- Astrolabe Publishing, 2006. Available from the Friends of Popski's Private Army.

Lieutenant-Colonel John Willett, friend of Popski, intelligence officer in 8th Army

- Willett, John (1954). Popski, a life of Vladimir Peniakoff. MacGibbon and Kee.

Signalman Les White, signaller in "S" Patrol.

- White, Les (2004). From the Workhouse to Vienna. Cassell Military Paperbacks. ISBN 0-304-36143-7.

Captain John Campbell, leader of "S" Patrol.

- Rayment, Sean (2013). Tales from the Special Forces Club. Collins. ISBN 978-0-00745-253-8.

== Articles ==
- Silvio Tasselli, Popski's Private Army (P.P.A.) - Rivista Storica n. 9 - Novembre 1994 (Italian)
