= Léonard (comics) =

Belgian comic series

Léonard est toujours un Génie (French for "Leonardo is still a genius"), book cover showing the two main protagonists of the series

Léonard in French, and Leonardo in the Dutch translation, is a Belgian comic series about an eponymous inventor and his assistant. It was created by artist Philippe Liégeois and writer Bob de Groot, better known under their pen names "Turk & De Groot".

== Publication history ==
Inspired by Leonardo da Vinci, the character first appeared in Achille Talon magazine in 1974. When the magazine folded in 1976, the series moved to Eppo for the Dutch version and Pif gadget for the French. He later appeared in book form and has been drawn by the same duo for over 30 years with a similar number of books.

The stories are usually short ones ranging from one to half-a-dozen or so pages, though there have been the occasional full-length adventures.

All the albums have been published by Lombard Editions in Brussels, Belgium, and by Dargaud in Paris, France. At least four albums have been translated into English, but all are currently out-of-print. The character name was changed to Leonardo. Titles include "Leonardo is a Genius", Leonardo is Still a Genius", "Leonardo:Non-stop Genius" and "Leonardo: Who is This Guy Anyway".

== Plot ==
Léonard is set in the early Renaissance period (with some aspects of the 20th century thrown in). He is an inventor and self-proclaimed genius who lives in a small town where he comes up with all sorts of inventions. Most of these are based on more recent, real-life achievements including television, fire extinguishers, cars and planes. He has also made more fanciful inventions like time machines and robots.

Léonard is flanked by Basile, his long-suffering (and often quite reluctant) assistant. Léonard refers to his younger helper as "Disciple" ("Lackey" in the English version), while Basile calls him "Master".

Basile shows, and not without good cause, little of the respect that Léonard feels due to him and their relationship is more one of squabbling worker and employer than that of pupil and mentor. One cannot blame the Disciple given the Master's arrogance and oversized ego.

In fact, far from teaching his Disciple the ways of science, Léonard looks upon him as a convenient guinea-pig for his inventions and shows little sympathy when they go wrong, which they almost always do. Still, Léonard expects his Disciple to be enthusiastic about his inventions, and the resigned Disciple often ironically repeats his motto "I serve science and it's my joy" (" Je sers la science et c'est ma joie ").

== Storyline ==
The most common storyline is that Léonard comes up with the idea for an invention. He then proceeds to wake up his late-sleeping Disciple using various means which range from loudspeakers to explosives. After being blown to bits or suffering similar injuries, the Disciple gets himself together and grudgingly proceeds to help build and test Léonard's latest idea. This invariably results in more damage to his body and soul, but failure to co-operate will result in him being on the receiving end of Léonard's anvil or blunderbuss which the Master keeps conveniently tucked up in his beard. The story often ends with the Disciple covered in plaster and bandages and even having to go to hospital.

== Other characters ==
Looking on are Raoul the cat, Bernadette the mouse, and Mathurine the housekeeper. The cat and the mouse are friends and often appear in on-the-side gags: while the main action is being played out by Léonard and his Disciple, the cat and the mouse are involved in action of their own. Another recurring character is Crâne, a talking skull who comments on the scene.

There is also a rival inventor, the Great Albert (based on Albert Einstein) who also has an assistant who is every bit as put-upon as Basile. Albert, who is in every way as brilliant and as arrogant as Léonard, first appeared in a full-length adventure entitled La Guerre des génies (French for "Genius Wars") – which included a chapter called "Le Génie contre-attaque" ("The Genius Strikes Back"). Deciding that the town was not big enough for two geniuses, he and Léonard engaged in a fiery feud with both of them coming up with increasingly devastating methods to try to get rid of the other. Running gags in the story included the angry inhabitants chasing both Leonardo and Albert out of town and both men joining forces on occasion to get rid of another passing genius, Nicolas Flamel, and his disciple. Although this story was entirely about the two fighting a huge battle, in later albums they are shown to be on more or less friendly terms.

== Cartoon series ==
A pilot for a series was made at the beginning of the 1990s by the French cartoon company IDDH, but the full series was never made.

A CGI-animated cartoon television series which was named Léonard with a 3D graphic style similar to the one previously used in the animated series The Garfield Show was announced in February 2009, with Paris-based aniamtion studio Ellipsanime in colloabortation with the comic book series' publisher Le Lombard while the series was also named Contraptus outside of France, Ellipsanime's co-founder Robért Rea would serve as producer. Ellipsanime's fellow Belgian animation studio DreamWall and Singaporian animation production studio Infinite Frameworks would provide animation services for Léonard (aka Contraptus).

== See also ==
- Cultural references to Leonardo da Vinci

== Sources ==
- http://www.bdparadisio.com/scripts/detail.cfm?Id=271 (in French)
- http://www.bedetheque.com/auteur-298-BD-De-Groot-Bob.html (in French)
- http://www.bedetheque.com/serie-125-BD-Leonard.html (in French)
- http://www.bdtheque.com/main.php?bdid=252&action=2 (in French)
- https://lambiek.net/artists/d/de-groot_bob.htm (in English)
- https://lambiek.net/artists/t/turk.htm (in English)
