= Clifton (comics) =

Franco-Belgian comics series

Colonel Clifton
- Main character Colonel Clifton with the logo of the series

Publication information
- Publisher: Lombard Editions (French); Cinebook (English)
- Format: Ongoing series
- Genre: Humor comics
- No. of issues: 24 (in French); 8 (in English)

Creative team
- Created by: Raymond Macherot
- Written by: De Groot
- Artist: Turk

Clifton is a Franco-Belgian comics series in the humorous spy-genre, featuring the exploits of Colonel Sir Harold Wilberforce Clifton. It was created by Raymond Macherot in 1959, and has since passed on to other artists and writers. Over the fifty years of publication of the Clifton series, approximately twenty albums and twenty smaller stories have been published, totalling about 800 pages.

== Character ==
A British colonel, retired from MI5, though sometimes still active for the British government, Clifton functions as an amateur sleuth, trying to maintain a stiff upper lip, although the pressure involved frequently makes him lose his cool. Harold Clifton lives in Puddington, near London, supported by housekeeper Miss Partridge, who makes a prize-winning goulash. Clifton drives a red MG TD from the early fifties, which gets mangled in most stories, but is repaired regardless of cost. Clifton's hobbies include Boy Scouting (he's Boy Scoutmaster Singing Heron), cats, and collecting cigar wraps. In Passé Composé it was established that Clifton served in the RAF as a group captain during World War II before joining the Secret Service. He also ascended to knighthood in the issue Mortelle Saison for saving a member of the Royal family.

Clifton's amateur sleuthing leads him to investigate many cases, often with the police or MI5. His main contact at MI5 is Colonel Donald Spruce who often calls on him to deal with delicate missions. Spruce is the sort of man who would be perfectly capable of handling the missions himself if not for a leg injury which has left him partly disabled.

== Publication history ==
It was originally Raymond Macherot who created the Colonel Clifton character, and the first story was published in the Franco-Belgian comics magazine Tintin on 16 December 1959. In preliminary studies, Macherot had used Colonel Horatio Amaory Crickett as a working name, but before the first story decided on Colonel Clifton instead. Clifton's first names Harold Wilberforce were not mentioned until the second story. After three stories, published in 1959–1960, Macherot went on to do other work, and eventually left Tintin for the competitor Spirou magazine, leaving behind his Tintin-owned work. Clifton was shelved for six years.

In 1969, artist Jo-El Azara and writer Greg revived the series with the short story Les lutins diaboliques. In 1972, writer Greg and new artist Turk did the story Le voleur qui rit. In 1974, artist Turk and new writer De Groot (who had collaborated on the Clifton short-story Le mystère de la voix qui court in 1970), started the story Alias Lord X, and that duo began a long-lasting collaboration on eight Clifton volumes.

In 1983, Bédu took over the artwork from Turk and worked with De Groot until the 1990s. In 1991, Bédu became responsible for both artwork and scenario with the story Le clan Mc Gregor, the last story serialised in French Tintin, and continued to work alone for the following two stories published directly to albums.

In 2003, after a long inactive period, Rodrigue collaborated with Bob de Groot who returned to write Clifton scripts, and seven volumes have been published since.

== Timeline of major stories ==
Artist	Scenarist	Year*	FR title	NL title	EN title
Raymond Macherot	Macherot	1959	Les enquêtes du colonel Clifton	De onderzoekingen van kolonel Clifton	Colonel Clifton's Inquiries
Macherot	Macherot	1960	Clifton à New York	Clifton in New York	Clifton in New York
Macherot	Macherot	1960	Clifton et les espions	Clifton en de spionnen	Clifton and the Spies
Jo-El Azara	Greg	1969	Les lutins diaboliques [short story]	De duivelse dwergen	The Evil Elves
Turk	De Groot	1970	Le mystère de la voix qui court [short story]	Het geheim van de rennende stem	The Mystery of the Running Voice
Turk	Greg	1972	Le voleur qui rit	De lachende dief	The Laughing Thief
Turk	De Groot	1974	Alias Lord X	Alias Lord X	Alias Lord X
Turk	De Groot	1975	Sir Jason	Sir Jason	Sir Jason
Turk	De Groot	1976	Ce cher Mr Wilkinson	Dear Mr Wilkinson	My Dear Wilkinson
Turk	De Groot	1978	7 jours pour mourir	7 dagen om te sterven	7 Days to Die
Turk	De Groot	1979	Atout...coeur!	Hartkloppingen!	The Heart Attack Caper
Turk	De Groot	1980	Une panthère pour le colonel	Een panter voor de kolonel	A Panther for the Colonel
Turk	De Groot	1982	Weekend à tuer	Weekend om te doden	Weekend to Kill
Turk	De Groot	1983	Kidnapping	Kidnapping	Kidnapping
Bédu	De Groot	1984	Passé composé	Uit de oude doos	Perfect Tense
Bédu	De Groot	1986	La mémoire brisée	Geheugenverlies	The Broken Memory
Bédu	De Groot	1987	Dernière séance	Laatste voorstelling	Last Session
Bédu	De Groot	1990	Matoutou-falaise	Matoutou-falaise	Matoutou-cliff
Bédu	Bédu	1991	Le clan Mc Gregor	De Mc Gregor clan	The Mc Gregor Clan
Bédu	Bédu	1992	Mortelle saison	Een fataal spel	Deadly Season
Bédu	Bédu	1995	Le baiser du cobra	De kus van de cobra	The Kiss of the Cobra
Rodrigue	De Groot	2003	Jade	Jade	Jade
Rodrigue	De Groot	2005	Lune noire	Zwarte maan	Black Moon
Rodrigue	De Groot	2006	Elementaire, mon cher Clifton	Elementary, my dear Clifton!	Elementary, My Dear Clifton
Rodrigue	Rodrigue	2008	Ballade Irlandaise	Een Iers uitje	Irish Ballad
Turk	Zidrou	2016	Clifton et les gauchers contrariés	Spookrijders onder invloed	Clifton and the Left-Handers Thwarted
Turk	Zidrou	2017	Just married	Just married	
Turk	Zidrou	2023	Le dernier des Clifton		

*Denotes original year of publication until Tintin ceased to be published, and Clifton no longer serialised

== Publications in magazines and other media ==
The cartoonists worked with original French language stories, whereas all were published simultaneously in French and Dutch, the two main Belgian languages, in the weekly magazines Tintin / Kuifje (French / Dutch edition of the same magazine), Junior (French) and Ons Volkske (Dutch), all published by Lombard Editions in Brussels. Clifton also ran in other magazines, across Europe such as the German publications Zack and YPS.

Beside French and Dutch, the stories have been translated into Finnish, Portuguese, Danish, Swedish, Norwegian, English and German (where in most publications Clifton is named Percy Pickwick).

In 1984, a six minutes long Clifton theatrical animated short film was made by Belvision Studios as one of the studios' final productions in the 1980s, the film department of Lombard. The cartoon was based on the short story "Un pépin pour Clifton" (French) / "Onder Cliftons Paraplu" or "Pech voor Clifton" (Dutch) (Lit. "Bad luck for Clifton"/"Under Clifton's umbrella") by Turk and De Groot. The animation was produced by Michel Leloupe, with Anthony Hamilton voicing Clifton.

=== English translations ===
Cover to My Dear Wilkinson (1976, trans. 2005), the first album that was released in English

The series have been translated into English by Cinebook Ltd, a British publisher specializing in Franco-Belgian comics. So far, eight books have been translated.

1. My Dear Wilkinson, 2005, ISBN 978-1-905460-06-9
2. The Laughing Thief, 2005, ISBN 978-1-905460-07-6
3. 7 Days To Die, 2006, ISBN 978-1-905460-08-3
4. Black Moon, 2007, ISBN 978-1-905460-30-4
5. Jade, 2008, ISBN 978-1-905460-52-6
6. Kidnapping, 2009, ISBN 978-1-905460-87-8
7. Elementary, My Dear Clifton, 2014, ISBN 978-1-849181-98-3
8. Sir Jason, 2018, ISBN 978-1-84918-407-6

== See also ==
• Marcinelle school
