= Libyan Arab Force =

Volunteer army in Libya (1941–1951)

The Libyan Arab Force was a military force of the British Army which was active in World War II, established on August 3-4, 1940. It consisted of five infantry battalions made up of volunteers primarily among Libyan exiles living in Egypt. With the exception of one military engagement near Benghazi, this force's role did not extend beyond rear-echelon and gendarmerie duties. It was initially known as the British Arab Force and was renamed the Cyrenaica Defence Force in March 1943.

== Background ==
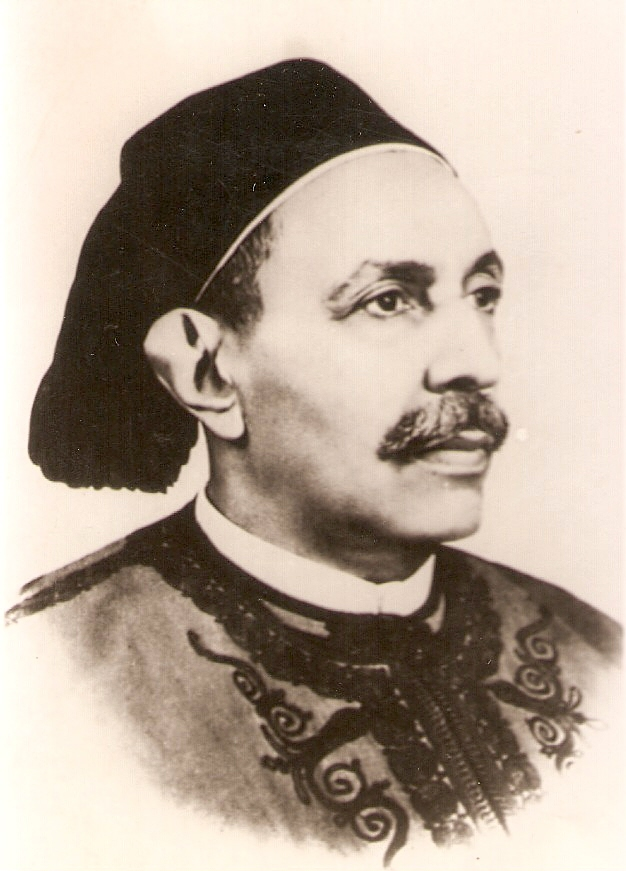
Idris of Libya, pictured c.1951

Following the outbreak of World War II in 1939, Idris of Libya sided with the British Empire in the hope of expelling the Italians from Libya. He argued that if the Italians were victorious the situation for the Libyan people would be no different than before the war. Delegates from both the Cyrenaicans and Tripolitanians agreed that Idris should conclude agreements with the British that they would gain independence in return for support during the war. Vladimir Peniakoff was commissioned as a second lieutenant and served in the Libyan Arab Force, before creating a unit known as Popski's Private Army.

Shortly after Italy entered the war, a number of Libyan leaders living in exile in Egypt called on their compatriots to organise themselves into military units and join the British in the war against the Axis powers. Five battalions, which were initially designed for guerrilla warfare in the Jabal al Akhdar region of Cyrenaica, were established under British command. Because the high mobility of the desert campaigns required a considerable degree of technical and mechanical expertise, the Libyan forces were used primarily as auxiliaries, guarding military installations and prisoners. At least three battalions participated in the fighting at the Siege of Tobruk (April–November 1941).

After the British retreat from Cyrenaica during Operation Sonnenblume (6 February – 25 May 1941) the military administration of Cyrenaica lapsed. In the course of 1941, the British proposed to send the Libyan Arab Force to Syria. In the autumn preparations were made for the administration of Cyrenaica again once it had been reoccupied. On 14 October, GHQ Middle East revived a small military administration for Cyrenaica commanded by Brigadier Stephen Longrigg. A small number of people were transferred to 102 Military Mission which had trained the British Senussi Army, later called the Libyan Arab Force. The new establishment began on 19 December at the fall of Derna.

After Britain occupied Cyrenaica, the need for the British-trained and equipped Sanusi troops appeared to be over. The Sanusi Army was reluctant to disband and the majority of its members arranged to be transferred to the local police force in Cyrenaica under the British military administration. It was finally disbanded in August and September 1943. When Libya gained its independence in 1951, veterans of the Libyan Arab Force formed the nucleus of the Royal Libyan Army.

== Bibliography ==
- Metz, Helen Chapin, ed. (1989). Libya: A Country Study. Area Handbook. Library of Congress. Federal Research Division.
- Rodd, F. (1970) [1948]. British Military Administration of Occupied Territories in Africa during the Years 1941–1947 (repr. Greenwood Press, CT ed.). London: HMSO. OCLC 1056143039.
- Vandewalle, Dirk (2006). A History of Modern Libya. Cambridge: Cambridge University Press. ISBN 978-0521615549.
