= Bob de Groot =

Belgian comics artist and writer (1941–2023)

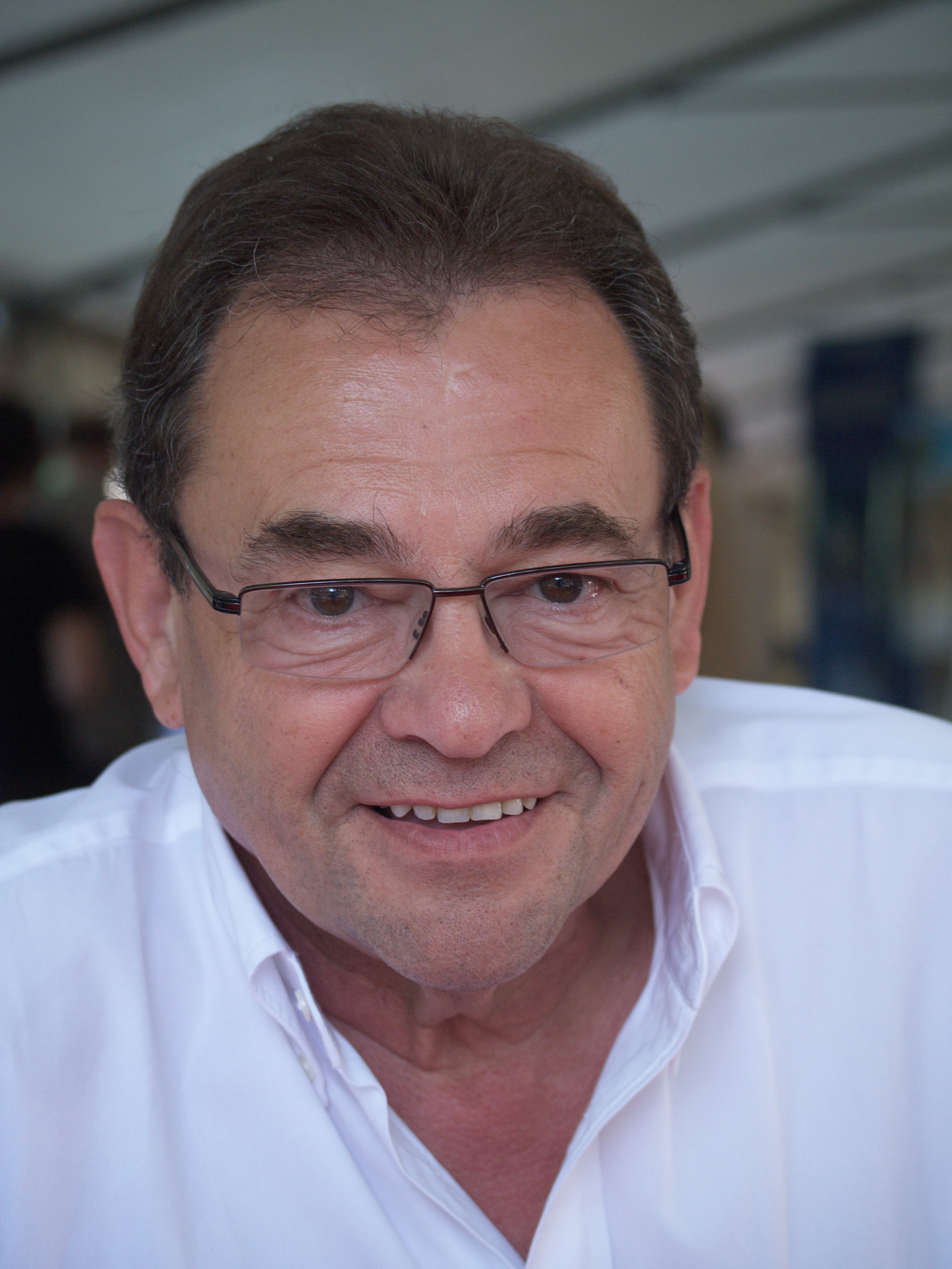
- De Groot in 2010
- Born: 26 October 1941 Brussels, German-occupied Belgium
- Died: 17 November 2023 (aged 82) Ottignies, Belgium
- Areas: Artist, writer

Robert de Groot (26 October 1941 – 17 November 2023) was a Belgian comic books artist and writer.

== Career ==
While still a young art student de Groot got his first comics experience as an assistant to Maurice Tillieux on Félix. He began creating shorter work for the Franco-Belgian comics magazine Pilote, with creators such as Hubuc, Reiser. With Fred as scenarist he drew the strip 4 × 8 = 32 L'Agent Caméléon in the late 1960s. When the artist Turk joined to assist on the series, de Groot gradually took on increasing amounts of work as scenarist and went on to collaborate with Turk on several series, including Archimède, Robin Dubois and eventually Raymond Macherot's Clifton. They also created the character Léonard for Achille Talon magazine in 1974, before de Groot began a prolific production of comics scenarios for many comics artists, including Tibet, Dupa, Philippe Francq, Greg and Dany. With Rodrigue he created Doggyguard and continued the Clifton series, and with Morris he collaborated on stories for Lucky Luke and Rantanplan.

== Death ==
Bob de Groot died at Ottignies on 17 November 2023, at the age of 82.

== Bibliography ==
Series	Years	Volumes	Scenarist or Artist	Editor	Remarks
Alice au pays des merveilles	1973	1	Greg (writer)	Le Lombard and Dargaud	Artwork in collaboration with Dany, Dupa and Turk
Ça vous intéresse	1990	1	Dany (artist)	P & T Productions	This volume written by De Groot, rest of series by different writers
Chlorophylle	1977–1986	3	Dupa and Walli (artists)	Le Lombard	Series started by Raymond Macherot
Clifton	1973–1984	9	Turk (artist)	Le Lombard and Dargaud	Series started by Raymond Macherot
Des villes et des femmes	1987–1988	2	Philippe Francq (artist)	Dargaud	
Digitaline	1989	1	J. Landrain (artist)	Le Lombard	First bande dessinée completely made by computer
Doggyguard	1999–2000	3	M. Rodrigue (artist)	Le Lombard	

== Sources ==
- Bob de Groot publications in Spirou Archived 10 July 2007 at the Wayback Machine, Pilote Archived 10 July 2007 at the Wayback Machine, Vaillant and Pif Archived 7 June 2007 at the Wayback Machine, Belgian Tintin Archived 30 September 2007 at the Wayback Machine and French Tintin Archived 8 September 2007 at the Wayback Machine, BDoubliées (in French)
- Béra, Michel; Denni, Michel; and Mellot, Philippe (2002): "Trésors de la Bande Dessinée 2003–2004". Paris, Les éditions de l'amateur. ISBN 2-85917-357-9
- Matla, Hans: "Stripkatalogus 9: De negende dimensie". Panda, Den Haag, 1998. ISBN 90-6438-111-9
