= Vladimir Peniakoff =

Belgian soldier (1897–1951)

Lieutenant-Colonel Vladimir Peniakoff DSO MC FRGS
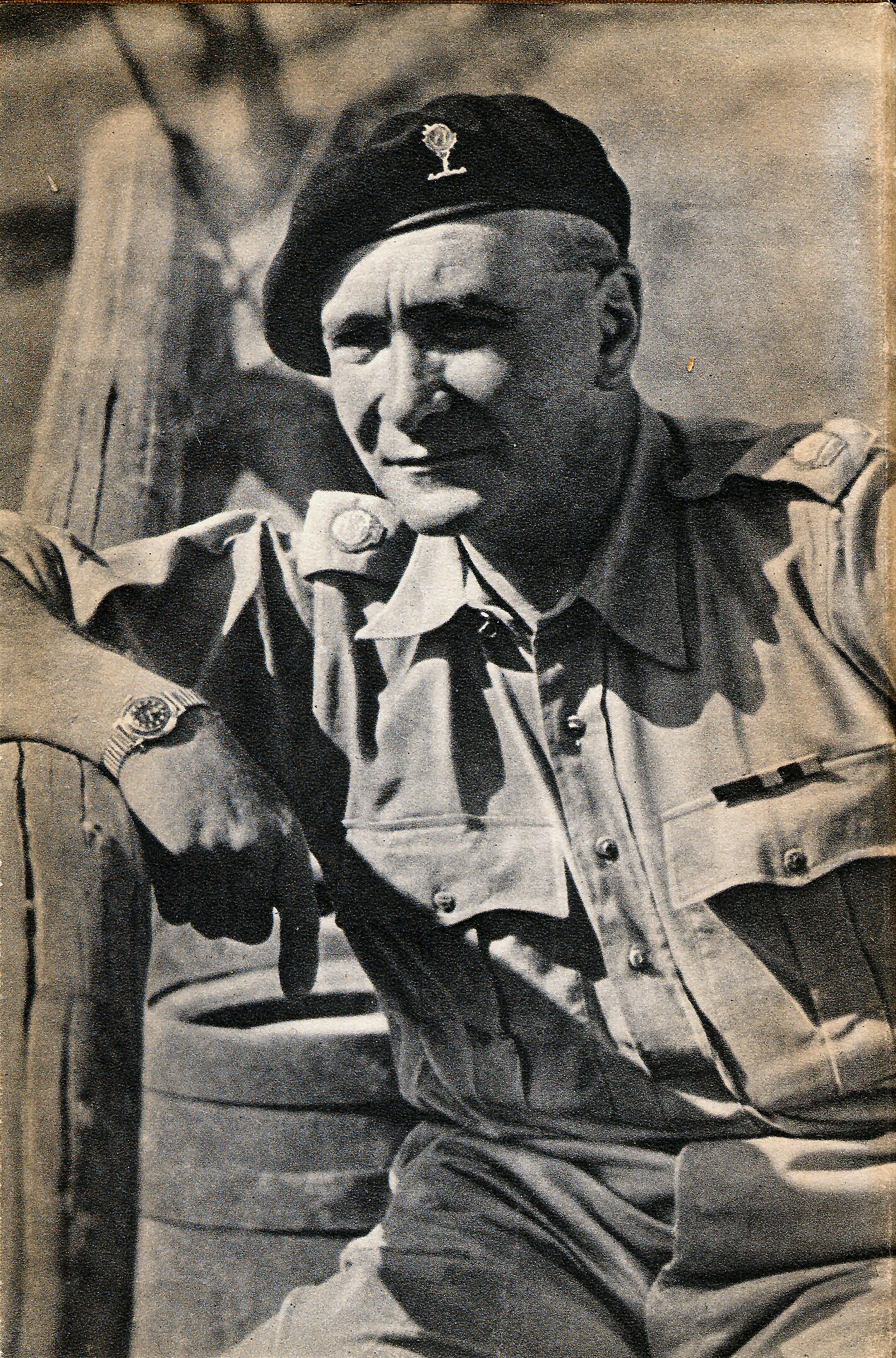
- Born: 30 March 1897; Huy, Liège, Belgium
- Died: 15 May 1951 (aged 54); Bloomsbury, London, England
- Burial place: Wixoe, Suffolk, England
- Military career
- Allegiance: France/United Kingdom
- Branch: French Army; British Army
- Service years: 1917–1918 (France); 1940–1946 (United Kingdom)
- Rank: Lieutenant-Colonel
- Nickname: Popski
- Service number: 159661
- Commands: Libyan Arab Force Commando; Popski's Private Army
- Conflicts: First World War; Western Front; Second World War; North African campaign; Italian campaign
- Awards: Distinguished Service Order; Military Cross; Croix de Guerre; Africa Star

Lieutenant-Colonel Vladimir "Popski" Peniakoff DSO MC FRGS (Russian: Владимир Дмитриевич Пеняков Vladimir Dmitriyevich Penyakov, 30 March 1897 – 15 May 1951) was the founder and commanding officer of No. 1 Demolition Squadron, PPA, colloquially known as "Popski's Private Army", during World War II.

== Early life ==
Vladimir Peniakoff was born on 30 March 1897 in Huy, Belgium, to affluent Jewish Russian emigre parents. His father, Dmitri, owned and operated an aluminium factory. Peniakoff began an engineering degree at the Free University of Brussels at the age of 15 before his studies were interrupted by the German invasion of Belgium in August 1914.

His father took him to England, where Peniakoff resumed his studies at St John's College, Cambridge, reading mathematics. He initially had conscientious objections to participation in World War I, but by his fourth term at Cambridge his views had altered, and he went to France to volunteer as a gunner in the French artillery. He was injured during his service with the French Army and was invalided out after the Armistice in November 1918.

In 1924 Peniakoff emigrated to Egypt, where he worked as an engineer with a sugar manufacturer. During this period of his life he learned to sail, fly and navigate vehicles through the desert, and also become a Fellow of the Royal Geographical Society. Peniakoff was a polyglot who spoke English, Russian, Italian, German, French and Arabic well.

== World War II ==
Peniakoff was commissioned as a second lieutenant on the British Army General List on 4 October 1940, serving in the Libyan Arab Force. He commanded the unit known as "Popski's Private Army" in the Middle East and Italy. He was eventually promoted to lieutenant colonel.

He was given the nickname Popski, after a Daily Mirror cartoon character, by Captain Bill Kennedy Shaw (the LRDG's Intelligence Officer) because his signallers had problems with the name Peniakoff.

During the conflict he was awarded the Military Cross on 26 November 1942, and on 26 April 1945 he was appointed a Companion of the Distinguished Service Order.

During WW2, Peniakoff sustained two injuries to his left hand: the first, during the desert campaign, resulted in the loss of a finger, while the second, towards the end of the war in Italy, necessitated amputation of the entire hand.

Post-war, in 1947, he was made a Belgian Officier de l'Ordre de la Couronne avec Palme and awarded the Belgian Croix de guerre avec Palme.

Peniakoff became the British-Russian liaison officer in Vienna before demobilisation, naturalisation and achieving fame as a British writer and broadcaster. In 1950 he wrote the book Private Army about his experiences; it sold very well, was reprinted several times that year, and has continued to be reprinted (also titled Popski's Private Army) well into the 21st century.

== Personal life ==
In Egypt he married Josephe Louise Colette "Josette" Ceysens, an Egypt-born Belgian, on 10 November 1928. They had two daughters, Olga and Anne, born in 1930 and 1932. After receiving his commission he divorced Josephe in March 1941 and sent the family to South Africa. On 2 April 1948 he married Pamela Firth in Chelsea.

== Death ==
Peniakoff died on 15 May 1951 of a brain tumour at the National Hospital for Neurology and Neurosurgery in London. His body was buried in the graveyard of St. Leonard's Church, Wixoe, Suffolk.

== Sources ==
- Peniakoff, Vladimir (1950). Private Army. Jonathan Cape.

--- Private Army. Jonathan Cape. 2nd Edition, foreword by General Sir John Hackett, minor revisions, 1951.
--- Popski's Private Army. Cassell Military Paperbacks, 2004. ISBN 0-304-36143-7.
Translated into Swedish (1951), German (1951), Italian (1951), French (1953), Hebrew (1954), Spanish (1955), Serbo-Croat (1957).
