= The Flibbertys =

American comic strip by Ray Helle

The Flibbertys was a daily comic strip created by Ray Helle on September 20, 1954. It revolved around the husband-and-wife team of Stan and Fran Flibberty, their teenage daughter Wendy, younger children Butch and Sis, plus Geddown the dog and Preston the cat. There also was a mouse who Preston tried to catch.

The three animals could talk among themselves, but humans couldn't understand them. In 1972, Helle used human characters less and focused on the animals. By August 20, he had brought the strip to a close.
