= Raymond Macherot =

Belgian cartoonist (1924–2008)

- Born: 30 March 1924 Verviers, Belgium
- Died: 26 September 2008 (aged 84)
- Areas: Artist, writer
- Pseudonym: Zara
- Notable works: Clifton; Chlorophylle; Sibylline

Raymond Macherot (30 March 1924 – 26 September 2008) was a Belgian comics artist, most famous for his satirical funny animal series Chlorophylle and Sibylline. Although not nearly as famous as fellow Belgian cartoonists such as Hergé, Peyo or André Franquin, Macherot's work, both as artist and writer, remains highly regarded among critics and collectors.

== Biography ==
=== The Tintin years ===
Raymond Macherot was born in Verviers, Belgium in 1924. He wanted to become a journalist or a painter but, for financial reasons, he became an illustrator and comics artist. Following the end of World War II, Macherot began his career producing a few cartoons in the style of Virgil Partch for the satirical weekly Pan, under the pseudonym "Zara". In 1953, he joined the Franco-Belgian comics magazine Tintin, where he wrote a scenario for Fred Funcken's Le chevalier blanc and made numerous illustrations and magazine covers.

In 1954, Macherot created the series Chlorophylle, featuring anthropomorphic animals. Macherot sets his first adventures in the countryside, where Chlorophylle, a dormouse, and his best friend Minimum, try to defeat animal villains often much bigger than themselves, typically led by the megalomaniac rat, Anthracite.

With Les croquillards (1957), Macherot placed his characters on the island of Croquefredouille, a fictitious country populated entirely with "civilized" animals, complete with technology, police, government, and so on. The action surrounds the introduction (by Anthracite, of course) of carnivorous animals to the island (the 'croquillards' of the title). The story is darkly comic, with many characters ending up as gourmet meals for the predators. Strangely, Macherot's publisher, Le Lombard, refused to release the Croquefredouille stories in book form until 1980.

Alternatively, in 1959, Macherot created Colonel Clifton, a series about a retired MI5 detective. He did three books worth of material, all the while continuing Chlorophylle, before calling it quits and moving to Spirou magazine, run by competitor-publisher Dupuis.

Le Lombard retained the rights to Macherot's abandoned series. Chlorophylle was taken up with mild success by successive teams of authors, notably Dupa & Greg, as well as Walli and Bob de Groot. As for Clifton, Turk & De Groot turned the series into a relative hit.

=== The Spirou years ===
Macherot began his stint at Spirou with a new series, Chaminou, featuring a cat secret agent to the King, living in the country Zoolande. However, Chaminou's first story, Chaminou et le Khrompire (1964), was unpopular and Macherot abandoned Chaminou. Closer to Chlorophylle, Sibylline, featured a female mouse and her fiancé Taboum. Many books have been published in this series, which enjoyed some success. From 1972 to 1976, Paul Deliège wrote the scenarios for Sibylline. Macherot ended the series upon his retirement in 1990.

Other series created by Macherot for Spirou include Pantoufle (with René Goscinny), Mirliton (with Raoul Cauvin), and as scenarist on Mulligan with Yvan Delporte and Isabelle, with Delporte and André Franquin. In the 1990s, Chaminou was revived, first by the team of Yann Lepennetier and Denis Bodart, and later by Olivier Saive, who completely redrew and augmented Chaminou et le Khrompire under Macherot's supervision, splitting it in two volumes. As for Sibylline, the series was revived in 2006 by André Taymans for new adventures, also under Macherot's supervision.

Raymond Macherot died on the night of 25 and 26 September 2008 in his sleep.

== Themes ==
Although superficially gentle and innocent looking, many of Macherot's strips are darker, and certainly more violent and ambiguous than they may seem. The main theme in his work is the struggle for survival. In Macherot's world, animals live in a society of their own, and species must learn to coexist together peacefully. Macherot's typical way to achieve this is to make vegetarianism mandatory for all. As a result, his villains are often natural predators who choose to ignore the law of the land. Additionally, Macherot's intrigues often veer into the political, particularly during the so-called "Croquefredouille cycle" as well as in Chaminou et le Khrompire, and the subject of war is alluded to in many of his stories.

== Bibliography ==
Not all of Macherot's stories have been published in book form. When they were, they were not necessarily published in chronological order. This is particularly true with Chlorophylle. This list shows the original magazine publication order. The years indicate the initial publication date for each book.

Also note that most of these books have recently been reissued in collected hardback editions, with extensive notes and biographical details.

=== Chlorophylle ===
1. Chlorophylle contre les rats noirs (Le Lombard, 1956)
2. Chlorophylle et les conspirateurs (Le Lombard, 1956)
3. Pas de salami pour Célimène! (Le Lombard, 1957)
4. Le Bosquet hanté (Le Lombard 1957)
5. Les Croquillards (Glénat, 1977). This begins the so-called "Croquefredouille cycle".
6. Zizanion le terrible (Glénat, 1977)
7. Le retour de Chlorophylle (Le Lombard, 1961). This is a break in the cycle.
8. La revanche d'Anthracite (Le Lombard, 1964). This ends the "Croquefredouille cycle".
9. Le furet gastronome (Le Lombard, 1970)
10. Chloro à la rescousse (Le Lombard, 1971)

=== Clifton ===
1. Les enquêtes du colonel Clifton (Le Lombard, 1959)
2. Clifton à New-York (Le Lombard, 1960)
3. Clifton et les espions (Le Lombard, 1963)

=== Chaminou ===
- Chaminou et le Khrompire (Dupuis, 1965)
- La peur du loup (Marsu, 1992), story by Macherot and Olivier Saive, art by Saive

In addition, Macherot is credited with the following Chaminou books but has not contributed to the story or art:

- L'affaire Carotassis (Marsu, 1991), story by Yann, art by Denis Bodart
- La main verte (Marsu, 1993), by Olivier Saive
- L'opuscule sans scrupule (Marsu, 1995), by Olivier Saive

=== Sibylline ===
1. Sibylline et la betterave (Dupuis, 1967)
2. Sibylline en danger (Dupuis, 1969)
3. Sibylline et les abeilles (Dupuis, 1971)
4. Sibylline et le petit cirque (Dupuis, 1974)
5. Sibylline s'envole (Dupuis, 1975), story by Paul Deliège
6. Sibylline et les cravates noires (Dupuis, 1977), story by Paul Deliège
7. Elixir le magnifique (Dupuis, 1979)
8. Burokratz le vampire (Dupuis, 1982)
9. Le chapeau magique (Dupuis, 1983)
10. Le violon de Zagabor (Dupuis, 1984)
11. Sibylline et le Kulgude (Dupuis, 1985)

Later Sibylline stories have not seen publication in book form, though they were published in Spirou magazine.

New Sibylline stories are currently being produced by André Taymans. Macherot receives credit on the cover though his actual involvement is unclear.

- Sibylline et la ligue des coupe-jarrets (Flouzemaker, 2006), by André Taymans

=== Mirliton ===
- Mirliton (Dupuis, 1980), story by Raoul Cauvin. This is #4 in the series Les meilleurs récits du Journal Spirou.

=== Isabelle ===
- Le tableau enchanté (Dupuis, 1972), story by Macherot and Yvan Delporte, art by Will
- Isabelle et le capitaine (Dupuis, 1983), story by Macherot and Yvan Delporte, art by Will
- Les maléfices de l'oncle Hermès (Dupuis, 1978), story by Macherot, Franquin and Yvan Delporte, art by Will
- L'astragale de Cassiopée (Dupuis, 1979), story by Macherot, Franquin and Yvan Delporte, art by Will

=== Compilations ===
- Spécial Clifton (Le Lombard, 1981). Collects the three Clifton stories by Macherot.
- Chlorophylle à Croquefredouille (Le Lombard, 1998). Collects the Chlorophylle stories from the "Croquefredouille cycle". This is #7 in the series Les classiques du rire.
- Clifton (Niffle, 2004). A pocket-sized, black-and-white compilation of the three Clifton stories by Macherot.

=== Books about Macherot ===
- Macherot: une monographie (Mosquito, 1998). Features an interview, various critical texts, and many previously unreleased drawings.
- À propos de Macherot (À propos, 2005)
