= Philippe Liégeois =

Belgian comic book artist

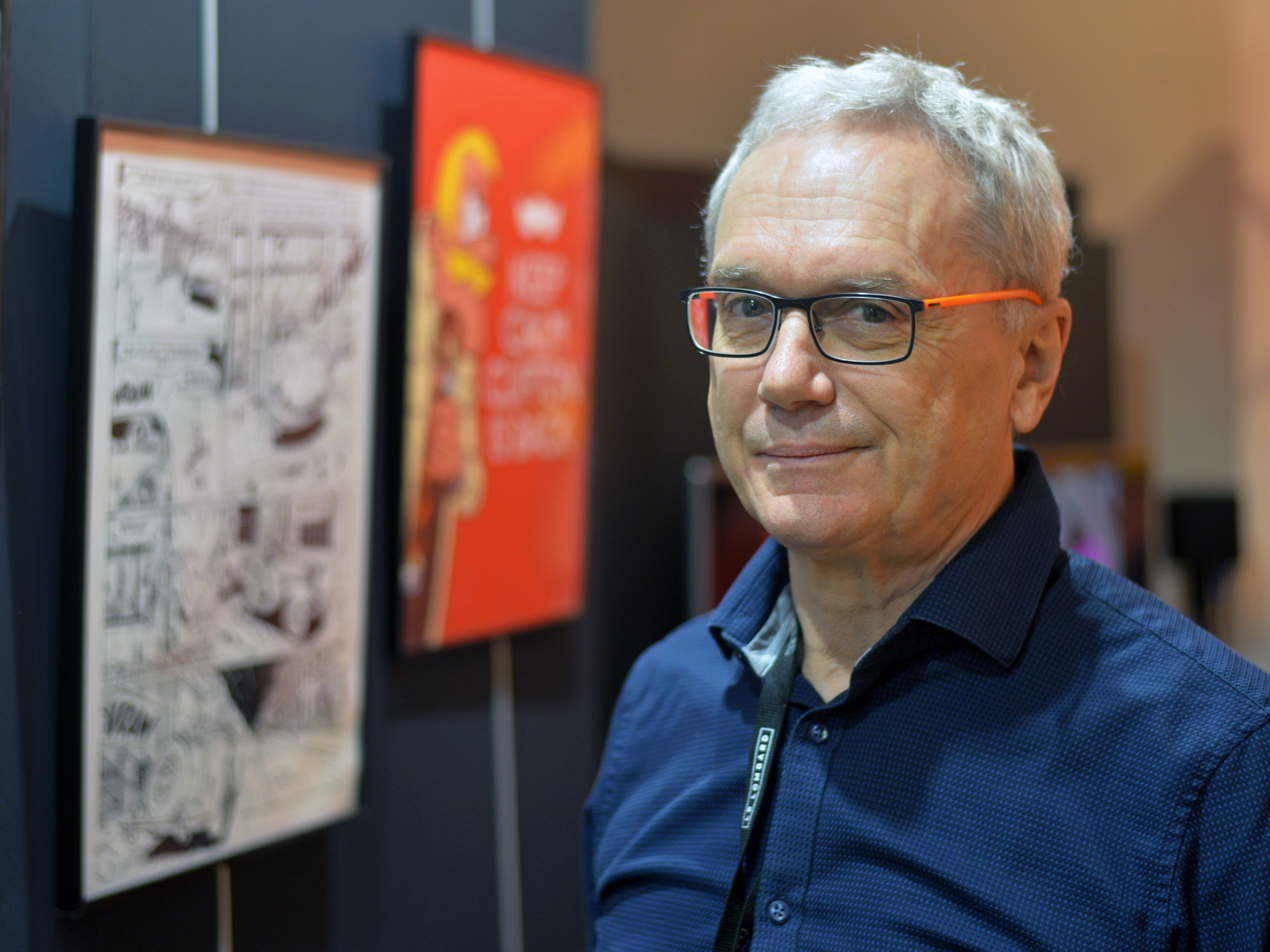
- Turk at Angoulême International Comics Festival
- Born: 8 July 1947 (age 79) Durbuy, Belgium
- Areas: Penciller, Inker
- Pseudonym: Turk
- Notable works: Colonel Clifton; Léonard; Robin Dubois

Philippe Liégeois (born 8 July 1947) is a Belgian comic book artist. He is best known by his pen name Turk. He is the co-author of numerous comic books, including Colonel Clifton, Léonard and Robin Dubois. His usual writer for all three series is Bob de Groot, and the duo "Turk & De Groot" has been very successful.

== Biography ==
Liégeois was born in the city of Durbuy, Belgium. The house is now converted to a hotel-restaurant, with a small plaquette at the door denoting the birthplace. Philippe is a French-speaking Belgian, living in the Ardennes near Namur, Belgium.

== Bibliography ==
Comics work includes:

- Colonel Clifton (1970–1983)
- Léonard (1976–present)
- Robin Dubois
