= Ray Helle =

American cartoonist

Ray Helle (1917-1999) was an artist who was born in New York City and trained as a cartoonist at the Pratt Institute. He crafted freelance gag cartoons until 1941.

He was then drafted into the United States Army and saw action in Europe during World War II. Some of his service was with a ski battalion in Norway. After the war, he was primarily a gag cartoonist until 1954, after which he focused on his daily comic strips The Flibbertys and Box Seat. He went into semi-retirement in 1989.

Helle died in 1999.
