= Chlorophylle =

Comic book series

- The main character with the series logo

Publication information
- Publisher: Lombard Editions; Tintin magazine
- Genre: Fantasy comics, funny animals
- Publication date: 1954–1987; 2014–present

Creative team
- Created by: Raymond Macherot
- Written by: Raymond Macherot
- Artist: Raymond Macherot

Chlorophylle is a Belgian comics series and Raymond Macherot's best known work, alongside Sibylline. It is a fantasy comic about anthropomorphic forest animals, including the title character Chlorophylle, who is a dormouse.

== Description ==
Chlorophylle is set in a European forest, more specifically in the animal kingdom of Coquefredouille. It's a world in itself and a mini anthropomorphic version of human society. All albums center around Chlorophylle, a dormouse who often has to solve problems and opponents who are much bigger than himself.

The stories were originally set in a realistic natural environment, but after 1963 Macherot changed it to a more humanized animal world. Despite their cartoon animal appearance the stories were notable for their satirical edge.

== Characters ==
- Chlorophylle: A red dormouse with a black circle around his eye. He is smart, generous and brave.
- Minimum: A mouse and Chlorophylle's best friend. He is smaller and more obese than Chlorophylle. Due to his stupidity and more impulsive behaviour he serves as Chlorophylle's sidekick and comic relief. He debuted in the second album, "Chlorphylle et les Conspirateurs".
- Serpolet: A white rabbit and good friend of Chlorophylle. He debuted in "Chlorophylle contre les rats noirs".
- Bitume: An owl who is one of Chlorophylle's friends. He debuted in "Chlorophylle contre les rats noirs".
- Torpille: An otter, also a friend of Chlorophylle.
- Mitron XIII: A mouse who is the king of Coquefredouille.
- Anthracite: A huge black rat who is Chlorophylle's arch archenemy. He is the leader of an army of black rats who hungers for power and luxury. In many stories he tries to kill off Chlorophylle once and for all. Anthracite was such a colorful character that Macherot explicitly secured the rights to the character when he left his publisher Lombard. In Macherot's other comics series, Sibylline, the rat character Anathème Percemiche is Anthracite's brother.
- Célimène: The cat of a notary. He debuts in "Pas de Salami pour Célimène" (1957), where he threatens Chlorphylle and his friends to bring him some meat, in exchange for their lives.
- Zizanion aka The duke Bihoreau de Bellerente: A heron who conspires to take over Mitron's XIII's throne.

== History ==
Macherot created the series in 1954 and continued drawing it until 1966. After that date other artists such as Hubuc, Dupa, Greg, Bob de Groot, Walli. and Bom took the series over until it was terminated in 1987. In 2014 "Chlorophylle" was relaunched by Zidrou and Godi.

"Chlorophylle" was published by Lombard and appeared in prepublication in the Belgian comics magazine Tintin until the 18th album, when Macherot left to join Spirou. The complete stories were republished by Lombard in 2012.

== Animated series ==
The Belgian animation studio Belvision animated a few stories by Chlorophylle for television in 1954. Four stories were adapted, three in black-and-white ("Chlorophylle contre les rats noirs", "Chlorophylle et les conspirateurs" and "Les Croquillards sortent en noir et blanc") and one in color ("Le Bosquet hanté").

In 1992 the comics were adapted for TV again as "The Adventures of Grady Greenspace", a French-Canadian puppet series consisting of 52 episodes, each 13 minutes long.

== In popular culture ==
In the Belgian Comic Strip Center in Brussels the permanent exhibition brings homage to the pioneers of Belgian comics, among them Raymond Macherot. In the room dedicated to his work everything is designed to look like Chlorophylle and Sibylline's underground home in the forest.

Chlorophylle is among the many Belgian comics characters to jokingly have a Brussels street named after them. Since 2007 the Rue du Midi/Zuidstraat (not far from the Brussels-South railway station) has a commemorative plaque with the name Rue Chlorophylle placed under the actual street sign.

== See also ==
• Marcinelle school

• Belgian comics

• Franco-Belgian comics
