= Sibylline =

Belgian comic series

- The main character with the series logo

Publication information
- Publisher: Dupuis; Spirou magazine
- Genre: Fantasy comics, funny animals
- Publication date: March 14, 1965

Creative team
- Created by: Raymond Macherot
- Written by: Raymond Macherot
- Artist: Raymond Macherot
- Colorist(s): Bruno Wesel, Studio Léonardo

Sibylline is a Belgian comics series by Raymond Macherot and his second best-known work after Chlorophylle. Just like the latter, it is a fantasy comic about anthropomorphic animals in a forest setting. However, here the protagonist is a female mouse named Sibylline.

== Concept ==
Sibylline is a female mouse who lives in the forest Bosquet Jojeux, which is an anthropomorphic version of real city life. Much like Chlorophylle the stories appear to be a cartoon animal fantasy strip, but in fact have a darker, satirical edge. As the series progressed more fantastical elements started to occur, such as ghosts, wizards and vampires.

== Characters ==
- Sibylline: The star of the series. She is a gentle, clever and brave female mouse, but can be jealous and hot-headed. Originally she lived in a house, but later she moved to the forest. She wears a yellow bonnet and a blue dress.
- Taboum: Her dim-witted husband, who is very clumsy and a male version of the damsel in distress. Just like her, he is a mouse.
- Flouzemaker: A crow who is a cigar-smoking business man.
- Brigadier Verboten: A strict and authoritarian hedgehog who guards the forest. He wears a paper hat and a sheriff's badge. His last name is a pun on the German word for "Forbidden".
- Anathème Percemiche: The major antagonist of the series. He is a rat who is related to Anthracite, the antagonist from Macherot's other series, Chlorophylle. Anathème debuted in"Sibylline et l'imposteur".
- The small circus: A circus company who frequently travels to Sibylline's home place. It is composed of Gloglo, a parakeet who is a ventriloquist; Alphonse a dog who pulls their mobile home forth, Gustave a white cat who is an equilibrist and Gougoui the mouse, who tames butterflies.
- Patakes: A duck who works as a reporter for "La Trompette Fureteuse".
- Pantoufle: A cat who tries to eat Sibylline and her friends, but always fails. He was later given his own comics spin-off, under the script of René Goscinny.
- Burokratz: A vampire who enjoys stealing cakes.
- Zabagor: A white bird who can play the violin. He does this so well that it scares Burokratz the vampire.
- Pistolard: A fox who is a magician.
- Croque-Monsieur: A ferret, who is another major antagonist. He is the evilest of all villains and actually murders animals to eat them. His name is a pun on the snack Croque-monsieur.

== History ==
In 1964 Raymond Macherot left Tintin, where he had drawn Chlorophylle for many years. Contractually he was unable to take his characters with him, except for the antagonist Anthracite, whom he kept. In 1965 he created the series Sybilline for the rival magazine Spirou. The tone and atmosphere were very similar to Chlorophylle. Scripts were written by Macherot and Paul Deliège. After Macherot quit drawing Taymans took over. The series ran in Spirou until 1990. In 2006 the series was relaunched by André Taymans and François Corteggiani.

== In popular culture ==
In the Belgian Comic Strip Center in Brussels the permanent exhibition brings homage to the pioneers of Belgian comics, among them Raymond Macherot. In the room dedicated to his work, everything is designed to look like a Chlorophylle and Sibylline's underground home in the forest.

Sibylline is among the many Belgian comics characters to jokingly have a Brussels street named after them. Since 2007 the Place Saint-Jean/ Sint-Jansplein has a commemorative plaque with the name Place Sibylline placed under the actual street sign.

== See also ==
• Marcinelle school

• Belgian comics

• Franco-Belgian comics
