= Bobby Bear =

British comics character

Bobby Bear was a British comics character in the Daily Herald newspaper starting in 1919. He was a young male bear character based on the Steiff teddy bear that was popular at the time. His friends were Ruby Rabbit and Maisie Mouse. Later Percy Porker the pig became a regular character as well as Freddy Fox on occasion. He was the first bear to appear as a cartoon character, pre-dating Rupert Bear by a year.

== The Annuals ==
There were annuals issued from the early 1920s, in small format thin paperback volumes which collected their adventures. These are known to exist as year-dated annuals 1923 to 1926, and 1928-31. The 1923 annual states inside that it is their 'third book', so two more exist from 1920-1922. The cover price was fixed at 'One Shilling' on the 1923-1931 annuals.

The 1923-30 Annuals were by Kitsie Bridges (Aunt Kitsie) and pictures by Dora McLaren. The 1931 annual drawings were by 'Meg'. The 1932 annual had some 'Meg' drawings and some by Wilfred Haughton, and was the last one edited by Aunt Kitsie. For the 1933 to 1939 annuals, they were all drawn and written by Wilfred Haughton who also created the early Mickey Mouse annuals, also for Deans, from 1930 to 1939. He rarely signed his work, though his style is very distinctive. By 1939 Wilfred Haughton had fallen out with Deans as he would not draw Mickey Mouse for the Mickey Mouse comics in a more modern style. He appears to have left Deans entirely by then as Bobby Bear is created by a different unnamed artist starting with the 1940 annual. The only annual featuring his drawings with his signature is the 1936 one.

The annuals from 1932 became very elaborate by the mid-1930s with multiple colour plates and many pages to cut out, which makes the later 1930s ones hard to find complete. The most unusual Wilfred Haughton story appeared in the 1936 Annual, entitled 'Mr Nobody' which was about a bear who had no body. Several surreal pictures of the head being carried about and then the headless body running around and eventually the two were matched up.

The 1931 Annual shows '1931' on the cover, but is misprinted '1930' on the first page. The 1932-34 ones are dated on the front cover. 1935 with 'Lucky Dip 6d'; 1936 with 'Never Lets You Down'; 1937 with 'Lets All Be Merry' are only dated on the title page. 1938 with 'Out For Fun Again' and 1939 with 'Rattling Good!' on the cover are undated. The 1939 Annual is usually found missing a lot of the pages: page 48 had a Donkey & Sergeant cutout; pages 73–80 had a 'Punch & Judy' cut-out & play and page 98 a Racing Car cutout. Later books can be dated via the ComicsUK website 'Annual Gallery' linked below.

== Bobby Bear Club ==
The 'Bobby Bear Club' started in the early 1930s, similar to Pip, Squeak and Wilfred and Teddy Tail clubs, and the 1932 annual states that over 400,000 members had joined. You received a 'Secret Rules' booklet revealing the secret sign to make to fellow 'Bear Cubs' which involved putting your first finger and thumb together to make an 'O' and putting both hands to make 'OO' like eyes. There was a salute and a 'Call and Rally' tune as well as a Club Recruiting Song. You could also get Free Insurance against personal accidents if aged between 6 and 16, and the motto was 'Make Friends'. You also received a numbered admittance card and a yearly Birthday Card.

Starting with the 1940 annual, different artists drew the characters resulting in variations in style through the decades, with Bobby Bear being aimed at very young children by the 1960s. The 'Golden Years' of this character are the 1932-1939 annuals, with the pre-1932 annuals having solely Bobby Bear content.
