= Diddl =

German fictional character and comic strip

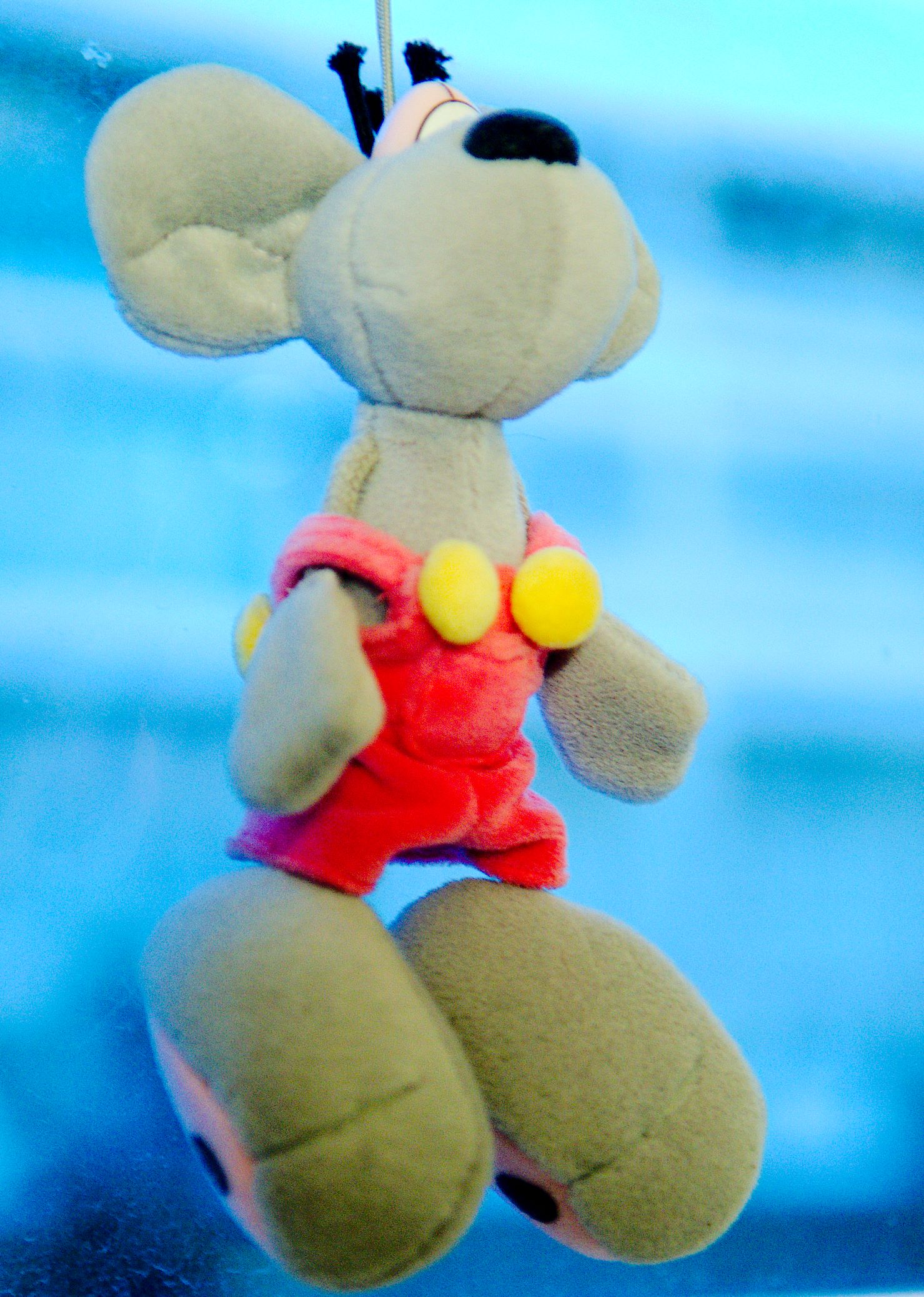
A Diddl plushy

Diddl is a German comic strip created by German artist Thomas Goletz in 1990. The first sketch of Diddl was made on 24 August 1990. Diddl is a white Jumping Mouse, with big ears and large pink-soled feet allowing him to jump large distances. Diddl and his friends are featured on various sorts of products such as stationery and collectibles, and also in a range of plush dolls and toys manufactured by Depesche.

In Austria, Diddl was a highly popular cartoon, together with its host of characters.

== History ==
On August 24, 1990 Goletz made the first sketch of "Diddl", as a kangaroo. In later sketches the character became a jumping mouse with big ears and huge feet. The Diddl mouse is not a comic character in the strict sense, as it did not have its first appearances in comics, books or cartoons, but a product that was invented exclusively for the sale of commodities. It was first seen in January 1991 on a 48-part postcard series. The cards eventually became coveted collectibles, so in 1992 Depesche responded to the boom and brought out the first stuffed animal of Diddl. The first Diddl block pages were produced in 1994 and caused a collection and exchange fever in both adults and children. Later, other products such as satchels, calendars, T-shirts, bed linen, stationery, cups and glasses followed.

The Depesche Vertriebsgesellschaft, which was founded in 1985 with three employees, moved from Hamburg to Geesthacht. In 2014, it employed around 350 employees, including 220 in Geesthacht, and had a turnover in the three-digit millions. In addition, a monthly journal (Diddls Käseblatt) with a circulation of 340,000 copies in three languages (German, French and Dutch) is published, which was available from 2004 to 2009 only by subscription at Depesche or through the dealers of Diddl products and was available to buy at newsagents from 2009 onwards. As of today, Diddl's Käseblatt can only be obtained via subscription at Blue Ocean with 6 issues being released a year.

The names of other characters invented by Thomas Goletz over the years, such as the mouse Diddlina, who is Diddl's girlfriend, Teddy Pimboli, the fox-rabbit Mimihopps, the sheep Wollywell and Vanillivi, the raven Ackaturbo, the horse Galupy, Merksmir, Bibombl, Professor Diddldaddl Bubblebang, Milimits, Tiplitaps, the Frog-Brothers, Simsaly, Dimmdann, Lalunaly and Lolli Lovebear are mainly aimed at a young target group.

The Depesche Vertriebsgesellschaft announced that it had finished the production of Diddl products at the end of 2014. The rights then went back to the author, Thomas Goletz. The sales and marketing company Kiddinx Media has since acted as a licensing agency. The magazine Diddls Käseblatt, which is published by the publisher Blue Ocean Entertainment, was not affected by the change of copyright.

In 2016 Thomas Goletz and Kiddinx decided to reissue Diddl products under the brand of Diddl Forever with United Labels AG as the manufacturer and marketer. The Elfen Service GmbH, a subsidiary of United Labels AG, operates the official online store of Diddl products since November 2016. On the occasion of the comeback, an Instagram account was created in 2017 and Diddl is also available on Facebook.

== List of characters ==
The series' characters reside in the fictional 'Cheesecakeland', where the soil, rocks and walls are made of cheese but otherwise seems very similar to Earth with deserts, rivers, and even a moon.

- Diddl: Main character of the series.
- Diddlina: Diddl's girlfriend, who is also a jumping mouse.
- Mimihops: A cheerful fox-rabbit who is best friends with Pimboli.
- Pimboli: A cuddly teddy bear and friends with Mimihopps and Ackaturbo. He lives in a suitcase at Diddl's Cheese Cave.
- Ackaturbo: A clumsy raven and friend of Professor Bubblebang.
- Professor Diddldaddl Bubblebang: A scatter-brained professor that owns a laboratory where he conducts experiments.
- Merksmir Lettermampf: A clever bookworm who lives in Professor Bubblebang's library. He remembers the contents of any book that he eats.
- Bibombl: Diddlina's pet setter dog who has an affinity for cheese-bones.
- Milimits: Diddlina's pet tigertail kitten who is mischievous and playful.
- Tiplitaps: A turtle who lives on the beach and enjoys playing beach volleyball.
- Wollywell & Vanillivi: A black angora goat and a white lucky sheep who wander Cheesecakeland together.
- Galupy: An adventurous horse, who is friends with Diddl and Diddlina.
- The Frog Brothers: Three mischievous and gross frogs, who are the antagonists in the series.
- Lolli Lovebear: A teddy bear who has read about Diddlina and the Cheesecakeland and posted himself there via parcel.
- Simsaly: A magic-blossom-fairy and close friend of Diddlina who lives in the fairy kingdom of Florany.
- Dimmdann: A hardworking glowing bee who helps Simsaly search for magic blossoms using his light.
- Lalunaly: The only pink Unicorn in Florany, who is close friends with Simsaly and Diddlina.

== List of locations ==
- Cheesecakeland: The main location where Diddl and his friends live, where the soil, rocks and walls are made of cheese, gummy-bears and potato-chips grow on trees and bushes, but otherwise seems very similar to Earth with deserts, rivers, and even a moon.
- Moonlight Twinkle Lake: A beautiful, glistening lake in the middle of the land.
- Chocolate Rock: A tall assortment of rocks near Moonlight Twinkle Lake nicknamed "Chocolate Rock" due to its brown peak. Chocolate Rock separates the homes of Diddl and Diddlina.
- Diddl's Cheese Cave: Diddl's home, located under an attic tree nearby Moonlight Twinkle Lake.
- Diddlina's Cheese Cave: Diddlina's home, located under a flower-meadow nearby Moonlight Twinkle Lake.
- Professor Bubblebang's Laboratory: Professor Bubblebang's home and laboratory, sandwiches between two large granite rocks by Moonlight Twinkle Lake.
- Littldiddlmousen: Located east from the Moonlight Twinkle Lake through the Cotton-Candy-Wool-Ball-Forest.
- Toad Swamp: Home of the Frog Bros.
- Florany: A world located inside a flower-pot in Diddlina's cheese cave. It inhabits characters like Simsaly, Dimmdann, and Lalunaly.

== List of plants ==
- Sensiblia Extremis: When touched, the blossoms pull back into their protective shells. Because of that this flower is at risk of extinction because insects can't land on it for pollination.
- Umbrella Bush: When its blossoms are open it may rain.
- Cube Tree: Its fruits are useful as a building material or as seat cushions.
- Toothbrush Bush: Grows mostly in the vicinity of dental stone.
- Heart Bush: A bush with large, rose-red petals in the shape of a heart.
- Lamp Flower: The blossoms light up at night in different colours. They look great at fairgrounds and are used to decorate patios.
- Fan Plant: In the summer, this balcony and indoor plant blooms and creates a pleasant breeze.
- Small Bell Flower: When touched, these flowers make a delicate ringing sound.
- Dissonanzia: When irritated, this noisy plant make very strange sounds just before withering.
- Magic Blossoms: Magic-Blossoms only bloom with the aid of a magic-blossom-fairy. They only grow in the world of Florany.

== List of Diddl's relatives / minor characters ==
- Tigopardy-Diddl: The earliest pre-ancestor to Diddl from the stone cheese period. He's a hybrid of a leopard and a tiger mouse.
- Count Diddcula: A jumping mouse vampire who lives in Castle Bibberstein.
- Hampfdiddl Bogart: A detective from Littldiddlmousen.
- Middly McMousy: Diddl's second cousin from Scotland, who is friends with the Loch Ness monster.
- Diddman Raggy: A 4/8 brother of Professor Bubblebang, who lives in Jamaica with his wife and has an affinity for rapping.
- Maria Huana: Diddman's wife, who also lives in Jamaica.
- Diddldeuse de Surprise: Diddl's distant cousin from France, who is a famous chef with a secret crush on Diddlina.
- Grandpa Dadderich: Diddl's grandfather, who lives on his houseboat. He is over 100 years old and enjoys to tell stories about his past.
- Aunt Diddrudiella: Diddl's wealthy aunt, who lives with her children Didofein, Diddrudlinchen and Diddloritzefritz in an old castle in Littldiddlmousen.
- Didofein: Diddl's second cousin, who is obsessed with his beauty.
- Diddloritzefritz: Diddl's second cousin, who loves to be colorful and loud.
- Diddrudlinchen: Diddl's second cousin, who is obsessed with waiting for her future husband in her wedding dress.
- Diddleus Mousezart: Diddl's pre-pre-pre-pre-ancestor, famous for his "Little Night Music" composition.
- Diddldong Ping Wu: Diddl's Chinese seven-corners-related cousin, who has a black-belt in "Mikado" and is on the Chinese jumping mouse team.
- Diddluigi di Antipastipeperazzi: Diddl's Italian great-uncle. He runs a pizzeria called "Da Diddluigi".
- Diddlora Jumpi: Diddl's sister-in-law from Switzerland. She has a great affinity for cheese-fondue and cheese dumplings.
- Frudiddlosito: A brown jumping mouse, who lives with his family in the jungle of South-America.
- Diddjeridoo: A kangaroo from Australia, who loves to jump.
- Don Diddlovitsch: A firebreather and brother of Diddl's brother-in-law.
- Dr. Diddlandi: An Indian fakir, who lives in Cheesekutta.
- Diddrodriguez: A monozygotic jumping mouse, who eats only hot chili-peppers and plays music with Diddgonzales.
- Diddgonzales: A monozygotic jumping mouse, who eats only hot chili-peppers and plays music with Diddrodriguez.
- Vladiddlmir Minusdegree: Diddl's great-uncle from Siberia, who dances the minus-degree-polka to stay alive.
- Dittzl: An alien jumping mouse, and descendant of Diddl's ancestors from Mars.
