= Teddy Tail =

British newspaper comic strip

Teddy Tail was a British newspaper comic strip about a cartoon mouse featured in The Daily Mail from 5 April 1915. It was the first daily cartoon strip in a British newspaper (being also the first to use speech balloon rather than captions), The character survived until the 1960s with several artists drawing newspaper strips and the varied annuals. Such was his popularity that other newspapers created their own cartoon characters, the Daily Express with Rupert Bear and the Daily Mirror with Pip, Squeak and Wilfred.

== The Folkard era ==
The first variant of Teddy Tail was drawn by Charles Folkard (1878–1963) who wrote and illustrated Teddy Tail from 1915 until 1926. Teddy Tail is always seen with a knot in his tail. Only from reading his first 1915 published Annual The Adventures of Teddy Tail of The Daily Mail do you see his tail is knotted purposely to help his friend Dr. Beetle (a quack) escape from a hole he had fallen into. As quoted from the first book:

"Then a dreadful thing happened. We couldn't get the knot undone. I don't think much of Dr. Beetle as a Doctor. He oiled and patted it, but it was no good. My beauty has gone for ever."

Teddy Tail continued with several stories based on Children's Nursery Rhymes and historical events as well as fairy tales that were popular at the time. There were several annuals or books printed in the years before his 1933 revival, which were reprinted from the Daily Mail cartoon strips. The story that followed between the first published book and the second was never republished, only the 84 remaining newspaper cartoon strip clippings show the story between running from the Cat at the end of the first book and meeting the Noah's at the start of the 'In Nursery Rhyme Land' book.

The Looking Glass Annual also published a Teddy Tail story. This featured the Folkard drawings and story text adapted from the newspaper strips. This is the only appearance of Teddy Tail in another annual. This was a lesser-known children's annual from c1924-26 that featured a glass mirror inset into the front cover and was published by Middleton Publications, London. The Teddy Tail story appears in the last one from c. 1926 in the 'boy with a monocle' cover edition. Folkard left the paper soon after, and the strip concluded its first incarnation.

== The Foxwell era ==
In April 1933 Teddy Tail was revived by the Daily Mail, with new drawings by Herbert Sydney Foxwell (1890–1943) who was already known as a cartoon illustrator having drawn Tiger Tim since the mid-1920s for the Amalgamated Press, later known as Fleetway. Tiger Tim had been part of the Bruin Boys since the early 1900s and featured in the Playbox annual since 1910 as well as his own annual since 1922. This second incarnation of Teddy Tail drew him as a schoolboy aged character and was aimed more at younger readers. He was part of a family group that lived in the village of Whiskertown including the 'Whisker Pets' which were looked after by Mrs Whisker, an adult mouse. Piggy the pig, Kitty Puss the cat and Dougie the duck.

But, even before April 1933, The Foxwell era had started abroad in Finland 15. November 1931 in the Turku town newspaper Uusi Aura. Foxwell characters were adventuring there with a daily picture until fifth of January 1933 with 7 different adventures, all these possibly never published in England. Anyway after a thorough rehearsal in the Finnish newspaper, Foxwell was ready to continue characters adventures in England. It is not known why the 7 stories were published abroad before the Foxwell era started in Daily Mail.

Teddy Tail annuals were issued from 1933 to 1940. Merchandising, following similar successes with Mickey Mouse were popular, such items as small toys, cut-outs, jigsaws and Teddy Tail biscuits were made.

The 'Teddy Tail League' was started also in 1933, which involved members receiving enamel badges, birthday cards and free advice on Pets or Hobbies, similar to the Pip, Squeak and Wilfred and Bobby Bear clubs. Special events and public activities were announced in the Daily Mail. In the 1936 Annual, mention is made of "750,000 members". You had to collect six 'seals' from the Daily Mail newspaper to enrol and get the badge and Membership rules card and learn of Teddy Tail's 'secret sign'. You could add 12 more 'seals' to get the Sports Badge according to the 1934 annual.

Foxwell died whilst on service in 1943, bringing an end to the series until 1949.

== Later revivals ==
In 1949, Teddy Tail was revived with illustrators Arthur ‘Spot’ Potts, Tony Hawes (1929–1997) and William St. John Glenn (1904–1974) drawing him. This time he was very anthropomorphised being now a skinny human type character in the vein of Bugs Bunny and the redesigned Mickey Mouse, but still generally similar to the Foxwell creation. The annuals were issued from 1949 to c.1962.

== Annuals ==
There were several undated annuals featuring the first version of Teddy Tail. These follow an order as proved by the story continuity and those as shown in adverts in the back of the later prints of the books. They are as shown below in the order of issuing.
