= Pip, Squeak and Wilfred =

British strip cartoon published in the Daily Mirror from 1919 to 1956

- From left to right. Squeak, Wilfred, Pip.
- Authors: Bertram Lamb; Austin Bowen Payne
- Current status/schedule: Concluded
- Launch date: 1919
- End date: 1956
- Publisher(s): Daily Mirror, Sunday Pictorial
- Genre(s): Humour, children's

Pip, Squeak and Wilfred was a British strip cartoon published in the Daily Mirror from 1919 to 1956 (with a break c. 1940–1950), as well as the Sunday Pictorial in the early years. It was conceived by Bertram Lamb, who took the role of Uncle Dick, signing himself (B.J.L.) in an early book, and was drawn until c. 1939 by Austin Bowen Payne, who always signed as A. B. Payne. It concerned the adventures of an orphaned family of animals. Pip, who assumed the father role, was a dog, whilst the 'mother', Squeak, was a penguin. Wilfred was the 'young son' and was a rabbit with very long ears.

== Character beginnings ==
The characters Pip, Squeak and Wilfred were created by Bertram Lamb, a journalist on the Daily Mirror, who was born in Islington, London, on 14 May 1887 and died in Switzerland in 1938. He never drew the cartoons but thought up the idea of the characters.

The origins of the characters are mentioned in the cartoon strips. Squeak was found in the London Zoological Gardens after hatching on the South African coast years before. Pip was discovered begging by a policeman on the Thames Embankment and was sent to a dogs' home, where he was bought for half-a-crown. Wilfred was found in a field near his burrow and was adopted by Pip and Squeak, who were in turn looked after by Uncle Dick and Angeline, the housemaid of their family house on the edge of London.

== The WLOG fanclub ==
In 1927 the Pip, Squeak and Wilfred club began. It was named the Wilfredian League of Gugnuncs (WLOG) and organised many competitions and events for thousands of members, especially at British south-coast seaside resorts. 'Gugnuncs' is a combination of two baby-talk words used by Wilfred, who as a toddler-aged rabbit cannot speak properly, nunc being his version of uncle. There was a WLOG member's badge in blue enamelled metal featuring the long ears of Wilfred. Among the WLOG rules was one to never eat rabbit.

== Cartoon films ==
A series of silent animated cartoons was produced in 1921 by Lancelot Speed titled 'The Wonderful Adventures of Pip, Squeak & Wilfred'. Twenty–five 5-minute shorts were made (being paired with the Mirror-Pictorial Newsreel) and were first–shown between 17 February 1921 and 11 August 1921. Titles included 'Pip And Wilfred Detectives', 'Over The Edge Of The World', 'The Six-Armed Image', 'The Castaways', 'Ups And Downs', 'Popski's Early Life', 'Wilfred's Nightmare', 'Wilfred's Wonderful Adventures' and 'Trouble In The Nursery'. None appears to be currently available in any format.

== Annuals ==
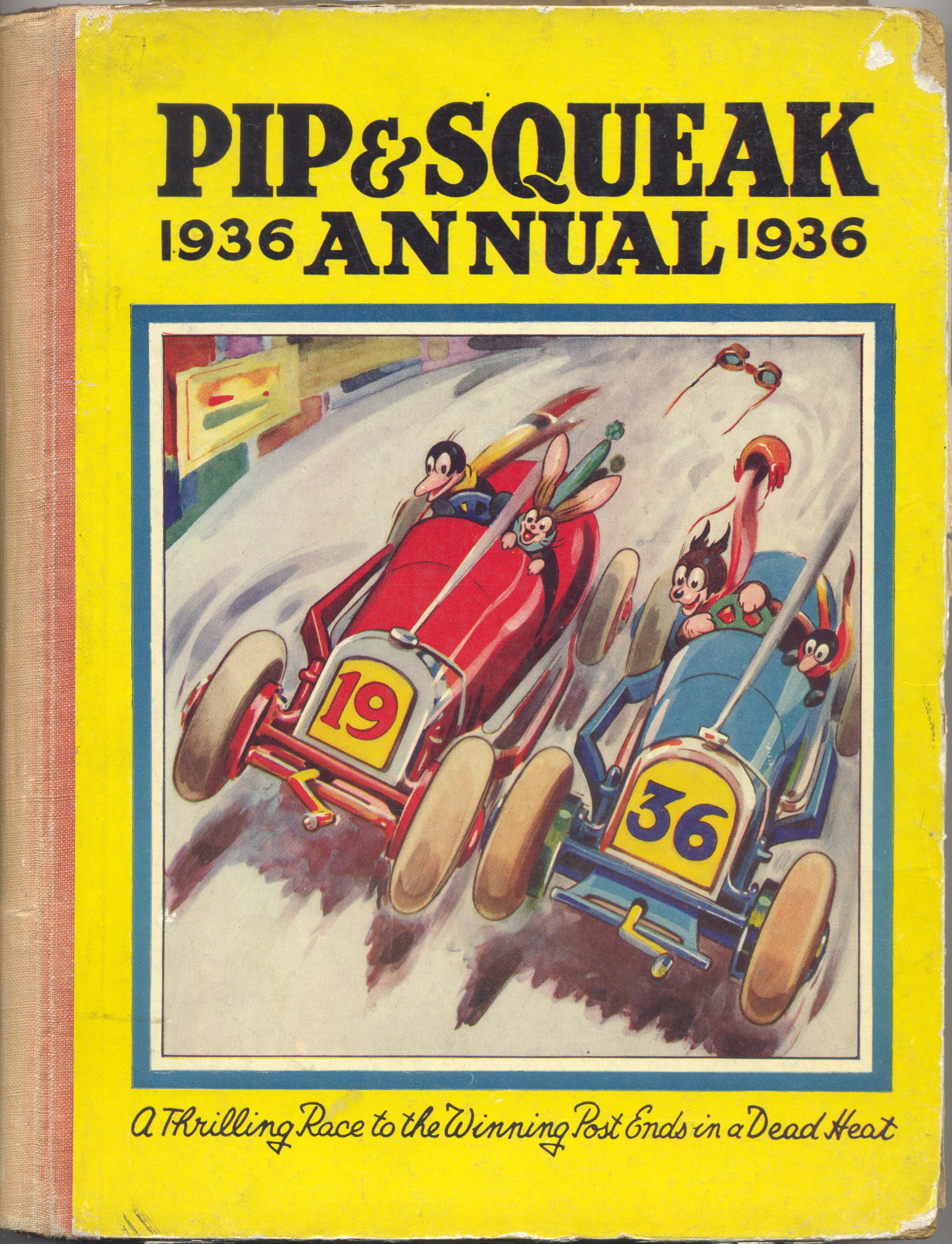
Pip & Squeak Annual 1936

An early book was Pip, Squeak & Wilfred, Their "Luvly" Adventures, issued in 1921 by Stanley Paul & Co., London. This book recapped on the earliest Daily Mirror strips, showing how they were introduced. Luvly was one of Squeak's favourite words.

Pip and Squeak Annuals appeared each year from 1922, dated as the 1923 to 1939 annuals. A separate Wilfred's Annual also appeared, dated 1924 to 1938, featuring stories aimed at under-10 year olds. The 1934 Pip & Squeak Annual featured a 'magic red frame', which allowed the reader to see hidden pictures on several pages. The 1934 Wilfred's Annual similarly featured a pantomime cut-out insert. The final Pip & Squeak annual of 1939 incorporated Wilfred's Annual, which had ended the previous year, and is the rarest of the series owing to low sales and poor-quality paper being used. No annual was issued in 1940.

The annuals continued the 1920s type of fairyland surrealism in their pages until the last annual, by which time other more popular annuals such as Bobby Bear and Teddy Tail were more contemporary, leaving this series appearing rather dated in comparison, meaning later years of Pip and Squeak annual and especially Wilfred's annual sold in smaller quantities. Three Uncle Dick's Annuals were issued from 1929 to 1931, dated as the 1930 to 1932 annuals, the first one's full name being 'Uncle Dick's Competition Annual'. These annuals were aimed more at boys, with action stories and very little Pip & Squeak content. As their title suggests, the books were in an elaborate competition format where you had to solve quizzes, paint in pictures and similar to win prizes.

A short-lived revived Pip, Squeak & Wilfred annual was issued in the mid-1950s, since the characters had been revived in the Daily Mirror a few years previously. This featured the characters updated and now drawn by a new, uncredited, artist. A newly bow-tied Wilfred and a younger Auntie, both previously only saying the odd nonsensical word, were now made to speak fully, losing the innocence and surreal charm of the pre-war years to fit the 1950s better. Stanley, a young penguin, became a regular character, having been introduced in the later 1930s annuals. The annual featured stories with the characters as well as cartoon strips and other non-related stories. A small paperback comic book, Adventures of Pip Squeak & Wilfred, was published in the early 1920s in the Merry Miniatures series by Home Publicity of London and was just 1.5 by 3 inches (3.8 by 7.6 cm) in size.

== Newspaper supplements ==
The Daily Mirror featured a Saturday 4-page pull-out comic supplement, starting on Saturday 15 October 1921, titled The Adventures of Pip, Squeak and Wilfred : No 1 - Thrills in the Dog and cat. Later editions were reduced to 3 pages on 25 March 1922, then to 2 pages on 8 July 1922 until the supplement ended in 1924. The popularity of Pip, Squeak & Wilfred was immense. The 16 December 1922 edition of the Daily Mirror reported 100,000 copies of the 1923 Pip and Squeak Annual had been sold.

== In military terminology ==
=== War medals ===
After the First World War (1914–18), three medals were awarded to most of the British servicemen who had served from 1914 or 1915. They were either the 1914 Star or the 1914–15 Star, the British War Medal and the British Victory Medal. They were irreverently referred to as Pip, Squeak and Wilfred respectively.

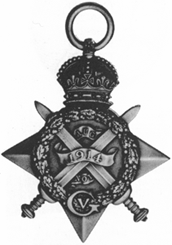
The 1914 Star – 'Pip'

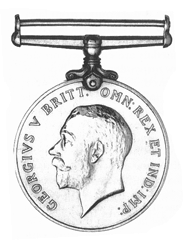
The British War Medal – 'Squeak'

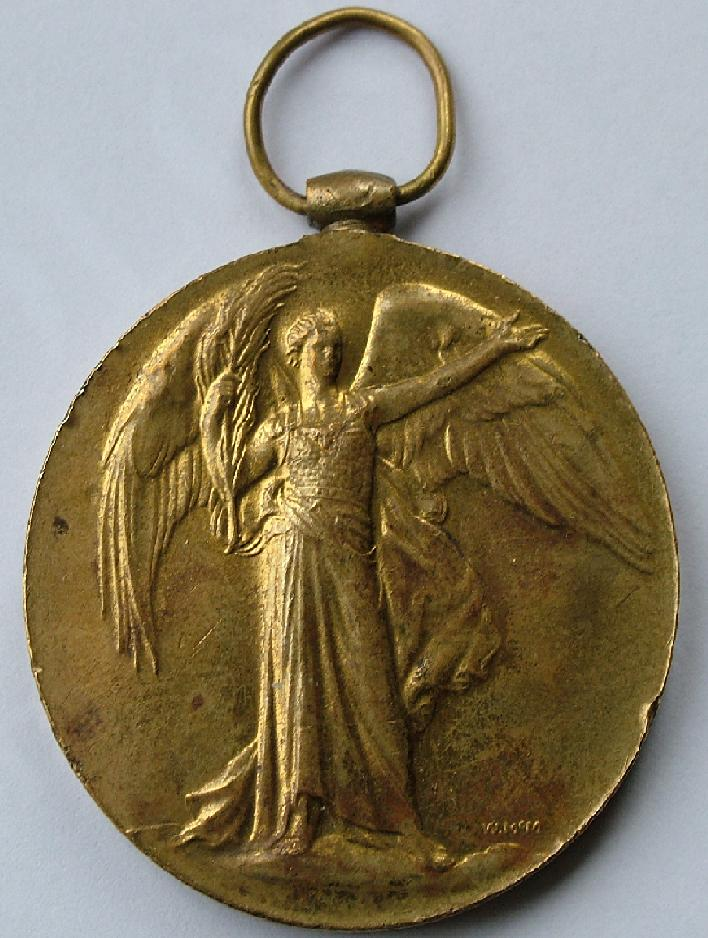
The British Victory Medal – 'Wilfred'

=== Royal Air Force ===
After the First World War the Royal Air Force named its three Blackburn Kangaroo training aircraft Pip, Squeak and Wilfred.

During the Second World War Pip-squeak was the code name of a radio–navigation system fitted to some RAF fighters. This periodically transmitted 15-second tones from the aircraft's radio. These signals were used by ground-based radio direction finder stations to determine the location of the aircraft.

In early 1944 the radio callsign GUGNUNC was used by 255 Squadron in southern Italy. The squadron's Operations Record Book makes specific reference to this in the context of a search for a missing Beaufighter.

=== Palestine, 1936 ===
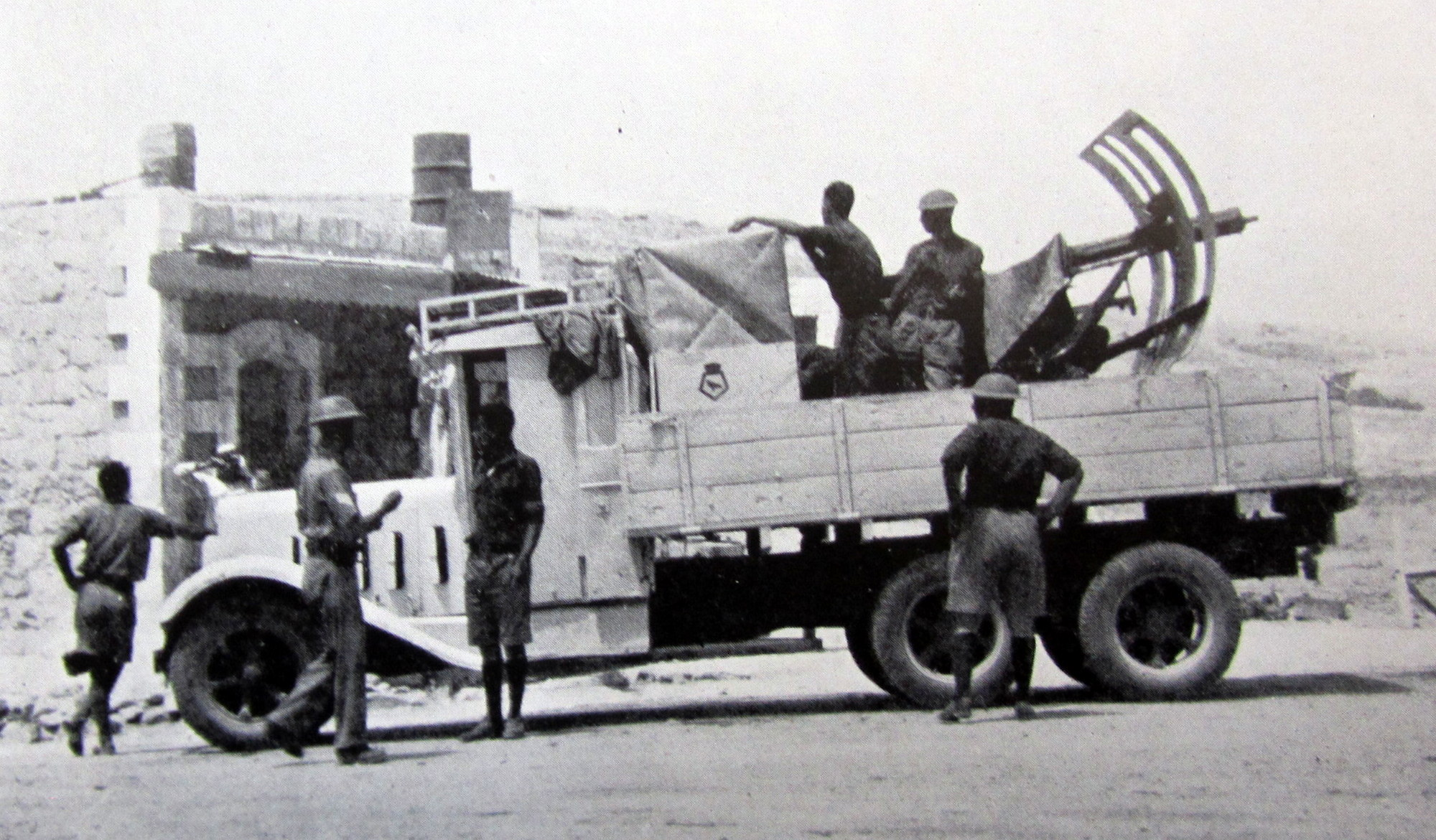
'Pip', a truck-mounted QF 2-pounder naval gun, during operations against the Arab Revolt in Palestine, 1936

During the first stage of the 1936–1939 Arab revolt in Palestine two anti-aircraft guns and one searchlight were taken, with their crews, from HMS Sussex (96) and mounted on trucks in order to provide fire support to ground units. These were named 'Pip' (a two-pounder QF 2-pounder naval gun), 'Squeak' (a QF 3-pounder Vickers gun) and 'Wilfred' (the searchlight).

=== Operation Wilfred ===
Operation Wilfred was a 1940 operation, during the Phoney War, to mine the waters off the Norwegian coast in an attempt to restrict the supply of iron ore from Sweden to Germany. The name was coined by Winston Churchill and inspired by the comic series. In The Gathering Storm Churchill explains that the operation was so called because it was so small.

=== Gun sites ===
Stationed in France to guard the airfields of the RAF's Advanced Air Striking Force during the Phoney War, 53rd (City of London) Heavy Anti-Aircraft Regiment, Royal Artillery, code-named its gun-sites PIP I & II, SQUEAK I & II and WILFRED I & II. (Regimental HQ was codenamed PIXO.)
