= Fantasy comics =

Comic genre

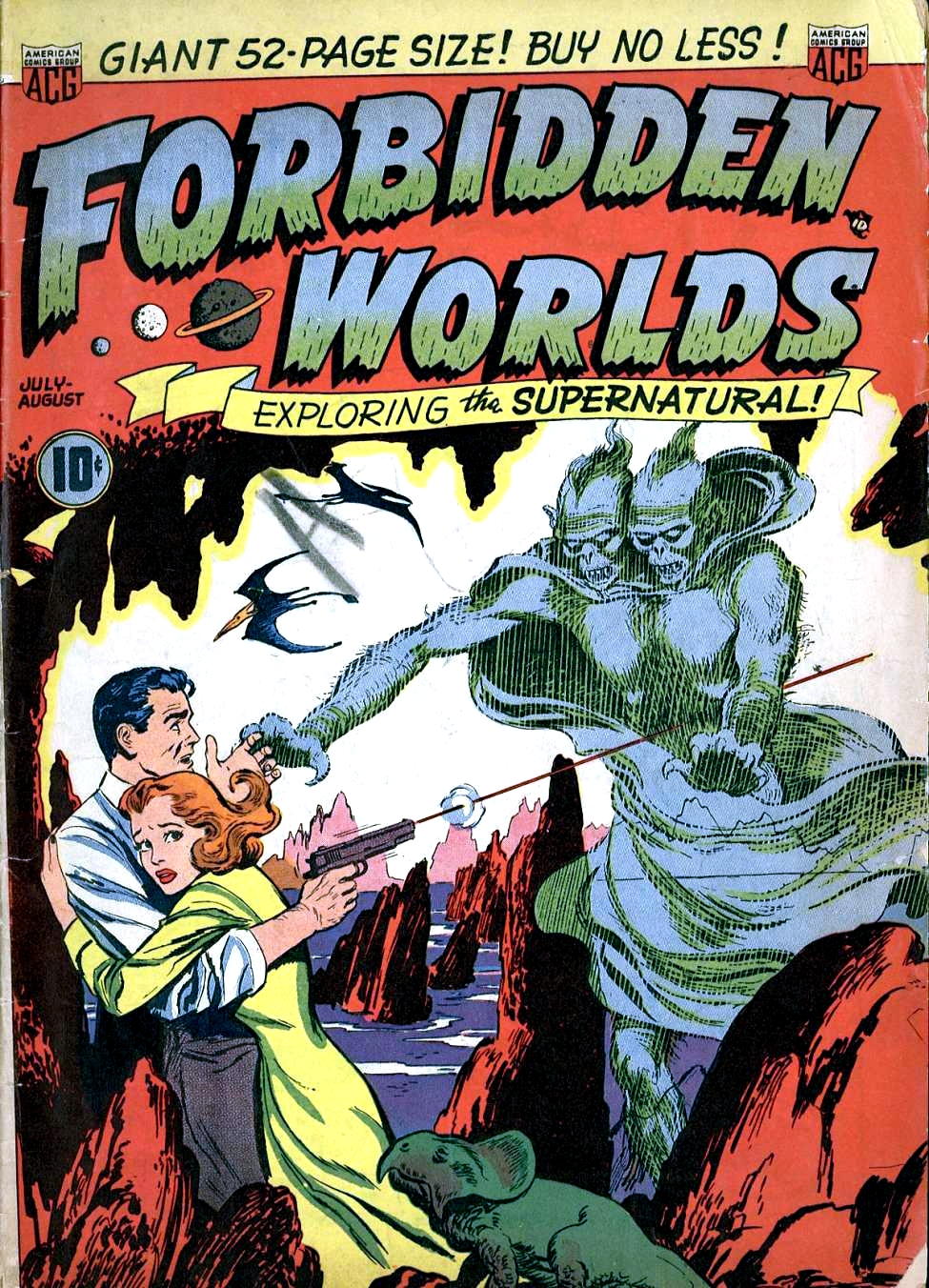
- Forbidden Worlds a common example of 1950s fantasy anthologies
- Authors: Steve Ditko; Frank Frazetta; Wally Wood; Gaylord Dubois
- Publications: Elfquest; Tarzan; House of Mystery

Subgenres
- Wuxia comics; Fairy tale comics; Science fantasy comics

Related genres
- Horror comics

Fantasy comics have been around as long as comics. The classification "fantasy comics" broadly encompasses illustrated books set in an other-worldly universe or involving elements or actors outside our reality. Fantasy has been a mainstay of fiction for centuries, but burgeoned in the late 1930s and early 1940s, spurred by authors such as C. S. Lewis and J. R. R. Tolkien. They inspired comic book producers. Fantasy-themed books—driven by superhero comics gaining popularity through the 1960s—grew to dominate the field. In the 1990s, authors such as Neil Gaiman helped expand the genre with his critically acclaimed Sandman series.

== History ==
In the American market, fantasy comics began in the Golden Age of Comic Books, which was populated with notable works such as All-American Publications (and later DC Comics). Greek myth inspired super heroes including Wonder Woman and Dell's Tarzan.

Starting in the late 1940s, horror-themed fantasy anthologies gained prominence, including EC Comics' Tales from the Crypt, Haunt of Fear, and Vault of Horror; and titles such as American Comics Group Adventures into the Unknown and Forbidden Worlds. This trend faded with the publication of Dr. Fredric Wertham's book Seduction of the Innocent, which led to a Senate hearing that claimed a purported relationship between comics and juvenile violence. Fantasy comics survived in this new atmosphere, though in a diminished capacity.

Fantasy-themed super heroes continued to populate comics through the 1950s and regained popularity in the 1960s with such characters as Steve Ditko's Doctor Strange published by Marvel Comics and Jack Kirby's Thor.

In the 1970s, Conan the Barbarian, created by Robert E. Howard, became one of the most popular publications of Marvel Comics.

In the 1990s, The Sandman, created by Neil Gaiman, Sam Kieth and Mike Dringenberg took comics on a more literary path.

== Notable creators ==
- Al Feldstein
- Frank Frazetta
- Otto Binder
- Gardner Fox
- Steve Ditko
- Jack Kirby
- Moebius
- Joe Orlando
- Osamu Tezuka
- Bernie Wrightson
- Hal Foster
- Jim Starlin
- Neil Gaiman
- Al Williamson
- Wallace Wood

== Adaptations ==
Several fantasy manga have been adapted into anime television series, including Hakkenden: Eight Dogs of the East (2013), Akame ga Kill! (2014), The Seven Deadly Sins (2014), and Trinity Seven (2014).

On 5 August 2022, The Sandman was released on Netflix. It stars Tom Sturridge as Dream/Morpheus, the titular Sandman. Ten episodes were initially released. An eleventh bonus episode was subsequently released on Netflix on 19 August 2022.

== See also ==
- List of fantasy comics
