= Ellipse Animation =

French animation production company

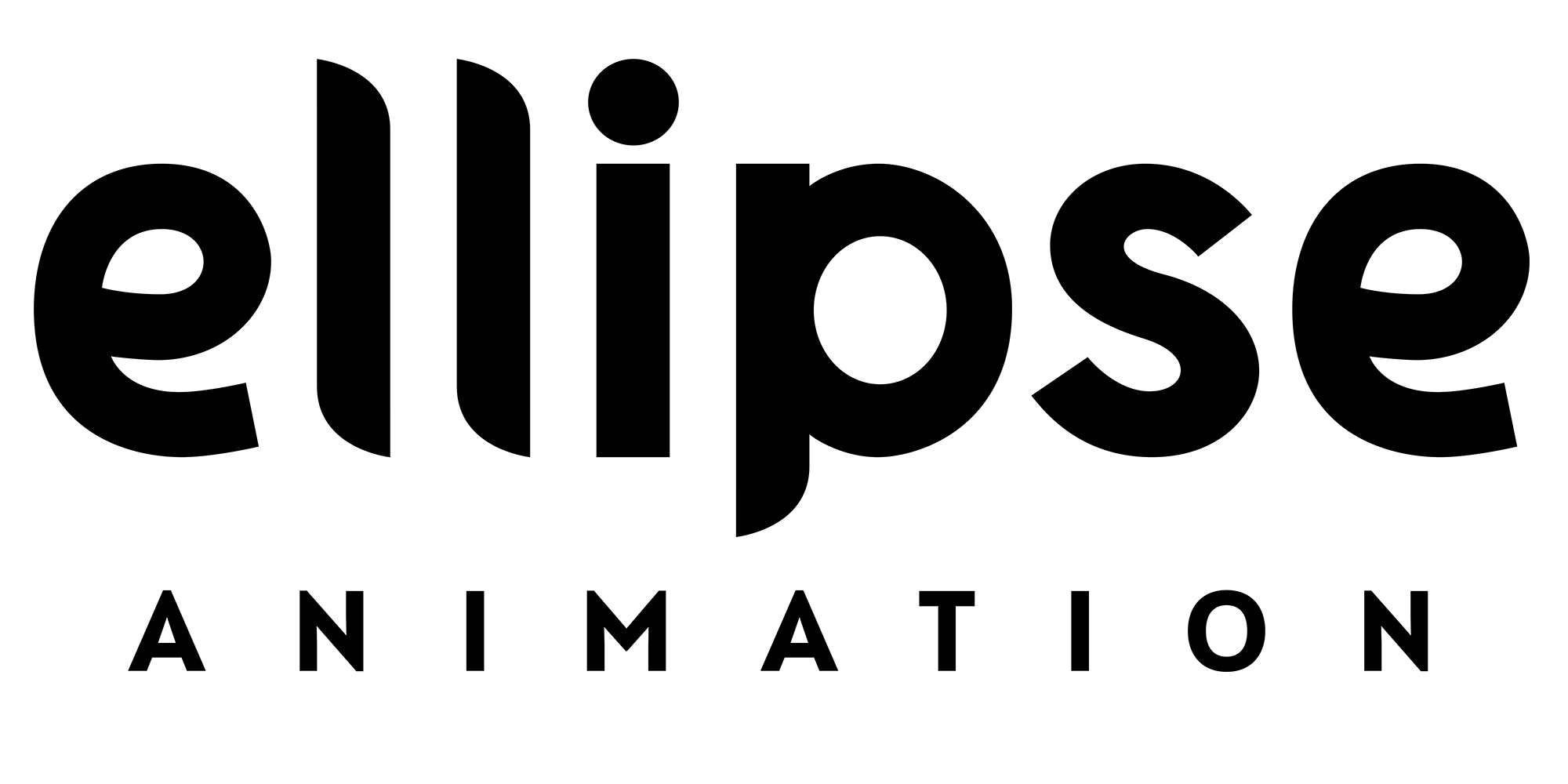
- Type: Subsidiary
- Industry: Animation
- Founded: June 15, 2022; 4 years ago
- Founder: Caroline Audebert
- Headquarters: 57, rue Gaston Tessier, Paris, France
- Key people: Caroline Duvochel (managing director)
- Parent: Média-Participations
- Divisions: Ellipse Studio; Ellipse Studio Angoulême
- Subsidiaries: Dargaud Media; Dupuis Edition & Audiovisuel; Ellipsanime Productions; Studio Campedelli
- Website: www.ellipseanimation.com

Ellipse Animation is a French entertainment group and animation production studio that is a subsidiary of media publishing and entertainment conglomerate Média-Participations whom brings together all of their animation production activities under one group and owns three animation production units (Dargaud Media, Dupuis Edition & Audiovisuel and Ellipsanime Productions) alongside their own in-house animation production studio Ellipse Studio based in both Paris and Angoulême. Across all their production labels, Ellipse Animation produced more than 170 animated series and films.

== Background ==
=== 1967–2004 ===
Ellipse Animation had its very beginnings in 1967, when French publishing house Dargaud began entering the animation production activities by launching its film division Dargaud Films with the release of their first movie Asterix the Gaul. Subsequently, the company produced or co-produced several Asterix, Lucky Luke and Tintin feature films. Five years later in 1972, Dargaud announced that they have teamed up with American production and distributor United Artists to produce the movie Le Viager which was directed by Pierre Tchernia. Two years later in 1974, Dargaud announced that they had joined forces with René Goscinny and Albert Uderzo. By 1990 Claude Berther established animation and production company Marina Productions, however in June 1997, Média-Participations alongside its publishing house Dargaud acquired French animation and production company Marina Productions, the acquisition of Marina Productions had expanded Dargaud's animation output and Média-Participations' production activities with Marina Productions being placed under Dargaud's film & television production division Dargaud Films, marking Dargaud's first animation production subsidiary within Dargaud Films.

Ellipsanime Productions was originally founded in 1987 by Philippe Gildas and Robert Réa with Groupe Canal+ as Ellipse Programme who had created an animation production division three years later in 1990 called Ellipse Animation before merging Ellipse Programme's two other animation studios Alya Animation & Elma Animation and its production facility Studio Ellipse into its Ellipse Animation division seven years later in 1997.

In January 2003, Studio Ellipse, the in-house executive production facility of Ellipsanime announced that it was being shut down by their parent Ellipsanime and had absorbed most of their studio's production activity including their storyboarding and 3-D rendering work under the main animation production company Ellipsanime. A month later in February of that same year, Ellipsanime's former parent company Canal+ Group through its production division StudioExpand announced that they were planning to seek a buyer for their animation studio Ellipsanime with Ellipsanime cutting down their annual series output. Seven months later in July 2003, Média-Participations alongside their publishing house Dargaud announced they had acquired Paris-based French animation production studio Ellipsanime from its previous parent company Canal+ through their division StudioExpand, the acquisition of Ellipsanime gave both Média-Participations and its publishing house Dargaud another animation production studio with its publishing group Dargaud assuming all ownership of Ellipsanime's production activities with Ellipsanime's animated programming portfolio joining Dargaud's own largest animation production studio Dargaud Marina with their distribution division Dargaud Distribution taking over Ellipsanime's programming library and its future projects.

In late-June 2004, Média-Participations expanded its audiovisual production activities when they brought out Belgian/French audiovisual production company Dupuis Audiovisuel alongside its parent publishing house Dupuis and its animation studio Belvision for €300 million. The acquisition of Dupuis Audiovisual and its parent Dupuis gave Média-Participations another animation production studio with Dupuis Audiovisuel's distribution business division Dupuis Distribution being folded into Dargaud Marina's distribution arm Dargaud Distribution as they distributed Dupuis Audiovisuel's production library and would distribute the latter's future television series.

=== 2007–2021 ===
On January 31, 2007, when Média-Participations announced the launch of their subsidiary dedicated to overseeing all of publishing and animation production activities called Mediatoon, Dargaud Marina's international distribution division Dargaud Distribution who distributed Média-Participations' animated production catalogues was moved from Dargaud Media to Média-Participations' new subsidiary Mediatoon, giving Mediatoon their own international distribution division and had it renamed to Mediatoon Distribution with Marie-Pierre Moulinjeune leading the rebranded distribution division whilst continued handling distribution to Média-Participations' programming catalogue.

In January 2014, Ellipsanime had brought out the assets of French animation and production group MoonScoop which went into bankruptcy administration back in July 2013 with the Paris bankruptcy court approved the acquisition as Ellipsanime retaining two of MoonScoop's then-remaining employees and taken over MoonScoop's production library with Dargaud's international distribution division Mediatoon Distribution taking over MoonScoop's programming catalogue except their American division which was spliten. Three years later in October 2017, Ellipsanime Productions had partnered with independent game publishing and digital entertainment company Ankama and established a joint venture 2D animation production studio based in Roubaix, Hauts-de-France named MadLab Animations to handle the two animation studios' own production services alongside Paris and Angoulême-based animation production studio Ellipse Studio for the former.

Six months later in June of that year eight years before the launch of Ellipse Animation, Paris-based animation studio Ellipse Studio announced that they had launched another French animation production studio that would bring all of Média Participations' animated productions under one studio based in Angoulême with the new animation studio being named Ellipse Studio Angoulême with Dargaud Media's CEO & president and former MoonScoop executive Maïa Tubiana heading the new Angoulême-based animation production studio as the Angoulême studio would animate Média Participations' future productions alongside its Paris-based studio Ellipse Studio.

In December 2019 three years before Ellipse Animation was launched and following the departure of Média-Participations' previous CEO & president of its animation production companies and its Paris and Angoulême-based animation production studio Ellipse Studio Maïa Tubiana back in September of that same year, Média-Participations hired Caroline Duvochel as their new CEO of Média-Participations' animation production activities namely Dargaud Media, French/Belgian audiovisuel production company Dupuis Edition & Audiovisuel, Ellipsanime Productions and its Paris and Angoulême-based in-house animation production studio Ellipse Studio.

In May 2021 one year before the launch of production brand Ellipse Animation, Média-Participations hired former Cyber Group Studios executive Caroline Audebert as their deputy head of Média-Participations' new division Média-Participations Development and Innovation which was being headed by Julien Papelier with Caroline Audebert overseeing Média-Participations's own animation production subsidiaries including Dargaud Media, French/Belgian audiovisuel production company Dupuis Edition & Audiovisuel and Ellipsanime Productions (plus their Roubaix-based joint venture animation studio MadLab Animations) alongside their Paris and Angoulême-based in-house animation production studio Ellipse Studio. Former Tele Images Productions & Zodiak Kids director of animation productions and former Watch Next Media studio director Jules Garcia became Ellipse Studio's newly created position of directors

== History ==
Ellipse Animation was formed in June 2022, when Média-Participations announced that they were bringing their French animation production labels (which were Dargaud Media, French/Belgian audiovisuel production company Dupuis Edition & Audiovisuel and Ellipsanime Productions (including Roubaix-based joint venture animation studio MadLab Animations)) along with their Paris and Angoulême-based in-house animation production studio Ellipse Studio under one umbrella group named Ellipse Animation during the annual Annecy International Animation Film Festival with Média-Participations's animation production labels became part of the new production company alongside Paris and Angoulême-based in-house animation production studio Ellipse Studio became Ellipse Animation's new animation studio division.

In January 2023, Ellipse Animation had increased its development by appointing Arnaud Réguillet to expand its production facility and strengthen its Angoulême-based animation production studio Ellipe Studio Angoulême & became its newly-created post of Director at Ellipse Animation's Angoulême-based animation production studio Ellipse Studio Angoulême as the Angoulême-based animation studio Ellipse Studio Angoulême have been relocated to a brand-new, significantly larger office space in Angoulême to boost its production capacity one month later in February of that month & trebled the number of workstations from around 50 to 160 while they would handle animation services for Ellipse Animation's future programming starting with Belfort & Lupin.

In September 2023, Ellipse Animation appointed former executive vice president of distribution at Xilam Animation, Morgann Favennec, to become the company's first vice president of international financing. She manages international co-production and presales of the programming slate and worked alongside the company's founder and managing director Caroline Audebert and the vice president of creative development and strategy Lila Hannou.

In January 2024 two years following the launch of the group, Ellipse Animation announced that they have acquired a majority stake in Milan-based Italian production company Studio Campedelli, expanding Ellipse Animation's production activities for the first time and their first expansion into the Italian animation production services with Studio Campedelli being placed under Ellipse Animation as their own subsidiary with Studio Campedelli CEOs Anne-Sophie Vanhollebeke and Valeria Brambilla continued leading the Italian animation studio under Ellipse Animation giving them an Italian animation production company outside of France. A week later in that same month following Ellipse Animation's acquisition of Studio Campedelli, Ellipse Animation announced that they have expanded their operations into webtoons by launching a production division dedicated to animated series based on digital comics and will sit under Ellipse Animation's own animation production studio Ellipse Studio Angoulême.

== Production companies ==
Ellipse Animation is the umbrella production group that owns three production companies:

- Dupuis Edition & Audiovisuel; established in 1959 by Charles Dupuis as the animation division of Belgian publishing house Dupuis.
- Dargaud Media; founded in 1967 by French publishing house Dargaud. By the late-1990s it had brought two French animation production companies Marina Productions and Millésime Productions and their series joined Dargaud's programming catalogue.
- Ellipsanime Productions; founded in 1987 by journalist Philippe Gildas and Robert Réa, it was originally owned by Canal+ through its division Studio Expand before selling it to French publishing company Dargaud in 2003. It brought MoonScoop's production assets and its programming library in January 2014.
  - MadLab Animations - A Roubaulx-based animation joint-venture production studio between Ellipsanime Productions and independent game publishing & entertainment company Ankama Animations, that handles some of Ellipse Animation's shows such as Kid Lucky.

== Filmography ==
=== Television ===
Title	Years	Network	Label	Notes
My Pet Monster	1987	ABC; Global Television Network (Canada)	Ellipsanime Productions	co-production with Nelvana, Golden Books and Hi-Tops Video
Bouli	1989–1990	France 2	Les Cartooneurs Associés	
Zorro	1990–1993	The Family Channel	Ellipsanime Productions	Live-action series co-production with New World Television, Zorro Productions and Goodman/Rosen Productions
Doug	1991–1994	Nickelodeon	Ellipsanime Productions	co-production with Games Animation and Jumbo Pictures continued and owned by Disney Television Animation whilst Mediatoon Distribution and Paramount Global Content Distribution own the rights to seasons 1–4
Rupert	1991–1997	France 3; YTV (Canada); ITV (United Kingdom)	Ellipsanime Productions	seasons 1–3 only co-production with Nelvana, Television South (season 1) and Scottish Television (seasons 2–5)
Lucky Luke	1991–1992	France 3	Dargaud Media	co-production with IDDH
The Adventures of Tintin	1991–1992	France 3; Global Television Network (Canada)	Ellipsanime Productions	co-production with Nelvana
Journey to the Heart of the World	1993–1994	Canal+	Dargaud Media	co-production with Belvision and Saban International Paris
Baby Follies	1993–1994	Canal+	Les Cartooneurs Associés	co-production with Shanghai Animation Film Studio and C2A
Leo & Popi	1994–1997	France 3	Ellipsanime Productions; Les Cartooneurs Associés	co-production with Canal+ D.A and TAL Productions
The Neverending Story	1995	Canal+; HBO (United States); Family Channel (Canada)	Ellipsanime Productions	co-production with Nelvana and CineVox
Bamboo Bears	1995	Canal J NPO 1 (Netherlands); Kids Station (Japan); ZDF (Germany); TVE2 (Spain)	Dargaud Media	co-production with ZDF Enterprises, Telescreen and Mitsui; Rights owned by Studio 100 International
Mr. Men and Little Miss	1995–1997	France 3; ITV (United Kingdom)	Dargaud Media	co-production with Flicks Films and Mr. Films; Based on the books Mr. Men by Roger Hargreaves
Blazing Dragons	1996–1998	Canal+/France 3/M6; Teletoon (Canada); CITV (United Kingdom)	Ellipsanime Productions	co-production with Nelvana and Carlton Television
Billy the Cat	1996–2001	France 3 S4C (Wales); ZDF (Germany)	Dupuis Edition & Audiovisuel	co-production with EVA Entertainment, Les Films du Triangle, La Fabrique, Network of Animation, Sofidoc, Cologne Cartoon and WIC Entertainment
Flash Gordon	1996–1997	Canal+ & France 3; Syndication (United States); Channel 4 (United Kingdom); YTV (Canada)	Dupuis Edition & Audiovisuel	co-production with Lacewood Productions, Carrere Television, Mediatoon and Hearst Entertainment; Based on the comic strip of the same name by Alex Raymond
Vor-Tech: Undercover Conversion Squad	1996	Syndication (United States)	Dupuis Edition & Audiovisuel	co-production with Universal Cartoon Studios, Mediatoon and Lacewood Productions
Blake and Mortimer	1997	Canal+	Ellipsanime Production; Dargaud Media	co-production with Cactus Animation
Little Hippo	1997–1998	France 3; ZDF (Germany)	Dargaud Media	co-production with EVA Entertainment, Britt Allcroft (Development) Limited and Nerounes
The Mr. Men Show	1997–1999	Syndication (United States)	Dargaud Media	An American adaptation of Mr Men & Little Miss by Roger Hargreaves co-production with Breakthrough Film & Television, Telegenic Programs and Lacey Entertainment
Papyrus	1998–2000	TF1; La Deux (Belgium); YTV (Canada)	Dupuis Edition & Audiovisuel	co-production with Medever
Bob Morane	1998	Canal+; Super Écran (Canada)	Ellipsanime Productions	co-production with Cactus Animation
Trouble with Sophie	1998–1999	France 3 & Canal J	Ellipsanime Productions	co-production with Medialab
Pirate Family	1999–2004	France 3; Radio-Canada (Canada)	Ellipsanime Productions	
Kong: The Animated Series	2000–2001	M6	Ellipsanime Productions	co-production with BKN International
Nick & Perry	2000–2001	M6; Kika (Germany)	Ellipsanime Productions	Previously known as Nick and Perry-Alien Dogs; co-production with EM.TV & Merchandising AG, Victory Media Group and Trickfilmcompany Rights held by Studio 100 International
Largo Winch	2001–2002	M6; RTL-TVI (Belgium); ProSieben (Germany); Global Television Network (Canada)	Dupuis Edition & Audiovisuel	Live-action series co-production with Paramount International Television, Tandem Communications, TVA International and Betafilm
Xcalibur	2001–2002	Canal+ & France 2; YTV (Canada)	Ellipsanime Productions	co-production with TVA International (episodes 1–25) and Tooncan Productions (episodes 26–40)
The New Adventures of Lucky Luke	2001–2003	France 3 Super RTL (Germany); Tele Quebec (Canada)	Dargaud Media (Note: Credited as Dargaud Marina)	co-production with Xilam Animation, Lucky Comics and Tooncan Productions
Agrilppine	2001	Canal+ Arte France	Ellipsanime Productions	
Lost World of Sir Arthur Conan Doyle	2002	Télétoon	Dargaud Media	co-production with Neuroplanet and Vivatoon
Kitou, the Six-Eyed Monster	2002–2003	TF1; Vrak TV (Canada)	Dargaud Media	co-production with Belvision and Tooncan Productions
Cédric	2002–2007	France 3 Canal J (seasons 1–2); RTBF (Belgium)	Dupuis Edition & Audiovisuel	co-production with Neptuno Films (season 1) and Araneo (season 2)
Jacques Cousteau's Ocean Tales	2003	France 3; YTV & Tele-Quebec (Canada)	Dargaud Media	co-production with Vivatoon
Martin Morning	2003–2018	France 3	Les Cartooneurs Associés	co-production with Fantasia Animation
Kid Paddle	2003–2006	M6 & Canal J; RTBF (Belgium); Teletoon (Canada)	Dupuis Edition & Audiovisuel	co-production with Spectra Animation
Corto Maltese	2003–2004	Canal+ & France 2; Rai 3 (Italy)	Ellipsanime Productions	co-production with Rai Fiction and Pomaulx
The Frog Show	2003–2005	M6	Ellipsanime Productions	co-production with D'Ocon Films and Agogo
Trotro	2004–2005	France 5	Storimages	co-production with 2 Minutes
Boule et Bill	2005	TF1 & Télétoon	Dargaud Media	co-production with Tooncan Productions and Bell Ombre Films
Miss BG	2005–2007	France 5 & Tiji TVOntario (Canada)	Ellipsanime Productions	co-production with Breakthrough Films & Television and Def2shoot
Shaolin Wuzang	2005–2006	France 3; Jetix Europe (International); ZDF (Germany); TV 2 (Denmark)	Les Cartooneurs Associés	co-production with ZDF Enterprises and Fantasia Animation
Yakari	2005–2017	France 3; WDR (seasons 3–5)	Storimages; Ellipsanime Productions (seasons 3–5); Les Cartooneurs Associés (Note: Credited as Les Cartooneurs) (season 4); Dargaud Media (season 5)	co-production Belvision, ARD (seasons 3–5) and 2 Minutes
Potlach	2006	France 3 Rai 3 (Italy)	Ellipsanime Productions	co-production with Rai Fiction
Rintindumb	2006–2007	France 3	Dargaud Media	co-production with Xilam Animation and Lucky Comics
Time Jam: Valerian & Laureline	2007–2008	France 3	Dargaud Media	co-production with EuropaCorp and Satelight
The Magic Roundabout	2007–2009	M6 & Playhouse Disney France; Nick Jr. (United Kingdom)	Ellipsanime Productions	co-production with Les Films Action, Action Synthese and Play Production
Inami	2007–2008	TF1	Ellipsanime Productions	co-production with Seahorse–Anim, JPF Productions, TTK and Araneo
Bird Squad	2008–2009	Rai 2 (Italy)	Ellipsanime Productions	Originally titled Bird's Band; co-production with Toposodo, Araneo and Rai Fiction
The Garfield Show	2008–2016	France 3 Cartoon Network/Boomerang (United States)	Dargaud Media	co-production with Paws, Inc. Based on the comic strip series Garfield by Jim Davis
Taratabong	2009	Rai 3	Ellipsanime Productions	co-production with Toposodo and Rai Fiction
Chumballs	2009	France 5	Ellipsanime Productions	co-production with Les Films de la Perrine
Contraptus	2009–2010	Canal J & Gulli	Ellipsanime Productions	co-production with Le Lombard and Araneo
The Daltons	2010–2016	France 3	Dargaud Media	co-production with Xilam Animation, Lucky Comics and B Media Kids; Owned by Xilam Animation
Yummy Toonies	2010	Gulli	Ellipsanime Productions	co-production with Cherry Picking
The Jungle Book	2010–2020	TF1/Piwi+ ZDF (Germany)	Ellipsanime Productions; Les Cartooneurs Associés	Took over production from MoonScoop co-production with DQ Entertainment and ZDF Enterprises; Rights owned by ZDF Studios
Tempo Express	2011	France 3	Les Cartooneurs Associés	co-production with Fantasia Animation
Quiz Time	2011	Disney Junior France	Ellipsanime Productions	co-production with Studio Redfrog
Chicken Town	2011	Canal+ Family & OCS	Ellipsanime Productions	co-production with 1st Day Studios and Araneo; Based on the short of the same name by Klasky Csupo
Little Spirou	2012–2015	M6 & Teletoon+; La Trois (Belgium)	Dupuis Edition & Audiovisuel	co-production with LuxAnimation, Araneo and RTBF
Linkers: Secret Codes	2014–2015	Canal J & Gulli; Rai Gulp (Italy)	Ellipsanime Productions; Les Cartooneurs Associés	Originally titled Cross Worlds; co-production with Enanimation, Rai Fiction and World Dong Man Company
Kinky and Cosy	2014	OCS	Ellipsanime Productions	co-production with Belvision
H2O: Mermaid Adventures	2015	France 3; ZDF (Germany); Netflix (Worldwide)	Les Cartooneurs Associés	co-production with ZDF Enterprises, Jonathan M. Shiff Productions and Fantasia Animation; Based on the live-action series H2O: Just Add Water by Jonathan M. Shiff; Rights co-owned with ZDF Studios
Boule et Bill	2016–2018	France 3 & Piwi+; RTBF (Belgium)	Dargaud Media; Ellipsanime Productions (season 1); Dupuis Edition & Audiovisuel (season 2)	co-production with Belvision
Little Furry	2017–2021	Piwi+ La Trois & Ketnet (Belgium)	Dupuis Edition & Audiovisuel; Dargaud Media	co-production with Belvision
The Fox/Badger Family	2018–2022	France 5	Dargaud Media; Ellipsanime Productions	co-production with Philm CGI
Garfield Originals	2019–2020	France 3; Nick.com (United States)	Dargaud Media	co-production with Paws, Inc.
Roger & His Humans	2020–present	YouTube/Animation Digital Network	Dupuis Edition & Audiovisuel	
Kid Lucky	2020	M6; Rai Gulp (Italy)	Dargaud Media; Ellipsanime Productions	co-production with Belvision and Rai Ragazzi
The Smurfs	2021–present	TF1; La Trois & Ketnet (Belgium); Kika (Germany); Nickelodeon (International)	Dupuis Edition & Audiovisuel; Dargaud Media (season 1); Les Cartooneurs Associés (season 2); Ellipsanime Productions (season 3–)	co-production with Peyo Productions
Living with Dad	2022–present	M6, Canal J & Gulli; La Trois (Belgium)	Dupuis Edition & Audiovisuel; Ellipsanime Productions	co-production with Belvision; Based on the comic book series Dad by Nob
Belfort & Lupin	2025	France 4; Auvio Kids TV & Ketnet (Belgium); Radio-Canada (Canada); SWR (Germany)	Ellipsanime Productions; Dargaud Media	co-production with Belvision and Mediatoon Distribution
The Marsupilamis	2025–present	Gulli & M6; Auvio Kids TV & Ketnet (Belgium); Radio-Canada (Canada); Nickelodeon (International)	Dupuis Edition & Audiovisuel; Dargaud Media	co-production with Belvision and Mediatoon Distribution
Trotro and Zaza	2025–present	France 5; Rai Yoyo (Italy)	Ellipsanime Productions; Dupuis Edition & Audiovisuel	co-production with Studio Campedelli, Mediatoon Distribution and Rai Kids
Dreamland	2026	Animation Digital Network & France 4; ABC Asahi (Japan); Crunchyroll (International)	Dupuis Edition & Audiovisuel	co-production with La Chouette Compangie
Animal Jack	TBA	TF1	Ellipsanime Productions	Based on the comic book series by Kid Toussaint and Miss Prickly

=== Film ===
Title	Release date	Distributor	Label	Notes
Asterix the Gaul	December 20, 1967; December 23, 1967 (Belgium)	Athos Films	Dargaud Media	co-production with Belvision
Asterix and Cleopatra	December 19, 1968; December 21, 1968 (Belgium)	Pathé	Dargaud Media	co-production with Belvision and Edifilm
Daisy Town	December 20, 1971	Les Artistes Associés	Dargaud Media	Based on the comics Lucky Luke co-production with Belvision
Tintin and the Lake of Sharks	December 13, 1972	Les Artistes Associés	Dargaud Media	co-production with Belvision
The Smurfs and the Magic Flute	December 24, 1975	Mercury Films	Dupuis Edition & Audiovisuel	co-production with Belvision, Lafig S.A and IMPS
Babar: The Movie	July 28, 1989	Fourm Distribution; Astral Films (Canada)	Ellipsanime Productions	co-production with Nelvana and The Clifford Ross Company
Becassine and the Viking Treasure	December 12, 2001	Gebaka Films	Ellipsanime Productions	co-production with Home Made Movies and Image Film
Go West! A Lucky Luke Adventure	December 5, 2007	Pathé Distribution; Alliance Vivafilm (Canada)	Dargaud Media	co-production with Xilam Animation, Lucky Comics, France 3 Cinema, Pathé, TPS Star, Cinecinema and Mikros Image
Zombillenium	October 18, 2017	Gebaka Films	Dupuis Edition & Audiovisuel	co-production with Belvision, Universal Pictures International France, Maybe Movies, 2 Minutes and France 3 Cinema
Tricky Old Dogs	August 22, 2018	Gaumont	Dargaud Media	Live-action film co-production with Radar Films, France 3 Cinema, Cinécap, Dargaud, Entourage Pictures and Egérie Productions
Yakari, A Spectacular Journey	August 12, 2020	BAC Films; Leonine Distribution (Germany)	Dargaud Media; Dupuis Edition & Audiovisuel	co-production with Belvision, Le Lombard, BAC Film Production, Leonine Production, WunderWerk, Gao Shang Pictures, WDR and France 3 Cinema

=== Specials ===
Title	Release date	Commissioner	Label	Notes
Akissi: A Funny Little Brother	June 14, 2022	France 4	Ellipsanime Productions; Les Cartooneurs Associés	co-production with GHWA Productions

== Studio Campedelli ==
Studio Campedelli is a prominent Italian animation production company that is a subsidiary of French entertainment production group Ellipse Animation, in turn to be owned by Média-Participations, that was founded in 2008 by Pietro Campedelli, based in Milan and Turin. It specializes in creating animated audiovisual content for children, including popular series such as Calimero, Atchoo!, and Tip the Mouse.

On February 29 2012, Studio Campedelli partneted with German media & brand management production/distributor Made 4 Entertainment (m4e) to develop a CGI adaptation of Anna Casalis & Marco Campanella's book series Tip the Mouse, with the book series' Italian publisher Giunti Editore and Milan-based animation studio Studio Bozzetto & Co co-producing the series.
