= Ellipsanime =

French animation studio

Ellipsanime Productions
- Logo used since 2004
- Formerly: Le Studio Ellipse (1987–1990); Ellipse Programme (1990–2000)
- Type: Division
- Industry: Animation
- Predecessor: MoonScoop (2003–2014)
- Founded: 1987; 39 years ago
- Founder: Philippe Gildas; Robert Réa
- Headquarters: 57, rue Gaston Tessier, Paris, France
- Key people: Caroline Duvochel (managing director)
- Products: Animated television series Animated feature films
- Parent: Canal+ (1987–2000); Expand SA (2000–2003); Dargaud (2003–2022); Ellipse Animation (2022–present)
- Subsidiaries: MadLab Animations
- Website: www.ellipseanimation.com

Ellipsanime Productions (formerly known as Le Studio Ellipse and Ellipse Programme) is a French animation studio that produces television programs and its part of entertainment production group Ellipse Animation, the animation production subsidiary of media conglomerate and publishing company Média Participations. It was founded in 1987. In February 2000 it merged with Expand SA; Expand sold the company to Dargaud in 2003, and it became Ellipsanime in 2004. In 2014, Ellipsanime bought the assets of Moonscoop SA.

Ellipse has worked with many other animation companies, with the most reputable being Nelvana and Nickelodeon. Ellipse was best known in North America for co-producing seasons 2-4 of Nickelodeon's Doug; it did not return to the series after The Walt Disney Company bought the Doug intellectual property and Jumbo Pictures.

On the occasion of the Annecy International Animation Film Festival in June 2022, the Média-Participations group announced the creation of an umbrella brand knows as Ellipse Animation which brings together its production labels in France, Ellipsanime, Dargaud Media and Dupuis Edition & Audiovisuel.

== History ==
In 1987, the company was founded by Philippe Gildas and Robert Réa under the name Ellipse Programme with Canal+ as their first owner. Three years later in 1990, Ellipse Programme entered the animation production genre by launching their own animation division.

At the start of July 1997, Ellipse Programme had spliten its scripted & animation production unit into two new divisions with the drama division retaining the Ellipse Programme name while the animation unit was entitled Ellipse Animation (which would be used by Média-Participation's production group of the same name 25 years later in June 2022) as Ellipse Programme's animation subsidiaries Elma Animation and Le Sabre Animation was placed under the new animation division with Ellipse Animation as it would plan to produce new animated programming.

In 1997, Ellipse Programme had merged together their animation production subsidiaries which were Alya Animation, Elma Animation and production facility Studio Ellipse into its main animation production division Ellipse Animation.

In October 1998, Ellipsanime had appointed former Tele Images head of animated co-productions, Marie-Pierre Moulinjeune, as its deputy director who will supervise the international development and co-production for Ellipsanime's then-upcoming programming state.

In February 2000, Canal+ announced that they've merged their subsidiary Ellipse Programme with French television production outfit Expand Images into one group under the Expand name with Ellipse Programme becoming Expand Group's own division alongside Canal+ holding a 35% stake in the Expand Group. Eight months later in October of that year following the merger of Ellipse Programme with French television production group Expand back in February of the year, Ellipse Programme's licensing arm Ellipse License had been transferred to Canal+'s in-house film & television production/distribution division StudioCanal and became StudioCanal's new in-house licensing division as it was renamed to StudioCanal License.

In January 2003, Ellipsanime had announced that they were shutting down their executive production facility Ellipse Studio and had absorbed most of their studio's production activity including their storyboarding and 3-D rendering work under the main animation production company. A month later in February of that same year, Ellipsanime's then parent company Canal+ Group and its film production and distribution company StudioCanal under their subsidiary StudioExpand announced that they were planning to sell their animation studio Ellipsanime along with 19 other production companies that made up StudioExpand with Ellipsanime cutting down their annual series output.

On July 22, 2003, it was announced that French media entertainment conglomerate Média-Participations alongside their French publishing house Dargaud had brought Ellipsanime from its previous parent company Canal+ through their division StudioExpand, the acquisition gave both Dargaud and its parent Média-Participations and another animation production studio with Dargaud assuming all ownership of Ellipsanime's production activities alongside its animated programming portfolio which joined Dargaud's own largest animation and production division Dargaud Marina with its distribution division Dargaud Distribution (now Mediatoon Distribution) taking over Ellipsanime's production library along with their future projects.

In October 2008, Ellipsanime Productions and Média-Participations' international distribution arm Mediatoon Distribution had colloaborated with the French lifestyle & teen fashion brand Kawaïko to develop a multiplatform cross-media and multimedia project entitled KWK 360, the project would feature Kawaïko's four anime-style teenage fictional characters, Kima, Elea, Miio and Lina, during their time at a prestigious Paris fashion school, Le Cours St Honoré, Ellipsanime Productions would produce the priject with Kawaïko & have been presented at MIPCOM at that year, but that series have been unproduced ever since.

On January 4, 2009 Ellipsanime announced that it would acquired Shortcut Design Post Production for 99% million. The two companies previously team up on projects released in December 2006.

In January 2011, Ellipsanime was planning to produce a new adaptation of the French/Belgian comic book series Cubitis with Média-Participations' fellow animation production studio Storimages according to Ellipsanime's former website with the titular character being placed onto the background of another show The Garfield Show (which was made by Ellipsanime's fellow unit Dargaud Media) with the titular character dancing, but since then they had no plans to produce the new adaptation of Cubitis. Four months later in May of that year, Ellipsanime partnered with Vancoucer-based Canadian animation studio Atomic Cartoons to produce the animated series for Teletoon entitled Pirate Express which was originally a French/Canadian co-production. However two years later in July 2013, Ellipsanime depatured the animated series when Pirate Express was greenlighted as Sydney-based Australian animation & production company Sticky Pictures taken over the series and was turned into an Australian/Canadian co-production.

In January 2014, Ellipsanime announced that under the Paris bankruptcy court they've acquired the assets of French animation and production group MoonScoop which went into bankruptcy administration in July 2013 with Ellipsanime retaining two of MoonScoop's then-remaining employees and taken over MoonScoop's production library with Dargaud's international distribution division Mediatoon Distribution taking over MoonScoop's programming catalog except their American division which was split. One year later in October 2015 following Ellipsanime's acquisition of MoonScoop's programming library, they partnered with Indian animation studio DQ Entertainment and German production & distribution unit ZDF Enterprises to produce the third season of The Jungle Book, marking Ellipsanime Productions' only series that was inherited from MoonScoop.

By August 2015, Ellipsanime Productions had closed its website with them announcing its return with a new look website. The site originally stated it would plan to launch in "November 2015". However the launch of Ellipsanime Productions' new website was delayed to "April 2016" and later to "June 2016" In November 2016, after significant delays it was announced that Ellipsanime Productions' website would be merged into Dargaud Media's own website.

In October 2017, Ellipsanime Productions had partnered with independent game publishing and digital entertainment company Ankama under the latter's division Ankama Animations to establish a joint-venture 2D animation production studio based in Roubaix, Hauts-de-France named MadLab Animations to handle the two animation studios' own production services alongside Média-Participations' fellow main Paris and Angoulême-based animation production studio Ellipse Studio for the former.

In December 2019, following the departure of Média-Participations' previous CEO and president of its animation production companies and their Paris and Angoulême-based animation production studio Ellipse Studio Maïa Tubiana back in September of that same year, Ellipsanime Productions' parent company Média-Participations announced that they've hired Caroline Duvochel as their new CEO of Média-Participations' animation production activities namely Ellipsanime Productions (along with their Roubaix-based joint venture animation studio MadLab Animations), Dargaud Media and French/Belgian audiovisuel production company Dupuis Edition & Audiovisuel along with its Paris and Angoulême-based in-house animation production studio Ellipse Studio. Former Tele Images Productions and Zodiak Kids director of animation productions and former Watch Next Media studio director Jules Garcia became Paris and Angoulême-based animation production studio Ellipse Studio's newly created position of directors

In May 2021, Ellipsanime Productions's parent company Média-Participations announced that they've hired former Cyber Group Studios executive Caroline Audebert as their deputy head of Média-Participations' new division Média-Participations Development and Innovation which was being headed by Julien Papelier with Caroline Audebert overseeing Média-Participations' own animation production subsidiaries including Ellipsanime Productions (including their Roubaix-based joint venture animation studio MadLab Animations), Dargaud Media and French/Belgian audiovisuel production company Dupuis Edition & Audiovisuel alongside their in-house Paris and Angoulême-based animation production studio Ellipse Studio.

In June 2022 during the Annecy International Animation Film Festival, Ellipsanime Productions alongside their parent Media Participations announced that they were bringing their French animation production labels (which were Ellipsanime Productions (including their Roubaix-based joint venture animation studio MadLab Animations), Dargaud Media and French/Belgian audiovisuel production company Dupuis Edition & Audiovisuel) alongside their in-house Paris and Angoulême-based animation production studio Ellipse Studio under one umbrella group named Ellipse Animation, returning to the Ellipse Animation name after 24 years with Ellipsanime Productions being placed under Ellipse Animation as their production label.

In January 2024, Ellipsanime Productions's parent company Ellipse Animation announced that they have acquired a majority stake in Milan-based Italian production company Studio Campedelli, expanding Ellipse Animation's production activities for the first time and their first expansion into the Italian animation production services with Studio Campedelli being placed under Ellipse Animation as their own subsidiary with Studio Campedelli CEOs Anne-Sophie Vanhollebeke and Valeria Brambilla continued leading the Italian animation studio under Ellipse giving them an Italian animation production company outside of France. A week later Ellipse Animation announced that they've expanded their operations into webtoons by launching a production division dedicated to animated series based on digital comics and will sit under Ellipse Animation's own animation production studio Ellipse Studio Angoulême.

On July 28, 2028 Ellipsanime Productions announced that it would closed Araneo, a Belgian film production company based in Marcinelle, after producing its final project Toy Story 5. On July 29, 2028, Paramount Pictures through Paramount Global acquired Araneo’s assets as part of Ellipsanime’s deal with Paramount Pictures and rebranded its Belgian operations.

== Filmography ==
=== TV series ===
Title	Year(s)	Network	Notes
My Pet Monster	1987	ABC; Global Television Network (Canada)	co-production with Nelvana, Golden Books and Hi-Tops Video
Zorro	1990–1993	The Family Channel	co-production with New World Television, Zorro Productions and Goodman/Rosen Productions
Doug	1991–1994	Nickelodeon	co-production with Games Animation and Jumbo Pictures; continued and owned by Disney Television Animation whilst Mediatoon Distribution and Paramount Global Content Distribution own the rights to seasons 1–4
Rupert	1991–1997	France 3; YTV (Canada); ITV (United Kingdom)	seasons 1–3 only; co-production with Nelvana, Television South (season 1) and Scottish Television (seasons 2–5)
The Adventures of Tintin	1991–1992	France 3 Global Television Network (Canada)	co-production with Nelvana
Quarxs	1993	Canal+ and France 3	co-production with Z.A Production
Orson and Olivia	1994	Canal+; Rai Uno (Italy)	
Tom & Pippo	1994–1997	France 3	under Ellipse License and Elma Animation with Les Cartooneurs Associés, Canal+ D.A and TAL Productions
Mot	1995	Canal+; France 3	
The Neverending Story	1995	Canal+; HBO (United States); Family Channel (Canada)	co-production with Nelvana and CineVox
Blazing Dragons	1996–1998	Canal+/France 3/M6; Teletoon (Canada); CITV (United Kingdom)	co-production with Nelvana and Carlton Television
Blake and Mortimer	1997	Canal+	co-production with Dargaud Films and Cactus Animation
Nanook's Great Hunt	1997–1998	TF1; Teletoon	co-production with Medver International and Mediatoon
Fennec	1997–1998	France 3	co-production with Cactus Animation and Motion International
Bob Morane	1998	Canal+ Super Écran (Canada)	co-production with Cactus Animation
Trouble with Sophie	1998–1999	France 3 & Canal J	under Ellipse Story and Alya Animation co-production with Medialab
Fracasse	1999–2000	France 2	co-production with D'Ocon Films
Pirate Family	1999–2004	France 3 Radio-Canada (Canada)	
Kong: The Animated Series	2000–2001	M6	co-production with BKN International
Nick & Perry	2000–2001	M6; Kika (Germany)	Previously known as Nick and Perry-Alien Dogs|co-production with EM.TV & Merchandising AG, Victory Media Group and Trickfilmcompany; Owned by Studio 100 International
Babar	2001	France 3 TVOntario (Canada)	co-production with Nelvana, TV-Loonland and Kodansha
The Funny Little Bugs	2001	France 3	
Xcalibur	2001–2002	Canal+ & France 2 YTV (Canada)	co-production with TVA International (episodes 1–25) and Tooncan Productions (episodes 26–40)
Agrilppine	2001	Canal+ Arte France	
Corto Maltese	2003–2004	Canal+/France 2 Rai 3 (Italy)	co-production with Rai Fiction and Pomalux
The Frog Show	2003–2005	M6	co-production with D'Ocon Films and Agogo
Miss BG	2005–2006	France 5 & Tiji; TVOntario (Canada)	co-production with Breakthrough Films & Television and Def2shoot
Yakari	2005–2017	France 3; La Deux/La Une (Belgian); WDR (Germany)	Joined the series for season 3 until season 5; co-production with Storimages, Belvision, Les Cartooneurs Associés (season 4), Dargaud Media (season 5), ARD (seasons 3–5) and 2 Minutes
Potlach	2006	France 3 Rai 3 (Italy)	co-production with Rai Fiction
The Magic Roundabout	2007–2009	M6 & Playhouse Disney France; Nick Jr. (United Kingdom)	co-production with Films Action and Play Production
Inami	2007–2008	TF1	co-production with Seahorse–Anim, JPF Productions, TTK and Araneo
The Notekins	2008-2026	BabyFirst	co-production with Sesame Workshop and Araneo
Bird Squad	2008–2009	Rai 2 (Italy)	Originally titled Bird's Band; co-production with Toposodo, Araneo and Rai Fiction
Taratabong	2009	Rai 3	Originally titled Happy Music co-production with Toposodo and Rai Fiction; acquired by Out of the Blue Enterprises on January 2, 2018
Chumballs	2009	France 5	co-production with Les Films de la Perrine
Contraptus	2009–2010	Canal J & Gulli	co-production with Le Lombard
Yummy Toonies	2010	Gulli	co-production with Cherry Picking
The Jungle Book	2010–2020	TF1/Piwi+ Nickelodeon India (India); ZDF (Germany)	inherited from MoonScoop co-production with Les Cartooneurs Associés, DQ Entertainment and ZDF Enterprises
Quiz Time	2011	Disney Junior France	co-production with Studio Redfrog
Chicken Town	2011	Canal+ Family & OCS	co-production with 1st Day Studios and Araneo; Based on the short of the same name by Klasky Csupo
Linkers: Secret Codes	2014–2015	Canal J & Gulli; Rai Gulp (Italy)	Originally titled Cross Worlds; co-production with Les Cartooneurs Associés, Enanimation, Rai Fiction and World Dong Man Company
Kinky and Cosy	2014	OCS	co-production with Belvision
Boule et Bill	2016–2018	France 3/Piwi+ RTBF (Belgium)	co-production with Dargaud Media and Belvision
The Fox/Badger Family	2018–2022	France 5	co-production with Dargaud Media and Philm CGI
Kid Lucky	2020	M6; Rai Gulp (Italy)	co-production with Dargaud Media, Belvision and Rai Ragazzi
The Smurfs	2021–present	TF1; La Trois & Ketnet (Belgium); Kika (Germany); Nickelodeon (International)	continued from Dargaud Media and Les Cartooneurs Associés from season 3 onwards co-production with Dupuis Edition & Audiovisuel and Peyo Productions
Living with Dad	2022–present	M6, Canal J & Gulli; La Trois (Belgium)	co-production with Dupuis Edition & Audiovisuel and Belvision; Based on the comic book series Dad by Nob
Belfort & Lupin	2025–present	France 4; Auvio Kids TV & Ketnet (Belgium); Radio-Canada (Canada); SWR (Germany)	co-production with Dargaud Media, Belvision and Mediatoon Distribution
Trotro and Zaza	2025–present	France 5; Rai Yoyo (Italy)	co-production with Dupuis Edition & Audiovisuel, Studio Campedelli, Mediatoon Distribution and Rai Kids

=== Films and specials ===
Title	Release date	Distributor	Notes
Babar: The Movie	July 28, 1989	Fourm Distribution; Astral Films (Canada); New Line Cinema (United States)	co-production with Nelvana and The Clifford Ross Company
Becassine and the Viking Treasure	December 12, 2001	Gebaka Films	co-production with Home Made Movies and Image Film
Akissi	June 14, 2022	France 4	co-production with Les Cartooneurs Associés and GHWA Productions
Toy Story 5	June 19, 2026	Walt Disney Studios Motion Pictures (United States)	co-production with Walt Disney Pictures, Pixar and Araneo

== Films, TV shows, and specials ==
- Alta Donna
- Sullivan (a.k.a. Clorophylle)
- The Garfield Show
- Wonder Wai
