= Belvision Studios =

Belgian film studio

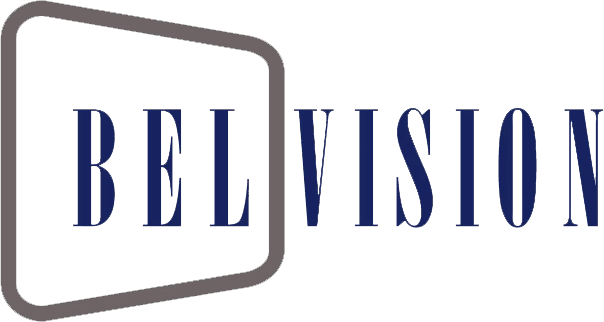
- Type: Subsidiary
- Industry: Animation
- Founded: 1954; 72 years ago
- Headquarters: Brussels, Belgium
- Products: Television programs and movies
- Parent: Raymond Leblanc (1954–1986); Dupuis (1986–)
- Website: www.belvision.be

Belvision Studios, also known as Belvision, is a Belgian audiovisual production company and animation studio founded in 1954 by Raymond Leblanc, who also founded publishing company Le Lombard. Belvision is currently owned by Média-Participations through its Belgian publishing company Dupuis. Although the studio is best known for producing animated films and animated television series based on Franco-Belgian comics series such as Tintin, Asterix and Lucky Luke, they also develop live-action film and television series productions.

== History ==
In the late 1970s, Belvision ceased production of feature animated films order to focus on producing commercials and pilots for its television series.

In 1986, Belgian publishing house Dupuis (former rival of Lablanc's French publishing house Le Lombard) acquired Belvision and restructured the company as Dupuis' new animation production studio.

In June 2004, French media publishing and entertainment company Média-Participations announced their purchase of Éditions Dupuis. Média-Participations also owns French publishing house Dargaud and Dupuis's former rival publisher Le Lombard.

== Selected works created and produced by Belvision ==
=== Animated TV series ===
Title	Years	Network	Notes
Journey to the Heart of the World	1993–94	Canal+ (France)	co-production with Dargaud Films and Saban International Paris
Kitou, the Six Eyed Monster	2002	TF1 (France); Vrak TV (Canada)	co-production with Dargaud Marina and Tooncan Productions
Yakari	2005–17	La Deux/La Une; France 3 (France); WDR (Germany)	co-production with Storimages, Ellipsanime Productions (seasons 3–5), Les Cartooneurs Associés (season 4), Dargaud Media (season 5), ARD (seasons 3–5) and 2 Minutes
Kinky and Cosy	2014	OCS (France)	co-production with Ellipsanime Productions
Boule et Bill	2016–19	France 3 & Piwi+	co-production with Dargaud Media and Ellipsanime Productions
Little Furry	2017–21	La Trois & Ketnet; Piwi+ (France)	co-production with Dupuis Edition & Audiovisuel and Dargaud Media
Abraca	2019	France 3	co-production with Ankama, Planet Nemo Animation and Pictanovo
Kid Lucky	2020	M6; Rai Gulp (Italy)	co-production with Dargaud Media, Ellipsanime Productions and Rai Ragazzi
Living with Dad	2022–present	La Trois; M6, Canal J & Gulli (France)	co-production with Dupuis Edition & Audiovisuel and Ellipsanime Productions; Based on the comic book series Dad by Nob
The Fox/Badger Family	2022	France 5	co-production with Ellipsanime Productions, Dargaud Media and Philm CGI (season 1)
Monster Loving Maniacs	2023–present	Ketnet; Nickelodeon Italy (Italy); Super RTL (Germany); DR (Denmark); SVT (Sweden); NRK (Norway)	co-production with Toon2Tango, Mondo TV, Ja Film and Ginger Pictures
Chimera Keepers: Adventures with Incredible Creatures	2024–present	La Trois & Ketnet; France 4 (France)	co-production with Monello Productions
Belfort & Lupin	2025–present	Auvio Kids TV & Ketnet; France 4 (France); Radio-Canada (Canada); SWR (Germany)	co-production with Ellipsanime Productions and Dargaud Media
Ki & Hi in the Panda Kingdom	2025–present	Auvio Kids TV; Canal+ Kids (France)	co-production with Method Animation and Drawsome Studio
The Marsupilamis	2025–present	Auvio Kids TV & Ketnet; Gulli (France); Nickelodeon (International); Radio-Canada (Canada)	co-production with Dupuis Edition & Audiovisuel and Dargaud Media
Montclair & The Mechanical Mysteries	Spring 2026	France 4	co-production with Ankama and Pictanovo
Louca	2026	RTBF; TF1 (France)	co-production with Studio 100 International and Media Valley

- Chlorophylle (1954)
- Suske en Wiske (1955)
- Hergé's Adventures of Tintin (1957–1964)

=== Films ===
Title	Release date	Distributor	Notes
Asterix the Gaul	December 20, 1967; December 23, 1967 (Belgium)	Athos Films	co-production with Dargaud Films
Asterix and Cleopatra	December 19, 1968; December 21, 1968 (Belgium)	Pathé	co-production with Dargaud Films and Edifilm
Daisy Town	December 20, 1971	Les Artistes Associés	Based on the comics Lucky Luke co-production with Dargaud Films
Tintin and the Lake of Sharks	December 13, 1972	Les Artistes Associés	
The Smurfs and the Magic Flute	December 24, 1975	Mercury Films	co-production with Editions Dupuis, Lafig S.A and IMPS
The Red Turtle	June 29, 2016; September 17, 2016 (Japan)	Wild Bunch; Toho (Japan)	co-production with Studio Ghibli, Wild Bunch, Prima Linea Productions, Why Not Productions, Arte France Cinéma and CN4 Productions
Zombillenium	October 18, 2017	Gebaka Films	co-production with Dupuis Edition & Audiovisuel, Maybe Movies and 2 Minutes
Gaston Lagaffe	April 4, 2018	UGC Distribution	co-production with Les Films du Premier, Les Films du 24, UGC Images and TF1 Films Production
Vic the Viking and the Magic Sword	18 December 2019 (France); 2 September 2021 (Germany)	SND Films; Leonine Distribution (Germany)	co-production with Studio 100 Animation, Studio 100 Film, Studio 100 Media, SND Films and ZDF
Yakari, A Spectacular Journey	August 12, 2020	BAC Films; Leonine Distribution (Germany)	co-production with Dargaud Media, Dupuis Edition & Audiovisuel, Le Lombard, BAC Films Production, Leonine Production, WunderWerk, Gao Shang Pictures, WDR and France 3 Cinema
The Treasure of Barracuda	September 26, 2025	Filmax	co-production with Inicia Films, Hampa Studio and El Tesoro de Barracuda AIE
Yakari: Brave Heart	2027	TBA	co-production with Ellipse Animation
Lucky Luke in Welcome to Fanga Town	2029	TBA	co-production with Ellipse Animation and Pan Animation

- Pinocchio in Outer Space (1965)
- Tintin and the Temple of the Sun (1969)
- I, Tintin (1975) – documentary
- Gulliver's Travels (1977)
- Asterix: Mansions of the Gods (2014)

Animated shorts

- Cubitus (1977)
- Clifton (1984)
- Oumpah-pah
- Spaghetti à la Romaine
