= Trotro =

French animated television series

- Created by: Benedicte Guettier
- Country of origin: France
- Original language: French
- No. of seasons: 2
- No. of episodes: 78

Production
- Running time: 3 minutes
- Production companies: Storimages; 2 Minutes

Original release
- Network: France 5
- Release: October 23, 2004 – December 31, 2005

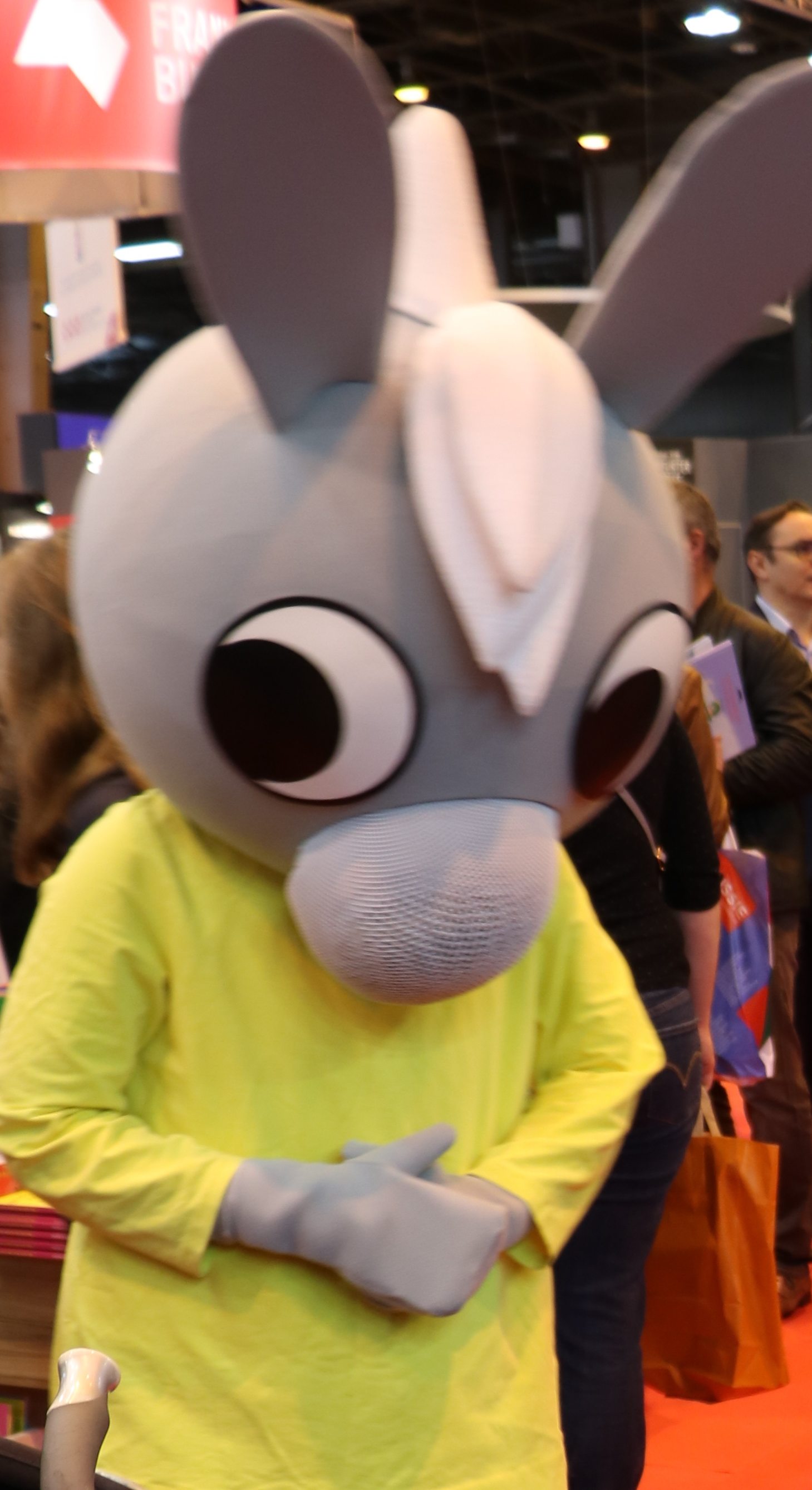
Person dressed as Trotro, the titular character

Trotro is a French children's animated television series. It is about a young donkey named Trotro. The show is based on the books of Bénédicte Guettier and it's produced in a series of 78 episodes of 3 minutes each. A spin-off, titled Trotro & Zaza is in development.

== Voice cast ==
- Joanna Ruiz as Trotro, Lily, Zoe, Trotro's Mom
- Andy Turvey as Trotro's Dad
- Julie Ann Dean as Additional voices

== Plot ==
The series centers on Trotro, a young donkey with an imaginative and determined personality. Episodes follow his daily routines, play, and interactions with friends and family.

== Series overview ==
Season	Episodes	Originally released		
Season	Episodes	First released	Last released	Network
1	39	October 23, 2004	December 18, 2004	France 5
2	39	April 16, 2005	December 31, 2005	France 5

== Episodes ==
=== Season 1 ===
No. in season	Title	Written by	Original release date	Prod. code
1	"Trotro Plays Hide and Seek"	Antonin Poiree	October 23, 2004	101
Trotro is playing hide and seek with Lili. It's always really difficult to hide when you have ears like Trotro's and so Lili always wins. But when it comes to playing tag, Trotro is the fastest.
2	"Trotro Has a Nice Satchel"	Mathilde Maraninchi	October 25, 2004	102
Trotro won't take his satchel off any more, not even for playing in the garden with Lili and Zoe. But this isn't practical. He can't do any skipping, his sand castle has got knocked over and he can't climb up the steps on the slide. When he plays kiss chase, Trotro can't catch the girls. So upon reflection, there's only one thing to do. When playing, it's better to take the satchel off.
3	"Trotro the Little Monster"	Antonin Poiree	October 26, 2004	103
Trotro has decided to be a little monster. He successfully tries out his new talent on his parents but then this new little monster suddenly gets frightened by a tiny little animal!
4	"Trotro Can Read"	Marie - Luz Drouet	October 27, 2004	104
Trotro is reading a book to Teddy. It's as if Trotro is actually reading it because even though he does not know how to read the words, he knows the story off by heart. Teddy never ever gets bored when Trotro tells him a story, but when Mummy reads one, Teddy always falls asleep……
5	"Trotro Goes Shopping"	Marie - Luz Drouet	October 28, 2004	105
Trotro loves pushing his own trolley around the shop and choosing all the things that are needed in the house. Daddy's mind is on other things and so he really isn't paying much attention. But when Daddy and Trotro get to the check out…. Daddy isn't too happy with some of the things Trotro has put in the trolley….
6	"Trotro the Musician"	Max Mamoud	October 29, 2004	106
Trotro wants to become a musician. He plays the accordion, blows in a trumpet….. In the kitchen he turns a saucepan into a drum…. Bang bang bang!! He proudly marches around playing in front of Mummy.
7	"Trotro and the Rain"	Marie - Luz Drouet	October 30, 2004	107
As soon as it stops raining, Trotro and Teddy go out for a walk. They jump in all the puddles and slide and splash around everywhere. You can just imagine!! They end up just as wet as if they had gone out in the rain in the first place!
8	"Trotro Plays in Bed"	Pascal Stervinou	November 1, 2004	108
Trotro does not want to get up this morning. He would rather play, or make a big top for a circus, or imagine he is sailing along on a raft. Mummy calling him has no effect. Only Lili and Zoe manage to get him out of bed.
9	"Trotro's in Love"	Marie - Luz Drouet	November 2, 2004	109
Trotro is in love with Zoe, but she doesn't want to play with him!
10	"Trotro Makes Some Soup"	Sabastien Dejardin	November 3, 2004	110
Trotro is having a tea party with Teddy. To make some soup, he needs some grass, some pebbles and some water. Trotro stirs all the ingredients and asks his parents to taste it. But Mummy's soup still tastes better.
11	"Trotro Tidies his Room"	Mathilde Maraninchi	November 4, 2004	111
Mummy asks Trotro to tidy away the toys that are lying all over the floor in his bedroom. But Trotro decides to undertake a major tidy up operation of everything and starts by taking everything out of his bookcase, his box of drawings and his toy box. Instead of finding a tidy room, Mummy comes across an absolute mess…..
12	"Trotro Washes Teddy"	Marie - Luz Drouet	November 5, 2004	112
Trotro has knocked his chocolate over Teddy. To wash him, Mummy puts Teddy in the washing machine. But it's not so easy to dry Teddy afterwards. But Trotro's efforts are all worth it in the end – there is nothing as good as sleeping with a nice clean Teddy.
13	"Trotro and the Fish"	Antonin Poiree	November 6, 2004	113
Trotro does not want to eat his fish, and so has to find a way of getting out of this. He has more than a trick or two up his sleeve, much to the admiration of Lili and Zoe.
14	"Trotro and the Hedgehog"	Pascal Stervinou	November 8, 2004	114
Trotro and Lili have found a little hedgehog in the garden. But it's impossible to see his face as he is all curled up in a ball. So Trotro and Lili offer him something to eat. Just the trick !! The little hedgehog shows his face. But how can they stroke him without hurting their hands on his prickles….?
15	"Trotro Won't Share"	Mathilde Maraninchi	November 9, 2004	115
Trotro is drawing in his room, and Lili is with him. He doesn't want her to touch any of his pencils or any of his toys. Every time Trotro finishes with something, he won't share it with Lili. So Lili come back with her own roller skates, and is really enjoying herself…. Now Trotro would really love to share …..
16	TBA	TBD	2004	TBA
17	TBA	TBD	2004	TBA
18	TBA	TBD	2004	TBA
19	TBA	TBD	2004	TBA
20	TBA	TBD	2004	TBA
21	TBA	TBD	2004	TBA
22	TBA	TBD	2004	TBA
23	TBA	TBD	2004	TBA
24	TBA	TBD	2004	TBA
25	TBA	TBD	2004	TBA
26	TBA	TBD	2004	TBA
27	TBA	TBD	2004	TBA
28	TBA	TBD	2004	TBA
29	TBA	TBD	2004	TBA
30	TBA	TBD	2004	TBA
31	TBA	TBD	2004	TBA
32	TBA	TBD	2004	TBA
33	TBA	TBD	2004	TBA
34	TBA	TBD	2004	TBA
35	TBA	TBD	2004	TBA
36	TBA	TBD	2004	TBA
37	TBA	TBD	2004	TBA
38	TBA	TBD	2004	TBA
39	TBA	Unknown	December 18, 2004	TBA

=== Season 2 ===
No. in season	Title	Original release date
1	"Trotro the Judo Champion"	April 16, 2005
2	"Trotro and the Lucky Sack"	TBA
3	"Trotro and the Tortoise"	TBA
4	"Trotro Learns to Dance"	TBA
5	"Trotro is in a Bad Mood"	TBA
6	"Trotro Gets Zoe a Birthday Present"	TBA
7	"Trotro and the Kite"	TBA
8	"Not Now, Trotro"	TBA
9	"Trotro's Den"	TBA
10	"Trotro and his Orchestra"	TBA
11	"Trotro and the Whistle"	TBA
12	"Trotro and the Box of Tricks"	TBA
13	"When Trotro Grows Up"	TBA
14	"Trotro, Be Quiet"	TBA
15	"Trotro is a Baby"	TBA
16	"Trotro Can Do Everything by Himself"	TBA
17	"Trotro Goes Painting"	TBA
18	"Trotro Plays with his Feet"	TBA
19	"Trotro Wants a Sweet"	TBA
20	"Trotro Goes on Holidays"	TBA
21	"Trotro and the Bird"	TBA
22	"Trotro the Little Gardener"	TBA
23	"Trotro and the Vegetable Garden"	TBA
24	"Trotro's Bath"	TBA
25	"Trotro and the Nest"	TBA
26	"Trotro is Kind"	TBA
27	"Trotro and the Sand Castle"	TBA
28	"Trotro is All Grown Up"	TBA
29	"Trotro's House"	TBA
30	"Trotro and the Treasure Hunt"	TBA
31	"Trotro and the Market"	TBA
32	"Trotro and the Fishing Line"	TBA
33	"Trotro and the Scooter"	TBA
34	"Trotro the Copy Cat"	TBA
35	"Trotro's Zoo"	TBA
36	"Trotro and the Bubbles"	TBA
37	"Trotro and the Christmas Presents"	TBA
38	"Trotro and the Bouquet"	TBA
39	"Trotro and the Race"	December 31, 2005

== Production ==
Trotro was announced in September 2003, when Dargaud Marina's subsidiary Storimages partnered with 2 Minutes to develop and adapt Bénédicte Guettier book series into a television series of the same name with the latter studio would provide animation for the series while Dargaud Marina's distribution unit Dargaud Distribution handling distribution to the series.
