= Inami =

Inami can refer to:

== Places ==
- Inami, Hyōgo, Japan
- Inami, Toyama, Japan
- Inami, Wakayama, Japan

== People with the surname ==
- Anju Inami (伊波 杏樹, born 1996), Japanese voice actress

== Other uses ==
- Inami, one of the Celestial Warriors of Genbu in Fushigi Yūgi Genbu Kaiden
- Inami (TV series), a 2007 French animated cartoon series about ecological issues in Amazonia
- Institut national d'assurance maladie invalidité (INAMI), federal public body of social security in Belgium.
- The National Institute of Migration (Mexico) (acronym for Instituto Nacional de Migración), the government entity in Mexico that controls and supervises migration
