= List of science fiction television programs, X =

This is an inclusive list of science fiction television programs whose names begin with the letter X.

== X ==
Live-action

- X-Files, The (franchise) (elements of science fiction in some episodes):
  - X-Files, The (1993–2002, 2016-2018)
  - Lone Gunmen, The (2001, X-Files, The spin-off)
- Xcalibur (2001)

Animation

- X-Bomber (1980–1981, Japan, puppet animation)
- X-Men (franchise):
  - X-Men: Pryde of the X-Men (1989, animated, pilot)
  - X-Men aka X-Men: The Animated Series (1992–1997, animated)
  - X-Men: Evolution (2000–2003, animated)
  - Wolverine and the X-Men (2008–2009, animated)
  - Marvel Anime: Wolverine (2011, Japan, animated)
  - Marvel Anime: X-Men (2011, Japan, animated)
- Xenosaga: The Animation (2005, Japan, animated)
- The X's (2005, animated)
- Xyber 9: New Dawn (1999, animated)
