= Belfort & Lupin =

French animated television series

- Genre: Adventure; Comedy-drama
- Created by: Teddy J. Stehly
- Developed by: Teddy J. Stehly
- Written by: Florence Marchal
- Directed by: Philippe Vidal
- Creative director: Justine Cunha
- Voices of: Alexandre Nguyen; Hugo Brunswick; Barbara Tissier; Emmanuel Rausenberger; Antoine Schoumsky; Nathalie Homs; Magaly Rosenzweig; Guillaume Beaujolais
- Composer: Thibault Kientz Agyeman
- Country of origin: France
- Original language: French
- No. of seasons: 1
- No. of episodes: 26

Production
- Executive producers: Caroline Duvochel; Caroline Audebert; Raphaële Ingberg
- Running time: 22 minutes
- Production companies: Ellipsanime Productions; Dargaud Media; Belvision Studios

Original release
- Network: France 4 Okoo
- Release: February 7 – May 16, 2025

Belfort & Lupin is a French animated television series created by Teddy J. Stehly and directed by Philippe Vidal. The series follows the adventures of Belfort, a refined spaniel, and Lupin, an intrepid wolf, who form an unlikely duo in the Palace of Versailles during the reign of Louis XIV. The show premiered on February 7, 2025 on Okoo and February 10, 2025 on France 4.

== Synopsis ==
The series takes place in the 17th century in the Palace of Versailles. It focuses on Belfort, an intelligent and elegant spaniel who is favored by the Sun King (Louis XIV), and Lupin, a wild but generous wolf, living in the gardens of the castle. Together, they solve mysteries involving the other animals of the royal estate while navigating between court intrigue and humorous adventures.

Each episode offers an independent plot while also developing an overall narrative framework around the relationships between the characters and the secrets hidden in the gardens of Versailles.

== Cast and characters ==
- Alexandre Nguyen as Belfort, a loyal Brittany Spaniel. He is often tasked with investigating strange events at the palace.
- Hugo Brunswick as Lupin, a brave gray wolf. He inhabits the gardens of Versailles and helps Belfort solve mysteries while remaining discreet towards the humans.
- Barbara Tissier as Ariane, an elegant and clever Siamese cat who helps Belfort and Lupin with their investigations.
- Guillaume Beaujolais as Louis XIV, the monarch reigning over Versailles
- Emmanuel Rausenberger as Bontemps
- Antoine Schoumsky as Bazire, the royal dog valet
- Magali Rosenzweig as Ponne, one of Belfort's sisters, and Madame Rosa, an elephant living in the king's managerie
- Barbara Tissier as Tane, one of Belfort's sisters
- Nathalie Homs as Diane, Belfort's mother

== Production ==
The show is produced by Ellipse Animation and Belvision Studios in collaboration with France Télévisions. Development on the show began in June 2019 during the 2019 Cartoon Fourm lineup, when Ellipsanime Productions had announced a new traditionally/CGI-animated TV series entitled Belfort & Lupin with Teddy J Stehly would serve as creator for the upcoming series.

This is the final show that Philippe Vidal had contributed to before his death on September 7, 2025.

=== Animation ===
The animation production services for Belfort & Lupin was being handled at Ellipse Animation's Paris-based animation studio Ellipse Studio, its Angoulême-based production division Ellipse Studio Angoulême and Belgian animation studio DreamWall, alongside Ellipse Animation's Italian animation production subsidiary Studio Campedelli which Ellipse Animation had brought it in January 2024.

== Episodes ==
| No. | Title | Written by | Storyboarded by | Okoo release date | France 4 air date | Prod. code |
|---|---|---|---|---|---|---|
| 1 | "The Wig House" | Teddy J. Stehly | Teresa Guarnido | February 7, 2025 | February 10, 2025 | 108 |
| 2 | "The Cat Did It" | Cyril Deydier & Baptiste Grosfiley | José Luis Marco | February 7, 2025 | February 11, 2025 | 107 |
| 3 | "The Swan's Ballet" | Teddy J. Stehly | José Luis Marco | February 7, 2025 | February 12, 2025 | 115 |
| 4 | "Elite Dog" | Cyril Deydier & Baptiste Grosfiley | Miguel De Lalor | February 7, 2025 | February 13, 2025 | 105 |
| 5 | "The Garden Maze" | Catherine Billimof & Anne Ducruet | Philippe Vidal | February 7, 2025 | February 14, 2025 | 103 |
| 6 | "The Dance Recital" | Teddy J. Stehly | Sophie Moulin | February 7, 2025 | February 17, 2025 | 126 |
| 7 | "Swans in Distress" | Fabienne Gambrelle | Teresa Guarnido | February 7, 2025 | February 18, 2025 | 113 |
| 8 | "The King's Peas" | Catherine Billimof & Anne Ducruet | Sophie Moulin | February 7, 2025 | February 19, 2025 | 119 |
| 9 | "Family Portrait" | Catherine Billimof & Anne Ducruet | Philippe Vidal | February 7, 2025 | February 20, 2025 | 102 |
| 10 | "The Gardens of Versailles" | Catherine Billimof & Anne Ducruet | Juliette Rebollo | February 7, 2025 | February 21, 2025 | 109 |
| 11 | "Fly Flamingo Fly" | Cyril Deydier & Baptiste Grosfiley | Mélanie Lopez | February 7, 2025 | February 24, 2025 | 111 |
| 12 | "Lupin Against the Clock" | Cyril Deydier & Baptiste Grosfiley | François Dufour | February 7, 2025 | February 25, 2025 | 118 |
| 13 | "Major Dischord" | Catherine Billimof & Anne Ducruet | Alix Adam | February 7, 2025 | February 26, 2025 | 125 |
| 14 | "Ruckus at the Menagerie" | Catherine Billimof & Anne Ducruet | Miguel De Lalor | February 26, 2025 | February 27, 2025 | 112 |
| 15 | "Sick as a Dog" | Teddy J. Stehly | François Dufour | February 26, 2025 | February 28, 2025 | 110 |
| 16 | "The Royal Horse Show" | Cyril Deydier & Baptiste Grosfiley | Philippe Vidal | February 26, 2025 | March 3, 2025 | 106 |
| 17 | "Marmot on Ice" | Teddy J. Stehly | Philippe Vidal | February 26, 2025 | March 4, 2025 | 101 |
| 18 | "Billiards on the Move" | Cyril Deydier & Baptiste Grosfiley | Juliette Rebollo | February 26, 2025 | March 5, 2025 | 124 |
| 19 | "Madam Rosa Turns 100" | Fabienne Gambrelle | Diego Zamora | May 16, 2025 | June 9, 2025 | 114 |
| 20 | "Ostriches on the Run" | Sébastien Oursel, Guillaume Mautalent & Teddy J. Stehly | Marc Perret | May 16, 2025 | June 6, 2025 | 104 |
| 21 | "Fire Quirks" | Hadrien Krasker & Mathieu Bouckenhove | Diego Zamora | May 16, 2025 | June 10, 2025 | 121 |
| 22 | "A Flea in the Ear" | Catherine Billimof & Anne Ducruet | Aimée Moreau | May 16, 2025 | June 11, 2025 | 117 |
| 23 | "An Important Visit" | Teddy J. Stehly | José Luis Marco | May 16, 2025 | June 12, 2025 | 120 |
| 24 | "The Other Belfort" | Fabienne Gambrelle | Teresa Guarnido | May 16, 2025 | June 13, 2025 | 116 |
| 25 | "Very Important Lion" | Hadrien Krasker, Mathieu Bouckenhove & Teddy J. Stehly | Gaëlle Rouby | May 16, 2025 | June 16, 2025 | 123 |
| 26 | "The Big Bad Wolf" | Teddy J. Stehly | Miguel De Lalor | May 16, 2025 | June 17, 2025 | 122 |
