= Dargaud Media =

French production company

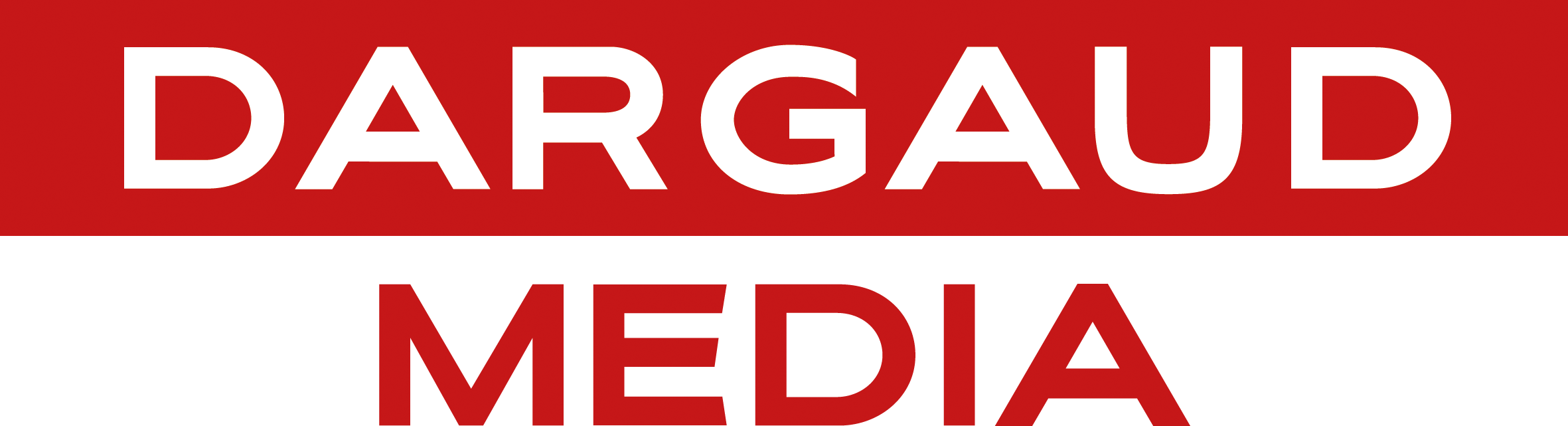
- Formerly: Dargaud Films (1984–1999); Dargaud Marina (1999–2008)
- Type: Subsidiary
- Industry: Animation
- Predecessor: Marina Productions (1990–1999); Millésime Productions (1993–1999)
- Founded: March 2, 1984; 42 years ago
- Headquarters: France
- Products: Television series
- Parent: Dargaud (1984–2022); Ellipse Animation (2022–present)

Dargaud Media is a French production company and animation studio that produces animation, documentaries and feature-length films. It was created in 1984 by the French-Belgian comic book publishing house Dargaud. It is one of the production labels of Ellipse Animation of the Média-Participations group.

== History ==
In 1967, Dargaud entered the animation production services with the movie Asterix the Gaul. Subsequently, the company produced or co-produced several Asterix, Lucky Luke and Tintin feature films.

By 1972, Dargaud announced that they teamed up with American production and distributor United Artists to produce the movie Le Viager which was directed by Pierre Tchernia. Two years later in 1974, Dargaud announced that they had joined forces with René Goscinny and Albert Uderzo.

In June 1997, Dargaud (alongside its parent Média-Participations) announced that they acquired French animation and production company Marina Productions, which was founded by Claude Berthier, expanding Dargaud's animation output and Média-Participations' production activities with Marina Productions being placed under Dargaud's film & television production division Dargaud Films, thus becoming Dargaud's own animation subsidiary within Dargaud Films. One year later in June 1998, following Dargaud's acquisition of Marina Productions, Dargaud expanded their animation and production operations by acquiring a majority interest in French production company Millésime Productions (which was headed by Gaspard de Chavagnac), with Dargaud combining Marina and Millésime's functions into one group, with Gaspard de Chavagnac heading Dargaud's two production companies. The following year at the start of 1999, Dargaud Film announced that they had merged their own animation production companies Marina Productions and Millésime Productions into one animation production division entity named Dargaud Marina, with the merged group handling their projects annually.

In May 2000, Dargaud Marina had established its documentary division to produce documentaries with former director of programming at TF1's documentary-turned lifestyke channel Stylia fka Odyssee Channel, Andre Annosse, serving as head of the newly established documentary arm as it announced two documentaries the following year in late-July 2001, which was

In July 2003, three years after Dargaud merged their animation and drama production outputs, Dargaud Marina expanded their animation production activities by their parent company Dargaud (along with their owner Média-Participations), as their parent company had acquired French animation production studio Ellipsanime from Canal+ and owned production outfit StudioExpand, thrus giving Dargaud another production animation studio and assuming all ownership of Ellipsanime's production activities, with Ellipsanime's animated production portfolio joining Dargaud's own production portfolio as Ellipsanime became a subsidiary of Dargaud Marina, marking Dargaud Marina becoming the largest animation production division of France.

On January 31, 2007, Dargaud Marina's parent company Dargaud announced that they rebranded their international distribution division Dargaud Distribution to Mediatoon Distribution following Media Participations's launch of Mediatoon.

In April 2008, Dargaud Marina announced they had partnered with Jim Davis' animation & licensing company behind the rights of Garfield franchise, Paws, Inc., to produce a CGI-animated series to celebrate the comic strip's 30th anniversary entitled The Garfield Show, which Dargaud Marina would produce & handle animation services for in-house while Paws Inc. would co-produce the then-upcoming series with Dargaud Marina.

In late-December 2008, Dargaud Media's international distributor Mediatoon, under their interactive division Mediatoon Interactive, announced the launch of an online channel that brought all of Dargaud Media's productions, including Ellipsanime's programs, under one brand named eToon to bring all of Mediatoon's programs on VOD and SVOD platforms.

On January 7, 2015, Dargaud Media, alongside its parent Dargaud, set up an new in-house animation production studio based in Angoulême that would handle animation services for all productions from Dargaud's animation production group, mainly from Dargaud's animation division Dargaud Media and its subsidiary Ellipsanime Productions, entitled Ellipse Studio.

In June 2022, during the Annecy International Animation Film Festival, Dargaud Media, alongside their parent company Dargaud and its owner Média-Participations, announced that they were bringing their French animation production labels (which were Dargaud Media, Dupuis Edition & Audiovisuel, Ellipsanime Productions, Roubaix-based joint venture animation studio Madlab Animations) and Paris & Angoulême-based in-house animation production studio Ellipse Studio) under one umbrella group named Ellipse Animation, with Dargaud Media being placed under Ellipse Animation as their production label.

== Filmography ==
=== TV series ===
| Title | Years | Network | Notes |
|---|---|---|---|
| Lucky Luke | 1991–1992 | France 3 | co-production with IDDH |
| Journey to the Heart of the World | 1993–1994 | Canal+ | co-production with Belvision and Saban International Paris |
| Bamboo Bears | 1995 | TF1; NPO 1 (Netherlands); Kids Station (Japan); ZDF (Germany); TVE2 (Spain) | under Marina Productions co-production with Telescreen, Mitsui & Co., ZDF Enterprises and Kingma Productions; Owned by Studio 100 International |
| Mr. Men and Little Miss | 1995–1997 | France 3 ITV (United Kingdom) | under Marina Productions co-production with Flicks Films and Mr. Films; Based on the books Mr. Men by Roger Hargreaves |
| Blake and Mortimer | 1997 | Canal+ | co-production with Ellipse Animation and Cactus Animation |
| The Princess of the Nile | 1999 | France 2 | |
| The New Adventures of Lucky Luke | 2001–2003 | France 3 Tele-Quebec (Canada) | co-production with Xilam Animation, Tooncan Productions and Lucky Comics |
| Lost World of Sir Arthur Conan Doyle | 2002 | Télétoon | co-production with Neuroplanet and Vivatoon |
| Kitou, The Six Eyed Monster | 2002–2003 | TF1; Vrak TV (Canada) | co-production with Belvision and Tooncan Productions |
| Jacques Cousteau's Ocean Tales | 2003 | France 3 YTV & Tele-Quebec (Canada) | co-production with Vivatoon |
| Boule et Bill | 2005 | TF1 & Télétoon | co-production with Tooncan Productions and Bell Ombre Films |
| Yakari | 2005–2017 | France 3; La Deux/La Une (Belgian); Kika (Germany) | Took over co-production from Les Cartooneurs Associés for season 5; co-production with Storimages, Belvision, Ellipsanime Productions (seasons 3–5), (season 4), ARD & WDR (seasons 3–5) and 2 Minutes |
| Rintindumb | 2006–2007 | France 3 | co-production with Xilam Animation and Lucky Comics |
| Time Jam: Valerian & Laureline | 2007–2008 | France 3 | co-production with EuropaCorp and Satelight |
| The Garfield Show | 2008–2015 | France 3 Cartoon Network/Boomerang (United States) | co-production with Paws, Inc. Based on the comic strip series Garfield by Jim Davis |
| The Daltons | 2010–2016 | France 3 | co-production with Xilam Animation, Lucky Comics and B Media Kids |
| Boule et Bill | 2016–2019 | France 3 & Piwi+ | co-production with Ellipsanime Productions (season 1), Dupuis Edition & Audiovisuel (season 2) and Belvision |
| Little Furry | 2017–2021 | Piwi+ La Trois & Ketnet (Belgium) | co-production with Dupuis Edition & Audiovisuel and Belvision |
| The Fox/Badger Family | 2018–2022 | France 5 | co-production with Ellipsanime Productions and Philm CGI |
| Garfield Originals | 2019–2020 | France 3 Nick.com (United States) | co-production with Paws, Inc. |
| Kid Lucky | 2020 | M6; Rai Gulp | co-production with Ellipsanime Productions, Belvision and Rai Ragazzi |
| The Smurfs | 2021–2022 | TF1; La Trois & Ketnet (Belgium); Kika (Germany); Nickelodeon (International) | season 1 only co-production with Dupuis Edition & Audiovisuel and Peyo Productions |
| Belfort & Lupin | 2025 | France 4 Auvio Kids TV & Ketnet (Belgium); Radio-Canada (Canada); SWR (Germany) | co-production with Ellipsanime Productions, Belvision and Mediatoon Distribution |
| The Marsupilamis | 2025–present | Gulli; La Trois & Ketnet (Belgium); Radio-Canada (Canada); Nickelodeon (International) | co-production with Dupuis Edition & Audiovisuel, Belvision and Mediatoon Distribution |

=== Films ===
| Title | Release date | Distributor | Notes |
|---|---|---|---|
| Asterix the Gaul | December 20, 1967; December 23, 1967 (Belgium) | Athos Films | co-production with Belvision |
| Asterix and Cleopatra | December 19, 1968; December 21, 1968 (Belgium) | Pathé | co-production with Belvision and Edifilm |
| Daisy Town | December 20, 1971 | Les Artistes Associés | Based on the comics Lucky Luke co-production with Belvision |
| Tintin and the Lake of Sharks | December 13, 1972 | Les Artistes Associés | co-production with Belvision |
| Go West! A Lucky Luke Adventure | December 5, 2007 | Pathé Distribution; Alliance Vivafilm (Canada) | co-production with Xilam Animation, France 3 Cinema and Lucky Comics |
| Tricky Old Dogs | August 22, 2018 | Gaumont | Live-action film co-production with Radar Films, France 3 Cinema, Cinécap, Dargaud, Entourage Pictures and Egérie Productions |
| Yakari, A Spectacular Journey | August 12, 2020 | BAC Films (France); Leonine Distribution (Germany) | co-production with Dupuis Edition & Audiovisuel, Belvision, Le Lombard, BAC Film Production, Leonine Production, WunderWerk, Gao Shang Pictures, WDR and France 3 Cinema |

== See also ==
- Belvision
- Dargaud Marina
- Ellipsanime
