= Bouli =

French animated TV series

- Directed by: Denis Olivieri
- Country of origin: France
- Original language: French
- No. of seasons: 2
- No. of episodes: 114

Production
- Running time: 5 minutes (season 1) or 7 minutes (season 2), paired into half-hours of 23 minutes
- Production company: Les Cartooneurs Associés

Original release
- Network: Antenne 2
- Release: 1989 – 1991

Bouli is an animated television series originally produced in France from 1989 until 1991.

== Synopsis ==
The Moon magically brings Bouli the snowman and his snowman friends to life and keeps them from melting.

All the snowmen live in a picturesque village hidden in the woods. Bouli's main goal in life is to be good to others, to help them, to smile and to involve them in a variety of activities and adventures, including sea voyages, skiing, ice skating, cooking, playing music, etc.

Bouli and his friends include: the sailor, the footballer, the tennis player, the ice cream vendor, the cook, the punk, the lifeguard, the grandfather, and Bouli's two closest friends: Bouli girl whom he loves, and a big bear who sleeps, snores and eats cakes.

== Distribution ==
=== TV ===
The series originally aired in France between 1989 and 1990.

- In Ireland, it was first broadcast in Irish on The Den, a children's block on RTÉ's Network 2 channel, premiering on 2 September 1991; and was repeated on Irish-language-specific Telefís na Gaeilge's Cúlabula block in the late 1990s.
- In North Macedonia, it was broadcast in the early 1990s.
- In Israel, it was broadcast on Channel 1.
- In Brazil, it was broadcast on the TV Cultura channel.
- In New Zealand, it was broadcast on TV2.
- In Canada, it was broadcast on CBC Television as part of their Hodge Podge Lodge block from 1990–1994 and on Treehouse TV in 1997.
- In Russia, it was broadcast on Karusel.
- In Singapore, it was broadcast on Channel 5.
- In Australia, it was broadcast on ABC Australia from August 20, 1990 to July 19, 1994.
- In the United Kingdom, it was broadcast on the defunct largest children's cable network The Children's Channel.
- In Jordan, it was broadcast in its original French language on the French network of JRTV.
- In Saudi Arabia, it was broadcast on the country's English language network Saudi 2 with the English dub being screened.
- In Poland, it was broadcast on TVP1 in 1990–1992 and 2008–2009 and on TVP Polonia in 2009.
- In the Netherlands, it was broadcast in the 1991–1992 season at least.
- In Greece, it was broadcast on ERT1.

The show was also broadcast in several other countries.

=== Home media releases ===
Two collections of episodes from the Irish-language dub were released on VHS in Ireland via RTÉ; Bouli agus a Chairde (Bouli and Friends), in 1990, and Bouli Arís (Bouli Again) in 1991. Irish clothing company HairyBaby also created a licensed Bouli line of T-shirts and hoodies for adults, based on the Bouli agus a Chairde box art.

A French DVD box set of the series was produced in the 2000s. An English DVD release was never made.
