= Boule et Bill (2005 TV series) =

2005 French-Canadian cartoon TV series

- DVD cover
- Based on: Boule et Bill by Jean Roba
- Written by: Marine Locatelli, Didier Lejeune, Alain Vallejo
- Directed by: Francis Nielsen
- Composers: Laurent Cayol, François Monfeuga, Jacques Bastello, Olivier Lanneluc
- Countries of origin: France, Canada
- Original language: French
- No. of episodes: 104

Production
- Producers: Gaspard de Chavagnac, Paul Cadieux
- Running time: 7 minutes

Original release
- Network: TF1, Télétoon (France); Unis (Canada)
- Release: January 3, 2005

Boule et Bill is a French–Canadian animated television series based on the Belgian comic strip Boule et Bill by Jean Roba. Produced in 2004 by Dargaud Marina and Tooncan Productions with Bel Ombre Films, Télétoon, TF1 and TPS Jeunesse, it consists of 104 episodes of seven minutes and was directed by Francis Nielsen. It premiered on TF1 on 3 January 2005, in the network's TF! Jeunesse block, and aired on Télétoon from 31 December 2005. A DVD edition was released by Citel on 7 June 2005. It is based on the popular Belgian comic Boule et Bill. It has aired on the channel Unis since 2015. It is the second animated adaptation, the first airing in the year 1975 on the channel RTBF. There is also a third TV series produced in 2015 that has aired on France 3 since 2016.

It is distributed internationally by Dargaud Distribution, and copyrighted in 2004 by Dargaud-Marina and Bel Ombre Films and TéléTOON/TPS Jeunesse. It is a Tooncan XXIII Inc. production.

== Plot ==
The story focuses on a suburban family in Brussels in the 1960s.

== Characters ==
- Boule/Billy is the boy
- Bill/Buddy is his dog
- Pierre is his dad
- Carine is his mom
- Mouf is a friend of Boule/Billy
- Plum is a girlfriend of Boule/Billy

== Episodes ==
There are one hundred and four episodes.

No.	Title	Original air date (TF1)	Original air date (Unis)
1	"Au régime"	2004	TBA
2	"Quelle horreur !"	TBA	TBA
3	"Caroline a disparu"	TBA	TBA
4	"Bonne nuit"	TBA	TBA
5	"To Bill or not to Bill"	TBA	TBA
6	"Insu-portable"	TBA	TBA
7	"Boule ce héros"	TBA	TBA
8	"Un héros tranquille"	TBA	TBA
9	"Une vie de chien"	TBA	TBA
10	"Abandonné"	TBA	TBA
11	"Le rendez-vous"	TBA	TBA
12	"Le défi"	TBA	TBA
13	"Pas pour des prunes"	TBA	TBA
14	"Joyeux anniversaire"	TBA	TBA
15	"Bill superstar"	TBA	TBA
16	"Cache-cache moustache"	TBA	TBA
17	"Amour, gloire et Bill"	TBA	TBA
18	"Y’a un os"	TBA	TBA
19	"La punition"	TBA	TBA
20	"Tamabouli"	TBA	TBA
21	"Le cadeau"	TBA	TBA
22	"Baby-sitter"	TBA	TBA
23	"Le rival"	TBA	TBA
24	"Le chat de madame Stick"	TBA	TBA
25	"Quand madame Stick attaque"	TBA	TBA
26	"Musique maestro"	TBA	TBA
27	"Bill rigoal"	TBA	TBA
28	"Quelle patée !"	TBA	TBA
29	"Crocodeal"	TBA	TBA
30	"Premières neiges"	TBA	TBA
31	"Un sacré cirque"	TBA	TBA
32	"Et moi alors ?"	TBA	TBA
33	"Donnant-donnant"	TBA	TBA
34	"L’étrange monsieur Lafer"	TBA	TBA
35	"Le hangar merveilleux"	TBA	TBA
36	"À la rencontre des Bogols"	TBA	TBA
37	"Le racket"	TBA	TBA
38	"La nuit des masques"	TBA	TBA
39	"La chasse au trésor"	TBA	TBA
40	"Caroline veut voler"	TBA	TBA
41	"Au pas camarades"	TBA	TBA
42	"Folies passagères"	TBA	TBA
43	"Bill déménage"	TBA	TBA
44	"Le marathon"	TBA	TBA
45	"Un coupable idéal"	TBA	TBA
46	"Bill veut son os"	TBA	TBA
47	"Au bord de l’eau"	TBA	TBA
48	"Sauve qui peut"	TBA	TBA
49	"Bill surdoué"	TBA	TBA
50	"Incurables"	TBA	TBA
51	"La course à toutous"	TBA	TBA
52	"Frisbill"	TBA	TBA
53	"Beau cadeau"	TBA	TBA
54	"Hé bain !"	TBA	TBA
55	"Le secret de Lafer"	TBA	TBA
56	"SOS nid détresse"	TBA	3 March 2016
57	"Camping sauvage"	TBA	12 December 2015
58	"Les Tarties"	TBA	19 December 2015
59	"L’œuf de Caroline"	TBA	7 March 2016
60	"Le bras cassé"	TBA	TBA
61	"Un amour d’instituteur"	TBA	15 December 2015
62	"La grève"	TBA	16 December 2015
63	"Vitalis perd la boule"	TBA	17 December 2015
64	"Boule des bois"	TBA	18 December 2015
65	"Leçons de séduction"	TBA	22 December 2015
66	"La Saint-Valentin"	TBA	23 December 2015
67	"Bill à boa"	TBA	24 December 2015
68	"Un Noël extra"	TBA	25 December 2015
69	"Partie de chasse"	TBA	29 December 2015
70	"Quelle vie de poulet !"	TBA	30 December 2015
71	"Le correspondant"	TBA	31 December 2015
72	"Transmission de pensées"	TBA	1 January 2016
73	"Le nouvel élève"	TBA	TBA
74	"Du rififi chez les Robin"	TBA	TBA
75	"Loup y es-tu ?"	TBA	TBA
76	"Personne ne m’aime"	TBA	TBA
77	"Boule et Bill.com"	TBA	TBA
78	"Bill et boule de neige"	TBA	TBA
79	"Bijou !"	TBA	TBA
80	"Un éléphant dans la ville"	TBA	TBA
81	"Sauvons Pipeau"	TBA	TBA
82	"Invasion extraterrestre"	TBA	TBA
83	"Rien que pour Prune"	TBA	TBA
84	"Moment magique"	TBA	TBA
85	"Gentil toutou"	TBA	TBA
86	"Bill le pirate"	TBA	TBA
87	"Taupe-là"	TBA	TBA
88	"Pas de fumée sans Bill"	TBA	TBA
89	"Pour une poignée de croquettes"	TBA	TBA
90	"Somnanbill"	TBA	TBA
91	"Bill et Bull"	TBA	TBA
92	"Le petit chaperon Boule"	TBA	TBA
93	"Pas de bol pour Boule"	TBA	TBA
94	"Le pari"	TBA	TBA
95	"Pie voleuse"	TBA	TBA
96	"Tout un poème"	TBA	TBA
97	"Frères ennemis"	TBA	TBA
98	"Y’a de la magouille"	TBA	TBA
99	"Cadeau pour Reine"	TBA	TBA
100	"Quand Caro recontre Harry"	TBA	TBA
101	"Chasse à la souris"	TBA	TBA
102	"Boule est Bill"	TBA	TBA
103	"Jeux de rôles"	TBA	TBA
104	"Plein les yeux"	TBA	TBA

== Production ==
Development for the series was announced in August 2001, when Dupuis Audiovisuel, the production arm of Belgian comic publishing house Dupuis, had ordered a new animated series based on the Boule et Bill comic series with Dupuis Audiovisuel's distribution arm Dupuis Distribution set to distribute the series internationally. Three years later on June 25, 2004 during production on the upcoming adaptation, Dupuis Audiovisuel and its distributiom arm Dupuis Distribution alongside its comic publishing parent Dupuis had been brought by French media entertainment company Média-Participations who owned Dupuis' French publishing rival Dargaud with the latter's distribution unit Dargaud Distribution assumed the role of distribution when it absorbed the former's distribution division Dupuis Distribution. Two months later at the start of September of that year following the acquisition of Dupuis Audiovisuel and kts's parent Dupuis by Média-Participations, development of the series was moved to Dargaud's animation division Dargaud Marina when it partnered with Canadian animation studio Tooncan Productions to produce Boule & Bill, becoming a French/Canadian production with TF1 being served as commissioner & Gaspard de Chavagnac and Paul Cadieux would serve as producers for the upcoming adaptation.

It is co-produced by Patrick Dedieu. Administrative production by Judith Serfaty, assistant-produced by Ingrid Libercier and Jennifer Regent.

The series was written by Marine Locatelli, Didier Lejeune and Alain Vallejo, with Muriel Achery and Lejeune as heads of writing, character design by David Leuba, graphic design by Rémi Lasfargeas and artistic direction by Serge Cicerone. Animation was produced by Hong Guang Animation in Suzhou, China. François Sasseville directed the French-language dubbing, and the voice cast includes Laurent-Christophe de Ruelle, Hugolin Chevrette, Martin Watier, Aline Pinsonneault and Nathalie Coupal.

The graphics adaptation is done by Remi Lasfargeas of Acacia Studio - La Faktory. Also by Seahorse Productions, with artistic director responsible for design Serge Cicerone and Bernard le Gall supervising storyboards. The animation is done by Hong-Guang Animation Suzhou, with associated producer George Chang and assistant producer Mandy Le, coordinating producers Linus Lee and Sophie Huang, and animation supervisors SKinny Wen, Anthony Wang, Max Ma, Denis Du, Jack Zhou, and Sunny Sun.

Music is by Laurent Cayol, Francois Monfeuga, Jacques Bastello, and Olivier Lanneluc. Musical editing is done by Dargaud-Marina - Emi Virgin Music Publishing.

Additional work by Laurent-Christophe de Ruelle and Nathalie Coupal and Kun Jalabet.
