= Nick & Perry =

Animated television series

- Genre: Comedy; Science-fiction
- Created by: Udo Beissel
- Composer: Danny Chang
- Countries of origin: France; Germany
- Original languages: French; German; English
- No. of seasons: 2
- No. of episodes: 52

Production
- Executive producers: Robert Réa; Michael Schaack; Stephan Schesch; Thorsten Wegener; Michaela Niemeyer; Dr. Sylvia Rothblum; Hartmut G. Raushcer
- Running time: 22 minutes
- Production companies: Ellipsanime; EM.TV & Merchandising; Victory Media Group

Original release
- Network: M6 (France); KI.KA (Germany)
- Release: October 25, 2000 – 2001

Nick & Perry (also known as Les Marchien) is an animated television series created by Udo Beissel for Cartoon Network. It is about two alien dogs, Nick and Perry, who crash land on Earth and try to blend in with normal dogs, while hiding their alien secret from the people. The series stars Rolf Berg and Daniel Werner as the titular characters, Nick and Perry. The program originally ran from 2000 to 2001, broadcasting 52 episodes over two seasons.

== Premise ==
Nick and Perry, the title characters of the series, are two alien dogs, who crash-landed from their planet Dogmas, to planet Earth. They have to disguise themselves as regular dogs, to prevent their secret from coming out, or else they will be sold to science. Perry and Nick study Earth culture throughout the series while also trying to find a way home, with Perry interested in the functions and workings of Earth culture, and Nick looking at the bright side of things.

=== Characters ===
- Nick is a tall, orange dog with a proud stature. He is very fascinated in Earth life, especially television, and his love interest, Sofia. He is lazy, loves pleasure, and is very optimistic, not having a bad thought about anyone. Unlike other dogs, he is a vegetarian. He is not too smart compared to his friend, Perry, although the two can work together well.
- Perry is a small, blue dog resembling a beagle. He is highly intelligent, and is extraordinarily talented in technology and can build highly complex apparatus out of simple human objects. The easy-going Nick often causes him a lot of trouble, especially when he messes up his return plans. Despite this, they are friends, and they both work well together.
- Lucy is a little girl who wanted nothing more than a dog for her birthday. When a UFO crashed overnight in her garden and the normally upright and talking dog manners Nick and Perry had to disguise themselves as earth dogs, she thought they were a gift from her father. Lucy is a very bright, adventurous only child.
- Frank is a history professor and a single father. When Lucy thinks the two dog manners are a present from him, he can't bring himself to disappoint her and keeps Nick and Perry. Frank is often a little absent-minded and gullible.
- Mr. Smith is Frank and Lucy's spiteful neighbor and a part-time UFO hunter who tries to catch Nick and Perry in non-dog behavior and then sell them to science.

== Production ==
Development & production for the series was announced in 1998 and 1999 under the direction of Tony Barnes when Ellipse Animation partnered with German entertainment production alum TFC Trickompany Filmproduktion and Victory 16. Film Production to develop & produce an animated series entitled Nick and Perry-Alien Dogs with French broadcaster M6 and German broadcaster WDR had been boarded to air the series in France and Germany while Danny Chang would composed the music.

By March 2001, German kids & family entertainment and production/distribution company EM.TV & Merchandising AG had joined Ellipsanime's upcoming television series now being remamed to just, Nick & Perry and replaced Trickompany as co-producer and would handle distribution to the series internationally except for France.

It was first broadcast on October 25, 2000 by M6 in France. In Germany, the series was shown from September 11–27, 2001 on Ki.Ka.

Distribution to Nick & Perry changed hands starting in July 2003, when Ellipsanime's former parent Canal+ via its unit StudioExpand, had sold the Ellipsanime to French media entertainment conglomerate Média-Participations alongside their French publishing house Dargaud, with Mediatoon Distribution currently handled distribution to the series in France. Meanwhile in July 2008, Belgian children's entertainment group Studio 100 via its Munich-based German distribution division Studio 100 Media had brought co-producer EM.Entertainment and its programming library from Sport1 Medien and currently handled worldwide distribution outside of France.

== See also ==
- List of German television series
