= Chumballs =

French/Belgian animated series

- Genre: Adventure; Science fiction
- Based on: L'odyssée du temps by: Maxime Péroz; Michèle Graveline
- Directed by: Bruno Desraisses
- Composer: François Elie Roulin
- Countries of origin: France; Belgium
- Original language: French
- No. of seasons: 1
- No. of episodes: 26

Production
- Production companies: Ellipse Animation; Les Films de la Perrine; Araneo Belgium

Original release
- Network: France 5
- Release: October 31, 2009

Chumballs (French: Les Chumballs) is a 2009 animated series that aired on France 5.

== Premise ==
An environmentally unlivable environment on Earth following a catastrophic event has driven humans to live underground. They dispatched robots called Chumballs out to the surface to restore Earth. The Chumballs are supposed to beam a signal down to the humans once their work is complete and confirm that the surface can be resided again. But the humans haven't received the signal, forgot the Chumballs, and are forced by the council to remain inside the Earth. Three kids, Solana, Stel, and Tom, and their robot Tago, leave the underground and explore the surface of Earth on a goal to search and reactivate the Chumballs.

== Characters ==
- Solana -- The main protagonist of the series. She is a girl educated by Master Pakadis regarding on Earth and the Chumballs. She has the ability to identify plants.
- Stel -- A friend of Solana. He can think before acting while solving problems.
- Tom -- The younger brother of Stel. He is very curious and can get distracted by what he sees.
- Master Pakadis -- A wise old man who believes the Chumballs' mission is in peril and challenges the council's message. He communicates the kids during their adventure through Tago.
- Tago -- A Chumball-styled robot built by Stel that accompanies the kids. It is able to use several functions and tools that helps the kids.
- Voltar -- The main antagonist of the series. He wants to disrupt nature and capture the Chumballs.
- GMX -- The robot henchman of Voltar.
- The Chumballs -- The spherical robots dispatched by the humans to recover the Earth's environment. They are named after their designer Bob Chumball. They function like machines, but they interact and have minds like that of living beings. There are 24 Chumballs, each focusing on a different environment. All episodes except the first and last ones focus on each one of them.

== Production ==
Chumballs was based on the comic book series L'odyssée du temps by Maxime Péroz, a graduate of the École supérieure des arts décoratifs in Strasbourg, and Michèle Graveline. There was also an interactive Chumballs website that existed as of 2001.
