= Taratabong =

Italian cartoon series

- Genre: Animation
- Created by: Marco Bigliazzi
- Composer: Patrizio Fariselli
- Countries of origin: Italy; France; United States; Australia
- Original languages: Italian; French
- No. of seasons: 3
- No. of episodes: 52

Production
- Running time: 6 minutes
- Production companies: Toposodo; Ellipsanime; Rai Fiction; Amblin Entertainment; Sticky Pictures

Original release
- Network: Rai 3
- Release: 4 January 2009 – September 14, 2010
- Network: Disney Jr.
- Release: 15 July 2024 – February 14, 2027

Taratabong: The World of the Meloditties (original Italian: Taratabong! Il Mondo dei Musicilli) is an animated preschool children's television series produced by Italian animation studio Toposodo and Paris-based French animation production studio Ellipsanime, based on an idea by Marco Bigliazzi and Fabrizio Bondi, and distributed worldwide by Mediatoon. It is intended for children aged 2 to 4 years.

Taratabong is the world inhabited by the Meloditties, which are animated musical instruments. The cartoon won the 2009 Pulcinella Award for best TV series for preschool children. The show released a St. Louis Cardinals-themed episode set in the live-action stadium during the May 26, 2024 game, which was released on June 26, 2026. In Australia, the series was produced under the title Going High.

== Characters ==
=== Main characters ===
- Trumpee (a childish female trumpet, Snaree's sister)
- Snaree (a comical male snare drum, Trumpee's brother)
- Pino (a little sweet, bubbly, and friendly male upright toy piano, Trumpee and Snaree's best friend)
- Maestro Nomo (voiced by Frank Welker, a male metronome and the music teacher)
- Bone (a male trombone, father of Trumpee and Snaree)
- Drumba (a female bass drum, mother of Trumpee and Snaree)
- The Xylo brothers (individual keys on a xylophone)
- Grando (a male grand piano, father of Pino)
- The Narrator (voiced by Sharon Mann in English, a female narrator who interacts with and talks to the Meloditties, debuted in episode 3)

=== Supporting characters ===
- Pipeorg (a male pipe organ)
- Barello (a male barrel organ)
- Trebass (a male double bass, Iolin's dad)
- Mari and Bimba (marimbas)
- Chimeo (a female Chimes)
- Rino (a female tambourine)
- Grandpa Tuba (a male Tuba, father of Bone)
- Fluto (a female in English and male in Polish flute)
- Tymp and Tump (the timpani twins)
- Iolin (a male violin)
- Tarrita (a female in English and male in Polish girly girl guitar)
- Paco (a male bass guitar, Electra's cousin)
- Electra (a female tomboy electric guitar)
- Jo (a male banjo)
- Andolino (a male mandolin, Tarrita's cousin)
- Robo (a male in English and female in Polish robot-shaped synthesizer)
- The Tchycapoon Tribe (a series of percussion instruments)
- Aunt Accordia (a female accordion, Trumpee and Snaree's aunt)
- Penny (a female Penny whistle, or Tin Whistle)
- Professor Harpsy (a male Harpsichord)
- Lam, Ello and Phone (3 Jew's Harps)
- The Sax Brothers (a band of saxophones)
- Clari (a male clarinet)
- Clarence (a male bass clarinet)
- Ocarina (ocarina)
- Soon (a male scaredy-cat bassoon)
- Nola (a female bossy Pianola)
- Frenchi (a French horn)
- Tweeti (an English horn)
- Boe (a male oboe)
- Agatha (the female harp)
- Plate and Saucer (two cymbals, cousins of Trumpee and Snaree)
- Gingh Gong (a giant gong)
- Viola (a viola, Iolin's mom)
- Cello (a cello, Iolin's older brother)
- Tom & Tim (a pair of tom-drums, Drumba's brothers)

== List of episodes ==
=== Season 1 ===
1. The Meloditties / Where's Do? / The Bum Note / The Way to School
2. The Mysterious Track / Splish Splash / Hide and Go Seek ... the Echo / Happy Birthday!
3. Here Not There / The Sax Brothers / Shy Fluto / A Quiet Winter
4. Soft and Loud / Wind Song / Carnival Time / Happy and Sad
5. The Yawning Double Bass / The Off-Key Guitar / Follow the Beat / Musical Theater
6. Taking Turns / Robo the Synthesizer / The Magic Carousel / Jump Up
7. Tarrita and Her Cousins / Ding Dong Bell / Big Voice, Little Voice / The Music of the Stars
8. Grandpa Tuba / The Meloditty Big Band / A Strange Lesson / Drumba, We've Got Visitors
9. Megaphone and Microphone / A Bad Day in Taratabong / Giant Pipeorg / Party Time in the Forest
10. Lamellophones / The Tympani Twins / Ghing Gong / What Soon, the Bassoon, Saw
11. Moonlight Sonata / Sound Patterns / Clary, the Chatterbox Clarinet / Professor Harpsy
12. The Amazing Harp / The Horn Friends / The Pianola / Penny Among the Pumpkins
13. Paco, the Electric Bass / Taperee Remembers / Practice Makes Perfect / The String Family
14. The St. Louis Cardinals Problem
