= Journey to the Heart of the World =

- Voices of: Malcolm Robinson; Andrea Bruce; Greta Pitush; Gillian Gardner; Simon Prescott; Colin Phillips; Robert Axelrod; Sam Strong; Tom Wyner
- Countries of origin: France; Belgium
- No. of episodes: 26

Production
- Running time: 30 minutes
- Production companies: Media Films TV; Saban International Paris; Dargaud Films; Belvision Studios

Original release
- Network: Canal+ / France 3 (France); RTBF (Belgium)
- Release: September 6, 1993 – 1994

Journey to the Heart of the World (French: Les Voyages de Corentin) is an animated series that ran from September 6, 1993 to 1994. It was based on the Franco-Belgian comic strip Corentin.

Ownership of the series passed to Disney in 2001 when Disney acquired Fox Kids Worldwide, which also includes Saban Entertainment.

== Plot ==
The series follows the travels of the best sailor in the world Cory Feldoe, who crossed the world far and wide in search of new lands, friends, and experiences. Cory's father was a sailor as well and died of mysterious circumstances. Cory never came to terms with his father's death. He continued in search of him. He decided to end his journey around the world when he found his father.

== Cast ==
- Malcolm Robinson – Cory Feldoe
- Andrea Bruce – Marie
- Greta Pitush – Sarina
- Gillian Gardner – Mademoiselle Giselle
- Simon Prescott – Captain Touchet
- Dave Mallow – Louis
- Robert Axelrod – Scarface
- Sam Strong – Three-Fingers
- Tom Wyner – Prince Blackstone

Direction, Casting, Supervising Producer Doug Stone

== Episodes ==
No.	Title
1	"Destiny Departs"
2	"Danger in Messina"
3	"Beware of Zeus"
4	"Danger In Cairo"
5	"Marooned"
6	"The Ghost Ship"
7	"The Volcano"
8	"Against the Mountain"
9	"Into Slavery"
10	"The Tomb Robbers"
11	"The Plantation"
12	"The Chosen One"
13	"Slaves of the Golden Shackles"
14	"The Brotherhood of the Bright Star"
15	"The Wreckers"
16	"The Curse"
17	"Into the Hands of the Enemy"
18	"The Wild Thing"
19	"Lost Friends"
20	"Moment of Joy"
21	"The Gun of Goa"
22	"The Invitation"
23	"The Elephants' Graveyard"
24	"The Island of Golden Rain"
25	"Farewell, Dear Friends"
26	"The Final Battle"
