= Les Cartooneurs Associés =

French animation studio

- Industry: Animation studio
- Founded: 1982
- Headquarters: Paris, France
- Number of employees: 12
- Parent: Média Participations (2002–2022)
- Website: www.ellipseanimation.com

Les Cartooneurs Associés also known as Les Cartooneurs was a French animation studio most notable for creating the animated TV series Martin Morning. The studio became a subsidiary of French publishing company Média-Participations in 2002.

The studio was established in 1982 by film director and executive producer Denis Olivieri.

By June 2022, Les Cartooneurs Associés' parent company Média-Participations who acquired the former twenty years prior had brought all of their Paris and Angouleme-based animation production labels together which included Les Cartooneurs Associés into a new production umbrella group named Ellipse Animation with Les Cartooneurs Associés being folded into the new animation production group.

== Filmography ==
=== Television series ===
Title	Years	Network	Notes
Bouli	1989–1991	France 2	
Baby Follies	1993–1994	Canal+	co-production with Shanghai Animation Film Studio and C2A
Tom and Pippo	1994–1997	France 3	co-production with Ellipse License, Elma Animation, Canal+ D.A and TAL Productions
Mummy Nanny	2001	France 2/Canal J; Super RTL (Germany)	co-production with EM.TV & Merchandising; Co-owned with Studio 100 International
Martin Morning	2003–2018	France 3	co-production with Fantasia Animation
Yakari	2005–2017	France 3 WDR (seasons 3–5)	season 4 only co-production with Storimages, Belvision, Ellipsanime Productions (seasons 3–5), ARD (seasons 3–5) and 2 Minutes
Shaolin Wuzang	2005–2006	France 3 Jetix Europe; ZDF (Germany); TV 2 (Denmark)	co-production with ZDF Enterprises and Fantasia Animation
Tempo Express	2011	France 3	co-production with Fantasia Animation
H2O: Mermaid Adventures	2015	France 3 ZDF (Germany); Netflix (Worldwide)	co-production with ZDF Enterprises, Jonathan M. Shiff Productions and Fantasia Animation; Based on the live-action series H2O: Just Add Water by Jonathan M. Shiff
The Jungle Book	2019–2020	TF1/Piwi+ Nickelodeon India (India); ZDF (Germany)	inherited from MoonScoop co-production with Ellipsanime Productions, DQ Entertainment and ZDF Enterprises
The Smurfs	2022–2023	TF1; La Trois & Ketnet (Belgium); Kika (Germany); Nickelodeon (International)	season 2 only co-production with Dupuis Edition & Audiovisual and Peyo Productions
Diaper-A-Mons	TBA		In development
