= Potlach (TV series) =

French-Italian animated children's television series (2006)

Potlach is an animated television series, co-produced in France and Italy, produced by Ellipsanime and Rai Fiction. 26 episodes aired on the French television network France 3 during the summer of 2006. The series follows the lives of anthropomorphic farm animals, that live on a farm without humans.

The series has been dubbed into English, and has been released on DVD.

== See also ==
- List of French animated television series
