= Xcalibur =

CGI sword-and-sorcery children's television series

- Created by: Amélie Aubert; Philippe Druillet; Benjamin Legrand
- Starring: Ben Small; Tom Eastwood; Jules Dejongh
- Opening theme: Ray Fabi (music)
- Ending theme: Ray Fabi (music)
- Countries of origin: Canada; France
- Original languages: English; French
- No. of episodes: 40

Production
- Running time: 30 minutes
- Production companies: Ellipsanime; TVA International (early episodes); Tooncan Productions Inc. (later episodes)

Original release
- Network: YTV; Canal+ France 2
- Release: 1 September 2001 – 1 April 2002

Xcalibur is a CGI sword-and-sorcery children's television series that aired on YTV from 1 September 2001 to 1 April 2002.

The series is animated using a third-dimensional computer graphics application known as Alias Wavefront Maya.

== Premise ==
King Edwin, ruler of a medieval-like Kingdom is assassinated by his brother and regent, Bragan, who has made a truce with the evil warlock, Kwodahn. The murder is witnessed by Prince Erwann who carries out the dying King's final orders; to take Xcalibur and hide it in a safe place. After hiding the sword, Kwodahn curses Erwann, turning him to stone. Erwann's feisty teenage daughter, Princess Djana befriends Herik, a young apprentice of the exiled Shogis, a sect of sorcerers, who has been entrusted with the Book of Life, the collected knowledge of the Shogis. Together, they retrieve Xcalibur, however upon reaching the Royal Palace, they learn Bragan has taken control of the Kingdom as regent to Arthus, the 10-year-old sovereign, too young to rule himself, and confiscated Prince Erwann's lands as his own, falsely branding him as the assassin.

Unable to convince the lords or Arthus that Bragan is a traitor, Djana goes on the run with Herik, Tara - a member of the People of the Sea, often referred to as Barbarians - and Wip, a small dragon, and are branded outlaws by Bragan. Djana's resistance to Bragan's alliance with Kwodahn sparks a rebellion in the kingdom, assisted by the people of the villages of Mallory and Quinn, and (later), secretly assisted by Prince Duncan, one of the lords of the Kingdom.

== Characters ==
- Princess Djana — the fiery daughter of Prince Erwann, strongly opposed to Kwodahn and Prince Bragan. Her mother mysteriously disappeared, leaving Djana alone. She takes the sword Xcalibur to protect the innocent and to free her father from the curse.
- Herik — a young Shogi apprentice, rebellious by nature. During Bragan's attack on the Shogi Monastery, he is entrusted with the Book of Life by the Grand Magus. He befriends Djana and helps her to retrieve Xcalibur, going on the run with her.
- Tara — a young dark skin messenger sent by the People of the Sea. She is sent to negotiate with Prince Erwann, who was the go-between for negotiating a peace treaty between King Edwin and her people; peace in exchange for a place to settle in the kingdom. She arrives too late, and is declared an outlaw along with Djana and Herik it also implied she comes from a distant land possibly Africa or The Middle East.
- Wip — a small flying dragon (with four legs) who was once the Totem of Sapphire.
- Prince Bragan — King Edwin's younger brother, who has him assassinated. He is in league with Kwodahn, and attempts to subvert his nephew Arthus to become king.
- King Arthus — the 10 year old sovereign, son of the late King Edwin. He is naive, easily led by his uncle, Bragan who believes his story that Erwann assassinated the King to steal Xcalibur.
- Kwodahn — the Devil, who lives in a flying castle. He carries out his plans for domination through Bragan and Walka, who have sold their souls to him.
- Wolf — the leader of the People of the Sea, raiders who attack the Kingdom for food and riches. King Edwin attempted to negotiate with them, offering them a land to settle in return for peace, however his assassination prevents this from happening. He eventually discovers that Herik is his son.
- Walka — one of the three Sylph sisters in Brocelianda, dressed in a green gown, the Sylph of the Appearances who leans towards serving Kwodahn, has become an evil sorceress. She is banished from the Sylphs by Fedora, who turns into a Medusa-like creature. As a Sylph, she possesses a jewel: Sylph Bracelet. She eventually redeems herself by freeing Queen Lorna, and defying Kwodahn. Her Totem is a Two-Headed Snake. She is the Aunt of Djana and godmother of Queen Lorna.
- Fedora — one of the three Sylph sisters in Brocelianda. Sylph of Time and Queen of the Sylphs, dressed in a blue gown. She possesses a jewel: Sylph Necklace, and a wand. Her Totem is a Unicorn. She is the Aunt of Djana.
- Sapphire — one of the three Sylph sisters in Brocelianda, dressed in a red gown, the Sylph of the Expressions and Djana's mother. She possesses a jewel: Sylph Ring. Her Totem is Wip. She is the mother of Djana and wife of Erwann.
- Mussi — governess to King Arthus. She is devoted to the care of Arthus.
- Queen Lorna — King Arthus' mother and rightful regent of the Kingdom. Bragan decided to get rid of Lorna first, and gave the task of assassinating her to her godmother; Walka. Unable to kill her goddaughter, she hid Lorna in Mussi's body. She is eventually released by Walka in a bout of redemption, and replaces Bragan as the regent.
- Prince Erwann — Princess Djana's father. He was Chief of King Edwin's Army and his close friend, who worked as a bridge between Edwin and Tara, representing the People of the Sea. It is implied he had a relationship of sorts with Tara. He is cursed by Kwodahn and turned to stone when he refuses to hand over Xcalibur to him.
- King Edwin — the late ruler of the Kingdom and Arthus' father. He is portrayed as a just and fair ruler, who wanted to make peace with the People of the Sea.
- Zeky Zek — Wolf's subordinate.
- Zoldan — a Shaman who accompanies the People of the Sea. He is often used as a pawn by Kwodahn for his plans.
- Morgan — an experienced Shogi who leads the exiled Shogis to a new life on the Shogi Island. He is a close friend of Herik.
- The Shogi Master — sometimes called the Grand Magus, a powerful sorcerer and leader of the Shogis.
- Silkar — a citizen of the village of Mallory, and one of Djana's allies. He eventually becomes a prominent figure in the rebellion against Bragan.
- Arped — a citizen of the hamlet of Quinn, and another prominent figure in the resistance against Bragan.
- Will — one of the leaders of the Wandering City, a city which floats above the sea, inhabited by pacifists.
- Erin — one of the inhabitants of Quinn. She is initially a spy for Bragan, passing on information about the rebellion's plans to attack Bragan's camp and kill him. However, she redeems herself and becomes a close friend of Djana.
- Prince Duncan — also known as the Green Prince. He becomes Djana's most powerful and trusted ally within the council after she helps to save his lands from Kwodahn's magic. He is strongly opposed to Bragan's plans.
- The Red Prince — one of the lords of the Kingdom. He is Bragan's closest ally on the council.
- The Yellow Prince — another of the Kingdom's lords.

== Voices ==
- Joanna Ruiz Rodriguez as Princess Djana / King Arthus
- Ben Small as Herik
- Jules de Jongh as Tara
- Tom Clarke-Hill as Kwodahn / Wip
- Regine Candler as Walka / Mussi
- Tom Eastwood as Prince Bragan
- Andy Turvey as King Edwyn / Zoldan
- Eric Meyers as Wolf / Prince Erwann

== Episode list ==
The following is a full list of episodes in the order they are presented on DVD. Some of the episodes are not in their correct chronological order.

No.	Title (French title)	Directed by	Written by	Original release date	U.S. viewers (millions)
1	"The Sword of Justice (L'épée de justice)"	Didier Pourcel	Benjamin Legrand & Amélie Aubert	September 1, 2001	TBA
Before dying, King Edwynn entrusts Xcalibur to Price Erwann’s care and tells him to hide in an underground lake. Upon his return, Erwann is turned into a statue by the demon Kwodahn in front of the very eyes of his daughter, the Princess Djana. Djana meets Herik, a young Shogi monk, who reveals Xcalibur’s hiding place to her. Understanding that only Xcalibur can overcome the evil sorcerer and save the kingdom, Djana decides to recover the Sword of Justice. But Kwodahn is determined to keep her from attaining her goal…
2	"The Barbarian (La barbare)"	Didier Pourcel	Benjamin Legrand & Amélie Aubert	September 8, 2001	TBA
Djana, accompanied by Herik, travels to the Royal Palace where she asks young King Arthus to grant her the right to keep Xcalibur and fight Kwodahn. But Arthus and the council of princes answer that her father, Erwann, assassinated King Edwynn and stole Xcalibur! Djana and Herik are on the verge of being arrested when a Barbarian named Tara appears and helps them escape. Who is this mysterious young woman, and why did she help Djana?
3	"The Heart of The Beast (Le cœur de la bête)"	Clément Estournel	Jean-Christophe Derrien	September 15, 2001	TBA
An evil beast is roaming about the lands of the Green Prince, attacking the villagers of Mallory and stealing their souls. Djana and her friends, alerted by the exodus of the local population, try and penetrate the mystery. Will our heroes be able to overcome their own fear? And how ill they discover who is behind the beast?
4	"The Request For The Just"	Clément Estournel	Jean-Christophe Derrien	September 22, 2001	TBA
Bragan attempts to starve the population which is under the protection of the Green Prince. Duncan, the prince, opposes the Regent and demands an exceptional hearing with the young king. But Kwodahn replaces the Green Prince with a double. Will Djana and her friends understand? Will they come back intact from the World of Clones?
5	"A Charming Prince"	Didier Pourcel	Dominique Latil	September 29, 2001	TBA
When Djana meets Adrien, the young girl succumbs to the charm of the handsome young man. She doesn’t hesitate a second to take off alone with him to save her father’s castle, which Bragan is threatening to burn down. But she falls into a trap and finds herself locked up in the jail of her own castle. Will Herik and Tara arrive in time to save her and prevent Bragan from taking possession of Xcalibur?
6	"The Hexed Chessboard"	Clément Estournel	Benjamin Legrand	October 6, 2001	TBA
While the young King Arthus plays a party of chess with his uncle Bragan, our heroes are projected onto a gigantic chessboard, where they must battle chess pieces representing the forces of the Kingdom. Our heroes succeed in taking the upper hand, which infuriates Kwodahn. Djana finds herself face to face with the statue of her father. Will Djana and her friends win this diabolical game? And at what price?
7	"The Destiny of the Shogis"	Clément Estournel	Christophe Poujol & Benoit Graffin	October 13, 2001	TBA
Herik decodes a message in the Book of Life requesting him to go the Shogi Monastery of the South. He is accompanied by Djana and Tara who find that the monastery is in the hands of Bragan. The surviving Shogis are being kept prisoner. Djana and her companions free a Shogi named Morgan. What they don't know is that Kwodahn placed Morgan under a spell and that the shogi has become an instrument of the forces of evil. Will Herik overcome the resentment of having been betrayed by his friend Morgan? Will Xcalibur, in Djana's hands, be strong enough to thwart Kwodahn's nefarious scheme to annihilate the Shogis?
8	"The Wandering City"	Clément Estournel	Benjamin Legrand	October 20, 2001	TBA
Herik. Dana and Tara escape from Bragan's soldiers in a flying machine constructed by Herik, which resembles that of Leonardo Da Vinci. They manage as best they can until they arrive at a mysterious ghost town floating above the sea. In the city's streets, filled with colourless buildings, silent living-dead creatures pace back and forth. When the horrible beasts launch an attack against them, our heroes realise they are Kwodahn's puppets. Tara valiantly holds the monsters off while her friends precipitate towards a tower which conceals a strange device that is sapping the surrounding energy. Caught in a trap, they call upon Wip, Djana's mini-dragon. Will he find the defect in the armour-plating of the infernal contraption?
9	"The Broken Sword"	Didier Pourcel	Benjamin Legrand	October 27, 2001	TBA
Wolff and his Men of the Sea disembark in the kingdom to recover Tara. But the young woman refuses to follow them. Hiding in the deserted castle of Erwann, our heroes try in vain to explain to Wolff that they are on the same side. Faced with Wolff's stubbornness, Djana challenges him to a duel. Kwodahn takes advantage of this casts a spell on Wolff’s sword, while Bragan's troops set off for the castle. How will our heroes escape this double threat?
10	"The Test of Blood"	Clément Estournel	Dominique Latil	November 3, 2001	TBA
Herik is captured by the Men of the Sea and led to their chief. Wolff' tells the young Shogi that he is his father and that he wants him to remain by his side. Herik refuses, but Wolff cannot resign himself' to letting Herik go. Tara, with whom Wolff is in love, offers to stay if he will let the young man go free. While Djana tries to recover the Book of Life. Herik challenges Wolff to a duel, the outcome of which could be fatal. Which one will win: strength or wisdom? friends win this diabolical game? And at what price?
11	"The Slumbering Palace"	Didier Pourcel	Benjamin Legrand	November 10, 2001	TBA
When he learns that Djana is trying to get into contact with King Arthus, Kwodahn orders Walka to throw a spell on the Royal Palace. The young King Arthus escapes, but all of the other inhabitants of the palace are plunged into a deep sleep. Our heroes come to the king’s rescue. Will they succeed in thwarting Kwodahn's plot? Will the young king remember the discussion he had with Diana?
12	"A Second Chance"	Didier Pourcel	Dominique Latil	November 17, 2001	TBA
Due to an error made by Djana, Tara is captured by Bragan and condemned to death. In order to save her. Djana asks Herik to help her journey back in time through the Chessboard. Pursued by Bragan, Djana must act in the past to change it, in this manner perturbing the spacio-temporal continuum. Will she succeed in changing Tara's fate under these conditions?
13	"The Lure"	Clément Estournel	Jean-Christophe Derrien	TBA	TBA
No longer able to stand her quest, Djana places Xcalibur back inside the Cavern of Signs, our heroes are then transported 10 years into the future to a serene Kingdom ruled by the grownup Arthus. Erwann is free once again... But this future, is it really as idyllic as it appears? Or is it hiding a much more appalling reality?
14	"Nadja"	Clément Estournel	Christophe Poujol & Benoit Graffin	TBA	TBA
Led into the Enchanted Forest by her search for a lite girl abducted by a band of Golgoths, Djana is suddenly attacked by another her clone. The other "Djana" manages to take possession of Xcalibur after pushing the real Djana off a cliff into the turbulent waters of the Neverending Sea. Wip and Tara are also taken in by the malevolent doppelganger. Only Herik, alerted by "Djana's" unusual behaviour, manages to escape with the Book of Life..
15	"I Have Faith in You"	Clément Estournel	Jean-Christophe Derrien	TBA	TBA
Following a tactical error, the members of the Resistance suspect Tara of being allied with Bragan. The Barbarian tries to explain herself, but no one will believe her. Did Tara really betray her friends? Does Djana trust her friend enough to risk her own life?
16	"The Seventh Crystal"	Clément Estournel	Christophe Poujol	TBA	TBA
A giant maelstrom is approaching over the sea and chaos reigns at the frontiers of the kingdom. In order to calm the elements, the Grand Magus has called for a meeting of the seven Shogis in order to reunite their crystals. Our heroes receive a cryptic message from Morgan, the blind Shogi. He asks them to meet him as quickly as possible on the Wandering City...
17	"The Forbidden Experience"	Clément Estournel	Christophe Poujol	TBA	TBA
Arthus finds a mysterious parchment which tells about the supposed existence of an Elixir of Life. He runs away from the Royal Palace to find it, in the hope of resuscitating his father, King Edwynn. Our heroes set off and discover that the Elixir of Life was the outcome of an experiment which the Shogis, upon realising its full danger, had decided to keep secret.
18	"The Toll Of The Past"	Clément Estournel	Jean-Christophe Derrien	TBA	TBA
Tara, mortally wounded, asks the inhabitants of the Wandering City to help her. But they claim that there is nothing to be done for the Barbarian. Djana discovers that the City holds a cargo of dried fish (with incredible regenerative powers) that could save her friend. but she accidentally sets fire to the stock. The guardians of the City decide that Djana will be used as bait for the Creature from the Bottom of the Sea who supplies the City with Dried Fish. Herik opposes these ancient practices.
19	"The Enchanted Forest"	Didier Pourcel	Pili Spinoza & Lydie Carré	TBA	TBA
The code-sphere that created Xcalibur is held secure in the Enchanted Forest by Fedora. Learning that the Sylph's powers have weakened, Kwodahn orders Walka to recover the sphere. Alerted, our heroes come to the rescue of Fedora. In order to regenerate Fedora's powers, Djana returns to the past to recover the ring of her mother, the Sapphire Sylph. Will Djana return in time to save her friends, who are now Walka's prisoners, and recover the sphere from the sorceress's grasps?
20	"The Kiss"	Didier Pourcel	Yann Brion & Amélie Aubert	TBA	TBA
Arthus is dying on his tenth birthday. Our heroes realise that an evil spell was thrown upon the King the day he was born. Djana, Herik and Wip journey into the past to try and discover what this spell is and how to undo it. Meanwhile, Tara goes to the Royal Palace to administer a Shogi remedy to the young king. On her way she meets a druggist who accompanies her. What will our heroes discover in their trip to the past? Will they make it back in time to save the young king?
21	"The Strange Sickness"	Didier Pourcel	Dominique Latil	TBA	TBA
Thanks to Walka's magic, Bragan reduces the peasants of the kingdom into slavery. No one knows what fate the regent has in store for these prisoners who, once released, fall ill with an unknown disease. Djana and her companions try and discover the secret that Bragan in hiding by penetrating the Evil Forest. But courage alone is not always enough when faced with Black Magic…
22	"The Dragon's Breath"	Didier Pourcel	Eric Rondeaux & Yann Brion	TBA	TBA
A premonitory dream convinces Djana that Bragan will soon possess a sword capable of rivalling Xcalibur. But in order to obtain this sword, he needs the breath of a dragon. Our heroes take off for Drakken Braath, the volcano which is the home of the last Great Dragon. But when our heroes arrive, they realise that Bragan and Walka have gotten there first. Will Bragan succeed in forging the evil sword? As for Wip, this adventure will mark him forever.
23	"The Promised Land"	Clément Estournel	Christophe Poujol & Thomas Forward	TBA	TBA
One morning, the Barbarians arrive at the castle of Djana's father and begin to settle in with their weapons and baggage. It seems that Bragan has entered into a pact with Wolf whereby the Barbarian chief would take over from Prince Erwann. Djana tries to persuade Wolff reject this unholy alliance but the Barbarian leader refuses to abandon the land that has long been claimed by his people. His only wish is for his estranged son Herik to join him at the head of the clan. So Herik gets caught up in the conflict pitting Djana against his father.
24	"The Ice Fortress"	Clément Estournel	Eric Rondeaux & Amélie Aubert	TBA	TBA
Thinking that a poor wretch named Algar is the messenger of the Magus Shogi, Djana, Herik and Tara set off on an expedition towards the snow-covered mountains. They do not realise that they are walking straight into Kwodahn's plot. The sorcerer gave Bragan the physical appearance of the Magus Shogi and wrapped the entire monastery in a thick sheet of ice. Thrilled to have liberated his mentor, Herik hands him over the Book of Life - upon his request - but Djana hesitates to do the same with Xcalibur. Suddenly. thanks to Tara, the truth breaks to the surface and the three adventurers must desperately defend their lives from the fierce attack of the cruel Griffin. Just as the Forces of Evil are about to take over. Djana, Herik and Tara discover Algar’s family, held prisoner to oblige the poor peasant to betray them. Standing on the edge of a precipice, will they find a way to escape Kwodahn’s evil curse?
25	"The Secret of the Sylphs"	Didier Pourcel & Marc Boreal	Christophe Poujol & Thomas Forward	TBA	TBA
Walka the sorceress wounds Wip with a poisoned spear. In a Shogi monastery, Morgan, the blind Shogi, sounds the body of the little dragon, which has become surprisingly rigid. Alas, faced with this magic spell, the Shogi doctor is impotent. Only a Sylph can free him. Sapphire, the mother of Djana, is no longer part of this world and Walka has sold her soul to Kwodhan; their only chance to save Wip is Fedora, the Queen of the Sylphs, still asleep in her Water Palace deep inside the Enchanted Forest...
26	"The Return"	Clément Estournel	Eric Rondeaux & Yann Brion	TBA	TBA
Walka has recovered her Sylph soul, yet she would also like to recover her physical appearance. But first, Fedora wants her to repair the evil deeds she did when she was a Sorceress. Walka returns to the Palace, but is arrested by Bragan just as she is throwing a spell on Mussi, King Arthus's nanny. In the meantime our heroes Iearn that Mussi holds a secret upon which the entire future of the kingdom depends. What is this secret and how does it concern Walka? This is precisely what our heroes must try and find out…
27	"Golden Eyes"	Clément Estournel	Yann Brion & Amélie Aubert	TBA	TBA
Our heroes discover that Walka has kidnapped the child of the Green Prince, their ally. The particularity of this little girl is that she has golden eyes. Djana and her friends find the trace of the sorceress and recover the child. They discover that Walka has hypnotised Djana using the baby's golden eyes as a relay for the powers of the two-headed serpent of the Evil Forest, Djana then goes to the royal palace to hand Xcalibur over to Bragan. Will Herik and Tara avoid the trap?
28	"The Night of the Two Moons"	Clément Estournel	Benjamin Legrand	TBA	TBA
The council of princes has gathered at the Royal Palace to treat the Kingdom's problems. An ancient belief holds that the spectre of kings who died a violent death reappears at the conjunction of the two moons. In effect, as the eclipse approaches, King Edwynn's ghost starts to haunt the palace. The young King Arthus is completely distraught. Only Bragan exults, for it is in fact a ghost created by Kwodahn.
29	"The Tournament"	Clément Estournel	Jean-Christophe Derrien	TBA	TBA
Djana and her friends learn that Bragan is organising a tournament, the winner of which will take possession of Erwann's lands. Outraged, Djana flees. The Tournament starts off with a mad race across the Kingdom. Silkar, Janur, the Green, Yellow and Red Princes. Adrien, and a young masked man (who could be Djana in disguise) all participate. Bragan is confident: he is sure that he will be able to confuse the Princess and win the tournament thanks to his protégé Adrien who possesses an indestructible armour.
30	"Presumed Guilty"	Clément Estournel	Dominique Latil	TBA	TBA
To wash her father's name clean, for he is accused of having assassinated King Edwynn, *Diana decides to find the real assassin herself. But clues are scarce and Bragan is determined to keep her from shedding any light on this dark affair. Djana wonders if she will be able to prove her father's innocence in the eyes of the others and, maybe, even in her own as well.
31	"The Invisible Monastery"	Clément Estournel	Christophe Poujol	TBA	TBA
Searching for the fourth monastery, which could shelter his Shogi brothers from Kwodhan's attacks, Herik discovers that it is hidden in an unsuspected dimension inside the Book of Life... But Kwodhan succeeds in infiltrating one of his creatures into this dimension, and. much like a virus, attacks the very strategy point of the monastery.
32	"The Initiation"	Clément Estournel	Christophe Poujol & Thomas Forward	TBA	TBA
While trying to maser the 6th telepathic sense of the Shogis, Herik falls into Kwodhan's trap. His consciousness is trapped inside the body of a Criffin, while his body is inhabited by the spirit of the horrible creature. Will Djana be able to undo the evil spell?
33	"Inheritance"	Clément Estournel	Dominique Latil	TBA	TBA
Walka uses witchcraft to make Djana's Sylph heritage resurface, Disoriented, distraught and panicked by these powers that she does not understand, Djana is manipulated by the sorceress. The young princess confronts her companions and is on the verge of handing Xcalibur over to Walka. Worried over their friend's health, Herik and Tara will have to Djana and secure Xcalibur.
34	"The Ice Shogi"	Clément Estournel	Christophe Poujol & Thomas Forward	TBA	TBA
One by one, the seven Shogis who have been scattered to the 4 corners of the Kingdom disappear. Our heroes carry out an inquiry. They discover that their disappearance is the work of a Shogi who once disappeared himself' in the mountains, and whom Kwodahn liberated from a coat of ice to serve his vengeance. This adversary is all the more fearsome as he himself' is a Shogi and knows their weak points.
35	"Vivid Memory"	Clément Estournel	Benjamin Legrand	TBA	TBA
During a combat with one of the Regent's patrols, Tara receives a blow upon the head and Djana and Herik are forced to quickly carry her off, unconscious. When Tara wakes up, she has lost her memory. She behaves exactly like in a previous life, when she had towed ferocious hatred for the young Shogi and all others like him. Kwodahn, watching from deep within his lair, decides to take advantage of the situation and seize Tara's soul.
36	"One Day"	Clément Estournel	Christophe Poujol & Amélie Aubert	TBA	TBA
Our heroes follow Walka into the past and find themselves in the era when she was a Sylph. They discover that Walka was in love with Erwann, Djana's father... Our heroes now understand the pain that pushed Walka to become a sorceress. But Walka/the Sylph “recognises" Djana and realises her love is hopeless. Desperate, she casts a spell on Erwann to prevent him from ever meeting Sapphire, Djana's mother. Will lose be stronger than mage? Will Djana be able to undo the curse and witness the first time her parents meet?
37	"Love and Duty"	Clément Estournel	Dominique Latil	TBA	TBA
Herik, searching for his roots, wants to find out who his mother is. He takes off to find Wolff his father, who also happens to be king of the Sea People, and discovers all of HIS past. While Djana is in charge of settling a conflict opposing Mallaury's men, Herik becomes conscious of the fact that, due to his double Shogi/Sea Man identity, he could be a catalyst for the unification between the two warring factions. Just as his mother was, Herik is determined to get Wolff to change, but Bragan, on the other hand, has a different plan in mind…
38	"In The King's Service (Au service du roi)"	Clément Estournel	Dominique Latil	TBA	TBA
Freed from her magic spell, Queen Lorna discovers that she is amnesiac. With the help of Wolff, our heroes elude the traps of Kwodahn and escort the queen to theRoyal Palace in the aim of helping her recover her memory. For this, Herik uses the 'psychic fingerprints' that the queen left behind in the Palace. But Kwodahn diverts the process and the queen turns evil, taking sides with Bragan. Will our heroes succeed in breaking Kwodahn's spell, and at what price?
39	"Quest For Justice (Le pardon)"	Clément Estournel	Amélie Aubert	TBA	TBA
Queen Lorna wants light to be shed on the events that rocked the kingdom during her absence. She summons Djana and her companions, requesting their presence at the Royal Palace. Our heroes discover that what is about to unfold is, in fact, their trial! Can they prove Bragan's lies wrong and regain the Queen's trust?
40	"The Duel (Le grand combat)"	Clément Estournel	Benjamin Legrand	TBA	TBA
Following Bragan's disappearance, the kingdom is at peace at last. But Kwodahn launches all of his forces in an ultimate battle, Sylphs and Shogis, People of the Sea, peasants and soldiers, everyone is subjected to attacks from Kwodhan's creatures in a kingdom given over 1o chaos. Will Diana be able to free her father? Will she find the way to Kwodahn's lair and eliminate the demon? Will we finally discover who it is hiding behind the mask of the terrible Sorcerer?

== Home media ==
Anchor Bay released the series on DVD in the UK on 15 November 2004 in the form of a ten-disc box set with four episodes per disc. The set contains an episode guide on the packaging but no other extras. It has a listed running time of 16 hours.

Anchor Bay's release features an error in the ordering of episodes, meaning that the correct chronological order has not been maintained. This particularly applies to the episodes The Secret of the Sylphs (episode 25) and The Return (episode 26), which should in fact immediately precede Love and Duty (episode 37).
