= Inami (TV series) =

- Genre: adventure
- Created by: Françoise Charpiat
- Directed by: Michel Pillyser
- Country of origin: France
- Original language: French
- No. of seasons: 1
- No. of episodes: 26

Production
- Executive producers: Robért Rea; Jacques Vercruyssen; Leon Perahia
- Production companies: Ellipsanime; Seahorse-Anim; JPF Productions; TTK; Araneo

Original release
- Network: TF1
- Release: November 22, 2007 – May 15, 2008

Inami is a French 2D animated television series set in Amazonia. It was created by Françoise Charpiat and directed by Michael Pillyser, and is distributed by the French company Mediatoon. The series first aired in France on TF1 in 2007, as part of the TFOU TV programming block.

== Plot ==
The series revolves around the adventures of Inami, a young Amazonian native of the tribe of the Bellacaibos who must face the everyday challenges of living in the rainforest. Inami, often accompanied by Shimiwe, Hyaema, or Aminata, is exposed to cultural traditions and personal issues that he must overcome with bravery and compassion.

== Characters ==
- Inami, an 11-year-old boy of the Bellacaïbos tribe
- Aminata, Inami's little sister, who mimics his actions
- Tatoon, Inami's pet armadillo, and his spirit double
- Shimiwe, Inami's best friend
- Carras, the old and wise shaman of the Bellacaïbos tribe
- Hyaema, an 11-year-old girl of the Patami tribe, the hereditary enemy of the Bellacaïbos and Inami's crush
- Morikas, the malicious shaman of the Patami tribe and major antagonist
- Pintos, father of Shimiwe and common accomplice to Morikas

== Episodes ==
1. I Had a Dream... November 22, 2007
2. The Dark of Curtain November 29, 2007
3. The Pink Dolphin December 6, 2007
4. The Salt Quest December 13, 2007
5. The Venom of Discord December 20, 2007
6. The Secret December 27, 2007
7. The Four Elements January 3, 2008
8. Big Brother January 10, 2008
9. The Flame Men January 17, 2008
10. The Forbidden Sanctuary January 24, 2008
11. The Dark Shaman January 31, 2008
12. The Crocodile Scale February 7, 2008
13. The Price of Freedom February 14, 2008
14. A Tatoune Full of Colors February 21, 2008
15. The Singing Mountain February 28, 2008
16. A Strange Village March 6, 2008
17. The Black Diamond March 13, 2008
18. The Double Link March 20, 2008
19. The Well of Dreams March 27, 2008
20. Mystery Island April 3, 2008
21. The Tatou Family April 10, 2008
22. The Eyes of The Grand Tatou April 17, 2008
23. The Twelve Teeth of the Shark April 24, 2008
24. A Life for a Life May 1, 2008
25. The Strange Message from the Hekuras May 8, 2008
26. The Test of Peace May 15, 2008

== Production ==
Development for Inami was announced in October 2007, when Ellipsanime colloaborated with Seahorse Productions to develop an 2D-animated series that is set in the Amazon rainforest with Ellipsanime and Seahorse Productions would serve as producers as French broadcasting network TF1 and Belgian broadcaster RTBF would broadcast the series in those countries while Ellipsanime's founder Robért Rea would serve as executive producer.

== Broadcast ==
The series has aired in Africa, United States, Belgium, Brazil, Hungary, Israel, Italy, Portugal, Romania, Serbia and Turkey.
