= Living with Dad =

- Genre: Comedy
- Based on: Dad by Nob
- Directed by: Daniel Klein
- Theme music composer: Thibault Kientz Agyeman
- Country of origin: France
- No. of seasons: 1
- No. of episodes: 52

Production
- Executive producers: Caroline Audebert; Caroline Duvochel; Raphaële Ingberg
- Producer: Arthur Colignon
- Production companies: Dupuis Edition & Audiovisuel; Belvision; Ellipsanime Productions; RTBF

Original release
- Network: La Trois; M6; Canal J; Gulli
- Release: October 12, 2022 – April 20, 2023

Living with Dad (French: Les filles de Dad) is a French animated television series based on the comic book series Dad by Nob. The series centers around four stepsisters and their father.

== Characters ==
=== Main ===
- Dad (voiced by Rolando Pablo Gutierrez) is the father of Ondine, Panda, Roxane and Berenice.
- Ondine (voiced by Crystal J. Lopez) has very long pink hair.
- Panda (voiced by Katherine Clare Clavelo) has long straight black hair and wears a large circular glasses and a dark sweater. She is the oldest of the four stepsisters.
- Roxane (voiced by Dana Spejh) has orange hair and wears a red hoodie.
- Berenice is a baby and is the youngest of the four stepsisters.

== Production ==
In June 2020, it was announced that the comic book series Dad by Nob would be adapted into an animated series for M6 Kids alongside another comic book series, Kid Lucky. Living with Dad is produced by Dupuis Edition & Audiovisuel alongside Belvision and Ellipsanime.

=== Animation ===
Angoulême-based animation studio Ellipse Studio Angoulême and Madlab Animations (a joint venture between Dupuis Edition & Audiovisuel's fellow animation subsidiary Ellipsanime Productions and Ankama Animations) handled animation services for the series alongside Dupuis Edition & Audiovisuel's in-house Belgian animation studio DreamWall.

== See also ==
- Média-Participations
