= Philippe Gildas =

French journalist (1935–2018)

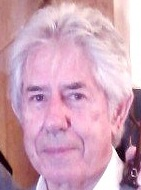
- Born: Philippe Leprêtre; 12 November 1935; Auray, France
- Died: 28 October 2018 (aged 82); Paris, France
- Resting place: Père Lachaise Cemetery
- Education: Centre de formation des journalistes (CFJ)
- Occupation: Journalist
- Years active: 1962–2018

Philippe Gildas (born Philippe Leprêtre; 12 November 1935 – 28 October 2018) was a French journalist.

== Biography ==
Beginning his career in 1962, Gildas became the director of information for an RTL radio station. Born as Philippe Lepêtre, he took the name Gildas as a pseudonym over the radio. In 1969, Gildas turned to French Public Radio and Television (ORTF). In 1972, he became editor in chief of ORTF, although it was dissolved in 1974. He was editor in chief at France Inter from 1973 to 1974, and then worked at Europe 1 from 1975 to 1986 as editor in chief and deputy director of information.

Gildas began working for Canal+ in 1985 as a director, and launched his own talk show, Gildas Direct. He left the show in 1987 to direct Nulle part ailleurs, and Philippe Risoli took over as director of the talk show. Nulle part ailleurs was a comedic talk show that took serious issues and put a humorous spin on them. Gildas won a 7 d'or award for the show in 1994 and 1997.

In 2001, Gildas was promoted to president of CNews after a deal with Canal+. In 2007, he launched Vivolta, a television network aimed at Baby boomers. In 2010, Gildas published an autobiography titled Comment réussir à la télévision quand on est petit, breton, avec de grandes oreilles ?. In 2018, Gildas made his final television appearance in the TV documentary La Télé des années 80 : les Dix Ans qui ont tout changé, aired on France Télévisions.

Philippe Gildas died on 28 October 2018 following a battle with cancer. He was buried on 5 November 2018 at the Père Lachaise Cemetery.
