= Tooncan =

Canadian animation studio

Tooncan Productions Inc.
- Formerly: Tooncan Productions, Inc.(1994-2004)
- Type: Animation studio
- Founded: 1994; 31 years ago
- Defunct: 2014; 11 years ago
- Fate: Closed
- Headquarters: Montreal, Quebec, Canada
- Key people: Paul Cadieux (co-founder)
- Services: Animation production
- Subsidiaries: Production Champion (defunct)

Tooncan was an animation studio based in Montreal, Quebec founded by Paul Cadieux. The company worked on TF1's The Bellflower Bunnies and Sylvain Chomet's The Triplets of Belleville.

== List of programmes ==
- Rotten Ralph (1996) (co-production with The Disney Channel)
- Not So Rotten Ralph (1996) (co-production with The Disney Channel)
- Rotten Ralph (1998–01) (co-production with Italtoons Corporation, Cosgrove Hall Films and BBC TV)
- Charley and Mimmo (1999–02) (co-production with Vip Toons, Cymax, Canal J, Nathan Entertainment and Les Armateurs)
- Oggy and the Cockroaches (2000–03) (co-production with France 3 and Gaumont Multimedia)
- Belphegor (2001) (co-production with KG Prince, France 2, France 3 and Les Armateurs)
- Iron Nose (2001) (co-production with Futurikon, Megafun Productions, Melusine Productions SA and Metrapole Production (M6)
- Snailympics (2001) (co-production with Truca Films)
- The New Adventures of Lucky Luke (2001–03) (co-production with Xilam Animation and Lucky Comics)
- Wombat City (2001) (co-production with Les Films de la Perrine, France 2, Beachmark Productions LLC and Carrere Group)
- Spaced Out (2002–03) (co-production with Canal+, Cartoon Network Europe and Alphanim)
- X-DuckX (2002–06) (co-production with Alphanim, France 3, Telepool, Soficanim, Young Distribution and Point Animation)
- Kaput & Zösky: The Ultimate Obliterators (2002–03) (co-production with Futurikon)
- Malo Korrigan (2002) (co-production with Futurikon, Ravensburger Film + TV, M6 and Canal J)
- Ratz (2003–04) (co-production with France 3 and Xilam Animation)
- Mica (2003) (co-production with Ricochets Productions S.A.R.L.)
- The Triplets of Belleville (2003) (co-production with France 3 Cinéma, BBC TV, Production Champion, Vivi Film, Les Armateurs and RGP France)
- Kitou (2003) (co-production with Dargaud Marina, TF1, Belvision and RTBF)
- Milo (2003) (co-production with Gertie, Rai Fiction, Les Films de la Perrine, Carrere Group and France 5)
- Cosmic Cowboys (2003–04) (co-production with Alphanim, Rai Fiction, Europool, Agogo Media, Gruppo Alcuni, LuxAnimation and Sofica France Télévision Images 2)
- 3 Gold Coins (2004)
- The Bellflower Bunnies (2004–10) (co-production with Big Cash, Euro Visual and TF1)
- Prudence Gumshoe (2004) (co-production with Films de la Perrine)
- The Boy (2004–05)
- The Adventures of Princess Sydney (2004) (co-production with Planlarge Enterprises Ltd and Greenfield Toons)
- Woofy (2004–05) (co-production with Alphanim)
- Billy and Buddy (2005) (co-production with Dargaud Marina and TF1)
- Tupu (2005) (co-production with Xilam Animation)
- Shaolin's Kids (2005) (co-production with Les Villains Garçons)
- Lili's Island (2005) (co-production with Teleimages Kids and Je Suis Bien Content)
- A Cat, a Cow and the Ocean (2006) (co-production with Futurikon, 2 Minutes, France 5 and Disney Television France)
- Zoé Kezako (2006) (co-production with TeamTO, TF1, TPS Jeunesse and Télétoon)
- Oscar and Spike (2008) (co-production with Les Vilains Garçons)
- Nelly and Caesar (2008) (co-production with Studio St-Antoine)
- Eo (2009)
- Fishtronaut (2009–15) (co-production with TV PinGuim (Brazil) and Discovery Kids Original Productions)
- Tempo Express (2010) (co-production with ZDF, Les Cartooneurs Associes and Fantasia Animation)
- Anatane: Saving the Children of Okura (2008 (pilot), 2018) (co-production with Les Films de la Perrine and France Télévisions)
