= List of Radiant episodes =

Radiant is a 2018 Japanese anime series based on French author Tony Valente's French comic book series of the same name, which is published in Japan by Asukashinsha. It follows the main protagonist, Seth, as he looks for the legendary Radiant in order to defeat creatures called Nemesis. The series is directed by Seiji Kishi and Daisei Fukuoka, and written by Makoto Uezu, with animation by studio Lerche. Character designs for the series are produced by Nozomi Kawano, and Masato Koda is composing the series' music.

The 21-episode anime series aired on NHK Educational TV from October 6, 2018, to February 23, 2019. It is based on volumes 1 through 4 of the manfra. The series is simulcast by Crunchyroll, with Funimation producing an English dub as it aired.

In the season finale, a 21-episode second season was announced. It premiered on October 2, 2019.

The series received a French dub which first aired on Game One in France on September 2, 2019.

Funimation's English dub of Radiant began airing on ABC Me in Australia starting on January 2, 2021.

== Series overview ==
Season	Episodes	Originally released	
Season	Episodes	First released	Last released
1	21	October 6, 2018	February 23, 2019
2	21	October 2, 2019	February 26, 2020

== Episode list ==
=== Season 1 (2018–19) ===
No.	Title (Note: All English episode titles are taken from Crunchyroll.)	Original release date	English air date
1	"The Young Sorcerer -Seth-"; Transliteration: "Mahōtsukai no shōnen -Seth-" (Japanese: 魔法使いの少年 -Seth-)	October 6, 2018	January 2, 2021
2	"True Courage -Bravery-"; Transliteration: "Hontō no yūki -Bravery-" (Japanese: 本当の勇気 -Bravery-)	October 13, 2018	January 9, 2021
3	"The Day of Departure -Alma-"; Transliteration: "Tabidachinohi -Alma-" (Japanese: 旅立ちの日 -Alma-)	October 20, 2018	January 16, 2021
4	"A Meeting in the Sky -Encounter-"; Transliteration: "Ōzora no deai -Encounter-" (Japanese: 大空の出会い -Encounter-)	October 27, 2018	January 23, 2021
5	"A Paradise of Wisdom and Hope -Artemis-"; Transliteration: "Eichi to kibō no rakuen -Artemis-" (Japanese: 英知と希望の楽園 -Artemis-)	November 3, 2018	January 30, 2021
6	"Drops of Friendship -Melie-"; Transliteration: "Yūjō no shizuku -Melie-" (Japanese: 友情の雫 -Mélie-)	November 10, 2018	February 6, 2021
7	"The Beast of the Underground Water System -Monster-"; Transliteration: "Chika suidō ni hisomu mono -Monster-" (Japanese: 地下水道に潜む者 -Monster-)	November 17, 2018	February 13, 2021
8	"Proof of Strength -Progress-"; Transliteration: "Tsuyo-sa no shōmei -Progress-" (Japanese: 強さの証明 -Progress-)	November 24, 2018	February 20, 2021
9	"Those Who Hunt Heretics -Inquisition-"; Transliteration: "Itan o karu-mono-tachi -Inquisition-" (Japanese: 異端を狩る者たち -Inquisition-)	December 1, 2018	February 27, 2021
10	"Broom of Memories -Memory-"; Transliteration: "Omoide no hōki -Memory-" (Japanese: 思い出の箒 -Memory-)	December 8, 2018	March 6, 2021
11	"The City That Roars Like Thunder -Rumble Town-"; Transliteration: "Gōon to kensō no machi -Rumble Town-" (Japanese: 轟音と喧騒の街 -Rumble Town-)	December 15, 2018	March 13, 2021
12	"The Shadow Lurking in the City -Darkness-"; Transliteration: "Machi ni sukuu yami -Darkness-" (Japanese: 街に巣食う闇 -Darkness-)	December 22, 2018	March 20, 2021
13	"Overture of Turbulence -Storm-"; Transliteration: "Dōran jokyoku -Storm-" (Japanese: 動乱序曲 -Storm-)	December 29, 2018	March 27, 2021
14	"The Bell Tolls the Sound of Destruction -Catastrophe-"; Transliteration: "Hōkai no kanenone -Catastrophe-" (Japanese: 崩壊の鐘の音 -Catastrophe-)	January 5, 2019	April 3, 2021
15	"With Fists Like Shooting Stars -Burst-"; Transliteration: "Sono kobushi wa ryuusei no you ni -Burst-" (Japanese: その拳は流星のように -Burst-)	January 12, 2019	April 10, 2021
16	"Fly High and Pierce Through the Storm -Rising-"; Transliteration: "Arashi ugachi maiagare -Rising-" (Japanese: 嵐穿ち舞い上がれ -Rising-)	January 19, 2019	April 17, 2021
17	"To Stop the Sound of the Wind -Serenade-"; Transliteration: "Ima kazenone o tomete -Serenade-" (Japanese: いま風の音を止めて -Serenade-)	January 26, 2019	April 24, 2021
18	"The Light That Follows the Darkness -Awakening-"; Transliteration: "Yami no ato no hikari -Awakening-" (Japanese: 闇のあとの光 -Awakening-)	February 2, 2019	May 1, 2021
19	"The World That You Changed -Relief-"; Transliteration: "Kimi ga kaeta sekai -Relief-" (Japanese: 君が変えた世界 -Relief-)	February 9, 2019	May 8, 2021
20	"Omen -Sign-"; Transliteration: "Yochō -Sign-" (Japanese: 予兆 -Sign-)	February 16, 2019	May 15, 2021
21	"In Search of the Future -Utopia-"; Transliteration: "Mirai o motomete -Utopia-" (Japanese: 未来を求めて -Utopia-)	February 23, 2019	May 22, 2021

=== Season 2 (2019–20) ===
No. overall	No. in season	Title	Original release date	English air date
22	1	"Toward a New Adventure -Overture-"; Transliteration: "Aratanaru bōken e -Overture-" (Japanese: 新たなる冒険へ -Overture-)	October 2, 2019	May 29, 2021
23	2	"An Encounter in the Rain -Mist-"; Transliteration: "Kirisame no Kaikō -Mist-" (Japanese: 霧雨の邂逅(かいこう) -Mist-)	October 9, 2019	June 5, 2021
24	3	"The City of Knights -Caislean Merlin-"; Transliteration: "Kishi no To -Caislean Merlin-" (Japanese: 騎士の都 -Caislean Merlin-)	October 16, 2019	June 12, 2021
25	4	"The Bringer of Calamity -Dullahan-"; Transliteration: "Wazawai wo yobu mono -Dullahan-" (Japanese: 災いをよぶ者 -Dullahan-)	October 23, 2019	June 19, 2021
26	5	"Silent Rain, Distant Hearts -Rain-"; Transliteration: "Amaoto shizukani kokoro wa tōku -Rain-" (Japanese: 雨音静かに心は遠く -Rain-)	October 30, 2019	June 26, 2021
27	6	"His Name Is -Diabal-"; Transliteration: "Ka no Mono no Nawa -Diabal-" (Japanese: 彼(か)の者の名は -Diabal-)	November 6, 2019	July 3, 2021
28	7	"The Spectre Battle -Spectre-"; Transliteration: "Supekutoru kōbō-sen -Spectre-" (Japanese: スペクトル攻防戦 -Spectre-)	November 13, 2019	July 10, 2021
29	8	"Seth in the Forest of Time -Caillte-"; Transliteration: "Toki no Mori no Seto -Caillte-" (Japanese: 時の森のセト -Caillte-)	November 20, 2019	July 17, 2021
30	9	"The Palace of Schemes -Palace-"; Transliteration: "Bōryaku no Ōkyū -Palace-" (Japanese: 謀略の王宮 -Palace-)	November 27, 2019	July 24, 2021
31	10	"The Qualifications of a Knight -Quality-"; Transliteration: "Kishi no Shikaku -Quality-" (Japanese: 騎士の資格 -Quality-)	December 4, 2019	July 31, 2021
32	11	"Now, Feel the World -Resonance-"; Transliteration: "Ima Sekai wo Kanjite -Resonance-" (Japanese: いま世界を感じて -Resonance-)	December 11, 2019	August 7, 2021
33	12	"The Truth Is Like a Curse -Ocoho-"; Transliteration: "Shinjitsu wa Noroi no Yō ni -Ocoho-" (Japanese: 真実は呪いのように -Ocoho-)	December 18, 2019	August 14, 2021
34	13	"Your Decision -Knighthood-"; Transliteration: "Kimi no Ketsui -Knighthood-" (Japanese: 君の決意 -Knighthood-)	December 25, 2019	August 21, 2021
35	14	"The Final Battlefield -Battlefield-"; Transliteration: "Kessen no Daichi -Battlefield-" (Japanese: 決戦の大地 -Battlefield-)	January 8, 2020	August 28, 2021
36	15	"Led to the Abyss by a Melody of Death -Harmonizium-"; Transliteration: "Naraku e Izanau Horobi no Shirabe -Harmonizium-" (Japanese: 奈落へ誘(いざな)う滅びの調べ -Harmonizium-)	January 15, 2020	September 4, 2021
37	16	"The Light of Life is Extinguished -Tragedy-"; Transliteration: "Kie Yuku Inochi no Tomoshibi -Tragedy-" (Japanese: 消えゆく命の灯火(ともしび) -Tragedy-)	January 22, 2020	September 11, 2021
38	17	"The Black Dragon Descends -Pen Draig-"; Transliteration: "Kuroki Ryū wa Maiorita -Pen Draig-" (Japanese: 黒き竜は舞い降りた -Pen Draig-)	January 29, 2020	September 18, 2021
39	18	"The Will of the People Shines Bright -Resistance-"; Transliteration: "Kagayaku wa Hito no Ishi -Resistance-" (Japanese: 輝くは人の意思 -Resistance-)	February 5, 2020	September 25, 2021
40	19	"I Can't Hear Your Voice -Myrddin-"; Transliteration: "Kiminokoe ga Kikoenai -Myrddin-" (Japanese: 君の声が聞こえない -Myrddin-)	February 12, 2020	October 2, 2021
41	20	"A Bouquet of Flowers for This Land -Fantasia-"; Transliteration: "Kono Daichi ni Hanataba o -Fantasia-" (Japanese: この大地に花束を -Fantasia-)	February 19, 2020	October 9, 2021
42	21	"The Future is With You -Eternity-"; Transliteration: "Mirai wa Kimi to Tomoni -Eternity-" (Japanese: 未来は君とともに -Eternity-)	February 26, 2020	October 16, 2021

== See also ==
- List of Radiant volumes
