= 2015 in anime =

Events in 2015 in anime.

== Awards ==
- 9th Seiyu Awards (held in 2015, awarded works from 2014)
- 10th Seiyu Awards (held in 2016, awarded works from 2015)

== Conventions ==
- January 16–18 - Otakon Vegas 2015
- March - AnimeJapan 2015

== Releases ==
=== Films ===
List of anime film releases that debuts through theater screening from January 1 - December 31, 2015.

Release date	Title	Studio	Director	Running Time (minutes)	Notes	Ref
January 9	Psycho-Pass: The Movie	Production I.G	Naoyoshi Shiotani			
January 31	Arpeggio of Blue Steel -Ars Nova DC-	Sanzigen	Seiji Kishi		First Arpeggio of Blue Steel anime film. Compilation of the TV series Arpeggio of Blue Steel -Ars Nova- with extra scenes.	
February 20	The Case of Hana & Alice	Steve N' Steven	Shunji Iwai			
March 6	Knights of Sidonia	Polygon Pictures	Kobun Shizuno		Compilation	
March 7	Doraemon: Nobita's Space Heroes	Shin-Ei Animation	Yoshihiro Osugi		Doraemon: Nobita no Space Heroes	
March 7	PriPara the Movie: Eeeeveryone, Assemble! Prism Tours	Tatsunoko Production	Masakazu Hishida			
March 13	Shimajirō to Ōkina Ki	Benesse Corporation	Isamu Hirabayashi	60	Shimajiro and the Mother Tree, the third Shimajiro live action Anime film. Compilation of anime television Shimajiro	
March 14	Beyond the Boundary: I'll Be Here – Past	Kyoto Animation	Taichi Ichidate		Compilation of anime television Beyond the Boundary	
March 14	Pretty Cure All Stars: Spring Carnival♪	Toei Animation				
April 5	Tamayura: Sotsugyō Shashin Dai-1-bu Me -Kizashi-	TYO Animations	Junichi Sato	51	Tamayura: Graduation Photos Part I: Sprout. Tamayura sequel. First film of the four-part Tamayura movie series.	
April 12	Le Labyrinthe de la Grisaia	8-Bit	Tensho	60	Based on the visual novel with the same name	
April 18	Detective Conan: Sunflowers of Inferno	TMS/V1 Studio	Kobun Shizuno		19th Detective Conan film.	
April 18	Crayon Shin-Chan: My Moving Story! Cactus Large Attack!	Shin-Ei Animation	Masakazu Hashimoto			
April 18	Dragon Ball Z: Resurrection 'F'	Toei Animation	Tadayoshi Yamamuro	93	Dragon Ball Z: Fukkatsu no F, 19th Dragon Ball film	
April 25	Beyond the Boundary: I'll Be Here – Future	Kyoto Animation	Taichi Ichidate		An original story set one year after the anime television Beyond the Boundary	
May 9	Miss Hokusai	Production I.G	Keiichi Hara			
May 23	New Initial D the Movie	Sanzigen; Liden Films	Masamitsu Hidaka	62	Legend 2: - Racer. The second part of the three-part film.	
May 23	Tensai Bakavon: Yomigaeru Flanders no Inu	DLE	FROGMAN		Tensai Bakavon: The Resurrection of The Dog of Flanders in English	
June 5	Typhoon Noruda	Studio Colorido	Yōjirō Arai		Taifū no Noruda in Japanese	
June 12	Yowamushi Pedal Re:ROAD	TMS Entertainment	Osamu Nabeshima		Compilation film of Yowamushi Pedal GRANDE Road	
June 13	Love Live! The School Idol Movie	Sunrise	Takahiko Kyōgoku			
June 20	Kōkaku Kidōtai Shin Gekijōban	Production I.G	Kazuya Nomura		Ghost in the Shell: New Movie in English	
June 25	Attack on Titan Part II: Wings of Freedom	Wit Studio	Tetsuro Araki		Compilation	
July 3	Haikyu!! the Movie: Ending and Beginning	Production I.G			Compilation. Gekijō-ban Haikyu!! Owari to Hajimari in Japanese.	
July 4	Sinbad: Sora Tobu Hime to Himitsu no Shima	Nippon Animation; Shirogumi	Shinpei Miyashita		Sinbad: The Flying Princess and the Secret Island in English	
July 11	The Boy and the Beast	Studio Chizu	Mamoru Hosoda			
July 18	The Archdjinni of the Rings: Hoopa	OLM, Inc.	Kunihiko Yuyama		18th Pokémon anime movie and the second movie in the XY Series.	
July 18	Gekijōban Meiji Tokyo Renka: Yumihari no Serenade	Studio Deen	Hiroshi Watanabe		Film Version Meiji Tokyo Love Song: Crescent Moon's Serenade	
August 22	Aikatsu! Music Award: Minna de Shō o MoraimaSHOW!	BN Pictures	Shinya Watada			
August 22	Date A Live: Mayuri Judgement	Production IMS	Keitaro Motonaga	72		
August 22	Hikawa Maru Monogatari	Mushi Production	Shunji Ōga	90		
August 28	Yowamushi Pedal: The Movie	TMS/8PAN	Osamu Nabeshima		Gekijōban Yowamushi Pedal in Japanese	
August 29	Tamayura: Sotsugyō Shashin Dai-2-bu -Hibiki-	TYO Animations	Junichi Sato	52	Second film of the four-part Tamayura movie series.	
September 19	The Anthem of the Heart	A-1 Pictures	Tatsuyuki Nagai		Kokoro ga Sakebitagatterun Da. in Japanese Anthem of the Heart -Beautiful Word, Beautiful World- is the complete English name	
September 18	Haikyu!! the Movie: Winners and Losers	Production I.G			Compilation. Gekijō-ban Haikyu!! Shōsha to Haisha in Japanese.	
October 2	The Empire of Corpses	Wit Studio	Ryoutarou Makihara		Project Itoh film Shisha no Teikoku in Japanese	
October 3	Arpeggio of Blue Steel -Ars Nova Cadenza-	Sanzigen	Seiji Kishi		Second Arpeggio of Blue Steel anime film. New story based on the manga.	
November 13	Harmony	Studio 4°C	Takashi Nakamura, Michael Arias		Project Itoh film	
November 21	Digimon Adventure tri: Saikai	Toei Animation	Keitaro Motonaga		First film of Digimon Adventure tri. film series	
November 28	Tamayura: Sotsugyō Shashin Dai-3-bu -Akogare-	TYO Animations	Junichi Sato	51	Third film of the four-part Tamayura movie series.	
December 23	Chibi Maruko-chan: Italia Kara Kita Shōnen	Nippon Animation	Jun Takagi	94		

=== Television series ===
A list of anime television series that debuted between January 1 and December 31, 2015.

First Run Start and End Dates	Title	Eps	Studio	Director	Alternate Title	Ref
January 4 – March 22	Absolute Duo	12	8-Bit	Atsushi Nakayama		
January 4 – March 29	Minna Atsumare! Falcom Gakuen SC	13	Chara-ani; Dax Production	Pippuya		
January 4 – March 28	Tantei Kageki Milky Holmes TD	12	J.C. Staff; Nomad	Hiroshi Nishikiori		
January 5 – March 30	Kamisama Kiss◎	12	TMS/V1 Studio	Akitaro Daichi		
January 5 – March 31	Yurikuma Arashi	12	Silver Link	Kunihiko Ikuhara		
January 6 – March 24	Cute High Earth Defense Club Love!	12	Diomedéa	Shinji Takamatsu	Binan Kōkō Chikyū Bōei-bu Love! Handsome High School Earth Defense Club Love!	
January 7 – March 25	Kantai Collection	12	Diomedéa	Keizō Kusakawa	KanColle	
January 7 – March 25	Miritari!	12	Creators in Pack	Hiroshi Kimura		
January 7 – March 25	The Testament of Sister New Devil	12	Production IMS	Hisashi Saito	Shinmai Maō no Testament	
January 8 – April 15	Fafner in the Azure: Exodus	13	XEBECzwei	Takashi Noto; Nobuyoshi Habara	Fafner EXODUS; Sōkyū no Fafner Exodus	
January 8 – March 26	Saekano: How to Raise a Boring Girlfriend	12	A-1 Pictures	Kanta Kamei	Saenai Heroine no Sodatekata	
January 8 – March 26	Tokyo Ghoul √A	12	Pierrot	Shuhei Morita		
January 8 – March 26	Unlimited Fafnir	12	Diomedéa	Keizō Kusakawa	Jūō Mujin no Fafnir	
January 9 – June 19	Assassination Classroom	22	Lerche	Seiji Kishi	Ansatsu Kyōshitsu	
January 9 – March 27	Gourmet Girl Graffiti	12	Shaft	Naoyuki Tatsuwa; Akiyuki Shinbo	Kōfuku Graffiti; Happy Cooking Graffiti	
January 9 – March 27	Death Parade	12	Madhouse	Yuzuru Tachikawa		
January 10 – March 28	Dog Days''	12	Seven Arcs Pictures	Junji Nishimura; Kikuchi Katsuya	Dog Days Double Dash	
January 10 – March 26, 2016	Durarara!!×2	36	Shuka	Takahiro Omori		
January 10 – July 1	Kuroko's Basketball (season 3)	25	Production I.G	Shunsuke Tada	Kuroko no Basket	
January 10 – April 4	Shōnen Hollywood – Holly Stage for 50	13	Zexcs	Toshimasa Kuroyanagi		
January 10 – April 11	The IDOLM@STER Cinderella Girls	13	A-1 Pictures	Noriko Takao		
January 10 – March 28	The Rolling Girls	12	Wit Studio	Kotomi Deai		
January 11 – March 29	Maria the Virgin Witch	12	Production I.G	Gorō Taniguchi	Junketsu no Maria	
January 11 – March 29	World Break: Aria of Curse for a Holy Swordsman	12	Diomedéa	Inagaki Takayuki	Seiken Tsukai no World Break	
January 11 – March 29	Samurai Warriors	12	Tezuka Productions; TYO Animations	Kōjin Ochi	Sengoku Musou	
January 11 – March 29	Yatterman Night	12	Tatsunoko Production	Tatsuya Yoshihara	Yoru no Yatterman	
January 23 – March 27	Isuca	10	Arms	Akira Iwanaga		
February 1 – January 31, 2016	Go! Princess PreCure	50	Toei Animation	Yuta Tanaka		
March 31 – February 23, 2016	Omakase! Miracle Cat-dan	32	OLM, Inc.	Mitsuo Hashimoto		
April 1 –	Battle Spirits Burning Soul		BN Pictures	Hajime Yatate		
October 3, 2014 – June 25, 2015	I Can't Understand What My Husband Is Saying	26	Seven	Shinpei Nagai	Danna ga Nani o Itteiru ka Wakaranai Ken	
April 2 – June 25	My Teen Romantic Comedy SNAFU TOO!	13	Feel	Kei Oikawa	Yahari Ore no Seishun Love Come wa Machigatteiru. Zoku	
April 2 – June 25	Re-Kan!	13	Pierrot+	Masashi Kudo		
April 3 – June 26	Is It Wrong to Try to Pick Up Girls in a Dungeon?	12	J.C. Staff	Yoshiki Yamakawa	DanMachi; Dungeon ni Deai o Motomeru no wa Machigatteiru Darō ka	
April 3 – September 25	Food Wars!: Shokugeki no Soma	24	J.C. Staff	Yoshitomo Yonetani		
April 3 – June 19	Magical Girl Lyrical Nanoha ViVid	12	A-1 Pictures	Yuuki Itoh	Mahō Shōjo Lyrical Nanoha ViVid	
April 3 – July 17	The Disappearance of Nagato Yuki-chan	16	Satelight	Jun'ichi Wada	Nagato Yuki-chan no Shōshitsu	
April 4 – October 4	Blood Blockade Battlefront	12	Bones	Rie Matsumoto	Kekkai Sensen	
April 4 – June 20	Gunslinger Stratos: The Animation	12	A-1 Pictures	Shinpei Ezaki		
April 4 – June 20	High School DxD BorN	12	TNK	Tetsuya Yanagisawa		
April 4 – December 26	Jewelpet: Magical Change	39	Studio Deen	Nobuhiro Kondo		
April 4 – June 27	Plastic Memories	13	Doga Kobo	Yoshiyuki Fujiwara		
April 4 – September 20	Rin-ne	25	Brain's Base	Seiki Sugawara	Kyōkai no Rinne; Rinne of the Boundary	
April 4 – June 20	Seraph of the End	12	Wit Studio	Daisuke Tokudo	Owari no Seraph	
April 4 – September 26	Ultimate Otaku Teacher	24	A-1 Pictures	Masato Sato	Denpa Kyōshi	
April 4 – June 28	Uta no Prince-sama: Maji Love Revolutions	13	A-1 Pictures	Yuu Kou; Yūki Ukai		
April 5 – September 20	Baby Steps (season 2)	25	Pierrot	Masahiko Murata		
April 5 – March 27, 2016	Duel Masters Versus Revolution	51	Ascension	Shinobu Sasaki		
April 5 – June 21	Hello!! Kin-iro Mosaic	12	Studio Gokumi	Tensho		
April 5 – June 21	Rainy Cocoa	12	EMT Squared	Tomomi Mochizuki	Ameiro Cocoa	
April 5 – June 21	Show by Rock!!	12	Bones	Takahiro Ikezoe		
April 5 – September 27	The Heroic Legend of Arslan	25	Liden Films Sanzigen	Noriyuki Abe	Arslan Senki	
April 5 – June 14	Ghost in the Shell: Arise	10	Production I.G	Kazuchika Kise		
April 6 –	Ace of Diamond: Second Season		Madhouse; Production I.G	Mitsuyuki Masuhara		
April 6 – June 22	Mikagura School Suite	12	Doga Kobo	Tarō Iwasaki	Mikagura Gakuen Kumikyoku	
April 7 – June 23	Teekyu (season 4)	12	Millepensee	Shin Itagaki		
April 7 – June 30	Sound! Euphonium	13	Kyoto Animation	Tatsuya Ishihara	Hibike! Euphonium	
April 8 –	Gintama°		BN Pictures	Chizuru Miyawaki		
April 8 – September 23	My Love Story!!	24	Madhouse	Morio Asaka	Ore Monogatari!! Oremonogatari!!	
April 8 – June 10	Triage X	10	Xebec	Akio Takami Takao Kato		
April 9 – June 25	Etotama	12	Shirogumi; Encourage Films	Fumitoshi Oizaki; Takamitsu Hirakawa		
April 9 – June 25	Punch Line	12	MAPPA	Yutaka Uemura		
April 9 – June 25	Urawa no Usagi-chan	12	A-Real	Mitsuyuki Ishibashi		
April 9 – June 24	Wish Upon the Pleiades	12	Gainax	Shōji Saeki	Hōkago no Pleiades	
April 10 – June 26	Knights of Sidonia: Battle for Planet Nine	12	Polygon Pictures	Hiroyuki Seshita		
April 10 – June 26	Nisekoi:	12	Shaft	Naoyuki Tatsuwa; Akiyuki Shinbo; Yukihiro Miyamoto		
April 11 – March 26, 2016	Future Card Buddyfight 100	50	OLM, Inc. Xebec	Shigetaka Ikeda		
April 12 – June 28	Yamada-kun and the Seven Witches	12	Liden Films	Tomoki Takuno	Yamada-kun to 7-nin no Majo	
April 19 – June 21	The Eden of Grisaia	10	8-Bit	Tensho	Le Eden de la Grisaia	
July 1 – September 27	Gangsta.	12	Manglobe	Shukou Murase		
July 2 – December 24	Aquarion Logos	26	Satelight; C2C	Eiichi Sato		
July 2 – September 17	Castle Town Dandelion	12	Production IMS	Noriaki Akitaya	Jōkamachi no Dandelion	
July 2 – September 17	Chaos Dragon: Sekiryū Sen'eki	12	Silver Link; Connect	Masato Matsune		
July 2 – September 17	My Wife is the Student Council President	12	Seven	Hiroyuki Furukawa	Okusama ga Seitokaichō!	
July 2 – September 17	Rampo Kitan: Game of Laplace	11	Lerche	Seiji Kishi		
July 3 – September 18	Aoharu x Machinegun	12	Brains Base	Hideaki Nakano	Aoharu x Kikanjū	
July 3 – September 25	Classroom Crisis	13	Lay-duce	Kenji Nagasaki		
July 3 – September 18	Gate: Jieitai Kanochi nite, Kaku Tatakaeri	12	A-1 Pictures	Takahiko Kyōgoku		
July 3 – September 25	Miss Monochrome (season 2)	13	Liden Films; Sanzigen	Yoshiaki Iwasaki		
July 3 – September 25	Senki Zesshō Symphogear GX	13	Encourage Films, Satelight	Katsumi Ono		
July 3 – December 25	Ushio and Tora	26	MAPPA; Studio VOLN	Satoshi Nishimura	Ushio to Tora	
July 3 – September 25	Wakaba Girl	13	Nexus	Seiji Watanabe		
July 3 – September 25	Wooser's Hand-to-Mouth Life: Mugen-hen	13	Sanzigen	Seiji Mizushima		
July 4 – September 26	Charlotte	13	P.A. Works	Yoshiyuki Asai		
July 4 – September 26	Gatchaman Crowds insight	13	Tatsunoko Production	Kenji Nakamura		
July 4 – September 19	Rokka: Braves of the Six Flowers	12	Passione	Takeo Takahashi	Rokka no Yūsha	
July 4 – September 19	Shimoneta	12	J.C. Staff	Youhei Suzuki	Shimoneta to Iu Gainen ga Sonzai Shinai Taikutsu na Sekai	
July 4 – December 26	Working!!!	14	A-1 Pictures	Yumi Kamakura		
July 5 – March 25, 2018	Dragon Ball Super	131	Toei Animation	Kimitoshi Chioka		
July 5 – September 20	Wakakozake	12	Office DCI	Minoru Yamaoka		
July 6 – September 21	Snow White with the Red Hair	12	Bones	Masahiro Andō	Akagami no Shirayukihime	
July 6 – September 28	My Monster Secret	13	TMS Entertainment	Yasutaka Yamamoto	Jitsu wa Watashi wa	
July 6 – September 21	Million Doll	11	Asahi Production	Keiichiro Kawaguchi		
July 6 – September 21	Non Non Biyori Repeat	12	Silver Link	Shinya Kawamo		
July 7 – September 22	Bikini Warriors	12	Feel	Naoyuki Kuzuya		
July 7 – September 22	Monster Musume	12	Lerche	Tatsuya Yoshihara	Monster Musume no Iru Nichijō; Everyday Life with Monster Girls	
July 7 – September 22	Teekyu (season 5)	12	Millepensee	Shin Itagaki		
July 7 – September 29	Overlord	13	Madhouse	Naoyuki Itō		
July 7 – September 29	Seiyu's Life!	13	Gonzo	Hiroshi Ikehata	Sore ga Seiyū!	
July 7 – October 29	To Love-Ru Darkness 2nd	14	Xebec	Atsushi Ootsuki	To Love-Ru –Trouble- Darkness 2nd	
July 8 – September 23	Junjō Romantica 3	12	Studio Deen	Chiaki Kon		
July 8 – September 23	Sky Wizards Academy	12	Diomedéa	Takayuki Inagaki	Kūsen Madōshi Kōhosei no Kyōkan	
July 8 – September 23	Suzakinishi the Animation	12	Feel	Yoshihiro Hiramine		
July 9 – September 24	Danchigai	12	Creators in Pack	Hiroshi Kimura		
July 9 – September 26	Fate/kaleid liner Prisma Illya 2wei Herz!	10	Silver Link	Shin Ōnuma; Masato Jinbo		
July 9 – September 24	Himouto! Umaru-chan	12	Doga Kobo	Masahiko Ohta	Himōto! Umaru-chan	
July 9 – September 24	School-Live!	12	Lerche	Masaomi Ando	Gakkō Gurashi!	
July 11 – September 26	Prison School	12	J.C. Staff	Tsutomu Mizushima		
July 12 – March 26, 2016	God Eater	13	Ufotable	Takayuki Hirao		
July 13 – September 28	Makura no Danshi	12	Assez Finaud Fabric; Feel			
August 30 – November 30	Lupin the 3rd Part IV: The Italian Adventure	26	Telecom Animation Film	Kazuhide Tomonaga; Yūichirō Yano		
September 23 – December 9	Diabolik Lovers More, Blood	12	Zexcs	Risako Yoshida		
October 1 –	Kami-sama Minarai: Himitsu no Cocotama		OLM	Norio Nitta	God Apprentices: Secretive Cocotama	
October 1 –	Kyo-fu! Zombie Neko		Kachidoki Studio	Hiroshi Namiki		
October 1 – December 17	Lance N' Masques	12	Studio Gokumi	Kyōhei Ishiguro		
October 1 – December 17	Young Black Jack	12	Tezuka Productions	Mitsuko Kase		
October 2 – December 25	Hacka Doll the Animation	13	Creators in Pack; Studio Trigger	Ikuo Geso		
October 2 – March 25, 2016	Heavy Object	24	J.C. Staff	Takashi Watanabe		
October 2 – December 25	Kagewani	13	Tomovies	Tomoya Takashima		
October 2 – December 18	Miss Monochrome (season 3)	13	Liden Films; Sanzigen	Yoshiaki Iwasaki		
October 3 – June 18, 2016	The Asterisk War: The Academy City of the Water	24	A-1 Pictures	Kenji Seto	Gakusen Toshi Asterisk	
October 3 –	Fafner in the Azure: Exodus (2nd season)	13	XEBECzwei		Fafner in the Azure: –EXODUS-	
October 3 – March 27, 2016	Haikyū!! (season 2)	25	Production I.G	Susumu Mitsunaka		
October 3 – December 26	K: Return of Kings	13	GoHands	Shingo Suzuki		
October 3 – March 26, 2016	Kindaichi Shōnen no Jikenbo R	22	Toei Animation	Yoko Ikeda	The File of Young Kindaichi Returns	
October 3 – March 26, 2016	Lovely Muco (season 3)	25	DLE	ROMANoV HiGA	Itoshi no Mūko	
October 3 – December 25	Noragami Aragoto	13	Bones	Kotaro Tamura		
October 3 – December 19	Chivalry of a Failed Knight	12	Silver Link; Nexus	Shin Ōnuma; Jin Tamamura	Rakudai Kishi no Cavalry	
October 3 – March 26, 2016	Utawarerumono: Itsuwari no Kamen	25	White Fox	Keitaro Motonaga	Utawarerumono: The False Mask	
October 4 – December 27	Rainy Cocoa, Welcome to Rainy Color	12	EMT Squared	Kazuomi Koga	Ameiro Cocoa Rainy color e Yōkoso!	
October 4 – December 20	Attack on Titan: Junior High	12	Production I.G	Yoshihide Ibata	Shingeki! Kyojin Chūgakkō	
October 4 – December 20	Comet Lucifer	12	8-Bit	Yasuhito Kikuchi; Atsushi Nakayama		
October 4 – December 27	Concrete Revolutio	13	Bones	Seiji Mizushima	Concrete Revolutio: Chōjin Gensō	
October 4 – December 20	Komori-san Can't Decline	12	Artland	Kenichi Imaizumi	Komori-san wa Kotowarenai!	
October 4 – March 27, 2016	Mobile Suit Gundam: Iron-Blooded Orphans	25	Sunrise	Tatsuyuki Nagai	Kidō Senshi Gundam: Tekketsu no Orphans	
October 4 –	Owarimonogatari		Shaft	Akiyuki Simbo		
October 4 – December 27	Onsen Yōsei Hakone-chan	13	Asahi Production; Production Reed	Takeyuki Yanase		
October 5 –	High School Star Musical		C-Station	Shunsuke Tada	Star-Mu	
October 5 – December 21	One-Punch Man	12	Madhouse	Shingo Natsume		
October 5 – December 25	Star-Myu	12	C-Station	Shunsuke Tada		
October 5 – December 21	Yuruyuri San Hai!	12	TYO Animations	Hiroyuki Hata		
October 6 – April 5, 2016	Shin Atashin'chi	26	Shin-Ei Animation	Ogura Hirofumi		
October 6 – December 22	Aria the Scarlet Ammo AA	12	Doga Kobo	Takashi Kawabata	Hidan no Aria AA	
October 6 –	DD Fist of the North Star		Doga Kobo	Akitaro Daichi	DD Hokuto no Ken	
October 6 – December 22	Hokuto no Ken: Ichigo Aji	12	Ajia-do Animation Works	Mankyū		
October 6 – December 22	Teekyu (season 6)	12	Millepensee	Shin Itagaki		
October 6 –	JK Meshi!		Kyotoma, Office Noble	Huzituka		
October 6 – March 28, 2016	Mr. Osomatsu	25	Studio Pierrot	Yoichi Fujita		
October 7 – December 23	AntiMagic Academy "The 35th Test Platoon"	12	Silver Link	Tomoyuki Kawamura	Tai-Madō Gakuen 35 Shiken Shōtai	
October 7 – December 23	Beautiful Bones: Sakurako's Investigation	12	TROYCA	Makoto Katō	A Corpse is Buried Under Sakurako's Feet; Sakurako-san no Ashimoto ni wa Shitai ga Umatteiru	
October 7 – December 23	Dance with Devils	12	Brain's Base	Ai Yoshimura		
October 7 – December 23	Magical Somera-chan	12	Seven	Itsuki Imazaki	Fushigi na Somera-chan	
October 7 – December 23	Shomin Sample	12	Silver Link	Masato Jinbo	Ore ga Ojō-sama Gakkō ni "Shomin Sample" Toshite Rachirareta Ken	
October 7 – January 27, 2016	Tantei Team KZ Jiken Note	16	Signal.MD	Kazuya Ichikawa		
October 8 – December 17	Subete ga F ni Naru	11	A-1 Pictures	Mamoru Kanbe	The Perfect Insider; Everything Becomes F	
October 9 – April 1, 2016	Garo: Crimson Moon	24	MAPPA	Atsushi Wakabayashi	Garo: Guren no Tsuki	
October 9 – December 11	The Testament of Sister New Devil BURST	10	Production IMS	Hisashi Saito	Shinmai Maō no Testament BURST	
October 10 – December 26	Is the Order a Rabbit??	12	Kinema Citrus; White Fox	Hiroyuki Hashimoto	Gochūmon wa Usagi Desu ka??	
October 10 – December 26	Seraph of the End: Battle in Nagoya	12	Wit Studio	Daisuke Tokudo	Owari no Seraph	
October 10 – December 26	Valkyrie Drive: Mermaid	12	Arms	Hiraku Kaneko		
October 11 – March 27, 2016	Brave Beats	22	BN Pictures	Yūta Murano		
October 11 – April 10, 2016	Cardfight!! Vanguard G: GIRS Crisis	26	TMS Entertainment	Yui Umemoto		
October 12 – December 28	Ani Tore! EX	12	Rising Force	Atsushi Nigorikawa		

=== Original net animation ===
List of streamed anime series debuts from January 1, 2015 through December 31, 2015

Release Start Date	Title	Studio	Director	Notes	Ref
February 13	Comical Psychosomatic Medicine	For All	Hirofumi Ogura		
April 16	Ninja Slayer From Animation	Trigger	Akira Amemiya		

=== OVA/OAV ===
List of anime that are debuted as DVD, Blu-ray, and other media releases in 2015.

Release date	Title	Eps	Studio	Director	Notes	Ref
January 30	Twin Angel: Kyun Tokimeki Paradise!!	2	J.C. Staff	Yoshiaki Iwasaki		
February 23	Hōzuki no Reitetsu	3	Wit Studio	Hiro Kaburaki	2nd and 3rd episodes released dates May 22 and August 21, respectively	
February 25	Exodus! Episode 1: Exit Tokyo	1	P.A. Works	Tsutomu Mizushima	Shirobako Specials; 25 mins running time	
February 28	Mobile Suit Gundam: The Origin I - Blue-Eyed Casval	1	Sunrise	Yoshikazu Yasuhiko, Takashi Imanishi	Premiered on theater screening February 15; 63 mins running time	
March 6	Shōwa Genroku Rakugo Shinjū	1	Studio Deen	Mamoru Hatakeyama	Part 1	
March 26	Senran Kagura: Estival Versus – Festival Eve Full of Swimsuits	1	Hoods Entertainment	Shigeru Ueda	Bundled with the PlayStation 4 edition of the Senran Kagura: Estival Versus game's Nyuu Nyuu DX Pack Premium	
March 10	Chaika - The Coffin Princess	1	Bones	Soichi Masui	Unaired original episode 24 mins running time	
May 30	Haiyore! Nyaruko-san F	1	Xebec	Tsuyoshi Nagasawa	Premieres on theaters	
June 21	The Third Girls Aerial Squad Episode 1	1	P.A. Works	Tsutomu Mizushima	Shirobako Specials	
January 22	The Testament of Sister New Devil	1	Production IMS	Hisashi Saito		
April 9	Attack on Titan: No Regrets	1	Wit Studio	Tetsuro Araki	Shingeki no Kyojin: Kuinaki Sentaku in Japanese; Episode 2	
August 7	Shōwa Genroku Rakugo Shinjū	1	Studio Deen	Mamoru Hatakeyama	Part 2	
August 26	Isuca	10	Arms	Akira Iwanaga	Unaired Episode 11 of the anime series	
October 17	Cyborg 009 Vs. Devilman	3	Bee Media, Actas	Jun Kawagoe	Received a two-week limited theatrical release.	
October 26	The Disappearance of Nagato Yuki-chan	1	Satelight	Jun'ichi Wada	25 mins running time	
October 31	Mobile Suit Gundam: The Origin II - Artesia's Sorrow	1	Sunrise	Yoshikazu Yasuhiko, Takashi Imanishi		
November 25	Strike the Blood	2	Silver Link; Connect	Takao Sano, Hideyo Yamamoto		
December 9	The Unresurrected Phoenix	1	TNK	Tetsuya Yanagisawa	High School DxD unaired episode 24 mins running time	
December 25	Tokyo Ghoul: Jack	1	Pierrot	Tadahito Matsubayashi		

== Highest-grossing films ==
The top ten anime films of 2015 by worldwide gross are as follows:

Rank	Title	Gross	Ref.
1	Dragon Ball Z: Resurrection 'F'	$61,768,190	
2	The Boy and the Beast	$46,400,000	
3	Detective Conan: Sunflowers of Inferno	$43,782,211	
4	Doraemon: Nobita's Space Heroes	$36,019,702	
5	Love Live! The School Idol Movie	$21,700,000	
6	Yo-Kai Watch: Enma Daiō to Itsutsu no Monogatari da Nyan!	$19.4 million	
7	Crayon Shin-Chan: My Moving Story! Cactus Large Attack!	$18,200,000	
8	Boruto: Naruto the Movie	$16,800,000	
9	Pokémon the Movie: Hoopa and the Clash of Ages	$22,000,000	
10	The Anthem of the Heart	$8,505,999	

== Deaths ==
- October 27 - Miyu Matsuki, voice actress

== See also ==
- 2015 in Japanese television
- 2015 in Austria
- 2015 in French television
- 2015 in German television
- 2015 in Greece
- 2015 in Russia
- 2015 in television
- 2015 in animation
- 2015 in manga
