= Radiant season 1 =

Radiant
- Season 1
- No. of episodes: 21

Release
- Original network: NHK Educational TV
- Original release: October 6, 2018 – February 23, 2019

Season chronology
- Next → Season 2

Radiant is an anime series based on the French comic book series of the same name written and illustrated by Tony Valente. The series is directed by Seiji Kishi and Daisei Fukuoka, and written by Makoto Uezu, with animation by studio Lerche. Character designs are produced by Nozomi Kawano, and Masato Koda is composing the series' music. The 21-episode anime series aired on NHK Educational TV from October 6, 2018, to February 23, 2019. It is based on volumes 1 through 4 of the manfra. The series is simulcast by Crunchyroll, with Funimation producing an English dub as it aired.

The series received a French dub which first aired on Game One in France on September 2, 2019.

Funimation's English dub of Radiant began airing on ABC Me in Australia starting on January 2, 2021.

The opening theme is "Utopia" by 04 Limited Sazabys, while the ending theme is "Radiant" by Polkadot Stingray.

== Episode list ==
No.	Title (Note: All English episode titles are taken from Crunchyroll.)	Original release date	English air date
1	"The Young Sorcerer -Seth-"; Transliteration: "Mahōtsukai no shōnen -Seth-" (Japanese: 魔法使いの少年 -Seth-)	October 6, 2018	January 2, 2021
2	"True Courage -Bravery-"; Transliteration: "Hontō no yūki -Bravery-" (Japanese: 本当の勇気 -Bravery-)	October 13, 2018	January 9, 2021
3	"The Day of Departure -Alma-"; Transliteration: "Tabidachinohi -Alma-" (Japanese: 旅立ちの日 -Alma-)	October 20, 2018	January 16, 2021
4	"A Meeting in the Sky -Encounter-"; Transliteration: "Ōzora no deai -Encounter-" (Japanese: 大空の出会い -Encounter-)	October 27, 2018	January 23, 2021
5	"A Paradise of Wisdom and Hope -Artemis-"; Transliteration: "Eichi to kibō no rakuen -Artemis-" (Japanese: 英知と希望の楽園 -Artemis-)	November 3, 2018	January 30, 2021
6	"Drops of Friendship -Melie-"; Transliteration: "Yūjō no shizuku -Melie-" (Japanese: 友情の雫 -Mélie-)	November 10, 2018	February 6, 2021
To be accepted as Yaga's pupil, Seth must prove his strength as a sorcerer. He asks Melie for help, but attack magic is not her strong suit, so she tells him she cannot help... but her worry for Seth causes her personality to take a drastic turn into "Crazy Melie." She teaches Seth the harsh and dangerous lesson that strength cannot be gained unless you're prepared to die for it, but then things go horribly wrong.
7	"The Beast of the Underground Water System -Monster-"; Transliteration: "Chika suidō ni hisomu mono -Monster-" (Japanese: 地下水道に潜む者 -Monster-)	November 17, 2018	February 13, 2021
8	"Proof of Strength -Progress-"; Transliteration: "Tsuyo-sa no shōmei -Progress-" (Japanese: 強さの証明 -Progress-)	November 24, 2018	February 20, 2021
9	"Those Who Hunt Heretics -Inquisition-"; Transliteration: "Itan o karu-mono-tachi -Inquisition-" (Japanese: 異端を狩る者たち -Inquisition-)	December 1, 2018	February 27, 2021
10	"Broom of Memories -Memory-"; Transliteration: "Omoide no hōki -Memory-" (Japanese: 思い出の箒 -Memory-)	December 8, 2018	March 6, 2021
11	"The City That Roars Like Thunder -Rumble Town-"; Transliteration: "Gōon to kensō no machi -Rumble Town-" (Japanese: 轟音と喧騒の街 -Rumble Town-)	December 15, 2018	March 13, 2021
12	"The Shadow Lurking in the City -Darkness-"; Transliteration: "Machi ni sukuu yami -Darkness-" (Japanese: 街に巣食う闇 -Darkness-)	December 22, 2018	March 20, 2021
13	"Overture of Turbulence -Storm-"; Transliteration: "Dōran jokyoku -Storm-" (Japanese: 動乱序曲 -Storm-)	December 29, 2018	March 27, 2021
Captain Konrad of the Inquisition convinces the people of Rumble Town that all the accidents there have been the fault of immigrants and sorcerers. Fueled by anger and fear, the town's residents lead an uprising, demanding the elimination of all infected people... all according to Konrad's plan. When the people begin to riot, they capture Taj and are about to execute him when Seth and Melie sweep in to his rescue. Seth then sets out to stop Konrad, the one inciting all the outrage.
14	"The Bell Tolls the Sound of Destruction -Catastrophe-"; Transliteration: "Hōkai no kanenone -Catastrophe-" (Japanese: 崩壊の鐘の音 -Catastrophe-)	January 5, 2019	April 3, 2021
Seth tries to rescue Doc, who has been taken hostage, and ends up captured himself. Konrad denounces him to the people as a criminal who colluded with the immigrants to do evil, and then kicks off a bombardment of cannon fire on the part of the town where the immigrants had settled. Seth is rescued with Grimm's help, but at the same time, the Nemesis appears and creates further chaos. They learn that the Nemesis is being controlled by a female sorcerer named Hameline, who despises Rumble Town. Just what is Hameline's objective?
15	"With Fists Like Shooting Stars -Burst-"; Transliteration: "Sono kobushi wa ryuusei no you ni -Burst-" (Japanese: その拳は流星のように -Burst-)	January 12, 2019	April 10, 2021
Fifteen years ago, a young Hameline, having been infected, was imprisoned in Rumble Town along with three other infected children. When Major Oxumare of the Inquisition stands up for the children, a young Konrad kills him and frames the children for his mutiny. Frightened, the people had the entire district where the prison was removed from the island to plunge into the abyss. This is the truth of what happened fifteen years ago. The sole survivor of that incident, Hameline, has been awaiting this moment to take revenge.
16	"Fly High and Pierce Through the Storm -Rising-"; Transliteration: "Arashi ugachi maiagare -Rising-" (Japanese: 嵐穿ち舞い上がれ -Rising-)	January 19, 2019	April 17, 2021
Konrad makes a formidable foe with his giant lance. After a grueling fight, Seth finally defeats Konrad, but the collapse of the town has already begun by Hameline's hand. When she attacks Seth, he is sent flying and loses consciousness. He awakes to find himself face-to-face with a man whose face closely resembles his own. The man calls himself Piodon and asks Seth what he is fighting for, what side he is truly on. Seth then rushes back to the battle to stop Hameline.
17	"To Stop the Sound of the Wind -Serenade-"; Transliteration: "Ima kazenone o tomete -Serenade-" (Japanese: いま風の音を止めて -Serenade-)	January 26, 2019	April 24, 2021
18	"The Light That Follows the Darkness -Awakening-"; Transliteration: "Yami no ato no hikari -Awakening-" (Japanese: 闇のあとの光 -Awakening-)	February 2, 2019	May 1, 2021
19	"The World That You Changed -Relief-"; Transliteration: "Kimi ga kaeta sekai -Relief-" (Japanese: 君が変えた世界 -Relief-)	February 9, 2019	May 8, 2021
20	"Omen -Sign-"; Transliteration: "Yochō -Sign-" (Japanese: 予兆 -Sign-)	February 16, 2019	May 15, 2021
21	"In Search of the Future -Utopia-"; Transliteration: "Mirai o motomete -Utopia-" (Japanese: 未来を求めて -Utopia-)	February 23, 2019	May 22, 2021
