= Radiant season 2 =

Radiant
- Season 2
- Visual key
- No. of episodes: 21

Release
- Original network: NHK Educational TV
- Original release: October 2, 2019 – February 26, 2020

Season chronology
- ← Previous; Season 1

The second season of the Radiant anime television series is animated by Lerche. It is based on the manfra series of the same name written and illustrated by Tony Valente. In the season finale, a 21-episode second season was announced. It premiered on October 2, 2019. The opening theme is "Naraku" by Halo at Yojohan, while the ending theme is "Chitto mo Shiranakatta" by Emi Nakamura.

== Episode list ==
No. overall	No. in season	Title (Note: All English episode titles are taken from Crunchyroll.)	Original release date	English air date
22	1	"Toward a New Adventure -Overture-"; Transliteration: "Aratanaru bōken e -Overture-" (Japanese: 新たなる冒険へ -Overture-)	October 2, 2019	May 29, 2021
Seth travels aboard Alma's home-ship to the continent of Cyfandir and the city of Caislean Merlin. On board, he discovers that Don Bossman and Jiji are now serving as Alma's assistants after she saved them. Meanwhile, Captain Dragunov is called to a far-away place by the Inquisition, for what he believes is a punishment, but learns he's going to become a Thaumaturge.
23	2	"An Encounter in the Rain -Mist-"; Transliteration: "Kirisame no Kaikō -Mist-" (Japanese: 霧雨の邂逅(かいこう) -Mist-)	October 9, 2019	June 5, 2021
After he parts ways with Alma, Seth crosses paths with the Baron Merchants on his way to Caislean Merlin. The Merchants, who made a lot of money selling weapons to the Inquisition, had seen their earnings diminish with its fall from grace and are looking for a mysterious new income source. Seth evades being captured by them thanks to a timely rescue by Grimm. Meanwhile, Dragunov, now a Thaumaturge, travels to Caislean Merlin with fellow Thaumaturge Liselotte. On his arrival to the city, Seth discovers Mélie and Doc are also there.
24	3	"The City of Knights -Caislean Merlin-"; Transliteration: "Kishi no To -Caislean Merlin-" (Japanese: 騎士の都 -Caislean Merlin-)	October 16, 2019	June 12, 2021
Mélie is angry at Seth and she and Doc leave without talking to him. Seth tries to gain access to the information about Radiant in Caislean Merlin's library, to no avail. He then meets a mysterious man called Myr, thank to whom he meets a Sorcerer-Knight Apprentice, Ocoho.
25	4	"The Bringer of Calamity -Dullahan-"; Transliteration: "Wazawai wo yobu mono -Dullahan-" (Japanese: 災いをよぶ者 -Dullahan-)	October 23, 2019	June 19, 2021
26	5	"Silent Rain, Distant Hearts -Rain-"; Transliteration: "Amaoto shizukani kokoro wa tōku -Rain-" (Japanese: 雨音静かに心は遠く -Rain-)	October 30, 2019	June 26, 2021
27	6	"His Name Is -Diabal-"; Transliteration: "Ka no Mono no Nawa -Diabal-" (Japanese: 彼(か)の者の名は -Diabal-)	November 6, 2019	July 3, 2021
28	7	"The Spectre Battle -Spectre-"; Transliteration: "Supekutoru kōbō-sen -Spectre-" (Japanese: スペクトル攻防戦 -Spectre-)	November 13, 2019	July 10, 2021
29	8	"Seth in the Forest of Time -Caillte-"; Transliteration: "Toki no Mori no Seto -Caillte-" (Japanese: 時の森のセト -Caillte-)	November 20, 2019	July 17, 2021
30	9	"The Palace of Schemes -Palace-"; Transliteration: "Bōryaku no Ōkyū -Palace-" (Japanese: 謀略の王宮 -Palace-)	November 27, 2019	July 24, 2021
31	10	"The Qualifications of a Knight -Quality-"; Transliteration: "Kishi no Shikaku -Quality-" (Japanese: 騎士の資格 -Quality-)	December 4, 2019	July 31, 2021
32	11	"Now, Feel the World -Resonance-"; Transliteration: "Ima Sekai wo Kanjite -Resonance-" (Japanese: いま世界を感じて -Resonance-)	December 11, 2019	August 7, 2021
33	12	"The Truth Is Like a Curse -Ocoho-"; Transliteration: "Shinjitsu wa Noroi no Yō ni -Ocoho-" (Japanese: 真実は呪いのように -Ocoho-)	December 18, 2019	August 14, 2021
34	13	"Your Decision -Knighthood-"; Transliteration: "Kimi no Ketsui -Knighthood-" (Japanese: 君の決意 -Knighthood-)	December 25, 2019	August 21, 2021
35	14	"The Final Battlefield -Battlefield-"; Transliteration: "Kessen no Daichi -Battlefield-" (Japanese: 決戦の大地 -Battlefield-)	January 8, 2020	August 28, 2021
36	15	"Led to the Abyss by a Melody of Death -Harmonizium-"; Transliteration: "Naraku e Izanau Horobi no Shirabe -Harmonizium-" (Japanese: 奈落へ誘(いざな)う滅びの調べ -Harmonizium-)	January 15, 2020	September 4, 2021
37	16	"The Light of Life is Extinguished -Tragedy-"; Transliteration: "Kie Yuku Inochi no Tomoshibi -Tragedy-" (Japanese: 消えゆく命の灯火(ともしび) -Tragedy-)	January 22, 2020	September 11, 2021
38	17	"The Black Dragon Descends -Pen Draig-"; Transliteration: "Kuroki Ryū wa Maiorita -Pen Draig-" (Japanese: 黒き竜は舞い降りた -Pen Draig-)	January 29, 2020	September 18, 2021
39	18	"The Will of the People Shines Bright -Resistance-"; Transliteration: "Kagayaku wa Hito no Ishi -Resistance-" (Japanese: 輝くは人の意思 -Resistance-)	February 5, 2020	September 25, 2021
40	19	"I Can't Hear Your Voice -Myrddin-"; Transliteration: "Kiminokoe ga Kikoenai -Myrddin-" (Japanese: 君の声が聞こえない -Myrddin-)	February 12, 2020	October 2, 2021
41	20	"A Bouquet of Flowers for This Land -Fantasia-"; Transliteration: "Kono Daichi ni Hanataba o -Fantasia-" (Japanese: この大地に花束を -Fantasia-)	February 19, 2020	October 9, 2021
42	21	"The Future is With You -Eternity-"; Transliteration: "Mirai wa Kimi to Tomoni -Eternity-" (Japanese: 未来は君とともに -Eternity-)	February 26, 2020	October 16, 2021
