= Clock Striker =

American OEL manga series

- Volume 1 cover, featuring Cast and Philomena Clock
- Author: Frederick L. Jones
- Illustrator: Issaka Galadima; REKSE (formerly)
- Publisher: MyFutprint Entertainment; Rockport Publishers
- Demographic: Shōnen
- Magazine: Saturday AM
- Original run: 2015 – present
- Collected volumes: 3 (List of Volumes)

Clock Striker (Note: Japanese: CLOCK STRIKER(クロックストライカー)) is an original English-language manga series created by writer Frederick L. Jones and artist Issaka Galadima. Clock Striker has been serialized in MyFutprint Entertainment's Saturday AM since September 2015, with the chapters collected into volumes. Clock Striker and other Saturday AM titles are also referred to as "diverse manga." The manga is notable for, the company's self-proclamation, featuring shōnen manga's first Black female lead hero.

== Plot ==
The story is about Cast, a 12-year-old girl who dreams of becoming a "Smith", a legendary group of warrior engineers and problem solvers. Traditionally, Smiths have never included women, children, and especially not Black, female children. Cast gets selected as a "Striker," or apprentice, to the enigmatic Philomena Clock, one of the rare female Smiths. Cast is determined to follow her dreams no matter how dangerous their adventures get.

== Media ==
=== Manga ===
Upon its debut, Clock Striker was written by Frederick L. Jones and illustrated by REKSE, beginning serialization in Saturday AM on September 7, 2015. The series had a sneak-peek in Saturday AM Issue #24, dated April 25, 2015, accompanied by an interview with former artist REKSE. The series was supposed to make its debut in Issue #29, but instead debuted with a run from Issues #32 until #34. At the 2020 Free Comic Book Day, MyFutprint announced Nigerien-French artist, Issaka Galadima, as the new illustrator.

Since 2020, MyFutprint Entertainment and Rockport Publishers have been releasing the paper copies of the series in English. In June 2025, Webtoon Entertainment announced a new partnership with Saturday AM. Clock Striker, along with other Saturday AM titles, will be part of a new slate of the publisher's most popular series from BIPOC creators to Webtoon's English-language platform. This is the first wave of series reformatted for Webtoon's vertical scroll and is set to launch in Fall 2025.

==== Volumes ====
No.	Title	Release date	ISBN
1	I'm Gonna Be a SMITH!	February 7, 2023	978-0-76-038157-1
Chapter 1 : "The Dynamic Duo"; Chapter 2 : "Begins"; Chapter 3 : "School Ties"; Chapter 4 : "Family Ties"; Chapter 5 : "Like a Glove"; Chapter 6 : "Employee Review"; Chapter 7 : "Severance"; Chapter 8 : "Busy Bodies"; Chapter 9 : "The Haunting"; Chapter 10 : "Secrets and Lies"; Chapter 11 : "More than It Seems"; Chapter 12 : "Secret Weapon"; Chapter 13 : "Concealed Carry"; Chapter 14 : "Math Problems"
2	The Sharing Society	September 10, 2024	978-0-76-038923-2
Chapter 15 : "Sharing Society - Part 1"; Chapter 16 : "Sharing Society - Part 2"; Chapter 17 : "The Bath, The Beast, and the Balkinaccios"; Chapter 18 : "War Memories"; Chapter 19 : "A Normal City?"; Chapter 20 : "The Sky Striker"; Chapter 21 : "The Innkeeper"; Chapter 22 : "The Crystal Cave"; Chapter 23 : "Cast's Crucible"
3	The Cogs in the Machine	February 17, 2026	978-0-76-038925-6
Chapter 24 : "Rumble in Two"; Chapter 25 : "Crystal Reflections"; Chapter 26 : "It's Beautiful Isn't It?; Chapter 27 : "Loyalties"; Chapter 28 : "The Time is NOW!"; Chapter 29 : "Descent into Danger"; Chapter 30 : "Sacrifices Have to be Made"; Chapter 31 : "In the Nick of Time"; Chapter 32 : "It's Beautiful Isn't It? [Part 2]; Chapter 33 : "The Giant is ME!"

=== Novel ===
On February 3, 2023, Saturday AM announced a new imprint called "WEL/RED" for its light novel licenses. In 2026, Clock Striker will get a prequel light novel under WEL/RED titled Clock Striker Origins: The Rights We Give.

=== Video games ===
Cast and other characters appear in the online/mobile card game Flick Solitaire developed by Flick Games. In 2025, MyFutprint announced that the Saturday AM: Battle Manga two-versus-two tag-team fighting game, produced by Son Studios, was in development. The game will feature characters from Saturday AM manga, including Clock Striker.

== Critical reception ==
In Kirkus Reviews, for Volume 1: "I'm Gonna Be a SMITH!", they described the manga as "a fantastic, refreshing series opener." The story merges a "fun atmosphere with serious topics like discrimination" in a digestible manner for teen readers." Additionally, for Volume 2: "The Sharing Society", they wrote that this volume is "a worthy sequel that will keep readers intrigued and engaged." The second volume of the manga series continues Cast's "Striker" journey as she focuses on trying to save her friend. This volume brings new characters, both enemies and allies, into the mix as Cast and Philomena Clock find themselves caught up in plots that raise the stakes. Samantha King, of ScreenRant, declares that "Clock Striker's first volume is a must read for shonen manga fans."

Eisner award winner, Sanford Greene, says "Saturday AM's Commitment to serving as a gateway for talented black and brown creators in the visual style of manga is inspiring, with artists like WhytManga and JeyOdin and series like Apple Black and Clock Striker, I'm eager to see them embark on this new journey of bringing their vision to graphic novels and to readers around the world." The series, along with the magazine, have gotten honors from peers like French manga artist and creator of the Radiant series, Tony Valente.

Lauren Bullock, a staff writer for Black Nerd Problems, said that she "was floored that Clock Striker didn't yet have a viral fan base like many of the other comics." Most notably, after the series returned from a year-long hiatus, Bullock commented that she admired that Cast "is this unusually perfect blend of attributes that makes her both relatable and compelling. Lots of shonen manga tends to rely on hyperbole and contrast to make their protagonists look good by comparison." As intended by the creator, Bullock found herself relating to Cast because "being a girl, Black, and disabled [we] all have the same unfortunate negative connotations for Cast, but if anything this often gives her the opportunity to take advantage of her opponent's confusion or disregard."

=== Shonen Manga's First Black Female Protagonist ===
MyFutprint founder, Frederick L. Jones, claimed the title of "[Cast is] the first Black female hero in shonen manga." Many article sources have gone on to confirm this as fact: Screen Rant, Black Nerd Problems, Comicbook.com, and Anime News Network.

Although the magazine and publisher have been getting prejudiced comments since origination, Clock Striker went especially viral on Twitter for a 2022 tweet from artist, WhytManga, saying "shonen manga's first Black female protagonist is here…" From this one tweet, came days of a thread and responses. The primary replies were: (1) support and excitement to see a Black female protagonist in shonen, and (2) racism, including tweets like the main character with blonde hair and blue eyes. The company has been met with resistance for defining their series as a "manga." However, one of their titles "Underground" by JR De Bard has been recognized as "manga" by the 18th Annual Japan International Manga Awards in 2025 and was given the Bronze Award. Also, from October 26, 2023, to February 18, 2024, the Clock Striker manga was on display in Kyoto Manga Museum's Comics in Francophone Africa Exhibit. The manga Clock Striker has become one of the most popular non-Japanese manga globally, including Japan.

=== Awards ===
In 2023, Clock Striker won the VLA's Graphic Novel Diversity Award Youth Honor. In 2024, the manga was awarded as one of the Great Graphic Novels for Teens by the YALSA. The year culminated with the manga getting a nomination for the TLA 2024 Mavericks List.

In 2022, the manga was nominated for the Dwayne McDuffie Award for Diversity in Comics.
