= Apple Black =

American OEL manga series

- Volume 1 cover, featuring Sano Bengote Tamashii
- Author: Odunze Oguguo
- Publisher: MyFutprint Entertainment; Rockport Publishers
- Demographic: Shōnen
- Magazine: Saturday AM
- Original run: 2014 – present
- Collected volumes: 5 (List of Volumes)

Apple Black (Note: Japanese: APPLE BLACK(リンゴブラック)) is an American/Nigerian original English-language manga series written by and illustrated by Odunze Oguguo/Whyt Manga. Apple Black has been serialized bi-weekly in MyFutprint Entertainment's Saturday AM since December 2014, with the chapters collected into volumes. Apple Black and other Saturday AM titles are also referred to as Diverse Manga.

== Plot ==
Many years ago, humans acquired “Black” fruits from a tree that descended from the skies, turning humans into sorcerers. Although all of Black is now extinct, humans still have sorcery inherited from their ancestors. Blessed with the Arodihs arm by Merlin, the god of sorcery, Sano is raised and trained in isolation and secrecy to be the world’s savior, known as the Trinity. The savior is the one who dawns the Infinite Night, an eternal night of chaos. With his newfound freedom from isolation, Sano gets a fiery start after being admitted to Black Bottom Island’s guild for young sorcerers. As his fellow gifted allies and sorcerers like Opal Wantmore accompany Sano on his quest, the treachery, betrayal, and evil that have plagued nearly all of Eden again threaten the world. Sano fears his power can either save the world or destroy it. With his visions offering him a darker path, Sano seeks to find those responsible for his loss, and walk away from revenge and toward forgiveness to find closure. Ridding Eden of the Infinite Night will require him to uncover the secrets behind his father’s research on fully rejuvenating the effects of Black in bloodlines with the immense power known as "Apple Black."

== Characters ==
Sano Bengote Tamashii

Sano is raised and trained in isolation and secrecy to be the world’s savior, known as the Trinity. The savior is the one who dawns the Infinite Night, an eternal night of chaos. With his newfound freedom from isolation, Sano gets a fiery start after being admitted to Black Bottom Island’s guild for young sorcerers. As his fellow gifted allies and sorcerers like Opal Wantmore accompany Sano on his quest, the treachery, betrayal, and evil that have plagued nearly all of Eden again threaten the world. Sano fears his power can either save the world or destroy it. With his visions offering him a darker path, Sano seeks to find those responsible for his loss, and walk away from revenge and toward forgiveness to find closure

Opal Wantmore
Ruby "Ryuzaki The Great"
Symon
Obinna D. Emeluwa
Arodihs
Lily Dardanelle
Neona "Neon" Mercury
Osamu Shimojigoku
Mikael Barouge
Madam Naomi Barogue
Angelo Dominik Rimokon
Willow Wantmore
Gideon Banburi
Prince Ceazar Ashokahn
Sir. Jekyl
Miss Kiki Gonzaleth
Sir. Jackoby
Lady Fulanii Haruna
Grudon Fattimunga
Sofia Miri

== Media ==
=== Manga ===
Written by and illustrated by Odunze Oguguo, also known as "Whyt Manga," Apple Black began serialization in Saturday AM's on December 18, 2014. Both MyFutprint Entertainment and Rockport Publishers are releasing the series in English the same day it is published.

==== Volumes ====
No.	Title	Release date	ISBN
1 (Note: Volumes 1 and 2 were originally published independently by MyFutprint Entertainment. In October 2021, Saturday AM began partnering with The Quarto Group's art and design imprint Rockport Publishing.)	Neo Freedom	December 18, 2014; July 12, 2022 (Rockport edition)	978-0-69-235137-6; 978-0-76-037684-3 (Rockport edition)
Chapter 1 : "Freedom Day"; Chapter 2 : "Admission"; Chapter 3 : "Arm of a God"; Chapter 4 : "Harbinger"; Chapter 5 : "A Rush of Blood to the Head"; Chapter 6 : "Nirvana Red"
2	Sunny Eyes	November 15, 2017; November 8, 2022 (Rockport edition)	978-0-76-037691-1; 978-0-99-958140-7 (Rockport edition)
Chapter 7 : "Memento"; Chapter 8 : "Wilt"; Chapter 9 : "Sandman"; Chapter 10 : "The Placebo Effect"; Chapter 11 : "Cordon Genesis"; Chapter 12 : "Descend"; Chapter 13 : "Inner Crusade"; Chapter 14 : "Target Man"; Chapter 15 : "Unsanctioned"
3	Instruments of Vengeance	May 2, 2023	978-0-76-038230-1
Chapter 16 : "The Smoke"; Chapter 17 : "Blueprint"; Chapter 18 : "Daredevil"; Chapter 19 : "Rude Awakening"; Chapter 20 : "Viva La Vida"; Chapter 21 : "Requiem"; Chapter 22 : "Death And All His Friends"; Chapter 23 : "Good News Testament"
4	Holy Spectre	November 21, 2023	978-0-76-038250-9
Chapter 24 : "Cold Windy Beach"; Chapter 25 : "Homecoming"; Chapter 26 : "From The Ashes"; Chapter 27 : "Plug"; Chapter 28 : "Render Unto"; Chapter 29 : "Doomsday Clock"; Chapter 30 : "Deity"; Chapter 31 : "Scorcher"; Chapter 32 : "Ascend"
5	Rumble Trials	November 19, 2024	978-0-76-039034-4
Chapter 33 : "The Usual Suspects"; Chapter 34 : "Sun and Moon"; Chapter 35 : "A Rush of Blood to the Heart"; Chapter 36 : "The Dreamer's Club"; Chapter 37 : "Goof"; Chapter 38 : "Abre Los Ojos"; Chapter 39 : "Nevermind"; Chapter 40 : "Blacklist"; Chapter 41 : "Rumble Trials"; Chapter 42 : "Siren Odyssey"

=== Novel ===
Black-owned manga digital comics magazine Saturday AM announced the release of a collaboration with acclaimed Marvel and DC Comics writer Stephanie Williams on the magazine’s first-ever light novel, Apple Black Origins: The Spectrum and the Spectre, a prequel to the original manga series. Williams is known for her contributions to iconic comic titles such as Wonder Woman, Captain America and Scarlet Witch as well as Milestone Media. The light novel was released on June 25, 2024.

=== Video games ===
Sano Bengote Tamashii and Arodihs appear as characters in the online/mobile card game Flick Solitaire developed by Flick Games. In 2025, MyFutprint announced that the Saturday AM: Battle Manga two-versus-two tag-team fighting game, produced by Son Studios, was in development. The game will feature characters from Saturday AM manga, including Apple Black.

== Reception ==
In Kirkus Reviews, for Volume 1: "Neo Freedom", they wrote that as the first installment, it's "an inventive series opener with promise." In summary, Sano Bengote Tamashii is a young sorcerer who has just started attending a school for sorcerers called Newgarth. He has been isolated for most of his life and has trouble interacting with his classmates. There are rumors that Sano may be the one prophesied to bring salvation to the continent of Eden, which is trapped in a cycle of vengeance as the power of the Black wanes. The story is set in a complex and intricate world with magic and hierarchy and is told through a mix of color and black-and-white illustrations. The main characters are depicted as having light skin, while many of the secondary characters appear to be Black or South Asian. The story combines humor and action. Additionally, for Volume 2: "Sunny Eyes", they wrote that this volume is "a total rush for manga fans seeking something off the beaten path." The second volume of the manga series continues the story of young Sano, who has mysterious powers embodied in his ebony arm known as Arodihs, and the factions that are competing for control of these powers. A new character, Opal Wantmore, arrives on the scene and becomes involved in a rebel faction's plan to take over the young sorcerers' guild and use Sano and Arodihs for their own nefarious purposes. The plot is driven by action and includes many characters, some of whom are introduced abruptly. The illustrations in the book are in black and white and depict characters of various skin tones. A glossary is included to help explain some of the details of Sano's world, but it is hoped that this will be expanded in future volumes. The book is likely to be appealing to fans of manga for its diverse cast of characters and intricate plot.

Eisner award winner Sanford Greene said that Saturday AM's commitment to serving as a gateway for creators in the visual style of manga was inspiring, and that with artists like WhytManga (Odunze Oguguo) and JeyOdin (Jonathan Mullins) and series like Apple Black and Clock Striker, he was "eager to see them embark on this new journey of bringing their vision to graphic novels and to readers around the world." French manga artist and creator of the Radiant series, Tony Valente, said: "Saturday AM Creators are diverse and so are the stories they tell! When you look at titles like Apple Black and Clock Striker - Dayum! They're like comfort food, giving you the shonen-type energy you crave when you're a shonen fan!"

== Awards ==
In 2023, Apple Black was nominated for a Comic Scene 2024 award for Best Manga, against the likes of Dandadan, One Piece, Radiant, Rooster Fighter, Chainsaw Man, and Animal Crossing's New Horizons-Deserted Island Diary manga.

Apple Black Origins: The Spectrum and the Spectre won the Children's Book Council 2025 Favorites Award for Young Adult novels for 9th to 12th grade.
