= Saturday AM (magazine) =

English manga anthology

- Saturday AM Issue #1, cover dated December 2013
- Frequency: Ongoing
- Publisher: MyFutprint Entertainment
- Founder: Frederick L. Jones; Odunze Oguguo; Raymond Brown
- Founded: 2013; 13 years ago
- Country: United States
- Based in: Morrisville, North Carolina
- Website: www.saturday-am.com

Saturday AM is an ongoing English-written international shōnen manga anthology magazine founded in Morrisville, North Carolina, in 2013 by Frederick L. Jones and published by MyFutprint Entertainment. The magazine is presented as "the world's most diverse manga anthology".

== History ==
MyFutprint Entertainment was founded in 2013 by Frederick L. Jones. The North Carolina–based Jones was a lifelong anime fan, moved on from a career as an executive in the video game industry to found MyFutprint Entertainment and the imprint Saturday AM with artists around the world. Jones created this company to assist in developing and marketing new manga concepts for creators from around the world.

One of the first events that Saturday AM had established for aspiring manga artists was an annual event called "Summer of Manga" followed by an NCAA March Madness inspired fanart competition called "March Art Madness".

On November 9, 2020, MyFutprint Entertainment announced that it had partnered up with online light novel publisher Jabberwocky Toys to release their licensed "BlownUps" limited edition figures with licensing for their series Apple Black, Bully Eater, and The Massively Multiplayer World of Ghosts.

On October 13, 2021, The Quarto Group, a global publisher of books and content for adults and children, and Saturday AM announced an ongoing publishing partnership. Print titles will be published by Quarto under its art and design imprint, Rockport Publishers. They published 10 titles in 2022 from 7 different series, and an additional 10 to 12 titles are scheduled in 2023 and 2024. This partnership was to bring MyFutprint Entertainment's manga titles to a wider audience and expand the availability of its manga titles in both print and digital formats.

On June 25, 2025, Saturday AM partnered with Webtoon to have their series available for free in a brand new vertical scroll format made popular in Korea.

=== Summer of Manga ===
The company hosts a "Summer of Manga" as an annual event. The event is open to manga artists from all over the world. Participants are invited to submit original short stories for a chance to be published in the summer issues of Saturday AM magazine. Selected entries are not only published in the magazine, but the best performing artists receive the opportunity to be featured in Saturday AM's annual anthology book and receive a monetary prize. Summer of Manga is a great way for aspiring manga artists to get their work published and gain recognition in the industry. The event has helped to launch careers and help with recruitment, and it is a valuable opportunity for anyone who is serious about pursuing a career in manga.

=== March Art Madness ===
Taking inspiration from the NCAA March Madness Basketball Competition, "March Art Madness" is an online fanart competition where artists compete against each other to draw the most exciting fanart piece. Themes can range from anime, superheroes, classic American cartoons, NCAA mascots, designing solitaire cards, mythological creatures, and more. The Winners of each round will face off against a new artist - until there is one artist remaining. The grand prize winner traditionally receiving a brand-new Apple iPad Pro among other prizes. With runner ups also receiving prizes. According to the Saturday AM staff, March Art Madness is an excellent way to access an artist's skills and their ability to complete an illustration on a tight deadline - something that manga artists from Japan do on a regular basis. Notable performers have a higher chance of getting selected to participate in other events such as "Summer of Manga".

== Publication history ==
MyFutprint published the magazine Saturday AM with series like Apple Black from Nigeria and Clock Striker from the United States, becoming an alternate option to the Jump magazines from Japan.

Eisner Award winner Sanford Greene said that "Saturday AM's Commitment to serving as a gateway for talented black and brown creators in the visual style of manga is inspiring, with artists like WhytManga (Odunze Oguguo) and JeyOdin and series like Apple Black and Clock Striker, I'm eager to see them embark on this new journey of bringing their vision to graphic novels and to readers around the world". French manga artist and creator of the Radiant series, Tony Valente also said that "Saturday AM Creators are diverse, and so are the stories they tell! When you look at titles like Apple Black and Clock Striker--dayum! They're like comfort food, giving you the shonen-type energy you crave when you're a shonen fan!"

Saturday AM collaborated with the US-based subsidiary of one of Japan's largest eBook distribution company's, Media Do Co., Ltd., called Media Do International Inc. This was the first time Media Do introduced Japanese manga to U.S. readers.

=== Imprints ===
On February 3, 2023, Saturday AM announced a new imprint called "Wel/Red" for its light novel licenses, headed by co-founder Odunze Oguguo. On October 9, 2023, the imprint was launched by Oguguo in partnership with graphic novel author Stephanie Williams.

- Apple Black Origins: The Spectrum and the Spectre by Odunze Oguguo & Stephanie Williams (2024)
- Clock Striker Origins: The Rights We Give (2026)
- To Save the World I Became a Supremacist (2026)

== Staff ==
- Frederick L. Jones
- Jey Odin
- Morganne Walker
- Odunze Oguguo / Whyt Manga
- Oscar Fong
- Rashad Millhouse
- Raymond Brown
- Austin Harvey-Younis
- Fred Tornager
- Alexis Stokes
- Jackie Rinde
- Demetrene Billups
- Joshua Thomas

== List of titles ==
=== Saturday AM (main line) ===
- Apple Black
- Atlas Article
- Bully Eater
- Clock Striker
- Comet Man
- Crunch Time
- Hammer
- The Massively Multiplayer World of Ghosts
- Orisha
- Paradise Down
- Soul Beat
- Spoon
- Titan King

=== Saturday Afternoon ===
- Benedict Nick the Phenomenal Brick
- Boneyard
- Dream State
- Happily Ever After
- Reaper, Inc.

=== Saturday Brunch ===
- Gunhild
- Grimmheim
- Henshin
- Otherworldly Travel Agency
- Protect, Marry, Kill
- Zephyr

=== Saturday PM ===
- 4Strikes
- Bacassi
- Deaddie Du Dead
- Code Name: Villain
- Oblivion Rouge
- Outland
- Revolver Kiss
- Underground
- Yellow Stringer

== Other magazines ==
- Fan Art Friday
- Saturday Plus
- Saturday Retro
- Super Saturday
- Saturday Annual

=== Super Saturday ===
- Saturday Wars

== Other media ==
=== Podcast ===
- Saturday Daily
- Saturday FM

=== Video games ===
- Flick Solitaire (by Flick Games)
- Saturday AM: Webcomic Rumble (by Marmot Media)
- Saturday AM: Battle Manga (by Son Studios)

== Reception ==
Many of the Saturday AM titles have received positive feedback and been honored with numerous rewards. Underground creator John-Raymond De Bard, a.k.a. JR De Bard, received the Bronze Award at the 18th Annual Japan International Manga Awards.
