= Global manga (disambiguation) =

Global manga is sequential art in the manga tradition that is produced outside Japan without Japanese involvement.

Global manga may more specifically refer to:

- Manfra
- Original English-language manga
