= Dreamland (manfra) =

French comic book series

- Cover art of the first volume published by Pika Édition
- Genre: Adventure, fantasy
- Author: Reno Lemaire
- Publisher: Pika Édition
- Country of origin: France
- Original run: January 25, 2006 – present
- Volumes: 24

Dreamland
- Based on: Dreamland by Reno Lemaire
- Written by: Jean-Luc Cano; Antoine Maurel
- Directed by: Juan Pablo Machado; Joe Celse
- Music by: Fabien Nataf
- Opening theme: movin'on by Faulieu.
- Ending theme: dream catcher by Ai Tomioka
- Country of origin: France
- Original language: French
- No. of episodes: 10

Production
- Running time: 23 minutes
- Production companies: Ellipse Animation (Note: Credited as Dupuis Audiovisuel); La Chouette Compagnie

Original release
- Network: Animation Digital Network (France); ANN (ABC TV, TV Asahi) (Japan); Crunchyroll (streaming)
- Release: October 18, 2026 – present

Dreamland is a French comic book (manfra) series written and illustrated by Reno Lemaire. The series has been published by Pika Édition since January 2006 and has 24 volumes released in French as of July 2026. It was later published by the Japanese publisher Euromanga and Asukashinsha in October 2024. An animated television series adaptation produced by Ellipse Animation via Dupuis Audiovisuel and La Chouette Compagnie premiered in France and Japan in October 2026, with Animation Digital Network and Crunchyroll streaming the series.

== Plot ==
High school student Terrence Meyer has been afraid of fire ever since the death of his mother. During a dream, he confronts his fear and becomes a traveler. He gains the ability to travel to "Dreamland". In Dreamland, he has the ability to control fire. He decides to use his power to protect people's dreams from nightmares and other travelers.

== Characters ==
Terrence Meyer
Voiced by: Luca Garzo (French), Kakeru Hatano (Japanese)

Terrence is a well-meaning, kind, but somewhat naive teenager. As a child, he witnessed his mother burning to death in a fire, causing him to develop pyrophobia. However, after conquering his fears in a dream, he became a traveler and gained pyrokinetic abilities. He decides to search for Edenia, a place said to be an entrance to the afterlife, in order to see his mother again.

Eve Bright
Voiced by: Valérie Bescht (French), Asami Tano (Japanese)
Lydia Neri
Voiced by: Émilie Marié (French), Kaede Hondo (Japanese)
Savane Donelli
Voiced by: Adrien Larmande (French), Takuya Eguchi (Japanese)
Sabba Malouki
Voiced by: Grégory Laisné (French), Hiroyuki Yoshino (Japanese)
Ben Meyer
Voiced by: Bruno Meyere (French), Takuya Matsumoto (Japanese)
Nyti
Voiced by: Jeanne Chartier (French), Serika Hiromatsu (Japanese)
Neil
Voiced by: Charles Mendiant (French), Daisuke Namikawa (Japanese)
Sealvia
Voiced by: Bruno Meyere (French), Makoto Furukawa (Japanese)
Carl Gustav Jung
Voiced by: Martial Le Minoux (French), Masahiko Tanaka (Japanese)
Asmodehus
Voiced by: ? (French), Junichi Suwabe (Japanese)
Shun
Voiced by: ? (French), Miyu Irino (Japanese)

== Media ==
=== Animated series ===
An animated television series adaptation was announced during summer 2022. It will be produced by Ellipse Animation and La Chouette Compagnie and directed by Juan Pablo Machado, with Jean-Luc Cano and Antoine Maurel as the head writers, Bénédicte Ciaravino serving as character designer, and Fabien Nataf composing the music. Mediatoon Distribution handles all global sales for the series. The series premiered on Animation Digital Network in France, as well as its Japanese dub on October 18, 2026, on the Animazing!!! programming block on all ANN affiliates, including ABC TV and TV Asahi, while Animation Digital Network and Crunchyroll are both streaming the series with France Télévisions onboard as an additional commissioner for the series. The opening theme song is "movin'on", performed by Faulieu., and the ending theme song is "dream catcher", performed by Ai Tomioka.
