= List of Radiant volumes =

French comic series in manga style

Radiant is a French comic series in manga style (manfra), written and illustrated by Tony Valente. It has been published by Ankama since 2013 and currently has 20 volumes released in French. The series has been published in English by Viz Media since 2018 and currently has 19 volumes released. It has also been published in Japanese by Asukashinsha under the Euromanga Collection imprint since 2015, making it the first manfra to become published in Japan. Additional languages it has been published are German by Pyramond since 2016, Italian Mangasenpai since 2017, Spanish LetraBlanka since 2016, and Catalan by Editorial Base since 2024. The manfra was adapted into a Japanese anime series that premiered in 2018.

== Volume list ==
No.	Original release date	Original ISBN	English release date	English ISBN
1	4 July 2013	978-2-35910-391-5	11 September 2018	978-1-9747-0381-4
Chapter 1: "Nemeses" (French: Némésis); Chapter 2: "Awakening" (French: Éveil); Chapter 3: "Someone Hairy, Someone Horny" (French: La Chevelue et le Cornu); Chapter 4: "MLM Show" (French: M.L.M Show)
2	7 March 2014	978-2-35910-486-8	13 November 2018	978-1-9747-0382-1
Chapter 5: "Fantasia" (French: Fantasia); Chapter 6: "Jean Pedrovitch of Noche Salomon Grispépin Wondersmith" (French: Jean Pedrovitch De La Noche Salomon Grispépin Wondersmith); Chapter 7: "Welcome to Rumble Town" (French: Bienvenue à Rumble Town); Chapter 8: "Northern Suburb" (French: Faubourg Nord); Chapter 9: "A Theater Piece" (French: Coup de Théâtre); Chapter 10: "Domitor" (French: Domitor); Chapter 11: "Two Loogies and some Pee" (French: Deux Mollard et du pipi); Chapter 12: "Here Comes a New Challenger!" (French: Here comes a new challenger)
3	27 February 2015	978-2-35910-505-6	8 January 2019	978-1-9747-0384-5
Chapter 13: "After Rumble Town Crumbles" (French: Quand Rumble Town seffondrera); Chapter 14: "Execution" (French: Exécution); Chapter 15: "Renaissance" (French: Renaissance); Chapter 16: "North-East Jail" (French: North East Jail); Chapter 17: "The Fall" (French: La chute); Chapter 18: "Thaumaturges" (French: Thaumaturges); Chapter 19: "The Rampart" (French: Le rempart); Chapter 20: "A Coffin for Doc" (French: Un cercueil pour le doc)
4	20 November 2015	978-2-35910-862-0	12 March 2019	978-1-9747-0385-2
Chapter 21: "Piodon" (French: Piodon); Chapter 22: "Kannibal" (French: Kannibal); Chapter 23: "Which Side?: Part 1" (French: Quel camp ? (1)); Chapter 24: "Which Side?: Part 2" (French: Quel camp ? (2)); Chapter 25: "The Monster They Thought They Saw" (French: Le monstre qu'ils ont cru voir); Chapter 26: "The Miracle" (French: Le "Miracle"); Chapter 27: "Post Tenebras Lux" (French: Post tenebras lux); Chapter 28: "M.L.M. Show 2nd Edition" (French: M.L.M Show vol.2)
5	8 July 2016	978-2-35910-966-5	14 May 2019	978-1-9747-0386-9
Chapter 29: "The Thaumaturge Captain" (French: Le capitaine Thaumaturge); Chapter 30: "The Bravery Duet" (French: The Bravery Duet); Chapter 31: "Merchant-Barons" (French: Les Barons-Marchands); Chapter 32: "Caislean Merlin" (French: Caislean Merlin); Chapter 33: "The Statue Imp" (French: Le Lutin de la Statue); Chapter 34: "Spectrum Nemesis" (French: Némésis Spectrum); Chapter 35: "The Wizard Queen" (French: La Reine Sorcière); Chapter 36: "Dreams" (French: Songes)
6	2 December 2016	979-10-3350-096-4	9 July 2019	978-1-9747-0387-6
Chapter 37: "The Spectrum Falls" (French: La chute du Spectrum); Chapter 38: "Last Breath" (French: Dernier Souffle); Chapter 39: "Blood" (French: Sang); Chapter 40: "Trapper" (French: Trappeuse); Chapter 41: "The Imp of the Forest" (French: Le Lutin de la Forêt); Chapter 42: "Wilted" (French: Fané); Chapter 43: "The Rebel" (French: L'Insoumise); Chapter 44: "A Wizard's Senses" (French: Les Sens du Sorcier)
7	3 July 2017	979-10-3350-450-4	10 September 2019	978-1-9747-0388-3
Chapter 45: "Hostile" (French: Hostile); Chapter 46: "Improvise!" (French: Improvise !); Chapter 47: "Gysoni" (French: Gysoni); Chapter 48: "Little People" (French: Petit Peuple); Chapter 49: "Heirs" (French: Héritiers); Chapter 50: "The Tail" (French: Filature); Chapter 51: "The Dullahan" (French: La Dullahan); Chapter 52: "The Strength of Rocks" (French: La Force des cailloux)
8	1 December 2017	979-10-3350-487-0	12 November 2019	978-1-9747-0389-0
Chapter 53: "Untamable Heir" (French: L'héritière indomptable); Chapter 54: "B.O.T." (French: B.O.T.); Chapter 55: "Illusion" (French: Illusion); Chapter 56: "Message of Peace" (French: Message de paix); Chapter 57: "The Wizard-Kings" (French: Les Rois-sorciers); Chapter 58: "Memories" (French: Souvenirs); Chapter 59: "My Son" (French: Mon Fils); Chapter 60: "Stone Guardians" (French: Gardiens de pierre)
9	25 May 2018	979-10-3350-545-7	14 January 2020	978-1-9747-0885-7
Chapter 61: "Mordred" (French: Mordred); Chapter 62: "The Captured Queen" (French: La reine captive); Chapter 63: "Those Calling the Shots" (French: Donneurs d'ordres); Chapter 64: "The Queen's Head" (French: La tête de la reine); Chapter 65: "Memory Stones" (French: Pierres de mémoires); Chapter 66: "The Armor of Penn Draig" (French: L'armure de Pen Draig); Chapter 67: "Subhumans" (French: Des sous-hommes); Chapter 68: "Commander Ullmina" (French: Commandante Ullmina)
10	21 September 2018	979-10-3350-555-6	10 March 2020	978-1-9747-0886-4
Chapter 69: "Myrrdin" (French: Myrddin); Chapter 70: "Tin Toy" (French: Jouet de ferraille); Chapter 71: "A Soul Black to the Core" (French: Une âme si noire); Chapter 72: "All Must Die" (French: Tous mourir); Chapter 73: "Sacrificed" (French: Sacrifiée); Chapter 74: "Take Off Your Masks" (French: Tomber les masques); Chapter 75: "At Least a Thousand Times" (French: Au moins mille fois); Chapter 76: "Broom Broom Cup Survival" (French: Broom Broom Cup Survival)
11	22 February 2019	979-10-3350-929-5	12 May 2020	978-1-9747-1263-2
Chapter 77: "Boom Boom Cup Survival #2" (French: Broom Broom Cup Survival #2); Chapter 78: "Finish Line" (French: Finish Line); Chapter 79: "Marry Me Baby" (French: Marry me baby); Chapter 80: "Disillusion" (French: Désillusion); Chapter 81: "The Mesnie" (French: La Mesnie); Chapter 82: "Inquisitor" General (French: Général Inquisiteur); Chapter 83: "Side Effects" (French: Effets secondaires); Chapter 84: "Corrosive" (French: Corrosif)
12	30 August 2019	979-10-3350-964-6	14 July 2020	978-1-9747-1264-9
Chapter 85: "Dragonfly" (French: Dragonfly); Chapter 86: "Devour Him" (French: Le Dévorer); Chapter 87: "Soup" (French: Soupe); Chapter 88: "Yaga's Cauldron" (French: Le Chaudron de Yaga); Chapter 89: "Confined" (French: Claustrés); Chapter 90: "Silver Filings" (French: Limaille D'argent); Chapter 91: "Kill Everyone" (French: Tuer tout le monde); Chapter 92: "The Canopy" (French: La Canopée)
13	31 January 2020	979-10-3350-976-9	13 October 2020	978-1-9747-1744-6
Chapter 93: "Adriel" (French: Adriel); Chapter 94: "Helping Hand" (French: Coup de Main); Chapter 95: "The Hills of Bome" (French: Les Buttes de Bôme); Chapter 96: "I will not let you go" (French: Je ne te lâcherai pas); Chapter 97: "Instantaneous" (French: Instantané); Chapter 98: "So Happy" (French: Si contentes); Chapter 99: "Venelope's Eyes" (French: Le Regard de Vénélope); Chapter 100: "The Conversos" (French: Les Conversos)
14	28 August 2020	979-10-3350-983-7	10 August 2021	978-1-9747-2118-4
Chapter 101: "The Below" (French: L'en deçà); Chapter 102: "Sacrificed" (French: Sacrifée); Chapter 103: "Disarmed" (French: Désarmés); Chapter 104: "Suffer in their Stead" (French: Souffrir à leur Place); Chapter 105: "Emeth" (French: Emeth); Chapter 106: "Just Scared" (French: Juste Effrayés); Chapter 107: "Help Me" (French: Aide-moi); Chapter 108: "An Island of Your Own" (French: Un îlot à toi)
15	1 October 2021	979-10-3351-248-6	9 August 2022	978-1-9747-2457-4
Chapter 109: "Adhes" (French: Adhès); Chapter 110: "With My Best Regards" (French: Avec Reconnaissance et Respect); Chapter 111: "I Won't Abandon You" (French: Je ne t'ai pas Lâché); Chapter 112: "The Fantasia That Shapes Us" (French: Le Fantasia qui nous Façonne); Chapter 113: "Monsters In The Fog" (French: Des Monstres dans le Brouillard); Chapter 114: "Learn To Respect Yourself" (French: Apprendre à te respecter); Chapter 115: "We Are Useless" (French: On ne Sert à Rien); Chapter 116: "Our Uniform" (French: Notre Uniforme)
16	1 April 2022	979-10-3351-187-8	14 February 2023	978-1-9747-3675-1
Chapter 117: "The Glebe" (French: La Glèbe); Chapter 118: "Dead or Alive" (French: Mort ou Vif); Chapter 119: "Instruments of Destruction" (French: Outils de destruction); Chapter 120: "An Unconditional Liberty" (French: Une Liberté Inconditionnelle); Chapter 121: "Appearances" (French: Apparences); Chapter 122: "Don't be Afraid of Me" (French: N'aie pas peur de moi); Chapter 123: "The Phantom Squadron" (French: L'Escadron Fantôme); Chapter 124: "Grimm's Soldier" (French: Soldat de Grimm)
17	2 December 2022	979-10-3351-408-4	21 November 2023	978-1-9747-4130-4
Chapter 125: "Alone With The Domitors" (French: Seul chez les Domitors); Chapter 126: "The Swarm" (French: L'Essaim); Chapter 127: "Why So Much Restraint?" (French: Pourquoi tant de retenue?); Chapter 128: "Mama" (French: Maman); Chapter 129: "Give Me Your Trust" (French: M'accorder ta confiance); Chapter 130: "Perjury" (French: Parjure); Chapter 131: "At the Edge of My Conscience" (French: Aux Frontières de ma Conscience); Chapter 132: "Your Decisions" (French: Tes Décisions)
18	8 December 2023	979-10-3351-406-0	12 November 2024	978-1-9747-4934-8
Chapter 133: "Wisps" (French: Follets); Chapter 134: "Inquisitors on the Loose" (French: La Balade des Inquisiteurs); Chapter 135: "The Squadron of Clouds" (French: L'Escadron des Nuages); Chapter 136: "See Again" (French: Voir Encore); Chapter 137: "This is War" (French: Nous Sommes en Guerre); Chapter 138: "Being Afraid" (French: Avoir Peur); Chapter 139: "Sleepy Doc" (French: Dodo Doc); Chapter 140: "From Whose Eyes?" (French: Aux Yeux De Qui?)
19	22 November 2024	979-10-3351-720-7	11 November 2025	978-1-9747-5898-2
Chapter 141: "Annihilation" (French: Annihilation); Chapter 142: "Stalactites of Rare Beauty" (French: Des Stalactites d'une Rare Beauté); Chapter 143: "Your Mission as a Drop" (French: Ta Mission en tant que Goutte); Chapter 144: "Dominium" (French: Dominium); Chapter 145: "My Reality" (French: Ma Réalité); Chapter 146: "In the Shadows of these Nasty Plants" (French: À l'ombre de ces Vilaines Plantes); Chapter 147: "No Good Reason" (French: Aucune Bonne Raison); Chapter 148: "De-Escalation" (French: Désescalade)
20	October 30, 2026	979-10-3357-010-3	—	—
