= Dupuis Edition & Audiovisuel =

Belgian/French animation production subsidiary of Ellipse Animation

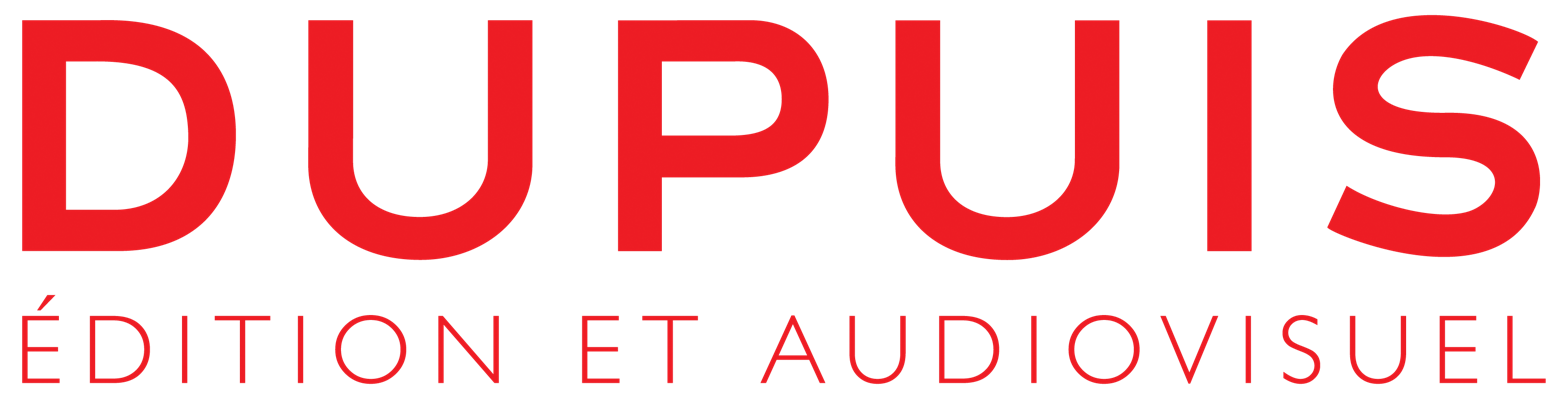
- Type: Subsidiary
- Industry: Animation
- Founded: 1965; 61 years ago
- Headquarters: 57, rue Gaston Tessier, Paris, France
- Products: Television series Feature films
- Parent: Dupuis (1965–2022); Ellipse Animation (2022–present)

Dupuis Edition & Audiovisuel (also known as Dupuis Audiovisuel) is the audiovisual production company and production label of Paris-based animation entertainment group Ellipse Animation, which is owned by French media conglomerate and publishing company Média-Participations. It was originally the audiovisual division of the comic book publisher Dupuis until 2022, when it was transferred to Ellipse Animation, based in Marcinelle, Belgium. It focuses on adapting popular comic book properties into animated series and feature films, including Dupuis properties such as The Smurfs and Living with Dad.

== History ==
In September 2002, Dupuis Audiovisuel, via its distribution division Dupuis Audiovisuel International, had appointed sales management Christophe Vervaeke to handle Dupuis Audiovisuel's licensing rights for Dutch-speaking countries.

In June 2004, Média-Participations, who owns French animation production studios Dargaud Marina and its subsidiary Ellipsanime, had brought out Belgian/French audiovisual production company Dupuis Audiovisuel alongside its parent publishing house Dupuis and its animation studio Belvision for €300 million to increase its audiovisual production activities. The acquisition of Dupuis Audiovisual and its parent Dupuis gave Média-Participations two new animation production companies, as Dupuis Audiovisuel became part of the group's expanded animation business, with Dupuis Audiovisuel's distribution business division Dupuis Distribution being folded into Dargaud Marina's own distribution arm, Dargaud Distribution, with them assuming Dupuis Audiovisuel's production library, and would distribute the latter's future television series.

In September 2017, Dupuis Audiovisuel partnered with Smurfs owner and global licensor IMPS (now Peyo Company) under Peyo Productions to produce a television reboot of the global comic franchise The Smurfs.

In June 2020, Dupuis Edition & Audiovisuel announced an adaptation of the comic book series Dad for French broadcaster M6 entitled Living with Dad with Caroline Duvochel, CEO of both the former and fellow Média-Participations' animatiom department studios, serving as executive producer, while Dupuis Edition & Audivisuel'a fellow Belgian animation studio DreamWall, Angoulême-based animation studio Ellipse Studio Angoulême and Madlab Animations (a joint venture between Dupuis Edition & Audiovisuel's fellow animation subsidiary Ellipsanime Productions and Ankama Animations) handled animation services for the series.

In June 2022, during the Annecy International Animation Film Festival, Dupuis Edition & Audiovisuel, alongside their parent company Dupuis and its owner Media Participations, brought all of their French animation production labels (which were Dupuis Edition & Audiovisuel, Dargaud Media and Ellipsanime Productions alongside their in-house Paris and Angoulême-based animation production studio division Ellipse Studio) under one umbrella group named Ellipse Animation, with Dupuis Edition & Audiovisuel being transitioned from its former publishing parent Dupuis to the new animation production group while it continued producing series as a label within the group.

== Filmography ==
=== Television ===
| Title | Years | Network | Notes |
|---|---|---|---|
| Billy the Cat | 1996–2001 | France 3 S4C (Wales); ZDF (Germany) | co-production with EVA Entertainment, Les Films du Triangle, La Fabrique, Network of Animation, Sofidoc, Cologne Cartoon and WIC Entertainment |
| Flash Gordon | 1996–1997 | Canal+ France 3 Syndication (United States); Channel 4 (United Kingdom); YTV (Canada) | co-production with Lacewood Productions, Carrere Television, Mediatoon and Hearst Entertainment; Based on the comic strip of the same name by Alex Raymond |
| Vor-Tech: Undercover Conversion Squad | 1996 | Syndication | co-production with Universal Cartoon Studios, Mediatoon and Lacewood Productions |
| Papyrus | 1998–2000 | La Deux; TF1 (France); YTV (Canada) | co-production with Medever |
| Largo Winch | 2001–2002 | RTL-TVI; M6 (France); ProSieben (Germany); Global Television Network (Canada) | co-production with Paramount International Television, Tandem Communications, TVA International and Betafilm |
| Cédric | 2002–2007 | France 3 Canal J (seasons 1–2); RTBF | co-production with Neptuno Films (season 1) and Araneo (season 2) |
| Kid Paddle | 2003–2006 | M6 & Canal J Teletoon (Canada); RTBF | co-production with Spectra Animation |
| Spirou & Fantasio | 2006–2009 | M6; RTBF (Belgium) | co-production with Araneo and Fantasia Animation |
| Little Spirou | 2012–2015 | La Trois; M6 & Teletoon+ (France) | co-production with LuxAnimation and Araneo |
| Little Furry | 2017–2021 | La Trois & Ketnet; Piwi+ (France) | co-production with Dargaud Media and Belvision |
| Roger & His Humans | 2020–present | YouTube/Animation Digital Network | |
| The Smurfs | 2021–present | La Trois & Ketnet; TF1 (France); Kika (Germany); Nickelodeon (International) | co-production with Dargaud Media (season 1), Les Cartooneurs Associés (season 2), Ellipsanime Productions (season 3–) and Peyo Productions |
| Living with Dad | 2022–present | La Trois; M6, Canal J & Gulli (France) | co-production with Ellipsanime Productions and Belvision; Based on the comic book series Dad by Nob |
| The Marsupilamis | 2025–present | La Trois & Ketnet; Gulli (France); Nickelodeon (International); Radio-Canada (Canada) | co-production with Dargaud Media and Belvision |
| Trotro and Zaza | 2025–present | France 5; Rai Yoyo (Italy) | co-production with Ellipsanime Productions, Studio Campedelli, Mediatoon Distribution and Rai Kids |
| Dreamland | 2026 | Animation Digital Network | co-production with La Chouette Compangie |

=== Feature films ===
| Title | Release date | Distributor | Notes |
|---|---|---|---|
| The Smurfs and the Magic Flute | December 24, 1975 | Mercury Films | co-production with Belvision, Lafig S.A and IMPS |
| Zombillenium | October 18, 2017 | Gebaka Films | co-production with Belvision, Maybe Movies and 2 Minutes |
| Yakari, A Spectacular Journey | August 12, 2020 | BAC Films (France); Leonine Distribution (Germany) | co-production with Dargaud Media, Belvision, Le Lombard, BAC Films Production, Leonine Production, WunderWerk, Gao Shang Pictures, WDR and France 3 Cinema |
