= With a Dog AND a Cat, Every Day is Fun =

Japanese manga series

- Cover of With a Dog AND a Cat, Every Day is Fun volume 1 by Kodansha

犬と猫どっちも飼ってると毎日たのしい (Inu to Neko Dotchi mo Katteru to Mainichi Tanoshii)
- Manga
- Written by: Hidekichi Matsumoto
- Published by: Kodansha
- English publisher: NA: Vertical
- Magazine: pixiv Comic
- Original run: 2017 – present
- Volumes: 6
- Anime television series
- Directed by: Seiji Kishi
- Written by: Seiji Kishi
- Music by: TAKAROT
- Studio: Team Till Dawn
- Original network: MBS, TBS, BS-TBS
- Original run: October 2, 2020 – March 27, 2021
- Episodes: 24

With a Dog AND a Cat, Every Day is Fun (犬と猫どっちも飼ってると毎日たのしい, Inu to Neko Dotchi mo Katteru to Mainichi Tanoshii) is a Japanese manga series by Hidekichi Matsumoto. It has been serialized online via Matsumoto's Twitter account, as well as pixiv Comic website, since 2017 and has been collected in six tankōbon volumes by Kodansha. The manga is licensed in North America by Vertical. An anime television series adaptation by Team Till Dawn aired from October 2, 2020, to March 27, 2021, on the Super Animeism block.

== Characters ==
Inu-kun (犬くん, lit. "Mr. Dog")
Voiced by: Kana Hanazawa
Neko-sama (猫さま, lit. 'Lord Cat')
Voiced by: Tomokazu Sugita
Hidekichi Matsumoto (松本ひで吉, Matsumoto Hidekichi)
Voiced by: Mai Kanazawa

== Media ==
=== Anime ===
An anime adaptation was announced via Twitter on December 8, 2019. The television series is animated by Team Till Dawn, with Seiji Kishi directing and writing the series, Kazuaki Morita designing the characters, and TAKAROT composing the series' music. It aired from October 2, 2020, to March 27, 2021, on the Super Animeism block on MBS, TBS, BS-TBS, and other channels. Ayaka Ōhashi will perform the series' theme song "Nyan Daa Wan Daa Days", as well as the series' second theme song "Lovely Days". The series ran for 24 episodes. Each episode is approximately 2 minutes in length.
