= Zombillenium =

2017 film

- Film poster
- Directed by: Arthur de Pins; Alexis Ducord
- Written by: Arthur de Pins; Alexis Ducord
- Produced by: Henri Magalon; Léon Perahia
- Starring: Emmanuel Curtil; Alain Choquet; Kelly Marot
- Edited by: Benjamin Massoubre
- Music by: Éric Neveux; Mat Bastard
- Production companies: Maybe Movies; Belvision; Dupuis Edition & Audiovisuel; Universal Pictures International France; Gebaka Films; Pipangaï; 2 Minutes; France 3 Cinema
- Distributed by: Gebeka Films; Universal Pictures (France); Le Parc Distribution (Belgium)
- Release date: 24 May 2017 (Cannes)
- Running time: 78 minutes
- Countries: France; Belgium
- Language: French
- Budget: $15.6 million
- Box office: $1.6 million

Zombillenium (French: Zombillénium) is a 2017 French-Belgian animated film directed by Arthur de Pins and Alexis Ducord, based on the comic series of the same name. It was shown in the Special Screening section at the 2017 Cannes Film Festival.

== Plot ==
Hector Saxe, a Quality control inspector, is a widowed father struggling to give his daughter Lucie the attention she needs. He decides to inspect the Zombillénium amusement park, which features horrific scenes with Zombies, Vampires and Werewolves. During his visit, Hector slips away from Francis, the park's director, and discovers the unthinkable truth: the park's staff are actually made up of supernatural creatures, Francis having suggested to the devil, Behemoth, that he create this amusement park to financially exploit humanity's interest in the fantastic.

After discovering the park's secret, Hector is forbidden from returning to the human world: Francis, a vampire, bites him, leading to his death, much to Lucie's grief. Apparently transformed into a zombie after being bitten by both Francis and Blaise, the werewolf in charge of human resources, Hector has no choice but to remain at the park where he is now employed. He briefly attempts to escape and return to the humans, but is stopped by Gretchen, a witch interning at Zombillénium, who saves him from a human who was trying to kill Hector (having seen him in his new form and believing Hector to be dead and buried).

Hector resigns himself to working at Zombillénium after unintentionally frightening his daughter. He helps the zombie-run ghost train regain its popularity, earning him the friendship of Sirius, the employees' union representative. However, the zombies' success isn't to everyone's liking: it comes at the expense of the vampires' appeal, led by young Steven, who performs on the Ferris wheel. Steven resents Hector's presence, which leads him to continue belittling the zombies, especially since his attraction is losing visitors to the ghost train. Francis must then try to ease the rivalries, particularly as the park, facing financial difficulties, is due to receive an upcoming visit from investors to prevent its closure and the employees' impending doom.

However, this turn of events turns into a fiasco for Francis and the zombies. Steven sabotages the attractions they manage and prevents Hector from appearing in order to promote the vampires, and makes a deal with Behemoth to replace Francis as head of the park. This infuriates Gretchen, who had previously harbored feelings for Steven, but she loses her witch powers after trying to oppose Behemoth, her father. The park, now renamed Vampirama, features only vampires, while the zombies, along with Francis, are relegated to the underworld (the park's deepest subterranean level where the banished employees power the attractions by pushing a giant wheel guarded by a Cerberus ).

However the situation turned upside down by Lucie's arrival. Believing she recognizes her father in old Zombillénium advertisements, she finally manages to slip away from her teacher and go to the park. There she meets Gretchen who, upon learning that she is Hector's daughter, advises Lucie to make a public announcement in the park. Hector hears the message, as does Steven, who grabs Lucie and kidnaps her. Enraged, Hector's powers are amplified tenfold, and he manages to escape from Hell. Encountering Gretchen, he thanks her for taking care of Lucie: by touching Gretchen, he unwittingly restores her powers, revealing that Hector is not a zombie, but a demon.

As the zombies revolt against the vampires, Hector chased after Steven, catching up with him at the roller coaster. Taking advantage of Lucy's escape in one of the cars, Steven eludes Hector and sabotages the tracks, sending Lucy plummeting to her death. Gretchen, having fought the vampires by creating openings in the overcast sky to let in the sun and force them to flee, tries desperately to help Hector and Lucy. Unfortunately the cars eventually crashed, but Lucy managed to survives: Hector has acquired demonic wings that allowed him to escape the disaster after reaching Lucy.

The park then reverts to its original name and puts zombies back in the spotlight (Steven, meanwhile, has had to flee, pursued by the advances of Lucie's former teacher who has fallen for him). Francis becomes director of Zombillénium again, with Hector now the star attraction; while Hector and Gretchen move towards a more romantic relationship while also taking care of Lucie.

== Cast ==
- Emmanuel Curtil as Hector
- Alain Choquet as Francis
- Kelly Marot as Gretchen
- Alexis Tomassian as Steven

== Development ==
The film was announced in January 2016, when Dupuis's film & television arm Dupuis Audiovisuel and illustrator Arthur de Pins announced an adaptation of his comic book series entitled Zombillenium with him serving as director for the upcoming film with Dupuis Audiovisuel producing alongside French animation studio 2 Minutes, Universal Pictures International France, and Henri Magalon’s Maybe Movies with him serving as producer, while French distributor Gebeka Films would distribute the film in France as Urban Distribution International had brought worldwide sales rights to the film.

=== Animation ===
Animation services provided for the film was provided by Dupuis Edition & Audiovisuel's in-house Charleroi-based Belgian animation studio DreamWall with French animation company & co-producer 2 Minutes handling development and animation production via its studios in Paris and Angoulême while Réunion-based animation studios Pipangaï and Gao Shan Pictures handled the majority of the animation.

== Reception ==
Common Sense Media rated the film 2 out of 5 stars.

== See also ==
- Geraldine (2000 film), an animated short film by Arthur de Pins
