= Ai Tomioka =

Japanese singer-songwriter (born 2002)

- Born: 6 October 2002 (age 23); Tokyo, Japan
- Occupation: Singer-songwriter
- Years active: 2021–present
- Musical career
- Origin: Tokyo, Japan
- Genres: J-pop
- Instrument: Vocals
- Label: Victor
- Website: tomiokaai.net

Ai Tomioka (冨岡 愛, Tomioka Ai; born 6 October 2002) is a Japanese singer-songwriter. Debuting in 2022 with the single "Anata wa Natsumelo", Tomioka experienced commercial success with her 2023 single "Good Bye-bye" and her 2024 single "Koi Suru Wakusei 'Anata' ", which served as a commercial tie-in for the Netflix series Chastity High.

== Life and career ==
=== 2002–2021: Early life and education ===
Ai Tomioka was born in Tokyo, Japan on 6 October 2002. Shortly after turning four years old, her family moved to Gold Coast, Queensland, Australia. Tomioka was motivated to learn guitar during her early childhood after watching a performance video of American singer-songwriter Taylor Swift. During her adolescence, Tomioka and her family moved to Osaka, where Tomioka attended high school. After graduating high school, Tomioka moved to Tokyo.

=== 2021–present: Career beginnings, Ai'scream ===
In the summer of 2021, Tomioka began posting videos on TikTok consisting of original and cover songs. Her cover recordings spanned from popular Japanese artists such as Spitz and Kazuyoshi Saito to overseas artists the Beatles and the Carpenters. In the same year, she won the "Next Break Singer Discovery Audition" award. Following this, Tomioka signed a record deal with Victor Entertainment sublabel Victor. On 23 February 2022, Tomioka released her debut single "Anata wa Natsumelo".

In 2023, Tomioka released the single "Good Bye-bye". The song quickly garnered attention in Asia, reaching the top ten on Spotify for six different countries. In April 2024, she held a street performance in South Korea, attracting over 800 attendees. She later announced her first official live performance in South Korea, Blue Spot, which sold out within 10 minutes of tickets going on sale. Additional live shows were later held in Tokyo.

On September 22, 2025, Tomioka announced her debut studio album, Ai'scream. In support of the album, she announced the Ai'scream Asia Tour. The album was later released on 12 November 2025, to generally positive reviews. On 25 February 2026, she released Ai ga Tokenai Uchi ni, a deluxe edition release of Ai'scream.

== Discography ==
=== Albums ===
==== Studio albums ====
List of studio albums
Title	Album details
Ai'scream	Released: November 12, 2025; Label: Victor; Format: CD, LP, digital download, streaming

==== Reissues ====
List of reissues
Title	Album details
Ai ga Tokenai Uchi ni (愛が溶けないうちに)	Released: February 25, 2026; Label: Victor; Format: Digital download, streaming

=== Singles ===
List of singles, showing year released, selected chart positions, and album name
Title	Year	Peaks	Album
Title	Year	JPN Heat.	Album
"Anata wa Natsumelo" (あなたは懐メロ)	2022	—	Ai'scream
"Rapunzel" (ラプンツェル)	2022	—	Non-album singles
"Rashikunai Yone" (らしくないよね。)	2022	—	Non-album singles
"Present" (ぷれぜんと。)	2022	—	Non-album singles
"Good Bye-bye" (グッバイバイ)	2023	4	Ai'scream
"Ai Need Your Love" (愛 need your love)	2023	—	Ai'scream
"Koi Suru Wakusei 'Anata' " (恋する惑星「アナタ」)	2024	2	Ai'scream
"I Wanna" (アイワナ)	2024	—	Ai'scream
"Jealousy" (ジェラシー)	2024	—	Non-album singles
"Missing You"	2024	—	Non-album singles
"Maybe"	2024	—	Ai'scream
"Otori" (劣り)	2025	—	Non-album singles
"Karoya Kani" (かろやかに)	2025	—	Non-album singles
"Tsuyokau Hakanai Mono Tachi" (強く儚い者たち)	2025	—	Non-album singles
"New Style"	2025	—	Non-album singles
"Heart Beat"	2025	—	Non-album singles
"Delulu"	2025	—	Ai'scream
"Beat Up"	2025	—	Ai'scream
"Soulmate"	2026	—	Non-album singles
"Dilemma" (ジレンマ)	2026	—	Non-album singles
"—" denotes items that did not chart.

==== Promotional singles ====
List of promotional singles, showing year released and album name
Title	Year	Album
"831"	2025	Ai'scream
"Step by Step"	2025	Non-album singles
"We Wish You a Merry Christmas"	2025	Non-album singles

== Music videos ==
List of music videos, showing year released and director
Title	Year	Director
"Rapunzel"	2022	Motoki Munaka
"Rashikunai Yone"	2022	Makino Tsubasa
"Good Bye-bye"	2023	Unknown
"Ai Need Your Love"	2024	Unknown
"Koi Suru Wakusei 'Anata' "	2024	Unknown
"I Wanna"	2024	Unknown
"Jealousy"	2024	Unknown
"Missing You"	2024	Unknown
"Maybe"	2024	Unknown
"Otori"	2025	Unknown
"Karoya Kani"	2025	Unknown
"Tsuyokau Hakanai Mono Tachi"	2025	Unknown
"Step by Step"	2025	Unknown
"Heart Beat"	2025	Unknown
"Delulu"	2025	Unknown
"Beat Up"	2025	Motherfucko
"831"	2025	Shun Murakami

== Tours ==
Concert tours

- Lets Meet on the Dance Floor Tour (2025)
- Ai'scream Asia Tour (2025)
- Before Love Melts Away Tour (2026)

One-off performances

- Blue Spot (September 21–22, 2024)
- Blue Spot: Japan (November 23, 2024)
