= Otakon Vegas =

Anime convention in Las Vegas, Nevada

Coordinates: 36°06′36″N 115°10′15.45″W

- Official Otakon Vegas Logo.
- Status: Inactive
- Genre: Anime, East Asian popular culture
- Venue: Planet Hollywood Resort and Casino
- Location: Las Vegas, Nevada
- Country: United States
- Inaugurated: 2014
- Attendance: 2,243
- Organizer: Otakorp, Inc.
- Filing status: 501(c)(3)
- Website: Otakon Vegas

Otakon Vegas (/ˈoʊtəkɒn/ OH-tə-kon) was a three-day anime convention held during January at the Planet Hollywood Resort and Casino in Las Vegas, Nevada. The convention was organized by Otakorp, the group behind Otakon.

== Programming ==
The convention typically offered an artist alley, concerts, dealer's room, masquerade, and panels. One of the new programming experiments at Otakon Vegas demonstrated Sumo wrestling.

== History ==
Otakorp announced in early 2013 a new convention would be held at the Planet Hollywood Resort and Casino in Las Vegas, Nevada, where they hope to create a smaller convention and test new ideas. Otakon has had issues where new test content has been too successful such as the 2012 Maid Cafe. Representatives from Las Vegas first approached Otakorp about moving Otakon from Baltimore to Las Vegas. Expansion to Vegas was also chosen due to Otakon reaching capacity in Baltimore, along with Vegas being accessible with affordable transportation and several hotel/food options. January dates were chosen for the reason attendees should be less busy. Concerns were raised about the location due to the existence of two conventions in the Las Vegas area.

The convention's first year in 2014 featured more than 70 hours of programming. JAM Project appeared at 2015's opening ceremony while on the ANISONG World Tour Lantis Festival in Las Vegas. Otakon Vegas went on hiatus after 2018's event.

=== Event history ===
| Dates | Location | Atten. | Guests |
|---|---|---|---|
| January 3–5, 2014 | Planet Hollywood Resort and Casino; Las Vegas, Nevada | 2,006 (unique) | Masahiro Ando, Zach Bolton, Richard Epcar, Kelly Gneiting, Riichiro Inagaki, Kaoru Kurosaki, Jamie Marchi, Mary Elizabeth McGlynn, Sayaka Sasaki, Frederik L. Schodt, Ian Sinclair, Ellyn Stern, and Byambajav Ulambayar. |
| January 16–18, 2015 | Planet Hollywood Resort and Casino; Las Vegas, Nevada | 2,100 (est) | Steve Blum, Toshio Furukawa, JAM Project, Shino Kakinuma, Wendee Lee, Mary Elizabeth McGlynn, Lisa Ortiz, and Sushio. |
| January 15–17, 2016 | Planet Hollywood Resort and Casino; Las Vegas, Nevada | 2,243 | Sandy Fox, Todd Haberkorn, Lex Lang, Erica Mendez, Vic Mignogna, and Jason Charles Miller. |
| January 13–15, 2017 | Planet Hollywood Resort and Casino; Las Vegas, Nevada | | Colleen Clinkenbeard, Yasuhiro Imagawa, Hiroshi Kitadani, Lauren Landa, Erica Mendez, Byambajav Ulambayar, and Ryuichi Yamamoto. |
| January 19-21, 2018 | Planet Hollywood Resort and Casino; Las Vegas, Nevada | | SungWon Cho, Erica Lindbeck, Keith Silverstein, and Kiyotaka Waki. |

== See also ==
- Otakon
