= Lerche =

Lerche is surname of:

- Jacob Lerche Johansen (1818–1900), Norwegian naval officer and politician
- Julius Lerche (1836-1914), German politician
- Peter Lerche (1928-2016), German jurist
- Sondre Lerche (born 1982), Norwegian singer, songwriter and guitarist

It may also refer to:

- Lerche (studio), a Japanese animation studio

== See also ==
- Heinkel Lerche
- Lerche–Newberger sum rule
