= Seiji Kishi =

Japanese director of anime

- 岸 誠二
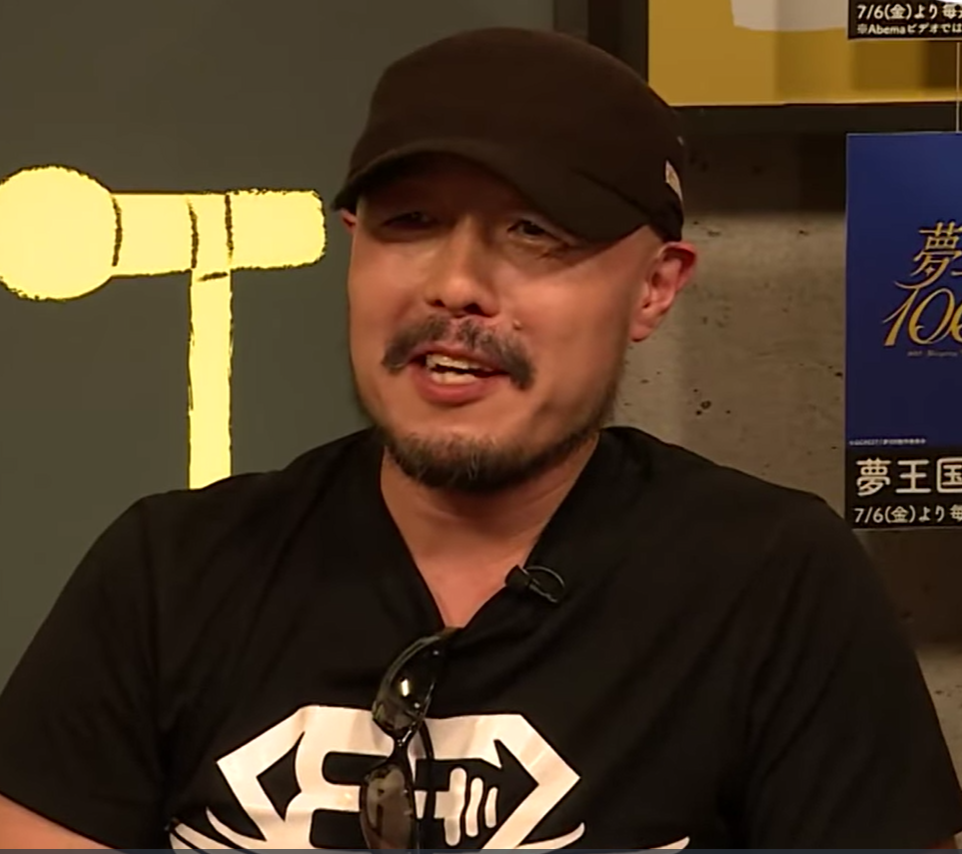
- Kishi in 2018
- Born: Shiga Prefecture, Japan
- Occupations: Animation director; storyboard artist
- Years active: 1993–present
- Organization: Lerche

Seiji Kishi (岸 誠二, Kishi Seiji) is a Japanese animation director.

== Career ==
Kishi was born and raised in Takashima City, Shiga Prefecture. From early childhood, he had a particular interest in movies, manga, anime, and video games. In second grade during elementary school, drawings he created won numerous awards, seeing he had a knack for it, it prompted and inspired him to aim to become an animation director (in his own words, "the beginning of a misunderstanding"). During his student years, he frequently practiced painting and even drew manga himself.

Believing that formal training was necessary to work in animation, he enrolled in the Animation Department of Yoyogi Animation Academy. Initially when starting his career, he aspired to become a director capable of drawing like Hayao Miyazaki. However, after realising the exceptionally high technical standards of the industry, he shifted his focus to directing and storyboarding instead. He subsequently joined Ajiado briefly as an animator. After a period of freelance work, he entered Studio Hibari (also known as Lerche), where, within the software development division, he was involved in developing animation production tools and creating animation for games.

Normally, becoming a director requires prior experience in other positions, such as production management and a established name in the industry. However, Kishi did not want to work the traditional path, and instead actively sought directing opportunities himself. At the time, the anime industry still allowed for considerable flexibility and experimentation on the business side, even though client companies were increasingly deciding in advance which directors they would work with. As a result of these circumstances, Kishi was able to establish himself as a director. He later participated in the founding of the company's animation division, "Team TillDawn," and began working in earnest as an animation director.

Currently, while serving as the representative of Team TillDawn and handling directing and supervisory work, he also serves as a board director of Lerche.

In October 2014, he received an Individual Award at the 19th Animation Kobe Awards..

== Works ==
=== Anime series ===
- Yugo the Negotiator: Pakistan Chapter (2004) – Director
- Ragnarok the Animation (2004) – Director, Storyboard
- Magikano (2006) – Director, Storyboard
- Galaxy Angel II (2006) – Director
- My Bride Is a Mermaid (2007) – Director
- Astro Fighter Sunred (2008–09) – Director
- Astro Fighter Sunred 2 (2009–10) – Chief Director, Storyboard
- Angel Beats! (2010) – Director, Storyboard
- Kamisama Dolls (2011) – Director
- Persona 4: The Animation (2011) – Director
- Humanity Has Declined (2012) – Director
- Devil Survivor 2: The Animation (2013) – Director
- Danganronpa: The Animation (2013) – Director
- Arpeggio of Blue Steel (2013) – Director
- Hamatora: The Animation (2014) – Chief Director
- Re:_Hamatora (2014) – Director
- Persona 4: The Golden Animation (2014) – Chief Director
- Yuki Yuna Is a Hero (2014) – Director
- Assassination Classroom (2015) – Director
- Rampo Kitan: Game of Laplace (2015) – Director
- Assassination Classroom: Second Season (2016) – Director
- Danganronpa 3: The End of Hope's Peak High School (2016) – Chief Director
- Tsuki ga Kirei (2017) – Director
- Classroom of the Elite (2017) – Director
- Yuki Yuna Is a Hero: Washio Sumi Chapter (2017) – Chief Director
- Yuki Yuna Is a Hero: Hero Chapter (2017) – Chief Director
- Asobi Asobase (2018) – Director
- Radiant (2018–20) – Director
- Kengan Ashura (2019) – Director
- With a Dog AND a Cat, Every Day is Fun (2020) – Director, Series Composition
- Yuki Yuna Is a Hero: The Great Mankai Chapter (2021) – Director
- Classroom of the Elite 2nd Season (2022) – Chief Director
- Ao no Orchestra (2023) – Director
- Kengan Ashura 2nd Season (2023) – Director
- Classroom of the Elite 3rd Season (2024) – Chief Director
- Maiden Blood (2027) – Director
- Junket Bank (TBA) – Director
- Promise Me the Spotlight (TBA) - Director

=== Original video animation ===
- My Bride Is a Mermaid OVA (2008–09) – Director
- Carnival Phantasm (2011) – Director
- Fate/Grand Carnival (2021) – Director

=== Anime films ===
- Aura: Koga Maryuin's Last War (2013) – Director
- Persona 3 The Movie: No. 1, Spring of Birth (2013) – Supervisor
- Persona 3 The Movie: No. 2, Midsummer Knight's Dream (2014) – Supervisor
- Persona 3 The Movie: No. 3, Falling Down (2015) – Supervisor
- Persona 3 The Movie: No. 4, Winter of Rebirth (2016) – Supervisor

=== Video games ===
- Danganronpa Another Episode: Ultra Despair Girls (2014) – Director (animated cutscenes)

== Awards ==
In 2014, The 19th Animation Kobe committee chose him to receive their Individual Award for the stretch of his career including Danganronpa: The Animation, Arpeggio of Blue Steel, and Hamatora. In his writeup explaining the committee's choice, Toshiya Matsushita of Animage cited his impressive annual volume of work and his work on Arpeggio of Blue Steel, a fully 3DCG anime, in particular.
