= Manfra =

French comics that draw inspiration from Japanese manga

Manfra are French bandes dessinées that draw inspiration from Japanese manga.

== Nomenclature ==
They are also known as franga, manga français and global manga (the latter a more general term that includes other Western manga-inspired comics).

== Characteristics ==
Most manfra, such as Radiant, Dreamland, Dofus, Debaser, etc. have a format similar to that of manga, but can be read left-to-right, such as with Wakfu, or right-to-left, such as with Radiant. Most if not all of the works that are generally designated as manfra have an art style inspired by manga. Some manfra, such as La Rose Ecarlate, have an art style inspired from manga while still being read left-to-right and having a hardcover bande dessinee format. Their stories sometimes reference those of manga as well.

== Publishers ==
- Ankama Éditions
- Dargaud
- Delcourt
- Glénat
- Les Humanoïdes Associés
- Kami
- Ki-oon
- Pika Édition
- Taifu Comics

== Works ==
- Actor's Studio (fr)
- Amilova (fr)
- Amour Sucré
- Appartement 44
- BB Project (fr)
- La Belle et la Bête (Delcourt) by Patrick Sobral
- Bubble Gôm Gôm (Oktoprod editions) by Cyb
- Burning Tattoo by Emmanuel Nhieu (Ankama Éditions)
- Cassius (Kami) by Saïd Sassine
- Catacombes (fr)
- Celle que... (fr)
- City Hall (fr)
- Debaser (fr)
- Dofus, Dofus Arena and Dofus Monster (fr)
- Dreamland (fr)
- Dys (fr)
- ElementR
- L'Équipe Z (Kotoji Éditions) by Ed Tourriol, Dan Fernandes and Albert Carreres
- L'Escouade des ombres (fr)
- Golem (Olydri Éditions) de Alexis Talone
- Goultard Bazar (fr)
- Green Mechanic (Ki-oon)
- Head-Trick (fr)
- Horion
- Kuma Kuma
- Lanfeust Quest
- Lastman
- Les Iles du vent by Elodie Koeger and Hector Poullet
- Lost Soul
- Love I.N.C. (fr)
- Magical JanKen Pon (fr)
- Necromancer
- Omega Complex
- Outlaw Players
- Pen Dragon (fr)
- Pepper&Carrot
- Pink Diary (fr)
- Radiant
- La Rose écarlate (fr)
- Save me Pythie (fr)
- Sentaï School (fr)
- Tengu-Dō (fr)
- Les Torches d'Arkylon (fr)
- Vis-à-Vis
- Le Visiteur du futur: La Brigade temporelle (Ankama Éditions) by François Descraques, Guillaume Lapeyre and Alexandre Desmassias
- Vivant Human Specimen (fr)
- Wakfu (Ankama Éditions)

== See also ==
- Anime-influenced animation
- Bandes dessinées
- Manga outside Japan
- La nouvelle manga
- Original English-language manga, the English-language equivalent
