= Tony Valente =

French comic artist

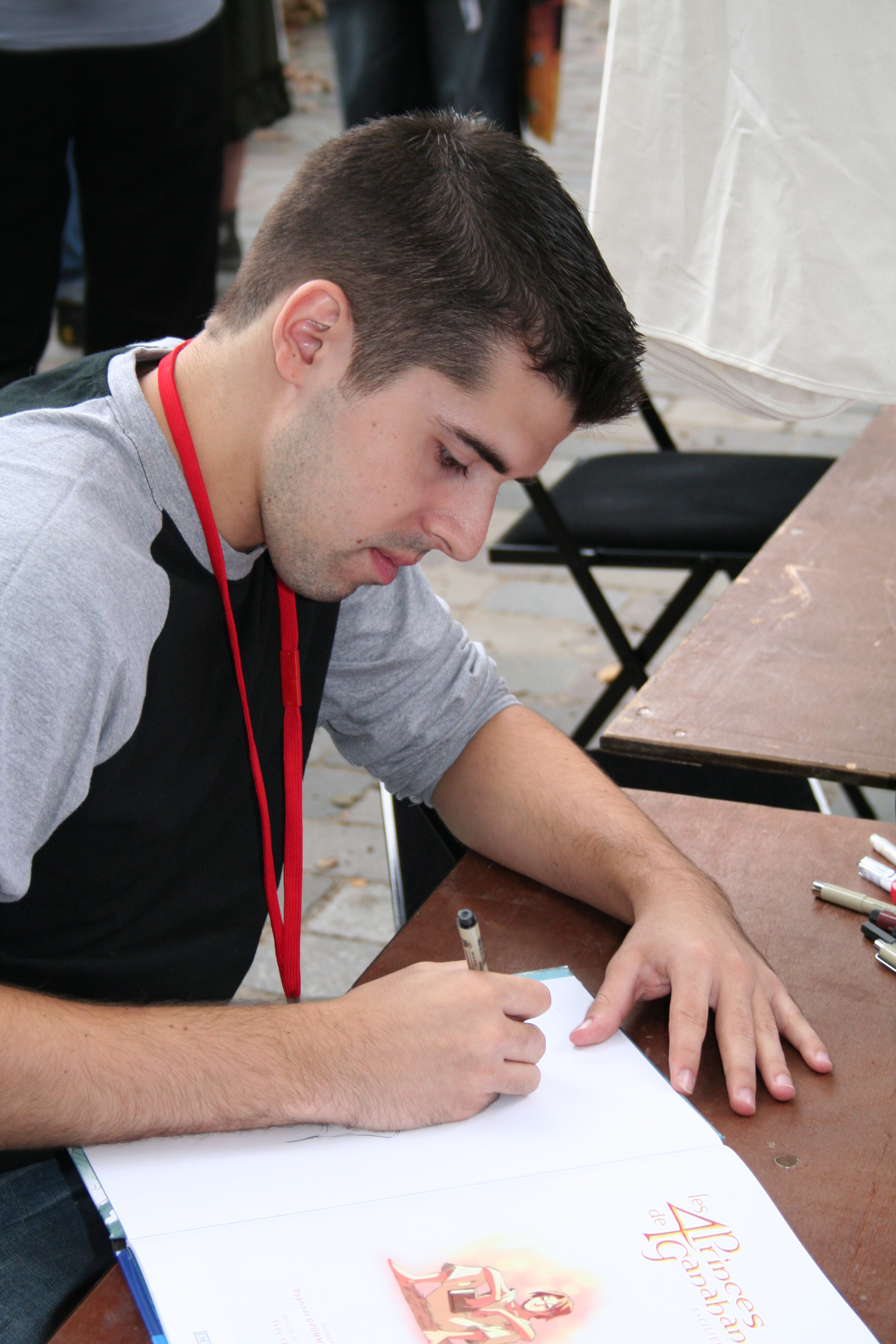
- Valente in 2006
- Born: Tony Valente Pereira; October 11, 1984 (age 42) Toulouse, France
- Area: Cartoonist
- Notable works: Radiant
- Collaborators: Didier Tarquin (2012–2013)
- Awards: Daruma for best international manga at Japan Expo 2016

Tony Valente Pereira (born October 11, 1984) is a French comic artist. After being inspired by works of various other comic artists, Valente began illustrating The Four Princes of Ganahan in 2004. Following its completion, he worked with Didier Tarquin on S.P.E.E.D. Angels. After it ended in 2013, Valente began working on Radiant, which has received critical acclaim and an anime adaptation in 2018.

== Biography ==
Tony Valente was born in Toulouse on October 11, 1984. Valente's family and friends were immigrants; he was the child of Portuguese immigrants, as Portugal was under dictatorship at the time his grandfather came to France. As of 2023, Valente has resided in Montreal since 2010.

As a teenager, Valente was a fan of Akira Toriyama's Dragon Ball, as well as various works by Didier Tarquin. This inspired him to pursue a career in comic creation, which he began in 2004 with illustrations for The Four Princes of Ganahan. One year after its completion, Valente launched his first solo project, Hana Attori. After its completion, he did illustrations for Didier Tarquin's S.P.E.E.D. Angels.

Following its completion, Valente began working on Radiant and eventually released its first volume in 2013. It performed very well commercially, especially in Japan. In 2015, thanks to help from manga artists Yusuke Murata and Hiro Mashima, Radiant became the first manfra to be published in the country. In October 2018, the series received an anime adaptation produced by Lerche. The series has also been acclaimed by critics, and received the Canal BD/J'aime lire comic award in 2015. It also received the Daruma for Best international manga at Japan Expo 2016.

== Works ==
- The Four Princes of Ganahan (2004–2007, story by Raphaël Drommelschlager)
- Hana Attori (2008–2010)
- S.P.E.E.D. Angels (2012–2013, story by Didier Tarquin)
- Radiant (2013–present)
