= Radiant (manfra) =

French comic book series

- Cover art of the first English volume published by Viz Media.
- Genre: Adventure, fantasy
- Author: Tony Valente
- Publisher: Ankama
- English publisher: NA: Viz Media
- Country of origin: France
- Original run: July 4, 2013 – present
- Volumes: 20
- Anime television series
- Directed by: Daiki Fukuoka; Seiji Kishi
- Produced by: Yūsuke Fujita
- Written by: Makoto Uezu
- Music by: Masato Kōda
- Studio: Lerche
- Licensed by: Crunchyroll
- Original network: NHK Educational TV
- English network: AU: ABC Me; US: Crunchyroll Channel
- Country of origin: Japan
- Original run: October 6, 2018 – February 26, 2020
- Episodes: 42

Radiant is a French comic book series written and illustrated by Tony Valente. It has been published by Ankama since 2013 and has 20 volumes released in French as of October 2026. It was later published by the Japanese publisher Euromanga and Asukashinsha in 2015, making it the first manfra to be published in Japan. The series has been licensed by Viz Media in English since 2018 and has 18 volumes released. The series received an anime television series adaptation by Lerche that aired on NHK Educational TV from October 2018 to February 2019, followed by a second season that aired from October 2019 to February 2020.

== Plot ==
In the world of "El Pharenos", a race of powerful monsters called Nemeses fall from the sky. This race infects every living thing they touch. Any humans who survive their contact become cursed, but also gain the ability to wield the magic power known as "Fantasia", thus becoming Sorcerers. Some Sorcerers use their powers for their own gain while others choose to become heroes and protect normal humans from the Nemeses. But whether good or evil, all Sorcerers are mostly treated with fear and contempt by the common folk. There is also an organization known as the Inquisition, which is dedicated to the eradication of Sorcerers.

The series follows Seth, a seventeen-year-old boy who has survived a Nemesis attack. He dreams of defeating all of the Nemeses and bringing peace between Sorcerers and the rest of humanity. To do so, he has to find the place where the Nemeses come from, the legendary Radiant, and destroy it. He and other sorcerers travel the region in search of Radiant whilst avoiding the Inquisition.

== Characters ==
=== Main characters ===
Seth (セト, Seto)
Voiced by: Yumiri Hanamori (Japanese); Christopher Llewyn Ramirez (English)
A seventeen-year-old boy that wants to become a powerful sorcerer. He aspires to end the Nemesis threat and bring peace to the Sorcerers and humans.
Mélie (メリ, Meri)
Voiced by: Aoi Yūki (Japanese); Caitlin Glass (English)
A girl with a curse that causes her sweet personality to invert into a violent one, cool broomstick and an important friend to Seth.
Doc (ドク, Doku)
Voiced by: Shintarou Oohata (Japanese); Shawn Gann (English)
A cowardly researcher that Mélie works for and becomes great friends with Seth.
Mister Bobley (ミスター・ボブリー, Misutā Boburī)
Voiced by: Makoto Koichi (Japanese); Derick Snow (English)
A small dragon and Mélie's closest companion.
Ocoho (オコホ, Okoho)
Voiced by: Mai Fuchigami (Japanese); Alle Mims (English)
An apprentice of the Order of the Knight-Sorcerers of Cyfandir, Ocoho becomes a princess upon becoming Queen Boudica's heir, and starts traveling with Seth in search of the Radiant. Ocoho's curse is a mark just below the ear, when touched she obeys the commands of the person touching it, and does not have memories of what she did. She rides a racoon/dragon named Draccoon.

=== Allies ===
Alma (アルマ, Aruma)
Voiced by: Romi Park (Japanese); Monica Rial (English)
A woman who is an experienced Sorcerer and Nemesis Hunter. She survived the same Nemesis attack Seth survived from ten years ago, losing her right arm. She since raised Seth and teaches him on controlling his Sorcerer powers. Although she acts somewhat hostile towards him, she is shown to be very caring and greatly knows how to use kindness to people.
Boss (ボス, Bosu)
Voiced by: Tetsu Inada (Japanese); Marcus Stimac (English)
The tailed leader of the Bravery Quartet.
Grimm (グリム, Gurimu)
Voiced by: Takehito Koyasu (Japanese); Eric Vale (English)
A mysterious and powerful Sorcerer covered in bandages head to toe and speaks in the third-person.
Master Lord Majesty (マスター・ロード・マジェスティ, Masutā Rōdo Majesuti)
Voiced by: Kappei Yamaguchi (Japanese); SungWon Cho (English)
A talking cat-like being that is the leader of the Artemis Institute.
Yaga (ヤガ, Yaga)
Voiced by: Hiroyuki Yoshino (Japanese); Doug Jackson (English)
A wise, elderly sorcerer who was Alma's mentor. He becomes Seth's mentor as well.
Miss Melba (ミス・メルバ, Misu Meruba)
Voiced by: Nao Tōyama (Japanese); Sakyiwaa Baah (English)
A woman whose father is a puppet on her right hand. Doc has a crush on her, but her father is too controlling.
Hameline
Voiced by: Yumi Uchiyama (Japanese); Trina Nishimura (English)
A Domitor Sorceress who can control a horde of Nemesis with her magic.
Queen Boudica (クイーン・ブーディカ, Kuīn Būdika)
Voiced by: Yukana (Japanese); Kenneisha Thompson (English)
Ruler of Caislean Merlin on the continent of Cyfandir, Queen Boudica has an infection that caused her to grow into a giantess. She becomes the surrogate mother of Myr and Yggdrajill's children, and names Ocoho as her heir.
Lord Brangoire (ブランゴワール, Burangowāru)
Voiced by: Hiroshi Shirokuma (Japanese); Jamal Sterling (English)
Lord de Gulis (ギュリス卿, Gyurisu Kyō)
Voiced by: Yutaka Aoyama (Japanese); J. Michael Tatum (English)
A member of the Knight-sorcerers who tries to flirt with Mélie, tricked into working for the baron-merchants. Following the battle with the Inquisition, de Gulis is jailed for suspicion of conspiracy.
Sagramore (サグラモール, Saguramōru)
Voiced by: Kentarō Kumagai (Japanese); Clifford Chapin (English)
An old classmate of Ocoho's, tricked into working for the baron-merchants. Murdered by Mordred following the former's betrayal.
Myrddin / Myr (ミル, Myr)
Voiced by: Bin Shimada (Japanese); Ben Phillips (English)
A pixie/human hybrid who lives at Caislean Merlin. He has the ability to see and control the flow of Fantasia around. He is married to Jill.
Yggdrajill / Jill (ジル, Jiru)
Voiced by: Kikuko Inoue (Japanese); Luci Christian (English)
Wife of Myr and daughter of Yggdrasil, Yggdrajill, or Jill for short, is a giant dryad who helps teach Seth how to control his inner darkness. Together with Myr, she had children due to be born. Following her death though, Queen Boudica volunteered to carry Myr and Jill's children, becoming their surrogate mother.
Diabal
Voiced by: Kensho Ono (Japanese); Johnny Yong Bosch (English)
A boy with two horns like Seth.
Triton
A man who like Seth and Diabal, has two horns.
Narrator
Voiced by: Show Hayami (Japanese); Barry Yandell (English)

=== Inquisition ===
The Inquisition is based in Bome, the capital of the Estrie Kingdoms, which includes Convictis. Their flagship is the Battle Airship Uranos.

Dart Dragunov (ドラグノフ, Doragunofu)
Voiced by: Kōji Yusa (Japanese); Ivan Jasso (English)
A captain of the Inquisition tasked with bringing in Seth alive. Questions the Inquisitions mission.
Torque (トルク, Toruku)
Voiced by: Kenta Miyake (Japanese); Ray Chase (English)
The main antagonist of the series, he is the general of the Inquisition. Also known as "The Beast".
Von Tepes (フォン・ツェペシュ, Fon Tsuepeshu)
Voiced by: Takuma Terashima (Japanese); Ian Sinclair (English)
Ulmina Bagliore (ウルミナ・バグリオーレ, Urumina Baguriōre)
Voiced by: Saori Hayami (Japanese); Bryn Apprill (English)
Lieselotte (リゼロッテ, Rizerotte)
Voiced by: Ayane Sakura (Japanese); Jamie Marchi (English)
Santori (サントーリ, Santōri)
Voiced by: Kenichi Ogata (Japanese); Kent Williams (English)
Piodan (ピオドン, Piodon)
Voiced by: Ryōhei Kimura (Japanese); Ricco Fajardo (English)
A mysterious young man that appears to be Seth's older brother.
Vérone
Voiced by: Tomoyo Kurosawa (Japanese); Erica Mendez (English)
Prince of the Convictis.
Konrad de Marbourg (コンラッド・ド・マルブール, Konraddo do marubūru)
Voiced by: Katsuki Murase (Japanese); Patrick Seitz (English)
The corrupt prime official for the islet of Rumble Town.

=== Baron Merchants ===
The Baron Merchants are natives of the Pontanian States, known to be business savvy and are technological innovators. They planned to enslave the infected people of Cyfandir.

Baron Doussant (ドゥーサン男爵, Doussant-danshaku)
Voiced by: Kinoshita Hiroyuki
Mordred's father.
Baron Pazz (パズ男爵, Pazu-danshaku)
Voiced by: Yamazaki Takumi
A chubby member of the Baron Merchants.
Baroness Alkon (アルコン女男爵, Alkon Onna Danshaku)
Voiced by: Neya Michiko
Baron Cristolom (クリストロム男爵, Cristolom-danshaku)
Voiced by: Chiba Shigeru
A swordsman who fights with Lord de Gulis.
Baron Furgonde (フュルゴンド男爵, Furgonde-danshaku)
Voiced by: Tone Kentarou
Baroness Furgonde (フュルゴンド男爵夫人, Furgonde-danshaku Fujin)
Voiced by: Kohara Konomi
Mordred Doussant (モルドレッド, Morudoreddo)
Voiced by: Haruki Ishiya (Japanese); Lee George (English)
Posing as an honorable member of the Knight-sorcerer candidates, it's revealed that his father is a baron merchant who sent him as a spy in a bid to claim Cyfandir's land, and a member of the Faithful of the Hermit.

== Media ==
=== Comic ===
The series is written and illustrated by French author Tony Valente. He began the publication of Radiant on Ankama Éditions in July 2013 and currently has 20 volumes released. According to an interview that he made in Just Focus at April 2014, Tony says that his inspirations to create Radiant were Fairy Tail, Naruto, and One Piece. It has been published by Viz Media in English since 2018.

The series is published in Japan by Asukashinsha. Additional languages it has been published in are Spanish by LetraBlanka since 2016, German by Pyramond since 2016, Italian by Mangasenpai since 2017, Serbian by Najkula since 2022 and Swedish by Cobolt Förlag since 2022.

=== Anime ===
NHK announced the series on January 31, 2018. The series was directed by Seiji Kishi and Daisei Fukuoka, and written by Makoto Uezu, with animation done in RETAS software by Nerima-based studio Lerche. Character designs for the series were produced by Nozomi Kawano, while Masato Koda composed the series' music. The opening theme is "Utopia" by 04 Limited Sazabys, while the ending theme is "Radiant" by Polkadot Stingray.

The 21-episode anime series aired on NHK Educational TV from October 6, 2018, to February 23, 2019. It is based on volumes 1 through 4 of the comic. The series is simulcast by Crunchyroll, with Funimation producing an English dub as it aired.

In the season finale, a 21-episode second season has been announced. It aired from October 2, 2019, to February 26, 2020. The opening theme is "Naraku" by Halo at Yojohan, while the ending theme is "Chitto mo Shiranakatta" by Emi Nakamura.

The series received a French dub, which first aired on Game One in France on September 2, 2019.

The anime began airing on ABC Me in Australia on January 2, 2021.
