= List of TV series based on French-language comics =

This is a list of TV series based on French-language comics, that is series and that are adaptations of Francophone comics.

== TV series ==
- Based on 50 Nuances de Grecs:
  - 50 Nuances de Grecs (2018)
- Based on Achille Talon:
  - Walter Melon (1998)
- Based on Agrippine:
  - Agrippine (2001)
- Based on Alix:
  - Alix (1999)
- Based on Anatole Latuile:
  - Anatole Latuile (2018)
- Based on Ariol:
  - Ariol (2009)
- Based on Arzach:
  - Arzak Rhapsody (2003)
- Based on Asterix
  - Dogmatix and the Indomitables (2021)
  - Asterix and Obelix: The Big Fight (2025)
- Based on Basil et Victoria:
  - Orson and Olivia (1993)
- Based on Billy the Cat:
  - Billy the Cat (1996)
- Based on Les Blagues de Toto:
  - Les Blagues de Toto (2010)
- Based on Blake and Mortimer:
  - Blake and Mortimer (1997)
- Based on Les Blondes:
  - Les Blondes (2007)
- Based on Bob Morane:
  - Bob Morane (1965)
  - Bob Morane (1998)
- Based on Boule et Bill:
  - Boule et Bill (1975)
  - Boule et Bill (2000)
  - Boule et Bill (2004)
  - Boule et Bill (2015)
- Based on Les Cahiers d'Esther:
  - Les Cahiers d'Esther (2018)
- Based on Captain Biceps:
  - Captain Biceps (2010)
- Based on Carland Cross:
  - Carland Cross (1996)
- Based on Cédric:
  - Cédric (2001)
- Based on Chlorophylle:
  - The Adventures of Grady Greenspace (1992)
- Based on Les Chronokids:
  - Les Chronokids (2014)
- Based on Corentin:
  - Journey to the Heart of the World (1993)
- Based on Cubitus:
  - Wowser (1989)
- Based on De Gaulle à la plage:
  - De Gaulle à la plage (2020)
- Based on L'Épervier:
  - L'Épervier (2011)
- Based on Franky Snow:
  - Franky Snow (2007)
- Based on Gaston:
  - Gaston (2009)
- Based on Gédéon:
  - Gideon (1976)
- Based on Gowap:
  - Gowap (2003)
- Based on Grabouillon:
  - Grabouillon (2006)
- Based on Grenadine et Mentalo:
  - Grenadine et Mentalo (2011)
- Based on Iznogoud:
  - Iznogoud (1995)
- Based on Jack Palmer:
  - Jack Palmer (2001)
- Based on Jeremiah:
  - Jeremiah (2002-2004)
- Based on Kaput & Zösky:
  - Kaput & Zösky (2002)
- Based on Kid Paddle:
  - Kid Paddle (2003)
- Based on Lanfeust Quest:
  - Lanfeust Quest (2013)
- Based on Largo Winch:
  - Largo Winch (2001)
- Based on Lastman:
  - Lastman (2016)
- Based on The Legendaries:
  - The Legendaries (2017)
- Based on Léonard:
  - Léonard (a.k.a. Contraptus, 2009)
- Based on Little Vampire:
  - Little Vampire (2004)
- Based on Lou!:
  - Lou! (2009)
- Based on Lucky Luke and Rantanplan:
  - Lucky Luke (1983–1984)
  - Lucky Luke (1991)
  - Lucky Luke (1992)
  - The New Adventures of Lucky Luke (2001–2003)
  - Rantanplan (2006)
  - Les Dalton (2010–2015)
- Based on Les Maîtres de l'orge:
  - Les Steenfort, maîtres de l'orge (1996)
- Based on Mandarine and Cow:
  - Mandarine and Cow (a.k.a. Tangerine & Cow, 2007)
- Based on Marsupilami (from Spirou et Fantasio):
  - Marsupilami (1993)
  - Marsupilami (2000)
- Based on Maurice et Patapon:
  - Maurice et Patapon (2010)
- Based on comics from the magazine Métal hurlant:
  - Métal Hurlant Chronicles (2012)
- Based on Michel Vaillant:
  - Les Aventures de Michel Vaillant (1967)
  - Michel Vaillant (1990)
- Based on Mon ami Grompf:
  - Mon ami Grompf (2011)
- Based on La Mouche:
  - Fly Tales (1999)
- Based on Nini Patalo:
  - Nini Patalo (2010)
- Based on OVNI:
  - OVNI (2010)
- Based on Papyrus:
  - Papyrus (1998)
- Based on Les petits diables:
  - Sweet Little Monsters (2012)
- Based on Le Petit Spirou:
  - Petit Spirou (2012)
- Based on Pif le chien:
  - Spiff and Hercules (1989)
- Based on Prudence Petitpas:
  - Prudence Gumshoe (2001)
- Based on Quick & Flupke:
  - Quick & Flupke (1983)
- Based on Rahan:
  - Rahan (1987)
  - Rahan (2008)
- Based on Rani:
  - Rani (2011)
- Based on Redbeard:
  - Barbe Rouge (1997)
- Based on Rita et Machin:
  - Rita et Machin (2010)
- Based on Samson et Néon:
  - Samson et Néon (2010)
- Based on Sardine in Outer Space:
  - Sardine in Outer Space (2020)
- Based on Silex and the City:
  - The Darwinners (2012)
- Based on Les Sisters:
  - Les Sisters (2018)
- Based on The Smurfs and on Johan and Peewit:
  - The Smurfs (1961)
  - The Smurfs (1981)
  - The Smurfs (2021–present)
- Based on Les Souvenirs de Mamette:
  - Les Souvenirs de Mamette (2017)
- Based on Spirou et Fantasio:
  - Spirou et Fantasio (1993)
  - Spirou et Fantasio (2006)
- Based on Tanguy et Laverdure:
  - The Aeronauts (1967–69)
  - Les Nouveaux Chevaliers du ciel (1988)
- Based on Tintin:
  - Hergé's Adventures of Tintin (1958–62)
  - The Adventures of Tintin (1991–92)
- Based on Titeuf:
  - Titeuf (2001)
- Based on Tom-Tom and Nana:
  - Tom-Tom et Nana (1997)
  - Tom-Tom et Nana (2019)
- Based on Tony et Alberto:
  - Tony et Alberto (2011)
- Based on Trolls of Troy:
  - Trolls de Troy (2013)
- Based on Le Transperceneige
  - Snowpiercer (2020–)
- Based on Tu mourras moins bête...:
  - Tu mourras moins bête... (2016)
- Based on Valérian and Laureline:
  - Time Jam: Valerian & Laureline (2006)
- Based on XIII:
  - XIII: The Conspiracy (2008)
  - XIII: The Series (2011)
- Based on Yakari:
  - Yakari (1983)
  - Yakari (2005)
- Based on Yves Sainclair:
  - Les Ailes du dragon (1999)
- Based on Zap Collège:
  - Zap Collège (2006)

== See also ==
- List of television programs based on comics
- List of comic-based television episodes directed by women
- List of television series based on comic strips
- List of films based on French-language comics
- List of films based on comics
- List of films based on comic strips
- List of films based on English-language comics
- List of films based on manga
