= List of films based on French-language comics =

This is a list of films based on French-language comics. It includes films that are adaptations of Francophone comics, and those films whose characters originated in those comics.

== Films ==
=== Series with more than five entries ===
- Based on Asterix:
1. Asterix the Gaul (1967, Animation)
2. Asterix and Cleopatra (1968, Animation)
3. The Twelve Tasks of Asterix (1976, Animation)
4. Asterix Versus Caesar (1985, Animation)
5. Asterix in Britain (1986, Animation)
6. Asterix and the Big Fight (1989, Animation)
7. Asterix Conquers America (1994, Animation)
8. Asterix and Obelix vs. Caesar (1999, Live-action)
9. Asterix & Obelix: Mission Cleopatra (2002, Live-action)
10. Asterix and the Vikings (2006, Animation)
11. Asterix at the Olympic Games (2008, Live-action)
12. Asterix and Obelix: God Save Britannia (2012, Live-action)
13. Asterix: The Mansions of the Gods (2014, Animation)
14. Asterix: The Secret of the Magic Potion (2018, Animation)
15. Asterix & Obelix: The Middle Kingdom (2023, Live-action)
- Based on Lucky Luke:
1. Le Juge (1971, Live-action)
2. Daisy Town (1971, Animation)
3. La Ballade des Dalton (1978, Animation)
4. Les Dalton en cavale (1983, Animation)
5. Lucky Luke (1991, Live-action)
6. Les Dalton (2004, Live-action)
7. Go West! A Lucky Luke Adventure (2007, Animation)
8. Lucky Luke (2009, Live-action)
- Based on The Adventures of Tintin:
1. The Crab with the Golden Claws (1947, Stop-motion Animation)
2. Tintin and the Golden Fleece (1961, Live-action)
3. Tintin and the Blue Oranges (1964, Live-action)
4. Tintin and the Temple of the Sun (1969, Animation)
5. Tintin and the Lake of Sharks (1972, Animation)
6. The Adventures of Tintin (2011, Mo-cap Animation)
- Based on The Smurfs:
1. Les Aventures des Schtroumpfs (1965, Animation)
2. The Smurfs and the Magic Flute (1976, Animation)
3. The Smurfs (2011, Live-action/CGI)
4. The Smurfs 2 (2013, Live-action/CGI)
5. Smurfs: The Lost Village (2017, Animation)
6. Smurfs (2025, Animation)

=== Series with five entries ===
- Based on L'Élève Ducobu:
1. L'Élève Ducobu (2011, Live-Action)
2. Les Vacances de Ducobu (2012, Live-Action)
3. Ducobu 3 (2020, Live-Action)
4. Ducobu Président ! (2022, Live-Action)
5. Ducobu passe au vert (2024, Live-Action)

=== Series with three entries ===
- Based on Bécassine:
1. Bécassine (1940, Live-action)
2. Bécassine et le Trésor viking (2001, Animation)
3. Bécassine (2018, Live-action)
- Based on Largo Winch:
1. Largo Winch (2008, Live-action)
2. Largo Winch II (2011, Live-Action)
3. The Price of Money: A Largo Winch Adventure (2024, Live-action)
- Based on Les Pieds Nickelés:
1. Les Aventures des Pieds-Nickelés (1948, Live-action)
2. Le Trésor des Pieds-Nickelés (1950, Live-action)
3. Les Pieds nickelés (1964, Live-action)

=== Series with two entries ===
- Based on Les Amoureux de Peynet:
1. Si tous les amoureux du monde... (1963, Live-action)
2. Around the World with Peynet's Lovers (1974, Animation)
- Based on Les Aventures de la Famille Anatole:
1. Street Without a King (1950, Live-action)
2. Darling Anatole (1954, Live-action)
- Based on Les Blagues de Toto:
1. Les Blagues de Toto (2020, Live-action)
2. Les Blagues de Toto 2 : Classe verte (2023, Live-action)
- Based on Boule et Bill:
1. Boule et Bill (2013, Live-action)
2. Boule et Bill 2 (2017, Live-action)
- Based on Gaston:
1. Fais gaffe à la gaffe ! (1981, Live-action)
2. Gaston Lagaffe (2018, Live-action)
- Based on Joséphine:
1. Joséphine (2013, Live-action)
2. Joséphine, Pregnant & Fabulous (2016, Live-action)
- Based on the Marsupilami:
  - Houba! On the Trail of the Marsupilami (2012, Live-action)
  - Marsupilami (2026, Live-action)
- Based on Les Profs:
1. Serial Teachers (2013, Live-action)
2. Serial Teachers 2 (2015, Live-action)
- Based on Tamara:
1. Tamara (2016, Live-action)
2. Tamara Vol. 2 (2018, Live-action)
- Based on The Old Geezers:
  - Tricky Old Dogs (2018, Live-action)
  - Tricky Old Dogs 2 (2022, Live-action)

=== One-shot films ===
- Based on 13 rue de l'Espoir:
  - The Dance (1962, Live-action)
- Based on Algues vertes, l'histoire interdite:
  - Les Algues vertes (2023, Live-action)
- Based on L'Amour propre (ne le reste jamais très longtemps):
  - L'amour propre ne le reste jamais très longtemps (1985, Live-action)
- Based on Les Amours célèbres:
  - Famous Love Affairs (1961, Live-action)
- Based on Au nom du fils:
  - Au nom du fils (2015, Live-action)
- Based on Aya of Yop City:
  - Aya of Yop City (2012, Animation)
- Based on Barbarella:
  - Barbarella (1968, Live-action)
- Based on Benoît Brisefer:
  - Benoît Brisefer : Les Taxis rouges (2014, Live-action)
- Based on Bibi Fricotin:
  - Bibi Fricotin (1951, Live-action)
- Based on Les Bidochon:
  - Les Bidochon (1996, Live-action)
- Based on Blue Is the Warmest Color:
  - Blue Is the Warmest Colour (2013, Live-action)
- Based on Blue Pills:
  - Pilules bleues (2014, Live-action)
- Based on Blueberry:
  - Blueberry (2004, Live-action)
- Based on Charly:
  - L'Avion (2005, Live-action)
- Based on Chicken with Plums:
  - Chicken with Plums (2011, Live-action)
- Based on Les Cités obscures:
  - Taxandria (1994, Live-action/CGI)
- Based on Clémentine chérie:
  - Clémentine chérie (1964, Live-action)
- Based on Corps et âme:
  - The Assignment (2016, Live-action)
- Based on Couleur de peau: miel:
  - Approved for Adoption (2012, Animation)
- Based on La Course du rat:
  - Je vais craquer (1980, Live-action)
- Based on La Création du monde (Jean Effel):
  - La Création du monde (1958, Animation)
- Based on Le crime ne paie pas:
  - Le Crime ne paie pas (1962, Live-action)
- Based on Le démon de midi:
  - The Demon Stirs (2005, Live-action)
- Based on Docteur Justice:
  - Docteur Justice (1975, Live-action)
- Based on Dolorès:
  - Dolores (2016, Live-action)
- Based on Du plomb dans la tête:
  - Bullet to the Head (2013, Live-action)
- Based on The Extraordinary Adventures of Adèle Blanc-Sec:
  - The Extraordinary Adventures of Adèle Blanc-Sec (2010, Live-action)
- Based on La Famille Fenouillard:
  - The Fenouillard Family (1961, Live-action)
- Based on La Foire aux immortels:
  - Immortal (2004, Mo-cap Animation)
- Based on Le Grand Méchant Renard:
  - The Big Bad Fox and Other Tales... (2017, Animation)
- Based on Gros Dégueulasse:
  - Gros Dégueulasse (1985, Live-action)
- Based on La Guerre des Lulus:
  - La Guerre des Lulus (2023, Live-action)
- Based on Un homme est mort:
  - Un homme est mort (2018, Animation)
- Based on L'Invitation:
  - L'Invitation (2016, Live-action)
- Based on Iznogoud:
  - Iznogoud (2005, Live-action)
- Based on Jack Palmer:
  - The Corsican File (2004, Live-action)
- Based on Jean-Claude Tergal:
  - Le Nouveau Jean-Claude (2002, Live-action)
- Based on Jesuit Joe:
  - Jesuit Joe (1991, Live-action)
- Based on Jojo:
  - Jojo: The Violet Mystery (2000, Animation)
- Based on Juliette: Or, the Ghosts Return in the Spring:
  - Juliette in Spring (2024, Live-action)
- Based on Junior:
  - Aldo et Junior (1984, Live-action)
- Based on The Killer:
  - The Killer (2023, Live-action)
- Based on The Little Vampire:
  - Little Vampire (2020, Animation)
- Based on Lou!:
  - Lou! Journal infime (2014, Live-action)
- Based on Lulu femme nue:
  - Lulu femme nue (2013, Live-action)
- Based on Lune de guerre:
  - The Wedding Party (2005, Live-action)
- Based on Ma maman est en Amérique, elle a rencontré Buffalo Bill:
  - Ma maman est en Amérique, elle a rencontré Buffalo Bill (2013, Animation)
- Based on Mam'zelle Souris:
  - Mam'zelle Souris (1957, Live-action)
- Based on Mars et Avril:
  - Mars & Avril (2012, Live-action/CGI)
- Based on Michel Vaillant:
  - Michel Vaillant (2003, Live-action)
- Based on La Mort de Staline:
  - The Death of Stalin (2017, Live-action)
- Based on Mutafukaz:
  - Mutafukaz (2017, Animation)
- Based on Natacha:
  - Natacha (presque) hôtesse de l'air (2025, Live-action)
- Based on Sandcastle:
  - Old (2021, Live-action)
- Based on Une nuit de pleine lune:
  - The Owners (2020, Live-action)
- Based on Ordinary Victories:
  - Le Combat ordinaire (2015, Live-action)
- Based on L'Outremangeur:
  - The Overeater (2003, Live-action)
- Based on La Page blanche:
  - Eloïse's Journey (2022, Live-action)
- Based on Paul:
  - Paul à Québec (2015, Live-action)
- Based on Paulette:
  - Paulette, la pauvre petite milliardaire (1986, Live-action)
- Based on Pauvre Richard:
  - Pauvre Richard (2013, Live-action)
- Based on Persepolis:
  - Persepolis (2007, Animation)
- Based on Les Petits Ruisseaux:
  - Wandering Streams (2010, Live-action)
- Based on Le Petit Spirou:
  - Le Petit Spirou (2017, Live-action)
- Based on Polina:
  - Polina (2016, Live-action)
- Based on Quai d'Orsay:
  - The French Minister (2013, Live-action)
- Based on The Rabbi's Cat:
  - The Rabbi's Cat (2011, Animation)
- Based on Raoul Taburin Keeps a Secret:
  - Raoul Taburin a un secret (2019, Live-action)
- Based on Rosalie Blum:
  - Rosalie Blum (2016, Live-action)
- Based on Seuls:
  - Seuls (2017, Live-action)
- Based on Une sœur:
  - Falcon Lake (2022, Live-action)
- Based on Souvenirs d'un jeune homme:
  - P'tit Con (1984, Live-action)
- Based on Spirou et Fantasio:
  - Les Aventures de Spirou et Fantasio (2018, Live-action)
- Based on Tanguy et Laverdure:
  - Sky Fighters (2005, Live-action)
- Based on La Tête dans le sac:
  - La Tête dans le sac (1984, Live-action)
- Based on Titeuf:
  - Titeuf (2011, Animation)
- Based on Tranches de vie:
  - Slices of Life (1985, Live-action)
- Based on Le Transperceneige:
  - Snowpiercer (2013, Live-action/CGI)
- Based on Valérian and Laureline:
  - Valerian and the City of a Thousand Planets (2017, Live-action/CGI)
- Based on V comme engeance:
  - Heiss-Kalt (1993, Live-action)
- Based on Vive les femmes!:
  - Vive les femmes ! (1984, Live-action)
- Based on La Grande Odalisque:
  - Wingwomen (2023, Live-action)
- Based on Women Have Only One Thing on Their Minds:
  - Elles ne pensent qu'à ça... (1994, Live-action)
- Based on XIII:
  - XIII: The Conspiracy (2008, Live-action)
- Based on Yakari:
  - Yakari, A Spectacular Journey (2020, Animation)
- Based on Zai zai zai zai:
  - Zai zai zai zai (2020, Live-action)
- Based on Zombillenium:
  - Zombillenium (2017, Animation)

== See also ==
- List of films based on English-language comics
- List of films based on manga

Also related:

- List of TV series based on French-language comics
- List of films based on comic strips
- List of fiction works made into feature films
- List of comic-based films directed by women
- List of Franco-Belgian comics series
