= HugoDécrypte in Russia =

French graphic novel by Hugo Travers

Publication information
- Publisher: Allary Éditions
- Publication date: November 4, 2025

HugoDécrypte in Russia (French: HugoDécrypte en Russie) is a French graphic novel that depicts the history of Russia over the past 1,000 years, highlighting the country's major historical figures.

The book was created by Hugo Travers and his team, with a script written by Kris, artwork by Kokopello, and colors by Christian Lerolle. Published by Allary Éditions, the graphic novel sold over 100,000 copies by June 2026.

The historical accuracy of the narrative was reviewed by four prominent historians specializing in Russian history: Anne de Tinguy, Alexandre Sumpf, Elena Pavel, and Pierre Gonneau.

The work draws parallels between real historical events and contemporary political discourse in Russia. It incorporates humor alongside a simplistic artistic style.

== Reception ==
In January 2026, the comic ranked first in sales on Amazon France.

The book generated political controversy, drawing criticism from figures close to the Russian government, while Jean-Noël Barrot, the French Minister for Europe and Foreign Affairs, recommended reading it.
