= Carland Cross (disambiguation) =

Carland Cross is a settlement in Cornwall, UK.

Carland Cross may also refer to:

- Carland Cross (Character), in the TV series
- Carland Cross (TV series)
