= Technikart =

French cultural magazine

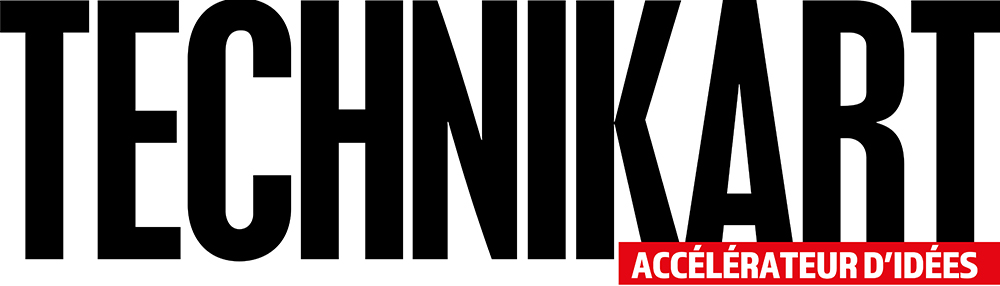
Technikart logo

Technikart is a French cultural magazine launched in 1991.

== History ==
The magazine was launched in 1991 by Fabrice de Rohan Chabot, Guillaume de Roquemaurel and Raphaël Turcat. Focused on contemporary art, it was distributed free in art galleries. Paid distribution in magazine stands started in 1995, and the editorial line opened up to all contemporary cultural events. Its editorial line became somewhat similar to Les Inrockuptibles, but saltier, more provocative. It covered and sometimes revealed new trends with the intent to emulate its predecessor Actuel (magazine founded by Jean-François Bizot) in becoming the reference of the French underground culture.

The magazine's first journalists were Philippe Nassif and Charles Pépin (from Les Inrockuptibles), Patrick Williams (from Best), Olivier Malnuit (from Interactif) and Jacques Braunstein (from Globe).

Advertising revenue boomed in 2000, and its sales peaked in 2003 at 41,200 issues printed monthly. It then slowly decreased, dropping to 35,000 in 2014. It was delisted by the OJD in 2008.

The magazine launched in China in 2010, and in the United States in 2011. In 2012, Technikart was heavily criticized for trashing the inhabitants of the Jura region. By the end of 2014, the magazine was failing financially. Distribution fell 12,4% that year. The magazine struggled with the rise of social networks and the multiplication of edgy cultural magazines, and with a decreasing ad revenue. In 2015, Technikart launched the standalone magazine Grand Seigneur focused on cuisine and wine. In January 2016, Laurent Courbin (CEO of Ateo Finance, finance software company) bought Technikart for 270,000 euros in a move to diversify his assets. He did not announce plans to change the editorial line. In 2019, the magazine changed its baseline, layout, size (larger) and type of paper (thicker).
