= Mohammed Al-Rufrafi =

- Born: December 2, 1950 (age 75)

Mohamed Al-Rufrafi, an Arab poet, writer, media and translator living in exile, born in Tunis, 2 December 1950, resided in several countries before settling in France in 1984. In parallel with the journalistic work, he devoted his work to writing, translating and various cultural and artistic events, from Paris and through European and Arab cities.

== Life ==
=== The Tunisian experience ===
His full name is Mohamed al-Bashir bin Mukhtar Al-Rirvi and his nickname is Raffarfa (a coastal city in northern Tunisia) from which his ancestors came from the father's side and they are of Andalusian-Mursiki origin. Before leaving Tunisia in 1975, he began his four-year career in the field of media, as a journalist in the field of theatre, music and painting and translator in Tunisian Arabic-speaking newspapers and magazines, most of which disappeared or changed its name, and at the same time continued his university studies at the Tunis College of Arts and the Institute of Journalism and News Science, a study he dropped in the 1980s to complete in the 1980s with the goal of obtaining bachelor's (leave) in Arabic language and literature, including a master's degree in the same article with a message about "The City of Arabic Poetry" and the Institute of Journalism and News Sciences, a study he had to complete in the 1980s with the aim of obtaining bachelor's degree in Arabic language and literature, including a master's degree in the same article with a message about "The City of Arabic Poetry." Inalco, the French Institute of Oriental Languages and Civilizations (INALCO) of the University of Sorbonne-Paris-Medina, was supervised by Professors Luc Deheuvels and Sobhi Bustani.

=== The Arab and European Experience ===
From Tunisia, Mohamed Al-Rafrafi emigrated to Arab capitals and cities, bright and maghreb. For nearly five years, he spent nearly five years in Baghdad, studying philosophy at her university, where, after completing her first term, he chose to leave for Beirut, where he re-embarked on his media and cultural work at the height of the civil war and within the institutions of the Lebanese and Palestinian national movement at that time. This experience was subsequently ledby the Swedish authorities, whose right-wing government refused to allow him to remain in Sweden after one year of his stay in Stockholm, a club that has since been transformed into a political attraction between various Arab opposition groups until he split into various Arab clubs. Mohamed Raffarfi's stay in Tunisia, which was living in the early 1980s, did not last long under the late President Bourguiba, most notably the so-called Gafsa operation, which was suspended upon arrival from Stockholm and his passport withdrawn, but under pressure from the Swedish parliamentary opposition and Amnesty International and the accompanying media campaign in support of him, he was soon released. His short cooperation in Tunisia with the newspaper Al Rai, which was run by opposition leader Hassib Ben Ammar and then worked as a political and cultural correspondent from Tunisia for Arab weekly such as "Future" and "Arab Position" Cyprus, had a negative impact on his personal situation, which led him to leave Tunisia again and go with his Tunisian wife to Cyprus in 1983, where he worked for the Nicosia-based Magazine "Arab Position" as editor-in-chief of The Arab Maghreb, European and African Affairs. After a Cyprus year he moved to France where he was appointed by this magazine as director of its Paris office.

=== Expand Media Activity ===
From Paris, his media experience as a reporter, editor and commentator extended to include local, immigrant and international Arab media, such as incidents, "All Arabs", "Al-Wasat" and "Al-Wasat" and "Al-Frank" Tunisian, as well as Tunisian radio and Radio France International Arab Program. He also contributed culturally to the Palestinian magazine Carmel, "Arabs and World Thought", "Contemporary Arab Thought", and the magazine "Poetic Movement" published from Mexico by the poet Kaiser Afif and "Al-Masar" magazine union of Tunisian writers, and this experience extended to the television field through the cultural program "Space of Lights" prepared and presented on the satellite network Arab News Network (Arab News Network) from London. He has exhibited some cultural events, festivals and dozens of meetings with Arab intellectual and art elites over the last three years of the last century, in Paris. Tunisia, Cairo, Amman and Baghdad.

== Creative works ==
Zabad Al-Bahour is a poetry diwan issued in Arabic by the French publishing house Larmatan 1996, in the free word series, a series that was initially allocated by the publisher to the writers of Iraq, who were deprived of publication because of the embargo in the 1990s, and then opened it to Arab writers in general. 150 pages containing poems and texts attached to special drawings by the Syrian artist Youssef Abdelki which was mentioned in the cover of the Diwan that it was written between 1977 and 1996.

=== Excerpts from his poetry ===
From the fourth page of the cover of his diwana, butter of the seas, we read:

With poetry,

Weave you from the threads of the sun tent,

For meditation and serenity,

And I'm picking you up from the sea gardens.

Cloud,

to breed and leave.

With poetry,

I don't leave, I don't stay,

Every place is my home.

When he's familiar with me,

And I'm not going to make it when I'm familiar with it

I'm not going to do that.

=== Testimonies about him and his poetry ===
- Raf Mohammed Al-Rirvi as a "silent" intellectual has practiced many creative forms over the last quarter century and his diwan "Butter of the Seas" is characterized by its diversity in the way he writes the modern poetic poem, to the extent that he mixes with his reader between the form of the poem and the "poetic speech".

(Samuel Chamoun, "Arab Jerusalem" London, January 21, 1997)

- Mohamed Raffarfi belongs to the Tunisian generation of the 1970s, but from the beginning he remained completely different from the poets of his generation. He wrote and continues to be a poem that is different in form and content... He was also familiar with international poetry, and continued with new experiences in the Orient. In the early 1970s, Mohamed El-Rafravi left Tunisia to live in various Arab and European countries. The life of travelling made him less in writing, and he abandoned poetry for years, turning to the troubles of life... However, he was able to occupy his position as the owner of one of the distinct voices in Tunisian and Maghreb poetry. Abdel Fattah Khalil, London weekly al-Wasat: January 27, 1997, issue 261)
- The hair of "Rifrafi" is above weight and above the old and modern references, it is the hair of life and hair... Poetry here is never subject to the place in its constant and stimulating movement, and it rejects the sinus of things. (Mohamed El Ghazali, Al-Masar, The State of the Union of Tunisian Writers, October 1997, double issue 32–33)
- Mohammed Al-Rirafi chose from the beginning two gates: the first opens its horizons to write a different poetry that is based on music and the second led to the knowledge of the springs of creative experiences west and bright after the man floated in more than the capital and city until he settled in the "capital of light" Paris. (Habib Chebbi, Tunisian observer magazine, January 10, 1998).
- L'écume des vers (Butter of the Seas) this collection of poems, which is in French, is translated by Mohamed Moumen and Hadia Al-Daridi from the texts of The Butter of The Seas, as well as texts written by the poet in French, published by the same French publishing house Larmatan French in 2009. In a series (poets from five continents)
- The Big Boy: A solidarity partnership with 31 writers and writers from the Arab scene in the author of a group book entitled "A Book Saves a Child", with a narrative text entitled "The Big Boy", page 111; published in 180 pages by The Arab House of Science Publishers, Beirut, Lebanon, 2015.

The publisher of the fourth newspaper of the cover says about the purpose of the publication of this book:

"A collection of letters and articles aimed at Arab childhood, written in a book entitled "A Book That Saves a Child", and the proceeds of its profits go back to the tortured Arab childhood... We are invited to turn the title of the book into a reality to soothe the wounds of childhood and bring back the smile to her face, perhaps to re-shape her future."

== Translation works ==
The translation work from and out of French, completed by Mohamed Al-Rifafi for nearly four decades, dealt with a variety of fields of knowledge, including poetry, thought, art and politics... Some have been published in books and some in different periodicals. Some were carried out in collaboration with the French Ministry of Culture and UNESCO, most notably:

=== In poetry ===
- Translation of the complete works of the French poet Stéphane Malarmé, part of which was published in Arabic under the title "The Seasons of Malarme" in the magazine "Arabs and World Thought" by the National Development Center, Beirut, autumn 1990. This translation was supported by the "Department of Books and Reading" of the French Ministry of Culture.
- Translation of the "Aguafuertes" by the Spanish poet Federico Mayor Zaragoza, published by eaux Fortes at The Rich Publishing Foundation Rabat Morocco 1997.
- Diwan's translation of "Like a Confession from a Stone" by The French-Portuguese poet Josiane de Jaso-Berger, published in 2003 in a bilingual edition (Arabic and French) by the French publishing house Romor de Zag.
- Translation of an anthology of Cypriot poetry, old and new, parts of which were published in the Cyprus 1983 Cyprus Journal of The Arab Attitude and the London Accidents Magazine 1988.
- Review, in conjunction with Josiane de Jaso-Berger, for the translation by Hadia Al-Daridi from Arabic to French by the Iraqi poet Wafa Abdul Razzaq, "Memoirs of the Child of War" Mémoires de l'enfant de la guerre published by the French publishing house L'Harmattan.
- Just as poems were translated into Arabic by Tunisians such as Moncef Ghesham, Taher Bakri, Raouf Raisi and French such as Paul Elwar, Jean-Pierre Faye, Jules Subarviel, Laurent Gaspard [French] and René Char. Braille, the French poet and singer Savo, who performed two of her songs in Arabic, was translated and included in one of her records, and also translated into French poems by Palestinian poet Mahmoud Darwish and Tunisian poets such as Khaled Najjar, Bashir Al-Qahwaji and Aisha Al-Khodraoui.

=== In thought ===
- Translation of le plaisir du texte by the French thinker Roland Barthes, published in Arabic in the magazine "Arabs and World Thought" by the National Development Center, Beirut (10th issue of Rabie (1990) and was based on a review of the translation of Dr. Mohamed Khair Al-Bekaai, compared to a translation by Dar Toubkal of Morocco.

=== In politics ===
- Translation of the book "The Détente between the United States and the Soviet Union" USA-URSS la détente by the French historian Anne de Tinguy, about the Belgian-French Publications of The Belgian-French Complexe, published in the magazine "Arab Attitude" in Cyprus, 1985.
- Translation of Le Pouvoir et la Vie(1988) Memoirs of the Former French President.
- Translation of field research entitled "A Strategy for Sustainable Development in the Field of Desert Tourism" by Tunisian researcher Ezzedine Hosni, translated in French and published by UNESCO 2000.

== Contributions ==
- "Hadith al-Ouartr": the name of a poetry musical show that he combined, on the knees, Tunisian artist kamenja musician Walid Gharbi and a group of violinists, law, oud and slavery as part of the "Medina Festival" (1998), organized annually by the Municipality of Tunis in Ramadan. He contributed to it with a historical and poetic text that dealt with the history of music in The City of Tunis and its transformations over the course of a century.
- "Fine Arts and Multimedia": the title of a lecture given in the summer of 2000 in the Tunisian city of Sfax as part of his contributions to the "International Festival of Fine Arts" held annually in the coastal city of Al-Mahris, south of Sfax.
- A "visit to break the siege" of Libya at the head of a delegation from France that included French and Arab figures from prominent intellectuals and artists (including the philosopher Jean-Pierre Faye and novelist Yves Frémion [French] included participation in the first spring festival in 1997.
- A "visit to break the embargo" on Iraq, during which he covered some of the events of the 1998 Marbad Poetry Festival and held meetings with Iraqi, Arab and foreign writers, which were shown in his television show "Space of Lights" on the Arab News Network.

== Association and Institutional Activities ==
His activities in this field have spanned nearly 20 years, starting as a media consultant and translator from Paris for the Center for National Development based in Beirut, Lebanon, an institution run by Arab thinker Muta'a Safadi, which publishes the magazines "Contemporary Arab Thought" and "Arabs and World Thought". He was also a member of the Press Club in Paris at the beginning of its founding. He then worked as a media consultant in charge of relations with Arab media at the Arab-European Mobile League, headed by Professor Mohamed Aziza. At the level of Tunisian activity in the diaspora, he chaired the Tunisian Cultural Committee in France for one year (1995/96), succeeding Tunisian writer Taher El Bakri. He also succeeded him at the head of the European branch of the Union of Tunisian Writers, which included well-known Tunisian names such as Mohamed Aziza, the late Afif Al-Akhdar, the late Abdelwahab Al-Madab, Albert Meme, Lucian H.E. Fawzia Zaouri, Hala Al-Baji, Abu Bakr al-Ayadi, the late Mohamed Ghazali and Al-Hadaji El Sayed... However, after a dispute with the presidency of the Union in Tunisia, he resigned from the presidency of the European branch to establish another independent migrant union under the name "Book of Tunisians of Europe" in accordance with writers and researchers such as Afif Ben Abdeslam, Ayadi Shabir, Ashour Ben Poor, Abu Bakr al-Ayadi and the late Mohamed El Ghazali.
