= Yakari (2005 TV series) =

2000s animated series

- Series Poster
- Genre: Action-adventure
- Based on: Yakari by: Job; Derib
- Directed by: Xavier Giacometti
- Theme music composer: Gil Slavin
- Composer: Hervé Lavandier
- Countries of origin: France; Belgium; Germany (seasons 3–5)
- No. of seasons: 5
- No. of episodes: 156

Production
- Executive producers: Paulette Smeuls; Jean-Michel Spiner; Robert Réa (season 3); Marie-Perrie Moulinjeune (season 3); Caroline Duvochel (seasons 4–5)
- Producers: Maïa Tubiana (seasons 4–5); Leon Perhaia (seasons 4–5)
- Running time: 13 minutes
- Production companies: Storimages; Belvision Studios; Ellipsanime (seasons 3–5); ARD (seasons 3–5); Studio 2 Minutes; Les Cartooneurs Associés (season 4); Dargaud Media (season 5)

Original release
- Network: France 3/Télétoon+ (France); RTBF (Belgium)
- Release: December 24, 2005 – November 29, 2017

Related
- Yakari (1983 TV series)

Yakari is a 2005 animated television series based on the Franco-Belgian comics of the same name created by Job and Derib. The show debuted on 24 December 2005 on France 3.

== Synopsis ==
This series features the adventures of Yakari, a little Sioux Native American, and his faithful steed, Little Thunder, in the great prairie. Yakari has the ability to communicate with all animals, a gift that was transmitted to him by his totem, the Great Eagle.

== Episodes ==
=== Season 1 (2005–06) ===
No.	Title	Original release date
1	"Yakari and the Great Eagle" (French: Yakari et Grand-Aigle)	October 1, 2005
2	"Yakari and Little Thunder" (French: Yakari et Petit-Tonnerre)	October 8, 2005
3	"First Gallop" (French: Le Premier Galop)	October 15, 2005
4	"Yakari in the Land of the Wolves" (French: Yakari au pays des loups)	October 22, 2005
5	"Lord of the Plains" (French: Les Seigneurs des plaines)	October 29, 2005
6	"The Stranger" (French: Yakari et l'étranger)	November 5, 2005
7	"Flight of the Crows" (French: Le Vol des corbeaux)	November 7, 2005
8	"The Devil in the Woods" (French: Le Diable des bois)	November 19, 2005
9	"The Raging Sky" (French: La Fureur du ciel)	November 26, 2005
10	"Land of Sorrow" (French: La Rivière de l'oubli)	December 3, 2006
11	"White Fleece" (French: La Toison blanche)	December 10, 2005
12	"The Cloud Blower" (French: Le Souffleur de nuages)	December 17, 2005
13	"The Lake Monster" (French: Le Monstre du lac)	December 24, 2005
14	"Revenge of the Wolverine" (French: La Vengeance du Carcajou)	December 31, 2005
15	"Yakari Visit the Beavers" (French: Yakari chez les castors)	January 7, 2006
16	"Yakari and the Grizzly" (French: Yakari et le grizzli)	January 14, 2006
17	"Stuck on an Island" (French: Les Prisonniers de l'île)	January 21, 2006
18	"The wall of fire" (French: La Barrière de feu)	January 28, 2006
19	"Yakari and the Coyote" (French: Yakari et le Coyote)	February 4, 2006
20	"The Great Burrow" (French: Le Grand Terrier)	February 11, 2006
21	"Yakari and the Condor" (French: Le Mystère de la falaise)	February 18, 2006
22	"A Coyote with No Name" (French: Yakari et le Condor)	February 25, 2006
23	"The Mystery of the Cliff Face" (French: Le Coyote qui n'a pas de nom)	March 4, 2006
24	"Little Thunder's Secret" (French: Le Secret de Petit-Tonnerre)	March 11, 2006
25	"Rainbow the Snake" (French: Le Serpent arc-en-ciel)	March 18, 2006
26	"Yakari and the Ghost Boar" (French: Yakari et l'Ours fantôme)	March 25, 2006
27	"The unknown fisherman" (French: Le Pêcheur inconnu)	April 1, 2006
28	"The talking Oak" (French: Le Chêne qui parlait)	April 8, 2006
29	"The strange pony" (French: L'Étrange Poney)	April 15, 2006
30	"The flying thief" (French: Le Voleur volant)	April 22, 2006
31	"Buffalo Seeds runs away" (French: La Fugue de Graine-de-Bison)	April 29, 2006
32	"Long Bow" (French: Grand-Arc)	May 6, 2006
33	"The singing branc" (French: Le bois qui chante)	May 13, 2006
34	"The spirit mask" (French: Le Masque fantôme)	May 20, 2006
35	"Like the wind" (French: Le Fils du vent)	May 27, 2006
36	"The Sacred Stone" (French: La Pierre sacrée)	June 3, 2006
37	"Friends for Life" (French: Amis pour la vie)	June 10, 2006
38	"The lost flute" (French: La Flûte perdue)	June 17, 2006
39	"The moon spirit" (French: Esprit de lune)	June 24, 2006
40	"A Promise Is a Promise" (French: Yakari et l'Ourse piquée)	July 1, 2006
41	"Yakari and the Angry Bear" (French: L'Incroyable sauvetage)	July 8, 2006
42	"The Incredible Rescue" (French: Le Défi de roc tranquille)	July 15, 2006
43	"Restful Rock's Challenge" (French: L'Étoile des plaines)	July 22, 2006
44	"The Prairie Starflower" (French: Le Loup qui se couche)	July 29, 2006
45	"Cringing Wolf" (French: Le Marcheur de nuit)	August 5, 2006
46	"White Fur" (French: Les Yeux mystérieux)	August 12, 2006
47	"The Sleepwalker" (French: Yakari et le Vieux Bison)	August 26, 2006
48	"Mysterious Eyes" (French: Le Fils de l'aigle)	September 2, 2006
49	"The Old Buffalo" (French: Le Grand Mustang)	September 9, 2006
50	"Son of the Eagle" (French: La Flèche rouge)	September 16, 2006
51	"The Big Mustang" (French: Chose promise)	September 23, 2006
52	"Red Arrow" (French: Les Fourrures blanches)	September 30, 2006

=== Season 2 (2007) ===
No.	Title	Original release date
1	(French: La Trace du bison)	September 5, 2007
2	(French: Père et Fils)	September 6, 2007
3	(French: Le Morceau d'étoile)	September 12, 2007
4	(French: La Piste des voleurs)	September 13, 2007
5	(French: Le Chant du corbeau)	September 19, 2007
6	(French: Le Fracas de l'oiseau-tonnerre)	September 20, 2007
7	(French: La Chevauchée de roc tranquille)	September 26, 2007
8	(French: Le Don à la tribu)	September 27, 2007
9	(French: Sauvez la couvé)	October 3, 2007
10	(French: Le Nouveau-né)	October 4, 2007
11	(French: Le Sacrifice d'Arc-en-Ciel)	October 10, 2007
12	(French: La dernière promenade d'Esprit de Lune)	October 11, 2007
13	(French: Le Chasseur d'argile)	October 17, 2007
14	(French: La Griffe de l'ours)	October 18, 2007
15	(French: Les Graines de soleil)	October 24, 2007
16	(French: Cristal, Écaille, Plume)	October 25, 2007
17	(French: L'Attrape-rêves)	October 31, 2007
18	(French: Tilleul est grand)	November 1, 2007
19	(French: Entre chien et loup)	November 7, 2007
20	(French: L'Œuf de serpent)	November 8, 2007
21	(French: La Corne de bison)	November 14, 2007
22	(French: Le Pélican et les Pêcheurs)	November 15, 2007
23	(French: Le Grand Nid)	November 21, 2007
24	(French: L'Empreinte du géant)	November 22, 2007
25	(French: L'Œil du lynx)	November 28, 2007
26	(French: Éclats de lumière)	November 29, 2007

=== Season 3 (2012) ===
No.	Title	Original release date
1	(French: L'Escapade de l'ourson)	September 5, 2012
2	(French: Le Marais de la peur)	September 6, 2012
3	(French: La Chèvre fugueuse)	September 12, 2012
4	(French: Les Sept Feux)	September 13, 2012
5	(French: Un trésor trop lourd)	September 19, 2012
6	(French: Le Réveil du géant)	September 20, 2012
7	(French: Comme deux frères)	September 26, 2012
8	(French: Yakari et l'ours insomniaque)	September 27, 2012
9	(French: La Rivière empoisonnée)	October 3, 2012
10	(French: Les Étranges Rencontres d'Arc-en-Ciel)	October 4, 2012
11	(French: L'Éclaireur des plaines)	October 10, 2012
12	(French: Papoose perché)	October 11, 2012
13	(French: Yakari et le Sasquatsch)	October 17, 2012
14	(French: Le Rocher mystérieux)	October 18, 2012
15	(French: La Quête de la vision)	October 24, 2012
16	(French: Les Plumes de gaieté)	October 25, 2012
17	(French: La Meute sans chef)	October 31, 2012
18	(French: Yakari face à Front-de-Bois)	November 1, 2012
19	(French: Les Chasseurs de PUMA)	November 7, 2012
20	(French: Les Oiseaux voleurs de soleil)	November 8, 2012
21	(French: L'Oiseau moqueur)	November 14, 2012
22	(French: Nuage rouge)	November 15, 2012
23	(French: Le Labyrinthe de pierre)	November 21, 2012
24	(French: Le Chiot perdu)	November 22, 2012
25	(French: Cornes fourchues)	November 28, 2012
26	(French: Chèvres des montagnes)	November 29, 2012

=== Season 4 (2016) ===
No.	Title	Original release date
1	"The Blue Horse" (French: L'honneur de la tribu)	September 5, 2016
2	"The Clumsy Raccoon" (French: La colère des corbeaux)	September 6, 2016
3	"Stone the Crows" (French: La longue marche d'Oeil-de-Bouillon)	September 12, 2016
4	"The Long Walk of Eyes-Always-Shot" (French: La peur de Grand-gris)	September 13, 2016
5	"The Honor of the Tribe" (French: La pierre du calumet)	September 19, 2016
6	"A Thirst for Life" (French: Patte blanche)	September 20, 2016
7	"The Stone Calumet" (French: Le cheval bleu)	September 26, 2016
8	"Beaver Dam Sabotage" (French: Le raton maladroit)	September 27, 2016
9	"Great- Greys Fear" (French: Vol plané !)	October 3, 2016
10	"The Trouble with Wolverine" (French: Sabotage chez les castors)	October 4, 2016
11	"Many-Mouths Missing Memory" (French: Yakari et les bois de velours)	October 10, 2016
12	"The Grizzly Bear Hunt" (French: La piste du puma)	October 11, 2016
13	"The Spirit Clearing" (French: La mémoire de Mille-Gueules)	October 17, 2016
14	"Yakari and the Antler Velvet" (French: Tout à l'envers)	October 18, 2016
15	"The Puma's Pawprints" (French: Les ennuis du carcajou)	October 24, 2016
16	"The Big White Crow" (French: Un ours très paresseux)	October 25, 2016
17	"The Brave Papoose" (French: La clairière aux esprits)	October 31, 2016
18	"Headache at the Hot Springs" (French: L'étrange phénomène)	November 1, 2016
19	"The Big Day Out" (French: La chasse au grizzli)	November 7, 2016
20	"White Paw" (French: Le sommeil du carcajou)	November 8, 2016
21	"The Sleepy Wolverine" (French: Le papoose courageux)	November 14, 2016
22	"The Strange Phenomenon" (French: Le tomahawk sacré)	November 15, 2016
23	"The Sacred Tomahawk" (French: Le grand corbeau blanc)	November 21, 2016
24	"All Back-to-Front" (French: En route vers les sources chaudes)	November 22, 2016
25	"Free Fall" (French: La grande soif)	November 28, 2016
26	"A Bear with a Sore Head" (French: La première grande escapade)	November 29, 2016

=== Season 5 (2017) ===
No.	Title	Original release date
1	"The Sun Tree" (French: L'arbre soleil)	September 5, 2017
2	"Some Friend You Are" (French: Un drôle d'ami)	September 6, 2017
3	"Chasing the Turquoise" (French: À la poursuite de la turquoise)	September 12, 2017
4	"The Stones that Speak" (French: Les pierres qui parlent)	September 13, 2017
5	"The Good Seed" (French: La bonne graine)	September 19, 2017
6	"Save the Spikes" (French: Plus vite que le vent)	September 20, 2017
7	"Faster than the Wind" (French: Un duo surprenant)	September 26, 2017
8	"War between Chiefs" (French: Le bec de l'aigle)	September 27, 2017
9	"Droopy-Ear" (French: Les deux font la paire)	October 3, 2017
10	"A Guide in the Darkness" (French: La harde en détresse)	October 4, 2017
11	"An Unlikely Duo" (French: Le ruban rouge)	October 10, 2017
12	"In Search of the Snow Trees" (French: Les bâtisseurs de tipis)	October 11, 2017
13	"Great-Yakari" (French: La voix du papoose)	October 17, 2017
14	"Free-Horse" (French: Cheval-Libre)	October 18, 2017
15	"Dance of the Lynx" (French: Guerre des chefs)	October 24, 2017
16	"Silence is Golden" (French: La danse du lynx)	October 25, 2017
17	"Wild-Wind's Secret" (French: Le secret de Vent-Sauvage)	October 31, 2017
18	"The Flying Bear Cub" (French: Oreille-Tombante)	November 1, 2017
19	"Under Eagle's Beak" (French: Sauve qui pique !)	November 7, 2017
20	"Two's Company" (French: Un guide dans la nuit)	November 8, 2017
21	"SOS: Herd in Distress" (French: À la recherche des arbres à neige)	November 14, 2017
22	"The Red Ribbon" (French: L'ourson volant)	November 15, 2017
23	"The Winged totem" (French: La coiffe du che)	November 21, 2017
24	"The Teepee Builders" (French: Roc-Tranquille et le coyote)	November 22, 2017
25	"The Chiefs Headdress" (French: Grand-Yakar)	November 28, 2017
26	"Restful Rock and the Coyote" (French: Le totem ailé)	November 29, 2017

== Animation ==
Co-producer 2 Mintues originally handled animation services for the first three seasons alongside while Belanim Animation provided outside animation work for the first three seasons.

When the series became 2D/CGI hybrid-animated series for the final two seasons, the animation services was moved in-house with Ellipsanime Productions and Storimages' fellow Angoulême-based animation production studio Ellipse Studio Angoulême and Belgian animation studio DreamWall (whom would later provide animation services for the film Yakari, A Spectacular Journey) had taken over the series' animation services while 2 Minutes continued handling some animation services as Malil'Art Productions (an animation studio also based in Angoulême) started providing 2D background layouts.
