= Belattar =

Belattar is a surname. Notable people with the surname include:

- Sofia Belattar (born 1995), Moroccan judoka
- Yassine Belattar (born 1982), French television presenter
