= Yakari, A Spectacular Journey =

- Original theatrical release poster
- Yakari, la grande aventure
- Directed by: Xavier Giacometti; Toby Genkel (co-director)
- Written by: Xavier Giacometti
- Starring: Diana Amft
- Music by: Guillaume Poyet
- Production companies: Dargaud Media; Wunder Werk; Belvision; BAC Films Production; France 3 Cinéma; Leonine Studios; WDR; Gao Shan Pictures; Dupuis Audiovisuel
- Distributed by: BAC Films (France); Leonine Distribution (Germany)
- Release date: August 12, 2020; (France)
- Running time: 83 minutes
- Countries: France; Germany; Belgium
- Language: French

Yakari, A Spectacular Journey is a 2020 French-Belgian-German animated film directed by Xavier Giacometti. It was distributed by BAC Films. The film is an adaptation of Yakari, the Belgian comic book series, originally written by Job and illustrated by Derib, both from Switzerland.

== Plot ==
Yakari, a little Sioux Native American boy, and his faithful steed, Little Thunder, in the great prairie. Yakari has the ability to communicate with all animals, a gift that was transmitted to him by his totem, the Great Eagle. The tribe's migration is imminent. Yakari the little Sioux leaves the protective circle of his village and heads off into the unknown to follow the trail of Little Thunder, the legendary mustang. Yakari absolutely wants to become the friend of this little horse reputed to be untamable. On the way, Yakari will be visited by Great Eagle, his totem animal, from whom he will receive a superb feather of bravery and a fantastic gift: that of being able to speak with animals. This quest will take the little Sioux across the plains and mountains of the North American continent, passing through the territory of the terrible puma-skin hunters. But how will he find his way back to his tribe? At the end of the journey, the breath of adventure will forever seal the friendship between the bravest of papooses and the mustang faster than the wind. Inspired by the first comic book album, "Yakari et grand-Aigle", by Derib and Job, released fifty years ago, this first feature film of 2020 traces the genesis of this young timeless hero. A second feature film is in preparation, it will be released on screens in 2026.

== Cast ==
- Diana Amft
- Callum Malloney (US/Irish)
- Oscar Douieb
- Alan Stanford (Irish)
- Martin Sheen (US)
- Kathleen Renish
- Tara Flynn (US/Irish)
- Hans Sigl
- Joey D'Auria (US)
- Tom Trouffier
- Paul Tylak (US/Irish)

== Production ==
Development for Yakari: A Spectacular Journey was announced in June 2018 during the Annecy International Animation Film Festival in that year, when France Télévisions announced its animated film & television state with the broadcasting company announcing a feature film adaptation of the Yakari comic book series and its TV adaptation of the same name, with film directors & screenwriters Toby Genkel and Xavier Giacometti serving as directors for the film with Dargaud's animation production division Dargaud Media (whom produced the fifth season of Yakari) and Belgian film & television studio Belvision (which produced the TV series for the entire run) co-producing alongside Ordenberg-based German kids & family entertainment company WunderWerk, Reunion-based Gao Shan Pictures and France 3's film unit France 3 Cinema, while BAC Films and German distribution company Universum Film would distribute the film in its home countries while its production unit BAC Film Production would co-produce alongside the latter.

=== Animation ===
Like the final two seasons of the TV series Yakari, the animation services was provided in-house by Dargaud Media and Dupuis Edition & Audiovisuel's fellow Angoulême-based animation production studio Ellipse Studio Angoulême and Belgian animation studio DreamWall (whom the two had handled animation services on the TV series), who handled animation production services for the feature film alongside German entertainment company Wunderwerk and Réunion-based French animation studio Gao Shan Pictures

== Reception ==
The film was one of the few films released in 2020 to be a box office success.
