= André Geerts =

Belgian comic writer and artist (1955–2010)

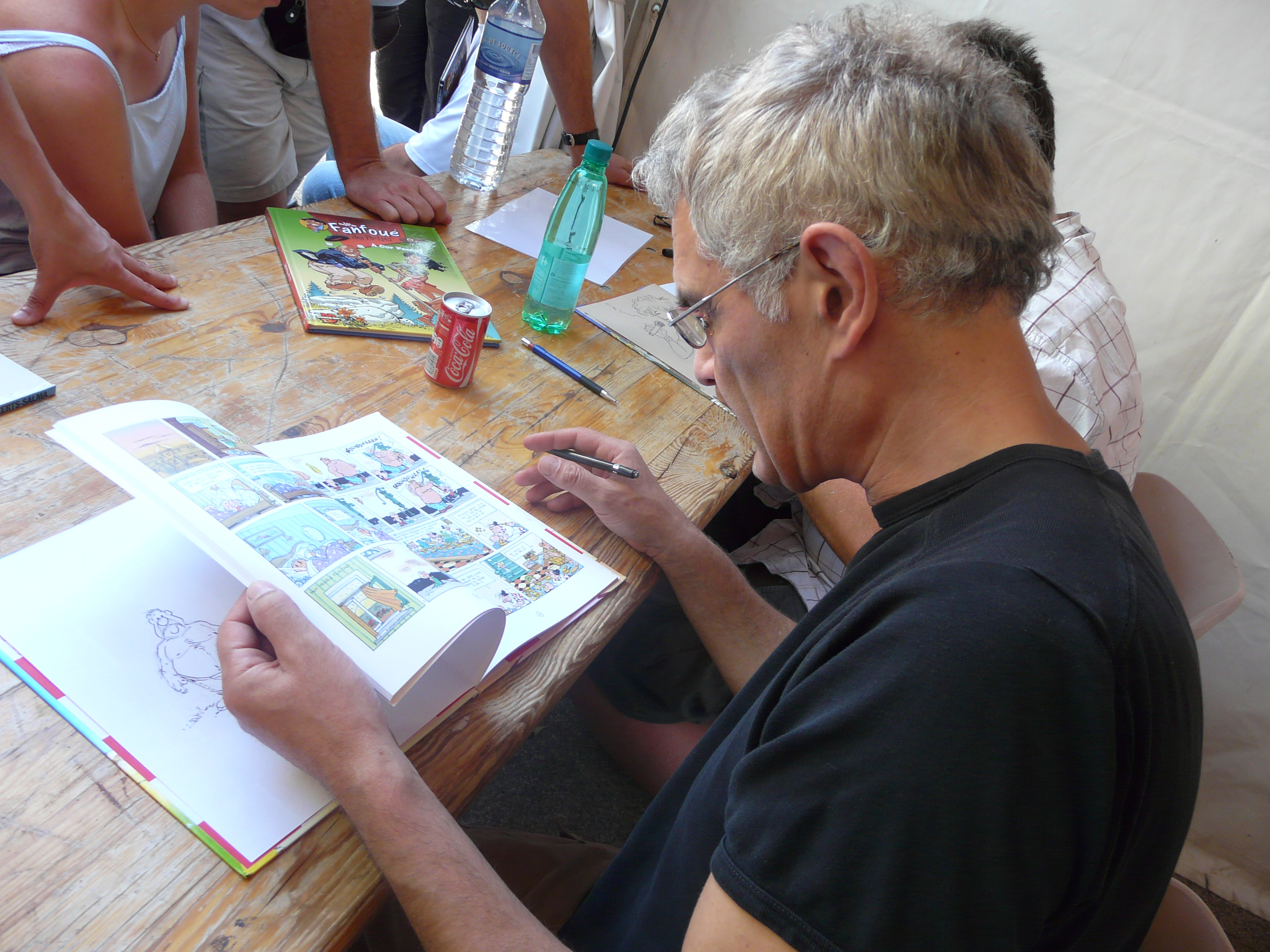
- André Geerts at a comics festival in 2008.
- Born: 18 December 1955 Brussels, Belgium
- Died: 27 July 2010 (aged 54)
- Areas: Writer, Artist
- Notable works: Jojo
- Awards: full list

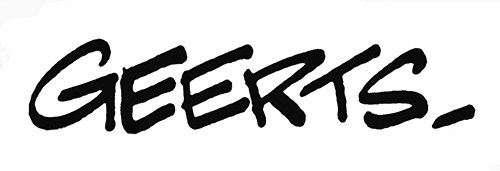
André Geerts's signature

André Geerts (18 December 1955 – 27 July 2010) was a Belgian comics creator best known for his series Jojo.

== Biography ==
André Geerts was born in Brussels in 1955. He studied at the Institut Saint-Luc art school in Brussels. He started working for Le Soir Jeunesse (the youth supplement of newspaper Le Soir) in 1974, when he was only 18 years old, before joining the Franco-Belgian comics magazine Spirou. His success series Jojo, about the small scale, real life but humoristic adventures of a boy of seven years old, started in 1983, with on average one new album a year. Jojo was adapted to the animated television special Jojo: The Violet Mystery in 2000, and a series was under development. He also created later on Mademoiselle Louise, about a girl of about the same age as Jojo, but who is extremely rich and lonely.

Geerts died in 2010 from cancer.

== Bibliography ==
- Jojo, 17 volumes, 1983–2010, Dupuis (volume 18 appears in October 2010)
- Monde cruel, 2 volumes, 1985–1997, Dupuis
- Jabert contre l'adversité, 1 volume, 1990, written by Pierre Le Gall, Delcourt
- Le Commissaire Martin, 1995, 1 volume, Editions Point Image – JVDH
- Mademoiselle Louise, 4 volumes, written by Sergio Salma, Casterman, later Dupuis

== Awards ==
- 1980: Prix Saint-Michel for best comical artist
- 1994: Oecumenic Jury Award at the Angoulême International Comics Festival for the first volume of Mademoiselle Louise
- 1997: Grand Prix of the city of Durbuy for Monde Cruel
- 1998: Crayon d'or (Golden Pencil) of the city of Brussels, awarded by the Belgian Chamber of Comic Experts
- 2003: Grand prix of the city of Brussels, awarded at the festival of Ganshoren
- 2003: Prix Saint-Michel for best French language youth comic for Jojo
- 2007: Prize of the Young Readers at the Festival of Vaison-la-Romaine for Jojo 16: Jojo vétérinaire
- 2007: nominated for the Prix Saint-Michel for best youth comic for Jojo 16: Jojo vétérinaire
- 2008: nominated for the Prix Saint-Michel for best youth comic for Jojo 17: Confisqué
