= The Darwinners =

- Created by: Jul
- Country of origin: France
- Original language: French
- No. of series: 5
- No. of episodes: 180

Production
- Running time: 3 minutes

Original release
- Release: 15 September 2012

The Darwinners is an animated television series based on the Silex and the City comic created by French cartoonist Jul. The show attracted an audience of 1.3 million viewers. A film adaptation was announced for 2023 but was delayed to 2024.

== Synopsis ==
The show is set in a comical version of the Stone Age, featuring the Dotcoms, a stone age family.

== Cast ==
- Clément Sibony
- Arnaud Montebourg
