= Jack Palmer (comics) =

Jack Palmer is a comic character created in 1974 by René Pétillon. He is a goofy private detective. His satirical adventures touch various social subjects: politics, the media, the mafia, the jet set, etc.

The series ran from 1974 until 2013.

== Albums ==
1. Pétillon, Éditions du Fromage, 1976. Renamed in Gourous, derviches et co. in 1979, in Une sacrée salade in 1981
2. Mister Palmer et Docteur Supermarketstein, Éditions du fromage, 1977
3. La Dent creuse, Éditions du fromage, 1978
4. Les Disparus d'Apostrophes !, Dargaud, 1982
5. Le chanteur de Mexico, Dargaud, 1984
6. Le Prince de la BD, Dargaud, 1985
7. Le Pékinois, Dargaud, 1987
8. Un détective dans le Yucca, Albin Michel, 1989
9. Narco-dollars, Albin Michel, 1990
10. Un privé dans la nuit, Albin Michel, 1993
11. Le Top-model, Albin Michel, 1995. Renamed L'Affaire du top-model in 2001
12. L'Enquête corse, Albin Michel, 2000
13. L'Affaire du voile, Albin Michel, 2006
14. Enquête au paradis, Dargaud, 2009
15. Palmer en Bretagne, Dargaud, 2013

Special issue:

- Le Meilleur et le pire de Jack Palmer, Albin Michel, 1999

== Adaptations ==
- List of films based on French-language comics
  - The Corsican File (L'Enquête corse)
- List of TV series based on French-language comics
