= Charles Pépin =

French philosopher and novelist

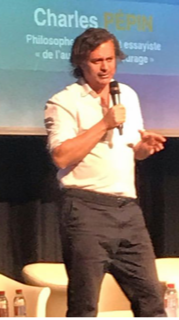
- Charles Pépin in 2019
- Born: 1973 (age 51–52); Saint-Cloud, France
- Occupations: Philosopher; novelist

Charles Pépin is a French philosopher and novelist. He was born in Saint Cloud in 1973. He is the author of several bestsellers, such as Les Vertus de l’échec (Allary Éditions, 2016), La Confiance en soi (Allary Éditions, 2018) and La Planète des sages (Dargaud, 2011 et 2015).

He graduated from HEC Paris and Sciences Po.

== Books ==
=== Essays ===
- Une semaine de philosophie, Flammarion, 2006 ISBN 9782081233904 / J'ai Lu, 2008 ISBN 9782290002995
- Les Philosophes sur le divan - Quand Freud rencontre Platon, Kant et Sartre, Flammarion, 2008 ISBN 2081205564 / J'ai Lu, 2010 ISBN 9782290018521
- Qu'est-ce qu'avoir du pouvoir ?, Desclée de Brouwer, 2010 ISBN 9782220061931
- Ceci n'est pas un manuel de philosophie, Flammarion, 2010 ISBN 9782081228566
- Un homme libre peut-il croire en Dieu, Éditions de l'opportun, 2012 ISBN 9782360750825
- Quand la Beauté nous sauve, Robert Laffont, 2013, Marabout 2014 ISBN 9782221114087
- Les Vertus de l'échec, Allary Éditions, 2016 ISBN 9782370730121
- La Confiance en soi, Allary Éditions, 2018 ISBN 9782370731661
- La Rencontre, Allary Éditions, 2021 ISBN 9782370733481

=== Novels ===
- Descente, Flammarion, 1999 ISBN 9782080676764
- Les Infidèles, Flammarion, 2003 ISBN 9782080680044
- La Joie, Allary Éditions, 2015, Folio, 2016 ISBN 9782370730060

=== Cartoons ===
- La planète des sages, Tome 1 - Encyclopédie mondiale des philosophes et des philosophies, en collaboration avec Jul, Dargaud, 2011, ISBN 978-2205-06852-8
- Platon La Gaffe - Survivre au travail avec les philosophes, avec Jul, Dargaud, 2013 ISBN 9782205072549
- La planète des sages, Tome 2 - Encyclopédie mondiale des philosophes et des philosophies, en collaboration avec Jul, Dargaud, 2015, ISBN 978-2205-07126-9
- 50 nuances de Grecs, Tome 1 - Encyclopédie des mythes et des mythologies, avec Jul, Dargaud, 2017 ISBN 978-2205076073
- 50 nuances de Grecs, Tome 2 - Encyclopédie des mythes et des mythologies, avec Jul, Dargaud, 2019
