= Philippe Nassif =

French journalist (1971–2022)

- Born: 1971; Beirut, Lebanon
- Died: 18 March 2022 (aged 50); Paris, France
- Occupations: Writer; Philosopher

Philippe Nassif (1971 – 18 March 2022) was a French journalist and writer. In 2011, he was editorial advisor to Philosophie Magazine, and worked for the Madame Figaro, or ADN" and responsible for the "Essays" section of Technikart.

== Biography ==
=== Studies and journalistic career ===
Student at the Institute of Political Studies in Paris, with Charles Pépin, he joined the magazine Technikart, responsible for the "Essays" section and reviewed contemporary authors Slavoj Žižek, Peter Sloterdijk, Bernard Stiegler before becoming editorial advisor to Philosophie Magazine. On 18 March 2022, Nassif died by suicide, at the age of 50.

=== Works ===
In 2002, he published Welcome to a useless world, the adventures of Jean No with Denoël editions; with Mehdi Belhaj Kacem, he published Pop philosophie, a work popularizing the thought of Alain Badiou and in 2011, The Initial Struggle: Leaving the Empire of Nihilism.

== Bibliography ==
- Bienvenue dans un monde inutile. Les aventures de Jean-No, la fashion victim la plus sympathique de France, Éditions Denoël, 2002 ISBN 2207252965
- Pop philosophie. Entretiens avec Mehdi Belhaj Kacem, Éditions Denoël, 2005 ISBN 2207255115
- La lutte initiale : Quitter l'empire du nihilisme, Éditions Denoël, 2011 ISBN 9782207111031
