= Kyan Khojandi =

French comedian and actor

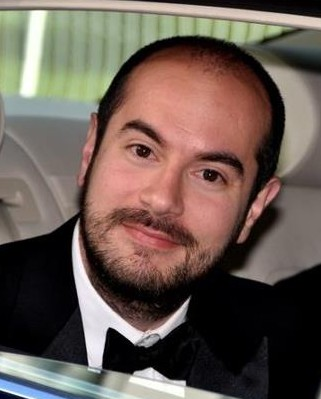
- Khojandi at the Festival de Cannes
- Born: 29 August 1982 (age 44); Reims, France
- Occupations: Actor; Comedian
- Years active: 2008–present

Kyan Khojandi (born 29 August 1982) is a French comedian, actor and screenwriter born to a French mother and an Iranian father. He is best known for playing the main character in the television series Bref, which was broadcast on Canal+ from 2011 to 2012 and then revived in 2025.

== Life and career ==
Kyan Khojandi was born in Reims. His father was Persian and worked as a geologist before fleeing the Iranian Revolution, and later worked in the carpet trade when he arrived in France. His mother is a lawyer, originally from Picardy. He has one brother, Keyvan Khojandi, who plays the role of Kyan's brother in the Bref series.

At 6 years old, Kyan entered the Music conservatory of Reims where he learned to play viola. He then entered the Cours Simon in Paris in 2004 where he studied theatre to become a professional comedian. He wrote his first texts in 2006, then started open stages and played in artists' opening shows.

From March 2008 to February 2010, he appeared in the show La Bande-annonce de ma vie. Yassine Belattar gave him an opportunity to act in his shows Le Belattar Show and On achève bien l'info on France 4, which made him popular. He finalised his solo programme by playing small roles on the Parisian scene.

From 29 August 2011 to 12 July 2012, he played the main character in television series Bref, which was broadcast three times per week at 8.30 pm as part of the French Canal+ show Le grand journal.

He also appeared in a few ads for French car parts and service station chain Norauto.

== Television ==
- 2008-2012 : T'as rien de mieux à faire?! (Web series)
- 2012 : Very Bad Blagues (TV Show)
- 2012-2013 : Palmashow (TV Show)
- 2013 : Le Golden Show (Web series)
- 2014 : Bref, les 30 ans de Canal+ (TV Short)
- 2014 : Le Golden Moustache (Web series)
- 2017 : Serge le Mytho (TV Show)
- 2017 : What the Fuck France (TV Show)
- 2017 : Les duos impossibles de Jérémy Ferrari (TV Show)
- 2020 : Le Golden Moustache (Web series)
- 2021 : Replay (TV Show)
- 2021 : LOL: Qui rit sort (TV Show)
- 2022 : Flippé (TV Show)
- 2022 : Encore vous? (TV Show)
- 2023 : LOL : Qui crie, sort ! (TV Show)

== Theatre ==
- 2011 : Anatole written by Kyan Khojandi and Bruno Muschio, directed by François Delaive
- 2011 : Jamais au bon endroit au bon moment written by Greg Romano, directed by Kyan Khojandi
- 2016-2017 : Pulsions written by Kyan Khojandi and Bruno Muschio (one-man-show)
- 2019-2021 : Une bonne soirée written by Kyan Khojandi and Bruno Muschio (one-man-show)
- 2022 : 1h22 avant la fin written by Matthieu Delaporte, directed by Matthieu Delaporte & Alexandre de La Patellière
- 2023 : Une bonne soirée written by Kyan Khojandi and Bruno Muschio (one-man-show)

== Filmography ==
Year	Title	Role	Director	Notes
2011	Salle comble	Benoît Constant	Sylvain Coisne	Short
2011–12	Bref	I	Kyan Khojandi & Bruno Muschio	TV series (82 episodes); Nominated - Globe de Cristal Award for Best Television Film or Television Series
2013	Chinese Puzzle	Antoine Garceau	Cédric Klapisch	
2014	Lou! Journal infime	Richard	Julien Neel	
2014	Monsieur tout le monde	The man	Julien Hosmalin	Music video for Bigflo & Oli
2015	Our Futures	Max	Rémi Bezançon	
2015	Les dissociés	The postman	Raphaël Descraques	
2015	All Three of Us	Beard	Kheiron	
2016	Rosalie Blum	Vincent Machot	Julien Rappeneau	
2016	La folle histoire de Max et Léon	Commandant Poulain	Jonathan Barré	
2016	Les potos	Himself	Vincent Desailly & Jade Lombard	Music video for Oxmo Puccino
2017	Santa & Cie	Amélie's brother	Alain Chabat	
2017	See You Up There	Dupré	Albert Dupontel	
2017	Calls	Théo	Timothée Hochet	TV series (1 episode)
2018	Dr Life	Réginald	Akim Omiri	Short
2018	May we meet again	Him	Kyan Khojandi	Short
2018	Groom	The previous groom	Théodore Bonnet	TV series (3 episodes)
2019	Sweetheart	Paul	Lisa Azuelos	
2020	Bye Bye Morons	Dr Lint's doctor	Albert Dupontel	
2020	Blue	The veterinarian	Valentin Vincent	Short
2021	The Speech	Ludo	Laurent Tirard	
2021	Les méchants	Gilbert	Mouloud Achour & Dominique Baumard	
2021	Cher Journal	The main suspect	Anna Apter	TV series (1 episode)
2022	Le visiteur du futur	Boris	François Descraques	
