= Lou! Journal infime =

- Film poster
- Directed by: Julien Neel
- Written by: Julien Neel; Marc Syrigas
- Based on: Lou! by Julien Neel
- Produced by: Bruno Levy; Harold Valentin; Aurélien Larger
- Starring: Lola Lasseron; Ludivine Sagnier; Kyan Khojandi; Nathalie Baye
- Cinematography: Pierre Milon
- Edited by: Yannick Kergoat
- Music by: Julien Di Caro
- Production companies: Move Movie; Mother Production; StudioCanal; France 2 Cinéma; Scope Pictures; Cinéfrance 1888; Canal+; Cine+; France Télévisions; Belgacom
- Distributed by: StudioCanal
- Release dates: 24 August 2014 (Angoulême); 8 October 2014 (France)
- Running time: 104 minutes
- Country: France
- Language: French
- Budget: $8.8 million
- Box office: $1.6 million

Lou! Journal infime is a 2014 French comedy film directed by Julien Neel, based on the first volume of his comic book series, Lou!. The screenplay was written by Julien Neel and Marc Syrigas. It stars Lola Lasseron, Ludivine Sagnier, Kyan Khojandi, and Nathalie Baye. Lou! Journal infime premiered at the Festival du film francophone d'Angoulême on 24 August 2014, and was released in France on 8 October 2014.

== Cast ==
- Lola Lasseron as Lou
- Ludivine Sagnier as Emma
- Kyan Khojandi as Richard
- Nathalie Baye as Lou's grandmother
- Joshua Mazé as Tristan
- Eden Hoch as Mina
- Lily Taïb as Marie-Emelie
- Léa Nataf as Karine
- Virgile Hurard as Jean-Jean
- Téo Yacoub as Preston
- Sacha Vassort as Manolo
- Anne Agbadou-Masson as Jocelyne
- Winston Ong as Gino
- Julie Ferrier as Sophie
- François Rollin as Henry
- Pierre Rousselet as Robert

== Production ==
=== Development ===
In September 2013, Variety reported that StudioCanal was set to co-produce, distribute, and sell the film.

=== Filming ===
Filming began on 28 October 2013 at the Bry-sur-Marne studio and in Paris, with additional scenes filmed at Lycee Jules Verne in Cergy. Filming ended on 17 January 2014.

== Music ==
Julien Di Caro, the composer for the animated television series, returned to score the film.

== Home media ==
Lou! Journal infime was released on DVD and Blu-ray on 10 February 2015.

== Reception ==
Film review aggregator Rotten Tomatoes reported a 17% approval rating, with an average rating of 4.4/10, based on 6 reviews.
