= Les Blondes =

Belgian comic book series

- Cover to the first issue
- Author(s): Gérard Guéro; Dzack; Yoann Guillo
- Launch date: 2005
- Publisher: Soleil Productions
- Genre: Gag-a-day

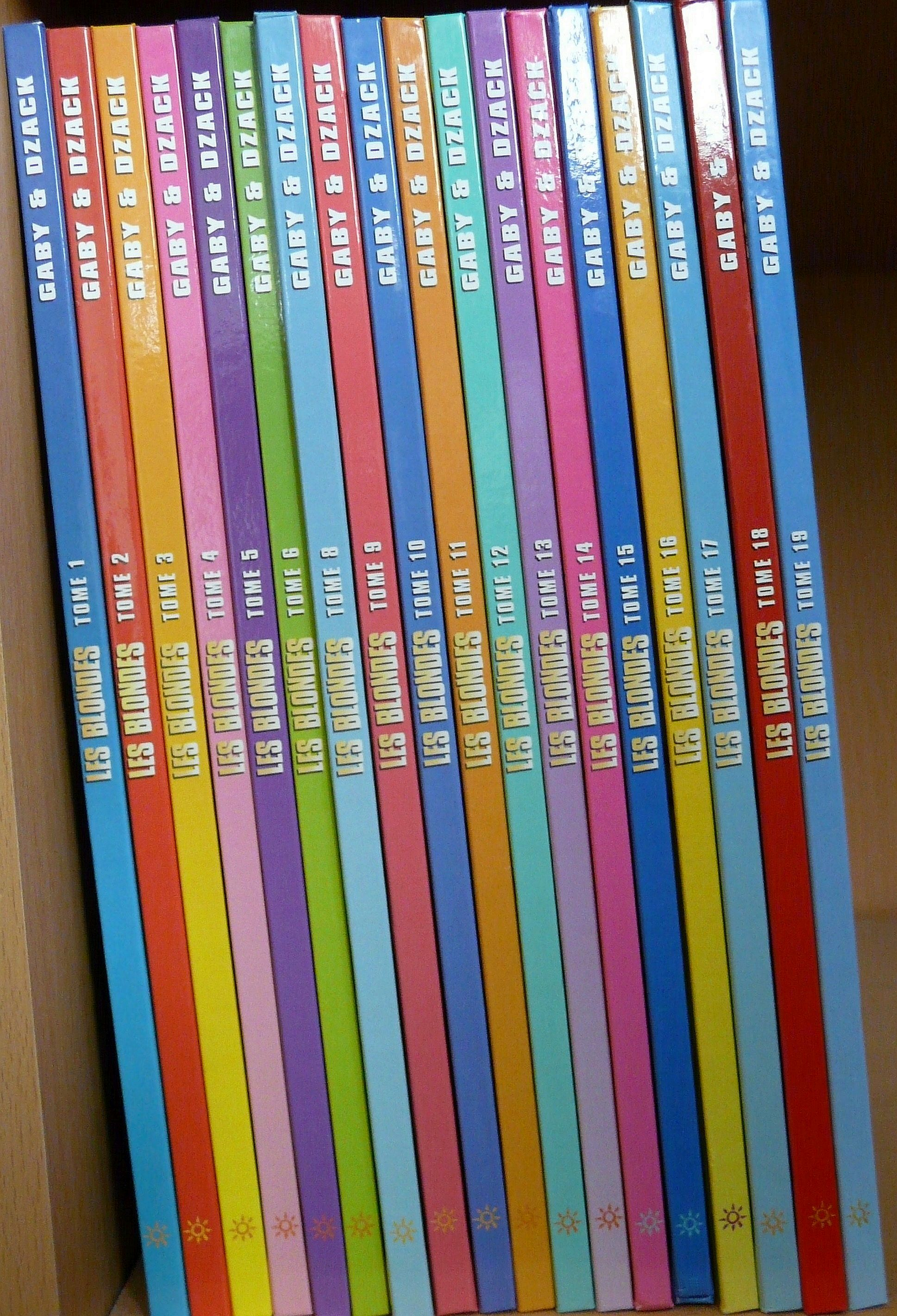
The first 19 albums of the series (except one)

Les Blondes is a humorous cartoon strip, encapsulating many blonde stereotypes, often those relating to blondes' supposed stupidity.

== Creators ==
- Script: Gérard Guéro
- Drawings: Christian Paty ("Dzack")
- Colourist: Yoann Guillo

== Characters ==
- Vanessa : The strip's heroine. Rather dim, but good-natured, she is the stereotypical blonde.
- Ophélie : Vanessa's friend, also blonde and equally dim.
- Amandine : Vanessa's friend, blonde but not as stupid as Vanessa. She plays a lot of sport.
- Kim : Vanessa's friend. Elle a les cheveux noirs et est Asiatique, souvent représentée dans son bureau.
- Chloé : Vanessa's friend. Redhead.
- Anne : Vanessa's friend. Brunette, wears glasses.
- JPFK : Producer of TV game shows in which Vanessa and other blondes take part.
- Le directeur (@the director): Vanessa's boss. Always grumbling, he regularly sends Vanessa to Human Resources when she is being stupid.
- Jules : Vanessa's boyfriend.

== Collections ==
1. Volume 1 (2005)
2. Volume 2 (2005)
3. Volume 3 (2005)
4. Plus blondes que jamais (2006)
5. Qui dit mieux ? (2007)
6. Mises à nu (2007)
7. James Blondes 007 (2007)
8. Le Grand Huit (2008)
9. Il est pas joli, mon neuf? (2009)
10. Ça se fête (2009)
11. Plus blondes que blondes (2009)
12. Coucou Qui C'est ? (2010)
13. Ca porte bonheur ! (2011)
14. Dans mes bras! (2011)
15. C'est cadeau (2011)
16. Blonde Attitude (2012)
17. Vous voulez ma photo? (2012)
18. Vu à la télé (2013)
19. Ça plane pour moi! (2013)
20. Volume 20 (2014)
21. Olé (2014)
22. On est toutes blondes! (2015)
23. C'est tous les jours Noël (2015)

== Spin-offs ==
1. Les Blondes en Ch'tis (2008)
2. Les Blondes en Breton (2009)
3. Les Mini-Blondes (2010)
4. Morceaux choisis (2010)
5. 3D, plus mieux qu'Avatar ! (2010)
6. Best-Of 3D! (2011)
7. Les Recettes (2011)
8. Les Blondes 3D - Volume 3 (2012)
9. Blondes Academy (2012)
10. La compil' des vacances! (2013)
11. Les Animals (2014)
12. Les blondes en trois dés! (2015)

=== Publishers ===
- Soleil Productions : volumes 1 – 11 (first editions)

== Adaptations ==
- Les Blondes was an animated TV series adapted from Albums 1 to 9. Directed by Yann Bonnin, produced in 2007 by Cyber Group Animation. The series consists of 100 ninety-second shorts, using Flash animation. The main heroine, Vanessa, is voiced by actress Patricia Elig.

== See also ==
- Blonde stereotype
