= Silex and the City =

French comic series

Publication information
- Publisher: Dargaud
- Publication date: 2009
- No. of issues: 9

Creative team
- Written by: Jul
- Colorist: Patrice Larcenet

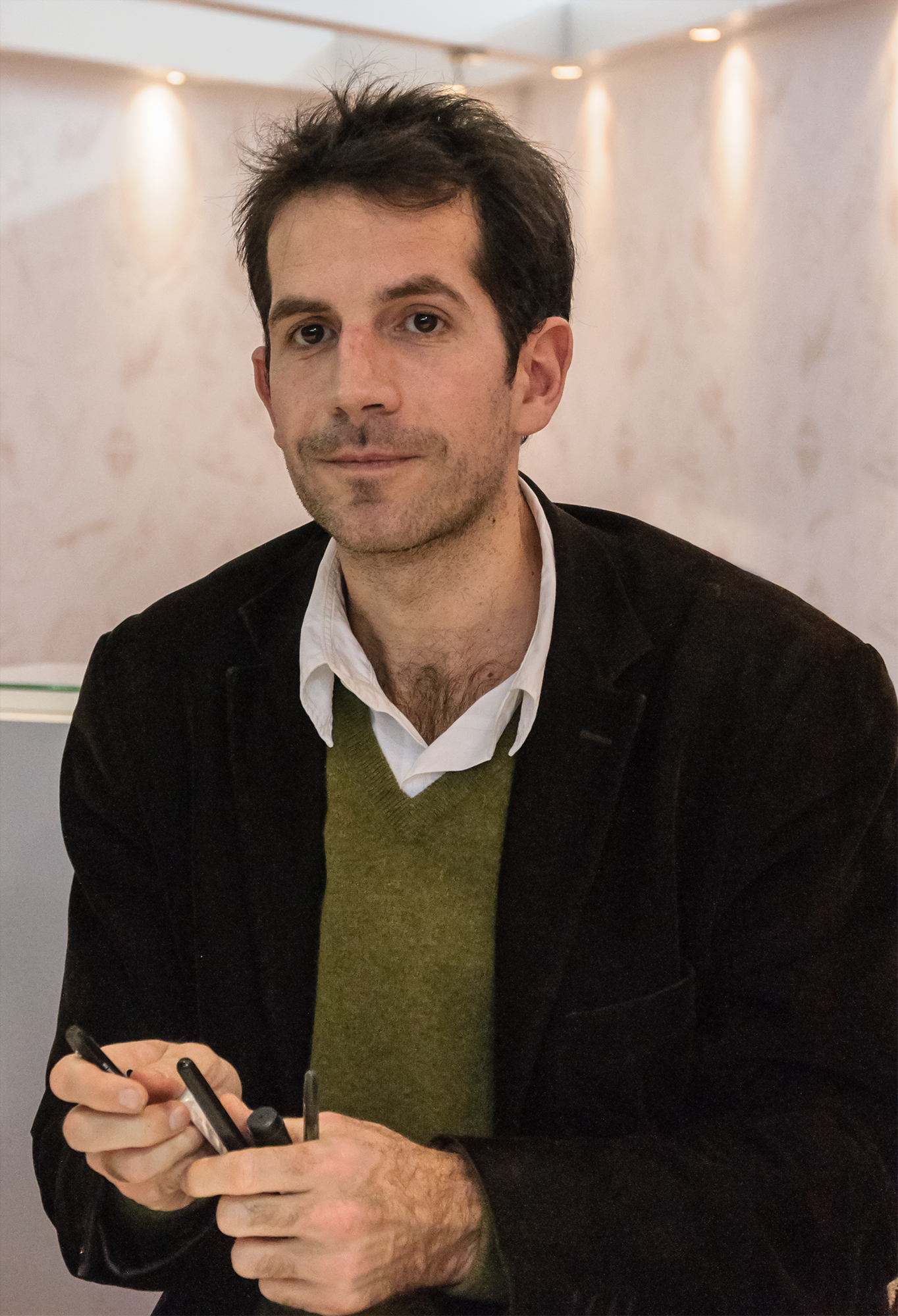
Jul, 2013

Silex and the City is a comic book series created by Jul. The comic was adapted into an animated television show called The Darwinners. A film adaptation was released in 2024.

== Synopsis ==
The show is set in a comical version of the Stone Age, featuring the Dotcoms, a Stone Age family.
