= Yakari (1983 TV series) =

1980s animated television series

- Series poster
- Genre: Action-adventure
- Based on: Yakari by: Job; Derib
- Country of origin: France
- No. of seasons: 1
- No. of episodes: 52

Production
- Running time: 5 minutes

Original release
- Network: Antenne 2
- Release: September 13, 1983 – January 31, 1984

Yakari is a 1983 French animated television series based on the Franco-Belgian comics of the same name created by Job and Derib.

The show debuted on 13 September 1983 on Antenne 2 on Récré A2 and on Swiss television on Babibouchettes.

== Synopsis ==
This series features the adventures of Yakari, a little Sioux boy, and his faithful steed, Little Thunder, in the great prairie. Yakari has the ability to communicate with all animals, a gift that was transmitted to him by his totem, the Great Eagle.

== Episodes ==
No.	Title	Original release date
1	(French: Le Mur de roche)	September 13, 1983
2	(French: Bison Blanc)	October 8, 1983
3	(French: La Pêche)	October 15, 1983
4	(French: La Sécheresse)	October 22, 1983
5	(French: L'Oisillon)	October 29, 1983
6	(French: La Grotte)	November 5, 1983
7	(French: La Source)	November 7, 1983
8	(French: Le Serpent)	November 19, 1983
9	(French: Le Petit Bison)	November 26, 1983
10	(French: Les Œufs)	December 3, 1983
11	(French: Poursuit)	December 10, 1983
12	(French: L'Ombre)	December 17, 1983
13	(French: Le Grizzli)	December 24, 1983
14	(French: L'Île)	December 31, 1983
15	(French: Le Renard)	January 7, 1984
16	(French: La Poursuit)	January 14, 1984
17	(French: Les Renarde aux)	January 21, 1984
18	(French: Les Prisonniers de l'île)	January 28, 1984
19	(French: Le Message)	February 4, 1984
20	(French: Le Glouton)	February 11, 1984
21	(French: L'Inondation)	February 18, 1984
22	(French: Nanabozo)	February 25, 1984
23	(French: Graine-de-Bison)	March 4, 1984
24	(French: Les Mocassins magiques)	March 11, 1984
25	(French: La Flèche infaillible)	March 18, 1984
26	"Le Pays des ours blancs"	March 25, 1984
27	(French: Le Rhume)	April 1, 1984
28	(French: Le Remède)	April 8, 1984
29	(French: Le Calumet)	April 15, 1984
30	(French: Le Collier)	April 22, 1984
31	(French: Les Cornes du désert)	April 29, 1984
32	(French: Les Loutres)	May 6, 1984
33	(French: La Guérison)	May 13, 1984
34	(French: Le Pélican)	May 20, 1984
35	(French: Le Corral)	May 27, 1984
36	(French: Sous la prairie)	June 3, 1984
37	(French: Petit Tonnerre)	June 10, 1984
38	(French: Les Épreuves)	June 17, 1984
39	(French: Le Cheval sauvage)	June 24, 1984
40	(French: Le Loup)	July 1, 1984
41	(French: La Sculptur)	July 8, 1984
42	(French: Tilleul)	July 15, 1984
43	(French: La Rivière)	July 22, 1984
44	(French: La Disparition de Tilleul)	July 29, 1984
45	(French: L'Alerte)	August 5, 1984
46	(French: L'Orage)	August 12, 1984
47	(French: Le Retour du pélican)	August 26, 1984
48	(French: Au pays des loups)	September 2, 1984
49	(French: La Plume)	September 9, 1984
50	(French: Le Totem)	September 16, 1984
51	(French: Grand-Aigle)	September 23, 1984
52	(French: Le Départ)	September 30, 1984
