= Rosalie Blum =

2015 film

- Theatrical release poster
- Directed by: Julien Rappeneau
- Screenplay by: Julien Rappeneau
- Based on: Rosalie Blum by Camille Jourdy
- Produced by: Michaël Gentile; Charles Gillibert
- Starring: Noémie Lvovsky; Kyan Khojandi; Alice Isaaz
- Cinematography: Pierre Cottereau
- Edited by: Stan Collet
- Music by: Martin Rappeneau
- Production companies: The Film; CG Cinéma
- Distributed by: SND Films
- Release dates: 11 November 2015 (Sarlat); 23 March 2016 (France)
- Running time: 95 minutes
- Country: France
- Language: French
- Budget: $5.5 million
- Box office: $4.2 million

Rosalie Blum is a 2015 French comedy-drama film written and directed by Julien Rappeneau in his directorial debut. The film is based on a graphic novel series of the same name by Camille Jourdy. It stars Noémie Lvovsky, Kyan Khojandi and Alice Isaaz.

== Plot ==
Vincent Machot lives an ordinary life, divided between his hair salon, his cousin, his cat, and his intrusive mother. With a very reserved character, his romantic life is limited to missed dates with his friend, who had been living in Paris for several months but was not keen to meet him again. By chance, he meets Rosalie Blum, the manager of a small business and a solitary and mysterious woman, whom Vincent is convinced he had met before. But where? Intrigued, he decides to follow her everywhere in the hope of learning more. Rosalie eventually notices that Vincent is following her, and asks her niece, Aude, an idle and lazy student, to help her watch Vincent. Aude invites her three whimsical friends to assist in her mission to discover more about Vincent. The team gathers clues, suspecting Vincent of evil and criminal intent. After this careful investigation, the characters' true natures are revealed, with their personal lives unraveled and the barriers between them removed.

== Cast ==
- Noémie Lvovsky as Rosalie Blum
- Kyan Khojandi as Vincent Machot
- Alice Isaaz as Aude Cerceau
- Anémone as Simone Machot
- Philippe Rebbot as The room-mate
- Sara Giraudeau as Cécile
- Camille Rutherford as Laura
- Nicolas Bridet as Laurent
- Aude Pépin as Aude's sister
- Grégoire Oestermann as Aude's father

== Filming locations ==
Most of the scenes were filmed in Nevers in Bourgogne-Franche-Comté between March and April 2015. The end scenes were filmed in Leffrinckoucke in the Nord the month after.

== Accolades ==
Award / Film Festival	Category	Recipients and nominees	Result
César Awards	Best First Feature Film	Rosalie Blum	Nominated
Festival du film de Sarlat 2015	Prize of lycéens (secondary school students)	Rosalie Blum	Awarded
Festival du film de Sarlat 2015	Prize for female acting	Noémie Lvovsky	Awarded
Gijón International Film Festival 2016	Public prize	Rosalie Blum	Awarded
