= Jojo: The Violet Mystery =

2000 Belgian animated film

- Jojo: Le Mystère Violaine
- Based on: Jojo by André Geerts
- Directed by: Michel Gauthier; Guy Quelquejeu
- Countries of origin: Belgium; France
- Original language: French

Production
- Running time: 52 minutes
- Production companies: Dupuis Audiovisuel; TF1

Original release
- Network: La Deux
- Release: 21 December 2000
- Network: TF1
- Release: 25 December 2000

Jojo: The Violet Mystery (French: Jojo: Le Mystère Violaine) is a 2000 animated Christmas television special. It is based on three albums of the Jojo comics by André Geerts: La fugue de Jojo, Le mystère Violaine, and Le serment d'amitié. In Belgium, it premiered on 21 December 2000 on La Deux's Ici Bla-Bla programme. It also aired on Christmas Day, 2000 on TF1 in France and Switzerland on TSR. As of 2002, Dupuis was also producing a 78 episode Jojo series with TF1 Jeunesse.

== Plot ==
There is a new classmate, Violet, at the school attended by eight-year-olds Jojo and Fat Louis. She is ridiculed for her big nose, and later runs away on Christmas Eve.

== See also ==
- List of Christmas films
