= Allary Éditions =

French publishing house

- Founded: 2013; 13 years ago
- Founder: Guillaume Allary
- Country of origin: France
- Publication types: Books
- Revenue: 4 183 200 € in 2017
- No. of employees: 5 (2017)
- Official website: www.%09allary-editions.fr

Allary Éditions is an independent French publishing house.

== History ==
Founded in 2013 by Guillaume Allary, a former philosophy teacher from Nancy, who worked for the Maison d'éducation de la Légion d'honneur, then Flammarion, Hachette Littératures and NiL Éditions, and publishes about fifteen of works per year. A generalist house, Allary Éditions publishes novels, essays and comics. It limits its production to about fifteen titles per year. It publishes, in each field, reference authors, able to address the greatest number of people while building a work.

== Catalog ==
- Riad Sattouf
  - L'Arabe du futur 1, Une jeunesse au Moyen-Orient (1978-1984), 2014
  - L'Arabe du futur 2, Une jeunesse au Moyen-Orient (1984-1985), 2015
  - Les Cahiers d'Esther, Histoires de mes 10 ans, 2016
  - L'Arabe du futur 3, Une jeunesse au Moyen-Orient (1985-1987), 2016
  - Les Cahiers d'Esther, Histoires de mes 11 ans, 2017
  - Les Cahiers d'Esther, Histoires de mes 12 ans, 2017
  - L'Arabe du futur 4, Une jeunesse au Moyen-Orient (1987-1992), 2018
  - Les Cahiers d'Esther, Histoires de mes 13 ans, 2019
  - Les Cahiers d'Esther, Histoires de mes 14 ans, 2020
  - L'Arabe du futur 5, Une jeunesse au Moyen-Orient (1992-1994), 2020
  - Les Cahiers d'Esther, Histoires de mes 15 ans, 2021
- Matthieu Ricard
  - Plaidoyer pour les animaux, 2015
  - with Christophe André and Alexandre Jollien, Trois amis en quête de sagesse, 2016
  - with Wolf Singer, Cerveau et méditation : dialogue entre le bouddhisme et les neurosciences, prefaced by Christophe André, 2017
  - with Tania Singer, Pouvoir et altruisme, 2018
  - with Christophe André and Alexandre Jollien, À nous la liberté !, 2019
  - with Christophe André and Alexandre Jollien, Abécédaire de la sagesse, 2020
  - with Ilios Kotsou, Les folles histoires du sage Nasredin, 2021
  - with Jason Gruhl, Nos amis les animaux, 2021. Album jeunesse.
  - Carnets d'un moine errant, 2021
- Raphaël Glucksmann
  - Génération gueule de bois, 2015
  - Notre France, dire et aimer ce que nous sommes, 2016
  - Les enfants du vide, 2018
  - Lettre à la génération qui va tout changer, 2021
- Charles Pépin
  - La Joie, 2015
  - Les Vertus de l'échec, 2016
  - La Confiance en soi, 2018
  - La Rencontre, 2021
- Bernard Pivot,
  - Au secours ! Les mots m'ont mangé, 2017
  - Amis, chers Amis, 2022
- Philippe Douroux, Alexandre Grothendieck, Sur les traces du dernier génie des mathématiques, 2016
- Joude Jassouma, Laurence de Cambronne, Je viens d'Alep, Itinéraire d'un réfugié ordinaire, Paris/61-Lonrai, Allary éditions/Normandie roto impr., 2017
- Michel Hazanavicius, La Classe Américaine, 2020
- Lauren Bastide, Présentes, 2020
- Marylène Patou-Mathis, L'homme préhistorique est aussi une femme, 2021
- Caroline Michel-Aguirre, Matthieu Aron, Les Infiltrés, 2022
- Alexandre Lacroix, L'art de faire l'amour, 2022
