= Yassine Belattar =

French television presenter

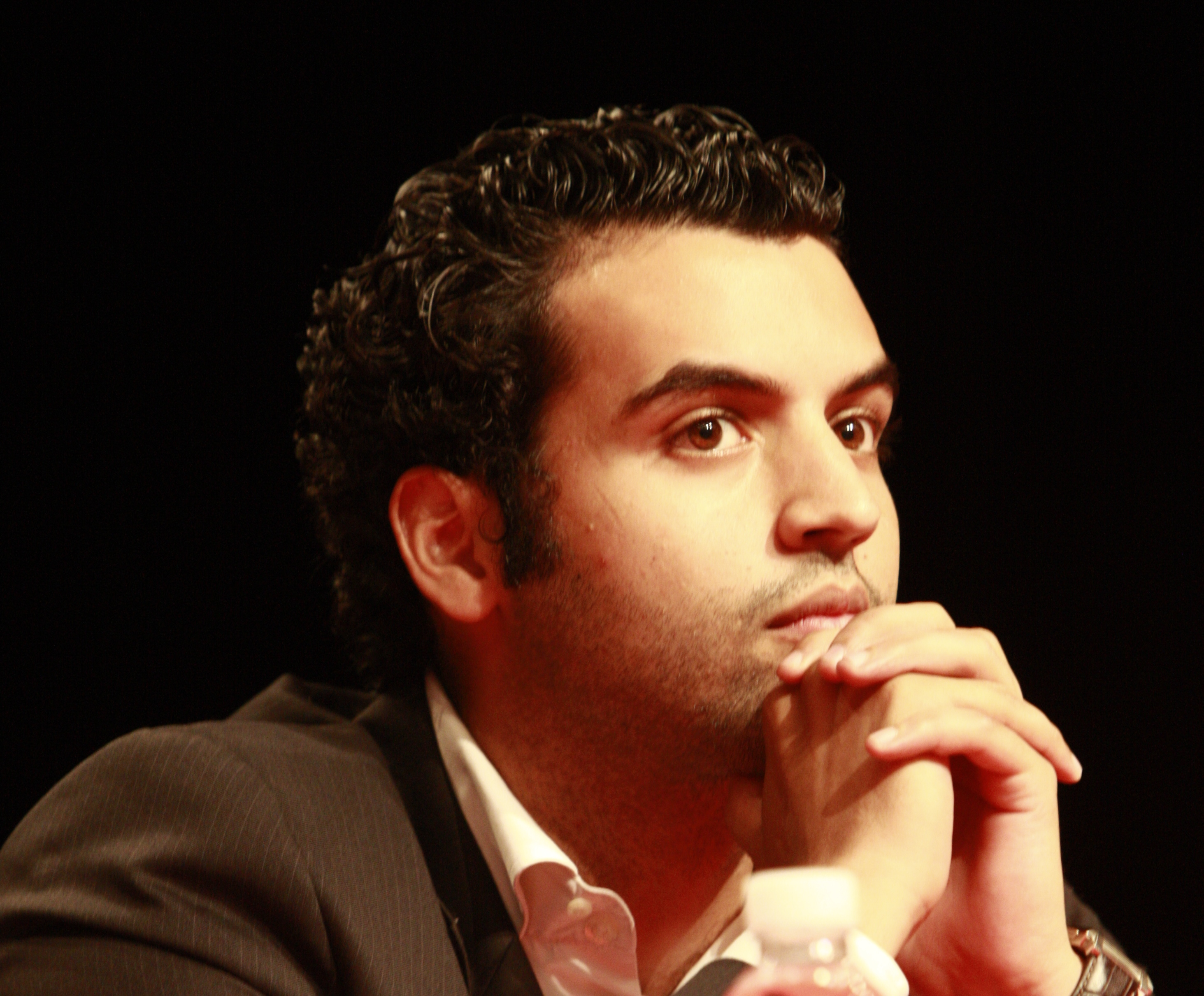
- Born: June 27, 1982; Conflans-Sainte-Honorine, France
- Occupation: Comedian

Yassine Belattar (born on June 27, 1982) is a French comedian, columnist and radio host.

== Biography ==
Born in France to Moroccan parents, Yassine Belattar grew up in L'Étang-la-Ville (Yvelines) where he has participated, since the age of ten, in a pirate radio of Yvelines, Strange FM. Later, this radio obtains an official frequency and broadcasts under the name of Yvelines Radio. His team then animates radio animation options and reports. When he was 18, his family moved to Mureaux.

Since 2003 he has hosted morning chronicles on the radio station Générations 88.2. He met Thomas Barbazan, with whom he would form a complementary duo mixing humor and music. He left Générations in 2007. He writes a column on television in Pascale Clark's show En aparté (2006–2007 season) and participates in programs on Virgin 17. At the end of the month of July 2008, he stopped La Matinale, the radio show he cohosted with Thomas and Chloé. In 2008, he participated in Ça balance à Paris presented by Pierre Lescure on Paris Première.

In 2006 he performed at Barres de rire, unpublished stand-up show. He and Thomas go on stage at the Théâtre de Ménilmontant.

In 2007, he participated with many personalities in the Cannes et Banlieues festival, a project initiated and carried out by the Luc Besson Foundation.

In 2008 Yassine Belattar made an appearance in the clip Banlieusards by Kery James, with other personalities such as Jean-Marc Mormeck, Diam's, Omar Sy, Fred Musa, Rachid Djaïdani, Lilian Thuram, Mohamed Dia, Ekoué, Jacky Ido or even JoeyStarr.

Kyan Khojandi appeared in his show Le Belattar Show and On achève bien l'info on France 4.

On March 28, 2019, he was suspended by Radio Nova due to his indictment for death threats and moral harassment, he returned to the air in April 2013. At the end of June 2019, the host announced the end of his show, Les 30 Glorieuses, which he had hosted with Thomas Barbazan since October 2016 on Radio Nova. He continues his collaboration with Thomas Barbazan with L'Heure de Gloire available as a podcast, on Deezer.
