= Anne de Tinguy =

French historian (born 1950)

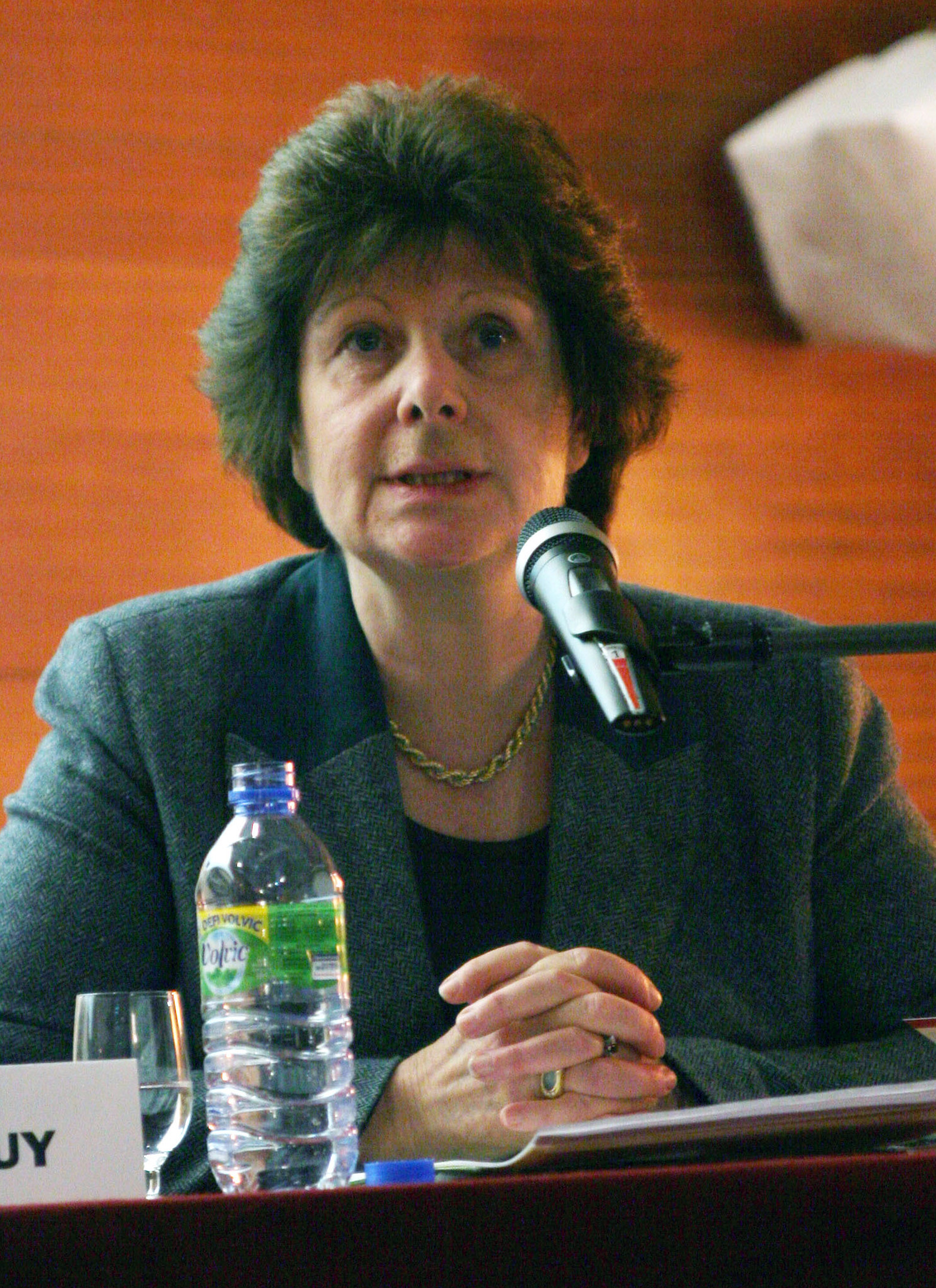
- Anne de Tinguy at a colloquium in 2009
- Education: University of Paris 1 Pantheon-Sorbonne; Institut national des langues et civilisations orientales
- Scientific career
- Fields: Political science
- Workplaces: Institut national des langues et civilisations orientales; Instituts d'études politiques; Centre de recherches internationales

Anne de Tinguy (born 1950) is a French historian and political scientist. Since 2005 she has been a University Professor of contemporary history at the Institut national des langues et civilisations orientales. She studies international relations, specializing in the foreign policy of Russia and Ukraine, as well as migration studies.

== Career ==
Anne de Tinguy graduated from the Institut national des langues et civilisations orientales (National Institute of Oriental Languages and Civilizations), where she obtained a doctorate in political science in 1981, and in 2003 she earned her research director habilitation.

After obtaining her doctorate, Tinguy became a professor at the Centre de recherches internationales (fr). From 1989 to 1990 she lectured at the Institut des hautes études de la défense nationale, and she has also lectured at the Instituts d'études politiques.

In 2000, Tinguy became the vice-president of the French Association of Ukrainian Studies. She also directs the French-Russian double master's degree in International Affairs at the IEP in Paris and the Moscow State Institute of International Relations.

Anne de Tinguy's work on international relations involving Russia and Ukraine has been cited, or she has been interviewed, in news outlets such as Libération, RFI, The Conversation, Vatican News, and HuffPost.

== Selected works ==
- USA-URSS, la détente, Complexe (fr), 1985 ISBN 978-2870271599
- Les relations soviéto-américaines, Presses Universitaires de France, Volume 2348 in the collection Que sais-je ?, 1987, ISBN 978-2130399544
- Les années Gorbatchev. L'URSS de 1985 à 1991, with Marie-Agnès Crosnier and Jean Gueit, Documentation française, 1993, ISBN 978-2110029706
- L'Effondrement de l'empire soviétique, Bruylant (fr), 1998, ISBN 978-2802711490
- L'Ukraine, nouvel acteur du jeu international, Bruylant (fr), 2001, ISBN 978-2275019949
- Contribution à l'étude de la puissance dans le monde de l'après-Guerre froide. Le cas de la Russie, Institut d'études politiques de Paris, 2003
- Moscou et le monde, 2008, ISBN 978-2746710740
