= Jul (writer) =

French cartoonist and comic writer

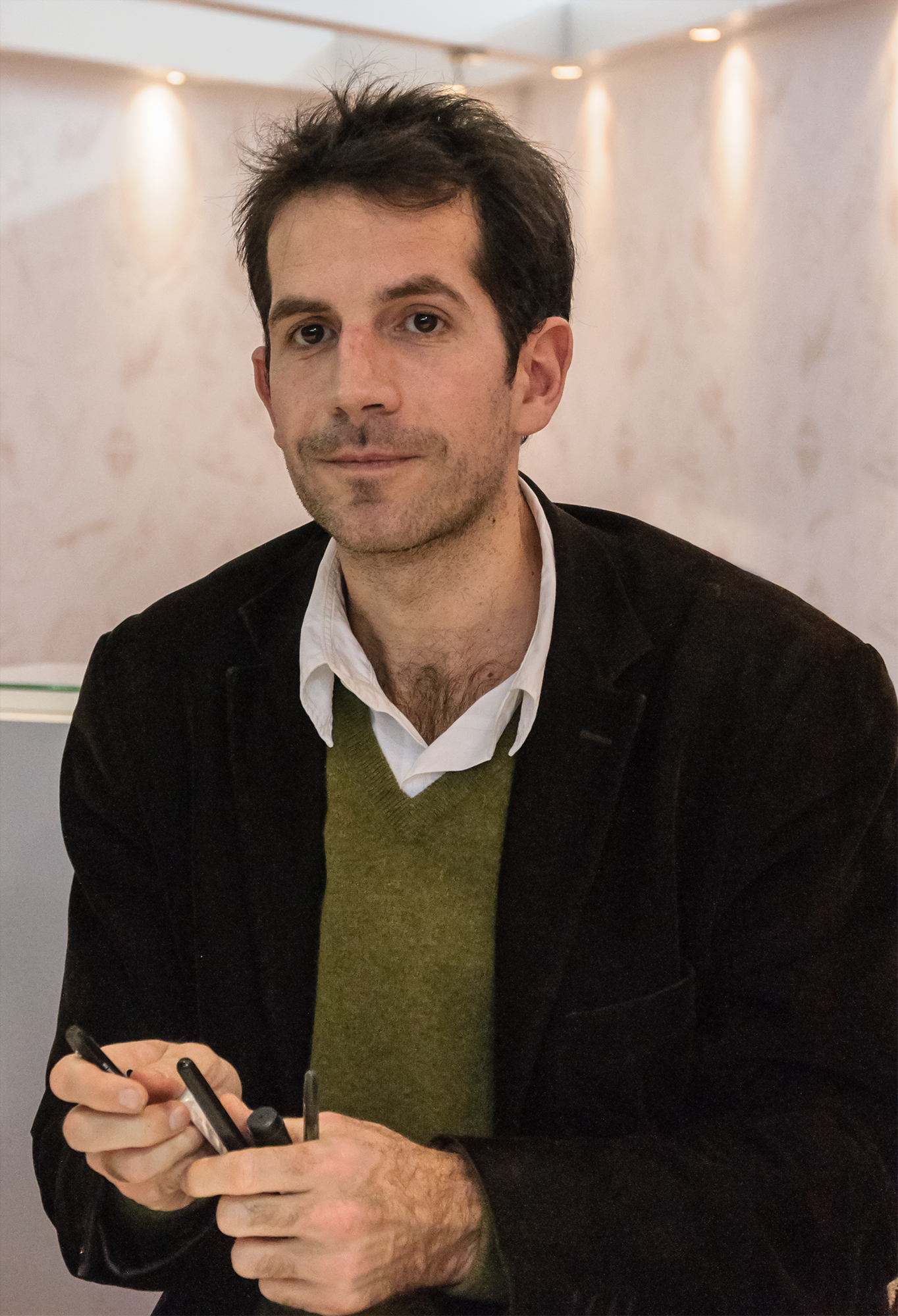
- Born: Julien Berjeaut; April 11, 1974 (age 52) Maisons-Alfort, France
- Notable works: Silex and the City
- Awards: Ordre des Arts et des Lettres

Julien Berjeaut, known as Jul (born April 11, 1974), is a French cartoonist and comic book author. Jul's most famous creation is Silex and the City.

== Awards ==
- 2012 Ordre des Arts et des Lettres
- 2016 Ordre des Arts et des Lettres
