= Yakari =

Belgian comic series

- Yakari #1 (1977)

Publication information
- Publisher: Le Lombard (French); Cinebook (English)
- Format: Ongoing series
- Genre: Graphic Novel
- Publication date: December 1969
- No. of issues: 42 (in French); 20 (in English)

Creative team
- Created by: Derib & Job
- Written by: Job (André Jobin) (1973–2016); Joris Chamblain (2016–present)
- Artist: Derib (Claude de Ribaupierre)

Yakari is a Swiss comic book series, aimed at a younger audience, originally written by Job, and illustrated by Derib, both from Switzerland. The series is now written by Frenchman Joris Chamblain.

Yakari is one of the best-known Franco-Belgian comics in Europe. Yakari has (on two occasions, 1983 and 2005) been adapted into a cartoon series on television. A French animated movie adaptation was released in 2020.

== Concept ==
Yakari is a young Sioux Native American who has the ability to understand and speak animal languages. During his adventures, he meets all sorts of North American animals. His best friends are a Sioux girl, "Rainbow", a Sioux boy "Buffalo Seed" and his pony "Little Thunder". He has a totem animal, "Great Eagle", who frequently appears to him to give him critical advice.

The setting is the North American Great Plains, mainly. Horses have already been introduced by the Spanish, but there is no mention of white men whatsoever in the series. (In one book, there is even an observation by an old tribesman that there is a mystery as to how the horse came to the land, and that it has not always been there.) It can therefore be assumed that Yakari's adventures take place after the 15th century, but long before the settling rush in the late 18th/19th century.

The comic shows a very positive view of the culture of the Sioux and depicts them as peaceful people who live in harmony with nature.

== Characters ==
(English names; original French names in brackets when available, unless universally applicable)

Humans:

- Yakari: the main character. He is a little Sioux boy and has the ability to talk with animals; this gift was given by Great Eagle, Yakari's totem. Unlike the other young boys, Yakari rejects the use of weapons; he is also the only Sioux in the comic whose name does not mean anything further (like "Little Big-Shot").

Yakari, the series main character

- Rainbow (Arc-en-Ciel): A Sioux girl and Yakari's best friend. She knows of and genuinely admires his special ability, and often accompanies him on his adventures, and learns the ways of healing from Yakari's mother.
- The-One-Who-Knows (Celui-qui-sait): chief and shaman of Yakari's village, and one of the first persons to understand that Yakari has a rare gift. He is the oldest and wisest man in the village. In the cartoon, he is known as Wise One.
- Buffalo Seed (Graine-de-Bison): A Sioux boy and rivaling friend of Yakari's, who dreams of becoming the greatest hunter. He is more aggressive than Yakari, and shows an interest in martial sports (wrestling and bowshooting). He often wears only a loincloth and despite his age, is possibly the best archer in Yakari's village.
- Slow Caribou (Élan-lent): A man from Yakari's village. As his name points out, he is very slow, always roving about in a half-sleeping pace. In the cartoon, he is called Slow Strider.
- Broth Eye (Œil-de-bouillon): A man from Yakari's village. He is extremely lazy and unfit, and spends the day lying in front of his tipi and smoking his pipe. In the cartoon, he is called Eyes-Always-Shut, because every time he is seen he is taking a nap, and often someone steps on his belly.
- Tranquil Rock (Roc-Tranquille): A sage from Yakari's village.
- Bold Gaze (Regard-Droit): Yakari's father. At first quite skeptical about his son's claims that he can talk to animals, he is eventually convinced that his son does indeed have a special gift.
- Braid Night (Tresse-de-nuit): Yakari's mother, who is skilled in healing lore. In the cartoon she is called Midnight Braids.
- Taut Bow (Arc-tendu): A cruel and arrogant wandering warrior who is obsessed with hunting and bringing down the rarest and most unusual of animals. He has clashed with Yakari on several occasions and considers him to be his most personal enemy. In the cartoon, he is called Quick Bow.
- Moon-Spirit (Esprit-de-Lune): A crone who heals animals.

Mounts and wild animals:

- Little Thunder (Petit Tonnerre): A white-and-black dappled Pinto pony stallion, who is Yakari's steed and closest friend. He refuses to wear a saddle or reins, so Yakari rides him bareback.
- Double-Tooth (Double-Dent): A beaver and artist.
- Tilia (Tilleul): A young beaver, practical joker and adventurer.
- Wild Rose Plant (Rosier-Sauvage): A beaver, and Tilia's mother.
- Rough Bark (Rude-Écorce): A beaver, and Tilia's father.
- Thousand Mouths (Mille-Gueules): A beaver and builder.
- Wood of a Bed (Bois-de-Lit): A beaver and a serious sleeper.
- Flying Squirrel: A young flying squirrel and one of Yakari's friends.
- The Grizzly: Originally a savage rogue bear who terrorized the animals of the Great Plains, he has since learned humility and is now one of Yakari's friends.
- Snowball (Boule-de-Neige): A young white bear who has suffered the stigma of being different until he makes a friend in Yakari. He has twice been targeted by Drawn Bow, who collects the furs of white animals, and saved by Yakari both times.
- Carcajou: A belligerent wolverine who acts as a recurring antagonist for Yakari, and tried several times to eat his beaver and flying squirrel friends. He mellows out a bit after Yakari helps him on a few occasions.

Totem animals:

- Great Eagle (Grand-Aigle): A great bald eagle and Yakari's totem who aids Yakari with his wisdom and advice, and is the one who gave Yakari the gift of talking to animals.
- Nanabozo (Nanabozo): A rabbit capable of doing magical feats, and Rainbow's totem. He has revealed himself to Rainbow and Yakari on numerous occasions and taken them on educative journeys, including a trip into prehistoric times.

== Albums ==
Series logo

The books have been translated into at least 18 languages including English, Portuguese, German, Dutch, the Scandinavian languages, Finnish, Breton, Indonesian, Polish, Chinese, Turkish, Arabic, Inuktitut, Catalan and Greek.

=== Original French versions ===
Only the original French language publication is indicated.

1. Yakari (Dargaud, 1973)
2. Yakari et le bison blanc (Casterman, 1976)
3. Chez les castors (Casterman, 1977)
4. Yakari et Nanabozo (Casterman, 1978)
5. Yakari et le grizzly (Casterman, 1979)
6. Le secret de Petit Tonnerre (Casterman, 1981)
7. L'étranger (Casterman, 1982)
8. Au pays des loups (Casterman, 1983)
9. Les prisonniers de l'île (Casterman, 1983)
10. Le grand terrier (Casterman, 1984)
11. La toison blanche (Casterman, 1985)
12. Yakari et le coyote (Casterman, 1986)
13. Yakari et les seigneurs des plaines (Casterman, 1987)
14. Le vol des corbeaux (Casterman, 1988)
15. La rivière de l'oubli (Casterman, 1989)
16. Le premier galop (Casterman, 1990)
17. Le monstre du lac (Casterman, 1991)
18. L'oiseau de neige (Casterman, 1992)
19. La barrière de feu (Casterman, 1993)
20. Le diable des bois (Casterman, 1994)
21. Le souffleur de nuages (Casterman, 1995)
22. La fureur du ciel (Casterman, 1996)
23. Yakari et les cornes fourchues (Casterman, 1997)
24. Yakari et l'ours fantôme (Casterman, 1998)
25. Le mystère de la falaise (Le Lombard, 1999)
26. La vengeance du carcajou (Le Lombard, 2000)
27. Yakari et Longues-Oreilles (Le Lombard, 2001)
28. Le chêne qui parlait (Le Lombard, 2002)
29. Le réveil du géant (Le Lombard, 2003)
30. Le marcheur de nuit (Le Lombard, 2004)
31. Yakari et les Appaloosas (Le Lombard, 2005)
32. Les griffes de l'ours (Le Lombard, 2006)
33. Le marais de la peur (Le Lombard, 2007)
34. Le retour du lapin magicien (Le Lombard, 2008)
35. L'escapade de l'ourson (Le Lombard, 2009)
36. Le lézard de l'ombre (Le Lombard, 2011)
37. Le mangeur d'étoiles (Le Lombard, 2012)
38. Yakari et la tueuse des mers (Le Lombard, 2014)
39. Le jour de silence (Le Lombard, 2016)
40. L'esprit des chevaux (Le Lombard, 2019)
41. Le fils de l’aigle (Le Lombard, 2020)
42. La colère de Thathanka (Le Lombard, 2022)

=== English versions ===
Cinebook Ltd is the current publisher for the English version of the series. Cinebook has been translating and publishing the volumes in their original French order of publication, but have skipped volume 14, Le vol des corbeaux (The Flight of the Crows).

1. Yakari and Great Eagle, 2005, ISBN 1-905460-04-X
2. Yakari and the White Buffalo, 2005, ISBN 1-905460-05-8
3. Yakari and the Beavers, 2006, ISBN 1-905460-09-0
4. Yakari and the Grizzly, 2006, ISBN 1-905460-16-3
5. Yakari and the Stranger, 2007, ISBN 978-1-905460-27-4
6. Yakari in the Land of Wolves, 2008, ISBN 978-1-905460-29-8
7. Yakari: The Island Prisoners, 2009, ISBN 978-1-84918-010-8
8. Yakari and the White Fleece, 2010, ISBN 978-1-84918-055-9
9. Yakari and the Coyote, 2011, ISBN 978-1-84918-101-3
10. Yakari: The River of Forgetfulness, 2012, ISBN 978-1-84918-140-2
11. Yakari and Nanabhozo, 2013, ISBN 978-1-84918-177-8
12. Yakari: Little Thunder's Secret, 2014, ISBN 978-1-84918-223-2
13. Yakari: The Great Burrow, 2015, ISBN 978-1-84918-272-0
14. Yakari: Lords of the Plains, 2016, ISBN 978-1-84918-318-5
15. Yakari: The First Gallop, 2018, ISBN 978-1-84918-369-7
16. Yakari: The Lake Monster, 2019, ISBN 978-1-84918-423-6
17. Yakari: The Snow Bird, 2020, ISBN 978-1-84918-460-1
18. Yakari: The Wall of Fire, 2020, ISBN 978-1-84918-591-2
19. Yakari: The Devil of the Woods, 2021, ISBN 978-1-80044-037-1
20. Yakari: The Cloud Maker, 2023, ISBN 978-1-80044-074-6
21. Yakari: Fury From The Skies, 2023, ISBN 978-1-80044-119-4
22. Yakari and the Pronghoms, 2024, ISBN 978-180044-144-6
23. Yakari and the Ghost Bear, 2025, ISBN 978-180044-173-6

== Adaptations ==
=== Audio ===
In 1983, the French-language vinyl record Salut Yakari was released by CBS Disques. Since 2009, several German-language CD's have been released with told comic stories.

=== Television series ===
Original stories involving original and additional characters were written for two television series. The 1983 version, made in French for the French station Antenne 2 and also aired by the Swiss Télévision suisse romande (TSR), had 52 episodes. The 2005 version, also in French, was a Franco-Belgian co-production made for France 3 and RTBF. An initial season of 52 episodes was followed by three more, 26 episodes each, and nine more episodes on VHS and DVD. The fourth season is different from previous seasons as it is completely CG-animated. A movie sequel is in the making. The series was nominated for the TVFI Export award.

=== Animated film ===
A French animated film adaptation, Yakari, A Spectacular Journey, was released in France on 12 August 2020. The film has grossed $3,734,725 in France, Germany, and Hungary, and it has sold 454,806 tickets in France and Germany.

=== Musical ===
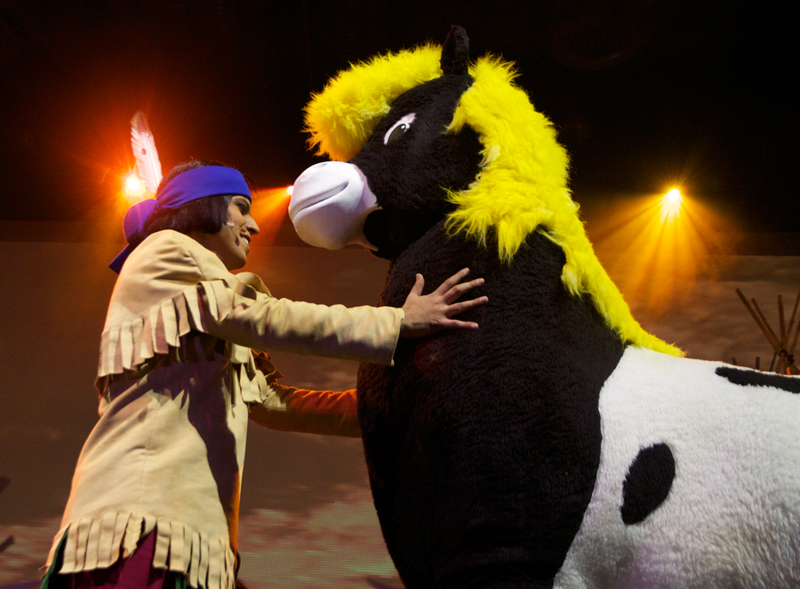
Scene from the German musical

A German musical from 2013 was named Yakari - Freunde fürs Leben (English: Yakari - Friends for life).

=== Video game ===
The Mystery of Four Seasons is a platform game released for Nintendo 3DS in 2015.

=== Theatre tour ===
A horse show tour in Germany, named Yakari und Kleiner Donner, started in 2023.

=== Toy figures ===
In 1984, the Schleich company released collectible figures of characters from the show. Similar figures were later released by companies like Bullyland or Tonies.

There was also at least one Yakari set of Playmobil.

== See also ==
• Marcinelle school
