= Carland Cross (character) =

- Carland Cross character
- First appearance: 1990
- Last appearance: 2003
- Created by: Michel Oleffe
- Portrayed by: Olivier Grenson

In-universe information
- Gender: Male
- Occupation: Private investigator
- Family: Brian George Cross (Father); Millicent Mitchell (Mother)
- Nationality: English

Carland Cross is a fictional character and the protagonist in the series of the same name. Created by Belgian author and illustrator Michel Oleffe and Olivier Grenson in late 1989, he made his first comic book appearance in 1990. He also went on to appear in a total of eight novels.

His first fantasy story, Le Golem, was later followed by further comic book publications. Due to the initial success of the character, the creators published in 1994 a series of four of the eight comics in the form of an animated series of 26 episodes simply called Carland Cross.

As with Sherlock Holmes and Hercule Poirot, he is a "private investigator" based in London in the 1930s. He specializes in curious, inexplicable cases, strange conspiracies and others.

== Life ==
=== Early life ===
Carland Cross is born in July 1893 in St Austell, Cornwall to Brian George Cross, the Lord Duvendon (an officer in the Indian Army) and Lady Millicent Mitchell. As a teenager, he first studied away from his parents in the London's Slade School of Fine Art and then to Cambridge University where the young Carland differs in philosophy and Oriental and rare languages.

Although the quality of the studies to an academic career, he preferred to leave the University in 1914 to fight the enemies of his country on the battlefields of northern France during the World War I. This is where he met Murdock, a young Prussian officer, Cross injured his hand during an engagement with the army of Kaizer while the latter injures his shoulder. Repatriated because of that shoulder injury, Cross resumed studying psychology and criminology who will decide his calling.

He entered Scotland Yard as an aspiring inspector in 1920, then quickly quit the police, which he deemed due to inappropriate methods, to open his own firm in Baker Street. In the coming years, his many accomplishments have earned him a reputation as a specialist in flattering intractable cases.

== Appearance and personality ==
Cross is physically a tall, average, understated stylish Briton. His age is not revealed in the comics and animated series but it is estimated at early to mid 40s as the stories are set in the mid to late 1930s. His serious pale face is recognized by his eternal frown-eyebrows, blue eyes, sideburns, black hair with a free cloth wick on his right forehead. He is usually wear a hat, a brown trenchcoat, dark-blue suit, black waistcoat, white dress shirt, blue tie and black shoes with white gaiters. Alternative costumes are rarely seen in the series, except a running outfit. His tailor, Wallace Cripps, own a shop on Savile Row. His shoemaker, Italian Battistoli's, is based near Oxford Street. Cross drives a Bentley car and smokes a pipe, only the Navy Cut, from the Dunhill's house of Jermyn Street prepares for him; in the animated series, he does not smoke either cigar, cigarettes or pipes.

There are small differences between the comics and the series with Carland Cross' personality. In the former, he is a composed, generous, honest, intelligent, methodical, practical and talented British citizen. Cross uses the money earned during their investigations to alleviate the miseries of his contemporaries. In the animated series, even if he is still sensitive to the suffering of others, upholding justice and fairness, he is sometimes depicted as a more frigid, cynical, and moody character. He would tend to overlook the simple human feelings, and had arguable hints of sexism, with women being indifferent to him. Although not particularly brave, he could sometimes be prone to reckless decisions, such as when the lives of his associates are in danger.

== Methods of detection ==
=== Knowledge and skills ===
His clue-based working method is mostly referred to the books. It is through documentary research and thinking it progresses in its investigations, it served by the incredible resources of his culture and intelligence. His thinking is complete and takes action. It is an active casual but gaining in power and resistance that it loses rapidly.

According to Andy White's single student:

He unraveled the mystery with an exceptional intellect and intuition. He knew most sciences, had read several books and is fluent in certain languages of the world, even rarer. He understood everything before the police and that is why Scotland Yard was the most frequently called upon only at the last end and as usual was silent while keeping his head cool even in the most horrible murders scenes.
