= Carland Cross (TV series) =

1996 animated detective television series

- Intertitle
- Created by: Michel Oleffe; Olivier Grenson
- Developed by: Michel Oleffe; Emmanuel Errer; Gérald Dupeyrot
- Directed by: Michel Oleffe; Olivier Grenson
- Starring: Ellen David; Dean Hagopian; Thor Bishopric; Mark Camacho; Terrence Scammell; Hubert Fielden
- Theme music composer: Didier Ledan; Joseph Refalo
- Countries of origin: France; Belgium; Spain; Luxembourg; Canada
- Original languages: English; France
- No. of seasons: 1
- No. of episodes: 26

Production
- Executive producer: François St. Laurent
- Producers: Jacques Vercruyssen; Violette Vercruyssen; Didier Brunner; Enrique Uviedo
- Running time: 26 minutes
- Production companies: Les Armateurs; Odec Kid Cartoons; Motion Pictures, S.A. Monipoly; TVA Animation

Original release
- Network: Belgium: BRTN, RTBF; France: Canal+, Télétoon, TF1; Quebec: Super Écran, TVA
- Release: February 8, 1996 – July 9, 1997

Carland Cross was a 1996 animated detective television series developed with the collaboration of Belgian, French and Canadian broadcasters. It spanned 26 episodes (each 26 minutes in length) and was based on the comics The Adventures of Carland Cross, by Belgian natives Olivier Grenson and Michel Oleffe. Carland Cross tells the story of a fictional British private investigator specializing in curious and inexplicable cases. The series aired late 1996 under the French-language title Carland Coss and in other markets, such as Spanish, as Las aventuras de Carland Cross.

The series is a co-production between Les Armateurs and TF1 in France, Odec Kid Cartoons and RTBF in Belgium, Motion Pictures, S.A. in Spain, Monipoly in Luxembourg and TVA Animation in Canada.

Of the 26 episodes, only 3 stories of the original print comic were used: 'The Golem', 'The Monster Under Sea' (The Tunnel), and 'The Mysteries of The Loch Ness'.

Although the television series remains unknown in international television, the animated television series was a success in the late 1990s to early 2000s in European countries such as Belgium, France, Italy, Spain, Switzerland. However, it was also popular in South America, especially in Argentina.

== Background ==
=== Plot ===
Carland Cross, a typical British private detective from the 1930s era, is called upon to investigate cases of the strange and mysterious. Cross attempts to solve cases involving ancient ruins, forbidden regions, strange inexplicable murders, criminal Satanic curses, deserted cities and an array of unimaginable monsters. The central storyline is set in the United Kingdom, mainly London, which is depicted as a mysterious drowned city of fog where crime is prevalent, and with it, apprehension and danger.

== Characters ==
=== Protagonist ===
Carland Cross: A calculated and methodical British private investigator from Baker Street in London, working alongside the police officials. He shares his investigations with his pupil, Andy White, the aristocrat fervent admirer Medwenna Simpson, and is often helped by the Superintendent Marmaduke Wingfield.

==== Heroes ====
- Andy White: Born in Whitechapel in 1916, Andrew White is Cross's hotheaded pupil. Although the teenager is angry and feisty, he is considered a promising young amateur detective with a heart of gold. His essential function in the series is to seek explanations, by undertaking the writing of the memoirs of his master Carland Cross, who is a depicted as a loner to the viewers. His clumsiness also serves as a source of unexpected action for audiences.
- Mrs. Stone: Approximately sixty years of age, Mildred Stone is a sympathetic governess and an admired cook. She ensures that Cross and White are fed, and oversees the detective. Mrs. Stone disagrees with the occupation of her two proteges.
- Medwenna Simpson: Partially inspired by Medwenna McGuire, Simpson is a good-looking aristocrat with green eyes and red mane, whose occupation is as a novelist. Since her unexpected encounter with Carland Cross in The Derby, Miss Simpson got the idea to write the biography of the great detective. To do this, she investigates constantly, which leads to her and Cross becoming close collaborators.
- Marmaduke Wingfield: One of the London Superintendents of Police. He is gruff, grumpy, and nervous, In the series, Marmaduke Wingfield embodies the authority and force only the rank of Superintendent can mobilize when the circumstances and necessities of the investigation so require. His relations with Carland Cross are complex. Often complicit, they may also be viewed as competitors.

==== Villains ====
- Murdock: The main antagonist in most of the series and Carland Cross' sinister arch-enemy. Murdock is a Prussian international adventurer, mercenary, smuggler and spy, wounded in the left hand by Carland Cross in 1914 whilst fighting for the Kaizer. He has long silver hair, wears a monocle, a cigarette holder and a weapon. He is a ruthless, stateless, and venal sociopath who is opposed to any form of law and discipline, instead thirsting for power, conspiracy and revenge. Murdock has a score to settle with England because of Carland Cross.
- Snoops: Murdock's brutish henchman, Bardolph Snoops is a big, thick skulled man, with long black hair. He is somewhat intelligent, a bit naïve and cowardly, and has limited conversation.

== Conception and history ==
Carland Cross's crime comics, created in 1990, were inspired by works of well-known authors of the time, such as Agatha Christie, Arthur Conan Doyle, William Hope Hodgson and Jean Ray. In 1994, Olivier Grenson had the idea to make a computer animation of Carland Cross. With a friend, owner of the studio ASAP, he began to select a series of images in albums and edit them into a short sequence in which he added some effects and a soundtrack to a text by Michel Oleffe. After contacting the Belgian animation professional studio ODEC-Kid Cartoons, they started the filming. They quickly decided to produce an animation pilot. Michel Oleffe provided a scenario from the Mystery of Loch Ness. The pilot was presented at a congress of animation, the Azores, in 1995. Given the interest generated by the pilot, a financial arrangement was concluded quickly and Odec-Kid Cartoons with French and Canadian partners got into production.

Olivier Grenson and Michel Oleffe, the creator and the publisher, later released their comics in a rare 3D animated series for kids and adults that contained influences from the crime, suspense, and supernatural genre, as well as some cryptic themes. The series, which had 26 episodes of 26 minutes, was completed in 1997.

== Episodes ==
=== Season 1 (1996) ===
| No. | Title |
|---|---|
| 1 | "The Lions of Venice" |
| 2 | "The time creature" |
| 3 | "The theater of the damned" |
| 4 | "Skylights" |
| 5 | "The Secret of the Minotaur" |
| 6 | "The Golem" |
| 7 | "The shadow of the Titanic" |
| 8 | "The cursed rosette" |
| 9 | "Thirteen tables" |
| 10 | "The Devil's brood" |
| 11 | "The court of Kali" |
| 12 | "Song of the Siren" |
| 13 | "The Phantom of the British Museum" |
| 14 | "The street that did not exist" |
| 15 | "The house of vengeance" |
| 16 | "The Glacier cannibal" |
| 17 | "The Black Mirror" |
| 18 | "The mystery of Loch Ness" |
| 19 | "The monster under the sea" |
| 20 | "The Treasure of Marco Polo" |
| 21 | "The vampire of Highgate" |
| 22 | "Operation Medusa" |
| 23 | "The ghost of Lord Plunkett" |
| 24 | "The banquet of ashes" |
| 25 | "The Devil from Shanghai" |
| 26 | "The Egon Stein's machine" |

== DVD releases ==
It was released on DVD only in Spain between 1999 and 2000 in a slim-lined box set.

== See also ==
- Blake and Mortimer (TV series)
- Night Hood
