= Lou! =

French series of comic books created by Julien Neel

Lou! is a French comic book series and animated television series created by Julien Neel. The comic is published by Glénat and the animated series is broadcast in France on M6 and Disney Channel. The main comic's first "season" came to an end in 2018 after eight volumes, although a prequel series titled Le petit monde de Lou was released in 2019, with the second "season" titled Lou! Sonata beginning with the ninth volume in 2020.

== Characters ==
- Lou- The title character, a twelve-year-old blonde girl (by the ninth comic volume she is 20) who is lively, funny, creative and independent - but also frustrated that she is shorter than most of her peers. She lives with her mother in an apartment, in the fifth volume they move to a new house after the apartment building burns down. Her best friend is Mina, and she has a crush on her neighbor, Tristan. She also owns a nameless cat. A recurring theme is the inversion of the mother-daughter relationship where the daughter acts more responsibly than her mother.
- Emma - A woman 34 years old and the single mother of Lou. She appears to have her eyes always hidden under her hair and wears large glasses. When she was younger, she was rebellious and troublesome and fell in love with a rock musician. The rock musician leaves her when he learns that she is pregnant and she ends up raising her daughter, Lou, all by herself. She managed to finished her studies and becomes the author of a science fiction novel called Sidera: The Space Wanderer which achieved moderate success. Lou's mother is a fan of video games and the band Queen. Thanks to Lou, she starts a relationship with her new neighbor Richard, and in the fifth volume she is pregnant again, with Richard being the father. However, Richard leaves her because of an apparent nervous breakdown over how to raise the new baby. In the end, the baby is born and is named Fulgor, becoming Lou's little half-brother.
- Mina- A black girl who is Lou's best friend since kindergarten. She has a strong and slightly aggressive attitude, so it is not uncommon for her and Lou to argue, but they always make up in the end. Her parents divorce in the first volume, and she lives with her mother, who works as an executive, on a higher class apartment.
- Tristan- A boy with brown hair, who was Lou's neighbor during the first volume (at the end he moves to another city), and is also her secret crush since kindergarten. Tristan seems oblivious to this, but they are hints that he may also have feelings for her. On the fifth volume, he invites Lou to spend some days on his uncle's winter cottage, where they share their first kiss, likely signaling the start of a formal relationship. However, he does not appear in the sixth volume, where it is hinted that he and Lou have broken up. He likes to practice the acoustic guitar, and is also a fan of video games, sharing this hobby with Lou's mother.
- Richard- Lou's 31-year-old neighbor, who moved to their building in the first volume, being of a small village named Super Chevelle. Thanks to Lou, he and Lou's mother begin a relationship, but separate during the fifth volume and he does not appear in the sixth. He works at a record store, and was formerly a curling player.
- Cat- Lou's pet cat (unclear if it is male or female), with the characteristic of not having an official name, being differently named often by Lou or her mother. Its names include: Mongo-Elvis, Super Satori, Chachoomoo, Hulk, Thinny, etc. It's grey and small.
- Grandmother- Lou's grandmother and Emma's 65-year-old mother. She is always grumpy and complains about everything. She is a very bitter person but she has a heart. she likes cauliflower and watches the show "glamour" every day even though she claims to think it's stupid.
- Paul- A guy Lou meets while visiting her grandmother. At first she thought he was a creep, but as it turned out he was pretty cool. He likes Hawaii and paints Hawaii-themed paintings and writes songs.

== Comic ==
- Volume 1: Journal infime (2004) ISBN 978-2-7234-4275-6 [English (1) EU: Diary Dates 978-1905496105 (2) World incl. USA: Secret Diary 978-0761388685]
- Volume 2: Mortebouse (2005) ISBN 978-2-7234-4815-4 [English Summertime Blues (1) EU: 978-1905496112 (2) World incl. USA: 978-0761388692]
- Volume 3: Le cimetière des autobus (2006) ISBN 978-2-7234-5252-6 [English Down in the Dumps (1) EU: 978-1905496129 (2) World incl. USA: 978-0822591658]
- Volume 4: Idylles (2007) ISBN 978-2-7234-5869-6 [English (1) EU: Romances 978-1905496136 (2) World incl. USA: The Perfect Summer 978-0822591696]
- Volume 5: Laser Ninja (2009) ISBN 978-2-7234-6788-9 [English EU: ISBN 978-1-905496-14-3]
- Volume 6: L'Age de Cristal (2012) ISBN 978-2-7234-8426-8
- Volume 7: La cabane (2016) ISBN 978-2-8001-6426-7
- Volume 8: En route vers de nouvelles aventures (2018) ISBN 978-2-3440-2359-4
- Volume 9: Sonata 1: Premier mouvement (2020) ISBN 978-2-3440-3804-8
- Volume 10: Sonata 2 (2023) ISBN 978-2-3440-4974-7

== Reception ==
Volume 1, Journal infime, received the Youth Award for ages 9 to 12 at the Angoulême Festival in 2005. Volume 5, Laser Ninja, won the award for best youth comic at the Angoulême Festival in 2010.

== Animation ==
The first comic volume, Journal infime, was adapted into 52 12-minute episodes. The series was produced by GO-N Productions in association with M6 Télévision and Disney Channel France, directed by Jérôme Mouscadet, character design adaptation by David Gilson, screenplay by Jean-Rémi François and Anna Fregonese.

== Live-action movie ==
A live-action film adaptation based on the comic was released in France on October 8, 2014, but it was filmed on 28 October 2013.
