= Job (comics) =

Swiss francophone comics creator (1927–2024)

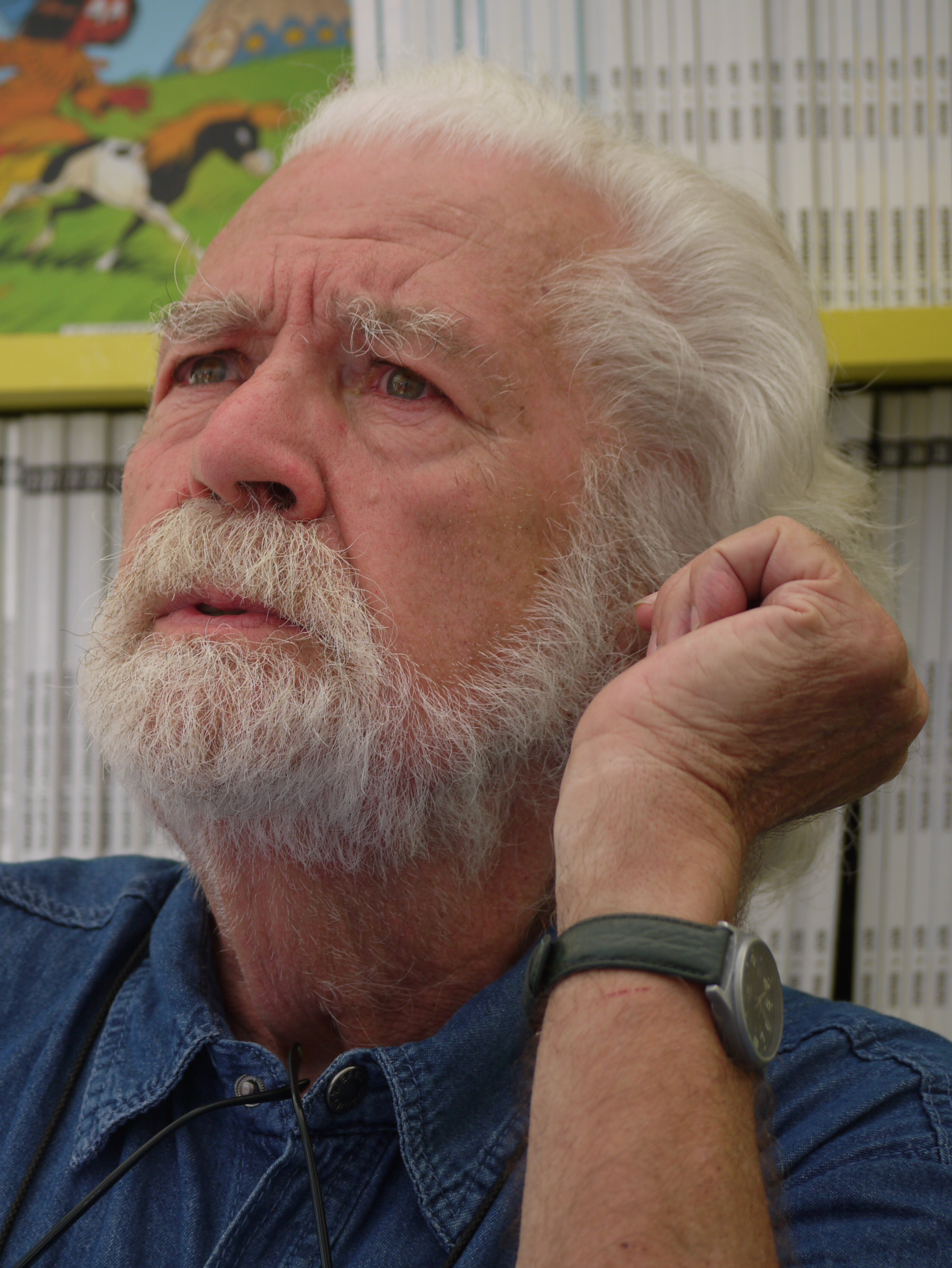
- Job in 2009
- Born: André Jobin; 25 October 1927 Delémont, Jura, Switzerland
- Died: 8 October 2024 (aged 96)
- Notable works: Yakari

André Jobin (25 October 1927 – 8 October 2024), known as Job, was a Swiss francophone comics creator. He is probably best known for his western children's comics series Yakari, for which he wrote the scripts from 1973 until 2016.

== Biography ==
André Jobin was born in Delémont, Switzerland. He became a journalist and founded Le Crapaud à lunettes in 1964, a magazine for children.

In 1967, Job met Derib and hired him. In 1967 they published The Adventures of the Owl Pythagore together.

In 1969, Job created the series Yakari, drawn by Derib.

In 1991, Job was awarded the Masters of Honor at the Sierre Comics Festival for his career.

In 2016 Job wrote his last story about Yakari after which Joris Chamblain continued the work with Derib.

Job died on 8 October 2024, at the age of 96.

== Series ==
- The Adventures of the Owl Pythagore (three albums)
- Yakari (39 albums) (1973–2016)
