= Michelin (surname) =

Michelin is a surname. Notable people with the surname include:

- André Michelin (1853–1931), French industrialist
- Clément Michelin (born 1997), French footballer
- Édouard Michelin, multiple people
- Étienne Michelin (1898–1932), French industrialist
- François Michelin (1926–2015), French industrialist
- Jean Michelin (1616–1670), French painter
- Nicolas Michelin (born 1955), French architect and urban planner
- Pierre Michelin, multiple people
