= Citroën TUB =

Citroën TUB/TUC
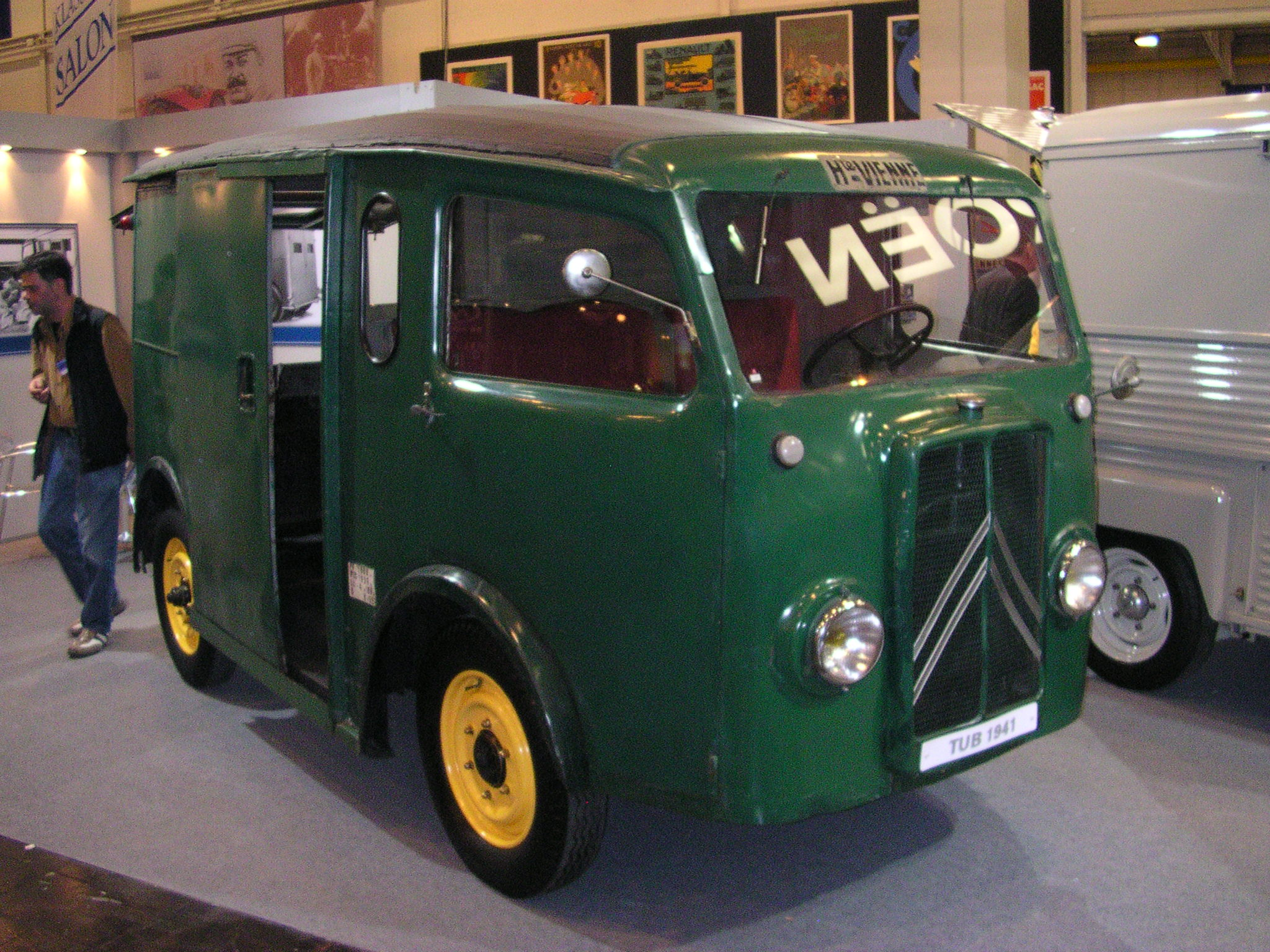

Overview
- Manufacturer: Citroën
- Also called: Citroën Traction Utilitaire Basse; Citroën Traction Utilitaire type B; Citroën Traction Utilitaire type C
- Production: June 1939–1941
- Assembly: France: Paris

Body and chassis
- Class: Van

Powertrain
- Engine: 1.6 L I4 (TUB); 1.9 L I4 (TUC)

Dimensions
- Length: 4,040 mm (159.1 in)
- Width: 1,960 mm (77.2 in)
- Height: 2,130 mm (83.9 in)

Chronology
- Successor: Citroën H

The Citroën TUB (from the French Traction Utilitaire Basse or Traction Utilitaire type B) was a light van produced by Citroën from 1939 through 1941, derived from the Traction Avant passenger car. In May 1941 an upgraded version, the Citroën TUC replaced the TUB, but by the end of that year the last of these vans had probably been produced.

The TUB is the first commercial vehicle ever equipped with a lateral sliding door.

== Origins ==
Pierre Michelin and Pierre-Jules Boulanger were brought in to take charge of Citroën by Michelin following their acquisition of the bankrupt auto-maker in December 1934. During the Summer of 1936 Boulanger received the results of an extensive investigation of customer requirements that he had commissioned. The exercise had been undertaken in preparation for the development of a van of approximately 800 kg (1,764 lb) capacity - slightly more than the load that could be accommodated by a simple car-based van. Boulanger accumulated a large dossier of photographs, statistics, sketches and comments. From this he laid down a specification which was simple and demanding. To maximise available load space, the new van must position the driver as far forwards as possible on the chassis. It should be possible to stand up in the vehicle, and the load area should be accessible from the driving seat, without exiting the vehicle. In addition to conventionally positioned doors at the back, the load area of the new van should have a door on the pavement side to facilitate loading and unloading. The decision had already been taken to base the new van on the running gear of the company's recently introduced front-engined front-wheel drive Citroën Traction, making it easier to meet Boulanger's brief because, without an under-floor drive shaft, the floor of the load space could be kept low.

== The van ==
The Citroën product development department had the first prototype running by the Autumn of 1937, and on 12 May 1939 the van was homologated for sale in the French market. Although low floored vans with the driver set well forwards and sliding side-door on the pavement side would have become relatively mainstream 20 years later, in the 1930s the radical new van was quite unlike anything else available.

The van took its 4-cylinder 35 hp (26 kW) engine, initially of 1628 cc, from the company's Traction 7C. In the car the engine sat comfortably just behind the front wheels, but in the van most of the engine's weight, along with the driver's feet, was ahead of the front wheels. The driver's cab was raised sufficiently to allow most of the mechanical elements to be installed beneath it, although the engine itself intruded from the front into the central portion of the cab. The floor of the load area was just 42 cm (16 inches) above ground level, and it was possible for anyone less than 175 cm tall to stand in it without stooping. Access from the driver's seat to the load area behind was excellent, since on the right side of the driver's cab there was normally no second seat fitted. The side door on the pavement side was a sliding door, and in this respect another radical innovation. The sliding door on the right of the load area was fashioned from light-weight low cost materials. On each side of the load area, the upper side portions of the van's sides consisted tarpaulin-material curtains, incorporating small windows of flexible plastic. Again, the emphasis was on simplicity, saving weight and minimising cost. On the left-side, there being here no side door, the curtain ran the full length of the load area and could be rolled up and fixed to the roof edge, revealing a load space in excess of 6 cubic meters. The overall result was a structure which combined extreme practicality with extreme simplicity. The spare wheel and battery were stored in a locker on the left side of the van, accessible from the outside but completely sealed off from the load area. Production of the van's bodywork was entrusted to coach building firm Fernand Genève.

The engine was the 1,628 cc four-cylinder water-cooled unit which by now powered the 7C version of the manufacturer's Traction passenger car, which also provided the van's three-speed manual transmission and front torsion-bar suspension and front-wheel drive drive train. The van's rear suspension came from a simple leaf-spring arrangement. The 1,020 kg (2,249 lb) carrying capacity was a little greater than had initially been envisaged by Boulanger, which presumably led to a firming of the rear suspension settings. The light weight of the van's body, the lack of weight balance resulting from positioning the engine and driver at the extreme front of the vehicle and the rudimentary nature of the rear suspension meant that drivers quickly learned that without the weight of a load in the van, it was prone to tail slide. The hydraulic braking system also came from the Traction, though the drum brakes were the slightly larger ones from the 1911 cc Traction 11 version.

The 1628 cc TUB went on sale on 5 June 1939, less than four weeks after its homologation. It was priced at 36,000 francs at a time when the base versions of the passenger cars from which it was derived were priced slightly above 26,000 francs.

== The TUB replaced by the TUC ==
In September 1939 France declared war on Germany, and on 13 February 1940 a replacement version of the van appeared, described as the 11-T série U. The "11" in the van's name referred to its promotion to the 11CV taxation class which resulted from an increased engine size, now of 1,911 cc. Since the new vehicle was clearly an improved version of the Citroën TUB, respect for alphabetical logic ensured that it quickly became known as the Citroën TUC. The maximum load capacity was unchanged at 1,020 kg (2,249 lb) but there were numerous detailed improvements including the fitting of a second windscreen wiper to match the one on the driver's side of the screen. This may have been the point at which a small protruding ridge appeared beneath the front panel, apparently as a half-hearted acknowledgement that most motor vehicles of this size featured a front bumper. Despite the German invasion in May/June 1940, the TUB continued in production until the Spring of 1941, and the TUC replaced it on the production lines only in May 1941. By now raw materials for civilian product and fuel for civilian transport were rapidly disappearing. Few TUC vans were produced, and production of them ceased in December 1941.

== Electric conversion ==
During WWII, fuel was scarce in France due to the German invasion in 1940 and Citroën was struggling to sell cars and especially vans.

Fenwick, being experienced with building electric forklifts, utilized the motor and batteries from their forklifts to make an electric version of the TUB, having prior ties with Citroën from selling forklifts to them years prior. With Citroën having extra TUB bodies unsold and with them unable to produce more during the war, they sold Fenwick the bodies for them to deal with production, sales, and marketing.

Fenwick added an electric motor in place of the engine and drivetrain and 540 kg (1,190 lb) of batteries at the rear of the van, reducing payload and the ability to use the rear sliding door. These batteries were positioned in compartments on the sides for air ventilation and easy access for maintenance. Due to this, the spare tire was moved to a compartment over the batteries on the right side of the truck. To differentiate the electric version, the grille was replaced with a solid panel with the Fenwick logo.

Many were sold to be used as ambulances during the war, and so Fenwick created the Société des Ambulances Parisiennes (Parisian Ambulance Company) and commissioned coachbuilder Carrier to adapt the van for transport of people, being able to transport 6 wounded people on stretchers at one time, a feat of engineering for the era. Notably one was used by the city of Paris until 1944.

The van was originally marketed as the Cittub, likely to not appear related to the Citroën counterpart. Later the name was changed to the Fenwick Urbel in 1941 and between one hundred and a few hundred examples were sold between 1941-1942 when production of electric vehicles was banned in the summer of 1942 until the end of the war. This ban likely started due to the production of the Urbel and Peugeot VLV and tried to stop mobility in France during the war.

=== Details ===
- Weight: 1,825 kg (4,023 lb)
- Payload: 1,000 kg (2,200 lb)
- Top speed: 50 km/h (31 mph) (Fenwick recommends only 25 km/h (16 mph) when empty and 20 km/h (12 mph) when loaded to maximize range)

== Commercial ==
Probably only about 1,740 of the vans were produced, most of them being the earlier 1628 cc TUB version which may appear a poor return for the effort that Citroën committed to the project. Nevertheless, when normal life began to return after the war Citroën were quick off the mark in 1946 with the Citroën H which was in many ways a slightly larger and less aggressively light-weight version of the TUB. The commercial success of the long-running H van owed much to its 1939 predecessor.
