= François Michelin =

French businessman (1926–2015)

- Born: 15 June 1926; Clermont-Ferrand, Auvergne, France
- Died: 29 April 2015 (aged 88); Clermont-Ferrand, Auvergne, France
- Occupation: Businessman
- Title: CEO, Michelin
- Term: 1955-1999
- Successor: Édouard Michelin
- Board member of: Michelin
- Spouse: Bernadette Montagne
- Children: 5, including Édouard Michelin
- Parent(s): Étienne Michelin; Madeleine Callies
- Relatives: Édouard Michelin (grandfather); Rémy Montagne (brother-in-law)

François Michelin (15 June 1926 – 29 April 2015) was a French heir and businessman. He was the chief executive officer (CEO) of Michelin from 1955 to 1999. Under his leadership, a family business founded by his grandfather became the leading global tire manufacturer, dominating the market in Europe and the US. A practising Roman Catholic, he was idiosyncratically non-hierarchical and conducted business from his hometown of Clermont-Ferrand in the rural Auvergne.

== Early life ==
François Michelin was born on 15 June 1926 in Clermont-Ferrand, Auvergne, France.

His grandfather, Édouard Michelin, was the founder of Michelin, when it was known as Michelin & Cie. His father was Étienne Michelin and his mother, Madeleine Callies. He became an orphan at the age of ten.

He received a Bachelor of Science in Mathematics.

== Career ==
Michelin started his career in 1951. He worked under a false name with regular factory workers, to learn on the job. He first worked as a fitter, then a driver, and later in sales and marketing.

He served as the CEO of Michelin from 1955 to 1999.

He increased the marketshare from the tenth top tire manufacturer in the world to number one. For example, from 1960 to 1979, he opened twenty-five new factories globally, even as far away as Vietnam. He hired Carlos Ghosn in 1978 to expand Michelin's marketshare in the United States. After he acquired Uniroyal Goodrich Tire Co. in 1990, Michelin dominated the US marketshare. While the buyout incurred debt for the company, Michelin stood firm in his decision to consolidate. By 1994, he was proved right, as the company was solvent again.

He pioneered the use of the radial tire, which became the gold standard of tires globally thanks to him. In 1993, he launched the green tire, which helps cars consume less fuel.

His leadership style was non-hierarchical. He believed in listening to all employees no matter what their ranks or social statuses were. He also believed in letting his employees take risks to innovate. Moreover, he believed business needed to be conducted discreetly and stressed the need for confidentiality.

He became co-Chairman in 1999, when his son Édouard Michelin stepped in. He retired in 2002.

He published And Why Not? The Human Person at the Heart of Business, a non-fiction book published in English by Lexington Books in 2003. A speaker read a text he wrote about the same topic for a conference organized by the Acton Institute in Rome in 2007. He served as the Vice President of the Association Nationale des Sociétés par Actions alongside Edouard de Royère and Bertrand Collomb. He turned down the Legion of Honour.

== Personal life ==
In 1951, he married Bernadette Montagne, whose brother, Rémy Montagne, was a politician and the owner of Famille chrétienne, a Catholic French magazine. They had six children. One of his sons, Édouard Michelin, died in a fishing accident in 2006. They resided at La Bosse, his grandfather's mansion in Orcines near Clermont-Ferrand and summered in the Luberon. He also owned an apartment in the 16th arrondissement of Paris. He flew his own helicopter to go to Paris. His wife died in 2013.

He was a practising Roman Catholic. He shook the hand of Pope John Paul II in Rome in 2004. By the end of his life, he lived at EHPAD Ma Maison, a retirement community run by the Little Sisters of the Poor, a Roman Catholic charity in Clermont-Ferrand.

== Death ==
He died on 29 April 2015 in his hometown of Clermont-Ferrand. He was eighty-eight years old.

French President François Hollande called him, "one of the greatest French industrialists in the postwar years." He added, "He understood the importance of innovation and of long-term industrial development. By developing the radial tire, he transformed a family and regional company into one of the biggest French groups and one of its best-known."

Former employee Carlos Ghosn, who served as the CEO of Renault and Nissan in 2015, called him "a humble and honest man, a humanist boss and captain of industry deeply attached to the global performance of a French industry with solid French roots."

== Awards and honors ==
- 1997: Golden Plate Award of the American Academy of Achievement
- 2008: Tire Industry Association Hall of Fame
