= Micheline =

Micheline may refer to:

== People ==
- Micheline (given name)
- Jack Micheline (1929–1998), pen-name of Harold Silver, an American painter

== Other ==
- Micheline (railcar), a series of rubber-tyred trains developed in France in the 1930s
- Micheline (liqueur)
- "Micheline", a song by Sun Kil Moon from Benji (2014)

== See also ==
- Michelin (disambiguation)
