= Michelin (disambiguation) =

Michelin is a French tyre company. Michelin may also refer to:

== People ==
- Michelin (surname), surname

== Other ==
- Michelin Cup, aviation award
- Michelin Ground, cricket ground in Stoke-on-Trent, England
- Michelin Guide, restaurant guide
- Michelin House, building in London, England

== See also ==
- Micheline (disambiguation)
