= Édouard Michelin =

Édouard Michelin may refer to:

- Édouard Michelin (born 1859), French industrialist, one of the founders of the Michelin company
- Édouard Michelin (born 1963), his great-grandson, a former CEO and managing partner of the Michelin Group
