= VLV =

VLV may refer to:

- "Viva la Vida", song by Coldplay
- Viva la Vida or Death and All His Friends, album by Coldplay
- Viva Las Vengeance, album by Panic! at the Disco
- Voice of the Listener & Viewer, a British campaign group
- V-League Visayas, a Philippine regional collegiate volleyball league
- Christian Democratic Alliance (Fiji), political party whose Fijian name is Veitokani ni Lewenivanua Vakarisito
- Peugeot VLV, 1940s electric microcar
