= Marianne Durano =

French philosopher and essayist (born 1991)

Marianne Durano (born 10 July 1991 in Lyon) is a French essayist and philosopher, and member of the editorial board of the journal Limite.

== Biography ==
Durano is one of the French theorists of integral ecology, alongside Eugénie Bastié and Gaultier Bès. A graduate of Lyon and a graduate of philosophy, she is a part-time philosophy professor in a high school.

She has been married to Gaultier Bès since 2014; they have two children.

For Marianne Durano, we must come to an integral feminism, an egalitarian relationship in the couple. Also, she advocates "learn to love your body". Durano also has strong reservations against the contraceptive pill.

== Press ==
Durano is regularly interviewed in newspapers, such as: La Ville, Famille chrétienne, TéléObs, and Le Figaro.

She is also the guest of TV programs: "Tonight (or never!)" 11 March 2016 on the subject: "700 researchers around the world are alarmed by intelligent robots and advances in artificial intelligence ... Should we stop everything?"; 28 minutes on 22 September 2017 on Arte about the politics of the French president, Hello Terrans! on 3 February 2018 on the subject of Assisted reproductive technology and Surrogacy, Vraiment Politique sur Le Média on 8 March 2018, and radio programs on:Sud Radio; .and Radio Notre-Dame.

== Works ==
- Gaultier Bès, Marianne Durano et Axel Nørgaard Rokvam, Nos limites : pour une écologie intégrale, Paris, Éditions du Centurion, 2014, 110 p. ISBN 979-10-92801-12-5
- Marianne Durano, Mon Corps ne vous appartient pas, Paris, Albin Michel, 2018, 304 p. ISBN 978-2-226-39618-1
