= Kléber =

Kléber or variants may refer to:

- Avenue Kléber, avenue in Paris, France
- French cruiser Kléber, French armored cruiser active from 1904 to 1917
- Kléber station, a Paris Metro station
- Kléber (train), former express train in France
- Lycée Kléber, secondary school in Strasbourg, France
- Place Kléber, central square of Strasbourg, France
- Kleber Tyre Company, a brand of tires owned by Michelin

== Persons with the given name ==
- Kléber (footballer, born 1980) (Kléber de Carvalho Corrêa), Brazilian footballer
- Kléber (footballer, born 1998) (born 1998), Brazilian footballer
- Kléber Giacomance de Souza Freitas (born 1983), Brazilian footballer
- Kléber Guerra (born 1970), Brazilian footballer
- Kléber Laube Pinheiro (born 1990), Brazilian footballer
- Kleber Mendonça Filho (born 1968), Brazilian film director, screenwriter and producer
- Klebber Toledo (born 1986), Brazilian actor

== Persons with the surname ==
- Claus Kleber (born 1955), German journalist
- Emilio Kléber, nom de guerre of Manfred Stern (1896–1954), Soviet spy and republican general during the Spanish Civil War
- Jean-Baptiste Kléber (1753–1800), French general
- João Kléber (born 1957), Brazilian comedian and TV presenter
- Maxi Kleber (born 1992), German basketball player

== See also ==
- Cléber (disambiguation)
