= Youth Council of the French Union =

The Youth Council of the French Union (French: Conseil de la jeunesse de l'Union française, abbreviated CJUF) was a coordinating body of youth organizations in the French Union. CJUF was founded in 1950. The organization had its headquarters in Paris and held annual congresses.

== Leadership ==
The foundation of CJUF was the work of three individuals; Rémy Montagne (chairman of ACJF, Catholic Action of French Youth), Jean Jousselin (chairman of CFMJ, French Council of Youth Movements, a Protestant youth organization) and Antoine Lawrence. Lawrence represented the Guinean Youth Council (founded in 1952). He was also a member of the CFDT trade union in Guinea. As of 1952, Rémy Montagne served as president of CJUF and Antoine Lawrence as its general secretary. As of 1957, the president of CJUF was Jacques Duquesne.

== Cooperation with WAY ==
CJUF received government support. Through CJUF the colonial authorities hoped to counter the anti-colonialist stream emerging amongst the youth and students movements in the colonies, but this endeavor had meagre results. CJUF was affiliated to the World Assembly of Youth (WAY), the pro-Western structure set up to counter the World Federation of Democratic Youth (WFDY). CJUF was dominated by religious organizations. The scout movement also participated in CJUF.

== Saint-Louis congress ==
In 1952 CJUF held its congress at the Lycée Faidherbe in the Senegalese town of Saint-Louis between July 25 and August 1, 1952. 65 delegates, representing Metropolitan France, French West Africa (32 delegates from 8 territories), French Equatorial Africa, Algeria, Indochina and Madagascar, took part in the congress. In that year youth councils had been set up across French West Africa by the colonial authorities. These councils were integrated into CJUF at the Saint-Louis congress. Soon thereafter, in August 1952, CJUF hosted a congress of the World Assembly of Youth at the Lycée Van Vollenhoven in Dakar.

== Revolt of West African youth councils ==
CJUF ran various activities regarding agricultural development, culture, literacy, hygiene, etc. in the African territories. But as anti-colonial feelings grew stronger, the pro-Western and moderate profile of WAY caused dissident amongst the African affiliates of CJUF. By the time of a CJUF congress in Yaoundé in August 1953, the Senegalese and Nigerien Youth Councils had resigned from CJUF. The following year the Soudanese Youth Council and the RDA Youth boycotted the WAY congress and sent delegates to the congress of WFDY in Peking instead. In July 1955 the youth councils of West Africa (except the Upper Volta Youth Council) met in Bamako and formed a new organization, the Federal Youth Council of French West Africa. This organization, later renamed the African Youth Council, would declare itself independent from CJUF, WAY and WFDY.

== Later period ==
The sixth congress of CJUF was held in Tananarive between August 3 and 11, 1955. Léopold Sédar Senghor, then a French government minister, chaired the congress. CJUF held its seventh congress in Besançon July 22 – July 29, 1956.

== Publication ==
CJUF published the tri-monthly journal Équipes nouvelles de l'Union française: Nouveaux horizons between May 1952 and 1957.
