= Micheline (given name) =

Micheline (/ˈmiːʃliːn/ MEESH-leen) is a feminine given name. Notable people with the name include:

- Micheline Beauchemin (1929–2009), Canadian textile artist and weaver
- Micheline Bernardini (born 1927), French dancer
- Micheline Borghs (born 1956), Belgian fencer
- Micheline Calmy-Rey (born 1945), Swiss politician
- Micheline Charest (1953-2004), Canadian television producer
- Micheline Dumont (historian) (born 1935), Canadian historian, lecturer, professor
- Micheline Ishay (born 1962), American political theorist
- Micheline Jacques (born 1971), French Barthélemois politician
- Micheline Lanctôt (born 1947), Canadian actress
- Micheline Lannoy (1925–2023), Belgian pair skater
- Micheline Aharonian Marcom (born 1968), American novelist
- Micheline Montreuil, Canadian lawyer and politician
- Micheline Okemba (fl. 1980), Congolese handball player
- Micheline Ombae, Congolese politician
- Micheline Ostermeyer (1922–2001), French athlete and concert pianist
- Micheline Patton (1912–2001), Irish actress
- Micheline Presle (1922–2024), French actress
- Micheline Coulombe Saint-Marcoux (1938–1985), Canadian composer
- Micheline (singer) (nl:Mich Van Hautem) (1968) Flemish singer, Micheline Van Hautem from Tadpole (film) soundtrack
