= Média-Participations =

French media concern

- Type: Private
- Industry: Publishing; Entertainment
- Founded: September 20, 1986; 40 years ago
- Founder: Rémy Montagne
- Headquarters: Paris, France
- Key people: Vincent Montagne (chairman); Claude de Saint Vincent (chief executive officer); Caroline Duvochel (managing director of Ellipse Animation)
- Revenue: €302 million (2007)
- Number of employees: 900 (2009)
- Divisions: Dargaud; Dupuis; Microids
- Subsidiaries: Belvision; DreamWall; Ellipse Animation; Fleurus; Le Lombard; Mediatoon Distribution; Miyu Productions (25%); Studio Campedelli
- Website: www.media-participations.com

Média-Participations (French pronunciation: [medja paʁtisipasjɔ̃]) is a French publishing and media entertainment conglomerate that specialize in publishing comics, magazines, literature, audiovisual production and video game publishing. They have a strong presence in the comic book publishing and entertainment industries with a focus on publishing, entertainment production and game development. It was founded in September 1986 by former business lawyer and former politician Rémy Montagne and they own forty publishing houses in its portfolio, including Dupuis, Dargaud, Le Lombard, Fleurus, La Martinière, and Abrams.

The entertainment & publishing group comprises more than 65 publishing & audiovisual companies, with a turnover of €700 million in 2024.

== History ==
Média-Participations was created in 1986 by Rémy Montagne, a politician who had been a member of the French Parliament for three decades before starting in the publishing business. After his death in 1991, he was succeeded by his son Vincent. The company was first called Ampère and focused on the acquisition of a number of struggling Christian publishing houses like Fleurus. In 1986, the group changed its name to Média-Participations and focused more on Franco-Belgian comics, which started when they acquired Le Lombard in 1986 and Dargaud in 1988.

In June 1997, Média-Participations alongside its publishing house Dargaud announced that they've acquired French animation and production company Marina Productions which was founded by Claude Berthier expanding Dargaud's animation output and Média-Participations' production activities with Marina Productions being placed under Dargaud's film & television production division Dargaud Films thrus becoming Dargaud's own animation subsidiary within Dargaud Films.

At the start of September 2001, Média-Participations had brought Paris-based publishing company that specializing in historical and thematic works, Éditions Chronique (a publishing company founded in 1981 by Jacques Legrand), alongside its assets, with its unit being folded into Média-Participations' in-house publishing subsidiary Dargaud.

One year later in 2002, Média-Participations had acquired Storimages, an animation production studio formed in on 1 September 1995 by Odile Limousin and Sylvie Martin, the acquisition of Storimages had further increased Média-Participations' animation production portfolio with Storimages being placed under Dargaud's animation production unit Dargaud Marina while Storimages' co-founders Odile Limousin and Sylvie Martin continued leading the studio.

In July 2003, Média-Participations alongside their publishing house Dargaud announced they had acquired Paris-based French animation production studio Ellipsanime from its previous parent company Canal+ through their division StudioExpand, the acquisition of Ellipsanime gave both Média-Participations and its publishing house Dargaud another animation production studio with its publishing group Dargaud assuming all ownership of Ellipsanime's production activities with Ellipsanime's animated programming portfolio joining Dargaud's own largest animation production studio Dargaud Marina while Ellipsanime was placed under Dargaud Marina with their distribution division Dargaud Distribution taking over Ellipsanime's programming library and its future projects.

In late June 2004, Média-Participations' animation production activities were strengthened when they acquired Belgian publishing house and Dargaud & Le Lombard's former rival publisher Dupuis alongside their Belgian/French audiovisuel production division Dupuis Audiovisuel (now Dupuis Edition & Audiovisuel) and animation studio Belvision for €300 million, expanded both Média-Participations' publishing & animation production activities and reunited their publishing company Le Lombard with Dupuis. The acquisition also gave them two more animation production studios with Dupuis Audiovisual's distribution business being folded into Dargaud Distribution. In 2008 four years after Média-Participations failed a bid to acquire Editis, they renewed its bid on Editis, now for more than €1 billion.

The publisher is now the third largest publisher of France, and the major Franco-Belgian comics publisher. Of the 32 million books published a year, 20 million are comics. Magazine sales also reach 30 million copies a year. The group publishes around 600 publications a year, some 13% of the total number of Franco-Belgian comics, but these represent almost a third of the sales of comics in France.

On January 31, 2007, Média-Participations announced the launch of a management and distribution subsidiary dedicated to overseeing all of publishing and animation production activities called Mediatoon who will bring all of Média-Participations' publishing and production activities under one roof, Dargaud Distribution the distribution division of Dargaud's production outfit Dargaud Marina who distributed Média-Participation' animated production catalogues was moved from Dargaud Marina and was placed under the new subsidiary Mediatoon, giving them an international distribution division and had it renamed to Mediatoon Distribution with Marie-Pierre Moulinjeune leading the rebranded distribution division whilst continued handling distribution to Média-Participations' programming catalogue.

In August 2007, Média-Participations and its Belgian publishing company Dupuis had partnered with Belgian broadcasting network RTBF to form an in-house Belgian graphic & animation production studio called DreamWall, the new animation studio will be located in Marcinelle, Charleroi and would handle all of the animated television series produced by Média-Participations' animation studios including Dupuis Audiovisuel, Ellipsanime and Dargaud Media alongside outside studios starting with the television series Cedric with Dupuis holding a 51% in the new animation studio and RTBF holding a 49% in the new studio.

In February 2009, Média-Participations entered the video game publishing industry by acquiring a French computer software company, Anuman Interactive.

In September 2013, Média-Participations through its anime-home video label Kana Home Video had partnered with Viz Media Europe, The European division of American entertainment company & Japanese manga publisher Viz Media via Kaźe to promote Japanese anime for the European market by merging the former's website Genzai with the latter's own website K2Play into one anime SVOD platform entitled ADN (Anime Digital Network) which launched a month later in October of that year. American anime-streaming service Crunchyroll would take over ADN when it brought a majority stake in its parent Viz Media Europe five years later in December 2019, but three years later on July 27, 2022, Média-Participations acquired full ownership of the streaming service with the streaming service being rebranded to Animation Digital Network as it switched its focus from Japanese anime when Crunchyroll partered ways with the French streaming platform to focus on the latter's own streaming platforms.

In September 2017, the company entered exclusive discussions to acquire fellow French publishing company La Martinière Groupe the parent of its division Editions de La Martinière alongside its imprints including France's most famous prestigious literary imprints Editions du Seuil and American art & children's publishing inprint Abrams Books. Three months later in December of that year, the French government approved Média-Participations' planned acquisition of French publishing company La Martinière Group alongside its imprints such as famous publishing imprint Editions du Seuil and the group's American publishing imprint Abrams Books

One year later on May 29, 2018, Média-Participations expanded into the theme park operations with the launch of its theme park in Monteux entitled Parc Spirou Provence, the new theme park brings all the comic book characters from comic books such as Spirou and Marsupilami originally published by Média-Participations' Belgian publishing arm Dupuis under one theme park which was delayed from its original 2015 announcement.

In December 2019, following the departure of Média-Participations' previous CEO & president of its animation production companies and its Paris and Angoulême-based animation production studio Ellipse Studio, Maïa Tubiana, back in September of that year, Média-Participations had appointed Caroline Duvochel to be their new CEO of Média-Participations' animation production activities namely Dargaud Media, French/Belgian audiovisuel production company Dupuis Edition & Audiovisuel, Ellipsanime Productions and its Paris and Angoulême-based in-house animation production studio Ellipse Studio.

At the start of April 2020, Média-Participations appointed former Studio 100 Animation managing director & executive producer Katell France to lead its animation production group including Dargaud Media, Dupuis Edition & Audiovisuel, Ellipsanime Productions and Paris & Angoulême-based animation studio Ellipse Studio under the role of consuling producer for the group's programming state.

In May 2022, Média-Participations entered a stragic partnetship with French music streaming service Deezer to develop & produce new audio experience content based on Média-Participations' massive portfolik of comic book brands, books and characters into audiobooks and audio dramas with them taking an investment in the French music streaming platform Deezer.

In June 2022 during the annual Annecy International Animation Film Festival, Média-Participations announced that they were bringing all of their French animation production labels (which were Dargaud Media, French/Belgian audiovisuel production company Dupuis Edition & Audiovisuel, and Ellipsanime Productions) along with their Paris and Angoulême-based in-house animation production studio Ellipse Studio under one animation production umbrella group named Ellipse Animation with Média-Participations's animation production labels became part of the new production company alongside Paris and Angoulême-based in-house animation production studio Ellipse Studio became Ellipse Animation's new animation studio division.

In January 2026, Média-Participations extended its animation business by acquiring a 25% stake in Paris-based animation company Miyu Productions including its distribution arm Miyu Distribution and entered a partnership with them to produce projects for its anime streaming platform Animation Digital Network.

== Asset activities ==
=== Comics ===
Comics and manga are published by six different publishers: the general audience publishers of Franco-Belgian comics Dupuis, Dargaud and Le Lombard, the publisher of manga Kana, and the specialized publishers Lucky Comics (for Lucky Luke) and Blake et Mortimer.

=== Multimedia ===
Média-Participations' handles their animation studios and video game publishing companies.

==== Animation studios ====
The group's animation production group Ellipse Animation through its production companies produced three to five new animation series every year. Media-Participations's international distribution subsidiary Mediatoon Distribution handle the group's catalogue over 3,000 hours of animation.

- Belvision - A historical animation production studio based in Belgium produced its shows from the 1950s to the present day. They also co-produce shows that Ellipse Animation's production companies produced.
- DreamWall
- Ellipse Animation - An entertainment & animation production group that handles all of Média-Participations three main animation productions studios under one roof.
  - Dargaud Media
  - Dupuis Edition & Audiovisuel
  - Ellipsanime Productions - A Paris-based French animation production subsidiary of Ellipse Animation those Média-Participations fellow publishing unit Dargaud had acquired from its previous parent company Canal+ through StudioExpand; They acquired the library of the French television production company & animation studio MoonScoop S.A. in January 2014.
    - MadLab Animations - A Roubaulx-based animation joint-venture production studio between Ellipsanime Productions and independent game publishing & entertainment company Ankama Animations, that handles some of Ellipse Animations' shows such as Kid Lucky.
- Miyu Productions (25%)
- Studio Campedelli - An Italian animation production studio that was founded in 2008 by Pietro Campedelli.
- Mediatoon Distribution - The international distribution subsidiary of Média-Participations that handles distribution of all of Ellipse Animation's programming; the distribution subsidiary was originally known as Dargaud Distribution before merging it with Dupuis Audiovisuel's distribution arm Dupuis Distribution in 2004 before splitting from its previous parent Dargaud Media in January 2007.
- Storimages

===== DreamWall =====
DreamWall is a multimedia services and animation studio based in Charleroi, Belgium. Founded in 2004, it specializes in 2D, 3D, and hybrid animation for feature films and TV series. It is also known for producing virtual/augmented reality sets for media and broadcast events.

Before DreamWall was formed, Thibault Baras in 2005 had established and developed Belgium's first virtual reality production set for weather graphics & virtual production assets for news broadcasts, magazine programming & sports/live events for the broadcaster RTBF.

It was founded in August 2007, when Média-Participations' Belgian publishing unit Dupuis increased its animation production activities when they partnered with Belgian broadcasting network RTBF to form an in-house Belgian graphic & animation production studio based in Marcinelle, Charleroi, called DreamWall, with Dupuis holding a 51% stake and RTBF holding a 49% stake in the new studio & would handle all animation services for all of the animated television series produced by Ellipse Animation's labels Dupuis Edition & Audiovisuel, Dargaud Media and Ellipsanime Productions, including animated series produced by outside studios while Thibault Baras became DreamWall's managing director.. When DreamWall was established it was originally temporary located at RTBF's headquarters at Reyers Tower in Schaerbeek, Brussels before it moved to its current headquarters right next to Dupuis' main in-house publishing headquarters in June 2008 and was remained there since.

At the start of April 2010, DreamWall had partnered with Dame Blanche, Victor Studio, FDP Production, and Virtualis to establish a new investment fund and tax shelter framework entitled Go West Invest.

In December 2010 following the launch of DreamWall three years ago in 2007 by Dupuis and RTBF, Dupuis and RTBF had collaborated with TéléSambre, and RTC Liège to jointly establish a new creative virtual production studio based in Dupuis & DreamWall's headquarters in Marcinelle entitled KeyWall, that would serve as a subsidiary of DreamWall. However 10 years later, DreamWall had acquired KeyWall and it suspentualy had it merged into the main animation production parent DreamWall under one single unit with DreamWall assuming KeyWall's virtual production assets and had it splitten into two departments which are DreamWall Media Solutions, the unit would handle set design, augmented reality and virtual studio production, video mapping, and the production of weather and traffic reports, and DreamWall Animation, that would handle all of animation production services for Ellipse Animation's films & televisiom serie programming like The Smurfs.

In April 2023, DreamWall had formed a partnership with Ottawa-based Canadian prominent live video production technology company Ross Video that would bring DreamWall's augmented reality (AR) design services with Ross Video's specialized rendering and control hardware as DreamWall would use Ross Video's Unreal Engine-based graphic rendering platform Voyager along with Ross Video's virtual production control platform Lucid Studio for DreamWall's AR & virtual studio productions while Ross' Rocket Surgery Creative Services team would work with DreamWall.

On June 6, 2025, during the 2025 MIFA Annecy, DreamWall have been appointed by The Peyo Company when its division Peyo Productions had announced that they colloaboarted with DreamWall and French/Canadian production company & animation studio Blue Spirit to produce two standalone special episodes based on the 2021 TV series The Smurfs, which DreamWall's fellow production studio Dupuis Edition & Audiovisuel had produced & DreamWall had previously handles animation services for it, with them had been confirmed to be in production and set to premiere in 2026.

==== Mediatoon Distribution ====
Mediatoon Distribution, formerly known as Dargaud Distribution, is the French international distribution and IP managing subsidiary of Média-Participations that handles distribution of catalog of over 10,000 half-hours of programming produced by the Ellipse Animation production group, It's merchandising & brand development agency division Mediatoon Licensing, has specializing in licensing, merchandising, publishing, and audiovisual rights to a portfolio of comics published by the group's publishing companies such as Dargaud, Dupuis and Le Lombard.

In June 2004, Dargaud Distribution had folded Dupuis Audiovisuel's distribution division Dupuis Distribution into the distribution arm when Dargaud Distribution's parent Média Participations had brought rival publishing company Dupuis alongside its production arm Dupuis Audiovisuel and its production library with Dargaud Distribution started handling distribution to Dupuis Audiovisuel's catalogue and would handle distribute the latter's future series.

On December 22, 2008, Mediatoon under its interactive division Mediatoon Interactive announced the launch of the online channel that bring all of the productions originally produced by Média-Participations' fellow animation production studios which were - Dargaud Media, Dupuis Audiovisuel, Ellipsanime Productions and Storimages - under one brand named eToon to bring all of the group's programming library as well as series produced by indie studios on VOD and SVOD platforms.

In October 2009 during MIPCOM Jr. in that year, Mediatoon Distribution had appointed its head of international sales, Jérôme Alby, to becomes its new deputy general manager while he continued to oversee international sales, Mediatoon Distribution furthermore had appointed Jessica Delahaie had been appointed as sales executive for EMEA.

In April 2021, Mediatoon Distribution's licensing & IP management division, Mediatoon Licensing, partnered with Belgian entertainment company Studio 100 via its German distribution division Studio 100 Media to represent Mediatoon's franchises mainly from Mediatoon Distribution's programming catalogue and publishing catalogues of both Dupuis and Dargaud such as Lucky Luke to the German-speaking territories and other Central Europe territories to expand its international presence.

In June 2024, Mediatoon Distributed strengthened its long-running distribution partnership with Bayard Animation to handle international global distribution sales to Bayard Animation's upcoming programming including the second season of Bayard Animation's preschool television series Zouk.

==== Animation Digital Network ====
Animation Digital Network (also known as ADN), formerly known as Anime Digital Network, is Média-Participations' French streaming service that is dedicated to legal, high-definition anime, manga, and animation content that was formed from the merger of two anime-focused streaming platforms Genzai and KZPlay in October 2013. It offers a wide catalog of Japanese anime simulcasting, as well as European and Asian animations, available in its original Japanese language and French-subtitled/dubbed versions.

The streaming service launches when Média-Participations under its anime-focus home video label Kana Home Video partnered with Viz Media's European publishing & entertainment division Viz Media Europe through Kazé to merge Kana's streaming platform Genzai with Kazé's own platform KZ Play to form one anime-focused streaming service.

In July 2021, Anime Digital Network signed a deal with Indian media technology company Amagi to handle distribution for ADN's French anime channel to Samsung TV Plus as ADN would use Amagi's cloud live platform for live broadcasting.

=== Magazines ===
- Spirou, published by Dupuis
- Famille chrétienne, published by Edifa
- different magazines by Rustica, including Système D

=== Books ===
- Editions Chronique for thematic publications
- Le Ballon for children's books
- Fleurus for a wide variety of books, including many children's books
- La Martinière Groupe

=== VideoGames ===
- Syberia Series (as. Syberia, Syberia II and Syberia III is in development.) by: Microïds an Anuman software brand.
- Still Life series (as. Post Mortem, Still Life and Still Life 2) by: Microïds
- Dracula Series
