= Cléber =

Cléber is a masculine given name, common in Brazil.

People with the name, several known as "Cléber", include:

- Cléber Guedes de Lima (born 1974), Brazilian footballer
- Cléber (footballer, born March 1982), Cléber Ferreira Manttuy, Brazilian football defender
- Cléber (footballer, born August 1982), Cléber Luis Alberti, Brazilian football goalkeeper
- Cléber (footballer, born 1990), Cléber Janderson Pereira Reis (born 1990), Brazilian footballer
- Cléber Nascimento da Silva (born 1986), Brazilian footballer
- Cléber Nelson de Andrade Raphaelli, also known as Cléber Gaúcho (born 1974), Brazilian footballer
- Cléber Resende de Oliveira (born 1979), Brazilian footballer
- Cléber Américo da Conceição (born 1969), Brazilian footballer
- Cléber Monteiro (born 1980), Brazilian footballer
- Cléber Santana (born 1981), Brazilian footballer
- Cléber Schwenck Tiene (born 1979), Brazilian footballer

== See also ==
- Kléber (disambiguation)
