= Michel Rollier =

French businessman

- Born: 19 September 1944 (age 81); Annecy, France
- Education: Sciences Po
- Occupation: CEO of Michelin (2006-2012)
- Successor: Jean-Dominique Senard

Michel Rollier (born 19 September 1944 in Annecy, Haute-Savoie, France) is a French industrialist in the automobile industry. On 26 May 2006, he succeeded his deceased cousin Édouard Michelin (the second), as chief executive officer of the Michelin tire company. In May 2012 Rollier was replaced by Jean-Dominique Senard and remained a board member until 2021.

Although not a descendant of Édouard Michelin (the elder and founder of the Michelin company), Michel Rollier is the uncle of Édouard Michelin who drowned during a fishing trip in May 2006. Michel Rollier is a son of François Rollier, a long time executive and finally CEO of Michelin from 1971 to 1974. He is the brother of Philippe Rollier, former CEO of Lafarge North America. Their family originates from Savoie, and contributed to the addition of the region of Savoie to France in 1860.
