= Pierre Michelin =

Pierre Michelin is a name. People with that name include:

- Pierre Michelin (1903–1937), French businessman
- Pierre Michelin (born 1937), French footballer
