= La Martinière Groupe =

French publishing company

- Parent company: Média-Participations
- Founded: 1994
- Country of origin: France
- Publication types: Books
- Imprints: Éditions du Seuil, Abrams Books
- Official website: www.lamartinieregroupe.com

La Martinière Groupe (French pronunciation: [la maʁtinjɛʁ ɡʁup]) is a French publishing house. It was formed in 1994. Subsidiaries include France's Éditions du Seuil and the United States' Abrams Books. In 2018, La Martinière was acquired by Média-Participations.

== See also ==
- Books in France
