= Pierre-Jules Boulanger =

French engineer (1885–1950)

- Born: 10 March 1885; Sin-le-Noble, France
- Died: 12 November 1950 (aged 65); Broût-Vernet, Allier
- Cause of death: Car accident
- Occupation: Engineer

Pierre-Jules Boulanger, often known simply as Pierre Boulanger (10 March 1885 – 12 November 1950), was a French engineer and businessman. He directed Citroën as a vice-president and as chairman from 1935 until his 1950 death in a car accident. He was known to colleagues as PJB.

== Biography ==
Boulanger was born in Sin-le-Noble Hauts-de-France. He studied fine art, but gave it up so that he could work. He worked in the French military service from 1906 to 1908. He met Marcel Michelin (nephew of Édouard Michelin). After military service, he went to the United States where he undertook various trades. He returned to France in 1914 and was mobilized as corporal, becoming an aerial photographer. He performed well in the service and finished the war with the rank of captain, decorated with the Military Cross and the Legion of Honour.

He is buried in the cemetery of Lempdes (Puy-de-Dôme), near Clermont-Ferrand, where he had his house.

=== Michelin ===
Boulanger started working for Michelin in 1918, reporting directly to Édouard Michelin, co-director and founder of the business. Boulanger joined the Michelin board in 1922, and in 1938, he became the company's joint managing director.

In December 1934, despite the assistance of the Michelin company, Citroën filed for bankruptcy. In December 1934, Michelin, already the car manufacturer's largest creditor, became its principal shareholder. Boulanger became the assistant of Pierre Michelin, who was the chairman of Citroën. Pierre Boulanger became the vice-president and chief of the Engineering and Design department. He became president in 1937 after the death of his friend and kept his position until his death. He also jointly managed the Michelin company.

As part of the policy to reduce costs, wages were decreased and the launching of the 22 V8 was cancelled. The policy bore fruit and Citroën recovered.

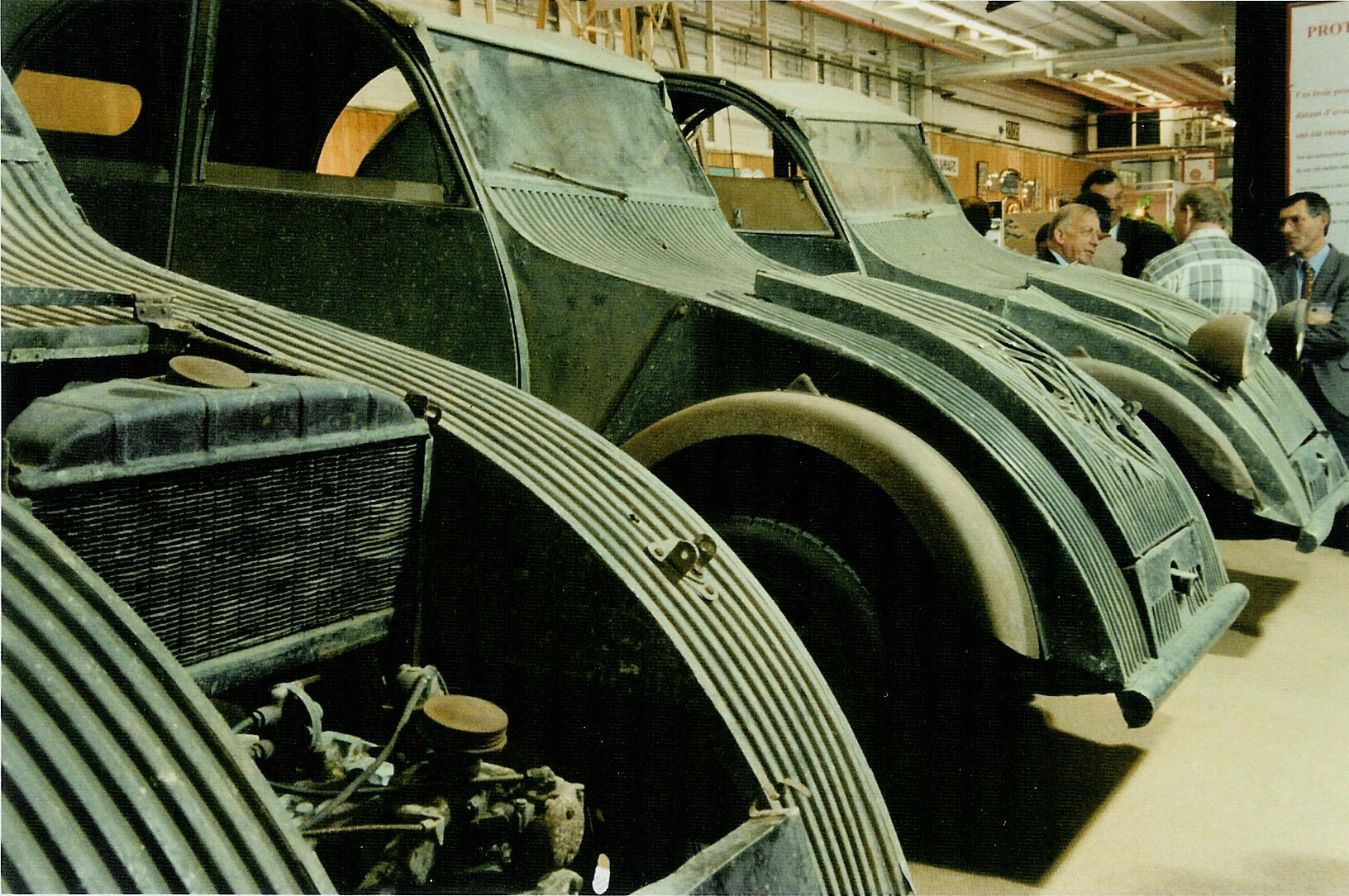
Pre-1939 prototypes for 2CV.

=== Second World War ===
During the occupation of France in the Second World War, Boulanger refused to meet Dr. Ferdinand Porsche or communicate with the German authorities except through intermediaries. He organized a 'go slow' of production of trucks for the Wehrmacht, many of which were sabotaged at the factory, by putting the notch on the oil dipstick in the wrong place resulting in engine seizure. In 1944 when the Gestapo headquarters in Paris was sacked by members of the French Resistance, his name was prominent on a German blacklist of the most important 'Enemies of the Reich' to be arrested in the event of an allied invasion of France.

=== TPV becomes 2CV ===
In 1936, Boulanger initiated a project to create the TPV (short for 'Très Petite Voiture' meaning 'very small car'), which became 2CV in 1948. His specification for the new model was characteristic of the man:

... create a car that can carry four people and 50 kg of potatoes at 60 km/h, while consuming just 3 litres of fuel per 100 km... it should be drivable by a woman or by a learner-driver ... and don't worry about how it looks.

The 2CV was known for its great capacity of work and its absence of ostentation.

In 1947, the Citroën H Van was introduced – this utilitarian commercial van was sold until 1981.

He died at Broût-Vernet, Allier, in a car crash in a Citroën Traction Avant on Sunday, 12 November 1950, on the main road between Clermont-Ferrand (the home of Michelin) and Paris.
