= Jean-Dominique Senard =

French businessman

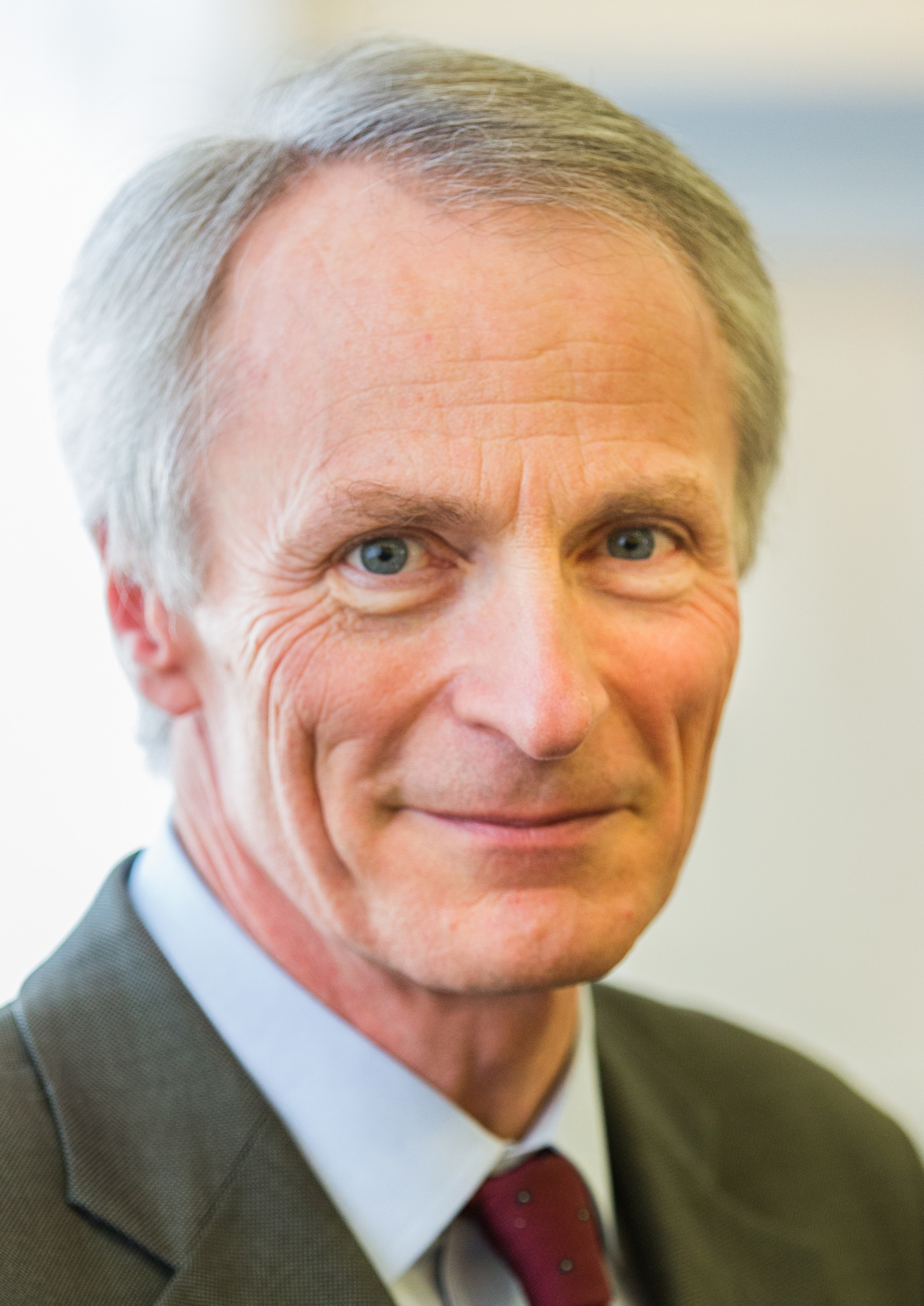
- Jean-Dominique Senard, in 2015.
- Born: 7 March 1953 (age 73); Neuilly-sur-Seine, France
- Education: HEC Paris
- Occupations: CEO, Michelin (2012–2019); Chairman, Renault (2019–present)

Jean-Dominique Senard (born 7 March 1953) is a French industrialist in the automobile industry. On 11 May 2012, he succeeded Michel Rollier as chief executive officer of the Michelin tire company after joining the company as chief financial officer in 2005. Senard is the first Michelin CEO not related to the Michelin family. On 24 January 2019, Renault's Board of Directors elected Senard as the chairman of the company.

== Early life ==
Senard is the son of a diplomat who grew up in numerous embassies around the world. His ancestor, Jules-Alexandre-Benjamin Senard (1848–1928) received the title of Hereditary Roman Count. As a child, Jean-Dominique Senard joined the choir known as Les Petits Chanteurs de Sainte-Croix de Neuilly, where he had a classical music training under the direction of Louis Prudhomme Senard. He attended the Hautes Etudes Commerciales (HEC) in Paris where he completed his education with an MA in law, before commencing his ascent through the ranks of France's leading corporates.

== Career ==
Senard started his career with various financial and operational management jobs at the oil company Total S.A. between 1979 and 1987. In 1987, he joined the management of the treasury of Saint-Gobain. In February 1988, he was appointed Deputy Director – then director in January 1991 – in cash and financing. He then moved to construction materials group Saint-Gobain where he remained for nine years before joining aluminium conglomerate Pechiney in 1996 as CFO and a member of its executive committee. When the mining firm Alcan launched a takeover bid for Pechiney in 2003, Senard was appointed chairman and became a member of Alcan's executive committee.

In March 2005, Senard joined Michelin as its CFO and executive council member. After the accidental drowning of his boss Édouard Michelin in 2006, he was appointed to managing partner of the group in May 2007. He then also was head of financial affairs, legal services, plans and results.

Michelin announced in November 2014 that Senard would continue as the managing general partner for the company following a meeting of the firm's board of directors on 6 October 2014. His term of office was renewed for four years and will expire in the first half of 2019, at the close of the annual shareholders’ meeting.

It bases its governance policy on several axes: responsible development and social dialogue to support the process of industrial change that characterizes its mandate, competitiveness of production and sales to meet the globalization of the economy, and valorisation of apprenticeship to attract young people to jobs that seem less attractive.

In 2017, under the leadership of Jean-Dominique Senard, Michelin announces a 43% increase in net income for 2016, to €1.7 billion.

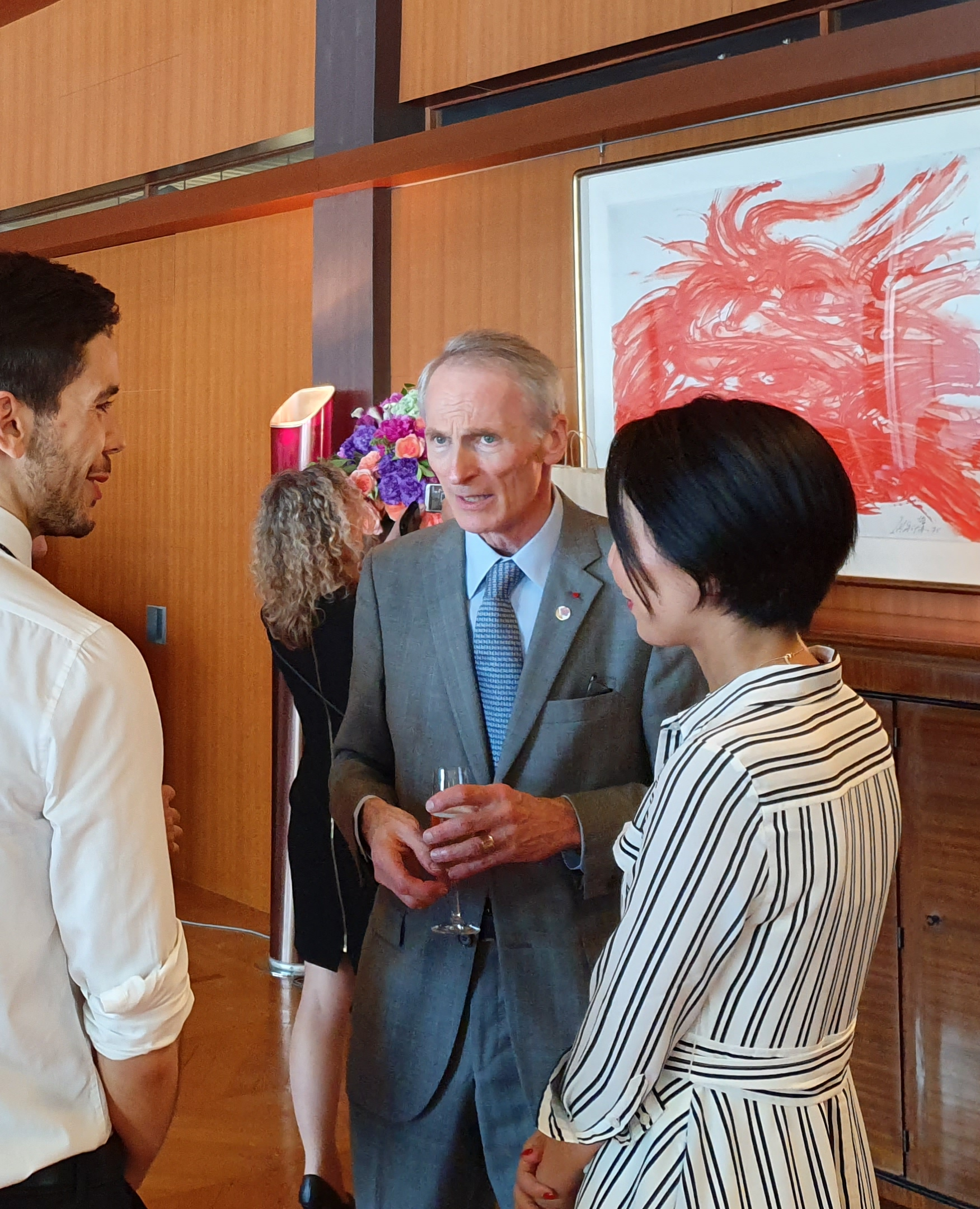
Jean-Dominique Senard in Japan before the 2019 G20 Osaka summit

On 24 January 2019, following Carlos Ghosn's resignation as President of Renault, Jean-Dominique Senard was named the new CEO of the Renault–Nissan–Mitsubishi Alliance. A decision welcomed by Bruno Le Maire, the French Minister of Economy, who believes that he will make "an excellent president for Renault".

== Other activities ==
=== Corporate boards ===
- Renault, chairman of the board of directors
- Saint Gobain SA, Independent Member of the board of directors (since 2012)
- Groupe SEB, Independent Member of the board of directors (2009–2013)

=== Non-profit organizations ===
- European Round Table of Industrialists (ERT), Member
- Institut Montaigne, Member of the Board of Directors

== Political positions ==
Senard is a vocal proponent of French president Emmanuel Macron.

== Honors and awards ==
Commander of the Order of Legion of Honour
