= Pierre Michelin (businessman) =

French businessman who was the head of the Michelin tyre company

- Born: August 12, 1903; France
- Died: December 30, 1937 (aged 34); Near Montargis
- Cause of death: Car accident
- Occupation(s): Businessman, Industrialist
- Known for: Joint head of the Michelin tyre company and the Citroën car company between 1933 and his early death at the end of 1937
- Father: Édouard Michelin (industrialist)
- Relatives: Étienne Michelin (Brother)
- Family: Michelin Family

Pierre Michelin (1903 - 1937) was a French businessman who was joint head of the Michelin tyre company between 1933 and his early death at the end of 1937, and president of the Citroën car company between September 1935 and 1937. He was part of the Michelin family and son of Édouard Michelin.

== Early life ==
Pierre Michelin was the younger of his father's two recorded sons.

== Career ==
He only became a director of the family company after 1932 following the death in a flying accident of his elder brother, Étienne Michelin. He was sent to Citroën car company in 1935.

Citroën had filed for bankruptcy in November 1934 when one of its creditors, a steering wheel supplier, applied to the court to enforce payment of a debt. As Citroën's supplier of tyres it was Michelin that was that company's largest creditor. In January 1935 André Citroën, already suffering from the cancer that would kill him a few months later, offered Michelin options to acquire a large block of voting shares in the business as additional security for the monies owed for tyres. With his father otherwise preoccupied, Pierre Michelin jumped at the opportunity, and by the end of January 1935 Michelin controlled more than 50% of the voting capital in Citroën.

Pierre Michelin became president of Citroën in July 1935 when André Citroën died, but by that time he was already running the company, cutting back on wasteful management practices and applying the type of detailed control already in place at the main Michelin plant in Clermont-Ferrand.

The immediate priority was the Citroën Traction Avant for which massive investment in production capacity had been necessary and which had been launched in April 1934 before all the gremlins in the design had been addressed in order to generate desperately needed revenue. Although the revolutionary unitary bodyshell was, according to most reports, not affected by the rushed launch schedule, problems with transmission joints and the hydraulic brakes – another "first" in a volume car in Europe – reflected the financial pressure to get the car into production as quickly as possible. Pierre Michelin's period at the head of the company saw the correction of early teething troubles on what became a successful and ultimately very profitable model for the company.

The Citroën acquisition which Pierre Michelin led marked the beginning of a defining partnership for both companies that would last for more than forty years.

In the political world there are persistent suspicions that Pierre Michelin had financial links with a cell of the neo-fascist Cagoule movement. France under the Popular Front government was undergoing a surge in nationalist extremism and industrial unrest at this time, but during the ensuing decades the suspicions involving Pierre Michelin never progressed beyond the status of rumor.

== Death ==
On 29 December 1937, while driving his Citroën Traction Avant near Montargis on the main road to the south, Pierre Michelin was involved in a fatal collision. The other car involved was a Peugeot, driven by Louis Lagorgette, the principal private secretary of the SFIO politician Paul Faure. Lagorgette, his wife and his son all died at the scene of the accident. Pierre Michelin died at the hospital in Montargis the next day, soon after undergoing an operation for the amputation of his right leg.

Pierre-Jules Boulanger was left to run Citroën without his friend, something he accomplished with flair and success for the next thirteen years. A sad parallel came in 1950 when Boulanger himself died at Broût-Vernet, Allier, also in a car crash in a Citroën Traction Avant, on Sunday, 12 November 1950, while on the main road between Clermont-Ferrand (the home of Michelin) and Paris.
