= Étienne Michelin =

French industrialist (1898–1932)

Étienne Michelin (4 January 1898 – 27 August 1932) was a French industrialist.

As the eldest son of Édouard Michelin (1859–1940), there was a strong likelihood that he would take over as head of the Michelin tyre company, where he worked as a member of the top management team. His early death ruled out this possibility, however.

== Life ==
Étienne Maurice Michelin was born at Clermont-Ferrand in central southern France. He was born nine years after the founding in the city, by his uncle and father, of the family tyre manufacturing business. In 1921 he married Madeleine Callies (1898-1936), the daughter of an industrialist from Savoy.

The Michelin family at this time were known for their active advocacy of aviation. A qualified test pilot, Étienne Michelin took off on the late afternoon of 27 August 1932 from the Aulnat Aerodrome at the controls of his 85 hp Morane mono-plane and headed towards the nearby Chaîne des Puys, a group of former volcanoes in the Massif Central. Caught up in a storm, he crashed at Saint-Genès-Champanelle a short distance from the Puy de Dôme (lava dome) and was killed in the accident. Press reports at the time suggested that, caught up in thick fog, he had misjudged his altitude. A stone cross marks the spot.

His widow died less than four years later: their orphaned son was brought up initially by his grandmother and, subsequently, by a deeply religious widowed aunt at Annecy.
