= Kleber Tyre Company =

French tire company owned by the Michelin Group

Kleber
- Type: Subsidiary
- Industry: Tyre manufacturing
- Founded: 1910; 116 years ago
- Founder: BF Goodrich (French subsidiary)
- Headquarters: Paris, France
- Parent: Michelin Group
- Website: kleber-tyres.com

Kleber is a French tyre company owned by the Michelin Group. It produces tyres for passenger vehicles, SUVs, and agricultural machinery.

== History ==
Kleber was founded in 1910 as Société Française B.F. Goodrich, a French subsidiary of the American tyre manufacturer BF Goodrich.

In 1945, the company moved its headquarters to Avenue Kléber in Paris and adopted the name Kléber-Colombes. In 1951, Kleber introduced the first tyre with an integral inner tube.

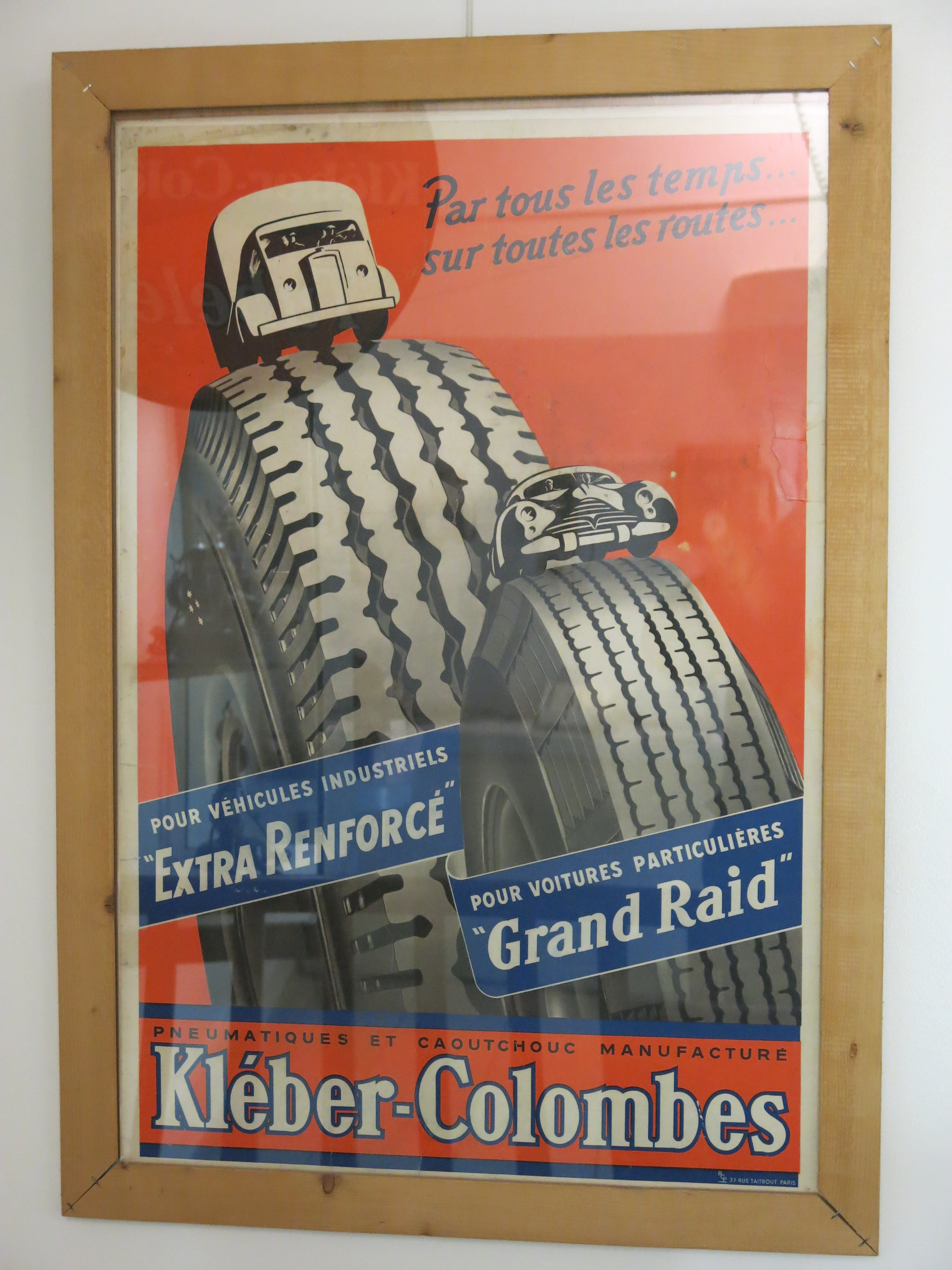
Kléber-Colombes advertisement

The company was acquired by Michelin in 1981.

In 1981, Kleber tyres were notably used by rally driver Michèle Mouton, who finished runner-up in the 1981 World Rally Championship.

In 2024 Kleber promoted a new role in sustainability and rural development with a partnership with French agricultural cooperatives to promote eco-friendly farming practices. That same year Kleber become involved in Michelin's circular economy initiatives, including tyre recycling and the use of bio-based materials. In 2025 the company launched promotional campaigns across the UK and Ireland for its agricultural range, emphasizing durability and fuel efficiency.

== Market Position ==
Kleber occupies a mid-range position in the European tyre market. It is particularly popular in France, Portugal, Spain, and the United Kingdom. Kleber tires are used as original equipment by manufacturers such as Peugeot, Renault and Volkswagen.

== Products ==
Kleber manufactures a range of tyres for various vehicle types and conditions:

- Summer tyres: Dynaxer HP4, Dynaxer HP5
- All-season tyres: Quadraxer 2, Quadraxer 3, Quadraxer SUV
- Winter tyres: Krisalp HP3
- Agricultural tyres: Traker, Topker, Gripker, Fitker, Super Vigne

== Agricultural Segment ==
Kleber is a major player in the agricultural tyre sector. Its products are designed for tractors, telehandlers, and crop sprayers.
