= Micheline (liqueur) =

French liqueur

modern bottle of La Micheline

Micheline, branded as La Micheline, is a French liqueur made in Carcassonne and created by Michel Sabatier in 1856. Sabatier, who was also creator of an aperitif called L'Or-Kina, claimed in his advertising that the liqueur came from a traditional recipe traced back to a Michelin Boato in the Fourth Century.
