= Famille chrétienne =

French Roman Catholic weekly magazine published in France since 1978

- Categories: Roman Catholicism
- Frequency: Weekly
- First issue: January 1978
- Company: Média-Participations
- Language: English
- Website: www.famillechretienne.fr

Famille chrétienne (French pronunciation: [famij kʁetjɛn]) is a French Roman Catholic weekly magazine published in France since 1978.

== History ==
The magazine was started in January 1978, as the sister publication of Famiglia Cristiana, an Italian Catholic magazine.

In 1981, the magazine was acquired by Rémy Montagne. In 1992, it was merged with Média-Participations.

In 2008, it had a circulation of 63,000.

== Content ==
The magazine covers national and international news, individual faith, and Catholic news. Its editorial stance is conservative.
