= Micheline Ishay =

American political theorist

Micheline R. Ishay
- Education: Ph.D. in Political Science and International Studies, Rutgers University (1992)
- Occupation: Political theorist
- Employer: University of Denver
- Notable work: The History of Human Rights, The Human Rights Reader, The Levant Express
- Title: Professor of International Studies and Human Rights, Director of the International Human Rights Program
- Term: 1992–2010, 2019–present
- Awards: the University of Denver Distinguished Scholar (2008)

Micheline R. Ishay is an American political theorist known for her work in international relations and the history of human rights. She is professor of international studies and human rights at the Josef Korbel School of International Studies at the University of Denver, where she serves as director of the International Human Rights Program (1992–2010, 2019–present) and was executive director of the Center on Rights Development (1993-2011). In 2008, she was named the University of Denver Distinguished Scholar, and she is an affiliate faculty member with the Center for Middle East Studies.

== Career ==
Ishay received a Ph.D. in political science and international studies from Rutgers University (1992). She was a fellow at the Center for Critical Culture and Contemporary Analysis, Rutgers University (1987–88); assistant professor at Hobart and William Smith Colleges (1990-1992); senior fellow at the Center for Democracy Collaborative, University of Maryland (2004); Lady Davis Visiting Professor, Hebrew University (2006); and visiting professor, Khalifa University, Abu Dhabi, United Arab Emirates (2010-2012, and spring 2013). She was resident fellow at the Bellagio Center, Rockefeller Foundation, Italy, fall 2015.

Ishay contributes to international forums in Europe and the Middle East and lectures on international issues in the U.S. In 2014, she was part of a "high level meeting of experts concerning the future of human rights and the international criminal justice system" in Siracusa, Italy. In 2010, she joined Jurgen Habermas, Claus Offe, and several other intellectuals in endorsing Antanas Mockus as the Green Party candidate for president in Colombia.

== Books ==
- The Levant Express: The Arab Uprisings and the Future of the Middle East. New Haven: Yale University Press, 2019.
- The Human Rights Reader: Major Political Essays, Speeches and Documents from Ancient Times to the Present. New York: Routledge Press, 2003. Second edition, 2008. Third edition, 2022.
- The History of Human Rights, from Ancient Times to the Globalization Era. Berkeley, CA: The University of California Press, 2004. Second edition, 2008.
- The Nationalism Reader (edited with Omar Dahbour). Atlantic Highlands, NJ: Humanities Press International, 1995. Reprinted by Prometheus Press, 1999.
- Internationalism and Its Betrayal. Minneapolis: University of Minnesota Press, 1995.
