= André Michelin =

French industrialist (1853–1931)

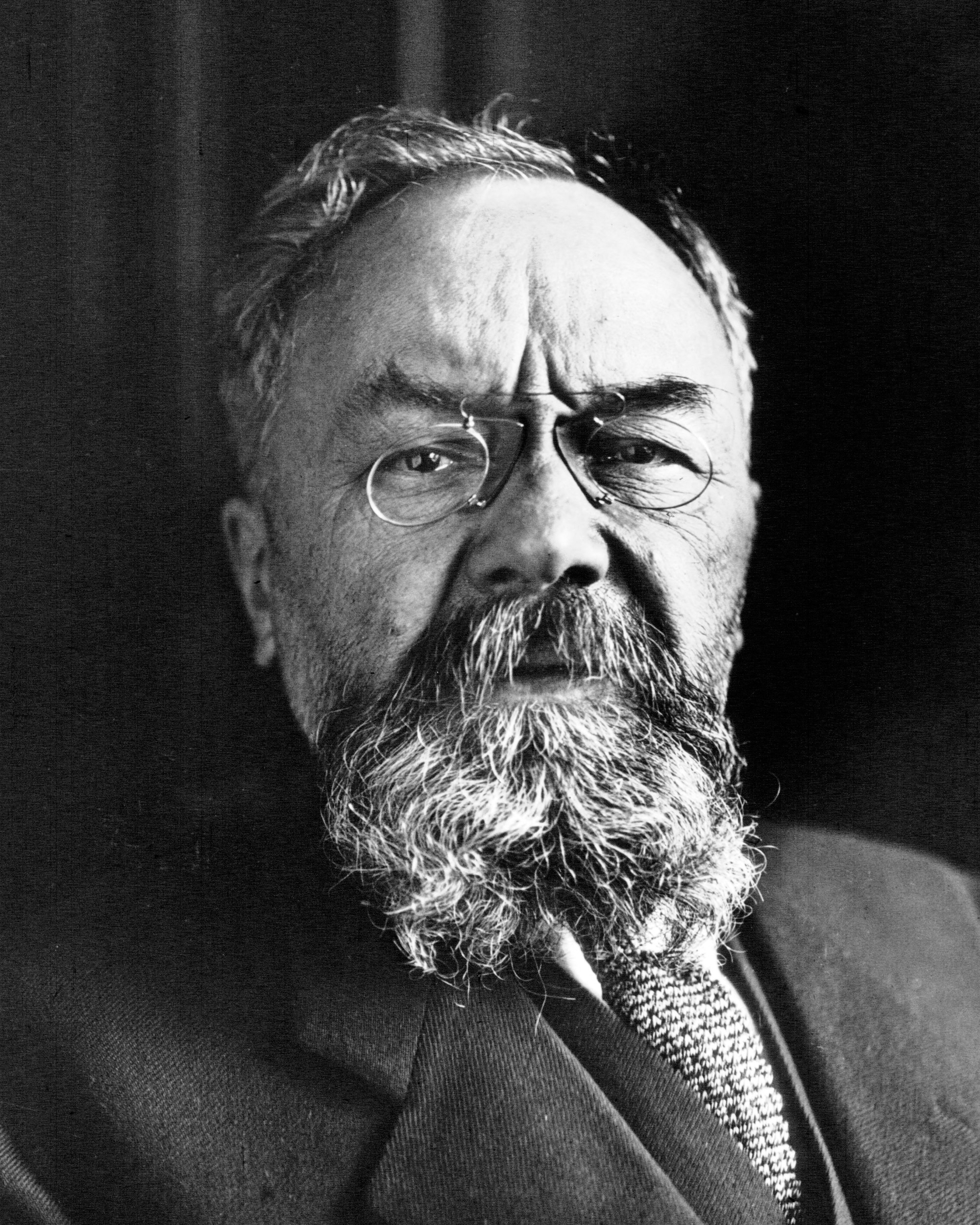
- André Michelin in 1920
- Born: André Jules Aristide Michelin; 16 January 1853; Paris, France
- Died: 4 April 1931 (aged 78); Paris, France
- Education: Lycée Louis-le-Grand
- Alma mater: École Centrale Paris
- Occupation: Industrialist
- Known for: Founder of Michelin
- Relatives: Édouard Michelin (Brother)

André Jules Aristide Michelin (16 January 1853 – 4 April 1931) was a French industrialist who, with his brother Édouard (1859–1940), founded the Michelin Tyre Company (Compagnie Générale des Établissements Michelin) in 1888 in the French city of Clermont-Ferrand.

In 1900, André Michelin published the first Michelin Guide, the purpose of which was to promote tourism by car, thereby supporting his tyre manufacturing operation.

== Career ==
In 1886, 33-year-old André Michelin abandoned his career as a successful Parisian engineer to take over his grandfather's failing agricultural goods and farm equipment business. Established in 1832, "Michelin et Cie" suffered from neglect and was on the verge of insolvency following the founder's death. Michelin's grandfather had started the company that sold farm equipment and an odd assortment of vulcanized rubber products, such as belts, valves and pipes. As soon as André took the helm of the company, he recruited his younger brother Édouard to join him at the company. Édouard was named the company's managing director. While duly committed to the success of the business, neither brother had any prior experience selling goods or had the slightest idea where to even begin.

In 1889, a cyclist familiar with the Michelin Company approached Édouard with his flat tyre seeking assistance. Getting a flat tyre frequently meant cyclists were left stranded for hours. In the late 1880s, cycling was becoming a popular form of transportation and hobby due in large part to John Dunlop's 1888 patent for the inflatable bicycle tyre. Before Dunlop's invention, bicycle tyres were made out of solid rubber. The solid rubber tyres tended to provide little traction and made for a difficult and uncomfortable ride.

After the hapless cyclist approached the Michelin Company for assistance, Édouard took great interest in the new pneumatic tyres. The Michelins recognized that there would be a great demand for pneumatic tyres if only there was a way to more quickly make repairs. They reasoned that first the wheel must become detachable. Édouard conducted a series of experiments and developed a number of prototypes. In 1891, he was granted a patent for a detachable tire.

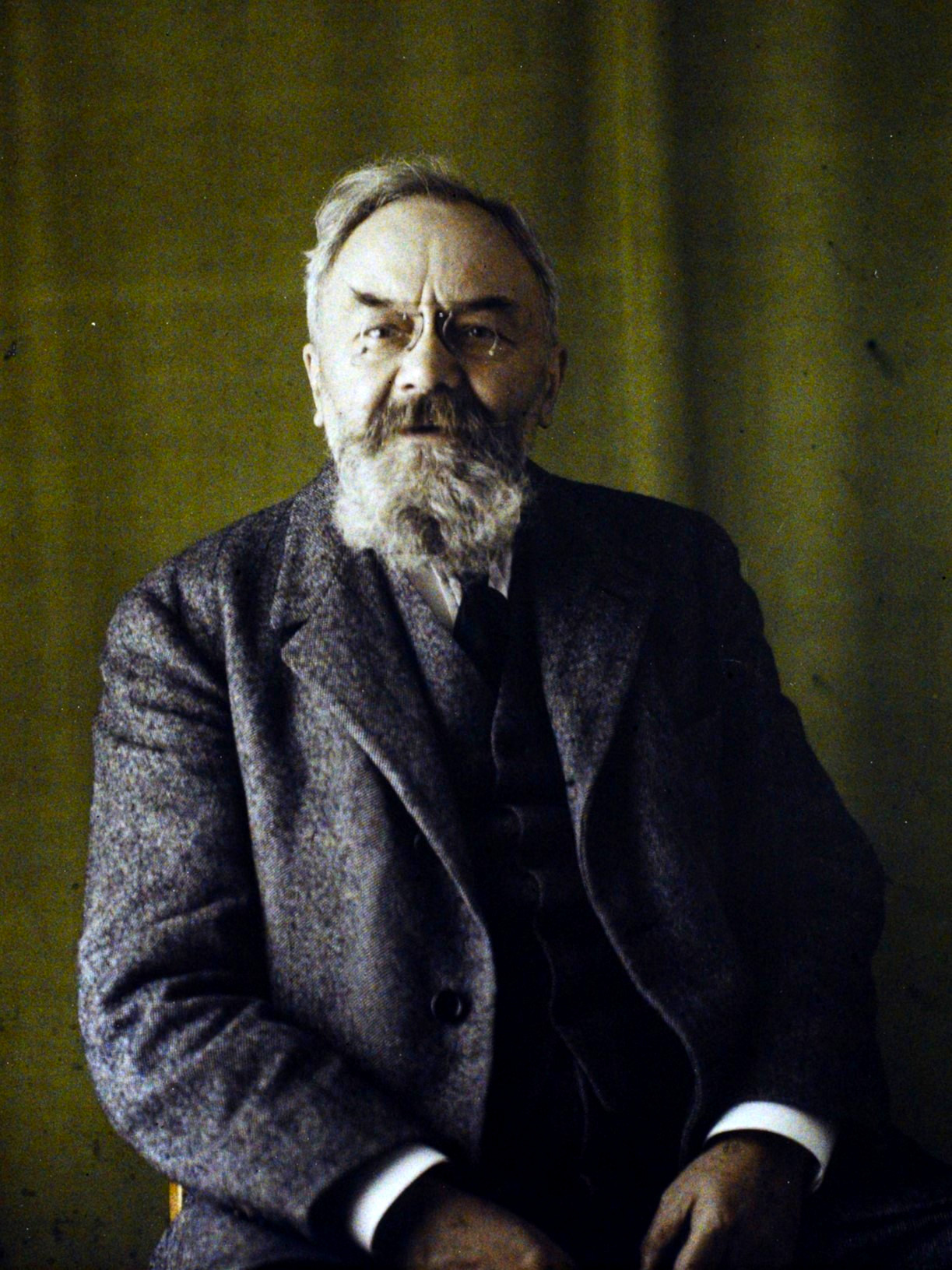
1924 Autochrome by Georges Chevalier

== Legacy ==
André and his brother Édouard were inducted into the Automotive Hall of Fame in Dearborn, Michigan in 2002.
