= Édouard Michelin (born 1963) =

French manufacturer (1963–2006)

- Born: 13 August 1963; Clermont-Ferrand, France
- Died: 26 May 2006 (aged 42); Île de Sein, France
- Education: Lycée Sainte-Geneviève
- Alma mater: École Centrale Paris
- Occupations: Industrialist, CEO of Michelin 1999–2006
- Parent(s): François Michelin; Bernadette Montagne

Édouard Michelin (French pronunciation: [edwaʁ miʃlɛ̃]; August 13, 1963 – May 26, 2006) was managing partner and co-chief executive of the Michelin Group. He was the great-grandson of Édouard Michelin (1859–1940), a co-founder of the company.

== Career ==
He was born in Clermont-Ferrand; after first studying at Ecole Massillon in Clermont-Ferrand, he entered the Lycée Sainte-Geneviève in Versailles. He also spent almost a full year studying at Christ Church Episcopal School in Greenville, South Carolina. It is there that he gained fluency in English. (Michelin has its North American headquarters in Greenville, and he lived with his relatives who were executives at Michelin in Greenville at the time.)

An engineering graduate of the École Centrale de Paris, he joined the Michelin Group, which was then headed by his father, François Michelin, in 1985. He initially worked at the lower levels of the company, including a stint on an assembly line. In 1987–1988 he completed his military service on French nuclear submarines.

When he returned to the company in 1989 he was first appointed production manager at Le Puy-en-Velay (France) plant, then team manager at Montceau-les-Mines. He was appointed CEO of Michelin North America, in charge of both industrial plant and truck UOT sales and distribution, under the leadership of Carlos Ghosn, a future Renault Nissan CEO.

In 1993, he joined François Michelin and René Zingraff in Clermont-Ferrand as Managing Partner of Michelin. One of his first challenges was implementing a plan to lay off 7500 employees. Despite criticism, he emerged with his reputation intact, especially after he supported the French government's proposal for a 35-hour workweek. He later launched a reorganization whereby Michelin plants would specialize rather than all producing a wide range of products. In 1998 he launched an initiative to encourage the development of environmentally friendly vehicles. One of his successes was in his decision to re-involve the company in Formula One racing. The company returned to F1 competition in 2001 and was immediately competitive. Success culminated in back-to-back World Championship successes in 2005 and 2006 with the Renault team and Fernando Alonso. The company withdrew from F1 following these successes as F1 reverted to a single-tyre supplier rule. Among Edouard's business failures was a proposal in 2004 to market the Michelin brand without its most recognized mascot, the "Michelin Man" (Bibendum). However stockholders voted against this idea.

He was appointed Michelin Group CEO at the Annual Shareholders Meeting on 11 June 1999, 110 years after the establishment of the company.

== Personal life ==
In 1992 he was married to his wife Cécile in a ceremony at Chartres Cathedral presided over by his elder brother, Father Etienne Michelin. He was the father of six children. Fond of theology, Gregorian chants, and mountain walks, he was a member of the World Business Council for Sustainable Development (WBCSD). In April 2005, he was elected to the board of directors of Nokia Corporation at the company's Annual General Meeting. In France, he was given two nicknames by his employees: "Dudu", because of his kindness, and "L'americain", due to his overseas experience.

Édouard Michelin died by drowning, while fishing in the Raz de Sein, near the island of Sein, off the coast of Finistère in northwest France, on 26 May 2006. The skipper of the boat, Guillaume Normant, also died in the accident. In honor of Michelin, the Formula One drivers forwent the usual champagne shower at the award ceremony in the following race in 2006 Monaco Grand Prix.

After his death, Michelin announced that co-managing partner Michel Rollier would head up the company. He is buried in the Orcines cemetery (Puy-de-Dôme).
