= Édouard Michelin (industrialist) =

French industrialist (1858–1940)

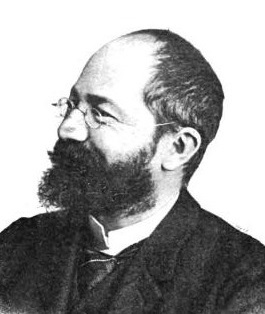
- Born: Édouard Etienne Michelin; 23 June 1859; Clermont-Ferrand, France
- Died: 25 August 1940 (aged 81); Orcines, France
- Occupation: Industrialist
- Children: Étienne Michelin (son); Pierre Michelin (son)
- Relatives: André Michelin (brother)

Édouard Michelin (French pronunciation: [edwaʁ miʃlɛ̃]; 23 June 1859 – 25 August 1940) was a French industrialist. He was born in Clermont-Ferrand, France. Édouard and his elder brother André served as co-directors of the Michelin company.

Edouard seemed destined for a career as an artist, but around 1888 he and his brother Andre returned to Clermont-Ferrand in order to try to save the failing family business, then a manufacturer of agricultural tools, drive belts and hoses. In 1889, he improved greatly on the design of the pneumatic tyre for bicycles, making tyres easier to change and repair. The invention proved its worth in the Paris–Brest cycle event organized by the newspaper Le Petit Journal in September 1891, and Michelin quickly adapted his inflatable tyres for use on motor vehicles, of which France was becoming the world's leading producer. Success came rapidly, and already in 1896 approximately 300 Paris taxis were running on Michelin pneumatic tyres. His company went on to experience tremendous growth serving the fledgling industry around the turn of the century and beyond.

In the traumatic weeks that followed the German invasion of May/June 1940, world events overshadowed Michelin's death. Nevertheless, by the time he died he had built Michelin into a major industrial force, with many "firsts" in wheel and tyre technology to its credit. He had overseen the acquisition of the (then bankrupt) Citroën business in 1934: with his son Pierre and their friend Pierre-Jules Boulanger he secured its position as one of Europe's most innovative auto-makers in the 1940s and 1950s, producing models such as the Citroën Traction, the revolutionary Citroën TUB/TUC light van and the 2CV prepared for introduction at the 1939 Paris Motor Show (which was cancelled at short notice, the war causing the launch of the little car to be deferred).

Édouard Michelin also lived a long life and suffered the personal tragedies of being predeceased by two of his sons, Étienne Michelin having been killed in a flying accident in 1932 and Pierre Michelin having been killed in a road accident near Montargis in 1937.

His great-grandson, a former CEO and managing partner of the Michelin Group who died on 26 May 2006 in a boating accident, was also named Édouard.

Édouard and his brother André were inducted into the Automotive Hall of Fame in Dearborn, Michigan, in 2002.
