= Rémy Montagne =

French lawyer, politician, and media proprietor

- Born: 9 January 1917; Mirabeau, Vaucluse, France
- Died: 10 January 1991 (aged 74); Louviers, Eure, France
- Occupations: Lawyer, politician, media proprietor
- Political party: Union for French Democracy
- Spouse: Geneviève Michelin
- Children: 7, including Vincent Montagne
- Relatives: Martial Montagne (brother); François Michelin (brother-in-law)

Rémy Montagne (French: [ʁemi mɔ̃taɲ]; 9 January 1917 – 10 January 1991) was a French lawyer, politician and media proprietor. He was a member of the National Assembly from 1958 to 1980.

== Early life ==
Rémy Montagne was born on 9 January 1917 in Mirabeau. He was a member of the Association catholique de la jeunesse française as a young man. He was an avid reader of Jacques Maritain and became friends with Maurice Blondel, two Catholic philosophers.

During World War II, he was openly opposed to the Nazis. In 1940, at a meeting of young Catholics in Aix-en-Provence, he expressed his intention to fight back against the German invaders, adding that the real battle consisted in resisting against the totalitarianism of the Hitlerian ideology. Six months later, he lost an eye in battle, and his brother Martial was deported to the Dora concentration camp, where he was murdered by the Nazis.

== Career ==
Montagne started his career as a lawyer shortly after the war, in 1945. He founded L’Eure-Éclair, a weekly newspaper, in 1954.

He served as the Union for French Democracy member of the National Assembly for the 3rd district of Eure from 1958 to 1980. He was then appointed Secretary of State to the Ministry of Health and Social Affairs, where he served for nine months between 1980 and 1981.

In 1985, he founded Ampère, a publishing house. It changed its name to Média-Participations in 1989.

== Personal life ==
He married Geneviève Michelin, the sister of automobile heir François Michelin, on 3 May 1945. They had seven children.

== Death ==
He died in 1991. His biography, authored by Marie-Joëlle Guillaume, was published in 2010.
