= Peugeot VLV =

An electric microcar model (1942)

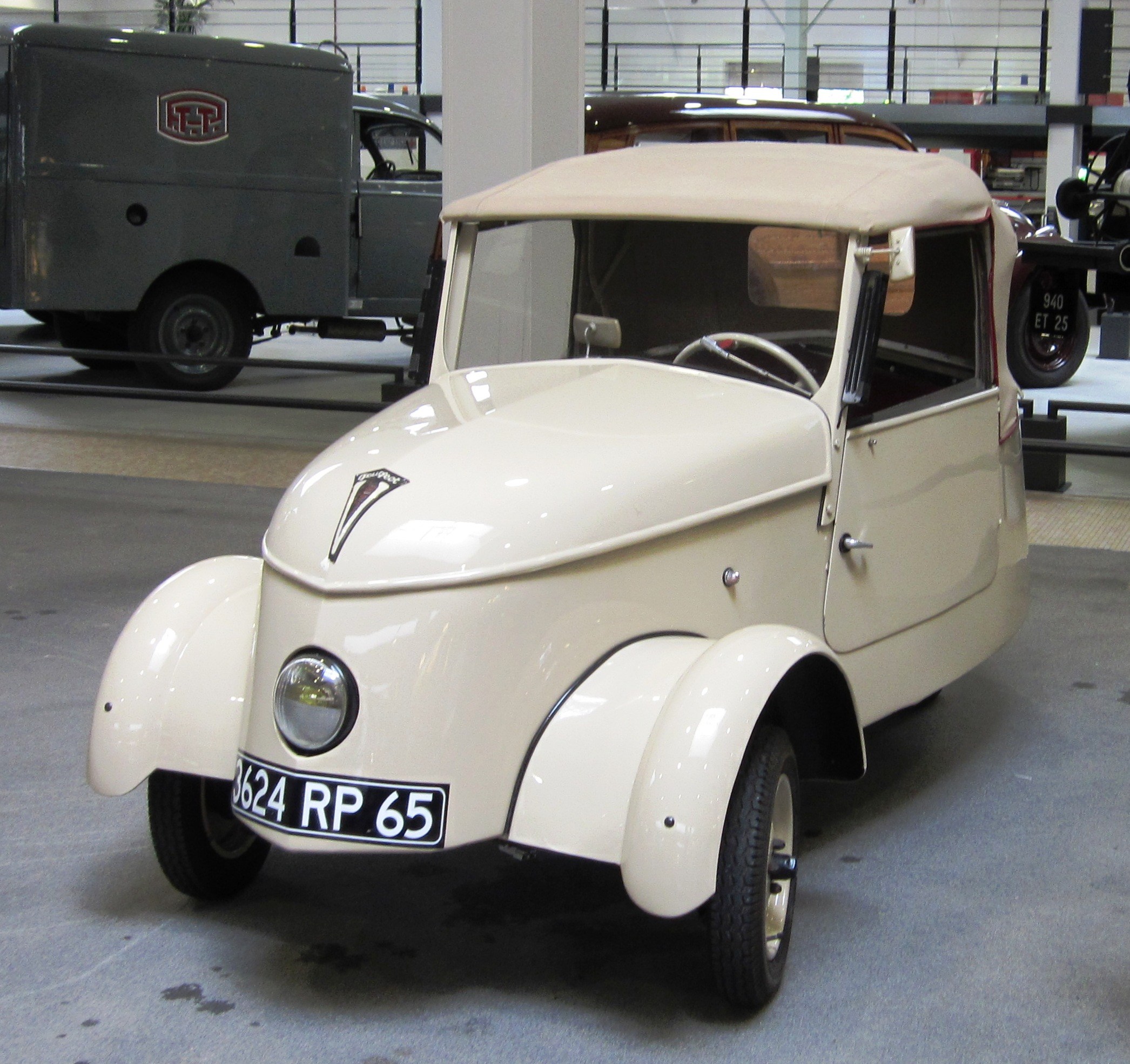
1942 Peugeot VLV at Musée de l'Aventure Peugeot

The Peugeot VLV was an electric microcar made by Peugeot in 1942. VLV stood for Voiture Légère de Ville ("Light City Car"). The car's announcement, on 1 May 1941, triggered some surprise, since Peugeot was the only one of France's large automakers to show interest in electric propulsion at this time.

It was powered by four 12V batteries placed under the hood (bonnet) and a 2.5 kW (3.4 hp) Safi motor, giving it a claimed top speed of 36 km/h (22 mph) and a range of 80 kilometres (50 mi). Charging was completed via a supplied charger that could plug into a standard socket.

The car had two wheels at the front and two at the back. The rear track, however, was very narrow, thus dispensing with the need for a differential for the driving wheels and it utilized only one brake drum for both wheels.

The VLV was built during the war as a way to side-step fuel restrictions imposed on non-military users by the occupying German forces. Yet, it was banned after only 377 examples were built between 1941-1943 and the conventional pre-war Peugeot 202 began production again in 1946.
