= Michelin =

French multinational tyre company

Compagnie Générale des Établissements Michelin SCA

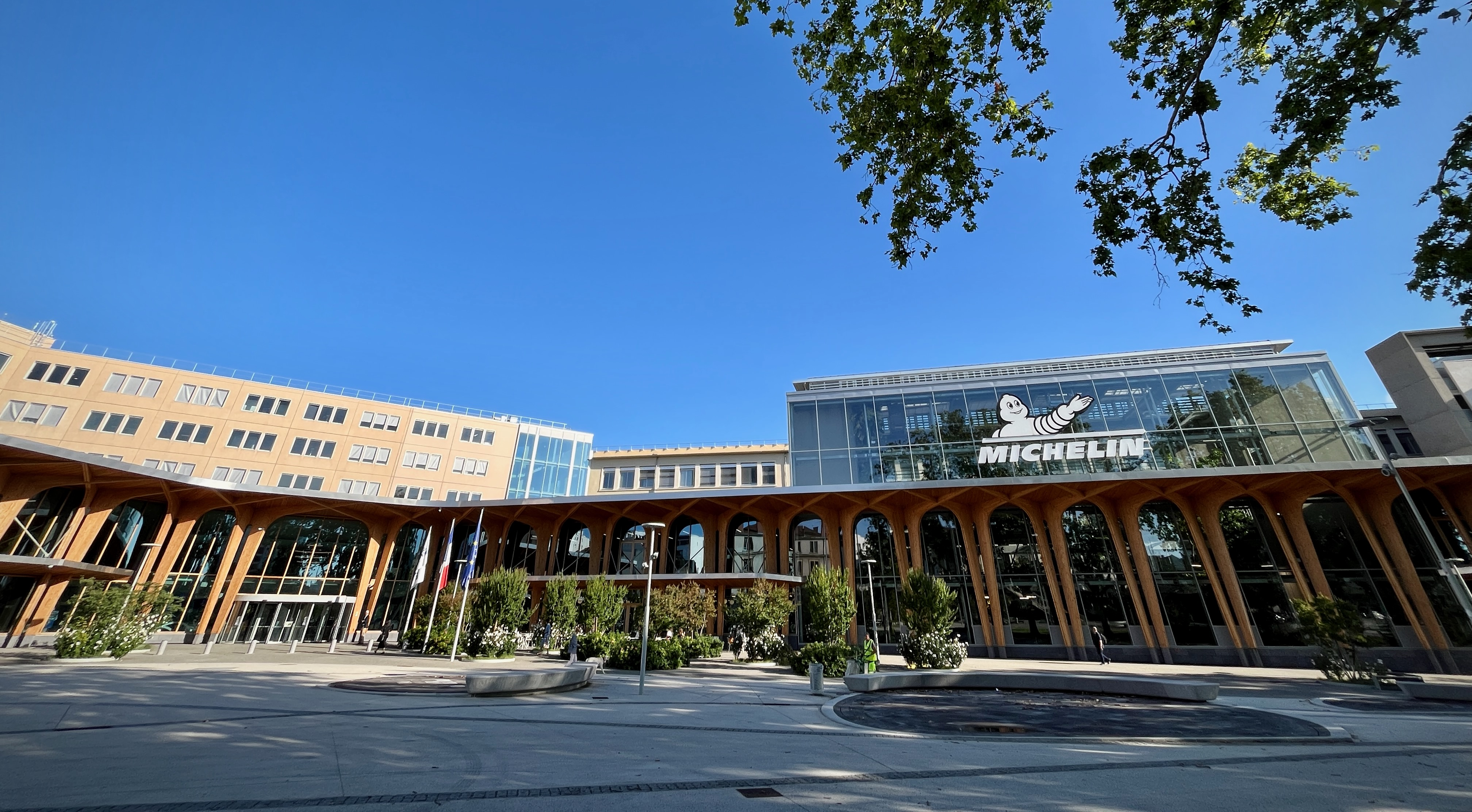
- Headquarters in Clermont-Ferrand, France
- Trade name: Michelin
- Type: Public
- Traded as: Euronext Paris: ML; CAC 40 component
- Industry: Automotive
- Founded: 1832; 194 years ago (Barbier-Daubrée) 28 May 1889; 137 years ago (Reincorporation as Michelin)
- Founders: Édouard Michelin; André Michelin
- Headquarters: Clermont-Ferrand, France
- Area served: Worldwide
- Key people: Florent Menegaux (Managing General Partner, CEO); Michel Rollier (chairman of the Supervisory Board); Yves Chapot (General Manager, CFO)
- Brands: Michelin; BFGoodrich; Kleber; Uniroyal; Blackcircles; Tigar; Riken; Achilles; Corsa; Euromaster; Taurus; Kormoran
- Revenue: ▲€25.99 billion (2025)
- Operating income: ▲€3.4 billion (2025)
- Net income: ▲€1.66 billion (2025)
- Total assets: ▼€35.02 billion (2025)
- Total equity: ▼€18.08 billion (2025)
- Number of employees: 117,495 (2025)
- Subsidiaries: ViaMichelin; ATS Euromaster; TCi Tire Centers; Camso; Multistrada Arah Sarana; Masternaut
- Website: michelin.com

Compagnie Générale des Établissements Michelin SCA ("General Company of the Michelin Enterprises P.L.S."), commonly referred to as Michelin (/ˈmɪʃəlɪn, ˈmɪtʃəlɪn/ MISH-əl-in, MITCH-əl-in, French: [miʃlɛ̃]), is a French multinational tyre manufacturer based in Clermont-Ferrand in the Auvergne-Rhône-Alpes région of France.

In addition to the Michelin brand, it also owns the Kleber Tyre Company, Uniroyal (in North America, Colombia, and Peru), BFGoodrich, Riken, and SASCAR (among various others) brands. Michelin is also notable for its Red and Green travel guides, its roadmaps, the Michelin stars that the Red Guide awards to restaurants for their cooking, and for its company mascot Bibendum, colloquially known as the Michelin Man, who is a humanoid consisting of tyres.

Michelin's numerous inventions include the removable tyre, the pneumatic tyre for automobiles, the pneumatic tyre for trucks, twin tyres on trucks, the asymmetric tyre, the run-flat tyre, the green tyre, the pneurail (a tyre for rubber-tyred metros) and the radial tyre for automobiles, trucks, earthmovers, aircraft, and motorcycles. Michelin manufactures tyres for Space Shuttles, aircraft, automobiles, heavy equipment, motorcycles, and bicycles.

The company has been the world's largest tyre manufacturer by annual revenue since 2021. In 2025 Michelin produced revenue of €25.99 Billion according to its annual financial results.

== History ==
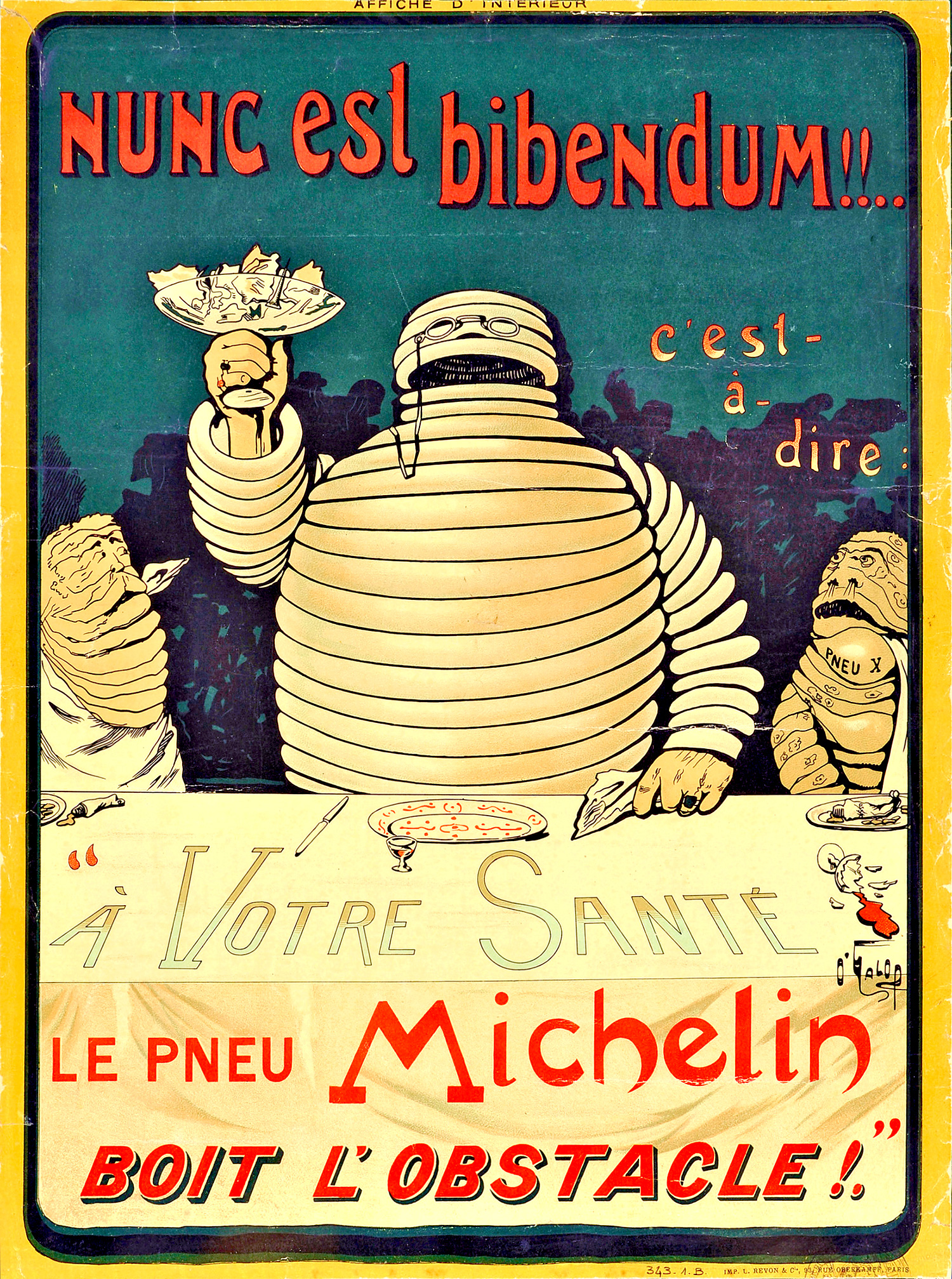
The original 1898 poster by "O'Galop" of Bibendum, the Michelin Man

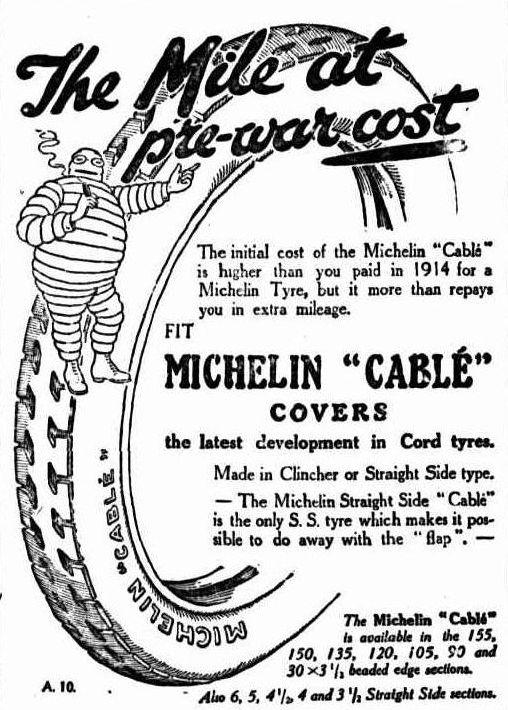
Michelin Cablé print advertisement (Australia, 1922)

Demonstration of the Michelin "car-train" with rubber tyres in the Netherlands in 1932

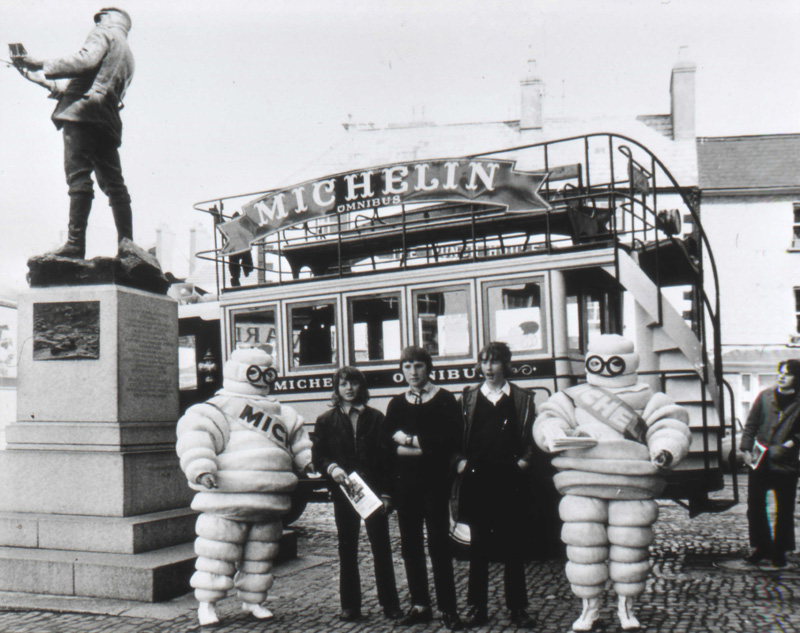
View of old-fashioned Michelin omnibus and two Michelin Men with bystanders behind Charles Rolls statue, Monmouth, Wales, c. 1965–1970

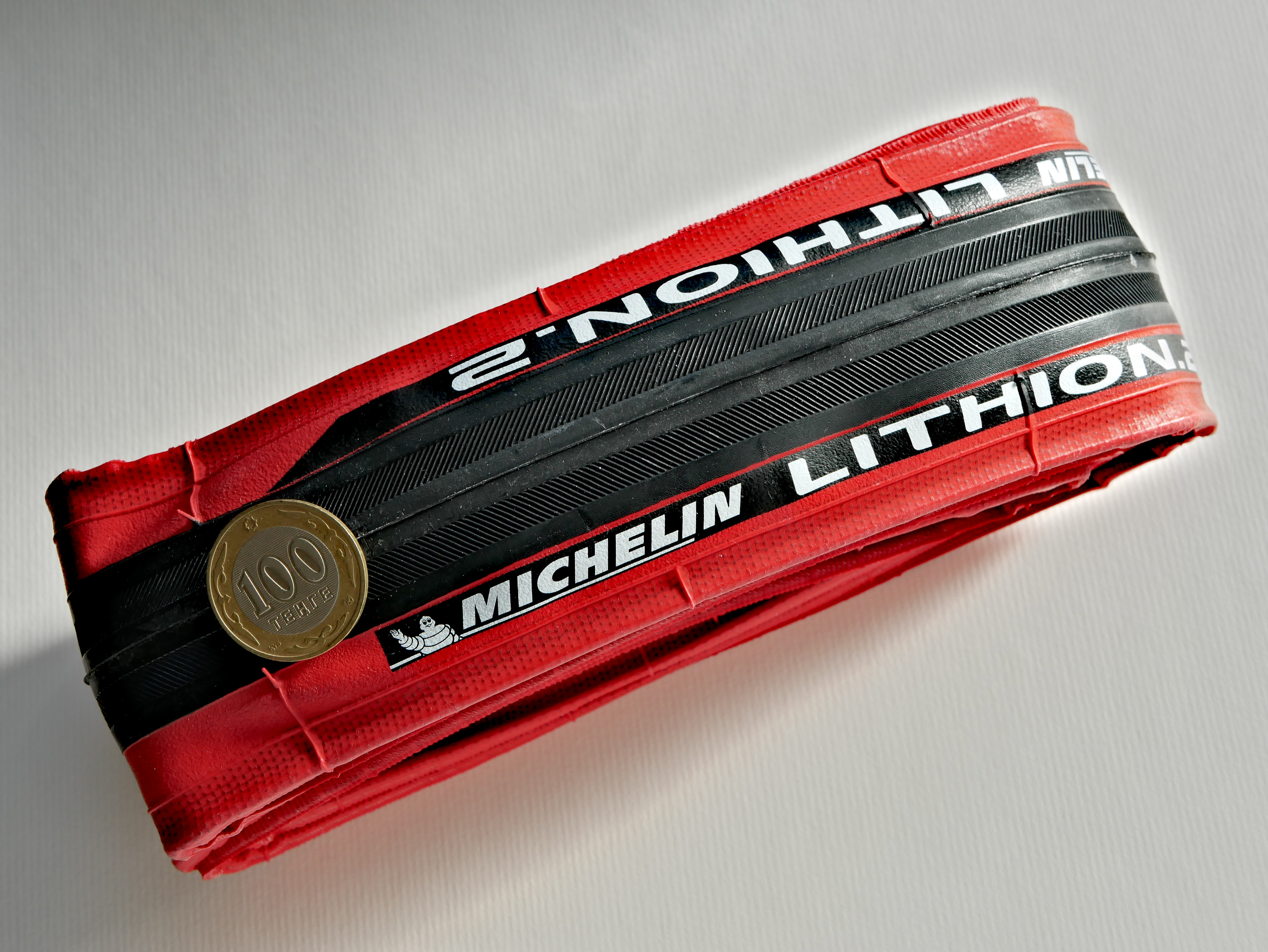
A Michelin Lithion 2 road bicycle tyre

In 1889, two brothers, Édouard Michelin (1859–1940) and André Michelin (1853–1931), took over Barbier Daubrée, a struggling farm implement business founded in 1832 in Clermont-Ferrand, France. Barbier-Daubrée manufactured rubber parts for farm machinery such as valves and gaskets and other rubber items such as balls and brake pads. One day a cyclist whose pneumatic tyre needed repair turned up at the factory. The tyre was glued to the rim, and it took over three hours to remove and repair the tyre, which then needed to be left overnight to dry.

The next day, Édouard Michelin took the repaired bicycle into the factory yard to test. After only a few hundred metres, the tyre failed. Despite the setback, Édouard was enthusiastic about the pneumatic tyre, and he and his brother worked on creating their own version, one that did not need to be glued to the rim. Barbier-Daubrée was reincorporated and renamed as Michelin on 28 May 1889. In 1891 Michelin took out its first patent for a removable pneumatic tyre which was used by Charles Terront to win the world's first long-distance cycle race, the 1891 Paris–Brest–Paris. Four years later, Michelin created the world's first pneumatic tyres (originally pioneered in 1888 by John Boyd Dunlop for bicycles) for automobiles, using them in a car called L'Eclair competing in the 1895 Paris-Bordeaux-Paris race.

In the 1920s and 1930s, Michelin operated large rubber plantations in Vietnam. Conditions at these plantations led to the famous labour movement Phú Riềng Đỏ.

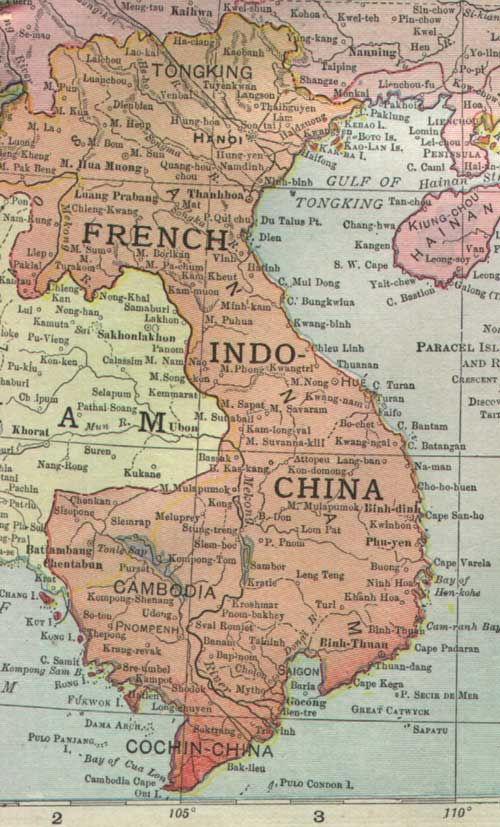
Michelin's domination of the supply of rubber in French Indochina led to the Phú Riềng Đỏ strike in 1930. This resulted in France investigating Michelin's treatment of workers on its rubber plantations.

In 1934, Michelin introduced a tyre which, if punctured, would run on a special foam lining, a design now known as a run-flat tyre (self-supporting type).

Michelin developed and patented a key innovation in tyre history, the 1946 radial tyre, and successfully exploited this technological innovation to become one of the world's leading tyre manufacturers. The radial was initially marketed as the "X" tyre. It was developed with the front-wheel-drive Citroën Traction Avant and Citroën 2CV in mind.

Michelin had bought the then-bankrupt Citroën in the 1930s. Because of its superiority in handling and fuel economy, use of this tyre quickly spread throughout Europe and Asia. In the U.S., the outdated bias-ply tyre persisted, with a market share of 87% in 1967. Michelin also introduced the XAS, the world's first asymmetric tyre, in 1964.

In 1966, Michelin partnered with Sears to produce radial tyres under the Allstate brand and was selling 1 million units annually by 1970.

In 1968, Michelin opened its first North American sales office, and was able to grow that market for its products rapidly; by 1989 the company had a 10% market share for OEM tyres purchased by American automobile makers.

Also in 1968, Consumer Reports, an influential American magazine, acknowledged the superiority of the radial construction, setting off a rapid decline in Michelin's competitor technology. In the U.S., the radial tyre now has a market share of 100%.

In addition to the private label and replacement tyre market, Michelin scored an early OEM tyre win in North America, when it received the contract for the 1970 Continental Mark III, the first American car with radial tyres fitted as standard.

In 1989, Michelin acquired the recently merged tyre and rubber manufacturing divisions of the American firms B.F. Goodrich Company (founded in 1870) and Uniroyal, Inc. (founded in 1892 as the United States Rubber Company) from Clayton, Dubilier & Rice. Uniroyal Australia had already been bought by Bridgestone in 1980. This purchase included the Norwood, North Carolina manufacturing plant which supplied tyres to the U.S. Space Shuttle Program.

Also in 1989, Michelin created Michelin Okamoto Tire Corporation, a joint venture with Japanese rubber/condom manufacturer Okamoto Industries, who already owned the Riken brand. In Japan, MOTC marketed Michelin, BFGoodrich, and Riken, which Michelin still markets today as a budget performance tyre brand.

In 1994, Michelin Okamoto launched the Green X line of fuel-saving tyres, a line of studless winter tyres: the Maxi-Glace (a version of the XM+S 100 for the Japanese market), W-Edge (rebranded XM+S Alpin), and the Maxi Ice, as well as a high performance tire, the GTX Virage, which was also marketed as the MXF Sport in some countries. The joint venture was later terminated in 2000, with Michelin buying all of Okamoto's shares.

In 1992, Michelin unveiled the green tyre, a tyre featuring Green X technology, advertised as saving fuel, lowering rolling resistance, and reducing emissions, in that year's Paris Motor Show with the MXN, a variant of their MXT tyre.

The green tyres was launched to the public released in 1994, marketed as the Energy in Europe and the rest of the world, and as the Green X in Japan. In Europe, the Energy launched with the Energy MXT, a fuel-saving version of their regular MXT tyre and the Energy MXV3-A for luxury cars. In 1997, the Energy MXV4, an asymmetric luxury performance tyre, was added to the lineup.

In Japan, the Green X line began with the MXGS in 1994. The line later consisted of the MXGS, MXT Green (released in 1996), MXV3-A Green (released in 1997), MXV4 Green (also released in 1997), MXE Green (a successor to the MXT, released in 1998), and the MXK Green (for kei cars, released in 1999). In the early 2000s, the series was unified globally as the Energy, and is still sold today as the Energy Saver line.

As of 1 September 2008, Michelin is again the world's largest tyre manufacturer after spending two years as number two behind Bridgestone. Michelin produces tyres in France, Serbia, Poland, Spain, Germany, the US, the UK, Canada, Brazil, Thailand, Japan, India, Italy and several other countries.

On 15 January 2010, Michelin announced the closing of its Ota, Japan plant, which employs 380 workers and makes the Michelin X-Ice tyre. Production of the X-Ice will be moved to Europe, North America, and elsewhere in Asia. In 2019, Michelin announced that plants in Germany and France are to be closed soon.

In 2010, Michelin introduced its sonic identity, created by the agency Sixième Son, notably presented at the Paris Motor Show and deployed across the brand’s communications. The sonic signature was rolled out internationally across advertising, audiovisual content and brand touchpoints.

Michelin also controls 90% of Taurus Tyre in Hungary, as well as Kormoran, a Polish brand.

In December 2018, Michelin acquired Camso, a manufacturer of off-the-road tyres, tracks, and accessories for power sports, agriculture, material handling and construction markets.

On 22 January 2019, it was announced that Michelin had acquired Indonesian manufacturer Multistrada Arah Sarana, which produces Achilles Radial and Corsa tyres. On 19 June that year, Michelin owns 99.64% of the share capital of Multistrada.

In April 2026, Michelin announced the completion of its acquisition of the American company Flexitallic.

== Motorsport ==
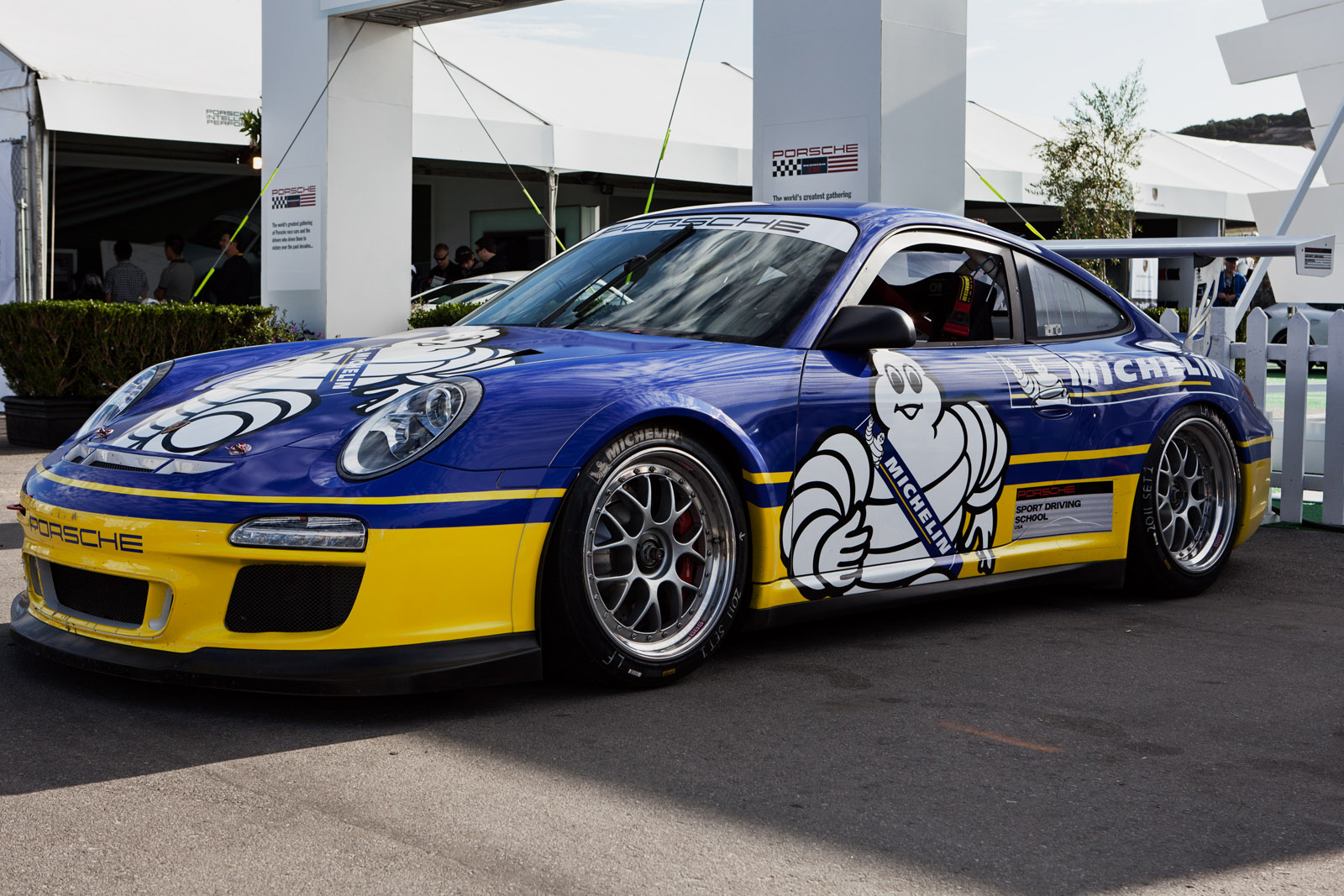
Michelin is the official tyre supplier of the Porsche 911 GT3 Cup cars used in the Porsche Carrera Cup and the Porsche Supercup.

=== MotoGP ===
From 1972 to 2008, Michelin was the long-standing supplier for MotoGP.

In 2007, Casey Stoner on Bridgestone tyres won the world championship in dominating fashion, and Valentino Rossi and other top riders complained that Michelins were inferior. Rossi wanted Bridgestones for the 2008 season, but Bridgestone was reluctant to provide them; Dorna threatened to impose a control tyre on the series, after which Bridgestone relented.

In 2008, Michelin committed errors of judgment in allocating adequate tyres for some of the race weekends. Dani Pedrosa's team switched to Bridgestones in mid-season, a highly unusual move that caused friction between Honda Racing Corporation and their sponsor Repsol YPF. Other riders also expressed concerns and it seemed that Michelin might not have any factory riders for the 2009 season, leading to rumours that Michelin would withdraw from the series altogether.

Dorna and the FIM announced that a control tyre would be imposed on MotoGP for the 2009 season and Michelin did not enter a bid, effectively ending its participation in the series at the end of 2008.

Michelin returned to MotoGP in 2016 as the official tyre supplier after Bridgestone's withdrawal from the series at the end of 2015.

=== Formula One ===
Michelin first competed in the 1977 Formula One season, when Renault started the development of their turbocharged F1 car. Michelin introduced radial tyre technology to Formula One and won the Formula One Drivers' Championship with Brabham and McLaren, before withdrawing at the end of 1984.

The company returned to Formula One in 2001, supplying the Williams, Jaguar, Benetton (renamed Renault in 2002), Prost and Minardi teams. Toyota joined F1 in 2002 with Michelin tyres, and McLaren also signed up with the company. Michelin Tyres were initially uncompetitive but by the 2005 season were dominant.

This was partly because the new regulations stated that tyres must last the whole race distance (and qualifying), and partly because only one top team (Ferrari) was running Bridgestones, and so had to do much of the development work. Michelin in contrast had much more testing and race data provided by the larger number of teams running their tyres.

Following the debacle of the 2005 United States Grand Prix where, because of safety concerns, Michelin would not allow the teams it supplied to race, Michelin's share price fell by 2.5% (though it recovered later the same day). On 28 June, Michelin announced that it would offer compensation to all race fans who had bought tickets for the Grand Prix. The company committed to refunding the price of all tickets for the race. Additionally, it announced that it would provide 20,000 complimentary tickets for the 2006 race to spectators who had attended the 2005 event.

Michelin has had a difficult relationship with the sport's governing body (the FIA) since around 2003 and this escalated to apparent disdain between the two parties during the 2005 season. The most high-profile disagreement was at the United States Grand Prix and the acrimony afterwards. Michelin criticised the FIA's intention to move to a single source (i.e. one brand) tyre from 2008 and threatened to withdraw from the sport.

In a public rebuke, FIA President Max Mosley wrote: "There are simple arguments for a single tyre, and if [Michelin boss Édouard Michelin] is not aware of this, he shows an almost comical lack of knowledge of modern Formula One." Another bone of contention has been the reintroduction of tyre changes during pit-stops from 2006. Michelin criticised the move claiming "this event illustrates F1's problems of incoherent decision-making and lack of transparency".

In December 2005, and as a result of the difficult relationship with the sport's governing body, Michelin announced that it would not extend its involvement in Formula One beyond the 2006 season. Bridgestone was then the sole supplier of tyres to Formula One until the end of the 2010 season, with Pirelli providing tyres for 2011.

The last race won on Michelin tyres in Formula One was the 2006 Japanese Grand Prix, Fernando Alonso benefitted after the Ferrari engine of Michael Schumacher failed during the race. This gave Michelin a second consecutive Constructors' Championship win, with the 2005 and 2006, after Bridgestone's seven-year winning streak, and brought to a total of four the number of titles for Michelin since this championship's inception back in the 1958 Formula One season; Michelin's other titles were in the 1979, and 1984 seasons.

=== Endurance racing ===
Michelin is involved in endurance races such as the 24 Hours of Le Mans and the American Le Mans Series. Involvement in Le Mans began with supplying tyres for the winner of the inaugural 1923 24 Hours of Le Mans as well as nine others of the 33 entrants. In 2009 Michelin supplied tyres for 41 of the 55 cars that entered in Le Mans.

In 2016, they provided tyres to the Audi, Porsche and Toyota LMP1 teams, as well as the AF Corse, BMW, Corvette, Ford Ganassi, Porsche and Risi teams in GTE-Pro / GTLM. Beginning in 2019, Michelin will replace Continental as the official tyre of the WeatherTech SportsCar Championship. Along with supplying tyres for IMSA's top three series, the partnership includes naming rights for the Sports Car Challenge series and the North American Endurance Cup.

Michelin has also supplied tyres in the European Le Mans Series. They have been the exclusive supplier of the LMP3 class since 2015.

=== Rallying ===
In the World Rally Championship, Michelin has been the supplier of the Audi, Citroën, Ford, Lancia, Mitsubishi, Peugeot, Toyota and Volkswagen factory teams. Michelin Group brand BFGoodrich represented the brand in 2006 and 2007. The company was absent from 2008 to 2010, when Pirelli was signed as the official supplier, after which they returned to the series as an official supplier from 2011 to 2020 until Pirelli won the tender to once again become an official supplier from 2021 onwards.

== Recent developments ==
- Pax System
- Tweel
- X One
- Agri
- BAZ Technology. Michelin employs specific tread construction, that uses spiral-wrapped nylon strips. The strips are applied in the tread area above steel belts in order to oppose centrifugal force, in order to avoid tyre distortion at high speeds.
- EverGrip Technology. This is a patented safety technology that allows combining tread groove design. This way, it does not just wear down, but evolves due to high traction tread compound, which makes driving safer on snowy and wet roads.
- Zero Pressure Technology means a reinforced sidewall that is designed to continue supporting the vehicle's weight even when air pressure is lost. The technology allows driving at speeds between 50 and 55 mph for some time.

=== Active Wheel ===
Active Wheel from Michelin includes in-wheel electric motors and a motorised suspension to free up space in the front or rear of the vehicle. This model also eliminates the need for other notorious space hogs like transmissions and exhaust systems. The wheels already have a vehicle ready to receive them, the Heuliez Will from Opel, and are also expected to come standard on the Venturi Volage sometime in 2012. The project was interrupted in 2014.

== Other products ==
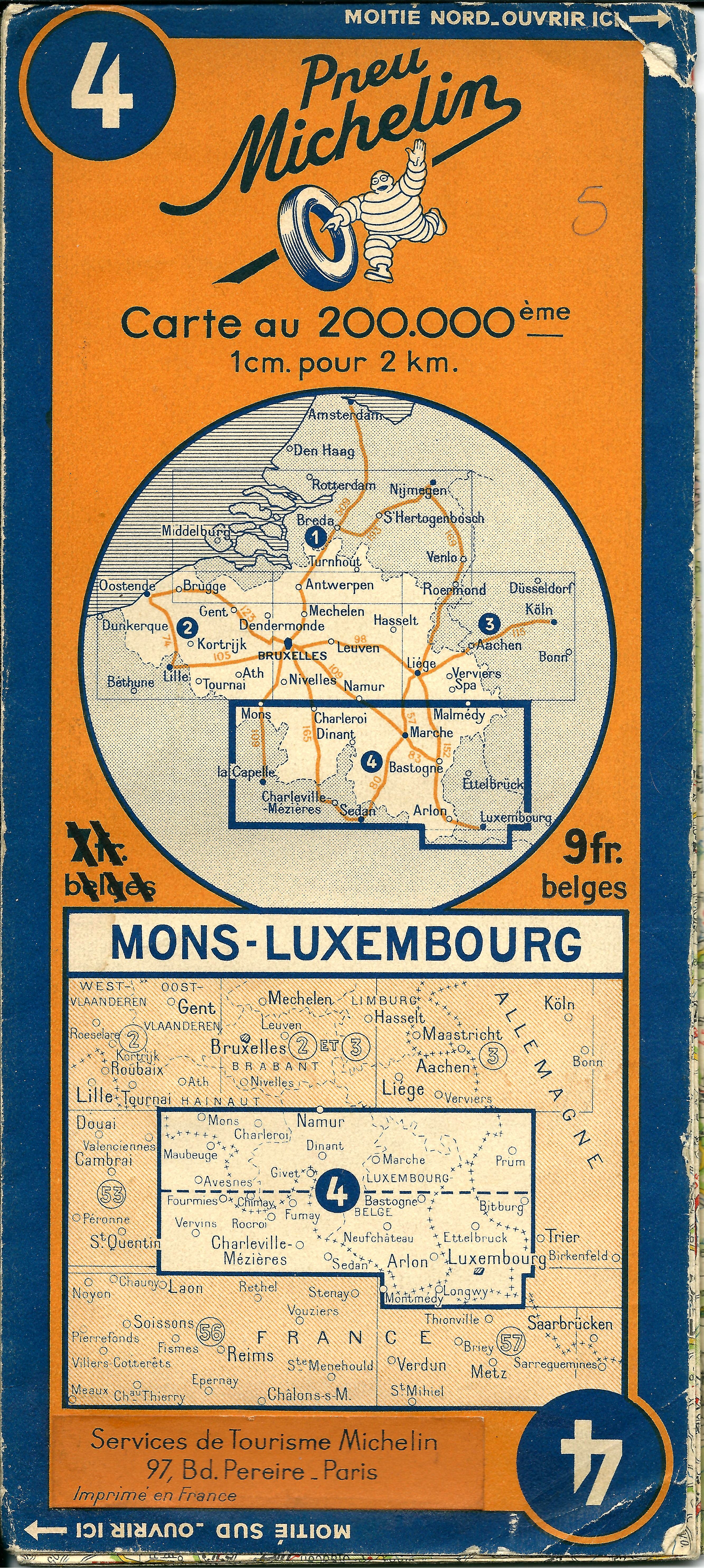
Michelin map nr 4 (South Belgium) of 1940

=== Tyre retailer ===
Michelin operates tyre retail and distribution in Europe under Euromaster and Blackcircles brands, and in the US with its wholly owned subsidiary TCI Tire Centers. TCI tire centers was folded into NTW, when Michelin partnered with Sumitomo to form the entity. The company also manages its own e-commerce store, michelinman.com.

=== Tour guides ===
Michelin has long published two guidebook series, the Red Guides for Hotels and Restaurants, and the Green Guides for tourism. It now publishes several additional guides, as well as digital maps and guide products. The city maps in both the Red and the Green guides are of high quality, and are linked to the smaller-scale road maps.

=== Maps ===
Michelin publishes a variety of road maps, mostly of France but also of other European countries, countries in Africa, Thailand and the United States. They have recently embarked on e-commerce selling Michelin maps and guides directly to the public through, for example, their UK website. The Michelin roadmaps were reproduced in England for the Allied invasion during World War II. In 1940, the Germans also reproduced the 1938 edition of Michelin maps for the invasion.

=== Online mapping ===
ViaMichelin is a wholly owned subsidiary of Michelin Group, and was started in 2001, to represent Michelin's digital mapping services. As of August 2008, ViaMichelin generates 400 million maps and routes per month on its main website.

ViaMichelin provides mapping for internet, mobile and satellite navigation products with street level coverage of Europe, USA, Australia, and parts of Asia and South America.

=== Michelin Challenge Bibendum / Movin'On (since 2017) ===
The Michelin Challenge Bibendum is a major sustainable mobility event.

=== Michelin Truck and Bus ===
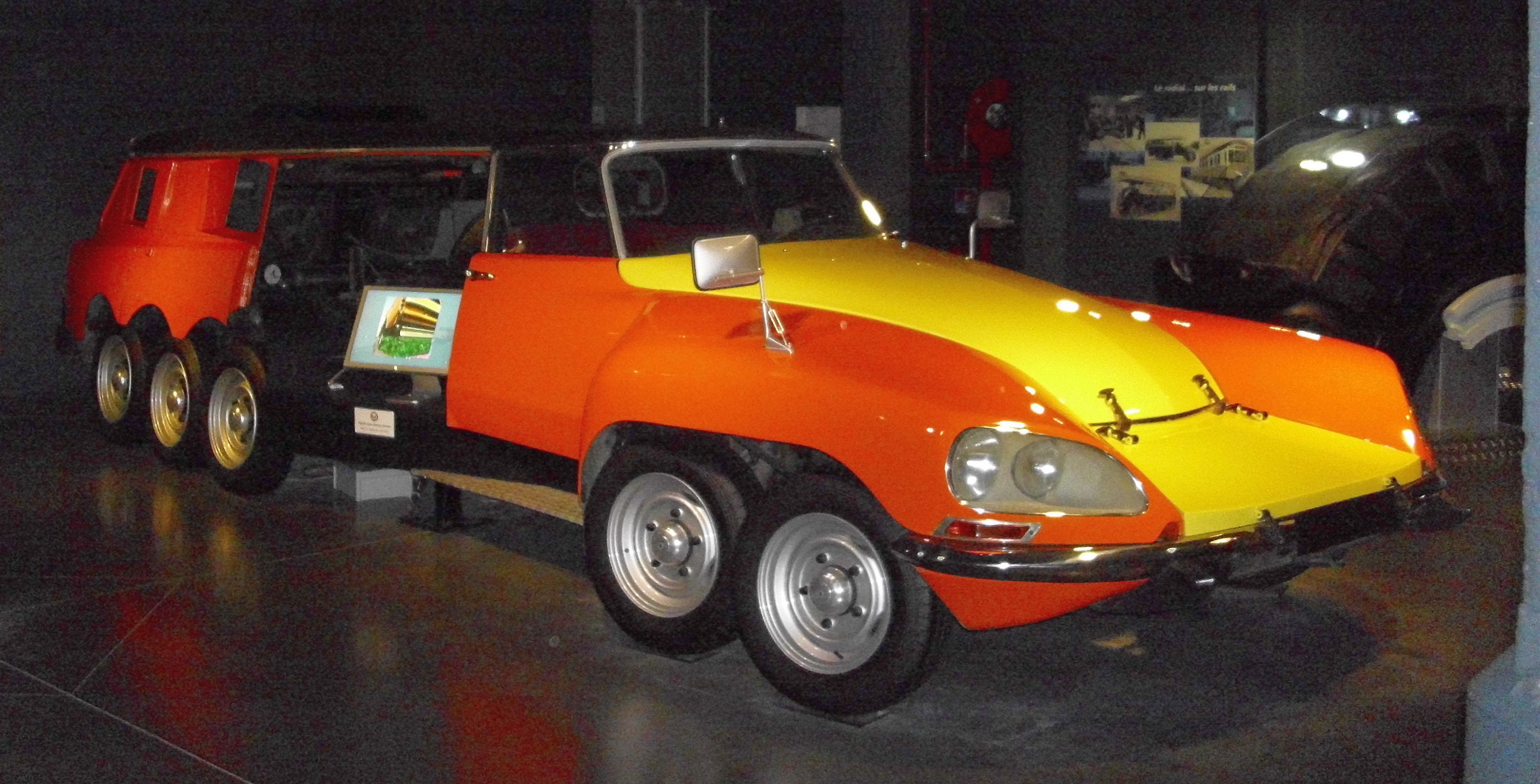
The Michelin PLR, a 1972 mobile tyre evaluation machine, based on the Citroën DS Break

In 1952, 6 years after Michelin patented its Radial Casing, Michelin adapted the radial technology to truck tyres.

== Management ==
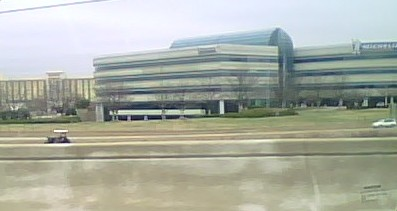
Michelin's North America headquarters in Greenville, South Carolina, United States

From 1999, the company was headed by CEO Édouard Michelin. On 26 May 2006, Édouard drowned while fishing near the island of Sein, off the coast of Brittany. His death brought Michel Rollier, a 2nd cousin of Édouard Michelin, to the head of the company. Rollier was replaced in May 2012 by Jean-Dominique Senard. In 2018, Jean-Dominique Senard announced he would not seek re-election at the shareholders' meeting in 2019. As a result, the shareholders elected Florent Menegaux to succeed Senard starting in 2019.

The company also has its headquarters in Greenville, South Carolina, United States as Michelin North America. They first manufactured in the city in 1975 before opening up their headquarters a decade later.

=== Corporate governance ===
Corporate governance consists of two managers and an executive committee whose members are:

- Philippe Jacquin, Executive Vice President, Research & Development
- Lorraine Frega, Executive Vice President, Distribution, Services & Solutions, Strategy, Innovation and Partnerships
- Yves Chapot, General Manager and Chief Financial Officer
- Adeline Challon-Kemoun, Executive Vice President, Engagement and Brands
- Jean-Claude Pats, Executive Vice President, Personnel
- Bénédicte de Bonnechose, Executive Vice President, Urban and Long-Distance Transportation and European Regions
- Pierre-Louis Dubourdeau, Executive Vice President, Manufacturing
- Florent Menegaux, Managing Chairman
- Scott Clark, Executive Vice President, Automotive, Motorsports, Experiences and Americas Regions
- Serge Lafon, Executive Vice President, Specialties and Africa/India/Middle East, China, East Asia and Australia Regions
- Maude Portigliatti, Executive Vice President, High-Tech Materials.

== Finances ==
	2016	2017	2018	2019	2020	2021	2022	2023	2024	2025
Total revenue (€ billions)	20.9	22.0	22.0	24.1	20.5	23.8	28.6	28.3	27.2	26.0
Operating income (€ billions)	2.6	2.6	2.7	2.9	1.8	2.9	3.4	3.3	3.1	2.5
Net income (€ billions)	1.7	1.7	1.7	1.8	0.6	1.8	2.0	2.0	1.9	1.7
Total assets (€ billions)	25.3	25.3	29.5	31.7	31.6	34.7	35.4	35.2	37.4	35.0
Total equity (€ billions)	10.7	11.3	12.2	13.2	12.6	15.0	17.1	18.0	18.6	18.1
Employees	105,654	107,807	111,117	121,339	119,892	121,274	128,908	129,316	121,610	117,495

== See also ==
- Budd–Michelin rubber-tired rail cars
- List of tire companies
- Michelin rubber plantation
