= List of Franco-Belgian comics series =

Franco-Belgian comics, together with American and British comic books and Japanese manga, are one of the three main markets. The term is broad, and can be applied to all comics made by French and Belgian comics authors, all comics originally published by French and Belgian comics publishers, or all comics in the styles appearing in the Franco-Belgian comics magazines Tintin and Spirou, possibly expanded to include later magazines like Pilote, Métal Hurlant, and A Suivre. Comics which are not created in French but in Dutch are sometimes included and sometimes excluded from the Franco-Belgian comics. For this list, a broad definition is taken, including all notable comics series first published by a French or Belgian publisher, no matter what language or nationality the authors have. For series with many different authors (e.g. Spirou & Fantasio), only the most important authors have been included.

Series	Volumes	Publication	Main artists	Main writers	Original publishers	English language publishers	Website
421 ^{(NL)}	10	1984–1992	Eric Maltaite	Stephen Desberg	Dupuis		
Achille Talon	43	1963–1999	Greg	Greg	Dargaud		
Adler	10	1987–2003	René Sterne	René Sterne	Le Lombard		
Amoras ^{(NL)}	6	2013–2015	Charel Cambré	Marc Legendre	Standaard Uitgeverij		
Adèle Blanc-Sec	10	1976 - ...	Jacques Tardi	Jacques Tardi	Casterman	NBM Publishing, Dark Horse Comics	
Agent 212	30	1981 - ...	Daniël Kox	Raoul Cauvin	Dupuis		
The Adventures of Alix	41	1948 - ...	Jacques Martin, Rafael Moralès, Ferry	Jacques Martin	Casterman	Ward Lock & Co	
Worlds of Aldebaran	25	1994 - ...	Léo	Léo	Dargaud	Cinebook	
Aquablue	17	1988 - ...	Olivier Vatine, Ciro Tota and Siro	Thierry Cailleteau	Delcourt	Dark Horse Comics	
Aria	40	1982 - 2021	Michel Weyland	Michel Weyland	Le Lombard and Dupuis		
Asterix	40	1959 - ...	Albert Uderzo	René Goscinny and Albert Uderzo	Dargaud, Hachette and Les Editions Albert René	Brockhampton Press, Dargaud and Orion Books	
Bakelandt ^{(NL)}	96	1975–2006	Hec Leemans	Hec Leemans and Daniël Janssen	Standaard Uitgeverij		
Barbarella	4	1964-1982	Jean-Claude Forest	Jean-Claude Forest	Losfeld and Les Humanoïdes Associés		
Barelli	8	1956–1980	Bob de Moor	Bob de Moor	Le Lombard		
Bécassine	29	1905 - ?	Joseph Pinchon	Maurice Languereau	Gautier-Languereau		
The Bellybuttons	4	2004 - ...	Delaf	Maryse Dubuc	Dupuis	Cinebook	
Benoît Brisefer (Steven Strong)	14	1960 - 2004	Peyo	Peyo	Dupuis and Le Lombard		
Bernard Prince	17	1966 - ...	Hermann	Greg	Le Lombard		
Bessy ^{(NL)}	164	1954–1985	Willy Vandersteen and Studio Vandersteen	Willy Vandersteen and Studio Vandersteen	Standaard Uitgeverij		
Billy the Cat	11	1990 - ...	Stéphane Colman and Peral	Stephen Desberg	Dupuis		
Black Moon Chronicles	13	1989 - ...	Olivier Ledroit and Cyril Pontet	François Marcela-Froideval	Dargaud		
Blacksad	7	2000 - ...	Juanjo Guarnido	Juan Díaz Canales	Dargaud	iBooks	
Blake and Mortimer	30	1946 - ...	Edgar P. Jacobs	Edgar P. Jacobs	Le Lombard and Editions Blake et Mortimer	Editions Blake et Mortimer, Catalan Communications and Cinebook	
Blondin et Cirage ^{(FR)}	9	1942–1956	Jijé and Victor Hubinon	Jijé and Victor Hubinon	Averbode and Dupuis		
Blueberry	28	1963 - 2007	Jean Giraud	Jean-Michel Charlier	Dargaud	Egmont Publishing, Methuen Publishing, Epic Comics, Catalan Communications, Mojo Press, Dark Horse Comics, Dargaud	
Bobo	16	1961–1997	Paul Deliège	Paul Deliège and Maurice Rosy	Dupuis		
Boule et Bill	31	1960 - ...	Jean Roba, Laurent Verron^{FR}	Jean Roba, Laurent Verron	Dupuis and Dargaud		
Bruno Brazil	11	1969–1995	William Vance	Greg	Dargaud		
Buck Danny	52	1947 - ...	Victor Hubinon and Francis Bergèse	Jean-Michel Charlier and Francis Bergèse	Dupuis	Cinebook	
Buddy Longway	20	1972–2006	Derib	Derib	Le Lombard		
Canardo	25	1979 - ...	Benoît Sokal	Benoît Sokal	Casterman	Fantagraphics, NBM Publishing	
Carthago	16	2007 - ...		Christophe Bec	Les Humanoïdes Associés		
Cédric	29	1989 - ...	Laudec	Raoul Cauvin	Dupuis	Cinebook	
Le Chant des Stryges ^{(FR)}	11	1997 - ...	Richard Guérineau	Eric Corbeyran	Delcourt		
Le Chat	21	1986 - ...	Philippe Geluck	Philippe Geluck	Casterman		
Le Château des Animaux	2	2018 - ...	Félix Delep		Casterman		
Chevalier Ardent ^{(FR)}	20	1970–2001	François Craenhals	François Craenhals	Casterman		
Chick Bill	70	1955 - ...	Tibet	Tibet	Le Lombard		
Chlorophylle ^{(FR)}	21	1956–1989	Raymond Macherot, Dupa and Walli	Raymond Macherot, Greg, Bob de Groot and Bom	Le Lombard		
Les Cités Obscures	11	1983 - ...	François Schuiten	Benoît Peeters	Casterman	NBM Publishing	
Clifton	23	1959 - ...	Raymond Macherot and Turk	Raymond Macherot and Bob de Groot	Le Lombard and Dargaud	Cinebook	
Comanche ^{(FR)}	15	1972–2002	Hermann and Michel Rouge	Greg	Dargaud and Le Lombard		
Corentin	7	1950–1974	Paul Cuvelier	Paul Cuvelier	Le Lombard		
Cubitus	42	1969 - ...	Dupa	Dupa	Le Lombard		
Cupidon	23	1990 - ...	Malik	Raoul Cauvin	Dupuis		
Dan Cooper	41	1957–1992	Albert Weinberg	Albert Weinberg	Le Lombard		
De cape et de crocs	12	1995 - ...	Jean-Luc Masbou	Alain Ayroles	Delcourt		
Les Démons d'Alexia ^{(FR)}	7	2004–2011	Benoît Ers, Scarlett	Vincent Dugomier	Dupuis		
Le Donjon de Naheulbeuk	4+1	2005 - ...	Marion Poinsot	John Lang	Clair de Lune		
Ducoboo	13	1997 - ...	Godi	Zidrou	Le Lombard	Cinebook	
Dungeon	48	1998 - ...	Lewis Trondheim, Joann Sfar, Christophe Blain and Emmanuel Larcenet	Lewis Trondheim and Joann Sfar	Delcourt	NBM Publishing	
Fantax	39	1946–1961	Chott	J. K. Melwyn-Nash	Bedesup		
F.C. De Kampioenen^{(NL)}	109	1997 - ...	Hec Leemans	Hec Leemans	Standaard Uitgeverij		
Les Femmes en Blanc	32	1986 - ...	Philippe Bercovici	Raoul Cauvin	Dupuis		
Gai-Luron	11	1975–1986	Marcel Gotlieb	Marcel Gotlieb	Audie		
Gaston Lagaffe	16	1960–1996	André Franquin	André Franquin	Dupuis		
Génial Olivier	20	1974–1989	Jacques Devos	Jacques Devos	Dupuis		
Le Génie des alpages	14	1974 - ...	F'Murr	F'Murr	Dargaud		
Gil Jourdan	16	1959–1979	Maurice Tillieux	Maurice Tillieux	Dupuis		
HK	5	1996 - ...	Kevin "Trantkat" Hérault	Jean-David Morvan	Glénat		
The Incal	13	1981–2000	Jean Giraud (Moebius)	Alejandro Jodorowsky	Les Humanoïdes Associés	Epic Comics, Humanoids Publishing	
Les Innommables	12	1996–2004	Yann le Pennetier	Didier Conrad	Dargaud		
Isabelle	12	1970–2000	Will	Will, Yvan Delporte, Raymond Macherot and André Franquin	Dupuis		
Iznogoud	31	1966 - ...	Jean Tabary	René Goscinny and Jean Tabary	Dargaud	Egmont Publishing and Cinebook	
Jeannette Pointu	20	1982 - ...	Marc Wasterlain	Marc Wasterlain	Dupuis		
Jean Valhardi ^{(FR)}	17	1943–1987	Jijé, Eddy Paape and René Follet	Jean Doisy, Jean-Michel Charlier, Jijé and Mouminoux	Dupuis		
Jeremiah	39	1979 - ...	Hermann	Hermann	Fleurus, Novedi and Dupuis	Fantagraphics, Catalan Communications, Adventure Comics, Strip Art Features and Dark Horse Comics	
Jerom ^{(NL)}	95	1962–1982	Studio Vandersteen	Studio Vandersteen	Standaard Uitgeverij		
Jérôme K. Jérôme Bloche ^{(FR)}	20	1985 - ...	Alain Dodier	A. Dodier, S. Le Tendre, P. Makyo	Dupuis		
Jerry Spring	22	1955–1990	Jijé	Jijé	Dupuis		
Jo, Zette and Jocko	5	1936–1957	Hergé	Hergé	Casterman	Methuen Publishing, Egmont Publishing	
Joe-Bar-Team	6	1990 - ...	Bar2, 'Fane	Bar2, 'Fane	Vents d'Ouest	Comics World Ltd	
Johan and Peewit	17	1954–2001	Peyo	Peyo	Dupuis and Le Lombard	Fantasy Flight Publishing	
Jommeke	320	1955 - ...	Jef Nys	Jef Nys	Standaard Uitgeverij		
Jonathan ^{(FR)}	13	1977 - ...	Cosey	Cosey	Le Lombard	Catalan Communications	
J.ROM - Force of Gold ^{(NL)}	5	2014 - 2016	Romano Molenaar	Bruno De Roover	Standaard Uitgeverij		
Kid Paddle	11	1996 - ...	Midam	Midam	Dupuis		
Kiekeboe	159	1978 - ...	Merho	Merho	Standaard Uitgeverij		
Kramikske ^{(NL)}	23	1976–2010	Jean-Pol	Jos Daniël	Het Volk		
Lanfeust of Troy	8	1994–2000	Didier Tarquin	Christophe Arleston	Soleil	Pepic and Kraus Publishing	
Lanfeust of the Stars	8	2001–2008	Didier Tarquin	Christophe Arleston	Soleil		
Largo Winch	21	1990 - ...	Philippe Francq	Jean Van Hamme	Dupuis	Cinebook	
Léonard	38	1977 - ...	Turk	Bob de Groot	Dargaud and Le Lombard	Dargaud	
Litteul Kévin ^{(FR)}	7	1993 - ...	Coyote	Coyote	Fluide Glacial		
Lone Sloane	9	1966 - ...	Philippe Druillet	Philippe Druillet	Losfeld, Dargaud, Les Humanoïdes Associés, and Albin Michel	NBM Publishing and Heavy Metal Magazine	
Lucky Luke	82	1946 - ...	Morris, Achdé	René Goscinny, Laurent Gerra	Dupuis, Dargaud and Lucky Comics	Cinebook, Brockhampton Press, Knight Books, Fantasy Flight Publishing, Dargaud, Ravette Books and Glo'Worm	
Luc Orient	18	1967–1994	Eddy Paape	Greg	Le Lombard		
Marc Dacier ^{(FR)}	13	1960–1982	Eddy Paape	Jean-Michel Charlier	Dupuis		
Marsupilami	31	1987 - ...	André Franquin and Batem	Greg, Yann le Pennetier and Colman	Marsu Productions		
Mélusine	27	1995 - ...	Clarke	François Gilson	Dupuis	Humanoids Publishing	
Metabarons	8	1992–2003	Juan Giménez	Alejandro Jodorowsky	Les Humanoïdes Associés	Humanoids Publishing and DC Comics	
Michel Vaillant	70	1959 - ...	Jean Graton	Jean Graton	Le Lombard, Editions Graton	Studio Graton	
Modeste et Pompon		1955–1988	André Franquin, Mitteï and Dino Attanasio	Greg, André Franquin, Mitteï and Dino Attanasio	Le Lombard		
Natacha	23	1971 - ...	François Walthéry	Maurice Tillieux, Peyo and Mitteï	Dupuis and Marsu Productions		
Nero	164	1951–2002	Marc Sleen	Marc Sleen	Het Volk, Standaard Uitgeverij		
The Nikopol Trilogy	3	1980–1993	Enki Bilal	Enki Bilal	Les Humoïdes Associés	Humanoids Publishing and Catalan Communications	
Nino ^{(NL)}	3	1989 - ...	Dirk Stallaert	Hec Leemans	Le Lombard		
Okko	10	2005 - ...	Hub	Hub	Delcourt	Archaia Studios Press	
Olivier Rameau ^{(FR)}	12	1970–2005	Dany	Greg	Le Lombard		
Papyrus	30	1974 - ...	Lucien De Gieter	Lucien De Gieter	Dupuis	Cinebook	
La Patrouille des Castors	30	1955–1993	Mitacq	Jean-Michel Charlier	Dupuis		
Peter Pan ^{(FR)}	6	1990–2004	Régis Loisel	Régis Loisel	Vents d'Ouest	Heavy Metal Magazine	
Les Petits Hommes ^{(FR)}	48	1974 - ...	Pierre Seron	Pierre Seron	Dupuis and Soleil		
Le Petit Spirou	14	1990 - ...	Tome	Janry	Dupuis		
Philémon	15	1972–1987	Fred	Fred	Dargaud		
Piet Pienter en Bert Bibber	45	1955 - 1995	Pom	Pom	Het Handelsblad, Gazet van Antwerpen		
Plunk	3	2007 -	Luc Cromheecke	Laurent Letzer	Dupuis		
Les 4 As ^{(FR)}	43	1964 - ...	François Craenhals	Georges Chaulet	Casterman		
La Quête de l'oiseau du temps	6	1993 - ...	Régis Loisel	Serge Le Tendre	Dargaud		
Quick and Flupke	12	1930–1940	Hergé	Hergé	Casterman	Mammoth Publishing and Eurokids IPL	
Rahan	22+9	1969 - ...	André Chéret	Roger Lecureux and Jean-François Lecureux	Soleil		
Redbeard	35	1959 - ...	Victor Hubinon, Jijé	Jean-Michel Charlier	Dargaud		
Red Ears	25	1990-...	Dany and many others	Dany and many others	De Boemerang B.V.		
Ric Hochet	78	1963 - ...	Tibet	André-Paul Duchâteau	Le Lombard		
Robin Dubois ^{(FR)}	21	1974 - ...	Turk	Bob de Groot	Dargaud and Le Lombard		
De Rode Ridder	267	1959 - ...	Willy Vandersteen, Karel Biddeloo and Claus Scholz	Willy Vandersteen, Karel Biddeloo and Martin Lodewijk	Standaard Uitgeverij		
Rork	7	1984–1993	Andreas	Andreas	Le Lombard	NBM Publishing	
Rubrique-à-Brac	5	1970–1974	Marcel Gotlieb	Marcel Gotlieb	Dargaud		
La Sagesse des mythes	18	2016 - ...	Didier Poli (artistic director)	Luc Ferry and Clotilde Bruneau	Glénat Editions		
Sam ^{(NL)}	9	1990 - ...	Jan Bosschaert	Marc Legendre	Standaard Uitgeverij		
Sammy	39	1972 - ...	Berck and Jean-Pol	Raoul Cauvin	Dupuis		
Samson en Gert ^{(NL)}	33	1993–2005	Jean-Pol and Wim Swerts	Danny Verbiest, Gert Verhulst and Hans Bourlon	Studio 100		
Le Scorpion	13	2000 - ...	Enrico Marini	Stephen Desberg	Dargaud	Cinebook	
Scrameustache	38	1972 - ...	Gos	Gos	Dupuis		
Sibylline ^{(FR)}	15	1967 - ...	Raymond Macherot and André Taymans	Raymond Macherot	Dupuis and Flouzemaker		
Simon du Fleuve	9	1976–1989	Claude Auclair	Claude Auclair	Dargaud		
The Smurfs	39	1963 - ...	Peyo	Peyo	Dupuis		
Soda	12	1986 - ...	Luc Warnant and Bruno Gazzotti	Tome	Dupuis		
Sophie ^{(FR)}	20	1968 - ...	Jidéhem	Jidéhem	Dupuis		
The Spiffy Adventures of McConey	10	1991–2004	Lewis Trondheim	Lewis Trondheim	L'Association and Dargaud	Fantagraphics	
Spike and Suzy (also known as Willy and Wanda and Bob and Bobette)	413	1946 - ...	Willy Vandersteen	Willy Vandersteen	Standaard Uitgeverij	Hiddigeigei Books, Ravette Books and Intes International	
Spirou & Fantasio	56	1950 -	Rob-Vel, Jijé, André Franquin, Tome and Janry, and José-Luis Munuera	Rob-Vel, Jijé, André Franquin, Tome and Janry, and Jean-David Morvan	Dupuis	Fantasy Flight Publishing and Egmont Publishing	
Superdupont	6	1977 - ...	Marcel Gotlieb	Jacques Lob	Fluide Glacial		
Tanguy et Laverdure	27	1961 - ...	Albert Uderzo and Jijé	Jean-Michel Charlier	Dargaud, Hachette and Novedi		
Les Technopères ^{(FR)}	8	1998 - ...	Zoran Janjetov	Alejandro Jodorowsky	Les Humanoïdes Associés	Humanoids Publishing	
Théodore Poussin	12	1987–2005	Frank Le Gall	Frank Le Gall	Dupuis		
Thorgal	40	1980 - ...	Grzegorz Rosinski	Jean van Hamme and Yves Sente	Le Lombard	Donning Company and Cinebook	
Tif et Tondu	47	1954–1997	Fernand Dineur and Will	Fernand Dineur, Maurice Rosy, Maurice Tillieux, Will and Stephen Desberg	Dupuis		
The Adventures of Tintin	24	1929–1986	Hergé	Hergé	Casterman	Methuen Publishing, Little Brown and Company and Egmont Publishing	
Titeuf	11	1993 - ...	Zep	Zep	Glénat	Pepic and Kraus Publishing	
Trolls of Troy	11	1997 - ...	Jean-Louis Mourier	Christophe Arleston	Soleil		
Les Tuniques Bleues	66	1972 - ...	Lambil	Raoul Cauvin	Dupuis	Reney Editions and Cinebook	
Universal War One and Universal War Two	6	1998–2018	Denis Bajram	Denis Bajram	Quadrant Solaire	Marvel	
Urbanus^{(NL)}	201	1982 - 2022	Willy Linthout	Willy Linthout and Urbanus	Standaard Uitgeverij		
Valérian and Laureline	22	1970 - ...	Jean-Claude Mézières	Pierre Christin	Dargaud	Dargaud, Fantasy Flight Publishing and iBooks	
Vertongen & Co ^{(NL)}	30	2011 - ...	Luc Van Asten and Wim Swerts	Hec Leemans	Standaard Uitgeverij		
Le Vieux Nick et Barbe-Noire ^{(FR)}	26	1960–1985	Marcel Remacle	Marcel Remacle	Dupuis		
W817 ^{(NL)}	26	2003–2011	Luc Van Asten and Wim Swerts	Hec Leemans and Tom Bouden	Standaard Uitgeverij		
Wake (Sillage)	11+1+6+5+2	1998 - ...	Philippe Buchet	Jean-David Morvan	Delcourt	NBM Publishing	
XIII	27	1984–2007	William Vance	Jean Van Hamme	Dargaud	Catalan Communications and Marvel	
Yakari	42	1977 - ...	Derib	Job	Casterman	Cinebook	
Yoko Tsuno	30	1972 - ...	Roger Leloup	Roger Leloup	Dupuis	Catalan Communications and Cinebook	
Ythaq: The Forsaken World ^{(FR)}	16	2005 - ...	Adrien Floch	Christophe Arleston	Soleil	Marvel	
Zig et Puce	23	1927–1970	Alain Saint-Ogan and Greg	Alain Saint-Ogan and Greg	Glénat		

== See also ==
- List of films based on French-language comics
- List of TV series based on French-language comics
