= Astérix et ses Amis =

- Cover of the French edition
- Date: 2007
- Main characters: Asterix and Obelix
- Series: Asterix
- Publisher: Les Editions Albert René

Creative team
- Writers: various
- Artists: various

Original publication
- Language: French

Astérix et ses amis (English: Asterix and his Friends) is a tribute volume published in 2007 by Les Editions Albert René. The full original title is Astérix et ses Amis – Hommage à Albert Uderzo ("Asterix and his friends – homage to Albert Uderzo""). It was released to pay tribute to Albert Uderzo, for his 80th birthday. Not part of the original Asterix series, it is made up of several short stories drawn and written by various renowned comics artists.

== Content ==
There are 34 short stories, often featuring both characters from the Asterix series and heroes created by each artist.

- René Loustal (Le Sang des voyous, White Sonia, Jolie mer de Chine)
- Juanjo Guarnido (Blacksad)
- Midam (Kid Paddle)
- Arleston & Mourier (Trolls of Troy)
- Zep (Titeuf)
- Vance & Van Hamme (XIII)
- François Boucq (Bouche du Diable)
- Baru (Quéquette blues, L’Autoroute du soleil, Sur la route encore, Bonne année, L’Enragé)
- Rosiński & Van Hamme (Thorgal)
- Milo Manara (Un été indien, El Gaucho, Voyage à Tulum, Le Voyage de G. Mastorna)
- Turf (La Nef des fous)
- Walthéry (Natacha)
- Laudec & Cauvin (Cédric)
- Achdé & Gerra (Lucky Luke)
- Beltran (Le Ventre du Minotaure, Technopères, Mégalex)
- Carrère (Léo Loden, Private Ghost)
- Brösel (Werner)
- Jidéhem (Gaston Lagaffe)
- Dany (Olivier Rameau)
- Cuzor (Black Jack, Quintett)
- Immonen (Superman)
- Tibet (Ric Hochet)
- Vicar (Donald Duck)
- Jean Graton (Michel Vaillant)
- Derib (Yakari, Buddy Longway)
- Batem (Marsupilami)
- Forges (El País)
- David Lloyd (V for Vendetta)
- Henk Kuijpers (Franka)
- Tarquin & Arleston (Lanfeust of Troy)

== Languages ==
- Asterix e seus Amigos (Brazilian Portuguese) Record
- Astèrix i els seus Amics (Catalan) Salvat
- Asterix en zijn vrienden (Dutch) Editions Albert René
- Asterix ja ystävät (Finnish) Egmont Kustannus OY AB
- Astérix et ses Amis (French) Editions Albert René
- Asterix und seine Freunde (German) Egmont Ehapa Verlag Berlin
- Ο Αστερίξ και οι Φίλοι του (Greek) Μαμούθ Κόμιξ
- Asterixks i Przyjaciele (Polish) Egmont Sp
- Astérix y sus Amigos (Spanish) Salvat
- Asterix e os seus Amigos (European Portuguese) ASA

== See also ==
- List of Asterix volumes
