= Cheval noir =

Cheval noir (french: cheval = horse, noir = black) can refer to:

- Horses with a black coat.
- A legend from Quebec (See French Wikipedia: Cheval noir)
- Cheval Noir (mountain), a mountain in the French Alps
- Cheval Noir unit, a geologic unit in the French Alps
- Cheval Noir (comics), a comics anthology
