= Lanfeust Quest =

French comic series

Lanfeust Quest is a French comics series version of the adventures of Lanfeust. Written in Japanese reading direction, small format, black and white and a lot more distinctive style, this revised version of Lanfeust of Troy is illustrated by Ludo Lullabi.

== Characters ==
- Lanfeust: Very dissatisfied with his ability to be able to melt metal, Lanfeust dreams of being a hero. One day in contact with some ivory sword pommel, he discovered an absolute power.
- C'ian: Nicolède's elder daughter, but primarily girlfriend of Lanfeust. She acquires “after dark”, the power of healing.
- Cixi: Nicolède's younger daughter. She can transform water into ice or steam.
- Nicolède: The village elder of Glinin. He will guide Lanfeust, that scholars of Eckmül can study at leisure.
- Hébus
- The Knight Or-Azur: Coming of the Baron, he has the sword that gives Lanfeust his absolute power.

== Tomes ==
=== Volume 1 ===
ISBN 2-30200-028-5 Released in December 2007

- Chapter 01: Trolle meeting
- Chapter 02: A wonderful gift
- Chapter 03: The King of the forge
- Chapter 04: Cixi devil
- Chapter 05: A disarmed knight
- Chapter 06: The Power of Lanfeust
- Chapter 07: The wisdom of Nicolède
- Chapter 08: The great departure
- Chapter 09: The Last Stand

=== Volume 2 ===
ISBN 2-30200-117-6 Released in June 2008

- Chapter 10: Troll hit
- Chapter 11: Traps
- Chapter 12: It will hurt!
- Chapter 13: Spider Villain
- Chapter 14: Mind-blowing
- Chapter 15: Wet to death
- Chapter 16: Jaclare here we are!
- Chapter 17: It was not included
- Chapter 18: Should I stay or should I go?

=== Volume 3 ===
ISBN 978-2-302-00322-4 Released in January 2009

- Chapter 19: Battle in the sun
- Chapter 20: Teamwork
- Chapter 21: The animal rights
- Chapter 22: Nicolède decides
- Chapter 23: A day too
- Chapter 24: Dawn and the dust
- Chapter 25: The head against attack
- Chapter 26: Dark Troll
- Chapter 27: The plan Torll

=== Volume 4 ===
ISBN 2-30200-634-8 Released in July 2009

- Chapter 28: Trolls trolls versus
- Chapter 29: Village cardboard
- Chapter 30: Tartar Fazou
- Chapter 31: Fight Heads
- Chapter 32: The Fall of Heroes
- Chapter 33: The Breath of Magohamoth
- Chapter 34: Tornado metal
- Chapter 35: The big face to face

=== Volume 5 ===
ISBN 978-2-302-00893-9 Released in January 2010

- Chapter 36: A rude awakening
- Chapter 37: The son of the wind
- Chapter 38: Troll delighted
- Chapter 39: The high seas
- Chapter 40: Deep Sea Fishing
- Chapter 41: Cixi and frozen octopus
- Chapter 42 squads Doriane
- Chapter 43: Eckmül

== Review ==
- "Intended for a wider market, this version only hang Humor is less present, the baddest and the presence hero 's Hébus is almost anecdotal Critics see it as a marketing release ....
... changes to the specifics of the format make it a 'next' interesting for those who love this series / world which is well developed ...."

- "Lanfeust Quest is not a simple transposition of the Franco-Belgian series Lanfeust of Troy Manga. While the original frame remains but Arleston and Ludo Lullabi achieve perfect adaptation taking into account the specificities of support ...."

- "... Definitely adapting Lanfeust manga format is a success that we look forward to continuing to read."

- "... The authors now seem to have finished their moult transition to manga, adapting happily to the codes of shounen, that fits the character of Lanfeust and his little band ...."

- "... It must be said, the drawings are superb. Ludo Lullabi mastered his designs perfectly and the new character designs are a success. not a single panel is sloppy and the rendering is very dynamic ...."

== Adaptation ==
Lanfeust Quest
- Directed by: Antoine Charreyron; Tarik Hamdine
- Theme music composer: Klaus Badelt
- Composer: Mark Yaeger
- Countries of origin: France; India
- Original language: French
- No. of episodes: 26

Production
- Executive producers: Pierre Belaisch; Gaelle Guiny
- Running time: 23 minutes
- Production companies: Gaumont Animation; Gaumont Television; DQ Entertainment; Cofinova 23; Devanim; Backup Media; Dapaco Productions

Original release
- Network: M6; Canal J
- Release: September 25, 2013 – 2014

In 2011, it was revealed that Gaumont Animation was developing a 26-episode animated television series based on the comics for M6. The following year, India's DQ Entertainment agreed to co-produce the show. Canal J joined as a broadcast partner that June. In France, M6 premiered the series September 25, 2013, followed by Canal J's broadcast on March 1, 2014, and sister channel Gulli on January 4, 2016.

Australia's ABC3 began airing an English version on July 11, 2014. That same month, Disney Channels Worldwide acquired the series for broadcast in Germany, Spain, Turkey, Italy, the Netherlands, Belgium, Poland, the Middle East and Africa. The show has also aired on Portugal's Biggs, Singapore's Okto and Spain's Clan.

== See also ==
=== Related articles ===
- Lanfeust of Troy
- Lanfeust Star
- Trolls of Troy
- Universe Troy
