= Franco-Belgian comics publishing houses =

Belgium and France have a long tradition in comics and comic books (bandes dessinées) with some shared history in comics and publishing houses.

== History ==
The first important publishers of bandes dessinées started producing comics magazines and books in the 1930s and 1940s, especially in Belgium, with Casterman, Dargaud, Dupuis and Le Lombard as the most famous ones.

From the 1970s and the "adult" turn of the comics, new publishing houses rose, especially in France, like Les Humanoïdes Associés, Glénat and Delcourt.

In the 1990s, several new small independent publishers emerged, such as l'Association, Amok, and Fréon. While some of these new publishers gained popular success and succeeded in creating a new look in their comics, others kept a more intransigent approach. In recent decades, many independent publishers have been restructured. While keeping their brand names, most of them have been bought, included or gathered in larger conglomerates, such as Média-Participations.

== Selected Franco-Belgian publishers ==
- 12 bis
- Actes Sud
- Albin-Michel
- Ankama
- L'Association
- Bamboo Édition
- Carabas
- Casterman
- Dargaud
- Delcourt
- Le Dernier Cri
- Dupuis
- Ego comme X
- Fluide Glacial
- Frémok and its predecessors Amok and Fréon
- Futuropolis
- Glénat
- Les Humanoïdes Associés
- Éditions Joker
- Le Lombard
- Lug
- Mosquito
- Les Requins-Marteaux
- Semic
- Soleil
- Standaard Uitgeverij
- Vents d'Ouest

== See also ==
- List of Franco-Belgian comics series
- List of manga distributors
