= Cheval Noir (comics) =

1989–1994 anthology comic book

- The cover to Cheval Noir #26 (1992). Art by Moebius.

Publication information
- Publisher: Dark Horse Comics
- Schedule: Monthly
- Format: Ongoing series
- Publication date: December 1989 – January 1994
- No. of issues: 50
- Editor(s): Mike Richardson, Barbara Kesel, Anina Bennett, Jennie Bricker

Cheval Noir (French translation of Black Horse) was a black-and-white anthology comic book published between 1989 and 1994 by Dark Horse Comics. First edited by Dark Horse founder Mike Richardson, Cheval Noir aimed to showcase the best work by international creators to the English-speaking audience.

== Publication history ==
During its 50 issue run, Cheval Noir was published in a variety of formats ranging from the standard 32-pages to giant-sized 72-page issues. The first 23 issues were edited by Mike Richardson, then the role was taken over by Barbara Kesel and later by Anina Bennett and Jennie Bricker.

Besides many stand-alone short comics, the anthology featured chapters from Jacques Tardi's The Extraordinary Adventures of Adèle Blanc-Sec, David Lynch's The Angriest Dog in the World, an adaptation of Joe Haldeman's The Forever War by Marvano, Andreas' Rork, Masashi Tanaka's Demon, François Schuiten and Benoît Peeters' The Obscure Cities, Jean-Michel Charlier and Moebius' Blueberry.
