= Sky Doll =

Comic Magazine

Sky Doll is an Italian comic book series first published in 2000, by Alessandro Barbucci and Barbara Canepa, who also collaborated on W.I.T.C.H. and Monster Allergy; Sky Doll features a more "adult" story and a departure from pure fantasy to a more science-fiction aesthetic. Religion and science fiction, as well as the power of the mass media, are important themes of the story.

The series consists of four volumes, as well as a sketchbook published by Carlsen Comics. The first three volumes have also been released in an English-language version by Marvel Comics in collaboration with Soleil Productions.

== Story ==
The action is set in a fictitious parallel universe, in which the papacies of Agape (representing spiritual love) and Lodovica (Ludovica, or Ludowika, depending on the language, and representing sexual love) fall into a conflict, resulting in the banishment of Agape and the creation of a dystopia in which both spiritual and sexual freedoms have been perverted. With Agape's followers labeled as heretics, Lodovica rules the galaxy through extensive control of the mass media, using "miracles" to impress the fanatical populace. The main character is Noa, a so-called Sky Doll: a lifelike android without rights, resembling a young female, who exists only to serve the state's desires. Noa meets two "missionaries", and with their help escapes from its tyrannical master. Unknown to Lodovica, it accompanies the thoughtful, naive Roy and distrustful Jahu on their interstellar mission to uproot the growing "heretic" religion on the planet Aqua, which soon develops into something much more. Eventually, mysterious powers seem to suggest Noa is more than just an ordinary robot.

== Characters ==
=== Protagonists ===
- Noa: a Sky Doll with a mysterious destiny who seems to have some connection with the banned Agape. Unlike the other mechanized dolls, she possesses an oscillating personality and powers yet to be discovered. She has no problems making friends with Roy, but seems to have a bit more trouble with Jahu.
- Roy: a young idealist and papal emissary. At first beginning the mission with enthusiasm, the trials of their journey may transform him into a cynical and rebellious individual.
- Jahu: long-time servant of the Lodovic system, Jahu has a history of ambition, despite his demonstration of humanity by admitting his betrayal to Roy.

=== Religious Figures ===
- Lodovica: the power-mad ruler who strives to keep the faith of the populace through any means possible, whether by creating the illusion of divine power or by distracting them with the erotica of the Sky Dolls.
- Agape: the representation of spiritual love, whose very memory Lodovica seeks to erase forever.
- The Miracolatore (the Miracle Genie): the genius behind the miracles of Lodovica, which are in reality little more than a television show for an impressionable audience. All the bishops and high priests are convinced he exists only to glorify their leader, but in reality he is a fervent supporter of Agape and waits for the day when Agape's rebels will come out of the underground and overthrow the government.
- Gaia: the spiritual leader of a population consisting entirely of the female sex, the denizens of the Aqua planet. She is the foundation of a religion that is expanding at high velocity all over the galaxy (allusions are drawn to Scientology) and presents a threat to Lodovica's authority. Lodovica sends Roy and Jahu (with Noa secretly in tow) to Aqua to destroy the Sacred Fish, source of life for the Aquarians, and thus putting a stop to the dangerous heresy.

=== Others ===
- Frida Decibel: celebrity television personality, host of a talk show on channel TriniTeevee (play on the words Trinity , trinità, and TV ) and official mouthpiece of the Church of Lodovica. Her show is actually a subversive tool in which a good part of the staff are "heretics", to whom she gives sanctuary without fear of being caught – her show is, after all, all for the glory of Lodovica.
- Cleopatra Decibel: the daughter of Frida, she acts much older than she truly is – though her age is never stated, her caretaker points out that she is a minor. Cleopatra no secrecy of her laziness and unwillingness to be a part of her mother's telecasts. The self-proclaimed "biggest fan" of Jahu, she gains his attention by forcing their meeting, then performing a dance routine for the television inspired by Rose (Jahu's missing ex-wife).
- Eliantho (Elianthe): a "scropo (Scrope)", or a fictional animal race present in the world of Sky Doll. The scropi are small, hairy quadrupeds with large noses. Eliantho, Noa's domesticated pet, sacrifices itself to a laser blast intended for Roy and Jahu. Through unknown means, Noa is able to resurrect it. It also seems to have more untapped power within it.
- Aquarian Caretaker: as of Tome 3 (White City), she is yet unnamed. However, she is the one most frequently dealing with Cleopatra, seen in her attempts to ready Cleo for the major telecast. She remains her position even as Cleopatra gravitates towards Jahu, stopping them from kissing and reminding them of her youth. No indication is given that she cares that the Aquarians are now a doomed race, despite her working in the telecast celebrating it. Also, while the Aquarians all look identical (except for Gaia, who has notable blue arms apparently made from water), her time on the station has given her a look, through facial expressions and clothing choice, pointing to Chinese culture.

== Sky Doll: Spaceship Collection (2010) ==
A collection of six short stories that serve as a prequel to the main story and giving Noa a slightly expanded backstory. The collection, each story featuring a different artist, explore some of the many jobs that Noa had before the events of the Skydoll miniseries, including a cow farmer, a taxi driver, and a dominatrix. Released by Marvel in two parts as part of their Soleil series. Each of the stories seem to be named after songs.

=== Volume One ===
- La Bambola - Written by Barbara Canepa - Art by Matteo De Longis

While inside the Doll Factory, Noa tries futilely to save another doll who is scheduled for destruction.

- Bang Bang - Written by Alessandro Barbucci - Art by Claudio Acciari

Noa's misadventures working as a cow farmer. Possibly named after the song "Bang Bang (My Baby Shot Me Down)"

- Voodoo Child - Written by Alessandro Barbucci and Barbara Canepa - Art by Pierre-Mony Chan

While working at a bordello/bar, Noa gets involved with a doll's secret plan to use voodoo rites to become human. Probably named after the Jimi Hendrix song "Voodoo Child (Slight Return)".

=== Volume Two ===
- Lady Cub Driver - Written by Alessandro Barbucci and Barbara Canepa - Art by Riff Reb's

Noa works as a taxi driver and has a misadventure involving a holy artifact stolen by a dog. Perhaps named for the Prince song "Lady Cab Driver."

- Like a Virgin - Written by Alessandro Barbucci - Art by Bengal

Noa is worshiped from afar by a young man as she works as a dominatrix, servicing a group of Bishops dressed as Papess Lodovica. Most likely named after the Madonna hit "Like a Virgin".

- Smoke on the Water - Written by Alessandro Barbucci - Art by Canepa

Serving as a direct prequel to the Sky Doll miniseries, Noa is forced to endure a surreal cartoonish dimension while on a mission to retrieve her boss God's crown. Most likely named after the Deep Purple rock song "Smoke on the Water".

== Lacrima Christi Collection (2010) ==
Cult extravagant series, where in 'epilogue' pages Archivum Secretum some of the invited artists like Enrique Fernandez expressed their fear if their pieces would be too daring for publishing Two volumes feature six fragments of the lives of Agape and Lodovica, first is drawn by Barbucci & Canepa, and the rest by five different artists invited by the original authors.

=== Volume One ===
- In The Mirror - Alessandro Barbucci and Barbara Canepa (Italy)
- The Saint in a bottle - Mikael Bourgoin (France)
- Sleeping Dreamer - Benjamin (China)

=== Volume Two ===
- The Papess's New Clothes - Gradimir Smudja (Serbia)
- Blood Red Shoes - Afif Khaled (France)
- White Cinderella - Enrique Fernandez (Spain)

== Sudra (August 2017) ==
Four sequels of the main story on android monster-girl Noa, published in English by Titan Comics (2017). Collection in hard cover was released on August 22, 2017. In it, the heroine who escaped sexual enslavement fate she shared with her “sisters”, becomes street preacher in a planet whose name Sudra - the lowest social category in Indian system of caste - indicates the authors are merging their shiny manga-like world with the rest of 'worn-out future' pieces characteristic for European Sci-Fi since Humanoids took over the genre back in the 1970-es.

== Themes ==
The depiction of the interaction between religion and power is described quite cynically. The miracles which are achieved by the Pope Lodovica are in reality produced by illusion or during television transmission, and do not depict the power-hungry leader as she really is. The aquatic religion is in reality an esoteric New Age chain store/spa, which is out to sell their products under the guise of bringing welfare through its profits.

The sexuality of the comic is another recurring motif. The erotic nature of the character designs and depiction of female bodies are generously represented; this is expressed conversely in details such as the Sacred Fish character in volume two. However at the same time themes of sexual repression are strongly prevalent, Noa herself a product of a sexually predatory society, and the comedic elements of the story are often harshly juxtaposed with the sexually abusive landscape.

== Art styles ==
The look of the comic is influenced by various art and architectural styles. For example, the buildings and clothing on the Lodovica's world resemble the Baroque period, while the ornamentation on planet Aqua is reminiscent of 60's and 70's psychedelia.

== Volumes ==
- Chapter 0: Doll's Factory , short prequel + "making-of" vol. 1 + Art Book (2002)
- Chapter 1: The Yellow City (2000)
- Chapter 2: Aqua (2002)
- Chapter 3: The White City (2006)
- Chapter 4: Sudra (2017)
- SpaceShip collection #1
- Lacrima Christi collection #2

== Sky Doll: Decade 00>10 (2016) ==
- Includes the first three instalments of Noa's story - (Chapter 1: The Yellow City (2000), Chapter 2: Aqua (2002), Chapter 3: The White City (2006))
- The prologue - Chapter 0: Doll's Factory
- The short story - Heaven's Dolls
- A gallery of illustrations from various artists inspired by the beauty of the Sky Doll universe - Homages
- 232 pages total

== Publishers ==
- Marvel Comics : chapters 0 to 3 + SpaceShip & Lacrima Christi – English Edition (only for N.A.).
- Titan Comics : chapter 4 + Sky Doll: Decade 00>10 – English Edition
- Soleil Productions : chapters 0 to 4 + SpaceShip & Lacrima Christi – French Edition (original publisher)
- Pavesio Editions chapters 0 to 3 – Italian Edition (Original version)
- Carlsen Comics : chapters 0 to 3 – German Edition
- Silvester Strips : chapters 1 to 4 – Dutch Edition
- Norma Editorial : chapters 0 to 3 – Spanish Edition + Spaceship Collection Chapter 01
- Vitamina BD : chapters 1 to 3 – Portuguese Edition
- System Comics : chapters 1 to 3 – Serbian Edition
- Faraos Cigarer : chapters 1 to 3 – Danish Edition
- Egmont : chapters 1 to 3 – Polish Edition
- Artline Studios : chapters 1 to 4 – Bulgarian Edition
- XL Media : chapters 0 to 2 + "making-of" vol. 1 + Homages – Russian Edition
