= Worlds of Aldebaran =

Series of comics

Aldebaran
- The first book in the series The Catastrophe

Publication information
- Publisher: Dargaud (French); Cinebook (English)
- Format: Graphic novel
- Genre: Science fiction
- No. of issues: 28 (in French); 22 (in English)

Creative team
- Written by: Léo
- Artist(s): Léo

The Worlds of Aldebaran (French: Les Mondes d'Aldébaran) is a French science-fiction comic series written and illustrated by Léo and published by Dargaud in French and Cinebook in English. The Aldebaran saga is divided into 7 cycles: Aldebaran and its sequels Betelgeuse, Antares, Survivors, Return to Aldebaran, Neptune and Bellatrix. Each cycle is composed of two to six albums, and each corresponds to a different planet. Although it is possible to read the cycles separately, they are chronological to form a coherent whole. Each cycle (and thus planet) introduces new secondary characters, although the central heroes of the story remain constant.

2011 saw the release of a new volume, Survivors (French: Survivants), which introduced a new set of characters and takes place concurrently with Antares. The next cycle, Return to Aldebaran (French: Retour sur Aldébaran) consists of 3 albums, published between 2018 and 2020. It is followed in 2022 with Neptune and in 2023 with Bellatrix.

The series has been translated into several languages, including Italian, German, Dutch, Polish, Portuguese, Croatian, Spanish, Czech and English.

== Plot ==
=== Situation before Aldebaran ===
During the 21st century, following global warming, which resulted in the deviation of the Gulf Stream, an increase in pollution levels, and devastating religious wars, the conditions on Earth seriously degraded. Concurrently, huge technological advances were made for Humanity, particularly the invention of the "Benevides Transfer", which allows faster-than-light space travel. As a result, new Earth-like planets, potentially colonisable, were discovered.

Millions of dollars have been invested in these colonization projects by private companies. The first to inhabit the new colonies are selected following reconnaissance missions to the newly discovered planets, and the United Nations has put in place a charter regulating the colonization of new planets. Most notably, colonization must cease should the planet be found to harbor one, or potentially several species considered to be evolved, defined as a species which has discovered fire and can produce tools.

=== The Aldebaran Cycle ===
The first cycle opens towards the end of the 22nd century on the first planet successfully colonized by humanity, Aldebaran-4 (commonly known simply as Aldebaran), the fourth planet of the Aldebaran solar system and the only discovered to be hospitable. It is revealed that since its colonization 100 years previous, communication with Earth has been impossible, the reason for which is not explained. As a result, the colonists have had to put in place an autocratic society, making do with what is available to them on the planet. The original population of 3,000 colonists rapidly grows to around 20,000 inhabitants when the cycle begins.

The story begins in the year 2179 with the complete destruction of a small fishing village north of Bigland island, known as Arena Bianca, by a mysterious and voracious sea creature. The entire population is killed in the attack with the exception of three teenagers, Mark Sorensen, Kim Keller and Nellie Keller, left orphaned following the disaster. Mark and Kim decide to head for the capital of the colony, Anatolia, several thousand kilometers to the south, hoping to earn a living. The two decide to elucidate the mystery of the killer animal that devastated their village upon meeting Driss Shediac and Alexa Komarova, two friendly and experienced biologists who are actively hunted by the police. In the course of their adventures, it is revealed that the central government of Aldebaran is authoritarian and dictatorial. The two teenagers also meet the opportunistic Mister Pad, a mischievous vagabond, who offers to help them as long as he gets something from the deal as well.

Alexa and Driss eventually decide to form a secret group composed of Kim, Mark, Mister Pad, as well as several of their friends who are aware of their secret: the Mantris, a complex, protean creature, and the same which annihilated Kim and Mark's village, does in fact, under certain forms, enter into amicable contact with humans, having them absorb life-prolonging capsules, in the hopes of establishing a symbiotic relationship. Alexa and Driss have been absorbing these capsules for some time while continuing their research into the creature, and they propose that the other members of the group begin absorbing the capsules as well. The Mantris Group is born.

The government eventually catches up with the group, but it is saved by the Mantris, which simply makes the intruders vanish. Shortly afterwards, Kim and Mark see a space shuttle in the sky, which turns out to be the first contact between Earth and Aldebaran, made possible when the computers suddenly and miraculously begin to function again. The colonial government is dissolved and commerce and travel begins with Earth; Mark and Kim, now a couple, decide to leave Aldebaran and make for Earth in order to continue their studies. Driss and Alexa found the Institute for the Study of the Mantris, funded largely with Earth-based assistance.

=== The Betelgeuse Cycle ===
Just as communications are re-established with Earth on Aldebaran, another vessel, the Konstantin Tsiolkowsky, heads for a newly discovered habitable planet, Betelgeuse-6 (commonly referred to as Betelgeuse), the sixth and only viable planet of the Betelgeuse planetary system. Although having no connection with the Aldebaran project, the same nightmarish scenario develops, and again all communication with Earth is lost, due to an unidentifiable computer virus. After losing contact, a small party (around 100 people) make for the planet's surface, but they in turn lose contact with the shuttle remaining in orbit. Meanwhile, this same shuttle progressively falls victim to the cold of space following the breakdown of the onboard radiators, and all 3,000 colonists on board, in a state of hibernation since their departure from Earth, are killed. The remaining shuttle crew, finding themselves in a hopeless situation, commit suicide.

The Betelgeuse Cycle begins six years after these events, with Kim and Mark, now adults, having spent these years living on Earth. Kim, having obtained a diploma in biology, decides to return to Aldebaran without Mark, as their relationship has come to a standstill. Alexa welcomes Kim upon her arrival and invites her to take part in a rescue mission to Betelgeuse. Alexa is further motivated by her findings, with Driss, that the Mantris has been in regular contact with Betelgeuse, and that further information might be gleaned by undertaking a mission there. Furthermore, Driss believes it possible that the ruptures in communications are brought about by the Mantris.

Kim agrees to make the trip, feeling that it could be a decisive moment in her life, and a week later is en route to Betelgeuse, accompanied by Colonel Wong and Lieutenant Steve Hudson; the group is soon joined by Inge and Hector, miraculous survivors of the Konstantin Tsiolkowky disaster, whom they meet on board the ill-fated ship. Unfortunately, the destructive virus is transmitted to the group's vessel as well. Finding themselves isolated from Aldebaran, the group decides to undertake a mission to the planet's surface.

The group quickly learns that two opposing groups have formed on the planet. Most of the survivors have settled on the side of a cliff, in a society marked by strict rules and military discipline, thus forming the canyon group. The second, led by the ex-commander of the Konstantin Tsiolkowky, extremely remorseful after losing control of the vessel she was supposed to command, is known as the desert group. The two groups are engaged in a dispute over the native lifeforms of the planet, the iums, as to whether these animals are intelligent enough to abandon the project per the UN charter concerning colonization.

Kim, having taken over leadership of the rescue mission following the accidental death of Colonel Wong, decides to lead a team, composed of her ship's crew, as well as two representatives from each of the opposing groups, on a discovery mission through the canyon to learn more about the iums. Kim begins to feel uneasy concerning the canyon group due to its expedient methods, and tension rises within the team until, during a dispute, a member of the canyon group, George Dixon, accidentally shoots Kim in the stomach. Her body disappears into an underground river, and Hector, Steve and Inge embark upon a mission to save her, while the members of the two competing planetary factions, convinced she has not survived, return to their bases, unaware that the Mantris capsules Kim has been taking have given her unusual healing abilities.

The rescue team manages to save Kim from the caves, although Steve loses his life in the effort, and settles in a calm area for a period of two months. Kim meets an extraterrestrial, Sven, who is in fact a humanoid spy originally from the same planet as the Mantris and is stationed on Aldebaran. He becomes obsessed with Kim and decides to break the strict laws regarding his work and enter into a relationship with her. Kim and Sven become intimate, and she gleans important information regarding the Mantris from him. Once again amongst humans, Kim reveals what Sven taught her regarding the Mantriss (while at the same time hiding the fact that there was a relationship between the two): the Mantris did indeed create the computer virus, and is preparing to release a biological virus designed to infect humans it finds to be too aggressive. It becomes necessary to break camp, but Kim announces that the Mantris has agreed to allow a delegation of a small number of humans to remain on the planet as long as they agree to not attempt to recommence colonization efforts. The large-scale colonization of Betelgeuse is consequently abandoned.

=== The Antares Cycle ===
Antares begins with three people exploring Antares-5, in the Antares star system, who spot and record an animal slowly vanishing. They decide to send the film to Earth. On Earth, in Paris, Kim and a college friend June Oliseh, visit a zoo, containing the last living chimpanzee. Other visitors recognize her as they are leaving. She goes off to a taping of a daytime talk show. Later in New York, a group of executives of Forward Enterprises meet to discuss why Project Antares has stalled. They view the film from Antares-5. Faced with another possible catastrophe, they immediately suspend Project Antares. The talk show airs. Later, after discussion with Jedidiah, a religious man who intends to found a new society, Forward Enterprises decides to resume the colonisation effort, and keep the film top secret. They decide to use Kim to prop up their image, as she is currently in the media spotlight. Kim and June return to their apartment and watch an old film (2001: A Space Odyssey) Kim gets a message from Alexa, telling her the outcome of her trial. She received 15 years, Marc eight and Mr. Pad, who has fled, 10. The next day Leliah and her son Samir, who has her sign his cap, visit. Leliah has come to recruit her to go to Antares-5, as part of the colonization effort. She will be the captain of the Robert Goddard, ungraded and renamed from the Konstantin Tsiolkovsky. Kim and June later visit Mr. Thornton, who tries to further convince her, but she intends to return to Betelgeuse and set up an outpost. He offers to release and pardon her friends from prison if she goes, for the good of humanity. Against her better judgment, she agrees. Later, at dinner at the Eiffel Tower, she discusses her future. The next day, her pre-flight medical scan reveals that she is pregnant, despite not having had relations for quite some time.

On Antares-5, Salif intends to shoot an animal at a waterhole for dinner, when it is ambushed by a submerged predator. As it is eating, a third predator, a black, cloak-like thing covers them both. On the way back, he shoots a flying creature. Recovering it, Liang Mei is stung by a small mosquito-sized metal insect, with twin rotors. They put it in a specimen container, but after they return to base, they find that it has vanished from the bottle.

Two years later at the advance base on Betelgeuse, Alexa and Mark are greeted by Toshiro Matsuda. They ask about Kim, but are told that she has left, not feeling well after hear the end of her pregnancy. He offers to take them to see Maï Lan and Hector, now a couple, who live further down canyon. Maï Lan agrees to guide them to Kim, but only if Mr. Matsuda stays behind. He agrees, under protest, and they fly further down the canyon. Maï Lan tells Alexa that Kim is staying with Mr. Pad.

They land and walk to a house, where they find Kim in a small garden. She is glad to see them. But when they ask her why she stays there, she tells them it is because of her baby. When Mark asks who the father is, she reveal that is Sven, the alien she had a close encounter with. She then takes them to meet her. They are shocked when Lynn emerges from a still pool. She appears somewhat human, but has a fin on her back and ankles, gill slits on her sides, and vertical-pupiled eyes.

They are surprised that she and Sven could have had a child, being different races, and she says that she believes that the capsules provided by the Mantris altered her body. Lynn was a normal baby until six months, when she changed. Without Maï Lan and Hector, she would have become known as the mother of an aquatic child. Alexa and Mark agree not to tell anyone. Meanwhile, Maï Lan peels off her dress and plays in the water with Lynn. Later, Mr Pad invites them in for dinner. At the table they talk. Kim tells them about the Antares project. The main reason is that the planet has an abundance of scandium, an element that is worth far more than gold. She would like to go, and intends to bring Lynn along, which presents a problem. Just then, Maï Lan arrives and offers to come along and care for Lynn.

On Antares, Salif and Zao discuss what they will do when they return to Earth. They also talk about a strange creature that seem to have adopted them. They wonder if it might be intelligent. Mei intends to go swimming, but the creature has a reaction to something in the tall grass. Salif shoots the thing in the grass with a machine-gun, killing it. Mei goes to get a camera, but suddenly freezes and slowly vanishes, as Salif and Zao watch.

The colony flight is eventful, as most of the colonists are members of an extreme patriarchal cult, which believes in women shaving their hair, wearing inflated garments and submitting to men. Leliah did not get along with them and was replaced. Maï Lan is nearly raped by several of them and Alexa is confined to her quarters for defending her. The landing is plagued by the planners decision to cut costs and causes a shuttle to crash land, separating part of the crew. They begin a trek back, along with several stowaways. A chance at a speedier rescue is thwarted when a large number of animals come to feed on flowers that sprung up in the midst of their camp. Jedidiah orders them fired upon, causing a mass panic in which their helicopter is destroyed. Several people die along the way, from animal attacks. Kim's daughter also vanishes. An ionic beam, seen afterwards, points to the neighbouring planet, Antares-4.

Alexa eventually steals a shuttle to rescue them. When they return, they find that the fanatics have seized control of the camp, and order the women to comply with their new rules. Alexa refuses, causing a counter-revolt and order is returned. Jedidiah, learning of the beam, intends to head to the planet, to represent humanity. Eventually, a joint expedition is organised, although Jedidiah again causes problems. The only sign of life is a giant stone sphere at "Point X", the origin of the beams. The stone is extremely heavy, yet can float and has a sticky surface. A smaller stone sphere appears and probes the crew. Sven and another alien watch from afar. Holograms of Lynn and Mei appear and then vanish. A larger, solid duplicate of their craft appears beside them.

Kim and Alexa board the replica of the shuttle to be transported to an unknown place where they find Lynn, the daughter of Kim, and Liang Mei, a member of the team who had disappeared three years ago. Back, still so mysteriously, to the original shuttle, the crew of the mission is finally contacted by Sven, the extraterrestrial father of Lynn, and his superior Eltven. Jedidiah tries to create a contact, but is severely rebuffed by Sven who explains to him that it is the men like him, obtuse and confided in the belief that they hold the absolute truth, which mean that the high leaders of Sven's people have until now denied contact with humans they have known since the colonization of Aldebaran. Deeply upset by this final questioning of his beliefs, Jedidiah commits suicide. At the same time, Sven and Eltven explain that the phenomena that led the Earthlings on the planet are the fact of another extraterrestrial civilization, much more advanced and of which they know nothing,

The extraterrestrials decide to establish a progressive contact with the Earth people, which will result in a scientific collaboration between the Terrans and Tsaltérians (the species of Sven) to study a cube with strange properties which is on an unexplored continent of Aldebaran. Any contact between the Terrans and Tsaltérians will have to go through Kim Keller who will be the only one to be able to contact them and will also be at the head of the earth science team. Alexa Komarova, meanwhile, is chosen to become the ambassador of the Terrans and will have to go to the planet of Tsalarians with Driss Shediac, from the first cycle. Lynn will also have to go to this planet to receive proper education during her next aquatic phase. She is a very important person because she is the first known case of hybridization between Tsaltérians and humans, probably due to the modification of Kim's metabolism, caused by the ingestion of the Mantris capsules.

=== The Survivors Cycle ===
Twelve youngsters, members of the UN school, are the only survivors of the Tycho Brahe, a colony ship on the way to Aldebaran. They and their small shuttle land safely on the planet GJ1347-4, in the Gliese 1347 star system, touching down in a jungle. They encounter insectoid primitives and strange humanoids. The humanoids buy their shuttle and communicators and give them a rifle and coins, as well as directions to a town.

Soon they leave the jungle, entering a Savannah region. They find a rifle of theirs and the corpse of Helena. They also encounter natives, leading Shirley and Goran as prisoners. Goran fights back and they kill him. Marie walks forward and calmly dispatches all of the aliens. They also rescue a lion-like alien, Antac, who seems friendly. He communicates that he was on his way to a planet, but landed on the planet the same as them.

Alex and Marie head to a nearby river to replenish their water and encounter a brief disturbance in the gravity field and a rainstorm, with a sharply defined boundary between. Entering it, they discover that they have travelled six years into the future. The rest left to join Antac's group, but periodically revisit the site.

They dress in provided leather clothing, but two others arrive, having passed through the same boundary. They all travel to the town, where multiple species mingle, having been stranded like themselves. They encounter Djamila and more of the group.

Survivors are killed one after the other. The last two, Marie and Alex meet a Mantris that gives them the pills. Finally, they end up meeting Sven and leave the planet.

=== Return to Aldebaran ===
Kim returns to her home planet, having become famous. However, the way extraterrestrials want to work with earthlings makes a lot of people skeptical. During a speech, she is the victim of an attack. His daughter Lynn is seriously injured and must leave for the planet of her father Sven to be operated on. Kim then meets Marie. The latter becomes her bodyguard. Then there is another attack.

=== Neptune ===
Two humans are found dead aboard a flying saucer coming towards Earth, killed by nanobots. A mothership is found orbiting the planet Neptune, with humans and robots on board. The UN decides to launch a rescue mission, but it fails because of the threat that the nanobots pose. Seeing that Marie's organism, enhanced by the Mantris, was able to destroy them on its own, Kim decides that the two of them should be the only ones to attempt the rescue mission.

== Originals ==
=== Aldebaran ===
1. La catastrophe - Feb. 1994 - ISBN 2-205-04186-X
2. La blonde - June 1995 - ISBN 2-205-04365-X
3. La photo - March 1996 - ISBN 2-205-04476-1
4. Le groupe - May 1997 - ISBN 2-205-04569-5
5. La créature - Oct. 1998 - ISBN 2-205-04761-2

=== Bételgeuse ===
1. La planète - Jan 2000 - ISBN 2-205-04902-X
2. Les survivants - March 2001 - ISBN 2-205-04987-9
3. L'expédition - May 2002 - ISBN 2-205-05231-4
4. Les cavernes - Nov. 2003 - ISBN 2-205-05475-9
5. L'autre - Aug. 2005 - ISBN 2-205-05636-0

=== Antares ===
1. Épisode 1 - April 2007 - ISBN 978-2-205-05889-5
2. Épisode 2 - Feb. 2009 - ISBN 978-2-205-06185-7
3. Épisode 3 - Feb. 2010 - ISBN 978-2-205-06371-4
4. Épisode 4 - Oct. 2011 - ISBN 978-2-205-06765-1
5. Épisode 5 - Oct. 2013 - ISBN 978-2-205-07127-6
6. Épisode 6 - Feb. 2016 - ISBN 978-1849182584

=== Survivants ===
1. Épisode 1 - Jan. 2011 - ISBN 978-2-205-06524-4
2. Épisode 2 - Oct. 2012 - ISBN 978-2-205-06996-9
3. Épisode 3 - Sep. 2014 - ISBN 978-2-205-07135-1
4. Épisode 4 - Apr. 2016 - ISBN 978-2-205-07509-0
5. Épisode 5 - Mar. 2017 - ISBN 978-2-205-07666-0

=== Retour sur Aldebaran ===
1. Épisode 1 - May 2018 - ISBN 978-2205077797
2. Épisode 2 - June 2019 - ISBN 978-2-205-07938-8
3. Épisode 3 - October 2020 - ISBN 978-2-205-08397-2

=== Neptune ===
1. Épisode 1 - January 2022 - ISBN 978-2-205-08966-0
2. Episode 2 - September 2022 - ISBN 978-2-205-20289-2

=== Bellatrix ===
1. Épisode 1 - September 2023 - ISBN 978-220520617-3
2. Épisode 2 - September 2024 - ISBN 978-220521148-1

== Translations ==
Cinebook Ltd is publishing the series in English translation. The following volumes have been released so far:

=== Aldebaran ===
1. The Catastrophe (includes The Blond) – June 2008 ISBN 978-1-905460-57-1
2. The Group (includes The Photo) – October 2008 ISBN 978-1-905460-70-0
3. The Creature (includes The Betelgeuse Planet) – June 2009 ISBN 978-1-905460-93-9

=== Betelgeuse ===
1. The Survivors (includes The Expedition) – October 2009 ISBN 978-1-84918-004-7
2. The Caves – April 2010 ISBN 978-1-84918-028-3
3. The Other – June 2010 ISBN 978-1-84918-036-8

=== Antares ===
1. Episode 1 – October 2011 ISBN 978-1-84918-097-9
2. Episode 2 – May 2012 ISBN 978-1-84918-120-4
3. Episode 3 – March 2013 ISBN 978-1-84918-150-1
4. Episode 4 – August 2013 ISBN 978-1-84918-166-2
5. Episode 5 – July 2014 ISBN 978-1849182058
6. Episode 6 – December 2015 ISBN 978-1849182584

=== The Survivors: Quantum Anomalies ===
1. Episode 1 – December 2014 ISBN 978-1-84918-217-1
2. Episode 2 – April 2015 ISBN 978-1-84918-243-0
3. Episode 3 – March 2016 ISBN 978-1-84918-294-2
4. Episode 4 – March 2017 ISBN 978-1-84918-346-8
5. Episode 5 – November 2017 ISBN 978-1-84918-370-3

=== Return to Aldebaran ===
1. Episode 1 – September 2019 ISBN 978-1-84918-461-8
2. Episode 2 – July 2020 ISBN 978-1-84918-541-7
3. Episode 3 – June 2021 ISBN 978-1-80044-024-1

=== Neptune ===
1. Episode 1 – February 2023 ISBN 978-1-80044-091-3
2. Episode 2 – April 2023 ISBN 978-1-80044-100-2

== Notable differences ==
=== Censorship ===
The English versions have been censored by their publisher, Cinebook, replacing the original panels which exhibited graphic nudity with edited versions where underwear has been added to previously nude characters.

This created a small amount of controversy among the comic reading public, both because the added underwear seems out of place in several key segments of the story, where there were reasons for the characters to be nude plot-wise, and also for the act of censorship itself in what is, in essence, a comic book series marketed for the adult public as it has been in other countries. This has led some fans to seek the original, uncensored versions from different languages and sources.

When asked, the publisher stated that all changes were done with the authorisation of the author, and were necessary to make sure the titles would not be simply pulled in several countries where laws regulating nudity in publications are extremely strict.

=== Character names ===
Several characters have been given a different name in the English version: Marc Sorensen is known as Mark, and Manon Servoz as Marie.

== See also ==
- Land Rover series - A variant of the Land Rover from the 20th century which is called a jeep being used by the characters in the second episode of "Return to Aldebaran".
