= Didier Tarquin =

French cartoonist and comic book writer (born 1967)

Didier Tarquin (born 20 January 1967, Toulon) is a French cartoonist and comic book writer.

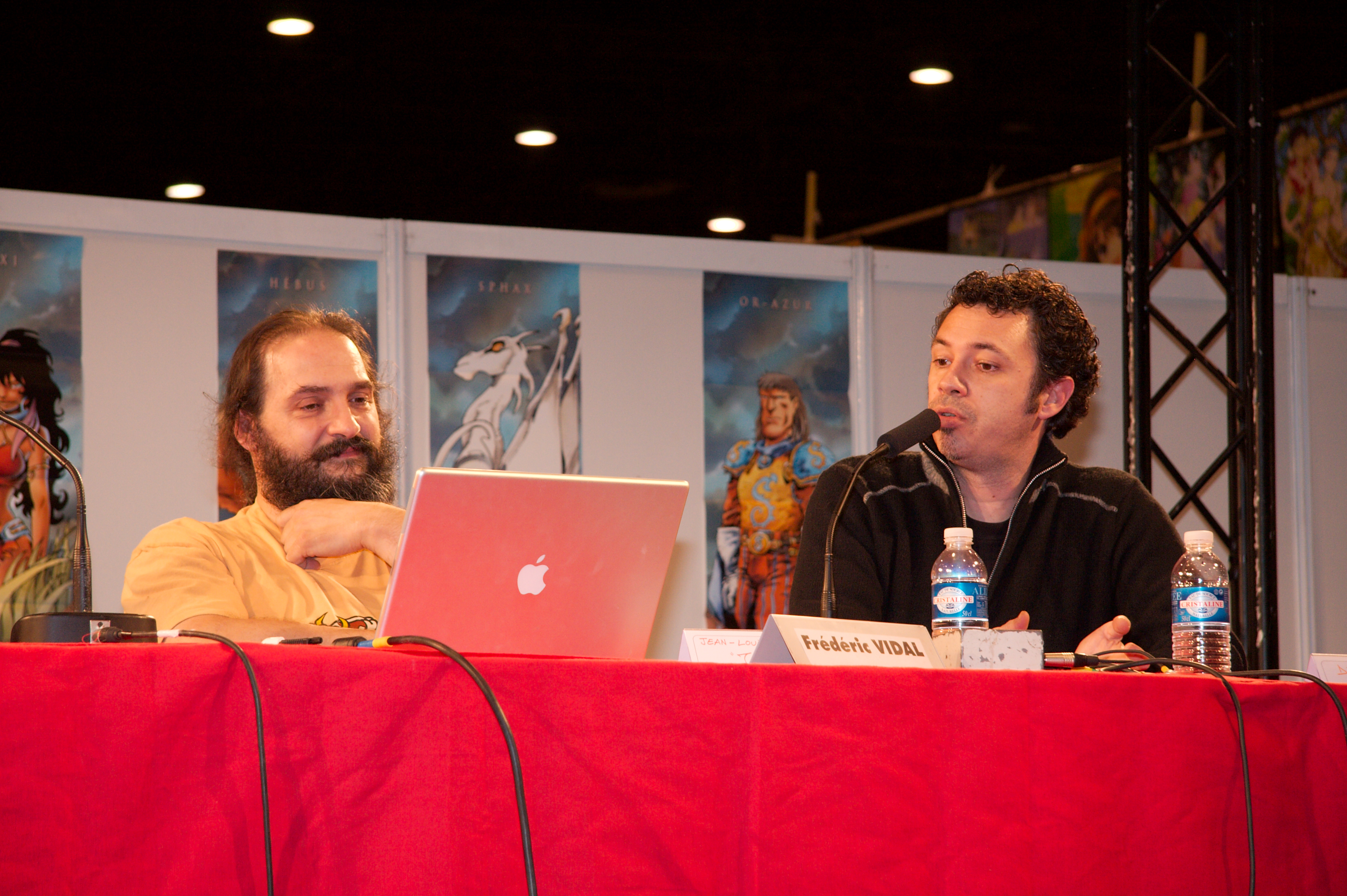
Jean-Louis Mourier and Didier Tarquin (2007) Chibi Japan

He spent the first ten years of his life in Touggourt (Algeria) in the Sahara desert. He chose to become a cartoonist during a cartoon summer camp. His professional career started in 1990 with Soleil comics but he attained real fame in 1994 with the series Lanfeust of Troy in collaboration with Christophe Arleston.

== Works ==
- Lanfeust of Troy
- Lanfeust of the stars
- Gnomes of Troy
- Roq
