= Joe Bar Team =

Famed series of biker comics

Joe Bar Team is a famed series of biker ("motards" in French) comics whose main characters experience all sort of situations and adventures every-day riders encounter often in real life. They were originally released by Vents d'Ouest. The original idea was created by Bar2 (Christian Debarre) and carried on by Fane (Stéphane Deteindre) who also introduced three new younger characters.

Joe Bar is a pun on barjo, a colloquial word which means nuts, not, as is sometimes thought, jobard which means crazy.

== Publication history ==
The first volume was initially released in 1990 and has had seven more volumes for a total of eight. The riders' adventures were originally set in 1975 Paris but their motorcycles were switched for more modern ones in some of the comics. The time setting is not really important, since the situations they encounter are timeless, humorously depicting all aspects of motorcycling spirit.

A typical example of a Joe Bar Team Vignette

Currently, nine volumes and a special are still published. The first and fifth album were made by Bar2, the other four albums were made by Fane.

Joe Bar Team featured briefly in the British magazine Super Bike.

== Characters and their bikes ==
Appearing since the first album
Joe, cafe proprietor. Does not normally ride, but has appeared on a Moto Guzzi at least twice.
Edouard Bracame - (Arbre à cames : camshaft) Honda CB750 since second album : Honda CB 1000 Big One
Guido Brasletti An Italian looking wording of "guidon bracelet" which was a very typical modification on Italian bikes or with Italian parts. They were small implements that attached directly to the front fork tubes instead of the traditional handlebar and gave a forward crouched more aerodynamic position. Known in UK as 'clip-ons'. - Ducati 750 sport since second album Ducati 900SS
Jean-Raoul Ducable Pun on " J'enroule du cable" (rolling in cable) a slang way of saying accelerating on a bike since you twist the handle to "roll in cable"- Kawasaki 750 H2 since second album Suzuki GSXR 750
Jean Manchzeck - (pun on "j'emmanche sec" a slang way of saying I drive very fast ) Norton Commando 850 since second album Triumph Daytona 900
Appeared in the second album for the first time:
Paul Posichon (Gallicization of "pole position") - Yamaha XT600
Pierre Leghnome - (Leghnome : the gnome; bearing in mind the sheer size of the V-Max) Yamaha V-Max
Jérémie Lapurée Pun on "J'ai remis la purée" a slang way to say I accelerated again, la purée is a metaphor for power- Harley-Davidson XL883R Sportrack
Raoul Toujourd, Pun on "roule toujours", or "always rolls". BMWs of the era were known for their reliability, if not always for their speed. – BMW R90/6
