= Dany (comics) =

Belgian comics artist

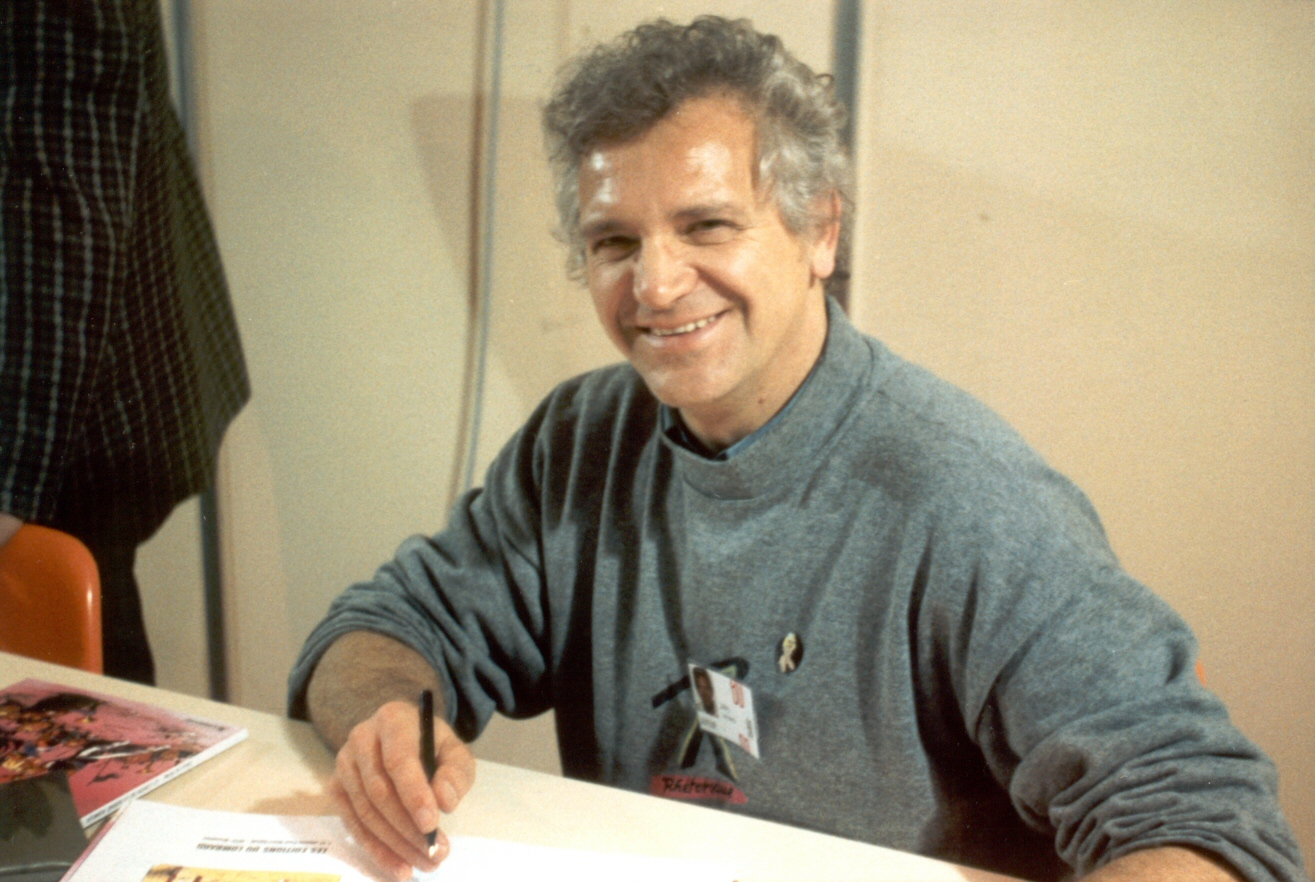
- Dany in 1990
- Born: Daniel Henrotin; 28 January 1943 (age 83) Marche-en-Famenne, Belgium
- Areas: artist, writer
- Notable works: Olivier Rameau; Ça vous intéresse? Equator
- Awards: 1971 Prix Saint-Michel, Future award

Dany, pseudonym for Daniel Henrotin (born 28 January 1943), is a Belgian comic book artist, best known for Olivier Rameau and Ça vous intéresse?.

== Biography ==
Daniel Henrotin was born in Marche-en-Famenne in 1943. After studying at the Art School of Liège, he started working as a comics artist in 1966, as an assistant for Mitteï, an artist working for Tintin magazine. Dany worked there for a year and then had to leave in order to do his military service.

Afterwards, he started collaborating directly on Tintin magazine with illustrations and short stories, and worked in the studio of Greg, the editor-in-chief of the magazine. Greg wrote a poetic story about Olivier Rameau and the people of Dreamland, and it marked the debut of Dany's first successful and longest running series. Dreamland is very similar to the worlds of L. Frank Baum's Oz and Lewis Carroll's Alice and Dany drew an adaptation of Alice shortly after starting the Olivier Rameau series.

Much of Dany's early work was drawn in a comical style, but in the late 1970s he produced more realistic drawings while in collaboration with writer Jean Van Hamme. This included Histoire sans héros ("Story Without a Hero") in 1977, which was a one-shot adventure story about the survivors of a plane crash trying to find a way out of a dense South American jungle. It obtained critical success and reached a wide audience. Dany and Van Hamme also came up with a series called Arlequin, the adventures of a freelance secret agent and master of disguise made in the spirit of The Persuaders! which was very popular in continental Europe.

Meanwhile, Greg and Dany would collaborate on some other short-lived series, and in the 1990s Greg wrote the final two stories of Bernard Prince for Dany after Hermann had quit the series. (a character based on Prince had featured in one of the Arlequin stories).

But his main commercial success came in 1990 when he started a series of erotic joke comics with Ça vous intéresse?. The series was an instant success, and many artists and writers have collaborated on the books, magazines, and multimedia that have followed since.

In 2023 Dany teamed up with veteran screenwriter Yann for Spirou and the Blue Gorgon, which was released in October 2023. A year later, the album was denounced in a TikTok video over its portrayal of black characters, and women. Publisher Dupuis withdrew the album from sale on October 31, 2024, and apologized for their error in judgement. Dany denied any intentional racism, saying he had only attempted to emulate Spirou creator André Franquin's style, but that he regretted having hurt anyone.

== Bibliography ==
Series	Years	Volumes	Scenarist	Editor	Remarks
Olivier Rameau	1970–2005	12	Greg	Le Lombard, Dargaud, and Joker	
Alice au pays des merveilles (Alice in Wonderland)	1973	1	Lewis Carroll, Greg	Le Lombard and Dargaud	Additional artwork by Dupa, Turk and De Groot
Jo Nuage et Kay McCloud	1976	1	Greg	Dargaud	
Histoire sans héros	1977–1997	2	Jean Van Hamme	Le Lombard and Dargaud	
Arlequin	1979–1985	3	Jean Van Hamme	Le Lombard and Dargaud	
Bernard Prince	1980–1989	2	Greg	Le Lombard and Dargaud	Continuation of the series started by Hermann Huppen
Ça vous intéresse?	1990–2002	6	De Groot and others	P&T Productions and Joker Editions	
Equator	1992–1998	3	Dany	Le Lombard and Alpen	
Sur les traces de Dracula	2006	3	Dany & Yves H	Casterman	Tome 1 Illustrated by Hermann, Tome 2 by Séra
Les guerrières de Troy	2010	1	Christophe Arleston, Melanÿn	Soleil Productions	
Spirou et Fantasio	2023	1	Yann	Dupuis	Withdrawn 31 October 2024 due to racist depictions.

== Awards ==
- 1971: Prix Saint-Michel, Humour Award, for Olivier Rameau
- 2007: Prix Saint-Michel, Best Artwork
- 2011: Prix Diagonale

== See also ==
- Red Ears

== Sources ==
- Béra, Michel; Denni, Michel; and Mellot, Philippe (1998): "Trésors de la Bande Dessinée 1999–2000". Paris, Les éditions de l'amateur. ISBN 2-85917-258-0
- Dany publications in Belgian Tintin, French Tintin, Pilote and BoDoï BDoubliées (in French)

Footnotes
