= Lanfeust of Troy =

French comic series

Lanfeust of Troy is a long-running French language comic series written by Christophe Arleston, drawn by Didier Tarquin, and published by Soleil Productions. The first volume was released in 1994.

== Synopsis ==
On the world of Troy, most humans have a single magic power. Each power is unique to the person and includes such diverse feats as walking on water, personal teleportation, and causing thirst in others. However, none can use their power unless in the close or remote presence of a sage of Eckmül, Troy's version of a studied magician.

Lanfeust is an orphan and an apprentice blacksmith who can heat metal at will. His adventure begins when he is asked to mend the sword of a passing aristocrat. When handling the sword's pommel, which was made of ivory from the Magohamoth—a legendary magical beast—Lanfeust gains the power to use any power known in Troy, more so without the presence of a sage. Nicolede, both the local sage and Lanfeust's future father-in-law, persuades Lanfeust to accompany him and his daughters C'ian and Cixi to the University of Magic in Eckmül in order to learn more about this phenomenon.

Among the many perils faced during their journey, they are ultimately confronted by Thanos, a pirate with the same potential as Lanfeust who will do whatever it takes to steal the ivory of the Magohamoth.

== Presentation ==
Lanfeust of Troy fits primarily within the high fantasy genre but is clearly meant for older audiences. Despite high fantasy's classic trappings, the series also incorporates copious humor through numerous methods, including word play, hidden messages, innuendo, and bawdy dialogue.

== Main characters ==
=== Lanfeust ===
Lanfeust, the eponymous hero, is a young villager and apprentice blacksmith. He was planning on settling down with his fiancée, C'ian, and leading a quiet, peaceful life until he discovered the power that the Magohamoth's ivory bestowed upon him. Though brave enough from the beginning to face extreme danger, Lanfeust remains happy-go-lucky and demonstrates naïveté in many matters of life and love.

His original power allows him to heat and even melt metal at will, a handy trick that led him into blacksmithing. However, his true power arises when he possesses the Magohamoth's ivory. It technically allows him to use any magic power that has ever existed, but in practice it allows Lanfeust to accomplish almost any magical feat he can imagine.

Lanfeust's name comes from the common Breton place name.

=== Thanos ===
A renegade sage from Eckmül's University of Magic, Thanos is also an accomplished pirate and, unknown to many, the tyrannical baron Averroës. Like Lanfeust, when possessing Magohamoth ivory, Thanos becomes almost omnipotent, though he would use these powers to conquer Eckmül and probably the whole world. Intelligent, opportunistic, and ruthless, Thanos commands the respect and fear of his followers even without his absolute magical power.

As a former sage of Eckmül, Thanos knows many useful spells and rituals. Unlike other sages, Thanos never gave up his original magic power, which allows him to teleport anywhere he's ever been. However, teleporting strips him of all his possessions, even his clothes.

Thanos's name is a shortened form of the root word thanatos, the Greek word for death. Prepending an a turns the word into its opposite, athanatos, which would mean immortal. Both forms have been used as given names.

=== Nicolède ===
Nicolède serves as the village of Glinin's sage. Like Thanos, Nicolede knows many spells and allows his fellow villagers to use their powers through his mere presence. He's also the village's main source of knowledge on the greater world. Kind and wise, Nicolède serves as a mentor for Lanfeust, his future son-in-law, as well as his daughters C'ian and Cixi. He has little patience for weak morals, which constantly puts him at odds with Cixi.

Nicolede's name refers to Nicolas Flamel (an alchemist) and Archimedes (the ancient engineer).

=== C'ian ===
Nicolede's elder daughter, C'ian is Lanfeust's fiancée and Glinin's resident healer. Though extremely beautiful, C'ian is modest, romantic, and wants nothing more than a quiet life with a husband and many children. C'ian's power only functions at night, but it allows her to instantly heal almost any injury or illness imaginable.

C'ian's name refers to the Empress Dowager Ci'an, who was regarded as quiet and respectable unlike her co-ruler, Cixi. C'ian also refers to the color cyan, easily the most used color in her usual garb.

=== Cixi ===
Nicolede's younger daughter, Cixi is very beautiful like her sister, but major similarities end there. She is rebellious against father, society, and decency. She dresses and talks provocatively for her time and place. Infatuated with Lanfeust, she attempts to seduce him whenever she can despite reprovals and scoldings from her father and sister. Of all Troy's beings, Lanfeust seems to fear only Cixi and her advances. Cixi can change the phase of water at will. The difficulty of this feat increases greatly as the purity of the water decreases.

Cixi's name refers to the Empress Dowager Cixi, co-regent of China and infamous for her shameless acts.

=== Hébus ===
Just like most of his troll species, Hébus was an almost mindless menace to any living thing in his path until he fell under Nicolede's spell. Throughout Lanfeust's adventures, he serves as an excellent bodyguard for his companions/captors. When enchanted, Hébus demonstrates that he's fairly intelligent, witty, and friendly, though he's rowdy and retains many of a troll's rude behaviors. However, if Nicolede's enchantment lapses, Hébus instantly becomes as savage and murderous as he was originally.

The name Hébus is a pun when combined with the word troll (troll Hébus, which in French sounds like trolley bus).

== The universe of Troy ==
=== The naming of planet Troy ===
The French-speaking discoverers of Troy's planetary system decided on a whim to officially name each planet after its numeric position from its sun. One, two, and three in French are un, deux, and trois respectively. In French, Troy looks and sounds similar to trois, and so Troy gained its name because it was the third planet in its system. This pun is referred to in "Un, Deux, Troy", the title of volume 1 of Lanfeust of the Stars.

=== Fauna ===
Troy supports a rich diversity of life. Though humans generally thrive there, Troy's fauna pose an especially lethal threat to them.

A few animals of particular interest:

- Petaure - A mammoth-like beast of burden and transport. The rider directs a petaure through song.

==== Sentient beings ====
- Humans - Similar to medieval earthlings, though most Troyans have one magical power.
- Trolls - Massive hairy humanoids, trolls live in bloodthirsty savagery unless tamed by the power of a sage. When under a sage's spell, trolls are actually quite intelligent and social, though they remain somewhat impulsive and assertive.
- Darshanide Gods - Only arguably a species but clearly sentient and mortal, they are the materialization of collective beliefs in Darshan.
- Magohamoth - This possibly unique creature is said to be the source of magic on Troy and is the source of Lanfeust and Thanos' power.

=== Regions ===
==== Souardy ====
Along with its capital, Eckmül, Souardy resembles a fantastical version of medieval Europe. Virtually all its citizens have one magical talent which, more often than not, will determine the profession of the person. For example, Lanfeust's talent to heat metal without a forge naturally steered him towards the life of a blacksmith.

==== Darshan ====
Darshan resembles imperial China and feudal Japan. It lies across the sea from Souardy. Darshanides do not have any magical talents, though their hypothetical latent power instead may give form to their collective gods.

==== The Baronies ====
The Baronies also resemble medieval Europe. Its fractious barons forever compete with each other for land and power. The people of the Baronies resent magic and forego its practice while focusing on martial talent instead.

== Publication history ==
Lanfeust of Troy was originally published in a graphic novel format in eight volumes, though it has been republished in other formats.

1. Ivory of the Magohamoth (FR: L'Ivoire du Magohamoth) (ISBN 9782877642576) (1994)
2. Thanos the Discordant (FR: Thanos l'incongru) (ISBN 9782877643061) (June 1995)
3. Castle Or-Azur (FR: Castel Or-Azur) (ISBN 9782877643948) (April 1996)
4. The Paladin from Eckmül (FR: Le Paladin d'Eckmül) (ISBN 9782877645669) (November 1996)
5. The Tremor of the Haruspex (FR: Le Frisson de l'Haruspice) (ISBN 9782877646468) (October 1997)
6. Empress Cixi (FR: Cixi Impératrice) (ISBN 9782877647953) (October 1998)
7. Petaures Hide in Order to Die (FR: Les Pétaures Se Cachent pour Mourir) (ISBN 9782877649230) (October 1999)
8. The Fabulous Beast (FR: La Bête Fabuleuse) (ISBN 9782845650336) (December 2000)
9. Unknown title (2008). The story will be a filler arc set during the eight weeks unfolding between volume 8 of Lanfeust de Troy and volume 1 of the sequel series Lanfeust of the Stars.

== Spin-offs, prequels and sequels ==
Successful in the francophone world from which it arose, Lanfeust of Troy has spawned one sequel and several spin-offs and prequels.

=== Lanfeust of the Stars ===
The follow-up to Lanfeust of Troy, this series recounts the adventures of Lanfeust, Cixi, Hébus, and Thanos beyond the world of Troy. (8 issues)

- Lanfeust of the Stars #1 - One, Two, Troy (2001)
- Lanfeust of the Stars #2 - The Towers of Meirrion (2003)
- Lanfeust of the Stars #3 - The Sands of Abraxar (2004)
- Lanfeust of the Stars #4 - The Drinkers of Worlds (2004)
- Lanfeust of the Stars #5 - The Ride of the Bacteria (2005)
- Lanfeust of the Stars #6 - The Pirate's Cry (2006)
- Lanfeust of the Stars #7 - The Secret of the Dolphantes (2007)
- Lanfeust of the Stars #8 - The Blood of Comets (2008)

=== Lanfeust Odyssey ===
The next sequel of Lanfeust's adventures. 9 issues have been published between 2009 and 2017.

Lanfeust Odyssey #1 - The Enigma of Gold Azure Part I (2009)

Lanfeust Odyssey #2 - The Enigma of Gold Azure Part II (2010)

Lanfeust Odyssey #3 - The Banished of Eckmül (2011)

Lanfeust Odyssey #4 - The Great Hunt (2012)

Lanfeust Odyssey #5 - The Sand Trap (2013)

Lanfeust Odyssey #6 - The Bilious Delta (2014)

Lanfeust Odyssey #7 - The Mephitic Armada (2015)

Lanfeust Odyssey #8 - Tseu-Hi The Guardian (2016)

Lanfeust Odyssey #9 - The Ingenious Strategist (2017)

=== Cixi of Troy ===
A 3-part spinoff focusing on the adventures of Cixi. The story continues with Lanfeust of Troy #7.

Cixi of Troy 01 - The Secret of Cixi (2010)

Cixi of Troy 02 - The Dark Shadow (2010)

Cixi of Troy 03 - Drop Dead Cixi (2011)

=== Lanfeust Quest ===
The remake of the first saga into manga format.(3 issues)

=== Trolls of Troy ===
The first spin-off series, it only shares its setting with Lanfeust of Troy; it tells a distinct story with different characters.(16 issues)

=== Gnomes of Troy ===
Gnomes of Troy takes a humorous look at Lanfeust's childhood and schooling.(2 issues)

=== Conquerors of Troy ===
The latest series is set centuries earlier than Lanfeust of Troy and examines Troy's forced colonization.(3 issues)

=== Legends of Troy ===
The next prequel of the Troy chronicles.(1 issues)
