= Frank Le Gall =

French comic author (born 1959)

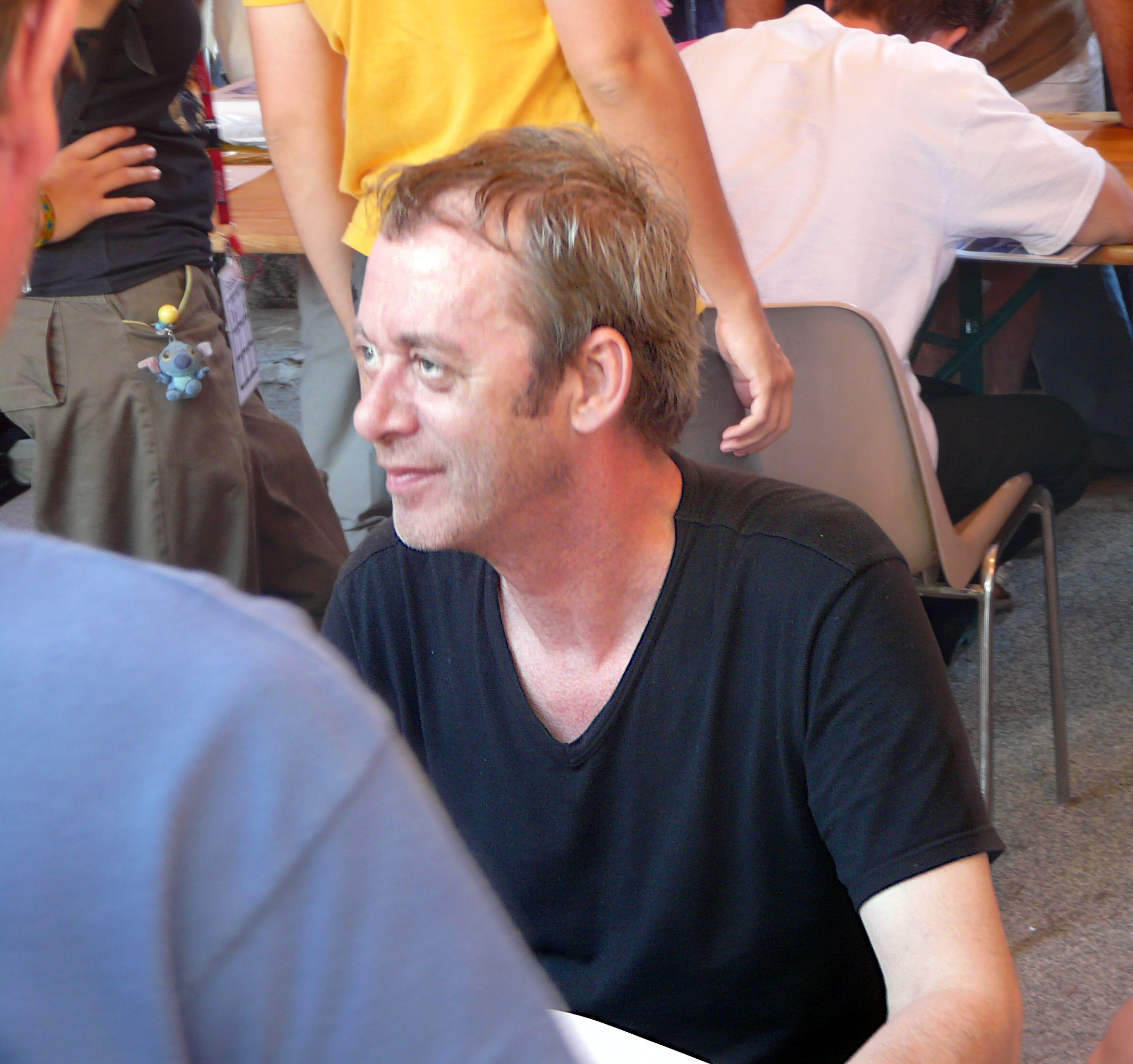
- Le Gall in 2008
- Born: 23 September 1959 (age 67) Rouen, France

Frank Le Gall (born 23 September 1959 in Rouen), is a French author of comics. He was first published as a comic author at the age of 16 in Pistil. He then went on to work for Spirou, creating "Valry Bonpain," a comic series following a jazz musician, with Alain Clement. He is best known for his own comic series Théodore Poussin.

== Publications ==
- Une aventure de Spirou et Fantasio : Les marais du temps, (Dupuis, 2007)
- Petits contes noirs - La Biologiste n'a pas de culotte (Dargaud, 2001)
- Petits contes noirs - La Fin du Monde (Dargaud, 2000)
- Les formidables aventures de Lapinot - Vacances de printemps, drawn by Lewis Trondheim, (Dargaud, 1999)
- Théodore Poussin, (Dupuis, from 1987 to 2005)
1. Capitaine Steene, 1987
2. Les mangeurs d'archipels, 1987
3. Marie Vérité, 1988
4. Secrets, 1990
5. Le trésor du rajah blanc, 1991
6. Un passager porté disparu, 1992
7. La vallée des roses, 1993
8. La maison dans l'île, 1994
9. La terrasse des audiences, Tome 1, 1995
10. La terrasse des audiences, Tome 2, 1997
11. Novembre toute l'année, 2000
12. Les jalousies, 2005
13. Le dernier voyage de l'Amok, 2018
14. Aro Satoe, 2023
- Les Barbutins (Delcourt, collection Jeunesse)
- Catastrophes au pays du Père Noël (Delcourt, collection Jeunesse, 1996)
