= Ythaq: The Forsaken World =

Les Naufragés d'Ythaq (literally: "The Shipwrecked of Ythaq") is a series of planetary romance science fiction comics by Soleil Productions, written by Christophe Arleston and illustrated by Adrien Floch. Its issues 1 to 3 were translated by Marvel Comics as Ythaq: The Forsaken World and issues 4 to 6 as Ythaq: No Escape. All comics were pre-published by monthly comic magazine Lanfeust Mag.

== Synopsis ==
A cruise spaceship Comet's Tail crashes onto an uncharted planet inhabited by many strange alien races, many of which are unfriendly. In one crashed module are three survivors: beautiful, resourceful and sporty lady lieutenant Granite Welgoat, young and innocent technician Narvarth Bodyssey, and rich, beautiful and manipulative lady passenger Callista DeSargamore. They are trying to leave the planet and find if there are any other survivors, several of them found indeed. It turns out that some of marooned can control one of the four elements.

Eventually it turned out that Ythaq is the range for the "game of Ythes", where major powers of the galaxy play for centuries. Issue 9 The Impossible Truth , where this revelation was made, appeared to tie all loose ends and end the story lines, so it looked like it was the last issue. However two years later issue 10 started the second cycle.

== Reception ==
A review in Spiegel Online noted that the dramatic action is supplemented with irony and humor ("Yes, Ythaq is dangerous - but when were extra-extraterrestrial chickens life-threatening for comic heroes?"), full with puns and allusions to various comics cliches.

== Issues ==
Issues 1-9 constitute the first cycle.

1. Terra incognita (2005)
2. Ophyde la géminée (2005)
3. Le Soupir des étoiles (2006)
4. L'Ombre de Khengis (2007)
5. L'Ultime Arcane (2007)
6. La Révolte des pions
7. La Marque des Ythes
8. Le Miroir des mensonges
9. L'Impossible vérité
10. Nehorf capitol transit
11. L'haleine de l'ogre
12. Les Clefs du Néant (2014)
13. Glèbes La Singulière (2015)
14. Le Joyau du génie (2016)
15. Imperator express (2018)

== Other translations ==
- German: Die Schiffbrüchigen von Ythaq, by Splitter Verlag
- Polish: Rozbitkowie z Ythaq, Fantasy Komiks magazine, by Egmont Polska
- Spanish: Los Náufragos de Ythaq, by Rossell Comics
- Dutch: The comics were reprinted by Uitgeverij L ("L Publishing House") (hardcover limited edition and softcover). Since issue 14 they were published in Eppo magazine.
