= Red Ears =

Belgian adult comic book series

- Author(s): Dany and others (see list below)
- Launch date: 1990
- Syndicate(s): Éditions Joker
- Genre(s): Erotic comics, Gag-a-day

Red Ears (Dutch: Rooie Oortjes, French: Blagues Coquines) is a Belgian adult comic book series launched by Dany in 1990. He started with commercial drawings and then moved on to comics. The series is published by Joker Editions.

== Concept ==
The books consist of several one-page-long gag-a-day comics, sometimes gag cartoons too, about women and men in erotic situations, usually nude or almost nude. It can be classified as dirty jokes, black comedy and soft pornography. As of 2012, 25 books have been published in the series by various cartoonists and script writers. Dany drew the first six books under the name "Ca vous intéresse?" ("Does that interest you"). The series has no recurring characters.

== Contributors ==
- Edouard Aidans (under the pen name "Hardan")
- Dany
- Bob de Groot
- Bruno Di Sano
- Didgé (under the pen name "Bloody")
- Gürcan Gürsel
- Hermann
- Josep Marti
- Jean-Claire Stibane (under the pen name "Gutsy")
- Tibet
- Tino

== See also ==
- Dany
