= Rork =

Graphic novel

Rork

Rork is a series of eight graphic novels by German comic author Andreas. It is also the name of the protagonist of the series.

The character Rork is a white-haired "wizard" from another dimension who solves supernatural mysteries, before embarking on a quest to discover his origins. During his quest, he is assisted by a cast of characters including occult detective Raffington Event, astrologer Capricorn, the psychic Deliah Darkthorne (aka "Low Valley") and her daughter Sy-Ra, the immortal Yosta, and others. His enemies are the mysterious Pharass and Dahmaloch, revealed to be an analogy for the Devil himself in the later and twin Capricorne series.

The Rork series is notable for its use of allegory, mysticism, visual sequencing and unusual "dynamic" framing, with a visual structure and rhythm rather uncommon in European comics.

Many mysteries explored in the various albums are not revealed until the seventh album and some albums of the twin Capricorne series, and even then many enigmas remain unanswered for the reader.

== The series ==
Cover of Rork: Passages graphic novel.

There are eight volumes in the Rork series:

- 0. Les Fantômes (The Ghosts) (Lombard, 2012)
- 1. Fragments (Lombard, 1984)
- 2. Passages (Lombard, 1984)
- 3. Le Cimetière des Cathédrales (The Graveyard of Cathedrals) (Lombard, 1988)
- 4. Lumière d'Etoile (Starlight) (Lombard, 1988)
- 5. Capricorne (Capricorn) (Lombard, 1990)
- 6. Descente (Descent) (Lombard, 1992)
- 7. Retour (Return) (Lombard, 1993)

== Publishing history ==
The Rork stories were originally serialized in Tintin magazine in 1978; after the Belgian edition was cancelled in 1980 the series continued in the French and Dutch edition of the magazine.

The first five Rork stories were translated by Jean-Marc Lofficier & Randy Lofficier. They were first serialized in black & white in Dark Horse's "Cheval Noir" comic, then published as graphic novels by NBM.

== Related comics ==
=== Capricorn ===
Capricorn is an astrologer and crime-fighter whose real identity is unknown. Ably assisted by librarian Astor and stunt flyer Ash Grey, Capricorn fights occult threats in the New York of the 1930s. His arch-enemy is the mysterious Mordor Gott.

==== Capricorn stories ====
- 1. L'Objet (The Object) (Lombard, 1996)
- 2. Électricité (Electricity) (Lombard, 1997)
- 3. Deliah (Lombard, 1998)
- 4. Le Cube Numérique (The Numerical Cube) (Lombard, 1999)
- 5. Le Secret (The Secret) (Lombard, 2000)
- 6. Attaque (Attack) (Lombard, 2001)
- 7. Le Dragon Bleu (The Blue Dragon) (Lombard, 2002)
- 8. Tunnel (Lombard, 2003)
- 9. Le Passage (Lombard, 2004)
- 10. Les Chinois (Lombard, 2005)
- 11. Patrick (Lombard, 2006)

Note: Capricorn's encounter with Rork (in Rork Nos. 5 and 7) takes place between Volumes 4 and 5 of the series.

=== Raffington Event ===
Raffington Event is a portly detective of the occult. He met Rork in Volumes 2 and 7 of the Rork saga.

==== Album ====
- Raffington Event, Detective (Lombard, 1989)
