= Okko =

Comic book series by Hub

- Cover artwork for Okko: The Cycle of Water, Book 1 (May 2005), cover art by Hub.
- Date: 2005–present
- Publisher: Delcourt

Creative team
- Writers: Hub
- Artists: Hub
- Colorists: Hub (Humbert Chabuel) and Stephane Pelayo

Original publication
- Language: French

Translation
- Publisher: Archaia Studios Press
- Date: 2006–Present
- Translator: Edward Gauvin

Okko is a comic book written and illustrated by Humbert Chabuel, who goes by the pen name Hub, with colors done by Hub and Stephan Pecayo. It was originally published in French as a series of books starting in 2005. An English translation by Edward Gauvin began to be published in 2006 by the French Delcourt and Archaia Studios Press.

The Okko series consists of five "cycles", ending with The Cycle of Emptiness published by Delcourt in 2015-2016.

== Premise ==
The action of the first cycle of Okko, The Cycle of Water, takes place at the far end of the known lands of the Empire of Pajan. Pajan itself is a vast and diversified island, surrounded by a multitude of archipelagoes. Its name is derived from that of its Imperial Family. Though the Pajans have reigned for a millennium, in the last few decades three major families—the Ataku, the Bashimon, and the Yommo—have called into question their legitimacy and now refuse to cease their battles against the Imperial Family. These power struggles have destabilized the Empire, and famine and catastrophes follow one another. This period of chaos is commonly called the Era of Asagiri (the Time of Mists).

The Okko series begins in the middle of this tumultuous period, in the year 1108 of the official calendar. The way of life and various habits of the inhabitants of the Empire of Pajan are rather close to those of medieval Japan. However, a major difference is the existence of supernatural creatures and magic. A technological revolution occurred a few centuries prior to the beginning of the series, allowing the creation of exo bunraku, colossal combat armors handled from within by marionettists. Their use radically changed the traditional art of war in the Pajan Empire. The Ataku family has taken the lead in the construction and the handling of these machines of war.

== Reception ==
The comic books were well received, and were praised for their originality and detail. However, it has been criticized for being unnecessarily verbose and slow moving.

A board game based on the comic books, Okko: Era of the Asagiri, was released by Asmodee in 2008.

== Comic books ==
The series consists of:

- The Cycle of Water (originally published by Delcourt in 2005)
- The Cycle of Earth (originally published by Delcourt in 2007-2008)
- The Cycle of Air (originally published by Delcourt in 2009-2010)
- The Cycle of Fire (originally published by Delcourt in 2011-2012)
- The Cycle of Emptiness (originally published by Delcourt in 2015-2016)
