= Michel Weyland =

Michel Weyland (born 19 August 1947) is a Belgian artist, writer and cartoonist.

== Biography ==
Born in Ixelles, Weyland studied arts at the Institut Saint-Luc in Brussels. In 1969, during his final year of study, he published in the Journal de Tintin a science fiction series entitled Stereo-land, which however he stopped after some thirty pages. From that year to 1979, he worked as a retoucher in a large printer plant in Brussels. In 1974, he made a few cartoons for the Belgian weekly Pourquoi pas?.

In August 1979, he created for the Journal de Tintin the character of Aria; the first album of this heroic fantasy series would be published in 1982 by Lombard. In September 1979, he left the photographic work to devote himself exclusively to comics. After the creation of Aria, Weyland worked in this series, the few exceptions including the science fiction fairytale Yvanaëlle, la Dame de Mordorez, published in 1988.

The 37th album of Aria, entitled Faîtes taire l'accusée, was published in 2015.

== Bibliography ==
- Stéréo-land (1968-1969)
- Mariage [sic] dans la 7ème Dimension (1979, in the Journal de Tintin) [sic]
- Le Chevalier de Prédor (1979, in the Journal de Tintin)
- L'Interview exclusive de Nostradamus (1979, in the Journal de Tintin)
- Yvanaëlle (1988, with Nadine Weyland)
- series "Aria" (1980-2015)
