= Aria (Belgian comic) =

Belgian comic strip (1980–2021)

- Cover to the final album, Carnet de Voyage (2021)
- Author: Michel Weyland
- Current status/schedule: Discontinued
- Launch date: 1980
- End date: 2021
- Syndicate(s): Le Lombard, Dupuis
- Genre(s): Fantasy, Adventure

Aria is a Belgian comic book series written and drawn by Michel Weyland, with colours by Nadine Weyland. It debuted in Tintin in August 1979.

== Synopsis ==
Aria is an unbound woman warrior, living in an unknown medieval era which is most likely situated in a parallel universe, or in the future. Technology and magic coexist, while the powers of the spiritual compete with those acquired by humans. Aria fights for the weak and voiceless, oppressed by the powerholders. She eventually overcomes all injustices and hostility, not in the least because of her good looks or fearlessness.

In 2019, publisher Dupuis decided to discontinue several long-running comic series, including Aria.

== Volumes ==
1. La Fugue d'Aria (1982; translated as Aria Takes Off in 1986)
2. La montagne aux sorciers (1982)
3. La septième porte (1983)
4. Les chevaliers d'Aquarius (1984)
5. Les larmes de la déesse (1985)
6. L'anneau des Elflings (1985)
7. Le tribunal des corbeaux (1986)
8. Le Méridien de Posidonia (1987)
9. Le Combat des dames (1987)
10. Œil d'ange (1988)
11. Les Indomptables (1988)
12. Janessandre (1989)
13. Le Cri du prophète (1990)
14. Le Voleur de lumière (1991)
15. Vendéric (1992)
16. Ove (1994)
17. La Vestale de Satan (1995)
18. Vénus en colère (1996) (Raging Venus)
19. Sacristar (1997)
20. La Fleur au ventre (1998)
21. La Griffe de l'ange (1999)
22. La Voie des rats (2000)
23. Le Poussar (2001)
24. L'Âme captive (2002)
25. Florineige (2003)
26. Le Jardin de Baohm (2004)
27. Chant d'étoile (2005)
28. L'Élixir du diable (2006)
29. La Poupée aux yeux de lune (2007)
30. Renaissance (2008)
31. La Mamaïtha (2009)
32. Le Diable Recomposé (2010)
33. Les Rescapés du Souvenir (2011)
34. Le Ventre de la Mort (2012)
35. Le Pouvoir des cendres (2013)
36. Le Chemin des crêtes (2014)
37. Faîtes taire l'accusée (2015)
38. Le Trône du Diable (2017)
39. Flammes Salvatrices (2019)
40. Carnet de voyage (2021)

== Publication ==
Le Lombard published the volumes 1–15; Dupuis (including reprints) volumes 1-30.

Part of the series was also published in the magazine Spirou.

== See also ==
- Belgian comics
- Franco-Belgian comics
