= Universal War One =

French science fiction comic book

- Cover to Universal War One #1, Marvel Publishing with Soleil Productions, circa 2008.

Publication information
- Publisher: Marvel Comics & Soleil Productions
- Format: Limited series
- Genre: Military science fiction
- Publication date: September 2008 – Junet 2009
- No. of issues: 6
- Main character(s): June Williamson, Commander; Kate Von Richtburg; John "Balti" Baltimore; Paulo "Mario" Del Gado; Amina El Moudden; Edward "Ed" Kalish; Milorad Racunicsa

Creative team
- Written by: Denis Bajram
- Artist: Denis Bajram
- Letterer: Joe Caramagna
- Colorist: Denis Bajram
- Editor(s): For Soleil, Olivier Jalabert and Jean Wacquet. For Marvel, Joe Quesada and Jeff Youngquist

Collected editions
- Universal War One: ISBN 0-7851-3238-4
- Universal War One: Revelations: ISBN 0-7851-3239-2

Universal War One is a six-part French comic book limited series written, penciled, and inked by Denis Bajram. The series was initially published in France by Soleil Productions from 1998 to 2006. Due to its popularity, it was later translated and released in English by Marvel Comics. The genre is military science fiction, and the series deals with such ideas as time dilation and time travel. Following the comics standards in France and Belgium, each of the six parts of the story has an approximately 50 pages length, making the whole story longer than usual limited series. The first issue of a follow-up series Universal War Two was released in French on 25 September 2013.

== Plot summary ==
The series begins at the onset of a civil war between the United Earth Forces (UEF) and the Colonization Industrial Companies (CIC), which comprises the various outposts and colonies beginning at the planet Saturn and beyond. The civil war begins when it is discovered that an immense black wall appears near Saturn, cutting the Solar System in two. The black wall absorbs all light and matter. Enormous, incomprehensible and terrifying, "the wall" is centered on Uranus's moon Oberon, cutting off access to any planet beyond Saturn. Admiral Von Richtburg discovers that the CIC was attempting to begin a civil war, and orders the Purgatory Squadron, a band of soldiers given a second chance after courts-martial, to investigate the phenomenon known as "the wall".

After the Purgatory Squadron devises a method of breaching and investigating the wall, they are fired upon by a vessel of unknown design. Admiral von Richtburg orders his UEF 3rd Fleet into the wall, and thus begins the First Universal War.

== Main characters ==
=== Purgatory Squadron ===
The Purgatory Squadron is composed of members who face Court Martial for various infractions ranging from rape, to insubordination (Resulting in Death) and assault. Each member is assigned (or sentenced) to the squadron as a last chance to prove themselves effective officers of the UEF (United Earth Forces). The ranks of some of the characters is not stated in the series.

- Captain June Williamson: Williamson is the commander of Purgatory Squadron, and is one-half of the only two members not currently facing a Court Martial for previous actions. Universal War One begins with Williamson protecting a group of civilians, mostly women and children, some of whom are family members of striking miners on the moon Titan, from being massacred by her commanding officer. Williamson firmly believes that the goals of the Purgatory Squadron can "save" its members, by proving they have the capacity to be useful officers of the United Earth Forces.
- Lieutenant Kate Von Richtburg: Richtburg is the Second-in-Command of Purgatory Squadron, and is the other half of the only two members not currently facing a Court Martial for previous actions. She gratefully accepted the position as second-in-command of Purgatory Squadron, as she has a great respect for her for not firing on herself and her mother while they tried to escape the mining riots on Titan. She has proven herself to be an able officer, and, like Capt. June Williamson, firmly believes that the members of Purgatory Squadron has what it takes to be capable officers.

Members of Purgatory Squadron:

- Lieutenant Paulo "Mario" Del Gado: A self-professed coward, Mario is ashamed of his actions which led to the destruction of three supply ships and the deaths of their pilots. Mario was a Navigation Technician in charge of guiding six ships through an asteroid field, but he panicked and three supply ships were destroyed. It was decided to partner him with Balti in an effort to keep him from deserting.
- John "Balti" Baltimore : All you need to know about Balti is that he wants to be a hero. With this goal as his only guide, he disobeyed orders not to intervene in the rescue operation of a transport ship that had caught fire. Unknown to him, a rescue shuttle had already been dispatched, which he collided with just before it could dock to save the ship. Twelve crew members were killed on the transport, and three others in the rescue ship were severely injured. Balti can be best described as someone whose heart is in the best place, but whose willingness to become a hero makes him a brash and unpredictable officer. Balti is killed at the end of Universal War One #3 as a direct result of the time dilation and time travel effects.
- Amina El Moudden: a native of the Middle East, Amina joined the EUF on her 18th birthday to escape her father's sexual abuse. Sometime after a Colonel in the EUF attempted to rape her, though somehow this failed, subsequently, to get her revenge, she castrated him with a welding torch, and as of Universal War One #1 he was in critical condition. Amina accidentally injures Milorad, incorrectly believing that he is her father coming to sexually assault her during an injury-induced hallucination after crashing her fighter.
- Lt. Colonel Edward "Ed" Kalish: Kalish is a genius who was formerly the head of the EUF 3rd Fleet's Space Physics Research Division. He was sentenced to the Purgatory Squadron after beating twelve people senseless in a bar-fight, three of which were critically wounded, as well as wrecking the bar. Williamson stated that his genius caused him to be so arrogant and superior that he felt he could "impose his will on others - with his fists if necessary", owing in part to his arrogance and the other to his rough upbringing and history of violence. Kalish discovered Milorad attempting to rape Amina, and nearly beat him to death, proving that he too was not making use of his second chance. Kalish is also the individual responsible for discovering the nature and effect of the wall.
- Milorad Racunicsa: Milorad was sentenced to the Purgatory Squadron after raping a nurse, an offence which he attempted to repeat on Amina in the first issue of Universal War One. It was this rape attempt that prompted Captain Williamson to inform each member of the squadron of all of their collective crimes. It was this event which prompted Balti to risk his life by entering the mysterious black "wall".

=== Other characters ===
- Admiral Von Richtburg: Commanding Officer of UEF 3rd Fleet, and father to Lieutenant Kate Von Richtburg. Admiral Richtburg is the reason why Purgatory Squadron was formed in the first place; he prevented Captain Williamson from being Court Martial, as her insubordination saved the life of his wife and daughter Kate who were trying to escape the mining riots on Titan. He is the officer who uncovered the betrayal of the CIC (Colonization Industrial Companies). He is a firm, uncompromising military officer and respected leader who has a deep love for his daughter.
- Colonel Edward: Little is known about this EUF officer, just that it is clear he hates the Purgatory Squadron and is unnecessarily rude and who would like nothing better than to see the squadron fail.

== Issues ==
The original Universal War One series was divided up into two sets of three issues by Marvel: Universal War One, collecting issues #1-#3, with the remaining three issues published under the title Universal War One: Revelations.

Universal War One:

  1. The Genesis (released in English on 16 July 2008)
  2. The Fruit of Knowledge (released in English on 13 August 2008)
  3. Cain and Abel (published in English on 3 September 2008)

Universal War One: Revelations (Universal War One issues #4-#6):

  1. The Flood (released in English on 1 April 2009)
  2. Babel (released in English on 6 May 2009)
  3. The Patriarch (published in English on 3 June 2009)

Universal War Two

  1. 40 Years in the Desert (published in French in August 2013)
  2. The Promised Land (published in French in September 2014)
  3. The Exodus (published in French in November 2016)
  4. The Fall of the Temple (will be published in French 20 November 2019)
  5. The Prophets (TBA)
  6. The Writing on the Wall (TBA)

=== Collected editions ===
The two series have been collected into individual volumes:

- Universal War One (144 pages, Marvel Comics, hardcover, January 2009, ISBN 0-7851-3238-4)
- Universal War One: Revelations (144 pages, Marvel Comics, hardcover, August 2009, ISBN 0-7851-3239-2)

In October 2015 Titan Comics released the hardcover collected edition of Universal War One (288 pages, Titan Comics, hardcover, October 2015, ISBN 1-7827-6238-8)

== Film ==
A live action film has been announced with a reported budget of 40 million dollars.

== Reception ==
- Bleeding Cool called it an "outstanding graphic novel".
- IGN criticized it for its leisurely pacing, and its fair amount of stilted dialogue.
