= Luiz Eduardo de Oliveira =

Brazilian comics creator

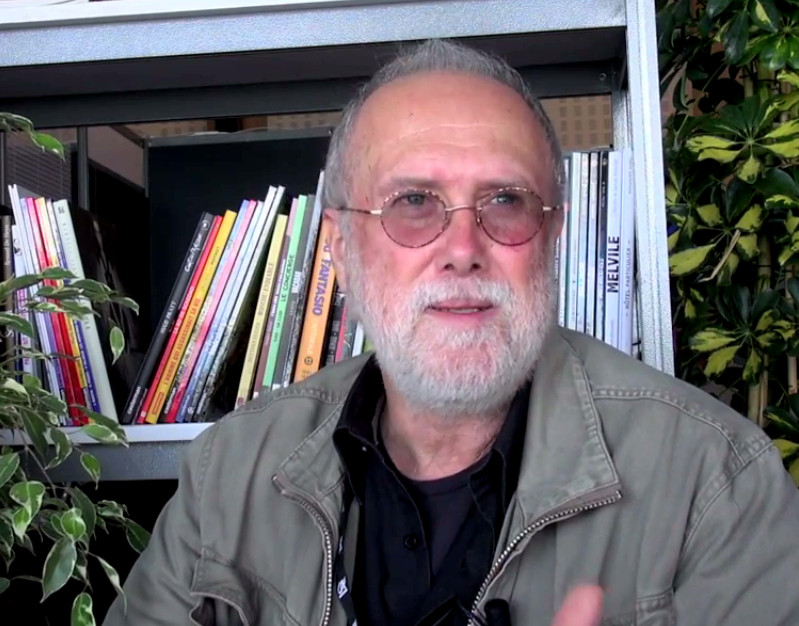
- Born: December 13, 1944 (age 81)
- Areas: Writer, Artist
- Pseudonym: Léo

Luiz Eduardo de Oliveira (born December 13, 1944), more famous under his pen name Léo is a Brazilian comics creator.

== Biography ==
After graduating as a mechanical engineer, Oliveira left Brazil because of the then military dictatorship. He lived in Chile until the Chilean coup of 1973, then in Argentina, before returning to Brazil in 1974. He worked as an illustrator in the advertising industry in São Paulo before once more leaving Brazil, this time for France, in 1981. He had hoped to find work illustrating comics, but the Franco-Belgian comics industry was in difficulty at the time so he fell back on advertising once again, with a few comics pieces being published in L'Écho des savanes and Pilote.

In 1986, with the assistance of Jean-Claude Forest, Oliveira began contributing to the youth oriented magazines of Bayard Presse. He illustrated true stories for Okapi magazine. He then recounted Mahatma Gandhi's life in the album Gandhi, le pèlerin de la paix, for Astrapi. In 1988, he began illustrating the stories of the comics writer Rodolphe. The collaboration proved fruitful, producing eight albums in the series Trent and five of another series, Kenya.

In 1993, Oliveira finally achieved a dream when Dargaud agreed to publish his first solo (writer-artist) series: Aldébaran. This story has continued in the sequel series Bételgeuse and Antarès, the former nominated for the Prize for a Series at the Angoulême International Comics Festival in 2004.

== Bibliography ==
Le Pèlerin de la Paix

Script by Benoît Marchon, artwork by Léo; Éditions du Centurion

1. Gandhi, le Pèlerin de la Paix - (Gandhi, the Pilgrim of Peace) (1989)

Trent

Script by Rodolphe, artwork by Léo; Dargaud (in French), Cinebook Ltd (in English)

1. L'Homme Mort - (The Dead Man) (1991, republished in 2000)
2. Le Kid - (The Kid) (1992)
3. Quand s'Allument les Lampes... - (When the Lamps Ignite) (1993, republished in 2000)
4. La Vallée de la Peur - (The Valley of Fear) (1995)
5. Wild Bill (1996)
6. Le Pays sans Soleil - (The Country without Sun) (1998)
7. Miss (1999)
8. Petit Trent - (Little Trent) (2000)(com

Kenya / Les Missions Fantastiques de Kathy Austin

Kenya
Script by Rodolphe and Léo, artwork by Léo, colour by Scarlett Smulkowski; Dargaud (in French), Cinebook Ltd (in English)
1. Apparitions (2001)
2. Rencontres (2003)
3. Aberrations (2004)
4. Interventions (2006)
5. Illusions (2008)
6. Intégrale (complete edition, 2009)

Namibia
Script by Rodolphe and Léo, artwork by Bertrand Marchal, colour by Sébastien Bouët; Dargaud (in French), Cinebook Ltd (in English)
1. Episode 1 (2010)
2. Episode 2 (2010)
3. Episode 3 (2012)
4. Episode 4 (2013)
5. Episode 5 (2015)

Amazonie (Amazon)
Script by Rodolphe and Léo, artwork by Bertrand Marchal; Dargaud (in French)
1. Episode 1 (September 2016)
2. Episode 2 (August 2017)
3. Episode 3 (April 2018)
4. Episode 4 (February 2019)
5. Episode 5 (February 2020)

Scotland
Script by Rodolphe and Léo, artwork by Bertrand Marchal; Dargaud (in French)
1. Episode 1 (March 2022)
2. Episode 2 (February 2023)

Dexter London

Script by Léo, artwork by Sergio Garcia Sanchez; Dargaud

1. Aventurier Professionnel (2002)
2. La Traversée du Désert (2003)
3. Les Sources du Rouandiz (2005)

Les Mondes d'Aldébaran (Worlds of Aldebaran)

Script and artwork by Léo; Dargaud (in French), Cinebook Ltd (in English)

Aldébaran (Aldebaran)
1. La Catastrophe - (The Catastrophe) (1994, republished in 2001)
2. La Blonde - (The Blond Woman) (1995, republished in 2001)
3. La Photo - (The Photograph) (1996, republished in 2001)
4. Le Groupe - (The Group) (1997, republished in 2001)
5. La Créature - (The Creature) (1998, republished in 2001)

Bételgeuse (Betelgeuse)
1. La Planète - (The Planet) (2000)
2. Les Survivants - (The Survivors) (2001)
3. L'expédition - (The Expedition) (2002)
4. Les Cavernes - (The Caves) (2003)
5. L'autre - (The Other) (2005)

Antares - (released in English by Cinebook)
1. Episode 1 (2007)
2. Episode 2 (2009)
3. Episode 3 (2010)
4. Episode 4 (2011)
5. Episode 5 (2013)
6. Episode 6 (2015)

Les survivants (Survivors) - (released in English by Cinebook)
1. Episode 1 (2011)
2. Episode 2 (2012)
3. Episode 3 (2014)
4. Episode 4 (2016)

Retour sur Aldebaran (Return to Aldebaran)
1. Episode 1 (2018)
2. Episode 2 (2019)
3. Episode 3 (2020)

Neptune
1. Episode 1 (2022)
2. Episode 2 (2022)

Bellatrix
1. Episode 1 (2023)

Terres Lointaines

Script by Léo, artwork by Icar; Dargaud (in French), Cinebook Ltd (in English, under the title Distant Worlds)

1. Episode 1 (2009)
2. Episode 2 (2009)
3. Episode 3 (2010)
4. Episode 4 (2011)
5. Episode 5 (2012)

Ultime Frontière

Script by Léo, artwork by Icar; Dargaud (in French)

1. Episode 1, September 2014

Mermaid Project

Script by Léo and Corine Jamar, artwork by Fred Simon; Dargaud (in French), Cinebook Ltd (in English)

1. Tome 1, September 2012
2. Tome 2, June 2013
3. Tome 3, June 2014
4. Tome 4, 2015
5. Tome 5, 2017

Mutations

Script by Léo and Corine Jamar, artwork by Fred Simon; Dargaud (in French), Cinebook Ltd (in English)

1. Tome 1, 2018
2. Tome 1, 2020

Demain
Script by Rodolphe and Léo, artwork by Louis Alloing; Delcourt (in French)

1. Acte 1, 2022
2. Acte 2, 2022
3. Acte 3, 2023

La Porte de Brazenac

Script by Léo and Rodolphe, artwork by Patrick Pion; Dargaud (not yet published in English)

- single album, February 2014

== Awards ==
- 2004: nominated for Best International Series at the Prix Saint-Michel, Belgium

- nominated for the Youth Award (9-12 years) and the Series Award at the Angoulême International Comics Festival, France
