= Cheval Noir (mountain) =

Mountain in the French Alps

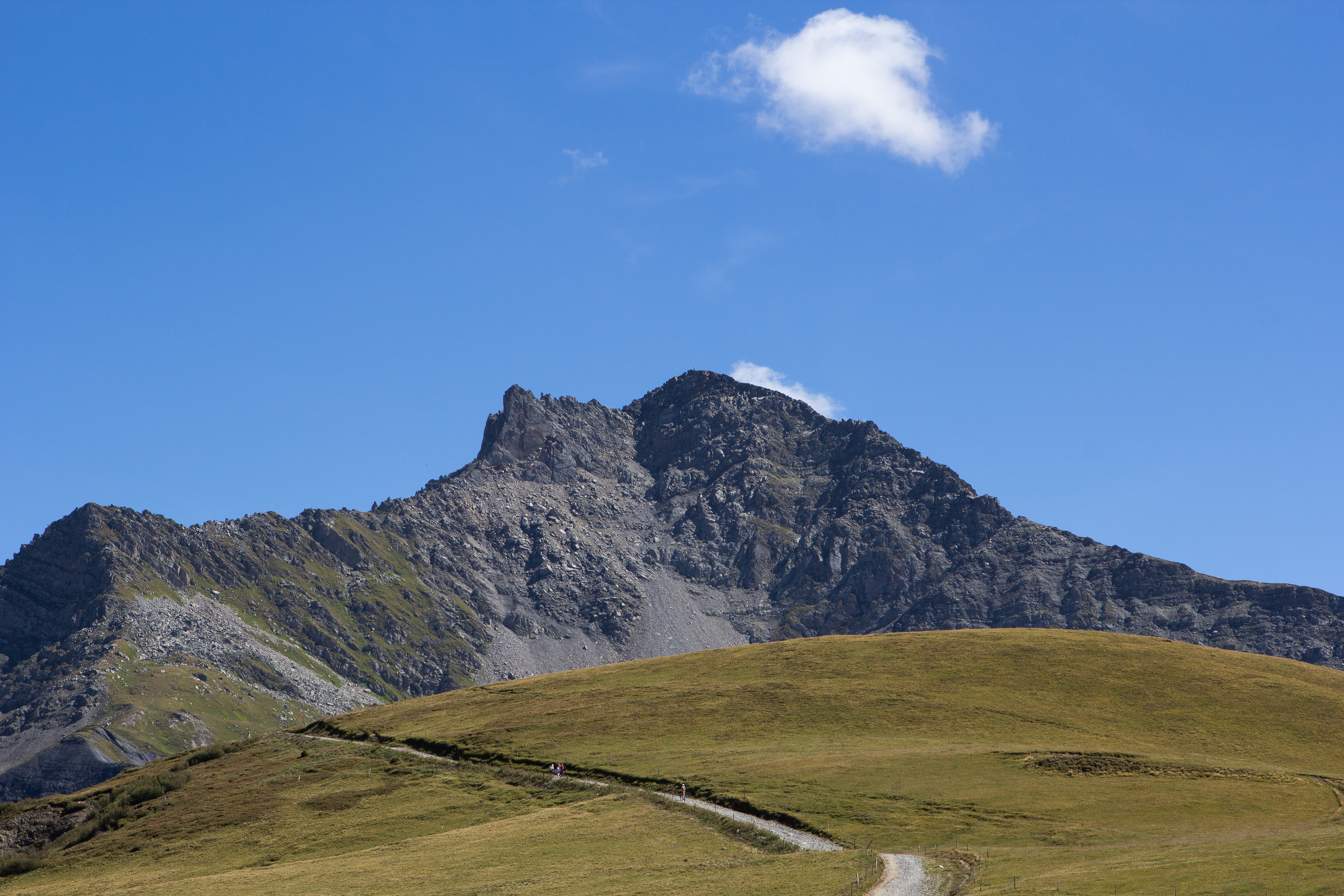

Highest point
- Elevation: 2,832 m (9,291 ft)
- Coordinates: 45°25′19″N 6°24′49″E

Geography
- Location within Alps
- Location: Alps

Cheval Noir is a mountain in the French Alps, in the Savoie department. It lies between Moûtiers in the north east and La Chambre in the south west. It is 2832 m high.

The mountain is the namesake for the geologic Cheval Noir unit, an accretionary wedge that formed during the subduction of the Valais ocean (or North Penninic ocean).
