= Soleil Productions =

French comic book publishing company

- Type: Private
- Industry: Publishing
- Founder: Mourad Boudjellal
- Headquarters: Toulon, Var, P.A.C.A., France
- Area served: French-speaking countries
- Key people: Jean Wacquet, Editor-in-chief; Mourad Boudjellal, Publisher; Christophe Arleston, Periodical Editor-in-Chief
- Products: Bandes dessinées Comics; Manga
- Parent: DelSol distribution (with Delcourt); Fusion Comics (with Panini)
- Website: www.editions-soleil.fr

Soleil Productions is a French publisher of both original and imported comic books.

== History ==
Soleil was founded in 1989 in Toulouse by Mourad Boudjellal.

Soleil quickly became known as a publisher of cartoons and parodies such as Rahan, Blek le Roc et Tarzan. It soon went into the heroic fantasy.

In the 1994, it picked up and published the Lanfeust comic series. Lanfeust became a rapid and huge success and propelled the Toulouse publishing house to the rank of the largest French comic book publishers.

=== Partnerships and collaborations ===
In 2004, Soleil and Delcourt created a joint venture called DelSol, a partnership distribution society for France, Belgium and other Francophone countries.

In 2008, Marvel Comics collaborated with the publisher on English translations of several of their titles, including Sky Doll, Universal War One, Samurai: Legend, Scourge of the Gods and Ythaq: The Forsaken World.

In 2008, Panini and Soleil created a joint venture called Fusion Comics in order to diffuse some U.S. comics (like Dark Tower or World of Warcraft) into the French-language countries market.

In June 2011, Mourad Boudjellal sold all of his shares to Delcourt editions.

== List of current titles ==
=== Bandes dessinées ===
Original and licensed properties published under the labels Soleil, Quadrants, Soleil Levant, Soleil Celtic, Start, Métamorphose, etc.

- Aberzen (4 issues)
- Les Ailes du Phaéton (9 issues)
- Akron (1 issue)
- Aleph (3 issues)
- Angeline (4 issues)
- Angor (3 issues)
- Les Arcanes du Midi-Minuit (8 issues)
- L'Assassin Royal (5 issues)
- Atalante (4 issues)
- Les Aventures du Gottferdom Studio (4 issues)
- Bad Legion (1 issue)
- Billy Brouillard (1 issue)
- Le Bleu du ciel (2 issues)
- Les Blondes (14 issues)
- Les Brumes d'Asceltis (3 issues)
- Cañari (2 issues)
- Les Carnets Secrets du Vatican (3 issues)
- Cixi de Troy (3 issue)
- Les Conquérants de Troy (2 issues)
- CrossFire (5 issues)
- Le Dernier Troyen (6 issues)
- Les Échaudeurs des Ténèbres (2 issues)
- Le Feul (3 issues)
- Les Feux d'Askell (3 issues)
- Le Fléau des Dieux (6 issues)
- La Geste des Chevaliers-Dragons (12 issues)
- Le Grimoire de Féerie (2 issues)
- Héroïc Pizza (5 issues)
- Hana Attori (3 issues)
- Husk (4 issues)
- les Insurgés d’Edaleth (3 issues)
- Kookaburra, K, Universe (6+2+10 issues)
- Lanfeust de Troy (8 issues)
- Lanfeust des Etoiles (8 issues)
- Lanfeust Odyssey (2 issue)
- Léo Loden (20 issues)
- Luuna (7 issues)
- La Marche du Crabe (2 issues)
- Marlysa (11 issues)
- Moréa (6 issues)
- Les Naufragés d'Ythaq (9 issues)
- Nocturnes Rouges (6 issues)
- One of Us (2 issues)
- Paradis Perdu (7 issues)
- Rahan (22 issues)
- Servitude (3 issues)
- Sha (3 issues)
- Sky Doll (4 issues)
- Slhoka (4 issues)
- Le Syndrome de Caïn (5 issues)
- Trolls de Troy (12 issues)
- UW1 (6 issues)
- Verseau (2 issues)
- Yiu (7 issues)
- Zéro Absolu (3 issues)
- Zorn & Dirna (3 issues)

=== Comics ===
(Licensed properties) Published by Soleil / Fusion Comics:

- Breathe (1 issue)
- Buffy contre les vampires, Saison une (2 issues)
- Buffy contre les vampires, Saison huit (4 issues)
- Conan (8 Issues)
- Danger Girl (2 Issues)
- Emily the Strange (2 issues)
- Federal Vampire and Zombie Agency (1 issue)
- GameKeeper (1 issue)
- Gears of War (1 issue)
- Jackie Foxxx (1 issue)
- MetalGear Solid (2 issues)
- Ramayan (2 issues)
- Révélations (3 issues)
- 7 Brothers (2 issues)
- Snake Woman (1 issue)
- La Tour Sombre (5 issues)
- TransFormers (2 issues)
- Voodoo Child (2 issues)
- Wanderers (1 issue)
- Warhammer (6 issues)
- WarHammer 40 000 (6 issues)
- World of Warcraft (5 issues)
- X-Files (1 issue)

=== Manga and manhwa ===
(Licensed & original properties) Published by Végétal Manga / Soleil Manga

- Advent (2 issues)
- Akari (8 issues)
- Azamaru (4 issues)
- Ange, Mode d'Emploi (6 issues)
- B-Boy Bomb (6 issues)
- Battle Royale (15 issues)
- Blitz Royale (2 issues)
- Beauty Pop (8 issues)
- Burning Moon (4 issues)
- Bienvenue dans la N.H.K. (7 issues)
- Blank (3 issues)
- Blood Rain (9 issues)
- Bus for Spring (3 issues)
- Castlevania (2 issues)
- C'était nous (12 issues)
- Complex (7 issues)
- Cyber idol Mink (6 issues)
- Δ Saga (2 issues)
- Les Dessins de la Vie (1 issue)
- Diabolo (3 issues)
- Doors of Chaos (2 issues)
- Don Dracula (2 issues)
- Dorohedoro (7 issues)
- Les Enfants de Saphir (1 issue)
- L'Escadrille des Nuages (4 issues)
- F – the Perfect Insider (1 issue)
- Full Set (3 issues)
- God Save the Queen (1 issue)
- Gothic Sports (3 issues)
- Hakoniwa Angel (4 issues)
- Hello Harajuku Story (1 issue)
- Higanjima (8 issues)
- High School Girls (9 issues)
- High School Paradise (11 issues)
- Iron Wok Jan ! R (4 issues)
- Itadakimasu (4 issues)
- Kamui, end of Ark
- Kana & Kanji (4 issues)
- Le Labyrinthe de Morphée (1 issue)
- Lanfeust Quest (5 issues)
- Larmes de Samouraï (2 issues)
- The Legend of Zelda: Oracle of Seasons and Oracle of Ages (2 issues)
- Lives (2 issues)
- Living in a Happy World (2 issues)
- Love instruction – How to become a seductor (3 issues)
- Loveless (8 issues)
- Lovey Dovey (5 issues)
- Ma Petite Maitresse (4 issues)
- MegaCity 909 (2 issues)
- Pita-Ten (8 issues)
- Princesse Saphir (3 issues)
- Samurai Champloo (2 issues)
- The Tarot Café (3 issues)
- Triton (3 issues)
- Venus Versus Virus (2 issues)
- Warcraft: Le Puits Solaire (3 issues)

=== Periodicals ===
- Lanfeust Mag (monthly – since 1998), (#144 in November 2008)

=== Artbooks and collectibles ===
- Les Filles de Soleil (13 issues)

== See also ==
- Franco-Belgian publishing houses
- List of Franco-Belgian comic series
