= Théodore Poussin =

Belgian comic series

- Main character with the series logo
- Author(s): Frank Le Gall, Yann
- Illustrator(s): Frank Le Gall
- Current status/schedule: Running
- Launch date: 1987
- Publisher(s): Dupuis
- Genre(s): Adventure, historical comics

Théodore Poussin is a Franco-Belgian comics book series created by the French writer Frank Le Gall.

== Summary ==
Dunkirk, 1927. Young Théodore Poussin, an office worker in a shipping company, dreams of going to sea and going on an adventure. He joins the crew of the Cap Padaran as a student commissary, and follows the footsteps of his uncle, Charles Steene, who went missing and was supposed to have died in 1916 in Haiphong. He is unaware that he will not see Dunkirk and his loved ones again for three years, during which he will experience many adventures, working in various professions, from Singapore to Makassar.

== Awards ==
- Angoulême International Comics Festival Prize for Best Album: 1989
- Max und Moritz Award: 1992
- Angoulême International Comics Festival Prize: 1993

== Albums ==
1. Capitaine Steene (1987)
2. Le Mangeur d'Archipels (1987)
3. Marie Vérité (1988)
4. 4 Secrets (1990)
5. Le Trésor du rajah blanc (1991)
6. Un passager porté disparu (1992)
7. La Vallée des roses (1993)
8. La Maison dans l'île (1994)
9. La Terrasse des audiences 1 (1995)
10. La Terrasse des audiences 2 (1997)
11. Novembre toute l'année (2000)
12. Les Jalousies (2005)
13. Le Dernier Voyage de l'Amok (2018)
14. Aro Satoe (2023)
