= Andreas (comics) =

German comics writer

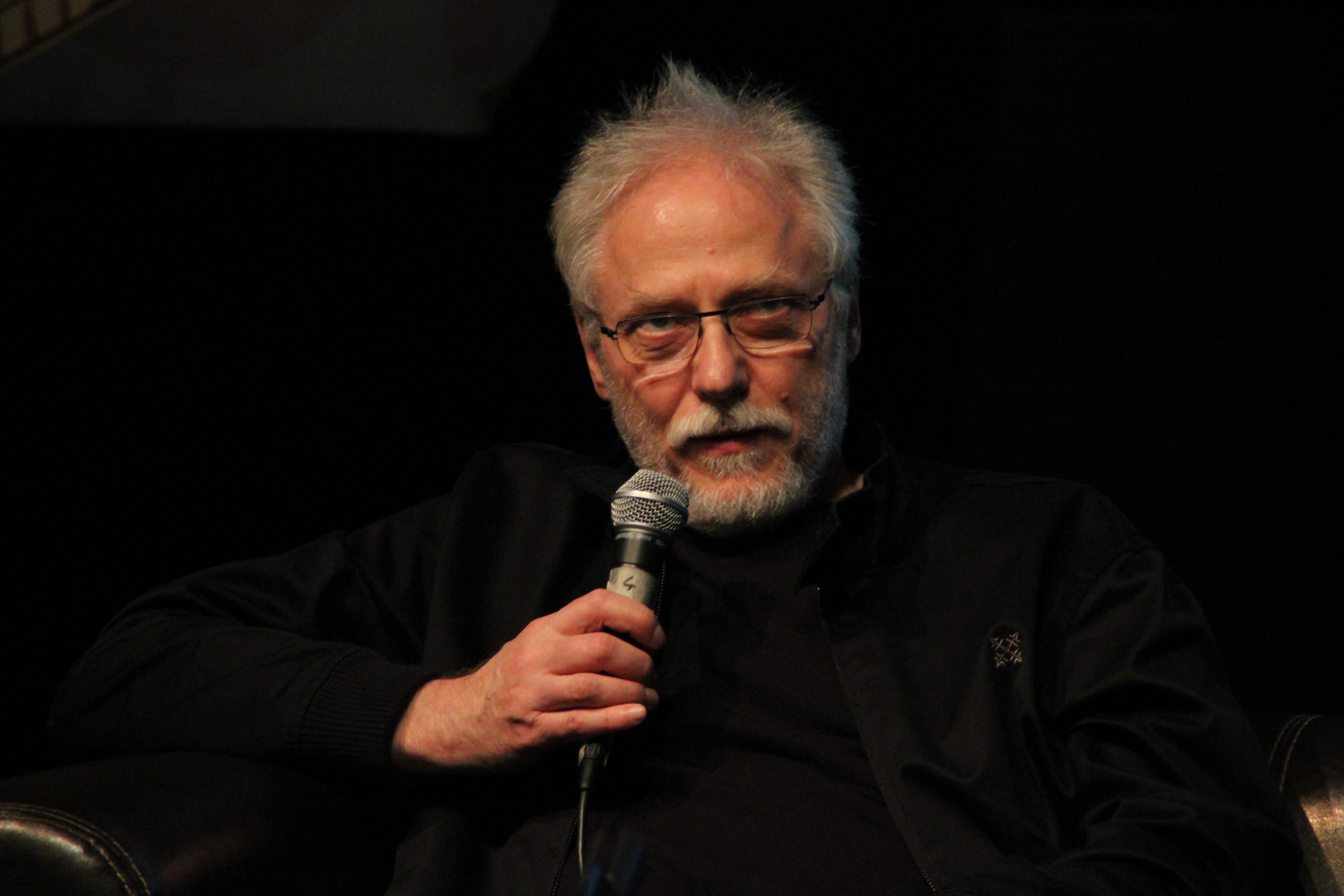
- Andreas at the Angoulême International Comics Festival 2013
- Born: Andreas Martens; 3 January 1951 (age 75) Weißenfels, Germany
- Areas: artist, writer, colourist
- Pseudonym: Andreas
- Notable works: Cromwell Stone; Capricornus; Rork
- Awards: Prix Bonnet d’âne

Andreas, pen name for Andreas Martens, born 3 January 1951 in Weißenfels (Germany). Martens studied in Düsseldorf at the Academy of Fine Arts and at the St. Luc comics school in Belgium, assisting Eddy Paape on Udolfo, before relocating to France.

He made his debut in the magazines (À suivre), Le Journal de Tintin and Heavy Metal. In 2001 he won de Prix Bonnet d’âne at the comic festival Quai des Bulles in Saint-Malo (France) for his entire oeuvre. This includes that he may draw the poster for the next festival.

His genre series include Arq, Cromwell Stone, Cyrrus, Rork and its spin-off, Capricorne, as well as a number of single works such as La Caverne du Souvenir (The Cave of Memory), Coutoo, Dérives (Adrift), Aztèques, and Révélations Posthumes (Posthumous Revelations).

== Comic books by Andreas ==
=== Cromwell Stone ===
1. Cromwell Stone (1986)
2. Le retour de Cromwell Stone (1994)
3. Le testament de Cromwell Stone (2004)

=== Cyrrus ===
1. Cyrrus (1984)
2. Mil (1987)

=== Capricorne ===
1. L'Objet (1996)
2. Electricité (1996)
3. Deliah (1997)
4. Le cube numérique (1998)
5. Le secret (1999)
6. Attaque (2001)
7. Le Dragon bleu (2002)
8. Tunnel (2003)
9. Le passage (2004)
10. Les Chinois (2005)

11. Patrick (2006)
12. --No Title-- (2007)
13. Rêve en cage (2008)
14. L'Operation (2009)
15. New York (2011)
16. Vu de près (2012)
17. Les Cavaliers (2013)
18. Zarkan (2014)
19. Terminus (2015)
20. Maître (2017)

=== Rork ===
0. Les fantômes (2012)
1. Fragments (1984)
2. Passages (1983)
3. Le cimetière de cathédrales (1988)
4. Lumière d'étoile (1988)

5. Capricorne (1990)
6. Descente (1992)
7. Retour (1993)
8. Les oubliés (2002)

=== Arq ===
1. Ailleurs (1997)
2. Mémoires 1 (1998)
3. Mémoires 2 (1999)
4. Racken (2000)
5. White Dust (2001)
6. Réveil (2002)

7. Dorro Zengu (2003)
8. Retrouvailles (2005)
9. Feu Croisé (2006)
10. Tehos (2007)
11. Maître noir (2008)
12. Mission (2009)

13. Détectives (2010)
14. Intrus (2011)
15. Lune (2012)
16. Rêves 1(2013)
17. Rêves 2 (2014)
18. Ici (2015)

=== Mobilis ===
(With Christian Durieux)

1. Heurts (2000) (ISBN 2-84055-409-7)
2. Seconde Chance (2001) (ISBN 2-84055-550-6)
3. Manipulations minutieuses (2002) (ISBN 2-84055-818-1)

== Books about Andreas ==
1. Yves Lacroix et Philippe Sohet (dir.), Andreas. Une Monographie, Mosquito, 1997
2. Yves Lacroix et Philippe Sohet, L'Ambition narrative. Parcours dans l'œuvre d'Andreas, Éditions XYZ, 1999 (ISBN 2892612667)
