= Christophe Arleston =

French comics writer and editor (born 1963)

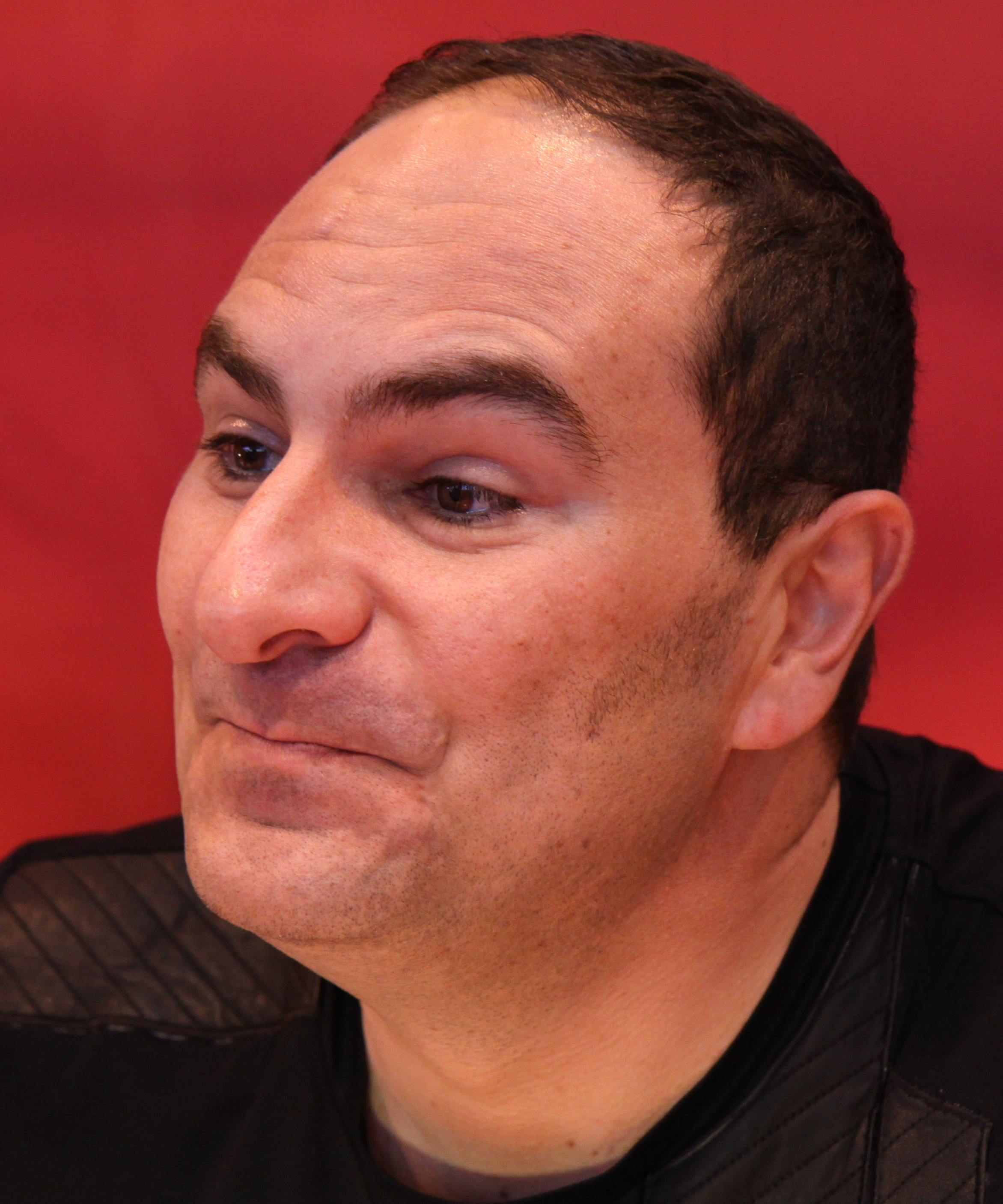
- Christophe Arleston in March 2010
- Born: Christophe Pelinq; 14 August 1963 (age 63); Aix-en-Provence, France
- Writing career
- Pen name: Scotch Arleston

Christophe Arleston (born Christophe Pelinq, 14 August 1963) is a French comics writer and editor. He has also worked as Scotch Arleston.

== Biography ==
In his early childhood, Christophe Arleston lived in Madagascar, Macon and Paris before returning to Aix-en-Provence. He studied journalism at Marseille. He started his career by working as a journalist and later in communications. He started writing radio drama for France Inter.

In 1992 he started writing comic books for Soleil Productions. In 1994 he published Lanfeust of Troy. In 1998 he created Lanfeust Mag, a monthly comic strip. Since 2021, he is the head of Drakoo Editions, a fantasy comics publishing house.

In 2010, he was the bestselling comics author in France, with 1.5 million albums sold that year. Between 1980 and 2023, he was estimated to have sold 15 million albums.

== Awards ==
- Prix Humour at festival de Solliès-Ville 1993 for Léo Loden T.3 : Adieu ma joliette
- Prix Jeunesse at festival d’Illzach 1993 and prix Microfolie’s at festival de Maisons-Laffitte for Léo Loden T.4 : Grillade provençale
- Prix du meilleur scénario at festival de Chambéry 1998 for Trolls de Troy T.2 : Le Scalp du vénérable
- Won the Alph-Art Jeunesse 9–12 ans at Angoulême International Comics Festival
  - 1998 for Trolls de Troy T.1 : Histoires trolles
  - 2000 for Lanfeust de Troy T.7 : Les pétaures se cachent pour mourir
  - 2002 for Trolls de Troy T.5 : Les Maléfices de la Thaumaturge
- Prix jeunesse at la Foire du livre de Saint-Louis in 2011 for Lord of Burger
- Prix Livrentête 2011, for Lord of Burger

== Bibliography ==
- Lanfeust of Troy (8 tomes with Didier Tarquin, Soleil Productions, 1994–2000)
- Lanfeust des Étoiles (8 tomes with Didier Tarquin, Soleil Productions, 2001–2008)
- Lanfeust Odyssey (10 tomes with Didier Tarquin, Soleil Productions, 2009–2018)
- Cixi de Troy (3 tomes with Olivier Vatine, Soleil Productions, 2009–2011)
- Trolls of Troy (with Jean-Louis Mourier, Soleil Productions, 1997–)
- Le Monde de Troy (4 tomes, Soleil Productions, 1998–2003)
- Les Conquérants de Troy (4 tomes with Ciro Tota, Soleil Productions, 2005–2014)
- Les Guerrières de Troy (2 tomes with Dany, Soleil Productions, 2010–2013)
- Légendes de Troy (9 tomes, Soleil Productions, 2009–2014)
- Gnomes de Troy (4 tomes, Soleil Productions, 2000–2014)
- Les Forêts d'Opale (12 tomes, Soleil Productions, 2000–2020)
- Ythaq: The Forsaken World (with Adrien Floch, Soleil Productions, 2005–2019)
- Ekhö Monde Miroir (10 tomes with Alessandro Barbucci, Soleil Productions, 2013–2020)
- Les Elfes Noirs (5 tomes with Daniela Dimat, Soleil Productions, 2014–2019)
- Danthrakon (3 tomes with Olivier Boiscommun, Drakoo Editions, 2019–2020)
- Les Feux d'Askell (3 tomes with Jean-Louis Mourier, Soleil Productions, 1993–1995)
- Le chant d'Excalibur (6 tomes with Eric Hübsch, Soleil Productions, 1998–2010)
- Les Maîtres Cartographes (6 tomes with Paul Glaudel, Soleil Productions, 1992–2002)
- Sinbad (3 tomes with Pierre Alary, Soleil Productions, 2008–2010)
- Elixirs (3 tomes with Alberto Varanda, Soleil Productions, 2005–2013)
- Moréa (6 tomes with Thierry Labrosse, Soleil Productions, 2000–2011)
- Mycroft Inquisitor (3 tomes with Jack Manini, Soleil Productions, 1995–1998)
- Odyxes (2 tomes with Steven Lejeune, Soleil Productions, 2014–2016)
- Léo Loden (25 tomes with Serge Carrère, Soleil Productions, 1992–2017)
- Lord of Burger (3 tomes with Alessandro Barbucci, Glénat Editions, 2010–2011)
- Tandori (3 tomes with Curd Ridel, Le Lombard, 1993–1995)
- Chimères 1887 (5 tomes with Vincent, Glénat Editions, 2011–2016)
- Sangre (4 tomes, 3 with Floc'h and nr4 with Stefano Vergani, Soleil Productions, 2016-2023, on-going)
