= Trolls of Troy =

French comic book series

Trolls of Troy is a French comic series published by Soleil Productions. It is a spin-off series of Lanfeust of Troy and is created by author Scotch Arleston and writer Jean-Louis Mourier.

Since 1997, 24 volumes have been published in French. The series is also translated in Polish, Dutch, German and Spanish. In 2013, it was adapted into an animated series.

== Synopsis ==
Troy is a world populated by humans, trolls and other creatures and filled with magic. The trolls are physically strong, and viewed by humans as wild animals, but they are civilized from their own point of view.

Trolls of Troy is set two centuries before the story of Lanfeust. It tells the story of Teträm, a brave troll, and his adopted human daughter, Waha. Men have decided to exterminate the trolls, and have formed a group of hunters with terrible powers. Teträm, must find a way to save his people.

== Adaptation ==
In 2003, Dargaud Marina and M6 announced plans to adapt the comics into a 26 x 24-minute traditionally animated television series budgeted at $5.9 million. That version would ultimately not be released. In 2012, Futurikon and Groupe Canal+ revealed a 78 x 7-minute animated series developed by Vincent Bonjour, Guillaume Enard and Cyril Tysz and aimed at a younger audience. It debuted December 1, 2013 on Canal+ Family in France. The series would later run on Canal J and Gulli.
