= List of Redbeard albums =

Redbeard is a series of Belgian comic books, originally published in French, created by writer Jean-Michel Charlier and artist Victor Hubinon. After their deaths the series was continued by other writers and artists, including Jijé (Joseph Gillain), Christian Gaty, Patrice Pellerin, Jean Ollivier, Christian Perrissin and Marc Bourgne.

The albums have been published in France, Finland, Belgium, The Netherlands, Germany, Denmark, former Yugoslavia (in the Serbo-Croatian language) and Croatia.

This list gives the published albums in chronological order. The years are from their first publication in French.

- 1: The Broken Compass (1959, "Le démon des Caraïbes")
- 2: The Horror Of The Seven Seas (1960, "Le roi des sept mers")
- 3: The Young Captain (1979, "Le jeune capitaine") * also contains two short prequel stories:
  - The Gold Of The "San Christobal"
  - The Cobra
- 4: The Captain Without A Name (1961, Le fils de Barbe-Rouge)
- 5: The Brand Of The King (1961, Défi au roi)
- 6: Mutiny On The "Ocean" (1965, Les révoltés de l'Océane)
- 7: The Ghost Ship (1966, Le vaisseau fantôme)
- 8: Dead Man's Island (1967, L’Île de l’homme mort)
- 9: The Spanish Ambush (1968, Le piège Espagnol)
- 10: The Downfall Of The "Black Falcon" (1969, La fin du Faucon Noir)
- 11: The Reckoning (1970, Mort ou vif)
- 12: The Treasure Of Redbeard (1971, Le trésor de Barbe-Rouge)
- 13: The Letter Of Marque And Reprisal (1971, La mission secrète de l'épervier)
- 14: The Liberation Of Fort-de-France (1972, Barbe-Rouge à la rescousse)
- 15: The Invisible Pirate (1972, Le pirate sans visage)
- 16: Fight With The Moors (1973, Khaïr le Maure)
- 17: The Prisoner (1973, La captive des Maures)
- 18: The Ship From Hell (1974, Le vaisseau de l'enfer)
- 19: Hellfire (1979, Raid sur la corne d'or)
- 20: Island Of The Missing Ships (1980, L'Île des vaisseaux perdus)
- 21: The Missing Of The "Black Falcon" (1982, Les disparus du Faucon Noir)
- 22: The Cursed Gold Of Huacapac (1984, L'or maudit des Huacapac)
- 23: The City Of Death (1987, La cité de la mort)
- 24: Con in Ebony (1983, Trafiquants de bois d'ébène)
- 25: Uprise In Jamaica (1987, Les révoltés de la Jamaïque)
- 26: Pirates in Indian Waters (1991, Pirates en mer des Indes)
- 27: The Grand-Mongol (1992, La fiancée du Grand Moghol")
- 28: The Pirate Of The "Merciless'' (1994, La flibustière du 'Sans-Pitié)
- 29: Fight Over Tortuga (1995, A nous la Tortue)
- 30: Gold And Glory (1996, L'or et la gloire)
- 31: The War Of The Pirates (1997, La guerre des pirates)
- 32: The Shadow Of The Devil (1999, L'ombre du démon)
- 33: The Path Of The Inca (2000, Le chemin de l'Inca)
- 34: The Secret Of Elisa Davis - part 1 (2001, Le secret d'Elisa Davies, t.1)
- 35: The Secret Of Elisa Davis - part 2 (2004, Le secret d'Elisa Davies, t.2)

== Spinoff series ==
Since 1996 there is also a spin-off series, called "The Young Years Of Readbeard", created by different authors than the main series: the scenario is by Christian Perrissin and the artist is Daniel Redondo.

These stories deal with Redbeard's youth before he was a pirate and how he decided to become one. His name is given as Jean-Baptiste Cornic, a servant of the French king. Also explained is how he lost his eye.

- The Brothers Of The Coast (1996)
- The Lion Pit (1997)
- The Duel Of The Captains (1998)
- The Island Of The Red Devil (1999)
- The Mutineers Of Port Royal (2001)
