= Deaths in January 1979 =

The following is a list of notable deaths in January 1979. Entries for each day are listed alphabetically by surname. A typical entry lists information in the following sequence:

- Name, age, country of citizenship at birth, subsequent country of citizenship (if applicable), reason for notability, cause of death (if known), and reference.

== January 1979 ==
=== 3 ===
- Conrad Hilton, 91, American hotel magnate and politician, he was a Republican representative in the first New Mexico Legislature in 1912, but he refused to run for a fourth term in 1916, instead endorsing a longtime political ally, he served in Paris in the Quartermaster Corps in the aftermath of World War I,he founded the Hilton hotel chain in 1919, when he bought his first property, the Mobley Hotel, in Cisco, Texas,death due to pneumonia.

=== 4 ===
- Peter Frankenfeld, 65, German comedian,
- Vincent Korda, 81, Hungarian-born British artist and art director, he was nominated four times for the Academy Award for Best Art Direction, winning only for The Thief of Bagdad. (1940)His other nominated films were That Hamilton Woman (1941), Jungle Book (1942),and The Longest Day (1962)

=== 5 ===
- Billy Bletcher, 84, American actor, primarily known as a voice actor,his voice was a deep, strong and booming baritone, Bletcher provided the voices of various characters for Walt Disney Productions, including his recurring roles as Black Pete and the Big Bad Wolf.
- Gabriella Giacobbe, 55, Italian actress, her stage credits included works directed by Luchino Visconti and Eduardo De Filippo,death due to cancer
- Charles Mingus, 56, American jazz upright bassist, composer, bandleader, pianist, and author, Mingus had a notoriously fiery temperament, which earned him the nickname "the Angry Man of Jazz"; his refusal to compromise his musical integrity led to many onstage outbursts, which were directed at members of his band and the audience alike,he died due to a heart attack in Cuernavaca, Mexico, where he had traveled for treatment and convalescence. His health had declined since the mid-1970s, due to the effects of motor neuron disease (also known as ALS)

=== 8 ===
- Victor Hubinon, 54, Belgian comic book artist, best known for the series Buck Danny and Redbeard,death by heart attack.

=== 11 ===
- Jack Soo, 61, American actor and singer, he was ordered into internment along with other Japanese Americans during World War II due to the passage of Executive Order 9066, and he was sent to the Topaz War Relocation Center in Utah, he was reportedly a "camp favorite" for regularly singing to entertain his fellow internees,Soo joined Motown Records in 1965 as one of their first non-African-American musicians, where he recorded a slow ballad version of "For Once in My Life" as the first male singer to do so, the song was soon after popularized through a version performed by Stevie Wonder, Soo joined the cast of the sitcom Barney Miller in 1975, portraying Detective Nick Yemana, death from esophageal cancer

=== 12 ===
- Pete Smith, 86, American film producer, he was both the producer and the narrator of a series of comedic short films known as the Pete Smith Specialties, the Pete Smith Specialties earned 14 Academy Award nominations and two Best Live Action Short Film Academy Awards, at the 26th Academy Awards (1954), Smith was awarded an Academy Honorary Award "for his witty and pungent observations on the American scene in his series of Pete Smith Specialties", Smith committed suicide by jumping off the roof of a convalescent home in Santa Monica, California.

=== 13 ===
- Donny Hathaway, 33, American soul singer, keyboardist, songwriter, backing vocalist, and arranger,his third album Roberta Flack & Donny Hathaway (1972) was an album of duets with his former university associate and label mate Roberta Flack, the album was a critical and commercial success, including the Ralph MacDonald-penned track "Where Is the Love", which proved to be not only an R&B success, but also scored Top Five on the pop Hot 100, the album sold over one million copies, and was awarded a gold disc by the Recording Industry Association of America (RIAA) on September 5, 1972, he committed suicide by jumping off the 15th floor of New York City's Essex House luxury hotel.Hours before his death, Hathwaway was reportedly acting paranoid during a recording session, convinced that unnamed consirators had connected his brain to a machine for the purpose of stealing his music and his voice.
- Emiko Yagumo, 75, Japanese silent film actress,she was an icon of the modan gāru (modern girl) subculture in Japan and featured on advertisements for cosmetics, such as face powder.

=== 14 ===
- Thomas DeSimone, 32, American criminal, associated with the Lucchese crime family, he was reportedly one of the robbers in the Lufthansa heist (December 11, 1978), his disappearance was reported on this day by his wife, and he was presumed to have been murdered. It is believed that DeSimone was murdered as revenge for his role in two unsanctioned murders which had targeted John Gotti's men. Another theory is that DeSimone eventually became suspected of being a police informant and was killed by Jimmy Burke.

=== 15 ===
- Charles W. Morris, 77, American philosopher and semiotician, he was an instructor of philosophy for six years at Rice University (term 1926-1931) in Houston, Texas, viewing semiotics as a way to bridge philosophical outlooks, Morris grounded his sign theory in Mead's social behaviorism; in fact, Morris's interpretation of an interpretant, a term used in the semiotics of Charles Sanders Peirce, has been understood to be strictly psychological, Morris's system of signs emphasizes the role of stimulus and response in the orientation, manipulation, and consummation phases of action, his mature semiotic theory is traced out in Signs, Language, and Behavior (1946).

=== 16 ===
- Ted Cassidy, 46, American actor and former disc jockey and organ player,he portrayed both Lurch and Thing in the Gothic sitcom The Addams Family,he voiced Injun Joe in the fantasy television series The New Adventures of Huckleberry Finn, he served as the narrator for the superhero television series The Incredible Hulk, and also provided the growls and roars for the eponymous character Hulk for the first two seasons,death due to complications from a heart surgery.

=== 17 ===
- Peter Butterworth, 63, British actot and comedian, he portrayed the Meddling Monk in two First Doctor Doctor Who stories in 1965 and 1966, The Time Meddler and The Daleks' Master Plan, he was a regular cast member in the film series Carry On,he died of a heart attack in his hotel room, shortly following his return from his last performance, in the evening's performance of a pantomime.

=== 22 ===
- Ali Hassan Salameh, 37, Palestinian militant, Salameh served as the key bridge between the Palestine Liberation Organisation (PLO) and the Central Intelligence Agency (CIA) from 1970 until his death, after being recruited as a CIA asset by Robert Ames; the PLO, at the request of the United States, had undertaken steps to help ensure the security of the American Embassy and Salameh responded by posting a PLO guard unit there, he was assassinated by the Mossad, with his death being part of a retaliation campaign intended to assassinate individuals accused of being involved in the 1972 Munich massacre, Salameh was mortally injured by a car bomb.The detonation left Salameh conscious, but severely wounded and in great pain, having pieces of steel shrapnel embedded in his head and throughout his body. He was rushed to the American University of Beirut, where he died on the operating table.

=== 24 ===
- Mabel Taliaferro, 91, American actress,formerly a child actress, Taliaferro began acting on stage at age 2,in 1911, her film career began with the Selig Studios in The Three of Us and the film version of Cinderella

=== 25 ===
- Fred Aldrich, 74, American actorhe had guest star roles in several television series, including Gunsmoke.
- Dick Crockett, 63, American actor, stunt performer, and stunt coordinator, he portrayed an unnamed President of the United States in the crime comedy film The Pink Panther Strikes Again (1976),with the character's appearance based on then-current U.S. president Gerald Ford, as Crockett bore a marked physical and vocal resemblance to Ford, Crockett reportedly died of a heart attack. According to Julie Andrews, in her memoir Home Work, Crockett actually died by suicide due to having been diagnosed with cancer, and he left behind a suicide note.
- Robertson Hare, 87, English actor,he rose to fame in the aftermath of World War I, by regularly performing supporting roles in the Aldwych farces,his typical role in those farces was that of a "prissy little man" who is shocked and bewildered by distressing situations, Hare reportedly became one of the premier exponents of the English farce.

=== 26 ===
- Nelson Rockefeller, 70, American politician and member of the Rockefeller family, he was considered the leader of the Rockefeller Republicans, a moderate to liberal political faction of the Republican Party (GOP),he served as the governor of New York from 1959 until 1973, he served as the vice president of the United States from 1974 until 1977,Rockefeller's time as vice president was marked by his strong support for the Vietnam War, a position that aligned him with the Military–industrial complex, even as public sentiment turned against the conflict, Rockefeller remained a proponent of continued U.S. military involvement; his unwavering stance on Vietnam reflected his broader connection to elite circles, which were exposed by the Pentagon Papers (1971),he died from complications of a heart attack.

=== 27 ===
- Victoria Ocampo, 88, Argentine writer, publisher, and intellectual, she was the founder (1931) and publisher of the magazine Sur, the most important literary magazine of its time in Latin America,she was nominated for the Nobel Prize in Literature twice, in 1970 and 1974.
- Richard Wesson, 59, announcer for both films and television, he started his career in radio during the late 1940s, when he served as an announcer for the science fiction radio series Space Patrol, which aired from 1949 to 1955,he subsequently served as the primary announcer for a number of Disney anthology television series, Wesson's voice played a pivotal role in shaping Disney's brand identity during the formative decades of its television anthology and the debut of Disneyland, fostering a sense of excitement and familiarity for families tuning in or visiting the theme park,he committed suicide by gunshot, while struggling with terminal cancer.

=== 30 ===
- Harry Cort, 70, Polish actor and conman,he was born to a noble family, but falsely claimed the rights to the princely title and the coat of arms of the long-extinct Gedyminowicz-Bielski family, punished by his own father for both fraud and homosexual affairs, Cort was subsequently arrested for drug possession in 1935 Paris,migrating to New York in 1940, Cort presented himself as a pretender to the Polish throne and the chairman of a fictitious aid organization for war victims, he was ruined financially due to a long-term legal dispute with his ex-wife,in 1951, he was sentenced by a court to 180 days in prison for petty theft, vagrancy and "indecent sexual conduct",though he received a small amount from the sale of one his late father's estates, Cort died in poverty.

=== 31 ===
- Celia Adler, 89, American actress, she was almost exclusively a stage actress,originally a child actress in the Yiddish theater, Adler distanced herself from the theater for a time during her teenage years, but then resumed her acting career in 1909 under the alias "Celia Feinman", with the encouragement of her fellow actress Bertha Kalisch, during her career, Adler created leading roles in Yiddish versions of many classic plays, including the work of Gerhart Hauptmann, Hermann Sudermann, Henrik Ibsen, George Bernard Shaw and William Shakespeare,her death was caused by a stroke.
- Basil Dignam, 73, English actor, he often portrayed authority figures in his roles, such as police officers, army generals, or peers,he portrayed Stephen Gardiner, Bishop of Winchester in the historical drama series The Six Wives of Henry VIII.

== Sources ==
- Ainsworth, John, ed. (2016). "The Crusade, The Space Museum, The Chase and The Time Meddler". Doctor Who: The Complete History. 5 (11). London: Panini Comics, Hachette Partworks. ISSN 2057-6048.
- Kallenbach, Joseph Ernest (1977). American State Governors, 1776-1976. Oceana Publications. ISBN 978-0-379-00665-0.
- Reiter, Howard. "Intra-Party Cleavages in the United States Today". Western Political Quarterly 34 (1981): 287–300.
- Ross, Robert (2002). The Carry On Companion. London: Batsford. ISBN 978-0-7134-8771-8.
- Trussler, Simon (2000). The Cambridge Illustrated History of British Theatre. Cambridge University Press. ISBN 0521419131.
