= Nuclear Alert (Buck Danny) =

Nuclear Alert is the thirteenth story arc in Buck Danny, a Franco-Belgian comic book series by Jean-Michel Charlier and Francis Bergèse.

== Publication history ==
Like the rest of "Buck Danny," Nuclear Alert was originally published in several (three) different novels before being made into a single album during the nineties. The three novels were Mission Apocalypse, Les Pilotes de l'Enfer (The Pilots from Hell), and Le Feu du Ciel (Fire From Heaven), in 1982, 1983 and 1985 respectively.

== Plot ==
=== Mission Apocalypse ===
Most of the novel follows two separate plots, one for the protagonists and one for the villains. The former - Buck Danny, Jerry Tumbler and Sonny Tuckson - are now pilots on the USS John F. Kennedy and have recently transferred to flying F-14 Tomcats. The trio of pilots is temporarily reassigned from their training exercises in the Caribbean, to represent the United States at an air show in the fictional Central American nation of Managua.

Meanwhile, Interpol and U.S. intelligence have been observing an increase in criminal actions throughout the world, which they believe are being committed by the same people. They are revealed to be an anti-capitalist terrorist organization, which steals three nuclear weapons from the U.S. Air Force during the novel and plans to use them to wipe out the upcoming North–South Summit in Cancun, hosting all the major world leaders outside of the Eastern Bloc and China.

The two plot lines are joined at the end of the novel, when the terrorists - having hired Lady X, the heroes' nemesis - succeed in stealing two of the three F-14s in Managua, which they intend to use as a delivery system for the bombs (the F-14 being the plane best capable of penetrating the security screens that will surround the conference). Danny is ordered to Washington to give his report of the events.

=== The Pilots from Hell ===
Following the events of the previous novel, the President of the United States (Ronald Reagan) is contacted by the terrorists. Identifying themselves as the International Federation of Armed Revolutionary Groups, they demand the release of all terrorists currently held in NATO countries, or they will deliver the F-14s and nuclear weapons to the Soviet Union. Instead, the President decides to stall for time while the U.S. Central Intelligence Agency and other NATO services try to locate and neutralize the IFARG base.

Danny, however, believes the terrorists' demand may be a feint and that the terrorists could be planning to actually use the weapons on a target in the Western Hemisphere. CIA is skeptical, but Admiral Walker allows Danny and Tuckson nine days of shore leave, during which they rent a private aircraft and systematically overfly the deserted islands in the Caribbean where the terrorists may have hidden the Tomcats.

Meanwhile, there is dissension in the terrorists' ranks when one of their Mexican members, Juan, expresses his concern for collateral damage from the operation. In order to preserve cohesion within the group, the terrorists allow him to escape on a boobytrapped raft, thus Juan dies at sea far from the eyes of his friends. However, his body is found by Danny and Tuckson, who also find a message warning them of the IFARG's true plans. But one of the terrorist Tomcats appears and destroys their plane, along with all their communications equipment, leaving them stranded on a deserted cay and out of contact with the world.

=== Fire From Heaven ===
The novel opens with Danny and Tuckson being rescued from the cay by a Cuban fr:Classe SO-1 corvette (patrol boat), which, made suspicious by the presence of American aviators in the area, takes them both prisoner. The Americans, in desperation, force a brig break and are rescued shortly thereafter by a helicopter from Guantanamo Naval Base. They are then put in touch with Admiral Walker of the Kennedy and report what they have learned. Walker orders them back to the ship and places it on nuclear alert, but the President is due to land in a few hours and the summit can no longer be called off.

Reagan, once informed of the crisis, arranges for the media to delay news of his arrival by one hour; this allows the Kennedy to evacuate the leaders from Cancun, and to position its fighters to intercept the terrorist planes. When the IFARG, hiding in the Exuma islands, receive the delayed news of the President's arrival in Cancun, they launch the final phase of Operation Apocalypse, and release their F-14s carrying one nuclear bomb apiece.

The F-14s approach Cancun by using Cuban airspace for cover, but are detected by an American AWACS. In reaction, they split up with one turning north to attack Cape Canaveral, and one continuing towards Cancun, forcing the Kennedy's fighters to split up. Danny and the squadron's F-14s shoot down the first aircraft over Florida. Tumbler, flying an A-7 Corsair, tries to intercept the second one near Cancun but his older missiles are insufficient; instead, he crashes his fighter into the enemy, barely managing to eject before the explosion.

With Operation Apocalypse foiled, Lady X and the remaining terrorists evacuate their base and flee to safety. Danny, Tumbler and Tuckson receive the thanks of a grateful President Reagan, and will receive the Medal of Honor for their part in stopping the nuclear attack.

== Behind the scenes ==
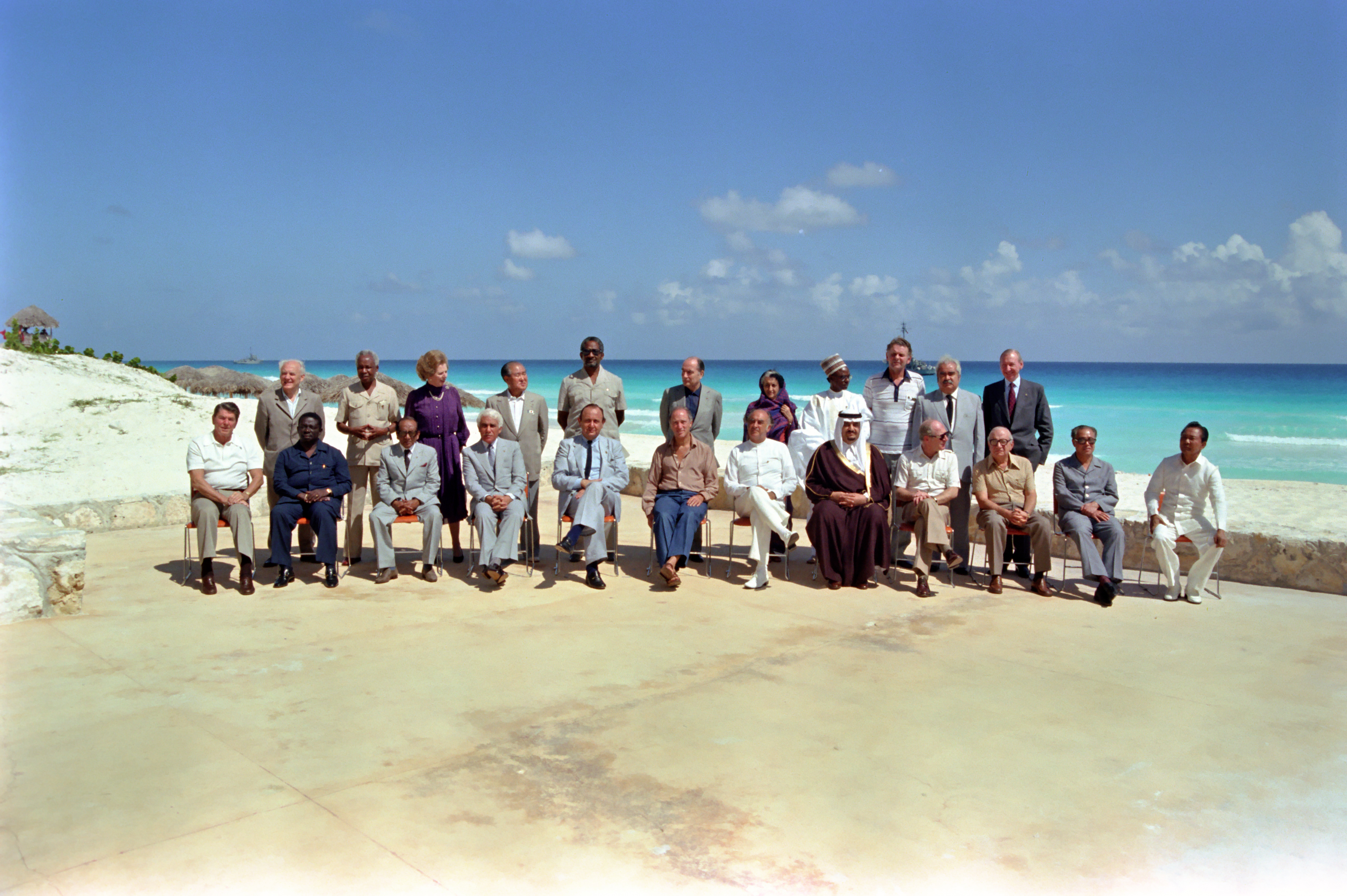
Heads of State and government at the North–South Summit in Cancun; 23 October 1981. From left to right, front row: Reagan (USA), Houphouët-Boigny (Côte-d'Ivoire), A. Sattar (Bangladesh), Chadli (Algeria), Genscher (FRG), Trudeau (Canada), Lopez Portillo (Mexico), Fahd (Saudi Arabia), Pahr (Austria), Saraiva (Brazil), Zhao (China), Marcos (Philippines). Back row: Kraigher (Yugoslavia), Nyerere (Tanzania), Thatcher (UK), Suzuki (Japan), Burnham (Guyana), Mitterrand (France), I. Gandhi (India), Shagari (Nigeria), Fälldin (Sweden), Herrera (Venezuela), Waldheim (UN)

The scenario of "Nuclear Alert" is filled with real-life events and characters from the 1980s. First among these is the rise of international terrorism; the fictional group IFARG was inspired by the real-life Provisional Irish Republican Army, Baader Meinhoff Gang, and Islamic Jihad Organization. President Reagan is also a regular character in "The Pilots from Hell" and "Fire From Heaven", making him the second American president featured in the Buck Danny novels, as John F. Kennedy had previously appeared in the 1962 novel Les Voleurs de Satellites ("Satellite Thieves"). Finally, the Cancun trade summit targeted by the terrorists was an actual event, the North–South Summit on International Cooperation and Development, taking place from October 21 to October 24, 1981.

The three "Nuclear Alert" novels were the first in "Buck Danny" not to have been drawn by Victor Hubinon because of the artist's death in 1979. Instead, Charlier chose younger artist Francis Bergèse, who was himself a longtime fan of "Buck Danny" as well as a former military pilot, to work with him. Bergèse has provided the drawing for every novel since, and was also left in charge of the story after Charlier's death.

== Characters ==
- Buck Danny: the lead character, now Commander, Air Group on U.S.S. John F. Kennedy.
- Sonny Tuckson: one of Danny's fellow pilots two best friends, who accompanies him on his private reconnaissance of the Caribbean.
- Jerry "Tumb" Tumbler: Danny's other best friend. He is wounded during the terrorist attack in Managua and spends most of the second novel in sickbay. However, he is back on his feet by the time of Cancun and personally prevents the success of Operation Apocalypse.
- Admiral Hal Walker: the admiral commanding the Kennedy battle group. Unwisely claims he will "eat his hat" if Danny's intuition about the terrorists attacking Cancun is correct; he is then forced to eat his words (and his uniform peaked cap) by the President at the end of "Fire From Heaven".
- Lady X: Danny, Tumbler and Tuckson's nemesis, who is hired by the IFARG to plan the aerial component of Operation Apocalypse. Unlike the terrorists, she has no interest in worldwide revolution and only accepts their offer to avenge herself on Danny after their several previous encounters.
- Von Grodtz: a German terrorist, who serves as chief of operations for the IFARG.
- Juan: a South American member of the IFARG. His family lives in the Yucatan and would have been destroyed by the nuclear attack. This, along with his concern for "the Indians, the poor" and the other innocents living in the region, leads him to betray his colleagues; thanks to him, Danny and Tuckson discover their actual target.
- Ghazi and Havanian: two Iranian F-14 pilots, formerly in the Shah's air force. Rescued from Ayatollah Khomeini's revolution by Lady X, they agree to fly the IFARG's Tomcats to settle their score with the United States, which they blame for abandoning them.
- General Sanchez: the chief of staff of the Managuan Air Force, who dreams of overthrowing his government and ruling in its place. Von Grodtz, posing as a Western businessman, offers to fund his coup in exchange for his help stealing the Tomcats.
- President Reagan: real-life 40th President of the United States. Charlier portrays him as a capable crisis-manager, willing to listen to subordinates and not afraid to take risks in his personal safety to bring the terrorists to justice (he is on the bridge of U.S.S. Kennedy throughout the IFARG Tomcats' attack).
- O'Connor: Admiral Walker's dog, whose love-hate relationship with Sonny Tuckson serves as comic relief throughout the story.

== Aircraft featured in this novel ==
- F-14 Tomcat
- A-7 Corsair
- E-3 AWACS
- Grumman Goose
- UH-1
- Beech Baron
