= Return of the Flying Tigers =

Return of the Flying Tigers is the ninth story arc in the Franco-Belgian comic book series Buck Danny, published by Jean-Michel Charlier and Victor Hubinon.

== Publication history ==
Like all of the Buck Danny stories, the "Return of the Flying Tigers" story arc was initially released in three separate albums; "Return of the Flying Tigers", "Flying Tigers to the Rescue", released in 1960, and "Flying Tigers versus Pirates", in 1961. During the 1990s, the series was re-released and they were recombined into a single album, named after the first novel.

== Plot ==
=== Return of the Flying Tigers ===
The U.S.S. Saratoga carrier battle group, of which Danny is the current CAG, is abruptly ordered to Manila harbour in the South China Sea. There, the admiral and Danny are informed that the CIA has been tracing an alarming increase in arms sales (including modern warplanes) to the region, which inexplicably are not meant for any of local governments. Washington fears that an aggression is imminent, and dispatched the Saratoga for this eventuality.

The carrier's planes are put on alert the same night in an attempt to intercept illicit flights in the region; while on duty, they identify, but then lose, a suspicious cargo plane flying towards Southeast Asia. The next day, Danny takes a Phantom jet and investigates some of the islands where the cargo might have landed; he is shot at above one of them and loses contact with the Saratoga. When Tumbler and Tuckson investigate, they discover an entire squadron of unidentified jets fleeing the area, with Danny nowhere in sight.

A search and rescue is immediately organized, but new orders from Washington interrupt it after only two days. The Saratoga has been ordered to proceed with all due haste to the Southeast Asian nation of Vien Tan, where a revolution has just begun, supported by the same jets and heavy armament that CIA has been tracing. Despite this, the admiral allows Tumb and Sonny one last search of the area; they finally locate Danny and bring him back on board, where the admiral informs him that his general's stars may be at the end of the upcoming adventure.

=== Flying Tigers to the Rescue ===
The novel opens with the admiral briefing his pilots on the situation. A criminal cartel has orchestrated a revolution against the U.S.-allied king of Vien Tan, to control the vital resources in his country's soil. Since the U.S. cannot intervene officially, they have agreed to lend thirty A-4 Skyhawks and pilots to the Vientanese, who will fight under the flag of the defunct Flying Tigers. (Unknown to the admiral, one of the thirty pilots, Dave Stimson, has a family in Vien Tan living in rebel-occupied country).

The new Flying Tigers land at their airbase and find themselves beset by problems. On the one hand, the rebels are well trained, well led and well informed, while on the other, the Americans are severely hindered by the incompetence of the Vientanese staff officers they serve under. To make matters worse, they eventually discover that the mercenary pilots they face are being led by an old enemy; Lady X, whom they thought to have killed a few years earlier. Danny sets the Tigers' primary goal as locating and destroying the enemy fighter base.

Meanwhile, Stimson, quietly helped by Sonny and a local peasant, Thi Ba, tries to send a message to his family in the north; instead, Thi Ba is captured by the rebels, who instantly understand the uses they can make of him. With the information he reveals to them, they locate Stimson's wife and force her to write a letter meant to draw her husband into a trap. Despite his wariness, Sonny Tuckson agrees to fly into the north with Stimson and try to save his family; instead, they are captured and imprisoned by the rebels.

=== Flying Tigers versus Pirates ===
After her partial success in the previous novel, Lady X now plans to finish the war by crushing the Flying Tigers in one blow. On the one hand, she has the rebel propaganda broadcasts announce the capture and upcoming execution of Tuckson and Stimson; on the other, using Thi Ba, she lets false information trickle to Danny in the hopes of drawing out the entire squadron and destroying it.

With tempers running high, many of the pilots call for an out and out frontal assault; but Danny, wary of another trap, organizes his own recon into enemy territory with the help of Vientanese royal soldiers. The latter manage to get in touch with the prisoners, and learn among other things of Thi Ba's treason, which they report to headquarters. With this new information, Danny puts together another rescue plan, this one in cooperation with the Vientanese soldiers rather than Thi Ba and his associates.

The operation goes off without a hitch until the very end; one of the two rescue helicopters is disabled on takeoff, and the remaining one is too small to accommodate everyone. Sonny Tuckson remains with Souva, the Vientanese commander, and they make their way back to base on foot. This proves harder than anticipated, and becomes doubly so for Sonny when Souva is killed by a landmine. After being lost in the jungle for a week, he miraculously stumbles upon Lady X's airbase, a heavily protected airstrip in the middle of a mountain range.

After nightfall, he steals one of the rebel jets and flies it back to the Flying Tiger base. Having finally located their enemies' base, the Tigers take off as soon as possible; approaching through a narrow and undefended canyon identified earlier on by Sonny, they catch the rebels unawares and destroy the entire airbase with napalm bombs. Without its aerial support, the rebellion collapses quickly; the novel concludes after the war's end with Sonny being decorated for bravery by the Vientanese king.

== Behind the scenes ==
This story arc was heavily influenced by media censorship in France, "Buck Danny"'s biggest market, which had already resulted in the banning of the two Korean War novels. The Indochina War and its repercussions, including U.S. involvement in the region, had also been banned from French popular literature; thus Charlier was forced to draft a strictly fictional story, with no basis in international reality. The imaginary nation of Vien Tan stands in for Vietnam; the war between the communists and the Diem regime was replaced by a palace quarrel between a king and his rebellious nephew; and the villains' backers, rather than the Soviet Union, were made to be an unnamed and therefore apolitical criminal organization (the same role fulfilled by SPECTRE in the Bond movies of the same era).

The Flying Tigers' part in the story, however, was another matter; it was largely inspired by General Claire Lee Chennault's very real activities after 1945. At the end of World War Two, the General purchased several surplus military aircraft to create the Civil Air Transport (later Air America), an officially private company which in fact worked for the CIA and with other Western and allied governments throughout the Chinese Civil War, Korean War, First Indochina War, and Vietnam War. According to Charlier, Chennault also planned to form a combat unit, the International Volunteer Group, which would have contained volunteers of any nationality and lent its services to any government threatened by the spread of communism. It was on these groups, as well as the historic Flying Tigers, that Buck's unofficial squadron was based. The story was also a nostalgic return to the comic book's beginnings, since Danny, Tumbler and Tuckson had originally met while serving in Chennault's command during the war.

== Characters ==
- Buck Danny: the series' lead character; Commander, Air Group on U.S.S. Saratoga, and briefly transferred to commander of the unofficial Flying Tigers unit in Vien Tan.
- Jerry "Tumb" Tumbler: Danny's second in command, who helps deal with both Danny and the pilots' frustration from the stress of their mission.
- Sonny Tuckson: Danny and Tumbler's best friend. In this novel, he distinguishes himself by his courage several times, especially his willingness to help Stimson save his family, and his actions in finding and attacking the enemy airbase.
- Slim Holden: an ace but a hotheaded and often impulsive pilot, whom the trio has worked with in several previous novels.
- Dave Stimson: a pilot on the Saratoga, whose father-in-law, wife and infant son live on a plantation in Vien Tan and have been MIA since the revolution began. He signs up with the Flying Tigers in the hopes of locating and helping them.
- Lady X: Danny's nemesis, whom he has already faced twice in previous novels. She is hired to assemble and lead a squadron of pilots to serve as the rebels' air force.
- Prince Prahabang: the nephew of the Vientanese king, Lady X's employer, and a puppet for a criminal organization seeking to control Vien Tan's resources.
- Nuoc Raheng: the King of Vien Tan. A longstanding U.S. ally, he appears at the end when decorating Sonny Tuckson for valor.
- Lin Phu Doc: a Vientanese general assigned as the Flying Tigers' direct superior. Incompetent and cowardly, his instructions nearly cause the destruction of the entire squadron in one engagement; Danny responds by giving him a black eye, after which he more or less fades from the story.
- Captain Souva: a brave and resourceful officer in the Royal Vientannese Army, he risks his life to save Sonny from a rebel jail, then to help him back to allied territory; he is killed during the latter part of the mission.
- Thi Ba: a Vientanese peasant originally hired by Stimson to help find his family. Prahabang and Lady X identify, then "turn" him and use him to supply the Americans with bad information until they discover his betrayal.

== Aircraft featured in this novel ==
- A-4 Skyhawk
- F-4 Phantom II
- F-8 Crusader
- F9F Panther
- Sikorsky H-34
- Fiat G.91
