= North–South Summit =

International summit in Cancún, Mexico, in 1981

North–South Summit International Meeting on Cooperation and Development
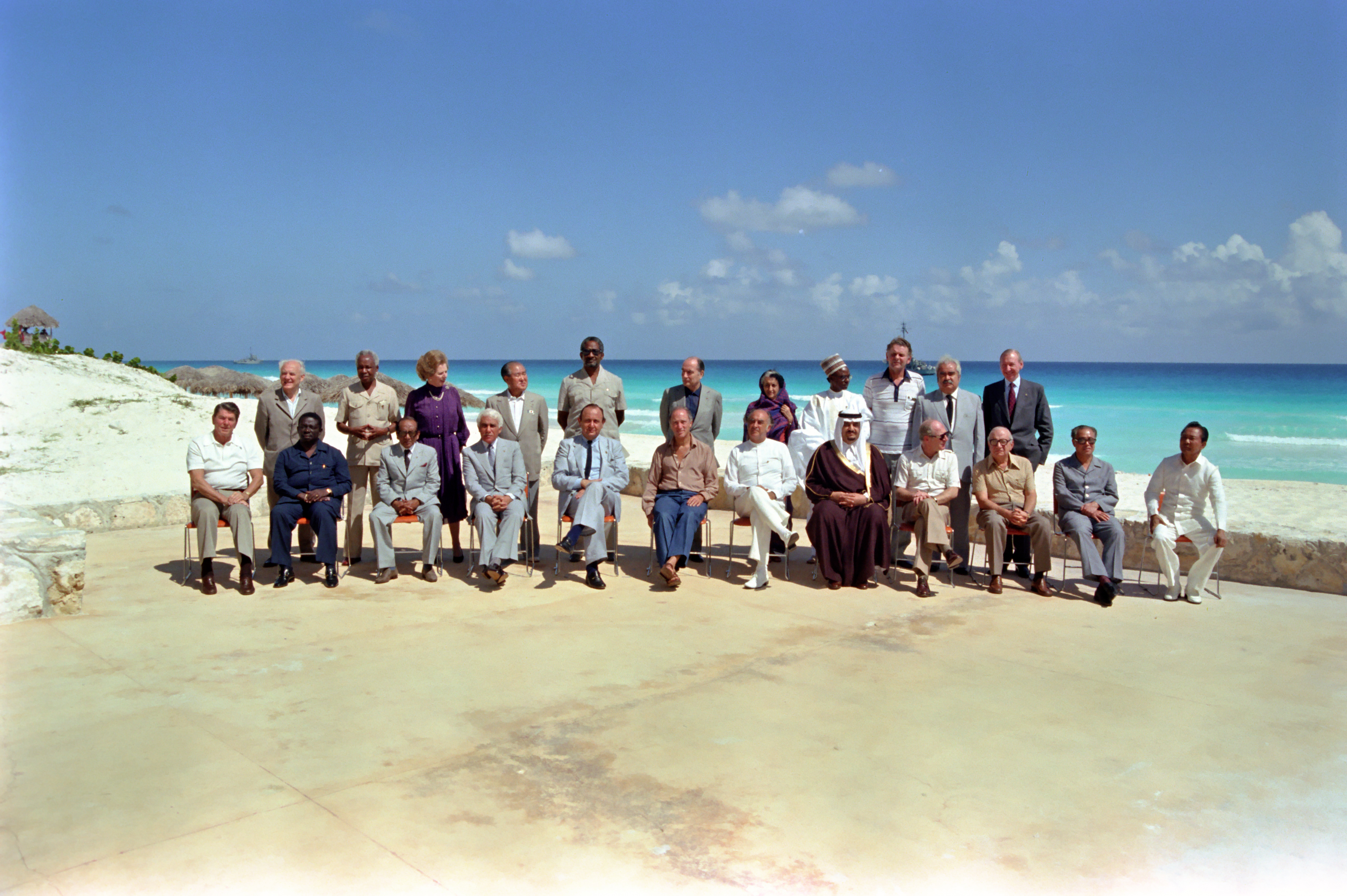
- Participants at the Cancun Sheraton Hotel Beach.
- Host country: Mexico
- Date: 22–23 October 1981
- Cities: Cancún
- Venues: Cancun Sheraton Hotel, Hotel Zone
- Participants: 22 countries
- Chair: (Mexico) José López Portillo

The North–South Summit, officially the International Meeting on Cooperation and Development, was an international summit held in Cancún, Mexico, from 22 to 23 October 1981. The summit was attended by representatives of 22 countries from five continents. It is the only north-south summit conference in history.

The goal of the conference was focused around economic development of the Global South and revitalizing economic relations with the North. Topics of discussion focused around agricultural development and food, energy, trade and industrialization, and finances. While no substantial agreements or commitments resulted from the conference, it is the only North-South summit conference in history outside of the United Nations organization and set the stage for further global communication between the global North and South.

== Context ==
=== North-South focus ===
The Summit occurred at a time when previously colonized countries were trying to establish themselves politically domestically and internationally. In the post-war era, unstable economic and political institutions, and the mismanagement of natural resources resulted in poverty and economic shortages. From 1960 to 1980 the United Nations held two consecutive "Development Decades", to create and support initiatives for the economic development of the Third World. Leading up to the North–South Summit, there were meetings, conferences and reports that directly and indirectly set a foundation for the conference in Cancún. Among them, the United Nations Conference of Trade and Development (UNCTAD) had put together conferences (UNCTAD I–III) throughout the 1970s which established the G77.

The invention of the Brandt Line through the Brandt Report (1980) formed the division of 'Global North' and 'Global South' countries based on economic development status. This report emphasized the need for a revitalized and efficient cooperation between North and South to reallocate finances and economic resources for quicker development of the South. In pursuit of the Report's emergency programme, Mexican president José López Portillo and Austrian chancellor Bruno Kreisky, began the organization of the North–South Summit to start discussions between countries from the North and South.

=== Economic ===
The International Monetary Fund (IMF) and the World Bank, two major international financial institutions, took on larger roles in the late 1970s and early 80s. After the 1970s energy crises, the IMF and World Bank started using structural adjustment programs and other forms of neoliberal economic policies to assist in the development, mostly in the global South. The programs included conditions for governments to enact policies and restructure their governments and economies. While the effects of these policies are contested, critics believed growth in GDP and capital investment remained limited in many countries. Leaders in the global South like López Portillo built political will and an intellectual movement towards a New International Economic Order (NIEO) in the early 1970s.

To make the NIEO into an international policy, some developing countries tried to implement a code of conduct for states in their economic relations through the United Nations. A Charter of Economic Rights and Responsibilities, which had been under discussion at UNCTAD since 1972, served as the vehicle for this. After inconclusive negotiations, the UN General Assembly cast a vote for the application of the new economic Charter. The majority of the developed nations voted against the Charter or abstained as they thought the new Charter was imbalanced.

Next, some developing nations tried to broaden international collaboration for development during the Second General Conference of the United Nations Industrial Development Organization (UNIDO), which was held in Lima in March 1975. The former economic strategy of export-led and agro-based business growth transitioned to recommendations for a multi-sectoral strategy. To lessen reliance on developed countries for technology, the conference also supported the advancement of science and technology in underdeveloped nations. The Lima conference also called for the redistribution of industrial capacity to boost the current proportion of emerging nations. Among the countries that refused segments of the Lima economic strategies, the United States voted against any economic reform, remaining committed to the existing economic international order and institutions.

=== Political ===
The G77 gained prominence in the United Nations General Assembly in the late 1960s and early 1970s, with many members forming part of the Non-Aligned Movement that did not openly side with the bi-polar political ideologies of the Cold War. Some countries involved in the Non-Aligned Movement helped create the NIEO. With economic development being a prominent international topic, Global North countries such as the United States, United Kingdom, West Germany, and Japan, agreed to attend the Summit in response to calls from other global North powers such as France, Canada, and Mexico, to discuss the growing wealth gap of North and South. The effect of the Cold War was still evident during the formation of the summit as the Soviet Union chose not to attend the Summit, and Cuba was excluded at the request of the United States. China and Yugoslavia were the only communist countries to attend the summit.

=== Location ===
Located geographically directly below the United States, Mexico had sustained diplomatic relations with the US, a global superpower, and had a history of domestic policies supporting lower socio-economic classes within the country. With President José López Portillo as a proponent of the NIEO and with the country's post-revolutionist climate, to gain prominence in the international sphere, Cancún became a politically strategic location for the summit. As a new resort city, the Mexican government wished to transform it to a global tourist destination and locating the Summit in Cancún provided necessary exposure and publicity.

=== Preliminary meetings ===
The Cancún Summit was organized by states' Ministers of Foreign Affairs. The first meeting was planned by the foreign ministers of Mexico and Austria at the UN General Assembly's XXXV Session in September 1980. Developed nations such as France, Canada, and Sweden, as well as emerging nations such as Algeria, India, Nigeria, and Yugoslavia, were invited by the foreign ministers to join a summit in Vienna in November 1980. Tanzania and West Germany later joined. The attendees discussed which nations to invite to any future summits during their initial meeting in Vienna. They agreed that a future summit would take place in Mexico, but did not specify when it would happen . The only similar type of meeting to Cancún was a smaller summit in Jamaica in December 1978, convened by Michael Manley, the prime minister of Jamaica, and West German Chancellor Helmut Schmidt with diplomats from Australia, Canada, Jamaica, Nigeria, Norway, the German Federal Republic, and Venezuela.

In March 1981, a follow-up meeting with the same participants was planned to take place in Vienna. It was decided in the final statement from the preparation sessions that the conference would be political in character, informal in its processes, and not engage into negotiations but instead provide an opportunity for nations to voice their opinions.

The decision to invite Bangladesh, Brazil, China, Guyana, Ivory Coast, Japan, the Philippines, Saudi Arabia, Great Britain, the United States, Venezuela, and the Soviet Union was made during the Vienna pre-meeting. President Reagan received a personal invitation to Cancún from President López Portillo in an effort to ensure U.S. participation.

Foreign ministers from the 22 nations invited to the summit met for the final time before the summit on 1–2 August 1981 in Cancún. Attendees discussed the summit's formal aspects; they did not discuss its content or a specific agenda .

== Participants ==
The summit was attended by 22 countries from five continents. As well as the UN delegation, there were eight leaders from industrialized nations and fourteen less economically developed nations. A delegation of no more than ten individuals accompanied the heads of state and government. The delegation often consisted of the minister of foreign affairs, diplomatic aides, and the head of state's translator. American participation was seen as an essential component to the meeting as the United States provided more funds than any other nation. As of 7 August 2025, Willibald Pahr is the last surviving participant.

| Country | Representative | Title |
|---|---|---|
| United Nations | Kurt Waldheim | Secretary-General |
| Algeria | Chadli Bendjedid | President |
| Austria | Willibald Pahr | Minister of Foreign Affairs |
| Bangladesh | Abdus Sattar | President |
| Brazil | Ramiro Saraiva Guerreiro | Minister of External Relations |
| Canada | Pierre Trudeau | Prime Minister |
| China | Zhao Ziyang | Premier |
| France | François Mitterrand | President |
| West Germany | Hans-Dietrich Genscher | Minister for Foreign Affairs |
| Guyana | Forbes Burnham | President |
| India | Indira Gandhi | Prime Minister |
| Ivory Coast | Simeon Aké | Minister of Foreign Affairs |
| Japan | Zenko Suzuki | Prime Minister |
| Mexico | José López Portillo | President |
| Nigeria | Shehu Shagari | President |
| Philippines | Ferdinand Marcos | President |
| Saudi Arabia | Fahd bin Abdulaziz Al Saud | Crown Prince |
| Sweden | Thorbjörn Fälldin | Prime Minister |
| Tanzania | Julius Nyerere | President |
| United Kingdom | Margaret Thatcher | Prime Minister |
| United States | Ronald Reagan | President |
| Venezuela | Luis Herrera Campins | President |
| SFR Yugoslavia | Sergej Kraigher | President of the Presidency of Yugoslavia |

=== Individual contributions ===
- Mexican President José López Portillo: Conference chair
- Federal Chancellor of Austria Bruno Kreisky: Original Co-chair, did not end up attending due to illness
- Canadian Prime Minister Pierre Trudeau: Alternative Co-chair
- French President François Mitterrand: attended the summit on one of his first official trips abroad. He spoke about the need to change the terms of trade between industrialized countries and developing countries, and affirmed the will of France to actively contribute to the development of the Third World.
- Chinese Premier Zhao Ziyang: called for the establishment of a new international economic order.

=== Goals ===
The goal of the summit was to engage in a discussion regarding the proposal of new cooperation between the North and South for the development of the South. The emphasis was on the newly established NIEO, which would aim to redistribute wealth and resources from developed to developing countries. The NIEO was based on the principle of common but differentiated responsibilities. This idea recognized that developed countries had a greater responsibility to address global problems such as poverty and environmental degradation as their historical exploitation of resources in the developing countries resulted in their lack of access to global markets and capital. The G77 concerns included poor trade terms, declining currency values, and debt deficits, which they would discuss at the Summit. This ideology, however, stood in contrast with the existing neoliberal framework of international financial institutions and neoliberal approaches from the Reagan and Thatcher administrations.

== Proceedings ==
=== Topics discussed ===
No official agenda was set for the meeting, however there were four main topics agreed upon beforehand. The topics were food security and development, trade and industrialization, monetary and financial matters, and energy . The higher income nations from the global North refused to entertain the NIEO, turning discussions to trade and supply concerns brought forth by the global North representatives. The United States and the United Kingdom in particular, mainly argued for maintaining current relations among the North and the South. The main negotiations were focused on implementing the third United Nations development decade development strategy and to solve international economic struggles. The United States and the United Kingdom were opposed to any attempt to move the decision-making authority for the UN financial agencies into the UN General Assembly, where they would all be subject to a one-country, one-vote system of control.

==== Food and agricultural production ====
The fight against hunger was discussed, with an Algerian proposal to eradicate hunger being approved. It was understood that the problem with food supply was distribution and concern for high levels of malnutrition, particularly in sub-Saharan Africa and South-east Asia, was raised. The Cancún Summit participants agreed that increasing poor nations' capacity to increase their own food production should take precedence over providing direct food aid. However, a number of poorer nations also urged for more direct action. The creation of sizeable emergency food reserves to make up for lack of harvests and increased attempts to create a global food system that encompasses both production and delivery.

==== Trade and industrialization ====
Countries in Africa that were economically affected by fluctuating raw material prices asserted the need for international agreements for its stabilization. The 1979–80 oil crisis caused a disparity in the account balance of payment between the Organization of Petroleum Exporting (OPEC) countries and non-oil developing countries estimated in the billions of dollars. However, no proposals were made for any new international agreements on raw material prices. Instead, the delayed implementation of the UNCTAD Integrated Program for Commodities, as well the delay in the drafting of new trade agreements were acknowledged in the Summits' co-presidents' summary. After the 1979 UN Conference on Science and Technology for Development in Vienna, there was an interest among global actors to implement technological advancements into their domestic development plans.

==== Energy ====
The construction of a World Bank affiliate that would aid developing nations in building their own energy sectors was discussed. Energy rise in the global South was 30% faster than increases to GDP. Lower income countries were unable or struggling to pay for the amount of oil needed for growth. European states, Canada, as well as most of the emerging nations were interested to bring forth this idea. Countries that were members of OPEC also responded positively for a proposal for an energy affiliate. The United States, however, was not in favour of a new international organization. Following the discussion, the conclusion from the co-presidents of the Summit mentioned that the energy crisis was a global issue, not just a North-South one. Despite the proposal from French President Mitterrand to establish an energy affiliate before the meeting, the agency was not created at Cancún.

==== Monetary and financial concerns ====
Developing nations expressed concerns over the specialized financial institutions and their structural adjustment policies, particularly concerning balance of payment issues. Global North countries expressed support for these institutions, and no changes were made to their functioning.

== Outcomes ==
Following the discussion on global poverty, one of the only concrete outcomes was the creation of a food plan to eradicate world hunger by the year 2000, which has remained a feature of UN Millennium Development Goals and Sustainable Development Goals. Participants developed strategies planned to direct food donations, support of agricultural production, financial and technological aid. These strategies included a focus on providing long-term support for nations struggling with famine and malnutrition, as well as ensuring the nations had short-term aid in the meantime.

Many attendees including Reagan, Thatcher, Zenko Suzuki, and others, spoke positively about the conference in the media, highlighting the progress the Summit made in global negotiations. The international press in countries including the United States, United Kingdom, Venezuela, Sweden, and other countries, was generally negative due to the lack of concrete results. It had been agreed upon prior to the conference that no common declaration needed to result from the Summit. The NIEO project mostly disappeared from Global South policy objectives after the conference.

=== Follow up ===
No other North–South Summit has taken place since. East-West tensions took precedence over North-South relations in the late 1980s therefore the issues concerning the development of the South brought up at Cancún did not resurface as much post-Summit. Based on the outcomes of the Summit, the Global North appeared more focused on wealth generation than addressing inequalities. Additionally, there were conflicting values around economic development paths from the Global South. Therefore, no political collective continued to advocate for the demands brought to the North–South Summit. This lack of global unity and North-South cooperation would contribute to a call for South to South cooperation for economic development.

== In popular culture ==
The conference is one of the elements of the 1984 French film The Vengeance of the Winged Serpent.

It is also the subject of story arc Nuclear Alert of the Franco-Belgian comic book series Buck Danny, published in 1983, 1984 and 1986.

== See also ==
- G20
- Global North and Global South
- North–South divide
- United Nations Conference on Trade and Development

== Bibliography ==
Basterra, Francisco G, and Jesús Ceberio. "El 'Espíritu De Cancún' Se Materializará En Tímidas Acciones Para Paliar El Hambre De Los Países Más Pobres." El País, 23 October 1981. https://elpais.com/diario/1981/10/24/internacional/372726003_850215.html.

Black, Stanley W. 1985. Learning from Adversity: Policy Responses to Two Oil Shocks. Vol. no. 160 (Dec. 1985);no. 160.;. Princeton, N.J: International Finance Section, Dept. of Economics, Princeton University.

Brunner, Karl. "Economic Development, Cancun and the Western Democracies." The World Economy 5, no. 1 (1982): 61–84. https://doi.org/10.1111/j.1467-9701.1982.tb00005.x.

Dickson, David. "Hopes from the North-South Summit." Nature 293, no. 5835 (1981): 691–92. https://doi.org/10.1038/293691a0.

Goldstein, Walter. "Redistributing the World's Wealth." Resources Policy 8, no. 1 (1982): 25–40. https://doi.org/10.1016/0301-4207(82)90005-8.

Gosovic, Branislav, and John Gerard Ruggie. "On the Creation of a New International Economic Order: Issue Linkage and the Seventh Special Session of the UN General Assembly." International Organization 30, no. 2 (1976): 309–45. JSTOR 2706262.

Migani, Guia. "The Road to Cancun: The Life and Death of a North–South Summit." International Summitry and Global Governance, 2014, 174–97. https://doi.org/10.4324/9781315850771

Riding, Alan. "Mexicans Go All out for Talks in Cancun." The New York Times. The New York Times, 18 October 1981. https://www.nytimes.com/1981/10/18/world/mexicans-go-all-out-for-talks-in-cancun.html.

Thornton, Christy. "A Mexican International Economic Order? Tracing the Hidden Roots of the Charter of Economic Rights and Duties of States." Humanity 9, no. 3 (2018): 389–421. https://doi.org/10.1353/hum.2018.0020.
