= Dan Cooper (comics) =

Comic book series

- Created by: Albert Weinberg

Publication information
- Publisher: Le Lombard, Fleurus, Novedi, Dargaud
- Formats: Original material for the series has been published as a strip in the comics anthology(s) Tintin magazine.
- Original language: French
- Genre: War
- Publication date: 25 November 1954 – 1992

Creative team
- Writer(s): Albert Weinberg, Jean-Michel Charlier
- Artist(s): Albert Weinberg

Dan Cooper (also known as Les Aventures de Dan Cooper) is a Franco-Belgian comics series about a fictional Canadian military flying ace and astronaut.

The title was conceived by Albert Weinberg in 1954 as Tintin magazine's answer to Buck Danny, which had become a great success for the rival Spirou magazine. It was the second of three prominent Franco-Belgian aviation-themed bandes dessinées, alongside Jean-Michel Charlier's Buck Danny (1948) and Tanguy et Laverdure (1959). Weinberg wrote and drew the strip for almost forty years, with the exception of three stories contributed by Charlier in the early 1960s.

As per Franco-Belgian comics tradition, each completed storyline would appear as a published album after first appearing as a serial in a weekly magazine.

== Synopsis ==
Dan Cooper is a test pilot in the Royal Canadian Air Force. Early story-lines featured futuristic science-fiction themes such as piloting a rocketship to the Martian moon Deimos; however later stories were more rooted in present-day themes.

== Speculative connection to D. B. Cooper ==
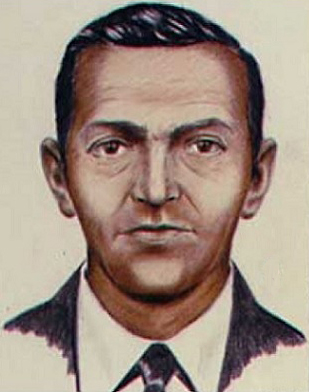
A 1972 FBI composite drawing of D. B. Cooper

Although fairly obscure in the English-speaking world since it did not appear in English translation (apart from a short run in the UK comics Champion and Lion in 1966 under the title Jet Jordan), the comics series nevertheless gained a small measure of notoriety in 2009 in the United States as a result of speculation concerning the identity of the 1971 airplane hijacker who came to be known as D. B. Cooper, but who had actually identified himself as "Dan Cooper." Cooper boarded a flight from Portland, Oregon to Seattle, Washington, claimed to have a bomb and demanded $200,000 in cash. He obtained the cash when the plane landed for refueling, and jumped from the Reno-bound airplane somewhere near Portland. Cooper was never apprehended or identified despite decades of FBI investigations, and the only evidence recovered outside the plane was a few thousand dollars in ransom cash buried or lost on a sandbar in the Columbia River.

The Cooper Research Team led by Tom Kaye, working in cooperation with Seattle-based FBI agent Larry Carr, speculated that the hijacker may have chosen an alias based on the fictional character. Kaye and colleagues suggest the hijacker may have become a fan of the comics while on a tour of duty in Europe, or that he may have been of French-Canadian origin since the Dan Cooper comics circulated in Quebec. Some of the comics storylines seemingly match aspects of the D. B. Cooper case, including jumping out of a plane with a parachute, as well as a ransom being delivered in a knapsack. The niece of one suspect, Lynn Doyle "L. D." Cooper (1931–1999), said in 2011 that her uncle had been a fan of Dan Cooper comics.

== Albums ==
No.	Series	Year	Title (original)	Title	Author	Publisher
1	main	1957	Le triangle bleu	The Blue Triangle	Albert Weinberg	Lombard/Dargaud
2	main	1958	Le maître du Soleil	The Master of the Sun	Albert Weinberg	Lombard/Dargaud
3	main	1959	Le mur du silence	The Wall of Silence	Albert Weinberg	Lombard/Dargaud
4	main	1960	Cap sur Mars	Set Course for Mars	Albert Weinberg	Lombard/Dargaud
5	main	1962	Duel dans le ciel	Duel in the Sky	Jean-Michel Charlier	Lombard/Dargaud
6	main	1963	Coup d'audace	A Bold Move	Jean-Michel Charlier	Lombard/Dargaud
7	main	1964	L'escadrille des Jaguars	The Jaguar Squadron	Jean-Michel Charlier	Lombard/Dargaud
8	main	1965	Le secret de Dan Cooper	The Secret of Dan Cooper	Albert Weinberg	Lombard/Dargaud
9	main	1966	3 cosmonautes	Three Cosmonauts	Albert Weinberg	Lombard/Dargaud
10	main	1967	Fantôme 3 ne répond plus !	No Response from Phantom 3!	Albert Weinberg	Lombard/Dargaud
11	main	1968	Acrobates du ciel	Acrobats of the Sky	Albert Weinberg	Lombard/Dargaud
12	main	1969	Tigres de mer	Sea Tigers	Albert Weinberg	Lombard/Dargaud
13	main	1969	Le mystère des soucoupes volantes	The Mystery of the Flying Saucers	Albert Weinberg	Lombard/Dargaud
14	main	1970	Panique à Cap Kennedy	Panic at Cape Kennedy	Albert Weinberg	Lombard/Dargaud
15	main	1970	Les hommes aux ailes d'or	The Men with the Golden Wings	Albert Weinberg	Lombard/Dargaud
16	main	1971	SOS dans l'espace	SOS in Space	Albert Weinberg	Lombard/Dargaud
17	main	1971	Ciel de Norvège	Skies of Norway	Albert Weinberg	Lombard/Dargaud
18	main	1972	Les pilotes perdus	The Lost Pilots	Albert Weinberg	Lombard/Dargaud
19	main	1973	Apollo appelle Soyouz	Apollo Calling Soyuz	Albert Weinberg	Lombard/Dargaud
20	main	1974	L'affaire Minos	The Minos Affair	Albert Weinberg	Lombard/Dargaud
21	main	1975	Objectif Jumbo	Objective Jumbo	Albert Weinberg	Lombard/Dargaud
22	main	1976	Crash dans le 135	Crash in the 135	Albert Weinberg	Lombard/Dargaud
23	main	1979	Opération Jupiter	Operation Jupiter	Albert Weinberg	Lombard/Dargaud
24	main	1979	Azimut zéro	Azimuth Zero	Albert Weinberg	Fleurus/EDI-3
25	main	1980	Le canon de l'espace	The Space Cannon	Albert Weinberg	Fleurus/EDI-3
26	main	1980	Opération Kosmos 990	Operation Kosmos 990	Albert Weinberg	Fleurus/EDI-3
27	main	1981	Programme F-18	The F-18 Program	Albert Weinberg	Hachette/Novedi
28	main	1981	F-111 en péril	F-111 in Peril	Albert Weinberg	Hachette/Novedi
29	main	1982	L'aviatrice sans nom	The Nameless Aviatrix	Albert Weinberg	Hachette/Novedi
30	main	1982	Pilotes sans uniforme	Pilots out of Uniform	Albert Weinberg	Hachette/Novedi
31	main	1983	Navette spatiale	The Space Shuttle	Albert Weinberg	Hachette/Novedi
32	main	1984	Viking connection	Viking connection	Albert Weinberg	Hachette/Novedi
33	main	1985	Target	Target	Albert Weinberg	Hachette/Novedi
34	main	1985	"Silver Fox"	"Silver Fox"	Albert Weinberg	Hachette/Novedi
35	main	1986	Dragon Lady	Dragon Lady	Albert Weinberg	Hachette/Novedi
36	main	1987	L'avion invisible	The Invisible Plane	Albert Weinberg	Hachette/Novedi
37	main	1989	La vrille	The Tailspin	Albert Weinberg	Dargaud
38	main	1990	Pilotes fantômes	The Ghost Pilots	Albert Weinberg	Dargaud
39	main	1990	L'otage du Clemenceau	The Hostage of the Clemenceau	Albert Weinberg	Dargaud
40	main	1991	Alerte sur le "Clem"	Alert on the "Clem"	Albert Weinberg	Dargaud
41	main	1992	L'œil du tigre	The Eye of the Tiger	Albert Weinberg	Dargaud
1	Special Edition	2004	Mystères et secrets	Mysteries and Secrets	Albert Weinberg	Loup
-	main	2004	Le maître du Soleil - Épilogue	The master of the Sun - Epilogue	Albert Weinberg	B.D. Club Genève
2	Special Edition	2005	Échec et Mat !	Check and Mate!	Albert Weinberg	Hibou
1	Missions	2006	Les paras	The Paratroopers	Albert Weinberg	Hibou
3	Special Edition	2006	Les intrus	The Intruders	Albert Weinberg	Hibou
4	Special Edition	2008	Tous azimuts!	All Azimuths!	Albert Weinberg	Hibou
5	Special Edition	2010	L'île aux géants	The Island of the Giants	Albert Weinberg	Hibou
