= Eddy Paape =

Belgian artist (1920–2012)

- Born: Edouard Paape; 3 July 1920 Grivegnée, Belgium
- Died: 12 May 2012 (aged 91) Brussels, Belgium
- Areas: artist, cartoonist
- Notable works: Valhardi; Marc Dacier; Luc Orient

Edouard Paape (3 July 1920 – 12 May 2012), commonly known as Eddy Paape, was a Belgian comics artist best known for illustrating the science fiction comic series Luc Orient.

== Biography ==
Eddy Paape was born in Grivegnée (now a part of Liège), Belgium in 1920. He started his career as an animator, working from 1942 on at CBA, the same animation studio where a few years later he would be joined by future Belgian cartoonists André Franquin, Peyo, and Morris). Paape soon left the studio to work as a cover artist and later a cartoonist for different magazines of publisher Dupuis. He began working with famed Belgian cartoonist Jijé, first on his ambitious New Testament comic project Emmanuel. He then succeeded Jijé as illustrator of the detective series Valhardi, published in the Franco-Belgian comics magazine Spirou. Paape illustrated the series from 1946 until 1954, working with famous European comics authors Jean-Michel Charlier and Yvan Delporte.

Paape became an artist for the World Press syndicate, continuing to illustrate comics, mainly for Spirou. World Press Syndicate was a Belgian syndicate, based on the model of American syndicates like King Features Syndicate, and its main authors were writer Charlier and artist Victor Hubinon. Paape assisted them on their series Buck Danny and the pirate biography Surcouf. For many years, the style of Paape would be a clear mixture of the influence of Jijé and Hubinon. In 1958 Paape created Marc Dacier, a series written by Charlier.

Paape's best-known collaboration began in 1966, when he created the Flash Gordon-like science fiction series Luc Orient with Greg. This series, published in Tintin magazine, became very popular and ran through 18 adventures.

In 1969 Paape began teaching draughtsmanship for comics at the Institut Saint-Luc art school in Brussels, where he remained until 1976.

== Selected bibliography ==
- Valhardi (Jean-Michel Charlier and Yvan Delporte, 1946), 4 albums, Dupuis
- Marc Dacier (Charlier, 1958): 13 albums, Dupuis
- Luc Orient (Greg, 1966): 18 albums, Le Lombard
- Jeux de Toah (Torah Game) (André-Paul Duchâteau, 1969)
- Tommy Banco (Greg, 1970): 2 albums, Le Lombard
- Yorik des Tempêtes (Yorik of the Storms) (Duchâteau, 1971): 1 album, Le Lombard
- Les Jardins de la Peur (The Gardens of Fear) (Jean Dufaux and Sohier, 1988): 1 album, Dargaud
- Carol Détective (Duchâteau, 1990): 2 albums, Le Lombard
- Johnny Congo (Greg, 1992): 2 albums, Lefrancq
- Les Misérables (after Victor Hugo, 1996): 1 album, Talent

== Sources ==
- Eddy Paape publications in Spirou, Pilote, Belgian Tintin and French Tintin BDoubliées (in French)
- Eddy Paape albums Bedetheque (in French)

Footnotes
