= Buck Danny =

Comic book series

- Main character Buck Danny with the logo of the series
- Created by: Jean-Michel Charlier and Victor Hubinon

Publication information
- Publisher: Dupuis
- Formats: Original material for the series has been published as a strip in the comics anthology(s) Spirou magazine.
- Original language: French
- Genre: Adventure
- Publication date: January 1947

Creative team
- Writer(s): Jean-Michel Charlier
- Artist(s): Victor Hubinon

Buck Danny is a Franco-Belgian comics series about a military flying ace and his two sidekicks serving (depending on the plots) in the United States Navy or the United States Air Force. The series is noted for its realism both in the drawings and the descriptions of air force procedures as part of the storyline. In particular the aircraft depicted are extremely accurate. Mixing historical references with fiction, Buck Danny is one of the most important 'classic' Franco-Belgian comic strips. Starting in 1947, the first albums were set against the backdrop of World War II, but from 1954 onwards, the series started to play in 'the present' and has so ever since. Like this, the series reads as a chronology of military aviation as well as the events that were catching people's imagination at the time of publishing, ranging from the Korean War, the Cold War, UFOs, international terrorism and drug running, the space race, rogue atomic bombs, the collapse of the Soviet bloc and recently the conflicts in Sarajevo and Afghanistan. The series takes place in a floating timeline with the conflicts and aircraft changing through the times, although the main characters largely remain the same through the decades.

True to the Franco-Belgian tradition the adventures are first published as a series in a weekly comic magazine. After a complete story has run its course, it is bundled and published as a book. In the case of Buck Danny, the story appeared in Spirou magazine in weekly installments of one page per issue and from 1947 to 2008, 52 albums have been published by Spirou's parent company Dupuis editions. All are still in print today.

From 1947 to 1979, the first 40 albums were a collaboration between writer Jean-Michel Charlier and artist Victor Hubinon. After the death of the latter in 1979, the series took a hiatus of 4 years before Charlier continued for 4 more albums with artist Francis Bergèse. After Charlier's death in 1989, Bergèse tried one album with a scenario by Jacques de Douhet before writing his own stories. After 1996, 7 more stories appeared, combining realistic penmanship with continuously complex scenarios.

Bergèse announced his retirement after the publication of album 52. Hence since 2008, production of new material ceased. Officially however, the series is not 'dead' but simply on hiatus while the production company is looking for a new artist and writer. In May 2010 it was announced that Dupuis commissioned writer Frédéric Zumbiehl and artist Fabrice Lamy to continue the Buck Danny franchise. With the publication of album no. 53 in November 2013 it turned out that writer Frédéric Zumbiehl was still in charge but drawings are now made by Francis Winis. If the new team proves to be successful, this would be the third artist and fourth scenarist for the series.

== Synopsis ==
The comic series follows the exploits of the American military aviator Buck Danny over a period of time from the Japanese attack on Pearl Harbor up to the current day. Although the first two adventures starred Danny alone, in the third album he met up with his sidekicks Jerry 'Tumb' Tumbler and Sonny Tuckson and from there on all subsequent adventures were done as a trio.

When the first stories started appearing in 1947, their themes—the Battle of the Coral Sea, the Battle of Midway and General Chennault's Flying Tigers—were recent history, but after 9 albums, the series caught up with current times and from then on the adventures always played in 'the present'. Since then, the series consists of a chronological string of adventures: In the 10th album, which is something like a watershed for the series, the trio become test pilots and at the end of the album re-enlist into the U.S. Air Force. The Air Force promptly sends them to the Korean War where the trio battles spies and unmanned aircraft. After that they are somehow transferred to the Navy and for the next 55 years they will serve on the latest supercarriers, fly the latest jets and helicopters and witness the latest progress in aviation firsthand. Flying a SBD Dauntless on his first mission, Buck Danny has flown Sabres in Korea, Grumman Panthers, Cougars, Tigers and F14 Tomcats for the Navy. In his latest albums, under stewardship of Francis Bergèse, Buck Danny and his team fly the F-18 for the navy, but simultaneously serve as test pilots for the Air force's F-22 program.

Besides flying for the Navy and helping out the Air Force, several adventures feature Buck and his friends as test pilots for NASA, for instance flying the X-15 rocket-plane or finding rogue transmitters interfering with rocket testing at Cape Kennedy. In addition the trio regularly changes into civilian clothes to work directly for the U.S. government, posing as charter pilots, flight instructors or mercenaries to investigate, uncover and finally thwart, criminal activities all over the world.

Realism has always been a trademark of Buck Danny, especially when it comes to depicting the aircraft and the procedures and jargon used by the air force. Often, despite the heroics of Danny, Tumbler or Tuckson, the aircraft and carriers drawn are the real heroes. Helping with this is the fact that, contrary to American comic books, Belgian magazines were letter-sized like regular news magazines (technically they were in A4 paper format). Consequently, the resulting albums are letter-sized hard- or softcovers as well, considerably larger than American comics or Japanese Manga. Also they are printed on top-quality paper rather than pulp. All this gives the artist more opportunity to add detail to his drawings.

Realism also is reflected in the grim atmosphere of the books. Especially the Cold War albums are slowly built-up mysteries where the heroes are constantly under the threat of attack by an unseen enemy. Sabotage, often with deadly results is a common feature in more than one album and several supporting characters are shot, ambushed, blown up by booby-traps or otherwise die violent deaths. Often Buck and his teammates escape more by luck than by their own cunning and the feeling that they could have died lingers deep through the following pages.

The realism of the stories playing in the present even goes so far that there are over the 53 stories no prequels nor flashback nor secrets from Buck's past as a plot device. Each new stories follows the other chronologically, although some time may have elapsed between one adventure and another. An exception to that are a couple of short stories drawn by Francis Bergèse included in the large collection books, but not distributed in the official list of albums.

As is traditional in the Franco-Belgian comic business, the size of a published comic album is limited to 40-45 pages. Adventures that run longer are either distributed as 40-page chapters of a saga or designed to form independent stories within a longer arc. In the case of Buck Danny, 53 albums form 31 distinct stories: 16 albums are stand-alone adventures, 11 stories are spread out over two albums, 4 stories even use 3 albums. However, especially after the 10th album, the albums of a multi-story arc are laid out as closed chapters with a distinctive ending point, often a cliffhanger at the end of the album and a short recap at the beginning of the next album.

== Publication history ==
=== The Pacific War: 1947–1948 ===
Shortly after the end of World War II, Brussels was for a few years the hotbed of the emerging comic industry. As such editor Georges Troisfontaines owned an agency called 'World Press' which he modeled after the American comic strip syndicates. Part of his staff were the artist Victor Hubinon and Jean-Michel Charlier, who quickly became a talented writer. Soon, Troisfontaines proposed that the two work together. They first collaborated on L'Agonie du Bismark (The Agony of the Bismark), a war account serialized in Spirou magazine in 1946.

Seeing the success of American pilot strips, Troisfontaines suggested to Hubinon and Charlier that they should produce a series about an American pilot just as well and even came up with the name Buck Danny. Keeping in line with their war account stories, the two came up with a semi-historical account of a young engineer working in Hawaii at the beginning of the war. Firsthand witnessing the Attack on Pearl Harbor, Buck Danny enlists in the Navy as a pilot and has a series of adventures serving on the aircraft carrier USS Yorktown against the backdrop of the Battle of the Coral Sea. The story was serialized in weekly installments in Spirou magazine from January 2, 1947, onwards. After the story ran its course, it was gathered and published in book form in 1948. By that time Hubinon and Charlier were already working on a second part, keeping the same formula but this time having Buck Danny live through his adventures against the Battle of Midway.

The storyline of these two albums consists of a string of smaller adventures of Buck Danny as a pilot and the real life events of the Battle of the Coral Sea and the Battle of Midway. In the fictionalized adventures, Buck Danny flies attack missions, engages in dogfights, gets shot down, escapes, returns to his carrier in a stolen Japanese plane and even rescues a hostage. At the end of each album, Buck Danny takes a back seat as his carrier readies for battle and in the description of the historical battle, individual historical pilots, commanders and raids are described in detail. As to the artwork, the pages are laid out classically in 4 'strips' of 3 to 4 panels each, although on occasion, two strips combine to a large shot. Panels often include inserts describing aircraft, carrier procedures, historical figures or maps of the area.

Two years is an incredibly short span to draw two 40-page albums and so, although officially the series was owned by Victor Hubinon and Jean-Michel Charlier, everyone at 'World Press' contributed to the albums in various degrees. As a consequence, the artwork is sometimes sketchy and the realism, especially in the aircraft depicted is certainly not up to par with later albums.

While working on the first Buck Danny albums, they also produced Tarawa Atoll Sanglant ('Tarawa, Bloody Atoll'), a historical account published in Belgium from the end of 1948 to the end of 1949 in the bi-weekly magazine Moustique. Like the Bismark account, this story retells the Battle of Tarawa in the Pacific Campaign. (The story was reprinted in Spirou in 1980 and subsequently republished in two 40-page books as a part of the Buck Danny series.)

=== Flying Tigers and desert pirates: 1950–1953 ===
The series took a next step in 1950 with the publication of La revanche des fils du ciel (Revenge of the Sons of the Sky) in which Buck Danny is sent to China to become a commander for the Flying Tigers. In China Buck meets up with his teammates Tumbler and Tuckson and by the end of the first Chinese adventure, the three become an inseparable team.

During 1951 and 1952, three more adventures follow in which Buck and his companions team up with Susan Holmes, an army nurse who'd previously had a small role in one of the adventures of the Midway album. During a Japanese attack on their city, the trio and Holmes are separated from their base and over the next albums they are chased all through Asia by the traitor Mo Choung Young on behalf of a semi-fictional Black Dragon Society (which owes more to American pulp fiction than to historical accuracy).

Again in 1952 and 1953, three more adventures followed. The war having ended, Danny, Tumbler and Tuckson reunite and go to fly for a dubious airline in the Near East. Quickly they are involved in a hornets' nest of gun-runners, opium smugglers and palace revolutions.

Although playing in completely different times and countries, the 'Black Dragon' and 'Desert Pirates' cycles are unique in that they no longer have a historic event as an anchor and instead focus on a series of adventures, often having nothing to do with flying at all. The adventures follow the yarn of a classic US adventure comic of that time and similarities with the adventures of Steve Canyon abound. This becomes obvious in the character of Susan Holmes who tagged along in the entire 'Asian' adventure just so she could be the stereotypical Damsel in distress, having to be rescued again and again. Although the 'Demobilized' story arc featured more flying, readers were still unsatisfied with the story and demanded more aircraft and less scheming villains.

The two story arcs were drawn at a very rapid pace, seven albums in barely four years, and the level of detail is far less than in the later albums. Especially the secondary characters sometimes appear sketchy and unfinished. Yet, inconsistencies in the storylines and drawings are kept to a minimum. Improbable plot twists do however occur more than once and it is clear that the series were not only drawn, but also written week by week with little thought to layout in books and chapters, but rather as a series of adventurous situations.

=== The Cold War by Hubinon and Charlier 1954–1979 ===
Still in 1953, Buck Danny returned to flying in his 10th album Pilotes d'essai (Test Pilots). Here the trio returns to the States and promptly re-enlists as test pilots for the air force. This album is buzzing with aircraft and flying feats and apparently here Charlier and Hubinon found their winning formula because at the end of the album the trio is placed back on active duty and promptly sent to fight the war in Korea. The Korean adventure only lasted two albums, both written in 1954, because the censorship imposed by French authorities forbade mention of the war in Korea, a problem that would also prevent any mention of the later war in Vietnam, but the next year Buck Danny was back again, this time transferred back to the Navy and serving as squadron commander on an aircraft carrier.

From there on the series would continue to play in 'the present' and Danny would continue to serve in the navy for the next 25 years and 26 albums. Keeping with the latest technology, Danny (and his friends Tumbler and Tuckson) would serve on the latest aircraft carriers and fly the latest Navy jet fighters and from here on aircraft carriers and navy jets would play an important part in the adventures.

Although the Korean War is explicitly used as a setting in the 1954 albums, Buck Danny would not participate in any more real war or conflict until Francis Bergèse took over the scenarios. Instead many of the adventures played either on the open sea or on U.S. soil. When the action takes Buck Danny and his team abroad, the adventures either play in an unnamed country, or in a fictitious state as the South Asian countries of 'Viet-Tan' and 'Malakka' or the Central American dictator state of 'Managuay'

Similarly, although playing in the midst of the Cold War after Korea, Buck Danny never directly engaged either the Soviet Union nor any of the Eastern Bloc states. Charlier rightly felt that his readers wanted their hero in far-away adventurous-sounding places, not their own backyard. Buck Danny never battled the Soviet Bloc military either: the adversaries of the Cold War Years were invariably criminal organizations, most of them employing or headed by Lady X. Even the occasional spy rings that appear do not steal military secrets out of duty or ideology; their aim is invariably to sell them to the highest bidder. When (usually fictional) foreign countries are involved, they are either headed by megalomaniacal small-time dictators, or by a puppet government installed to give credibility to the pirates or drug lords financing them.

The pace of the series was still furious (30 albums in 25 years) and could only be achieved by continuously turning out one page a week year round. On top of that, from 1959 to 1979, Hubinon and Charlier also made the pirate strip Barbe Rouge ('Redbeard') for the new Franco-Belgian comics magazine Pilote. The workload was enormous, especially for Hubinon, who did all the drawing. Still, the albums quickly came to display the high level of realism that would be a trademark of the series ever since. And somehow Hubinon still found time to write and draw stories on his own. Just before his death, he published one album of the pirate series La Mouette (The Seagull) which he both drew and scripted.

In terms of layout, one page still consisted of four strips of panels, but the ordering of the panels became more loose. Actually, the layout was that of two half-pages. In most cases, each half-page would display two strips of equal size, but variations in strip height were possible and wide-shots taking up the whole half-page were not unheard of. The occasional 'instructional' panel with aircraft stats disappeared, but maps or schematics still showed up from time to time.

Victor Hubinon died in 1979, shortly after finishing album 39 and for several years it looked as if with the death of the artist, after 32 years, the series had ended for good.

=== Charlier and Bergèse, 1982–1989 ===
On January 8, 1979, while working on his second book for 'La Mouette' Victor Hubinon died at his drawing table following a heart attack. Luckily, the last Buck Danny album was also the finishing album of a three-part story arc. Thus, there were no loose ends left and no half-finished stories to take care of. Jean-Michel Charlier instead devoted his time to finishing his and Hubinon's other big series, Redbeard, which he continued with Jijé as artist.

However Jijé himself died in 1980 and Charlier openly declared that he would end the series Redbeard as he knew no one with the skills of Jijé and Hubinon to do the series justice. This however only made him more determined to look for an artist to take over Buck Danny. He finally found an artist in the person of Francis Bergèse, who had previously drawn a string of aircraft-related strips with mixed success and openly admitted he started drawing comics because he grew up reading Buck Danny. Furthermore, Bergèse could imitate Hubinon's drawing style almost perfectly.

Cover of Mission Apocalypse 1983

So in 1982, after almost 4 years of inactivity, Buck Danny returned with an ambitious 3-album story: Mission Apocalypse, Les Pilotes de l'enfer and Le Feu du ciel, (Translated and published in English by Amusement Int (USA) in 1988 as Mission Apocalypse, The Pilots From Hell and Fire From Heaven). Drawing the albums took 4 years with the last album only appearing in 1986. However, this slower pace only enabled Bergèse to make his drawings more detailed and his work is au par with that of Hubinon in every aspect.

Bergèse and Charlier made one more album, Les Agresseurs (the Aggressors) in 1988 and started work on another two-album story afterwards. It looked like with his new artist, Buck Danny was back and up to speed again when on July 10, 1989, Charlier himself died. At that time, Bergèse had drawn the first 16 pages of what would have been Buck Danny's 45th album, Les Oiseaux noirs, (The Blackbirds). Although Charlier left behind scenario directions for all but the last pages of this book, it was decided that, with no clue on the second album and the conclusion of the story, work on Buck Danny would be stopped, this time for good. The 16-pages already drawn and Charlier's directions surviving directions for the next pages have since appeared in a number of specials, but are no part of the official Buck Danny canon.

As to graphics, the 4 1/2 albums of the Bergèse-Charlier team fit in seamlessly with the earlier albums drawn by Hubinon. As an artist, Bergèse copied Hubinon's style perfectly and the ships and planes drawn radiate the same level of technical realism. Bergèse even stayed true to the layout of the pages in four strips with the occasional half-page wide shot. The only difference is that with Hubinon the characters could sometimes come over as wooden or stiff whereas Bergese's persons seem more lifelike. Especially their clothes seem to fit them more loosely and display an occasional wrinkle.

In terms of plot, the albums follow the typical cold war Buck Danny layout of either a mysterious criminal organization threatening world peace (in the Mission Apocalypse albums a terrorist organization steals two nuclear bombs to wipe out a summit of world leaders), international espionage aimed at America's military secrets (in The Aggressors a Russian defector may not be what he seems to be) and cold war U.S. air power (in The Blackbirds Buck is assigned a covert mission on a U-2 spyplane).

There are changes however: Although the first scenes of Mission Apocalypse still play in the fictional Central-American state of Managuay, for the rest of the stories, cities and nations are openly called by name: The two stolen F14 fighters are flown by renegade pilots from Iran hired by Lady X, the summit the terrorists want to bomb is the real-life North–South Summit at Cancun, Mexico, and when marooned on a Caribbean islet, Buck and Sonny are rescued by a destroyer that is openly Cuban. (With Hubinon, the ship would be from a fictional Caribbean state). Furthermore, where in earlier albums, 'terrorists' were solely motivated by greed or revenge, the terrorists of the 'Apocalypse' story have a distinct left wing radical ideology reminiscent of the Baader Meinhoff or Red Brigade groups. Also, where former albums just make allusions to 'Washington'; or 'the President', here an accurately drawn President Reagan is addressed by name as he gives out orders firsthand.

The new realism continues in the next albums: In The Aggressors, for the first time in his career, Buck Danny openly enters a dogfight with a Russian fighter plane... and gets outmaneuvered. Later the pilot of that plane resurfaces as a defector and becomes Buck Danny's teammate while training for the Air Force's Aggressor Squadron. He turns out to be a double agent in a plot orchestrated no longer by a group of criminals but by the KGB itself. In The Blackbirds it is openly stated that the target of Buck Danny's spy mission is a nuclear facility near Vladivostok. All in all, with the 'new' Buck Danny scenarist Charlier now displays a level of directness that would have been unthinkable in previous albums.

=== After Charlier: Bergèse and De Douhet, 1996 ===
When Charlier died in 1989, the series lost not only its author, but also the last person of its original team and it seemed certain that with both Charlier and Hubinon, Buck Danny had died as well. Francis Bergèse was still around, but as good as he was an illustrator, he was no writer, especially not of the skill level expected for the Buck Danny series.

By now however, at the age of 48 Bergèse had found his calling in drawing aviation comics, so in 1990 he took on a comic book adaptation of "that other famous aviation ace" Biggles for Tintin magazine. At that time, the 'Biggles' adventure books by W. E. Johns were well known in Belgium and France, but as Johns had died in 1968, no new material meant no younger fans.

For Bergèse, the new strip meant a complete departure from his Buck Danny work. for starters, there was the artwork: The series playing during and shortly after World War II with a British flying ace as a hero, the aircraft of his choice now were Spitfires painted in colorful green and brown camouflage schemes compared to the dull navy blue and navy gray of the Buck Danny aircraft. Eventually, Bergèse played into this by painting the whole artwork in more vibrant, almost aquarel-like colors, giving the panels a look and feel reminiscent of early 1940s color photographs.

More importantly, as the series was based on a series of books written on average 45 years ago, there were no detailed instructions on panel-to-panel layout like the ones Charlier provided for the Buck Danny albums. Bergèse had to do most of the writing himself, starting with the selection of suitable adventures up to the page-by-page layout. As a result, with every album, Bergèse became more and more skilled as a scenarist himself.

By that time however Dupuis was yearning to remake the commercial success of Buck Danny, and so in 1995, through intermediary of Charlier's son Philippe, the documentary maker Jacques de Douhet was asked to supply some outlines for a possible Buck Danny scenario. One of the ideas caught on and so in 1995, Dupuis asked Bergèse back and he and de Douhet teamed up for Buck Danny album 45: Les Secrets de la Mer Noire (The Secrets of the Black Sea).

The album is at the same time a complete departure from the Charlier-Hubinon series as well as a logical development of their work: Playing in the new political realities of the 1990s, in particular the collapse of the Warsaw Pact and the fall of the Iron Curtain: Set in 1991, after Buck Danny 'loses' his aircraft carrier in a war game exercise, he is sent on a diplomatic mission to be an observer on the Soviet Union's latest aircraft carrier, the Admiral Kuznetsov and arrives there just in time to be a pawn in the attempted 1991 August Coup.

For the artwork, Bergèse immediately took over from where he had left off in 1989 and comparing the new album 45 with album 44, it is hard to tell the difference. There are however subtle details such as the air battle over Ukraine, which plays out against the backdrop of a deep blue night sky illuminated by a full moon. This poetic accent makes the battle appear almost dreamlike, something more fit for the Biggles albums than for Hubinon's hard technical edge. There is enough technical detail however in the realistic depiction of the various Soviet aircraft, helicopters and ships, especially the Kuznetsov and the A-90 Orlyonok ekranoplan which plays a key role in the later part of the adventure. Whereas the images are a delight, the story itself has its problems: Although it starts off with a bang and has several tong-in-cheek references to the 'classic' Buck Danny adventures (Buck's wingman on the Kuznetsov is a Volga German named Tumbler who later turns out to be a traitor), the story fizzles toward the end. Various secondary personages and side plots are introduced in the first part only to be forgotten later on and after Buck Danny is saved, the final conclusion of the big event, the August 1991 coup is only mentioned in one panel.

Nevertheless, the 'new' Buck Danny series had his potentials, and expectations were high for a second de Douhet/Bergèse album, a synopsis for which was already written. However, in 1996, de Douhet announced that he would retire from comic book writing for 'personal reasons' and once again Buck Danny was without an author.

De Douhet died on August 19, 2009.

=== Francis Bergèse, 1996–2008 ===
In 1996, the series was back where it was in 1989: A good formula, a superb artist, but no writer. However, whereas in 1989 Francis Bergèse clearly lacked the knowledge to produce a script that would live up to Charlier's standard, he since gained experience as a writer working on the Biggles albums.

Bergèse only made three Biggles comic books from 1990 until 1993, when he started working on Buck Danny again. All three were adaptations of the Biggles adventures written by W. E. Johns between 1932 and 1968, slavishly following the plot of the books. This even went so far that in the second album The Pirates of the South Pole Bergèse wrote a foreword where he apologized for having to draw polar bears in the Antarctic because the original book mentioned them. In 1994 however, while Bergèse was working on Buck Danny, Lombard gave the series to author Michel Oleffe and artist Eric Loutte. In a radical departure to the series Oleffe produced The Flight of the Wallenstein, an adventure written entirely by himself, without any reference to W. E. Johns, other than the names of the characters.

After Buck Danny no.45, Bergèse returned to Biggles for two more albums: Squadron Biggles was a collection of short stories reaped from different books of W. E. Johns, for The Last Zeppelin he wrote his own scenario keeping the original characters. So when de Douhet departed as a writer for Buck Danny, Bergèse felt that he was ready to take over the writing part as well as the drawing and in 1996 he returned to Dupuis to draw and write Buck Danny no.46.

As between 1989 and 1994, by 1996 the world had changed again and so Buck Danny's next album L'escadrille fantôme / Ghost Squadron plays against the backdrop of the Bosnian War, in particular the siege of Sarajevo. The theme was nothing but controversial: Frustrated by being forbidden to respond to obvious crimes committed by Serbian forces, the U.S. sets up a secret squadron of unmarked F 16 jets to combat Serbian warlords.... Only to find out that 'the other side' operates a similar squadron of Mig 29 jet fighters. In spite of this controversy, the album was well received and Bergèse followed up with a two-album adventure: Zone interdite and Tonnerre sur la cordillère (Restricted zone and Thunder over the Cordillera) in which Buck and his friends revisit the fictional country of Managuay. Although the story was less controversial: the fight against cocaine traffickers, it still showed the U.S maintaining an uneasy alliance with a local dictator and dared to give a little background on WHY so many farmers in Managuay chose to cultivate coca rather than food crops. In a plot twist Charlier would be proud of however the real culprit is an international ring of criminals run – again – by Lady X. Unlike Charlier, this time they are in cahoots with criminal elements on the Navy aircraft carrier USS Dwight D. Eisenhower who use their supply aircraft to fly the drugs from Managuay to the US.

In 'Ghost Squadron', Bergèse also introduced a new recurring character: the female Navy pilot: Cindy McPherson. Cindy resurfaced in the Managuay albums as a pilot in the same transport squadron of the traffickers and played an important part in unmasking the plot. She has cameos and minor roles in all of the following adventures and could be considered the fourth 'man' on the team in a way Susan Holmes was in the 'Black Dragon' adventures. However even as Cindy will occasionally get into trouble and have to be rescued by Buck, she is an accomplished pilot and definitely capable of taking care of herself.

After the Managuay adventure four more albums followed, each a closed adventure and each again situated against the backdrop of real-life events and so from 2000 to 2008 Buck and his friends have to rescue a downed pilot from South Korea, uncover sabotage and political power play in the F22 testing program, uncover illegal mining in the Antarctic and find a CIA agent investigating a ring of gun-runners in Afghanistan.

Apart from skirting today's hot-button topics and naming states and events by name, something that would be absolutely taboo in a scenario by Jean-Michel Charlier, there are several other differences between the two authors: Under Bergèse, both Buck Danny and Jerry Tumbler seem to mellow a bit and on several occasions Buck actually shows genuine caring, if not fatherly, feelings for Cindy McPherson. The most important change is however in the behavior of Sonny Tuckson who more than often reacts with outrage to perceived injustice. In this he has become the inner voice of Bergèse himself: When Sonny asks in 'Ghost Squadron' "Why isn't the world doing anything?" it is Bergèse's question to the reader just as much as it is Sonny's question to Buck.

7 albums between 1996 and 2008 make for a bit less than two years per album. About twice as long as Charlier and Hubinon took. This shows in the artwork: planes, ships and other technical details are as realistic as ever and the characters, especially Buck, do not only seem to be realistically drawn but also lifelike, compared to the sometimes wooden face and straight-as-a-rod postures drawn by Hubinon. In 2008, after writing his 12th Buck Danny album, (Porté disparu / Reported Missing) the 52nd in the series), Francis Bergèse, now 67 announced his retirement.

=== Winis & Zumbiehl 2013- ===
In May 2010 it was announced that the Buck Danny series will continue with an all new team of writer Frédéric Zumbiehl and artist Fabrice Lamy. Lamy is known up to now for drawing the realistic western comic strip Colt Walker while Zumbiehl bursted into the scene in 2007 with the one-shot album Team Rafale: a yarn about industrial espionage and economic warfare surrounding the Rafale fighter. In lay-out, Rafale closely follows the later Bergèse albums with their combination of flying, crime and politics and, a part of the flying taking part in a French plane for the French military, similarities between this album and Buck Danny abound.

As per December 2013 publisher Dupuis announced that album no. 53 was made available in Belgium and the Netherlands. It is written by Frederic Zumbiehl and artist is Francis Winis, who apparently has taken over from Lamy. Reasons for this are unknown.

== Realism ==
Except for smaller oversights – for example, the early WWII episodes use "Zero" as a generic term for all manners of Japanese fighter aircraft rather than the Mitsubishi A6M Zero – the series aims to depict aircraft very realistically, and often includes the most recent technological developments, such as VTOL (Vertical Take Off and Landing) aircraft, stealth aircraft, the newest Soviet/Russian aircraft, the effects of low-flying, etc.

The ships and bases where the adventures take place are also very close to reality (most are American, but a Russian and a French aircraft carrier have also been depicted, as well as real American bases). Certain events were also taken more or less directly from reality, when the censors allowed it; examples include the Korean War, the Bosnian War and the War in Afghanistan. More often, Charlier simply invented entire countries, thus allowing him to take greater liberties with the story. Since the Vietnam War, for example, had been declared off-limits by French censors, Charlier wrote the "Return of the Flying Tigers" story arc to take place in the fictional country of Vien-tan.

The realism of the series is also enhanced by short definitions or explanations of technical terms, such as radar or Radio direction finding. For this the authors often use separate texts, diagrams, drawings and schemes. Novels also often contain technical or historical notes, and at other times, English aviator jargon (such as "Scramble" or "Overshoot") is translated into French for the readers' benefit.

Although in the course of 60 years of stories Buck Danny is promoted from simple pilot to squadron leader, captain and colonel (Tumbler is promoted to major after Fire From Heaven while Tuckson seems to stay captain forever since his promotion in S.O.S. Flying Saucers!) the characters themselves never seem to age. From the first album on, Hubinon always drew Buck Danny with a realistic, weathered face and a military crew cut for his blond hair. Like this his visible age has always been somewhere between 25 and 49. Although Bergèse, as a scenarist makes 'his' Buck Danny appear more grizzled and war-weary, as an artist, he mostly kept to Buck Danny's original look, although in the latest albums the lines on his face appear a bit deeper. Likewise his companions Tumbler and Tuckson have kept their same look throughout the series. So Tumbler appears just as weathered ageless as Buck Danny, with Sonny Tuckson's round face and distinctive flock of red hair his not aging becomes apparent. This cannot be said of Lady X, Buck biggest antagonist in many albums, who although still as beautiful as vicious as ever also gets some more lines in her face.

== Handling of racial themes ==
In the series of three episodes following World War II that finds the heroes in the Middle East, one of the negative characters is Jewish, named "Bronstein", and depicted in a manner reminiscent of the anti-semitic strips of the World War II era. It is only in the 1950s that youth commissions, notably in France, insisted on the non-stereotyping of characters. By the 1960s, the series in fact alluded to racial tensions in the US as part of its story arcs, with Buck Danny taking a strong stance against discrimination and racism, such as in the album Les Anges bleus (The Blue Angels).

== Characters ==
From left to right: Tumbler, Tuckson and Danny as drawn on the back cover of the original publication albums.

=== Main characters ===
After Pearl Harbor Buck Danny enlists in the United States Navy, and soon finds his sidekicks Jerry 'Tumb' Tumbler and Sonny Tuckson, with the three quickly becoming inseparable friends. Together, they participate in many dangerous missions, their adventures taking them all over the world. In missions ranging from the Korean War in the 1950s to the Balkan War in 1996, they prove themselves as true defenders of the United States of America.

- Colonel Buck Danny: Buck Danny is the title character, and his rank advances fastest throughout the series (however, he never attains a rank higher than Colonel, as this would remove him from the status of active pilot). He represents the stereotypical fighter pilot (tall, blond haired, athletic, and rather handsome) and also the ideal leader; strict but fair, brave but level-headed, tough but easily approachable, an unquestioned patriot, and loyal to a fault. In the comics, Danny is described many times as "the best pilot in the Navy." Unofficial callsign "Targey".
- Captain Sonny Tuckson: a proud Texan, Sonny often serves as comic relief, a role which accentuates as the series goes on (in the form of pie-in-the-face pranks, failed sporting stunts, and prodigiously bad luck in romance). He is nevertheless an excellent pilot, and has proven himself to be extremely capable in combat situations. In recent books, he is known to decorate his planes by painting a skull and crossbones on the tail. He refers to himself as the 'Texan Pirate'. He is also the most loyal and risk-taking of the three, and is often willing to violate orders and ignore the chain of command to help a friend in danger. Unofficial callsign "Froggy".
- Major Jerry "Tumb" Tumbler: Tumbler is the least well developed of the characters, and also the most serious, cynical and suspicious of the three heroes. Chain smoking, he serves mainly as a foil for Buck Danny's character. The two were antagonists when they first met in China; Tumbler, a veteran in the Flying Tigers, resented the fact that Danny, who had just come in from the Navy, was promoted to squadron commander before him. This feeling faded away when Danny saved Tumb's life from the Japanese at great risk to his own; they, along with Sonny, have been best friends ever since. In later albums like Ghost Squadron his contribution becomes more elaborated. Unofficial callsign "Tumb".

=== Antagonists ===
- Lady X (Jane Hamilton): first showing up in Northern Menace, Lady X is the heroes' only recurring antagonist. She is a world-class pilot who was once "the fastest woman in the world," and is today a beautiful, mysterious and unscrupulous mercenary. She often works as a spy or secret agent, gathering information or running sabotage operations for the highest bidder (including foreign powers, the Mafia, drug cartels, nefarious business conglomerates and various terrorists and dictators). However, she has also at times been called upon for more hands-on tasks, as in the "Return of the Flying Tigers" story arc, where she is put in command of an Asian despot's air force. She has been reported dead many times during the series, but invariably resurfaces to the dismay of Danny, Tumbler and Tuckson. Originally a blonde, she is seen with brown/black hair in the later volumes, and is always shown as having eyes of "blue steel." Her motives for her behaviour are unclear, be it money, fame or even emotions. For sure, Lady X hates Buck's guts and would happily see him dismissed from the Navy as soon as possible. Nevertheless, some remarks by her and Buck in Buck Danny against Lady X and Mission Apocalypse point out she and Buck seem to know each other and share some common history of hatred and even love. This is also shown in No-Fly Zone where Lady X kisses Buck up-front upon which Sonny asks him: "How was it?" Buck answers: "Scary." Jean-Michel Charlier based her on famous German test pilot Hanna Reitsch.
- Mo Choung Young: a Chinese pilot in the Flying Tigers. He is secretly a traitor for the Japanese and a member of the Black Dragon Society, whose goal is to create a pan-Asian empire led by Japan and free of Western influence. His main objective in the story is to prevent Danny and Tuckson from bringing the Flying Tigers the plans for the Allied offensive in Burma. He and his Black Dragon superiors commit suicide at the end of Attack in Burma to avoid falling into Allied hands. Although he only appears in the "Flying Tigers" story arc, Mo is an iconic figure in the franchise.

=== Recurring characters ===
- Lieutenant Commander Slim Holden: a Navy fighter pilot and TOPGUN strike fighter tactics instructor who has a long history with the three main characters. Although as good a pilot as Danny, Tumbler or Tuckson, Holden's impulsiveness, fondness for the bottle, confrontational nature and lack of respect for authority have made it harder for him to progress through the ranks; this is occasionally a sore point between him and Danny. Despite their differences, they remain friends and Danny has more than once requested his presence on dangerous missions. Based on his personality, Slim is comparable to Tom Cruise's character Maverick from the movie Top Gun.
- Admiral Hal Walker: an admiral in the U.S. Navy, and the trio's direct superior since the "Mission Apocalypse" story arc, as captain of the carrier USS Eisenhower, where the core trio is often stationed on board. Sometimes impulsive and easily displeased, especially when Sonny Tuckson is involved. His most memorable attribute is his dog, O'Connor, who lives on board with him and quickly became Sonny's worst nightmare.
- O’Connor the dog (sometimes spelt O’Conner) is Admiral Walker's pet and a mascot for the carrier USS Eisenhower. He is very fond of Captain Tuckson, much to the Admiral's displeasure. O’Conner acts like a sort of ‘Marmaduke’ - he is cherished by his owner and lives to cause trouble for Tuckson. In Ghost Squadron he tags along with Sonny when he is transferred to a top secret land-based flying outfit. In Mystery in Antarctica, Buck and Tumbler play a cruel prank on him wherein they fake O’Conner's death by his hand; Sonny soon has nightmares of getting put to death by an enraged Admiral.
- Lieutenant Cindy McPherson: the first female U.S. Navy pilot portrayed in the series, she has appeared in several of the later novels (nineties and onwards). A crack pilot, she is also very attractive and a frequent target for Sonny Tuckson's advances. Callsign "Flare".
- General C. Scott: a general in the U.S. Air Force, often in charge of classified and extremely delicate operations. He first appears in Ghost Squadron, where he and Danny command an off-the-books fighter unit in the Bosnian War, and is referred to only as "General X." His name is revealed in The Night of the Serpent, in which he directs an operation to recover an American pilot in North Korea.

== Bibliography ==
=== As originally published ===
==== Jean-Michel Charlier and Victor Hubinon ====
No.	Original French title	English title	Story arc	Publication date (album)
1)	Les japs attaquent	The Japs Attack	Stand-alone adventure	1948
2)	Les mystères de Midway	The Mysteries of Midway	Stand-alone adventure, but follows 1	1948
3)	La revanche des fils du ciel	Revenge of the Sons of the Sky	Stand-alone adventure	1950
4)	Tigres volants	Flying Tigers	First of a three-part adventure, but follows events of 3	1951
5)	Dans les griffes du dragon noir	In the Claws of the Black Dragon	Second of three-part adventure	1951
6)	Attaque en Birmanie	Attack in Burma	Third of three-part adventure	1952
7)	Les trafiquants de la mer rouge	The Red Sea Smugglers	First of a two-part adventure	1952
8)	Les pirates du désert	Pirates of the Desert	Second of two-part adventure	1952
9)	Les gangsters du pétrole	The Oil Gangsters	Stand-alone adventure but follows events of 7 & 8	1953
10)	Pilotes d'essai	Test Pilots	Stand-alone adventure	1953
11)	Ciel de Corée	Skies of Korea	First of a two-part adventure	1954
12)	Avions sans pilotes	Unmanned Aircraft	Second of two-part adventure	1954
13)	Un avion n'est pas rentré	An Aircraft is Missing	Stand-alone adventure	1954
14)	Patrouille à l'aube	Dawn Patrol	Stand-alone adventure	1955
15)	NC-22654 ne répond plus	NC-22654 Is Not Responding	Stand-alone adventure	1957
16)	Menace au nord	Menace in the North	First of a two-part adventure	1957
17)	Buck Danny contre Lady X	Buck Danny Versus Lady X	Second of two-part adventure	1958
18)	Alerte en Malaisie	Alert in Malaysia	First of a two-part adventure	1958
19)	Le tigre de Malaisie	The Tiger of Malaysia	Second of two-part adventure	1959
20)	S.O.S. soucoupes volantes!	S.O.S. Flying Saucers!	First of a two-part adventure	1959
21)	Un prototype a disparu	A Prototype Has Vanished	Second of two-part adventure	1960
22)	Top secret	Top Secret	First of a two-part adventure	1960
23)	Mission vers la vallée perdue	Mission to the Lost Valley	Second of two-part adventure	1960
24)	Prototype FX-13	Prototype FX-13	Stand-alone adventure	1961
25)	Escadrille ZZ	ZZ Squadron	Stand-alone adventure, but follows 24	1961
26)	Le retour des tigres volants	The Return of the Flying Tigers	First of a three-part adventure	1962
27)	Les tigres volants à la rescousse!	Flying Tigers to the Rescue!	Second of three-part adventure	1962
28)	Tigres volants contre pirates	Flying Tigers Versus Pirates	Third of three-part adventure	1963
29)	Opération Mercury	Operation Mercury	First of two-part adventure	1964
30)	Les voleurs de satellites	The Satellite Thieves	Second of two-part adventure	1964
31)	X-15	X-15	Stand-alone adventure	1965
32)	Alerte à Cap Kennedy	Alert at Cape Kennedy	Stand-alone adventure	1965
33)	Le mystère des avions fantomes	The Mystery of the Ghost Planes	Stand-alone adventure	1966
34)	Alerte atomique	Atomic Alert	First of a two-part adventure	1967
35)	L'escadrille de la mort	The Squadron of Death	Second of two-part adventure	1968
36)	Les anges bleus	The Blue Angels	First of a two-part adventure	1970
37)	Le pilote au masque de cuir	The Pilot with the Leather Mask	Second of three-part adventure	1971
38)	La vallée de la mort verte	The Valley of Green Death	First of a three-part adventure	1973
39)	Requins en mer de chine	Sharks in the China Sea	Second of three-part adventure	1977
40)	"Ghost Queen"	"Ghost Queen"	Third of three-part adventure	1979

==== Jean-Michel Charlier and Francis Bergèse ====
No.	Original French title	English title	Story arc	Publication date (album)
41)	Mission Apocalypse	Mission Apocalypse	First part of a three-part adventure	05/1983
42)	Les pilotes de l'enfer	The Pilots From Hell	Second part of a three-part adventure	09/1984
43)	Le feu du ciel	Fire From Heaven	Third part of a three-part adventure	01/1986
44)	Les "Agresseurs"	The Aggressors	Stand-alone adventure	02/1988

===== 70th Anniversary edition =====
1/2	Les Oiseaux Noirs	The Blackbirds	First album of a two-part adventure	06/2017
2/2	Opération Checkmate	Operation Checkmate	Second album of a two-part adventure	10/2017

16 pages were written for Les Oiseaux Noirs before Charlier's death. The script was finished by Fréderic Zumbiehl and Patrice Buendia, and the artwork was finished by Bergèse. The second album was drawn by Andre Le Bras. The two were released as a 70th Anniversary edition in 2017.

==== Jacques De Douhet and Francis Bergèse ====
No.	Original French title	English title	Story arc	Publication date (album)
45)	Les secrets de la Mer Noire	Secrets of the Black Sea	Stand-alone adventure	03/1994

==== Francis Bergèse ====
No.	Original French title	English title	Story arc	Publication date (album)
46)	L'escadrille fantôme	Ghost Squadron	Stand-alone adventure	05/1996
47)	Zone interdite	No-Fly Zone	First album of a two-part adventure, but follows events of 46	04/1998
48)	Tonnerre sur la cordillère	Thunder over the Cordillera	Second album of a two-part adventure	04/1999
49)	La nuit du serpent	Night of the Serpent	Stand-alone adventure	10/2000
50)	Sabotage au Texas	Sabotage in Texas	Stand-alone adventure	12/2002
51)	Mystère en Antarctique	Mystery in Antarctica	Stand-alone adventure	06/2005
52)	Porté disparu	Missing In Action	Stand-alone adventure	03/2008

==== Frédéric Zumbiehl and Francis Winis ====
No.	Original French title	English title	Story arc	Publication date (album)
53)	Cobra Noir	Black Cobra	Stand-alone adventure	11/2013

==== Frédéric Zumbiehl and Gil Formosa ====
No.	Original French title	English title	Story arc	Publication date (album)
54)	La Nuit du Spectre	Flight of the Spectre	First album of two-part adventure	10/2015
55)	Defcon One	Defcon One	Second album of two-part adventure	06/2016
56)	Vostok ne répond plus	Vostok Isn't Answering	First album of three-part adventure	11/2018
57)	Operation Vektor	Operation Vektor	Second album of three-part adventure	10/2019
58)	Le Pacte!	The Pact!	Third album of three-part adventure	2020
59)	Programme Skyborg	The Skyborg program		2022
60)	Air Force One	Air Force One		2023

=== Spin-off series ===
In 2013, Dupuis created a spin-off series, ‘Buck Danny Classic’, drawn in the original style, and focussing on the period covered in the first books, with the Korean War for the first two volumes, the end of the Second World War for the next two volumes, then the Cold War for the last two. As of September 2020, the series has 6 albums.

==== Frédéric Zumbiehl and Jean-Michel Arroyo ====
No.	Original French title	English title	Story arc	Publication date (album)
1)	Sabre sur la Corée	Sabre in Korea	First album of two-part adventure	02/2014
2)	Duel sur Mig Alley	Duel in Mig Alley	Second album of two-part adventure	11/2014

==== Frédéric Marniquet, Frédéric Zumbiehl, and Jean-Michel Arroyo ====
No.	Original French title	English title	Story arc	Publication date (album)
3)	Les Fantômes du soleil levant	The Ghosts of the Rising Sun	First album of two-part adventure	04/2016
4)	L'île du diable	Devil’s Island	Second album of two-part adventure	06/2017
5)	Opération rideau de fer	Operation Iron Curtain	First album of two-part adventure	06/2018
6)	Alerte rouge	Red Alert	Second album of two-part adventure	06/2019
7)	Sea Dart	Sea Dart	First album of two-part adventure	2020
8)	Le Repaire de l'Aigle	The Eagle's Lair	Second album of two-part adventure	2021
9)	Le vol du Rapier	Flight of the Rapier	First album of two-part adventure	2022
10)	Molotok-41 ne répond plus	Molotok-41 doesn't answer	Second album of two-part adventure	2023

=== New edition albums ===
Beginning in 1983, in the line of the New "Buck Danny" novels by Charlier and Bergèse, Publisher Dupuis took it upon them to re-issue the previous albums in a collectors edition under the new format "Tout Buck Danny" ('Everything Buck Danny' or 'The complete Buck Danny'). These differed from the original albums still in print as each volume being a solid hardcover book with three or four of the original novels plus some additional material. With most of the Buck Danny stories stretching out over two or even three albums, this enabled the reader to have a complete adventure in one novel. Yet the addition of magazine artwork, promotional material and other work made it clear that this editions were aimed at the elder collector. During the hiatus years after the death of Charlier, this series continued with the accumulated material and its success no doubt prompted Dupuis to press Bergèse into continuing the series. At present, with 'complete' album 16 covering the 'loose' albums 49, 50 and 51, the 'complete' books have caught up with the loose album series.

- La Guerre du Pacifique, première partie (War in the Pacific, Part 1).

Covers the albums 1) 2) and 3) and Charlier and Hubinon's first collaboration: The Agony of the Bismark

After the Japanese attack on Pearl Harbor, Buck Danny enters the Navy and becomes an aviator. He participates in several naval engagements, rises to the rank of Commander, and is eventually transferred to the Flying Tigers, where he encounters Jerry Tumbler and Sonny Tuckson.

- La Guerre du Pacifique, seconde partie (War in the Pacific, Part 2).

Covers the albums 4) 5) and 6)

Danny and Tuckson are ordered to fly to the Allied headquarters in Rangoon and bring back the plans for the upcoming offensive into Burma. When the mission goes wrong, they are trapped in the middle of the jungle and must dodge Japanese troops, hostile natives, Chinese pirates and various traitors to bring the plans back to the Flying Tigers.

- Les Aviateurs Démobilisés (Pilots Demobilized).

Covers the albums 7) 8) and 9)

Unemployed after the end of the war, Danny, Tumbler and Tuckson are hired by a shady airline company operating in the Middle-East, and find themselves swept up in a nest of intrigue involving Arab tribal politics, smuggle and the rush for oil. The story arc was published during the early fifties as three separate comic books. The first two, The Red Sea Traffickers (Les Traficants de la Mer Rouge) and Desert Pirates (Les Pirates du Désert), were published in 1951 and the closing novel, The Oil Gangsters (Les Gangsters du Pétrole), in 1952. They were combined into the "Pilots Demobilized" album when the series was republished during the nineties.

The plot of "Pilots Demobilized" was inspired by the discovery and development of Persian Gulf oil in the aftermath of World War II, and the cutthroat competition that resulted between British and American companies on the one hand, and their surrogates among the local clans and dynasties on the other, sometimes leading to real bloodshed. Charlier and Hubinon were especially inspired by the conflict in Abu Dhabi between the ruling Sheikh Shakbut, who favored British interests, and his brother Zayed, who was supported by the Saudi-American Aramco.

To date, the "Pilots Demobilized" trilogy remains the only one in which Buck, Tumb and Sonny are civilians and not employed by the U.S. military. This provoked a negative reaction from many fans, who had enjoyed the six preceding novels and found the characters much more dull in the world of international trafficking and economic espionage than they had been as war heroes. The authors took this lesson to heart; in the next novel, the trio were re-hired by the U.S. Air Force (and, three novels later, the Navy), and never left their uniform again.

- La Guerre de Corée (The Korean War).

Covers the albums 10) 11) and 12) plus three short stories written for the magazine Sprint

Danny, Tumbler and Tuckson are persuaded by their old CO to return to the military as test pilots, and are eventually transferred to a fighter unit in Korea. There, they encounter not only Communist pilots but also drones against which Danny is ordered to find a response.

- Pilotes de Porte-avions (Aircraft carrier pilots).

Covers the albums 13) 14) and 15)

Danny, Tumbler and Tuckson are transferred to the U.S. Navy, where their adventures continue in three stand-alone novels. In the first, they train a squadron of new recruits to work as a team. In the second, they are racing against a group of ex-Nazis to uncover a treasure from a sunken U-boat. In the third, they take down a group of pirates disrupting air traffic over the Arctic.

- De l'Extrême-Nord a l'Extrême-Orient (From the Far North to the Far East).

Covers the albums 16) 17) 18) and 19) plus three parodies by Hubinon

Two story arcs. In the first, Danny and his wingmen provide defensive patrols over the military's newest ICBM test base in Alaska, and find themselves facing the spies of the mysterious Lady X. In the second, they return to the Navy, this time on a mission against pirates in the South China Seas, who are using weapons and bases abandoned by the Japanese to become a near-military force.

- Vols Vers l'Inconnu (Flights into the Unknown).

Covers the albums 20) 21) 22) and 23) plus a previously unpublished short story

Two story arcs. In the first, Danny and his wingmen are testing new prototypes with VTOL technology for the Navy. In the second, they are sent to Tibet to retrieve a German rocket scientist vital to the U.S. space program before the Soviets do.

- Pilotes de Prototypes (Prototype pilots).

Covers the albums 24) 25) and 31) plus a previously unpublished short story

Danny and his wingmen test two new aircraft for the Navy, first the brand-new X-13 (based on the A-5 Vigilante), then the X-15. They must overcome rivalries within their own squadron, and root out several saboteurs hired by foreign powers and disgruntled aircraft constructors.

- Le Retour des Tigres Volants (Return of the Flying Tigers).

Covers the albums 26) 27) and 28) plus a short parody

When a revolution begins in the Southeast Asian nation of Vien-tan, the U.S. finds itself unable to intervene officially. Instead, Danny and thirty Navy pilots are retired from the service and sent to fight in Vien-tan, under the flag of the newly reconstituted Flying Tigers.

- Missions Top-Secret (Top secret missions).

Covers the albums 29) 30) 32) and 33)

One story arc and two stand-alone novels. In the story arc, Danny and his wingmen try to recover a Mercury space capsule lost at sea. In the first novel, he must defuse the threats of a Caribbean dictator bent on causing a nuclear war between East and West. In the second, he and his wingmen investigate the sightings of unidentified aircraft over the Arctic.

- Missions a Très Haut Risque (High-risk missions).

Covers the albums 34) 35) 36) and 37) plus a previously unpublished short story

Two story arcs. In the first, the Navy loses a nuclear weapon over the Central American republic of Managuay; Danny, Tumbler and Tuckson are infiltrated among the rebels who recovered it to try to steal it back. In the second, they enter the Blue Angels stunt team and are sent to a high-profile airshow in Karachi, where they must again face the threat of Lady X as well as deal with racial tensions within the squadron itself.

- Mission Aérienne Anti-Mafia (Aerial Anti-Mafia Mission).

Covers the albums 38) 39) and 40) plus four short stories

Danny and his wingmen discover a Mafia-run opium plantation in the Bornean nation of North Sarawak. With the United States politically unable to act, the admiral in charge of the carrier group defies the Pentagon's orders and decides to take down the operation himself.

- Alerte Nucléaire (Nuclear Alert).

Covers the albums 41) 42) and 43)

NATO is being blackmailed by the International Front of Armed Revolutionary Groups, a red terrorist organization which has stolen a nuclear weapon and two F-14s from the U.S. military. Danny, Tumbler and Tuckson must locate the terrorists' base in the Caribbean before the Front can use the weapon on an upcoming UN summit.

- Ennemis Intérieurs (Enemies within).

Covers the albums 44) and 45) plus the unfinished version of the Blackbirds

Two stand-alone novels, heavily influenced by international developments in the last few years of the Cold War. In the first, Danny is sent to Nellis to take charge of a defecting MiG-29 pilot. In the second, he is sent to visit the Soviet Union's newest aircraft carrier and finds himself swept up in a web of perestroika politics; some parties want him eliminated, while others want to use him for their own ends.

- Zones de Combat (Combat zones).

Covers the albums 46) 47) and 48) plus a special short story 'The Mascotte'

One stand-alone novel and one story arc. In the former, Danny commands an off-the-books fighter unit in Yugoslavia. In the latter, they are sent to train fighter pilots in Central America making a transition from F-104 to F-18. There they find themselves facing a powerful drug cartel which plans to take control of several Central American nations... with a little help from Lady X.

- Embrouilles en Temps de Paix (Troubles in peacetime).

Covers the albums 49) 50) and 51) and two unpublished short stories

Three stand-alone novels. In the first, Danny and his wingmen help recover an American pilot shot down over North Korea. In the second, they are sent to test the new F-22's performance, which has recently been hindered by several sabotage actions. In the third, they locate a flight of unidentified aircraft over the Antarctic, and are sent to investigate.

=== Tanguy et Laverdure crossovers ===
Buck Danny crosses over several times with Tanguy et Laverdure.

Buck is first shown on his own in the adventure Escadrille des Cigognes, talking with two Australian pilots in the canteen of a USAF base in Europe. Buck and his sidekicks also appear in some of the illustrations for the adventure Canon Bleu Ne Rèpond Plus. In this story the two French pilots meet Buck Danny and his US Navy squadron of F-8 Crusaders in the US base of Thule. Another tribute is also present at the end of the Tanguy Et Laverdure story Prisonniers Des Serbes where Erneste Laverdure is reading the Buck Danny album Les Agresseurs.

Buck, Tumbler and especially Tuckson play an important role in the album Rencontre De Trois Type. This adventure is placed at Nellis AFB during one of the periodical "Red Flag" exercises on which the Rafale and Mirage 2000 of French Air Force are involved. Buck Danny and his friends help the French aviators to bring a dangerous group of saboteurs to justice who are carrying out attacks against French Rafale fighters, helped by an accomplice journalist, to disqualify the aircraft in the aviation newspapers. In this adventure Lady X also appears, involved in the plot against the French aircraft.

Buck, Tuckson and Tumbler are also shown in the second volume of the series Angel Wings. They are depicted watching Jinx Falkenburg during her concert which many squadrons were invited to. The Angel Wings adventure is placed during WWII, in the Burma area, thus in the same period during which Buck Danny and friends are on duty with the Flying Tigers.

Conversely, there is also a cross-over with Tanguy and Laverdure appearing in one of Buck Danny's episodes: in the duet of albums (36 & 37) where Buck, Tumb and Sonny join the Blue Angels and participate in an international exhibition; they compete against (amongst others) both Tanguy and Laverdure representing France, and Dan Cooper representing Canada.

In 2016 a special box set was published by Dupuis, Dargaud, and Zephyr, dedicated to Buck Danny and Tanguy et Laverdure. The box included the 'Buck Danny Classic' adventure Les Fantomes Du Soleil Levant, the 'Tanguy et Laverdure Classic' adventure Menace Sur Mirage F1 and a short black and white crossover (La Rencontre) between the two series placed in 1965, written and drawn by Zumbiehl, Buendia and Philippe.

=== English publications ===
In 1970/71, the strip was briefly reprinted in TV 21.

Several albums have been translated into English, including Mission Apocalypse in 1988, and Mystery In The Antarctic (Mystère en Antarctique) in 2005.

Cinebook Ltd have been publishing English language translations of Buck Danny since 2009.

1. Night of the Serpent, 2009, ISBN 978-1-905460-85-4
2. The Secrets of the Black Sea, 2010, ISBN 978-1-84918-018-4
3. Ghost Squadron, 2012, ISBN 978-1-84918-137-2
4. No-Fly Zone, 2014, ISBN 978-1-84918-207-2
5. Thunder over the Cordilleras, 2015, ISBN 978-1-84918-237-9
6. Mystery in Antarctica, 2016, ISBN 978-1-84918-287-4
7. Missing in Action, 2017, ISBN 978-1-84918-343-7
8. Black Cobra, 2018, ISBN 978-1-84918-389-5
9. Flight of the Spectre, 2019, ISBN 978-1-84918-436-6
10. DEFCON One, 2019, ISBN 978-1-84918-456-4
11. Vostok Isn't Answering, 2020, ISBN 978-1-84918-499-1
12. Operation Vektor, 2021, ISBN 978-1-80044-006-7
13. The Pact, 2021, ISBN 978-1-80044-036-4

== See also ==
- Tanguy et Laverdure
- Dan Cooper (comics)
