= Ramiro Saraiva Guerreiro =

Brazilian politician and diplomat

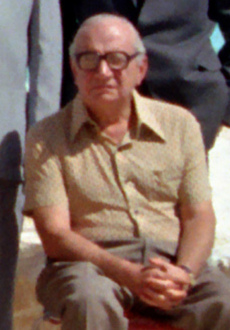
Image of Ramiro Saraiva Guerreiro

Ramiro Elísio Saraiva Guerreiro (December 2, 1918, in Salvador, Bahia – January 19, 2011) was a Brazilian politician and diplomat. Guerreiro served as minister of external relations from March 15, 1979, to March 15, 1985, under Brazilian president João Figueiredo. Before this, Guerreiro was general secretary of foreign relations in the government of military leader, President Ernesto Geisel, from 1974 until 1978.

Additionally, Saraiva Guerreiro served as Brazil's ambassador to France from 1978 to 1979, and ambassador to Italy from April 1985 until January 1987.

Ramiro Saraiva Guerreiro died of undisclosed causes in Rio de Janeiro on January 19, 2011, at the age of 92.
