= Willibald Pahr =

Austrian politician and diplomat

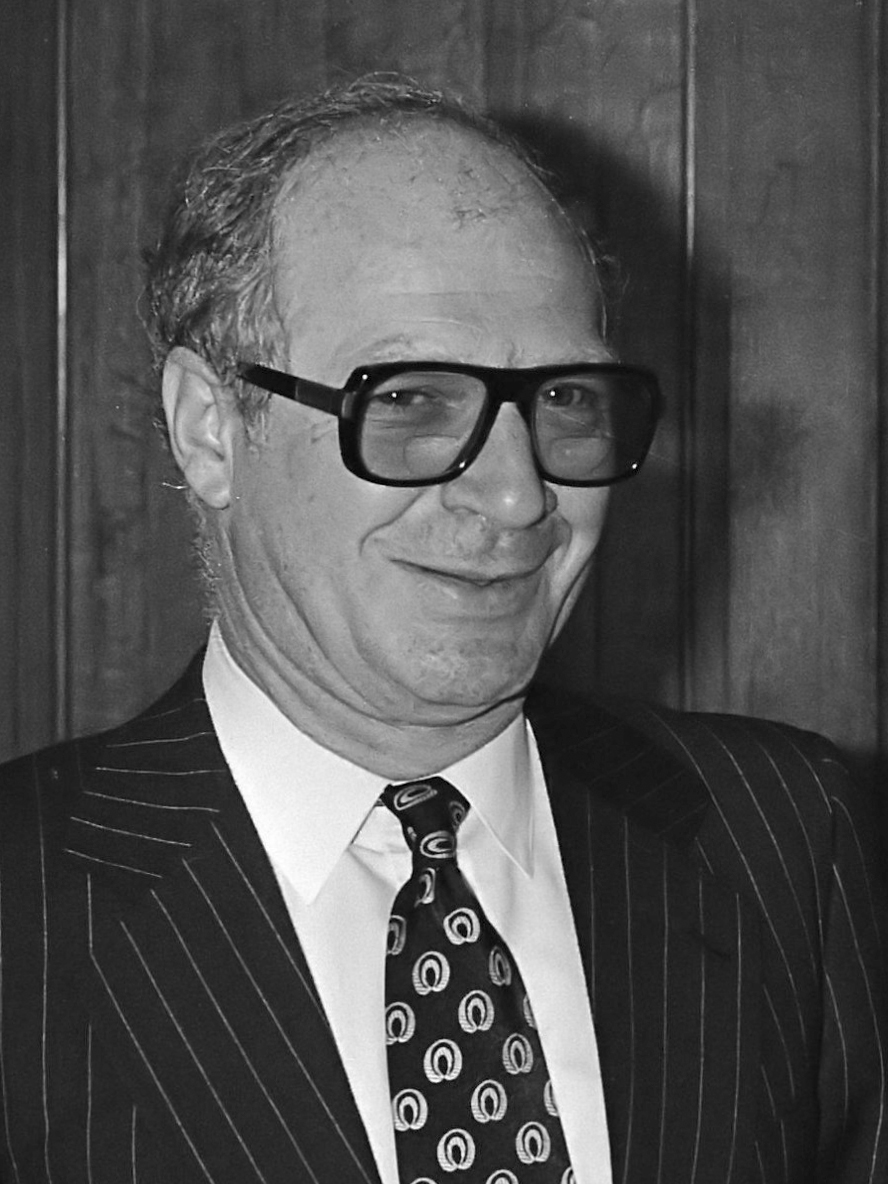
Willibald Pahr (1980)

Willibald P. Pahr (born in Vienna on 5 June 1930) is an Austrian politician and diplomat.

== Biography ==
From 1976 to 1983, he was Austrian Minister of Foreign Affairs, from 1983 to 1986 he served as Austrian ambassador to West Germany. From 1986 to 1989 he held the post of Secretary-General of the World Tourism Organization and from 1990 to 1995 he served as Commissioner for Refugees in the Austrian Ministry of the Interior.

Government offices
Preceded by Robert Lonati	Secretary-General of the UNWTO; 1986–1989	Succeeded by Antonio Enríquez Savignac
