= Redbeard (comics) =

Belgian comic book series

Redbeard

Redbeard (French: Barbe-Rouge) is a series of Belgian comic books, originally published in French, created by writer Jean-Michel Charlier and artist Victor Hubinon in 1959. After their deaths the series was continued by other writers and artists, including Jijé (Joseph Gillain), Christian Gaty, Patrice Pellerin, Jean Ollivier, Christian Perrissin and Marc Bourgne, Jean-Charles Kraehn and Stefano Carloni.

== Publications ==
The series was very popular in France, Belgium and The Netherlands, but has not yet been published in English. In the late 1970s and the early 1980s, most of the classic episodes were also published in Yugoslavia (in the Serbian) under the name Demon s Kariba (Demon of the Caribbean). In Croatia, the series was first published under the name Crvenobradi but later under the name Riđobradi (in Croatian). In Germany, the series is known under the name Der rote Korsar, and in Denmark 5 albums have been published under the name Rødskæg. In the 1960s (titled Κοκκινογένης) it was a part of the contents of Greek magazine Asterix, by Spanos editions In the 1970s two episodes were published in Finland, under the name Punaparta, and in Portugal five Barba Ruiva albums have been published.

== Characters ==
- Redbeard is a pirate of French origin. After a troublesome youth he went roaming the seven seas for gold and fortune on his ship, the Black Falcon. He has gathered a great fortune over the years, most of which was hidden in the Florida Everglades. But a lot of his fortune was needed to buy or repair his ships. He used to have a secret base on an uninhabited island, but this was destroyed first by the British, Spanish and Dutch forces and finally in a volcanic eruption. According to the later spin-off series, his real name supposedly is Jean-Baptiste Cornic.
- Eric Lerouge ("the red", although his hair is blond), is the adopted son of Redbeard. In fact, he can be seen as the main character of the series, despite the title, as some episodes deal with Eric and do not feature Redbeard at all. In 1715, Redbeard found young Eric during a raid on a ship, in which Eric's parents were killed. His true name and legacy were revealed later, in documents that Redbeard had taken during the attack. Eric's true name is Thierry de Montfort. He is a nobleman, but the claim to his father's name has been lost, so he feels destined to travel the seas. Eric dislikes the pirate life, however, and does not want to succeed Redbeard, wishing instead to choose to lead an honest life, but many obstacles lay in his path. He has studied at the Royal Navy in London under a false name. He tried to earn a living as a captain on a trade ship, but Redbeard keeps coming back into his life, needing him for one of his jobs.
- Tripod (called that for his wooden leg and walking stick) is Redbeard's right hand. He is an inventor, geographer, and also has great knowledge of surgery and strategy and speaks Latin fluently. He has multiple wooden legs, each containing hidden tools, medicines, or weapons. One leg is even modified into a rifle.
- Baba is an escaped slave of African origin, having been abducted by slave traders from the Gulf of Guinea. He was freed by Redbeard, and chose to remain as his loyal servant. Baba is as strong as a bull, and can swim like a dolphin. He had a sister named Aïcha, but she was killed in Algiers while helping Eric to escape.
- The Black Falcon is Redbeard's ship. There have been at least four different Falcons, as the ship sometimes is destroyed during battle. This first Falcon was a brig that was blown up by Redbeard himself after it was captured by the Spanish. The second Black Falcon was a three-masted barque, and it burned while being sieged by the pirate Alvarez. The third Falcon was also a three-masted barque, but with a very narrow hull. It also had extended rigging and bigger sails, that could be raised and lower from the deck itself. Next to regular cannons, it featured two extremely heavy cannons (30 cm caliber), named after Gog and Magog. Also there were 30 connected muskets, that could be fired at once. The ship could also drop naval mines. Finally, there was a hidden surprise in the form of Greek fire: copper tubes could spray this substance over the water and onto enemy ships. The ship gained its nickname "the ship from hell" in the siege of Algiers, causing mass mayhem and turning a great portion of the city into ashes. However, it was blown up again by Redbeard, as there was no escape possible from the Dardanelles near Istanbul. The fourth Black Falcon is again a regular three-masted barque.

== Asterix parody ==
Asterix parodies on the left, originals at right

Redbeard is parodied in the Asterix comic series. Since the album Asterix the Gladiator, a group of pirates appear in nearly every story, and their ship sinks at almost every meeting. Originally intended as a one-off joke, the pirates' appearance was so successful that they were fully integrated in the Astérix series. They were also featured in both the 1968 animated film Asterix and Cleopatra and the 2002 live-action film Asterix & Obelix: Mission Cleopatra, as well in three other animations: Asterix in Britain, Asterix Conquers America, Asterix and the Vikings and Asterix: The Secret of the Magic Potion.

The parody has its origins in the fact that Jean-Michel Charlier had worked with the authors of Asterix, René Goscinny and Albert Uderzo, in the founding of the Franco-Belgian comics magazine Pilote in 1959. This magazine was the launching vehicle for both Asterix and Redbeard.

Although in several countries of Continental Europe Redbeard is a popular comic series in its own right, the popularity of Asterix's pirates is one of the few occasions when parody figures have overshadowed their originals.

== Historical background ==
Redbeard's adventures mainly take place in the period between 1715 and 1750. The character of Redbeard is based on various historical pirates, like the Frenchman Robert Surcouf (1773–1827), as Charlier and Hubinon created three comics about him between 1949 and 1952, and these stories would later be the basis of this series. Also used are stories about the Turkish admiral Hayreddin Barbarossa (1483–1546), whose Italian name Barbarossa means "Red Beard". Parts of his cruel appearance might be based on the notorious Blackbeard, active in the Caribbean Sea, and his fame and success in the series resembles that of Bartholomew Roberts, who successfully captured over 450 ships.

A lot of what is going on in the stories is based on real history:

- In the first album, we get to know about the Viceroyalty of New Spain consisting of the territories of the Spanish Empire in the New World (North America, Central America, and the Caribbean). In the 18th century, the Spanish were often at war with the British, French, and Dutch.
- The album The Brand of the King takes place in the Mediterranean Sea, where galley slaves were marked with the French fleur de lis symbol, by using a hot stake. This album also features Barbary pirates.
- The Ghost Ship and Dead Man's Island feature the (fictional) treasure of the historical pirate Henry Morgan.
- The Spanish Ambush shows the court of the Spanish Viceroy in Cartagena.
- The Letter of Marque and Reprisal explains the difference between a pirate and a privateer.
- Albums 16 through 19 deal with the Ottoman Empire, including Istanbul and Algiers.
  - The climax of album 19 is based on the Bombardment of Algiers.
- Albums 21, 22, and 23 deal with the Aztecs: Although their civilisation was wiped out by the Spanish in about 1520, Redbeard finds a hidden city in the jungle of Yucatán with their last living descendants. (Historically Yucatán was home to the Mayan civilization, not the Aztecs.)
- Albums 26, 27, and 28 describe battles between the French and British in the Indian Ocean, especially between French gouvernor Joseph François Dupleix and the Briton Robert Clive. Also mentioned is the Maratha Empire, with its island fortress Suvarnadurg.
  - Album 28 also features the fictional daughter of the historical pirate Olivier Levasseur.
- Album 33 mentions the "Punchao": a big golden sun disk from an Inti temple, which is eventually found at Machu Picchu.

However, starting from the 31st album, The War of the Pirates (1997), historical errors start to appear. Writer Jean Ollivier brings Henry Morgan to the series as a living character, becoming the new governor of Jamaica. The real Morgan died in 1688, and Redbeard's first adventure (album 1) takes place in 1715; in fact, in album 7, The Ghost Ship (1966), Morgan is mentioned as being dead. In later albums by writer Christian Perrissin and artist Marc Bourgne, the character of Redbeard himself also changes dramatically. He gets more greedy, his love for Eric seems to be fading away, he seems to have no honour anymore, and he gets romantically involved with a girl but eventually he shoots her in the arm (which must then be amputated). None of these character features can be found in any of the previous albums.

Mentioned or visited are the French overseas territories in the New World, including Fort-de-France, Île de la Tortue, New Orleans, Saint Croix, Port-au-Prince, Bourbon, Pondichéry, and Fort Dauphin. The same is true of their Spanish counterparts, such as Cartagena, Veracruz, Mérida, Puerto Bello, Panama, and Cuzco, and the British territories Barbuda, Barbados, Grand Cayman, Kingston, Jaffna, and Saint Augustin.

== Albums ==
1. The Broken Compass (1959)
2. The Horror of the Seven Seas (1960)
3. The Young Captain (1979) *
4. The Captain Without a Name (1961)
5. The Brand of the King (1961)
6. Mutiny on the Ocean (1965)
7. The Ghost Ship (1966)
8. Dead Man's Island (1967)
9. The Spanish Ambush (1968)
10. The Downfall of the Black Falcon (1969)
11. The Reckoning (1970)
12. The Treasure of Redbeard (1971)
13. The Letter of Marque and Reprisal (1971)
14. The Liberation of Fort-de-France (1972)
15. The Invisible Pirate (1972)
16. Fight with the Moors (1973)
17. The Prisoner (1973)
18. The Ship from Hell (1974)
19. Hellfire (1979)
20. Island of the Missing Ships (1980)
21. The Missing of the Black Falcon (1982)
22. The Cursed Gold of Huacapac (1987)
23. The City of Death (1987)
24. Con with Slaves (1983)
25. Uprise in Jamaica (1987)
26. Pirates in Indian Waters (1991)
27. The Grand-Mongol (1992)
28. The Pirate of the Merciless (1994)
29. Fight over Tortuga (1995)
30. Gold and Glory (1996)
31. The War of the Pirates (1997)
32. The Shadow of the Devil (1999)
33. The Path of the Inca (2000)
34. The Secret of Elisa Davis – part 1 (2001)
35. The Secret of Elisa Davis – part 2 (2004)

* Previously unpublished chapter, also contains two short prequel stories:

- The Gold of the San Christobal
- The Cobra

== Ending and sequel series ==
After Victor Hubinon died unexpectedly in 1979, Jijé (Joseph Gillain) took over. But when he also died, the series was almost ended, as Jean-Michel Charlier believed nobody could take over. However, he finally managed to find not one, but two artists: Christian Gaty and Patrice Pellerin. As Charlier wrote in the book "lUprise In Jamaica (1987): "Why not have two different artists? If James Bond can be played by different actors, so can Redbeard." Charlier himself died in 1989. The series was then continued by Jean Ollivier and Gaty in 1991, with the addition: The New Adventures, but in 1999, the title was changed back to just 'Redbeard'.

In 2006 the publisher Dargaud announced the end of the series, as it would not be appealing anymore to youngsters, who were the original target audience. Artist Marc Bourgne, however, expressed that a comeback for the series could occur sometime.

In 2019, Dargaud announced the new adventures of Redbeard, written by Jean-Charles Kraehn and drawn by Stefano Carloni. The new volume was published in 2020 and continues Redbeard's adventures as he is tasked by a town governor to catch a pirate terrorizing the Carolinas.

== Spin-off ==
Since 1996 there is also a spin-off series, called The Young Years of Redbeard, created by different authors than the main series: the scenario is by Christian Perrissin and the artist is Daniel Redondo.

These stories deal with Redbeard's youth before he was a pirate and how he decided to become one. His name is given as Jean-Baptiste Cornic, a servant of the French king. Also explained is how he lost his eye.

- The Brothers of the Coast (1996)
- The Lion Pit (1997)
- The Duel of the Captains (1998)
- The Island of the Red Devil (1999)
- The Mutineers of Port Royal (2001)

== Television ==
Barbe-Rouge DVD cover.

In 1997 the animated series Barbe-Rouge was made by the French TF1 and Italian RAI. This series consists of twenty-six 24-minute episodes. It has also been broadcast in England, Republic of Ireland, Zimbabwe and Canada (as "Captain Red Beard"), Poland (as Rudobrody), Norway (as Kaptein Rødskjegg), Italy (as Barbarossa), and Greece (as Κοκκινογένης Πειρατής). The episodes were written by Jean Cubaud, with animation by Pasquale Moreau and Thibault Deschamps of PRH Création Images. In 2005, a DVD with five episodes of the animated Redbeard series was released in France (Barbe-Rouge). Teletoon broadcast the show in Canada during 1998.
