= Victor Hubinon =

Belgian comics artist

- Born: 26 April 1924 Angleur, Belgium
- Died: 8 January 1979 (aged 54) Villemy, Belgium
- Areas: Writer, Artist
- Pseudonyms: Hubinon, Victor Hughes, Charvick
- Notable works: Buck Danny; Redbeard
- Awards: full list

Victor Hubinon (26 April 1924 – 8 January 1979) was a Belgian comic-book artist, best known for the series Buck Danny and Redbeard.

== Biography ==
Victor Hubinon was born in Angleur, Belgium, in 1924. He studied at the Arts Academy of Liège and fled to England later during World War II, where he served in the Royal Navy. After the war ended, he returned to Belgium and when he was 22, he started working as an illustrator for the newspaper La Meuse. He got a contract with businessman and journalist Georges Troisfontaines, who started the press agency "World Press". There, Hubinon met Jean-Michel Charlier, another illustrator for the agency.

They first collaborated on a short comic story, but Troisfontaines created for them a new hero, Buck Danny, about a trio of fictional American pilots in World War II. Troisfontaines dropped out after he had written the first fifteen pages, whereupon Charlier and Hubinon continued it on their own. Quite soon, Charlier quit drawing and specialized in writing the stories, while Hubinon did all the artwork. The strip appeared in Spirou magazine, the comics weekly of publisher Dupuis, and became over the next thirty years one of the most popular and enduring series of the magazine. After 50 years, more than 20 million albums had been sold. Unusual about the series was that it kept very securely up to date, with the heroes always flying in the most recent planes and participating in current events.

Hubinon experimented with humoristic, caricatural stories in his early years as a comics artist. He even made one story about Blondin et Cirage, two heroes created by Jijé, but thereafter, the series returned to Jijé, and Hubinon mostly stuck to his realistic work, such as Buck Danny, the biographies of Surcouf, Stanley and Jean Mermoz, and a fictionalized retelling of the Battle of Tarawa.

When Charlier, together with a few friends like René Goscinny, created the new Pilote magazine in 1959, he wrote for Hubinon the realistic pirate series Redbeard, which would continue for some twenty years. The pirate crew in this series was the inspiration for their comical counterpart in the other main series of Pilote, Asterix.

In 1977, Hubinon created a new series, La Mouette, with stories by Gigi Maréchal. He died in 1979 from a heart attack, before the second part of the series was finished.

== Bibliography ==
Series	Years	Volumes	Writer	Publisher	Remarks
Buck Danny	1948–1979	40	Jean-Michel Charlier	Dupuis	Characters invented by Georges Troisfontaines. Artwork continued by Francis Bergèse
Blondin et Cirage	1951	1	Jijé	Dupuis	Previous and later albums drawn by Jijé
Fifi	1951	1	Eddy Paape	I.P. Bruxelles	
Tiger Joe	1951–1977	3	Jean-Michel Charlier	La Libre Belgique and Deligne	
Tarawa, atoll sanglant	1951	1	Jean-Michel Charlier	Dupuis	Additional artwork by Albert Weinberg and Eddy Paape: fictionalized account of the Battle of Tarawa
Surcouf	1951–1953	3	Jean-Michel Charlier	Dupuis	Biographical comic
Stanley	1954–1955	2	Octave Joly	Dupuis	Biographical comic
Jean Mermoz	1956	1	Jean-Michel Charlier	Dupuis	Biographical comic
Barbe-Rouge (Redbeard)	1961–1981	18	Jean-Michel Charlier	Dargaud	Continued by Jijé, Lorg, René Pellerin, Christian Gaty and M. Bourgne
Pistolin	1999	1	René Goscinny	Vents d'Ouest	The title series of the magazine Pistolin which ran from 1955 to 1958

== Awards and honors ==
- 1971: Best realistic artwork at the Prix Saint-Michel, Brussels, Belgium
- Asteroid 301511 Hubinon, discovered by French amateur astronomer Bernard Christophe in 2009, was named in his memory. The official naming citation was published by the Minor Planet Center on 12 March 2017 (M.P.C. 103971).
