= Jean-Michel Charlier =

Belgian comics writer (1924-1989)

- Charlier in 1984
- Born: 30 October 1924 Liège, Belgium
- Died: 10 July 1989 (aged 64) Saint-Cloud, France
- Area: Writer
- Notable works: Buck Danny; Barbe-Rouge; Blueberry
- Awards: full list

Jean-Michel Charlier (French: [ʒɑ̃ miʃɛl ʃaʁlije]; 30 October 1924 – 10 July 1989) was a Belgian comics writer. He was a co-founder of the famed Franco-Belgian comics magazine Pilote.

== Life ==
Charlier was born in Liège, Belgium, in 1924. In 1945 he got a job as a draughtsman in Brussels with World Press, the syndicate of Georges Troisfontaines, which worked mainly for Spirou magazine. The following year he and artist Victor Hubinon created the four-page comic strip L'Agonie du Bismarck. Charlier wrote the script and also drew the ships and airplanes. In 1947, Charlier and Hubinon began the long-running air-adventure comic strip Buck Danny. After a few years, Charlier stopped all work on the drawings and concentrated only on the scenarios, on the advice of Jijé, then the senior artist at Spirou.

Unable to support himself writing comic scripts at a time when Dupuis concentrated almost solely on the magazine and albums were few and far between, Charlier qualified for a pilot's license in 1949 and briefly flew for the airline SABENA.

However the following year Charlier returned to comic strips, collaborating with Hubinon once again to create Tiger Joe for La Libre Junior, the weekly comics supplement to the journal La Libre Belgique. Charlier also continued to supply scripts for Spirou magazine, collaborating with Eddy Paape on the strip Valhardi and, in 1955, with future Asterix artist Albert Uderzo on the comic strip Belloy. Together with Hubinon, he also created some biographical comics like Jean Mermoz and Surcouf. Other long-running series he started for Spirou in the early 1950s were La Patrouille des Castors for Mitacq, and in 1951 Les Vraies Histoires de l'Oncle Paul (Uncle Paul's true stories), a weekly comic of four pages telling a true story. The latter series was continued from 1954 on by Octave Joly and was a place where many young talents published their first comics, including Jean Graton, René Follet and Hermann Huppen.

Charlier, Hubinon, Uderzo, and comic-strip writer René Goscinny founded the comics agency Edifrance and the magazine Pistolin in 1955, and the influential magazine Pilote in 1959. Charlier was editor-in-chief and also wrote two stories for the first issue: Redbeard with Hubinon and Tanguy and Laverdure with Uderzo – these latter two characters would later get their own TV series as well: Les Chevaliers du Ciel, featuring Tanguy and Laverdure, was made by ORTF between 1967 and 1969, an English-dubbed version of the show being released under the title The Aeronauts.

Of seminal importance for the cultural phenomenon bandes dessinée turned out to be Charlier's initiative as publishing co-editor to start a line of comic book books for Dargaud (which bought out Pilote in 1960), collecting the stories as serialized in Pilote, becoming in effect Dargaud's first comic book releases. The first title in the series, coined La Collection Pilote, was the first adventure of Asterix from Uderzo and Goscinny, a runaway success right from the bat, followed by 16 comic titles from the magazine, with the first Blueberry adventure, Fort Navajo, becoming the last to be released in 1965. After that, the collection was suspended and each comic hero hitherto featured therein, spun off in a book series of their own. In order to give these releases a more "mature" image, the books were from the very start executed as hardcover editions for France, though they were, somewhat ironically, executed in softcover for Charlier's own native Belgium. More than favorably received, however, the collection has attained a mythical status in the world of Franco-Belgian comics.

Charlier visited the United States in 1963 and a tour of the American West inspired him to create Fort Navajo, a western series, for Pilote. He chose an artist Jean Giraud (Moebius), then a commercial illustrator who had briefly worked with Jijé on Jerry Spring, a popular European western strip. Fort Navajo, later renamed Blueberry or Lieutenant Blueberry after its main character, became a popular and innovative graphic novel. In 1972 friction among the staff at Pilote caused Charlier to give up his editorial position and he worked in French television until 1976. He then worked as editor-in-chief for two years at Tintin magazine. He continued to write Blueberry and Buck Danny stories.

Jean-Michel Charlier died in Saint-Cloud, France, in 1989. His main series are all continued by other writers, often chosen by Charlier himself.

== Awards ==
- 1971: (Belgium) "Best Realistic Writing" Prix Saint-Michel from the city of Brussels.
- 1973: (United States) Shazam Award of the Academy of Comic Book Arts for Lieutenant Blueberry in the category "Best Foreign Comic Series", shared with Jean Giraud.
- 1973: (France) Prix Phénix, Paris, in the category "Scenario d'Aventures".

== Bibliography ==
| Series | Years | Volumes | Artist | Publisher | Remarks |
|---|---|---|---|---|---|
| Buck Danny | 1948–1988 | 44 | Victor Hubinon (1-40) and Francis Bergèse (41-44) | Dupuis, Novedi and Hachette | Continued by Bergèse alone |
| Fanfan et Polo Aviateurs | 1951 | 1 | Dino Attanasio | La Libre Belgique | |
| Tarawa, atoll sanglant | 1951 | 1 | Victor Hubinon and Albert Weinberg | Dupuis | |
| Surcouf | 1951–1953 | 3 | Victor Hubinon | Dupuis | |
| Tiger Joe | 1951–1977 | 3 | Hubinon | La Libre Belgique and Deligne | Spiritually succeeded by Kim Devil |
| Oncle Paul | 1953–1955 | 12 | Various artists, including Eddy Paape and Jean Graton | Dupuis | Additional stories by Octave Joly |
| Valhardi | 1953–1975 | 6 | Eddy Paape and Jijé | Dupuis and Deligne | Created by Jean Doisy |
| Kim Devil | 1955–1957 | 4 | Gérald Forton | Dupuis | Continuation of Tiger Joe under a different name due to publisher change |
| La Patrouille des Castors | 1955–1984 | 23 | Mitacq | Dupuis | Continued by Mitacq alone |
| Jean Mermoz | 1956 | 1 | Victor Hubinon | Dupuis | |
| Marc Dacier | 1960–1982 | 13 | Eddy Paape | Dupuis | |
| Tanguy et Laverdure | 1961–1988 | 25 | Albert Uderzo, Jijé, Serres and Coutelis | Dargaud, Le Lombard, Fleurus, Novedi and Hachette | |
| Barbe-Rouge (Redbeard) | 1961–1991 | 26 | Victor Hubinon, Jijé, Lorg, Gaty and Patrice Pellerin | Dargaud, Fleurus, Novedi and Hachette | |
| Blueberry | 1965–1990 | 23 | Jean Giraud | Dargaud, Fleurus, Novedi, Hachette, Alpen, and Dupuis | |
| La jeunesse de Blueberry | 1975–1990 | 6 | Jean Giraud and Colin Wilson | Dargaud, Novedi, and Alpen | |
| Guy Lebleu | 1976 | 2 | Raymond Poïvet | Glénat | Originally created in 1961 |
| Belloy | 1977 | 4 | Albert Uderzo | Deligne | Originally created in 1948 |
| André Lefort | 1978 | 1 | Eddy Paape | Bédéscope | Originally created in 1956 |
| Jim Cutlass | 1979 | 1 | Jean Giraud | Les Humanoïdes Associés | |
| Les Gringos | 1979–1980 | 2 | Victor de la Fuente | Fleurus | |
| Jacques Le Gall | 1980–1985 | 4 | Mitacq | Dupuis | Originally created in 1959 |
| Brice Bolt | 1984–1985 | 2 | Aldoma Puig | Dupuis | Originally created in 1971 |
| Ron Clarke | 1991 | 1 | J. Armand | Alpen | |
| Clairette | 1997 | 1 | Albert Uderzo | Antarès | Originally created in 1957 |
