= 1980 in comics =

Notable events of 1980 in comics.

== Events and publications ==
=== Year overall ===
- Big Rapids Distribution, a major Midwestern comics distributor, goes under, and two former employees (John Davis and Milton Griepp), form Capital City Distribution, headquartered in Madison, Wisconsin.
- Notable alternative titles RAW, World War 3 Illustrated, and Reid Fleming, World's Toughest Milkman, all make their debuts.
- "The Dark Phoenix Saga" runs in X-Men #129–138 (January–October), by Chris Claremont, John Byrne, and Terry Austin (Marvel Comics).
- "Wanted: Santa Claus – Dead or Alive!" the first Batman story drawn by Frank Miller is published in DC Special Series #21 (Spring 1980)
- "Metamorphosis Odyssey", a long-running storyline by Jim Starlin, runs in Epic Illustrated.
- Marvel Comics phases out Curtis Magazines, its black-and-white magazine imprint.
- FantaCo Enterprises, which began as a retailer in 1978, begins publishing comics, starting with Fred Hembeck's The Hembeck Series.
- In the Netherlands the first edition of the comics festival Stripdagen is organized by the Dutch comics appreciation society Het Stripschap.
- In Worcester, Massachusetts, Paul Howley opens the comics store That's Entertainment.

=== January ===
- 1 January: on San Francisco Chronicle, first strip of The far side, by Gary Larson.
- 19 January. In Action Deluxe, the first chapter of Domu A child's dream, by Katsushiro Otomo.
- The Amazing Spider-Man #200: "The Spider and the Burglar," by Marv Wolfman, Stan Lee (script, page 47), Keith Pollard, and Jim Mooney. (Marvel Comics)
- Legion of Super-Heroes vol. 2 debuts, starting with issue #259, picking up the numbering from Superboy and the Legion of Super-Heroes (1949 series) (originally titled Superboy).
- La vie passionnée de Thérèse d'Avila (The passionate life of Theresa of Avila) – by Claire Brétecher, pre-published the year before in Le nouvel Observateur, biography of the Spanish saint, humorous and irreverent without being profane.
- La fille sous la dunette (The girl under the poop deck), by François Bourgeon, first album of the sea adventure series Le passagers du vent.
- Nez cassè (Broken nose) by Jean-Michel Charlier and Jean Giraud, first album of the “fugitive Blueberry” trilogy.
- Premieres chasses (First hunting) – by Derib.

=== February ===
- First issue of Savage She-Hulk, by Stan Lee and John Buscema; She-Hulk makes her debut.
- "Fiends of the Eastern Front," a 2000 AD storyline runs in issues #152–161, February–April, by Gerry Finley-Day and Carlos Ezquerra (IPC Media)
- First issue of the Italian magazine Totem, specialized in French fantasy and sci-fi comics but hosting also Milo Manara's Giuseppe Bergman.

=== March ===
- March 1: in Pilote, Métro Châtelet, direction Cassiopée by Pierre Christin and Jean-Claude Mèzieres is prepublished.
- March 26 La spirale du temps by Roger Leloup (Dupuis)
- Detective Comics, with issue #488, resumes monthly publication. (DC Comics)
- With issue #26, DC cancels Men of War (1977 series).
- Superboy Spectacular #1, DC's first direct sales-only title.
- First issue of King Conan by Roy Thomas and John Buscema (Marvel)
- First issue of the Italian edition of 1984.

=== April ===
- April 30: The first episode of Peter Pontiac's punk comic Gaga is printed. The series will run until 1988.
- L’enfant grec (The Greek child), by Jacques Martin.

=== May ===
- May 25: first issue of the Italian erotic series La poliziotta by Renzo Barbieri (Edifumetto).
- Terrore dal sesto pianeta (Terror from the sixth planet) – by Guido Nolitta and Gallieno Ferri, one of the best Zagor's sagas, mixing western and sci-fi; the hero has to fight again his nemesis, the mad doctor Hellingen, and his allies the evil aliens Akronians.

=== June ===
- June 1: Le secret de la salamandre by Jacques Tardi, 5th album of Adele Blanc-Sec series (A suivre).
- June 5: on Spriou, The olympic smurfs by Peyo.
- June 14: The first gag of Toon van Driel's De Stamgasten is printed in Algemeen Dagblad.
- First issue of the Italian magazine I grandi classici Disney, reprinting Disney comics; the first number contains the 1974 saga Il mistero del totem decapitato (The headless totem's mystery)
- Asterix and the great divide, by Uderzo (who, for the first time, cares also the Asterix's texts).
- L’uomo del grande Nord (The Great North man) – by Hugo Pratt; debut of Jesuit Joe.
- In Linus, Nostalgia by Guido Crepax (Valentina series).

=== July ===
- The Unexpected #200: Edited by Jack C. Harris. (DC Comics)
- The Untold Legend of the Batman #1, debut of three-issue mini-series and John Byrne's first work for DC Comics. (DC Comics)
- John Byrne's first issue as writer/artist of Fantastic Four is #220. While this is his first issue with those credits, his long, five-year run begins with issue 232.
- Raw #1, debut of comix and graphics magazine edited by Art Spiegelman and Françoise Mouly.
- First issue of Big Robot (Bianconi), Italian comic miming the mecha anime.
- La Foire aux immortels by Enki Bilal, first chapter of The Nikopol trilogy.
- In 2000 AD, debut of Nemesis the Warlock, by Pat Mills and Kevin O’Neill

=== August ===
- August 1: in Le journal de Tintin, La Dernière Île, by Grzegorz Rosiński and André-Paul Duchâteau, first episode of the sci-fi series Hans.
- August 29: Writer Steve Gerber sues Marvel Comics over rights to his character, Howard the Duck in a lawsuit filed in the U. S. District Court for Los Angeles.
- Weird Western Tales, with issue #70, canceled by DC.
- In the French magazine A suivre, first chapter of La casa dorata di Samarcanda (The golden house in Samarcanda) by Hugo Pratt.

=== September ===
- September 12: The Turkish satirical magazine Girgir is temporary banned by the Turkish government, following the 1980 Turkish coup d'état, because of a satirical cartoon, which "insults the Turkish national identity".
- September 20: The Tornado name is dropped from the 2000 AD comic book.
- DC Comics Presents #25, the "Whatever Happened to...?" backup feature began and would appear in most issues for the next two years until its last installment in issue #48 (Aug. 1982).
- Mystery in Space revived by DC (after a 14-year hiatus), picking up with issue #111, continuing the old numbering.
- The Brave and the Bold #166, featuring the first appearance of Nemesis (Tom Tresser) (DC Comics)
- With issue #20, Marvel cancels Shogun Warriors.

=== October ===
- October 24: Eric Schreurs breaks the world record drawing comics by continuing for 25 hours and 8 minutes straight. It lands him in the Guinness Book of Records.
- October 30 : in Le journal de Spirou, début of Les innnommables, by Yann le Pennetier and Didier Conrad.
- David Boswell self-publishes Reid Fleming, World's Toughest Milkman, a title later published by Eclipse Comics and Deep Sea Comics.
- Thor #300: Double-sized anniversary issue, by Mark Gruenwald, Ralph Macchio, Keith Pollard, and Gene Day. (Marvel Comics)
- The Avengers #200: "The Child is Father to...?" by Jim Shooter (plot), George Pérez (plot), Bob Layton (plot), David Michelinie (plot; script), George Pérez (breakdowns), and Dan Green (finished art). (Marvel Comics)
- DC Comics Presents #26: features an insert previewing the upcoming New Teen Titans series by Marv Wolfman and George Pérez.
- At Lucca comics & games, the number 0 of the author comics’ magazine L’eternauta is presented.
- L'Inconnu des 1000 pistes (The Unknown of 1000 tracks) by Jean Graton.
- La longue marche (The long walk) by Jean-Michel Charlier and Jean Giraud, second album of the “fugitive Blueberry” trilogy.
- Le ponton (The pontoon), by François Bourgeon, second album of the sea adventure series Le passagers du vent.
- In Alter alter, first chapter of the sci-fi saga Zasaffir, by Guido Buzzelli, and debut of the antihero Marcel Labrune, by Attillio Micheluzzi.

=== November ===
- Stewart the rat by Steve Gerber and Gene Colan (Eclipse).
- The 2000th issue of The Beano dated 15 November 1980.
- First issue of the magazine Frigidaire, reckoning the best talents of the Italian underground comix, from Andrea Pazienza to Tanino Liberatore. The first number contains Joe Galaxy and the perfidious Callisto 4.’s lizards, demented sci-fi parody by Massimo Mattioli, and the first chapter of The Blue dahlia, from a Raymond Chandler's script, by Filippo Scozzari

=== December ===
- December 1: Larry Wright's Kit 'n' Carlyle makes its debut. It will run until 2015.
- December 3: Pierre Makyo and Alain Dodier launch the comics series Les Aventures de Gully, which will continue for a decade.
- December 8 : first strip of Bloom County by Berkeley Breathed.
- The first episode of Moebius and Alejandro Jodorowsky's L'Incal is published in Métal Hurlant.
- Marvel Team-Up #100: Double-size anniversary issue, "And Introducing — Karma! She Possesses People!," by Chris Claremont, Frank Miller, and Bob Wiacek. The issue also contains a backup story featuring the Black Panther and Storm, from the X-Men, by Claremont and John Byrne, with inks by McLeod. (Marvel Comics)
- The first chapter of Art Spiegelman's Maus appears in Raw #2.
- Necdet Sen begins publishing his cartoon, Hizli Gazeteci in the Turkish magazine "Hey".
- Last issue of the Italian magazine Il Mago.
- La fine della pista (The end of the trail), final chapter of the epic saga Storia del West, by Gino D’Antonio and Renato Polese.

=== Specific date unknown ===
- Jan Kruis wins the Stripschapprijs.
- Yvan Delporte founds the Upchic Union Professionelle des Créateurs d’Histoires en Images et de Cartoons), the first special interest group for Belgian comics artists. It will exist until 1997.
- In the Spanish edition of 1984, Zora y los Hibernautas, by Fernando Fernandez.
- In Corriere dei Piccoli, Il nonno selvaggio (The savage grandfather) by Bianca Pitzorno and Cinzia Ghigliano.

== Deaths ==
=== January ===
- January 24: Joe King, American illustrator and comics artist (Gabby, continued Radiomania and The Tinymites), dies at age 75.
- January 31: Ferdinand Bis, A.K.A. Ferdo Bis, Croatian comics artist and animator (drew realistic adventure comics), dies at age 69.

=== February ===
- February 10: Norman W. Marsh, American comics artist (Dan Dunn, Danny Hale), dies at age 81 or 82.
- February 25: Georges Mazure, Dutch comics artist (Myra van Dijk, Jacqueline, Mignon, Paula, continued Spot Morton, Horre, Harm en Hella), dies at age 60.

=== March ===
- March 1: Leon A. Beroth, American painter and comics artist (Don Winslow of the Navy, Kitten Kaye, Tom, Dick & Harry), dies at age 85.
- March 1: Richard Allen "Dick" Dillin, American comics artist (Blackhawk, Justice League of America), dies at age 50.
- March 9: Konstantin Kuznjecov, Russian illustrator, caricaturist and comics artist, dies at age 84.
- March 14: Arie Pleysier, Dutch journalist and comics writer (Snuffelgraag en Knagelijntje, Dikkie en Dirkie Durf), dies at age 89.
- March 28: Helena Bochořáková-Dittrichová, Czech illustrator, painter and comics artist (Z Mého Dětství (From my Childhood)), dies at age 85.

=== April ===
- April 17: Stig Cederholm, Swedish novelist and comics writer (Åsa-Nisse), dies at age 75.
- April 21: Leendert Jordaan, Dutch illustrator and comics artist (Het Leven in Karikatuur), dies at age 94.

=== May ===
- May 5: Carl Pfeufer, American sculptor, illustrator, comics artist (Don Dixon and the Hidden Empire, Chisholm Kid, celebrity comics based on Tom Mix, continued Sub-Mariner), dies at age 69.
- May 9: Norman Mingo, American illustrator who designed many covers for Mad Magazine including their mascot Alfred E. Neuman, dies at age 84.

=== June ===
- June 2: Joseph Samachson, American biochemist, novelist, TV script writer and comics writer (DC Comics, co-creator of Martian Manhunter and Tomahawk), dies of Parkinson's disease at age 73.
- June 14: Peter Kuch, Canadian comics artist (Sally Brown), dies at age 62.
- June 19: Jijé, Belgian comics artist (Blondin et Cirage, Jerry Spring and who continued Spirou et Fantasio), dies age 66.

=== July ===
- July 18: Ger Sligte, Dutch illustrator and comics artist (Mieke Meijer, Bertje Branie), dies at age 65.
- July 20: Comic illustrator and creator Rafael Gruber dies at age 69.

=== August ===
- August 10: Karel Verschuere, Belgian comics artist (Studio Vandersteen, Bessy, De Rode Ridder), dies from cancer at age 55.
- August 26: Tex Avery, American animator, comics artist and film director (Bugs Bunny, Daffy Duck, Droopy), dies at age 72.

=== September ===
- September 7: Whitney Ellsworth, American comics editor, artist and writer (Batman, Little Linda), dies at age 71.
- September 14: Imre Sebök, Hungarian painter, illustrator and comics artist, dies at age 74.

=== November ===
- November 14: René Klapac, Czech comics artist (Kačák detektiv (Detective the Duck), Punt'a, Optík a Pesík), dies at age 75.
- November 19: Huib de Ru, Dutch painter, glass artist and comics artist (comics for magazine Kleine Wij), dies at age 78.
- November 25: Al Vermeer, American comic artist (Drawing Cards, Priscilla's Pop), dies at age 69.
- November 29: John Putnam, American comics writer, artist and designer (Mad Magazine, created their running gags Arthur the potted plant and the Mad Zeppelin), dies from pneumonia at age 63.

=== December ===
- December 8:
  - John Lennon, British rock musician (drew a few comics and sequential illustrations during his music career), dies at age 40.
  - Mel Cummin, American illustrator and comics artist (Good Time Guy), dies at age 85.
- December 13: R. D. Low, British comics writer (wrote for The Beano), dies at age 85.
- Specific date unknown: Dick Briefer, American comics artist (Target and the Targeteers, Frankenstein), dies at age 65.

=== Specific date unknown ===
- Adriana Cristina, Italian comics artist (Disney comics), dies at an unknown age.
- Alan Hanley, American comics artist (Alan Hanley's Comic Book), dies at age 40 or 41 in a car accident.
- William Francis Marshall, British illustrator and comics artist, dies at age 78 or 79.
- Al Vermeer, American comics artist (Priscilla's Pop), dies at age 68 or 69.
- Harry Winslade, AKA Redvers Blake, British comic artist (Judy and Pat, Don Conquest, Nigel Tawny), dies at age 68 or 69.

== Conventions ==
- Charlotte Mini-Con (Charlotte, North Carolina) — one-day event held at local mall by Shelton Drum, owner of the comics retailer Heroes Aren't Hard To Find (and future founder of HeroesCon)
- FantaCon 2 (Albany, New York) — official guests include Berni Wrightson, Raoul Vezina, John Caldwell, Jeff Jones, Richard & Wendy Pini, Joe Staton, and Fred Hembeck
- March 15–16: Long Island Comic Book Convention (Holiday Inn, Rockville Center, New York)
- April 12 or April 19: "Convention to celebrate the 30th anniversary of Eagle" ("Central London Hotel," London, England) — produced by A.C.E./Denis Gifford
- June 14–16: Comicon (Australia) II (Sheraton Hotel, Melbourne, Australia) — 2nd iteration of this show
- June 20–22: Houstoncon (Houston, Texas) — official guests include George Pérez
- July 4–6: Comic Art Convention (Statler Hilton Hotel, New York City) — special guests Boris Vallejo and Michael Kaluta; other guests: Bob Kane, Fred Hembeck, Wendy and Richard Pini, John Caldwell Norman Mingo, Harlan Ellison, Bob Boze Bell, and Dave Simons
- July 18–20: Chicago Comicon (Pick-Congress Hotel, Chicago, Illinois) — guest of honor: Roy Thomas; other guests: Frank Brunner, Dave Manak, Frank Miller, Josef Rubinstein, Roger Stern, Laurie S. Sutton, Chris Claremont, Jack C. Harris, Paul Kupperberg, Paul Levitz, Al Milgrom, Steve Mitchell, Joe Staton, Len Wein, and Marv Wolfman
- July 25–27: Atlanta Fantasy Fair VI (Dunfey's Royal Coach, Atlanta, Georgia) — official guests include Robert Bloch
- July 30 – August 3: San Diego Comic-Con (Convention and Performing Arts Center and U.S. Grant Hotel, San Diego, California) — 5,000 attendees; official guests: John Byrne, Chris Claremont, Mike Grell, Paul Gulacy, Larry Niven, Joe Orlando, Richard Pini, Wendy Pini, Jerry Pournelle, Osamu Tezuka, Adam West, Wally Wood
- August: Atlanta Fantasy Fair VI (Dunfey's Royal Coach, Atlanta, Georgia) — official guests include Robert Bloch; Gil Kane is a scheduled guest, but doesn't make it
- August 23: Denver Minicon (Ground Round Restaurant, Denver, Colorado)
- September: OrlandoCon (Orlando, Florida) — guests include Gil Kane, Jock Mahoney and Autumn Russell
- October 18–19: Marvel Comics Film & Fantasy Convention (Lawrence Hall, London, U.K.) — sponsored by Starburst magazine (at that point owned by Marvel Comics); presentation of the Starburst Awards; Guest of Honor: Ray Harryhausen; other guests include Archie Goodwin, Syd Jordan, Bill Sienkiewicz, Barry Morse, Paul Darrow, Jacqueline Pearce, Ingrid Pitt, Caroline Munro, Dana Gillespie, David Prowse, Peter Mayhew, Milton Subotsky, Roy Ashton, Martin Bower, Harley Cokeliss, Mat Irvine, Brian Johnson, Terrance Dicks, David Maloney, Dick Mills, and Richard O'Brien; presentation of the Eagle Awards
- October 26–November 2: Salone Internazionale dei Comics a.k.a. "Lucca 14" (Lucca, Italy)
- November: Mid-Ohio Con (Mansfield, Ohio) — first staging of this annual event, produced by Roger A. Price
- December: Katy-Kon (Santa Barbara, California) — first convention dedicated to Katy Keene

== Awards ==
=== Eagle Awards ===
Presented in 1981 for comics published in 1980:

- Favourite Artist (UK): Brian Bolland

== First issues by title ==
=== DC Comics ===
New Teen Titans

Release: November. Writer: Marv Wolfman. Artist: George Pérez.

The New Adventures of Superboy

Release: January. Writer: Cary Bates. Artists: Kurt Schaffenberger and Dave Hunt.

=== Marvel Comics ===
Epic Illustrated

Release: Spring. Editor: Archie Goodwin.

Savage She-Hulk

Release: February. Writer: Stan Lee. Artist: John Buscema.

Moon Knight

Release: November. Writer: Doug Moench. Artist: Bill Sienkiewicz

=== Independent titles ===
Gay Comix

Release: September by Kitchen Sink Press. Editor: Howard Cruse.

RAW

Release: July by RAW Books. Editors: Art Spiegelman and Françoise Mouly.

Reid Fleming, World's Toughest Milkman

Release: October by David Boswell. Writer/Artist: David Boswell.

Thorgal

Release: by Lombard Editions. Writer: Jean Van Hamme. Artist: Grzegorz Rosiński.

Tinkle

Release: April by India Book House. Editor: Anant Pai.

World War 3 Illustrated

Editors: Seth Tobocman and Peter Kuper.

Queen Millennia

Release: January 28 by Sankei Shimbun and Nishinippon Sports. Writer/Artist: Leiji Matsumoto.

Nutty

Release: 16 February by DC Thomson

=== Shueisha ===
You

== Initial appearances by character name ==
=== DC Comics ===
- Cheetah (Deborah Domaine) in Wonder Woman #274 (December)
- Creature Commandos in Weird War Tales #93 (November )
- Cyborg in DC Comics Presents #26 (October)
- Deathstroke in The New Teen Titans #2 (December)
- Doctor Alchemy in The Flash #287 (July)
- Insect Queen in Superman Family #203 (October)
- Mister E in Secrets of Haunted House #31 (December)
- Mongul in DC Comics Presents #27
- Nemesis in The Brave and the Bold #166 (September)
- Rainbow Raider in The Flash #286 (June)
- Ravager in The New Teen Titans #1 (December)
- Raven in DC Comics Presents #26 (October)
- Silas Stone in DC Comics Presents #26 (October)
- Starfire in DC Comics Presents #26 (October)
- Starman (Prince Gavyn) in Adventure Comics #467 (January)
- Squid in Detective Comics #497 (December)
- Wintergreen in New Teen Titans #2 (December)

=== Marvel Comics ===
- Anaconda in Marvel Two-in-One #64 (June)
- Sunset Bain in Machine Man #17 (October)
- Beep the Meep in Doctor Who Weekly #19 (Marvel UK)
- Bushman in Moon Knight #1 (November)
- Calypso in The Amazing Spider-Man #209 (October)
- Abslom Daak in Doctor Who Weekly #17 (Marvel UK)
- Dazzler in Uncanny X-Men #130
- Dragon Lord in Marvel Spotlight (vol. 2) #5 (March)
- Vanth Dreadstar in Epic Illustrated #1 (Spring)
- Fusion in The Amazing Spider-Man #208 (September)
- Caleb Hammer in Marvel Premiere #54 (June)
- Hellfire Club in Uncanny X-Men #129 (January)
  - Emma Frost in Uncanny X-Men #129 (January)
  - Harry Leland in Uncanny X-Men #132 (April)
  - Donald Pierce in Uncanny X-Men #132 (April)
  - Sage in Uncanny X-Men #132 (April)
  - Sebastian Shaw in Uncanny X-Men #129 (January)
- Imperial Guard members in Uncanny X-Men #137 (September)
  - Earthquake
  - Hussar
  - Manta
  - Warstar
- Karma in Marvel Team-Up #100 (December)
- Robert Kelly in Uncanny X-Men #135 (July)
- Dansen Macabre in Marvel Team-Up #93 (May)
- Mauler in Daredevil #167 (November)
- Mister Fear (Alan Fagan) in Marvel Team-Up #92 (April)
- Kitty Pryde in Uncanny X-Men #129
- Bernie Rosenthal in Captain America #248 (August)
- She-Hulk in Savage She-Hulk #1
- Margali Szardos in Uncanny X-Men Annual #4
- Taskmaster in Avengers #195 (May)
- U-Foes in The Incredible Hulk #254 (December)
- Vindicator in Uncanny X-Men #139 (November)

=== Independent titles ===
- Judge Anderson in 2000 AD #150 (Fleetway)
- Reid Fleming in Reid Fleming, World's Toughest Milkman (David Boswell)
- Evaristo, Argentinian police superintendent, by Carlos Sampayo and Francisco Solano Lopez in the Spanish magazine Superhumor.
