= Hans (comic book) =

Franco-Belgian comic book series

- This is the cover for Volume 1 of Hans, French edition. The cover depicts main characters Hans and Orchid.
- Created by: André-Paul Duchâteau; Grzegorz Rosiński; Zbigniew Kasprzak

Publication information
- Publisher: Le Lombard
- Original language: French
- Genre: Science fiction
- Publication date: 1980–2000

Reprints
- The series has been reprinted, at least in part, in Polish, German, and Italian.

Hans (Polish: Yans) is a science fiction Franco-Belgian comic with the story written by the Belgian writer André-Paul Duchâteau and drawn by Polish artists Grzegorz Rosiński and later by Zbigniew Kasprzak (Kas). It was published from 1980 to 2000 and has been collected in twelve volumes published in France by Le Lombard. It has also been translated into Polish, German, Italian, and Greek (the first six issues).

The primary motif of the series is the desire for freedom. The first books have an oppressive post-apocalyptic setting, while the later books move into a space opera setting; the shift in the tone is relevant to the end of the Cold War.

== Plot summary ==
The series tells the story of special agent Hans, caught up in a struggle for power in a totalitarian city, the only one left on Earth after a nuclear war. During his adventures, which include both space and time travel, Hans falls in love with Orchid, one of the outlaws who live in the ravaged areas around his home city. Eventually, Orchid gives birth to their daughter, Mahonia. With time, Hans becomes the ruler of the city and has to face numerous threats both within the city and outside it.

== Development ==
In 1976 young Polish comic book artist Grzegorz Rosiński met Belgian comic book writers Jean Van Hamme and André-Paul Duchâtea during an exhibition in Germany. The Belgians were impressed by Rosiński's art style and decided to work with him on some unspecified future project, tentatively "about Vikings", since Rosiński, because of the ongoing Cold War, did not want to work on any story set in the modern world. The Viking project would eventually materialize in the form of the Thorgal series, which debuted in 1977. In 1978, Duchâteau drafted a new, science-fiction themed story, and again asked Rosiński to work in it. The series debuted with La Tour du désespoir, a short story, in early August 1980 in the Franco-Belgian magazine Tintin. At first, Duchâteau was unsure if he wanted to develop Hans into a full-fledged series, and so in the internal chronology of the series, that first story is set an unspecified time after the events of Volume 1 (La Dernière Île, 1983); it is also often omitted from smaller reprint runs.

Hans also appeared in few other short stories. In 1986 a one page short story featuring Hans was published in French magazine Circus and another, two page short story was part of Tintin's 40th anniversary special edition (featuring Hans saving Tintin from a meteor strike). The series was at first published in comic book magazines (in Tintin until 1989, then in La Suisse and Hello Bédé), before being collected in larger volumes, of which twelve were eventually published. From Volume 7 (Les Enfants de l'infini, 1994) onward, the stories were not published elsewhere before appearing in book form. Duchâteau finished the work on the script for Volume 13, tentatively called Les Amazones, but its development was eventually cancelled due to publishers preferring other projects. As such, Volume 12 (Le Pays des abysses), published in 2000, marked the final volume of the series. The series has been republished in France by Le Lombard in twelve volumes.

In the late 1980s, Rosiński became increasingly busy working on the popular Thorgal series, and started looking for someone to take over Hans, eventually deciding on another Polish artist Zbigniew Kasprzak (pen name Kas), whose style, Rosiński felt, would be most true to his own. Kasprzak started working with Rosiński during Volume 5 (La Loi d'Ardélia), with Kasprzak focused on drawing the characters, and Rosiński on the backgrounds. Kasprzak took over from Volume 6 (La Planète aux sortilèges) onward, although some early editions incorrectly listed Rosiński as contributing to volumes 6, 7 and 8. From early 1990s, Kasprzak's wife Grażyna (pen name Graza) took over coloring of the series.

== Volumes ==
The series is composed of 12 volumes (not counting the first, the short story La Tour du désespoir).

- 0, La Tour du désespoir, August 1980. Story: André-Paul Duchâteau Art: Grzegorz Rosiński
- 1, La Dernière Île, (ISBN 2-8036-0427-2), June 1983. Story: André-Paul Duchâteau Art: Grzegorz Rosiński
- 2, Le Prisonnier de l'éternité, (ISBN 2-8036-0509-0), July 1985. Story: André-Paul Duchâteau Art: Grzegorz Rosiński
- 3, Les Mutants de Xanaïa, (ISBN 2-8036-0590-2), September 1986. Story: André-Paul Duchâteau Art: Grzegorz Rosiński
- 4, Les Gladiateurs, (ISBN 2-8036-0709-3), October 1988. Story: André-Paul Duchâteau Art: Grzegorz Rosiński
- 5, La Loi d'Ardélia, (ISBN 2-8036-0783-2), April 1990. Story: André-Paul Duchâteau Art: Grzegorz Rosiński, Kas
- 6, La Planète aux sortilèges, (ISBN 2-8036-1046-9), September 1993. Story: André-Paul Duchâteau Art: Kas
- 7, Les Enfants de l'infini, (ISBN 2-8036-1083-3), April 1994. Story: André-Paul Duchâteau Art: Kas Colors: Graza
- 8, Le Visage du monstre, (ISBN 2-8036-1152-X), February 1996. Story: André-Paul Duchâteau Art: Kas Colors: Graza
- 9, La Princesse d'Ultis, (ISBN 2-8036-1281-X), December 1997. Story: André-Paul Duchâteau Art: Kas Colors: Graza
- 10, Le Péril arc-en-ciel, (ISBN 2-8036-1350-6), October 1998. Story: André-Paul Duchâteau Art: Kas Colors: Graza
- 11, Le Secret du temps, (ISBN 2-8036-1415-4), November 1999. Story: André-Paul Duchâteau Art: Kas Colors: Graza
- 12, Le Pays des abysses, (ISBN 2-8036-1517-7), December 2000. Story: André-Paul Duchâteau Art: Kas Colors: Graza

The series has been translated to several languages, including Polish Italian and German. A number of collected editions have also been released; for example the Egmont Polska volumes compile the series in three books, each composed of four volumes.

== Reception ==
The series has received a number of reprints and translations. In 2001, Ksenia Chamerska, reviewing the series for the Polish magazine Świat Komiksu, praised Duchâteau for the novel ideas and surprising plot twists. Daniel Koziarski, reviewing the series in 2015 for the Polish portal Rebelya, commented that the quality of the series, impressive at first, declined near the end, which led to decline in sales and its eventual cancellation. Koziarski attributed it to poor writing by Duchâteau, which in later volumes he judged to be repetitive and illogical.

== Analysis ==
Duchâteau listed Brave New World and Alice in the Wonderland as inspirations, and described the motifs of the series as primarily praise of escaping to freedom and democracy, and secondarily a critique of tyranny. Adventure and love were also important aspects. He also considered that his troubled childhood, and the oppressive figure of his father, might be represented in some of the antagonists found in the series. Duchâteau also noted that Hans was inspired by Rosiński himself, and the dystopian theme of the struggle against the brutal, totalitarian ruler of the city was a nod towards the reality of the Cold War (Rosiński and Kasprzak lived in the communist People's Republic of Poland). The end of the communist regime in Poland in 1989 is represented by the shift in the tone of the series. The first books have an oppressive post-apocalyptic setting, while the latter move into a space opera setting; they also become less focused on Hans and more on other members of his growing family. Duchâteau also noted that the series allowed him to be more creative than the realistic Ric Hochet series he worked on concurrently.

Duchâteau chose the German name Hans for the character, as he wanted a simple, recognizable name, and decided to settle on the one known through the Hansel and Gretel fairy tale. When the series was published in Poland in the 1980s, the publisher decided to change the protagonist's name and the title to Yans, as the German name was unpopular in Poland, due to the long history of troubled Polish-German relations, and particularly the recent memory of World War II. Early Polish editions used the Polish version of Hans (Jan) instead of Yans before settling on the latter.
