= Thorgal: Curse of Atlantis =

2002 video game

- Developer: Cryo Interactive
- Publisher: Le Lombard
- Platform: Windows
- Release: FRA: September 20, 2002; NA: May 21, 2003; UK: June 13, 2003
- Genre: Point-and-click adventure
- Mode: Single-player

Thorgal: Curse of Atlantis, known in Europe as Thorgal: Odin's Curse (French: Thorgal: La Malédiction d'Odin), is a point-and-click adventure game developed by Cryo Interactive Entertainment and published by Le Lombard in 2002.

== Gameplay ==
The player assumes the role of Thorgal, a mighty Viking warrior and descendant of Atlantis, who uncovers a magical artifact which allows him to see his own future. Caught between reality and a prophetic vision, Thorgal discovers a foretold future where his son dies. Thorgal sets out to change the future life for his son.

Thorgal is a comic book character created by Jean Van Hamme and Grzegorz Rosiński and published by Belgian publisher Le Lombard.

== Reception ==
According to Lorraine Lue of DreamCatcher Interactive Europe, Thorgal was commercially unsuccessful, particularly in North America. She traced this problem to its visuals and its inclusion of action elements, which she believed had alienated DreamCatcher's audience.
