= Chantal De Spiegeleer =

Belgian comic book author (1957–2025)

- Born: 15 April 1957; Léopoldville, Belgian Congo
- Died: 15 February 2025 (aged 67); Cananéia, São Paulo, Brazil
- Education: Institut Saint-Luc
- Occupations: Comic book author, artist

Chantal De Spiegeleer (15 April 1957 – 15 February 2025) was a Belgian comic book author and artist.

== Life and career ==
Born in Léopoldville on 15 April 1957, De Spiegeleer attended the Institut Saint-Luc in Brussels. There, she joined Atelier R, founded by Claude Renard, where she published her first pages. She then published a short story titled Façades blanches in À Suivre magazine in 1978.

In the 1970s, De Spiegeleer started a career in fashion, modeling for Cacharel, Daniel Hechter, Armani, and Chanel. In 1980, she met René Sterne, whom she married and was a colorist for the Adler series with. She also designed a cutout of Coco Chanel looking out at a UFO.

In 1987, De Spiegeleer made her debut with Tintin magazine, designing panels for Super Tintin. She then designed a protagonist modeled after Louise Brooks in the series Madila. The volumes were published in Hello Bédé, as well as Le Lombard in 2008 and 2009.

De Spiegeleer and her husband settled on Union Island in Saint Vincent and the Grenadines in 1992. She then devoted herself to virtual painting, video games, and fabric design. She also collaborated on two collective albums devoted to children's rights and women's rights. She also finished the book The Curse of the Thirty Denarii in 2009, which had been started by her husband prior to his death in 2006.

Chantal De Spiegeleer died in Cananéia on 15 February 2025, at the age of 67.

== Publications ==
=== As author ===
- Mirabelle (1982)
- Madila
  - Madila Bay (1988)
  - Rouge Rubis (1989)
  - Octavie (1992)
  - Zelda et moi (1995)
  - Intégrale Madila (2008)
- The Curse of the Thirty Denarii (2009)

=== As artist ===
- L'Avion du Nanga (1987)
- Le Repaire du Katana (1988)
- Muerte transit (1989)
- Dernière Mission (1992)
- Black Bounty (1995)
- L'Île perdue (1996)
- La Jungle rouge (1997)
- Les Maudits (1998)
- La Force (2000)
- Le Goulag (2003)
- Adler: Intégrale 1 (2008)
- Adler: Intégrale 2 (2008)

=== Collective works ===
- Los derechos del niño (with Alain Bignon and René Sterne, 1991)
- Los derechos de la mujer (with Annie Goetzinger and Cinzia Ghigliano, 1992)

=== Art books ===
- 80 chats pour Tania, 10 ans pour Pepperland (1980)
- Fax to fax (1996)

=== Public collections ===
- Belgian Comic Strip Center, Brussels
