= Le Lombard =

Belgian comic book publisher

- Parent company: Média-Participations (1986–present)
- Founded: 1946; 80 years ago
- Founder: Raymond Leblanc; André Sinave
- Country of origin: Belgium
- Headquarters location: Belgium
- Distribution: Belgium, France, Netherlands, Switzerland, Canada
- Fiction genres: Comic albums and magazines
- Official website: www.lelombard.com

Le Lombard (French: [lə lɔ̃baʁ]), known as Les Éditions du Lombard ([lez‿edisjɔ̃ dy lɔ̃baʁ]) until 1989, is a Belgian comic book publisher established in 1946 when Tintin magazine was launched. Le Lombard became part of Média-Participations since 1986, alongside publishers Dargaud and Dupuis, with each entity maintaining its editorial independence.

== History ==
Les Éditions du Lombard was established by Raymond Leblanc and his partners on September 26, 1946. Wanting to create an illustrated youth magazine, they decided that the already well-known Tintin would be the perfect hero. Business partner André Sinave went to see Tintin creator Hergé to propose creating the magazine. Hergé, who had worked for Le Soir during the war, was being prosecuted for having collaborated with the Germans and did not have a publisher at the time. After consulting with his friend Edgar Pierre Jacobs, Hergé agreed. The first issue of Tintin magazine was published on 26 September 1946. Simultaneously, a Dutch version was also published, entitled Kuifje (Kuifje being the name of Tintin in Dutch). 40,000 copies were printed in French, and 20,000 in Dutch.

In 1986, Le Lombard was acquired by Média-Participations, and today publishes around one hundred titles annually. More recently, in 2015, Le Lombard joined with twelve other European comics publishing actors to create Europe Comics, a digital initiative co-funded by the European Commission's Creative Europe program.

== Notable titles ==
=== Comics series ===
This is a selected list of comics series, ordered by year of first publication by Le Lombard, with main authors given. A few series were also continued or temporarily taken over by other artists and writers.

- 1946: Tintin magazine
- 1946: Blake and Mortimer by Edgar P. Jacobs
- 1946: Corentin by Paul Cuvelier
- 1953: Chick Bill by Tibet
- 1954: Chlorophylle by Raymond Macherot
- 1955: Ric Hochet by Tibet and André-Paul Duchâteau
- 1955: Modeste et Pompon by André Franquin
- 1956: Barelli by Bob de Moor
- 1957: Dan Cooper by Albert Weinberg
- 1958: Oumpah-pah by Albert Uderzo and René Goscinny
- 1959: Clifton by Raymond Macherot
- 1959: Michel Vaillant by Jean Graton
- 1959: Redbeard by Jean-Michel Charlier and Victor Hubinon
- 1959: Bob Morane by Henri Vernes and Dino Attanasio
- 1961: Tanguy et Laverdure by Jean-Michel Charlier and Albert Uderzo
- 1963: Blueberry by Jean-Michel Charlier and Jean Giraud
- 1966: Bernard Prince by Greg and Hermann Huppen
- 1966: Iznogoud by René Goscinny and Jean Tabary
- 1966: Achille Talon by Greg
- 1967: Luc Orient by Greg and Eddy Paape
- 1968: Cubitus by Dupa
- 1969: Bruno Brazil by Greg
- 1972: Buddy Longway by Derib
- 1975: Léonard by Philippe Liégeois and Bob de Groot
- 1976: Simon du Fleuve by Claude Auclair
- 1977: Thorgal by Jean Van Hamme and Grzegorz Rosiński
- 1980: Hans by André-Paul Duchâteau and Grzegorz Rosiński, Zbigniew Kasprzak
- 1985: Adler by René Sterne
- 1985: Alpha by Pascal Renard and Youri Jigounov
- From 1990: The Smurfs by Peyo
- From 1993: Benoît Brisefer by Peyo
- 1996: Odilon Verjus by Yann Le Pennetier and Laurent Verron
- 1997: L'Élève Ducobu by Zidrou and Godi
- 1999: IR$ by Stephen Desberg and Bernard Vrancken
- From 1999: Yakari by Job and Derib
- 2001: Western by Jean Van Hamme and Grzegorz Rosinski
- 2001: Lait entier by Stephen Desberg and Johan De Moor

=== Books ===
- 2010: Crusade by writer Jean Dufaux and artist Philippe Xavier. Published in Britain by Cinebook
- 2010: Angry Birds Stella
