= Chninkel =

Franco-Belgian comic book

- J'on, the main character of the comic and member of the chninkel race.
- Created by: Jean Van Hamme; Grzegorz Rosiński
- Original language: French
- Genre: Fantasy
- Publication date: 1986–1987

Reprints
- The series has been reprinted, at least in part, in Polish, German, Italian, Spanish, Finnish, Dutch, and English.

Chninkel or The Great Power of Chninkel (French: Le Grand Pouvoir du Chninkel) is a Franco-Belgian comic with the story written by the Belgian writer Jean Van Hamme and the art drawn by the Polish artist Grzegorz Rosiński. First published from 1986 to 1987 in black and white, and later republished in color and translated to several languages, it mixes the genres of fantasy, science fiction and Biblical parables. It follows the adventures of a diminutive humanoid J'on, who suddenly finds himself tasked with saving the world. It has been called one of the first graphic novels in the history of Franco-Belgian comics.

== Background ==
Jean Van Hamme and Grzegorz Rosiński previously collaborated on Thorgal, a fantasy comic that debuted in 1977. They would continue working on that series for many years, with occasional ventures into other projects. Chninkel was a novel, one-shot project that they saw as departing from the types of works common at that time in the Franco-belgian comic scene. The project was initiated by Rosiński, who wanted to produce a work in black and white, instead of the usual color. Van Hamme agreed and initially wrote it as a fantasy story, which later gained a more unique character when he decided to mix in references to Christianity.

== Publication history ==
The series debuted in October 1986 in the À Suivre magazine published by Casterman. It was first published in French in black and white in an episodic form, then collected and published in an album form in 1988, with a color edition in 2001. The complete edition consists of ten chapters and 134 plates. The comic was initially intended to be black and white, and for that purpose Rosiński utilized a number of techniques specific to that style. It was later colored by Polish colorist Graza.

The graphic novel has been translated to several languages, including Polish (as Szninkiel, with several editions since 1988), German (as Die große Macht des kleinen Schninkel), Spanish (as El gran poder del Chninkel), Italian (as Il grande potere del Chninkel), Dutch (as De Chninkel) and Finnish (as Chninkel ja suuri voima). An English translation was published from 1991 to 1993 in the anthology series Cheval Noir (as The Great Power of the Chninkel).

Cover of Le Grand pouvoir du Chninkel, French 2008 CASTERMAN edition

Given the commercial success of the series, the publisher had considered plans for a sequel and van Hamme had some preliminary ideas, but ultimately the authors refused, so the only new publication was the release of the color edition.

== Plot summary ==
Chninkel's story is set on the planet Daar orbiting a double sun, where there is a constant war between three immortal beings: Jargot the Fragrant, Zembria the Cyclops and Barr-Find the Black Hand. The main character is J'on, a chninkel (a race of midget humanoids), raised as a slave of Barr-Finda. J'on survives one of the bloody battles, and in the ensuing chaos is left on the battlefield among the casualties, gaining his freedom. Unexpectedly, a black monolith appears in front of him, and declares itself to be the supreme god U’n. It orders J'on to bring peace to the world. This fits with a chninkel legend according to which a chninkel chosen by U'n will one day restore peace on Daara. J’on would prefer to live his days in peace, and with his love interest G'wel, but is thrust into escalating events beyond his control, and eventually brings peace to the world, by uniting the immortal beings against himself. For that, he pays the highest price: death by public execution (he is chained to a monolith and shot at with arrows). In the end, an angered O'n brings an apocalyptic rain of fire that destroys almost all life on the planet, including the chninkels, and is presumed to abandon the survivors (a race resembling apes) to their fate; the latter eventually reclaim the recovering world, but in turn forget about O'n and the world before, although the monolith of U'n remains on the surface of the planet and is worshipped by the apes.

== Reception and analysis ==
The comic has been described one of the first graphic novels in the history of Franco-Belgian comics, and as mixing the genres of fantasy, science fiction and Biblical parables. The work draws inspirations and has numerous references to other works, from Tolkien's Middle-earth and Clarke's and Kubrick's Space Odyssey to the Bible. Less obvious references have been identified to, among others, The Dark Crystal, Conan the Barbarian, Elric of Melniboné, and various elements of Norse mythology.

In 2002 Gwael Bernicot described it as a "very contemporary and disillusioned reinterpretation of the religious phenomenon", a "disenchanted Gospel". Parallels have been drawn between the main character, J'on, and Jesus, while his diminutive design resembles Bilbo the hobbit. In 2020, Cédric Pietralunga, writing for Le Monde called the book Rosiński's masterpiece, describing it as a "a disenchanted version of the New Testament with Tolkien sauce". Van Hamme himself described the story as Tolkien-inspired "offbeat version of the New Testament". He also discussed his "theological marketing" idea, related to the concept of the saviour: primitive societies worship God, but then turn away from him. God punishes them with a disaster, then sends a Savior, who will ensure the reformed religion will be kept in check by he fear of punishment, absent in the original belief they turned away from. As for the most obvious Space Odyssey reference, the God in the series is portrayed by the Monolith, and the end of the comic references the beginning of the movie.

A 1989 review in The Comics Journal concluded that "here is the Thorgal team on a great story: elves, Amazons, dwarves, allegory, religion, and philosophy. Entertaining, too!". In 2005, Wojciech Obremski, in his monograph on the history of Polish comics, concluded that the complex story of Chninkel, mixing numerous cultural references, results in a product that should satisfy most demanding readers.

In 1989, the comic was reviewed by Marek Oramus for Nowa Fantastyka. While noting that he is not a fan of comic books, he positively described the title as "a significant achievement of the genre." Oramus praised the comic book as "excellently drawn" and for a valuable script that presents unusual action twists as well as "important observations about human nature" and "the eternal struggle between good and evil." Oramus considered the comic's most valuable message to be that "each of us is the chosen one", with power to change the world. Oramus however criticized the ending for "unbearable naivety and simplification" (specifically, criticizing the existence of two suns in the context of suggesting that the world is a prehistoric Earth; and that after the explosion of one of them, life survived on the planet), as well as unnecessary or unexplained and ostentatious references to Christian mythology, Kubrick's Odyssey and works of Tolkien.

Ksenia Chamerska, in a preface to the 2020 Polish edition of the graphic novel, which she translated, pointed out that the "god" of Chninkel, appearing in the form of a black monolith, bears an uncanny resemblance to the artifact from Clarke's Space Odyssey. With regards to Tolkien's influence, she compares the midget humanoid race of chninkels to hobbits, and his quest to that of Frodo's. She also observed that Chninkel is an "important phase in the history of European comics". She praises the work for a deeply philosophical story open to numerous interpretations, plot twists, subtle jokes, and beautiful and occasionally erotic art, concluding that the work is a masterpiece of its genre.

Also in 2020, the original cover artwork for the series sold at an auction for 186,760 euros.

In 2022, a reviewer for the Spanish website Zona Negativa praised the comic as a "very solid piece of work in which a coherent and archetypal fantasy, full of references and tributes, merges with a satirical and skeptical treatment, both of the characters and of the very essence of fantasy".

== Awards ==
- 1989: Angoulême International Comics Festival Prize Awarded by the Audience
