= Adler (comics) =

Belgian comic series (1987–2003)

- Cover of Adler: Intégrale 1
- Story: René Sterne
- Ink: René Sterne
- Date: 1985–2003
- Hero: Adler von Berg
- Pages: 46 pages per album

Adler is a Belgian comic series written and drawn by the Belgian author René Sterne (1952–2006) and colored by his wife Chantal De Spiegeleer.

The comic was initially serialized in Tintin magazine beginning in 1985 and was published as ten albums by Le Lombard, from 1987 to 2003. It was reissued in 2008 in two omnibus volumes collecting five albums each.

Executed in classic ligne claire, the series's drawings are characterized by a stylized but realistic portrayal of the background and a highly stylized, nearly caricatural character design. Adler is named after the protagonist, Adler von Berg, a German pilot who deserts the Luftwaffe in 1942 and founds an airfreight company in Delhi with his Irish girlfriend Helen. The albums recount, with a humorous tone, their action-laden adventures in exotic locations such as India, Latin America, the Caribbean or a Soviet gulag.

== Albums ==
Individual albums

1. L'avion du Nanga (1987, ISBN 2-8036-0648-8)
2. Le repaire du Katana (1988, ISBN 2-8036-0673-9)
3. Muerte transit (1989, ISBN 2-8036-0764-6)
4. Dernière mission (1992, ISBN 2-8036-0851-0)
5. Black Bounty (1995, ISBN 2-8036-1157-0)
6. L'île perdue (1996, ISBN 2-8036-1208-9)
7. La jungle rouge (1997, ISBN 2-8036-1267-4)
8. Les maudits (1998, ISBN 2-8036-1354-9)
9. La force (2000, ISBN 2-80361-493-6)
10. Le goulag (2003, ISBN 2-8036-1807-9)

Collections

1. Adler: Intégrale 1 (2008, ISBN 978-2-8036-2398-3)
2. Adler: Intégrale 2 (2008, ISBN 978-2-8036-2460-7)

Special editions

- Noël en malaisie (1998, hors-série, 500 copies published by B.D. Club de Genève)
