= Greg (cartoonist) =

Belgian comic artist (1931–1999)

- Greg in 1988
- Born: Michel Régnier; 5 May 1931 Ixelles, Belgium
- Died: 29 October 1999 (aged 68) Neuilly-sur-Seine, France
- Areas: artist, writer
- Pseudonym: Louis Albert
- Notable works: Luc Orient; Bruno Brazil; Bernard Prince; Achille Talon; Rock Derby; Zig et Puce
- Awards: full list

Michel Régnier (5 May 1931 – 29 October 1999), best known by his pseudonym Greg, was a Belgian cartoonist best known for Achille Talon, and later became editor of Tintin magazine.

== Biography ==
Regnier was born in Ixelles, Belgium in 1931. His first series, Les Aventures de Nestor et Boniface, appeared in the Belgian magazine Vers l'Avenir when he was sixteen. He moved to the comic magazine Héroic Albums, going on to work for the Franco-Belgian comics magazine Spirou in 1954. In 1955 he launched his own magazine, Paddy, but eventually discontinued it.

The series for which Greg is best known, Achille Talon, began in 1963 in Pilote magazine, also the source of comics such as Asterix. This series, which he both wrote and illustrated, presents the comic misadventures of the eponymous mild-mannered polysyllabic bourgeois. In all 42 albums appeared, the first years with short gags, later with full-length (i.e. 44 pages) stories. The series was continued by Widenlocher after the death of Greg. An English translation titled Walter Melon was unsuccessful. In 1996, an animated series of 52 episodes of 26 minutes each was produced. This series was also shown in English as Walter Melon. Other series Greg provided artwork for in the early 60s were the boxing series Rock Derby and the revival of Alain Saint-Ogan's classic series Zig et Puce.

Regnier became editor-in-chief of Tintin magazine in 1966 and remained so until 1974. In this period, he moved the magazine away from the classic Ligne claire of Hergé and Edgar Pierre Jacobs, because the main authors published new stories less frequently, and because the magazine suffered from the success of new French magazines like Pilote. Greg introduced a more adult genre, with less perfect heroes and more violence. He created some of his most famous series like Bruno Brazil and Bernard Prince in this period, and introduced artists like Hermann to the magazine.

In 1975 he became literary director for the French publisher Dargaud and launched Achille Talon magazine. Having moved to Paris, he became a French citizen, and officially took a new name, Michel Greg. In the late 1970s he moved to the U.S. as a representative for Dargaud, working on several television projects and promoting European comics. He returned to France in the mid-1980s where he continued scripting comics and also wrote novels for the Hardy et Lesage collection of Fleuve Noir.

As "Greg", Regnier was one of the most prolific creators of Franco-Belgian comics, working in all genres and collaborating with many other European artists and scriptwriters. Well known for working with artist Hermann, Greg also worked with André Franquin, Eddy Paape (the science fiction series Luc Orient), Dany, Albert Uderzo and René Goscinny, and many others. It is estimated that he contributed as a writer and an artist to some 250 comic albums.

Hergé asked him to remake two of The Adventures of Tintin – The Seven Crystal Balls and Prisoners of the Sun – into a script for one long animated movie, Tintin and the Temple of the Sun. He also wrote the script for Tintin and the Lake of Sharks. Greg was asked to write two stories for the Tintin comics as well, including Le Thermozéro, but in the end Hergé, wanting to keep all creative control, did not use them.

Michel Regnier died in 1999 in Paris, France.

== Bibliography ==
Only those series for which albums have appeared are mentioned here. Furthermore, Greg has made many series in the 1950s, especially in La Libre Belgique, of which no albums have appeared. Titles are ordered by the first year in which an album appeared, not the first year the comic appeared in a magazine or newspaper.

| Series | Years | Volumes | Artwork | Editor | Remarks |
|---|---|---|---|---|---|
| Chick Bill | 1957–1968 | 19 | Tibet | Le Lombard and Dargaud | Most of his work on this series is uncredited |
| Modeste et Pompon | 1958–1973 | 3 | André Franquin | Le Lombard and Dargaud | Other gags written by René Goscinny and Franquin etc. |
| Spirou et Fantasio | 1960–1974 | 6 | André Franquin | Dupuis | Additional stories by Jidéhem and Jean Roba |
| Corentin | 1963 | 1 | Paul Cuvelier | Le Lombard and Dargaud | |
| Flamme d'argent | 1965–1968 | 2 | Paul Cuvelier | Le Lombard and Dargaud | |
| Zig et Puce | 1965–1995 | 6 | Greg | Le Lombard, Dargaud, and Glénat | Reprise of the classic series by Alain Saint-Ogan |
| Line | 1966–1979 | 4 | Paul Cuvelier | Le Lombard, Dargaud, and Bédéscope | |
| Achille Talon | 1966–1996 | 42 | Greg | Dargaud | |
| Bernard Prince | 1969–1992 | 17 | Hermann, Dany, and Edouard Aidans | Le Lombard, Dargaud, and Blanco | |
| Luc Orient | 1969–1994 | 18 | Eddy Paape | Le Lombard and Dargaud | |
| Bruno Brazil | 1969–1995 | 11 | William Vance | Le Lombard and Dargaud | |
| Clifton | 1969–1971 | 3 | Jo-El Azara and Turk | Le Lombard and Dargaud | Additional storywriting by Bob de Groot |
| Olivier Rameau | 1970–1987 | 11 | Dany | Le Lombard and Dargaud | |
| Comanche | 1972–1998 | 15 | Hermann and Rouge | Le Lombard, Dargaud, and Strip Art | |
| Alice au pays des merveilles | 1973 | 1 | Dupa, Dany, Turk and De Groot | Le Lombard and Dargaud | Adaptation of Alice in Wonderland |
| The Adventures of Tintin | 1973 | 1 | Animation stills | Casterman | An adaptation of a script for an animated movie, written by Greg |
| Chlorophylle | 1973–1974 | 2 | Dupa | Le Lombard and Dargaud | |
| Constant Souci et le mystère de l'homme aux trèfles | 1974 | 1 | Greg | Glénat | |
| Tommy Banco | 1974 | 1 | Eddy Paape | Le Lombard and Dargaud | |
| Les Panthères | 1974–1975 | 3 | Edouard Aidans | Le Lombard and Dargaud | |
| Rock Derby | 1974–1980 | 7 | Greg | Le Lombard, Dargaud and Magic-Strip | |
| Les naufragés d'Arroyoka | 1975 | 1 | Claude Auclair | Le Lombard and Dargaud | |
| Jo Nuage et Kay McCloud | 1976 | 1 | Dany | Dargaud | |
| Cobalt | 1976–1981 | 2 | Fahrer | Le Lombard and Dargaud | |
| Frère Boudin | 1977–1978 | 2 | Claude Marin | Dargaud | |
| Les As | 1978–1986 | 16 | Studio Greg | Dargaud | The only series officially credited to Studio Greg |
| Go West | 1979 | 1 | Derib | Dargaud | |
| Domino | 1979 | 1 | Chéret | Le Lombard and Dargaud | |
| Les Bolides d'argent | 1981 | 1 | Mitteï | Bédésup | |
| Spaghetti | 1982 | 1 | Dino Attanasio | Dargaud | |
| Mouminet et Alphonse | 1984 | 1 | Tibet | Magic-Strip | |
| Babiole et Zou | 1985 | 1 | Greg | Le Lombard | Created in 1962 |
| Le club des Peur-de-Rien | 1985–1986 | 2 | Tibet | Le Lombard and Dargaud | |
| Papa Talon | 1988 | 1 | Hachel | MC Productions | A spin-off from Achille Talon |
| Colby | 1991–1997 | 3 | Michel Blanc-Dumont | Dargaud | |
| Johnny Congo | 1992–1993 | 2 | Eddy Paape | Claude Lefrancq | |

== Awards ==
- 1985: Haxtur Award, Spain, Best Long Comic Strip for Spirou et Fantasio: QRN sur Bretzelburg, artist: André Franquin

== Sources ==
- Béra, Michel; Mellot, Philippe (1998). Trésors de la bande dessinée 1999-2000. Paris: Les éditions de l'amateur Ed. de l'amateur. ISBN 2859172580.
- Greg publications in Spirou, Belgian Tintin, French Tintin, Vaillant and Pif and Pilote BDoubliées (in French)

Footnotes
