= Bruno Brazil =

Franco-Belgian comics series by Greg under the pseudonym Louis Albert

- Cover of the first album, Le requin qui mourut deux fois (1969)
- Author(s): Greg, Laurent-Frédéric Bollée
- Illustrator(s): William Vance, Philippe Aymond
- Current status/schedule: Running
- Launch date: 1969
- Publisher(s): Dargaud, Le Lombard
- Genre(s): Adventure

Bruno Brazil is a Franco-Belgian comics series written by Greg, under the pseudonym Louis Albert, and drawn by William Vance. It was initially serialised in the Franco-Belgian comics magazine Tintin, first appearing on January 17, 1967. The first album publication was in 1969, while the latest album was first published in 1995. While Dargaud had initially published the series up to the penultimate volume, the rights were eventually passed on to Le Lombard, which is part of the same holding company, Média-Participations, and the final volume was published under its banner. As of today, the series is yet to be published in English but is available in various other languages, including French and Spanish.

== Synopsis ==
The comic series is about a secret agent named Bruno Brazil, who heads a small special unit of the US Secret Service. In later volumes, this secret service is called the WSIO (World Security International Organization).

Bruno's special unit is known by the code name "Commando Cayman" and each of the six members of the command possesses a special ability. Until volume four, Rebelle is the criminal mastermind behind fantastic inventions as an eternal enemy. Thereafter she disappears from the scene and the stories become more realistic, with Commando Cayman that has to fight the mafia.

The series is notable for not avoiding casualties among the Cayman Command.

== Characters ==
Bruno Brazil, the main character of the series

- Bruno Brazil, the main protagonist. An experienced spy-warrior
- Gaucho Morales, a skillful gangster. A member of the team due to his talents and contacts.
- Whip Rafale, a previous circus artist, and expert with a whip.
- Texas Bronco, a former rodeo cowboy, strong as an ox.
- Billy Brazil, Bruno Brazil's younger brother. Fresh out of military academy.
- Lafayette called "Big Boy", a cunning former jockey.
- Tony Nomade called "Le Nomade", a replacement after the disappearance of Big Boy.
- Le Colonel L, commander of the elite unit.

== Albums ==
=== Regular series ===
- 1. Le requin qui mourut deux fois, 1969, Dargaud
- 3. Les yeux sans visage, 1971, Dargaud
- 4. La cité pétrifiée, 1972, Dargaud
- 5. La nuit des chacals, 1973, Dargaud
- 6. Sarabande à Sacramento, 1974, Dargaud
- 7. Des caïmans dans la rizière, 1975, Dargaud
- 8. Orage aux Aléoutiennes, 1976, Dargaud
- 9. Quitte ou double pour Alak 6, 1977, Dargaud
- 10. Dossier Bruno Brazil, 1977, Dargaud
- 11. La fin...!??, 1995, Le Lombard

=== The new adventures of Bruno Brazil ===
- 1. Black Program 1, 2019, Le Lombard
- 2. Black Program 2, 2020, Le Lombard
- 3. Terreur boréale à Eskimo Point, 2022, Le Lombard

== Sources ==
- Bruno Brazil publications in Belgian Tintin Archived 2007-10-15 at the Wayback Machine and French Tintin BDoubliées (in French)
- Bruno Brazil albums Bedetheque (in French)
