= Bernard Prince =

Belgian comic series

- 1969 cover of the first album, General Satan
- Illustrator(s): Hermann Huppen, Dany, Edouard Aidans
- Current status/schedule: Discontinued
- Launch date: 1966
- End date: 2010
- Syndicate(s): Le Lombard, Uitgeverij Blanco, Uitgeverij Helmond
- Genre(s): Adventure comics

Bernard Prince is a Belgian comics series, featuring an eponymous character and his sailor-adventurer companions. The series was created by Belgian cartoonists Greg and Hermann for the comics magazine Tintin, first appearing on January 4, 1966.

== Synopsis ==
Originally an agent of Interpol the heroic Prince, joined by the roguish Barney Jordan and the clever orphan Djinn, becomes an adventurer sailing through the contemporary (1960s-70s) world on a sloop, the beautiful Cormoran.

== Bibliography ==
1. General Satan, story by Greg, illustrations by Hermann
2. Storm over Coronado, Greg/Hermann
3. The Hell of Suong-Bay, Greg/Hermann
4. Manhattan Adventure, Greg/Hermann (remake illustrated by Edouard Aidans)
5. Fire in the Oasis, Greg/Hermann
6. The Law of the Hurricane, Greg/Hermann
7. The Scorched Land, Greg/Hermann
8. The Green Flame of the Conquistador, Greg/Hermann
9. Guerillas for a Ghost, Greg/Hermann
10. The Hot Breath of Moloch, Greg/Hermann
11. Fortress of Fog, Greg/Hermann
12. Target: Cormoran, Greg/Hermann
13. Port of Madness, Greg/Hermann
14. The Trap of 100,000 Spears, Greg/Dany
15. The Cormoran Returns, Greg/Dany (includes "Farewell, Queen!" (Adieu, la reine!), "Everyone's taste" (Chacun son goût), "The return of Cormoran" (Le retour du Cormoran))
16. Miss Dynamite, Greg/Aidans
17. Green Poison, Greg/Aidans
18. Danger on the River, Yves H./Hermann

== Sources ==
- Bernard Prince publications in Belgian Tintin Archived 2011-01-09 at the Wayback Machine and French Tintin Archived 2011-01-27 at the Wayback Machine BDoubliées (in French)
- Bernard Prince albums Bedetheque (in French)
