= Barelli =

Franco-Belgian comics series by Bob de Moor

- Author: Bob de Moor
- Current status/schedule: Discontinued
- Launch date: 1956
- End date: 1989
- Syndicate(s): Le Lombard
- Genre: Adventure comics

Barelli is a comics series featuring an eponymous character, created by Bob de Moor, which first appeared in the Franco-Belgian comics magazine Tintin on 27 July 1950. Barelli made sporadic serial runs throughout the 1950s, 1960s and 1970s while 8 albums in the series were released by Lombard and Bédescope.

== Synopsis ==
Barelli is a theatre actor who often finds himself caught up in dangerous adventures.

== Characters ==
The main character, Georges Barelli

- Georges Barelli, a native of Yugoslavia with an Italian name, is a stage actor who achieved international stardom playing Antonio in William Shakespeare's The Merchant of Venice.
- Inspector Moreau, from the Judicial Police in Paris.
- Journalist Randor, a friend of Georges Barelli.
- Anne Nannah, an actress and friend of the actor with whom she is discreetly infatuated.
- Sophia Barelli, Georges' aunt or "Georgio".
- Vittorio Barelli, Georges' uncle and Sophia's brother.

== Bibliography ==
=== Serialised stories ===
1. L'enigmatique monsieur Barelli (Tintin, 30/1950 - 9/1951)
2. Barelli a nusa penida (Tintin, 10/1951 - 20/1952. Later Bob de Moor added pages to this adventure)
3. Barelli et les agents secrets (Tintin, 1964)
4. Barelli et le Bouddha boudant (Tintin, 1972)
5. Bonne mine à la mer (Tintin, 1974)
6. Barelli et le seigneur de Gonobutz (Tintin, 1976)
7. Barelli et la mort de Richard II (1980)

=== Album publications ===
1. L'énigmatique Mr Barelli (1956) Lombard
2. Barelli et les agents secrets (1973), Lombard
3. Barelli et le bouddha boudant (1974), Lombard
4. Bonne mine à la mer (1975), Lombard
5. Barelli à Nusa Penida T1 (1980), Bédescope
6. Barelli à Nusa Penida T2 (1980), Bédescope
7. Le Seigneur de Gonobutz (1980), Bedescope
8. Barelli et la mort de Richard II (1980), Bedescope
- Bruxelles Bouillonne (1989) Promotional comic book for the city of Brussels.

== See also ==
• Ligne claire

== Sources ==
- Barelli publications in Belgian Tintin and French Tintin BDoubliées (in French)
- Barelli albums Bedetheque (in French)
