= Luc Orient =

Belgian comic strip (1967–1994)

- Main character with the series logo
- Author(s): Greg, Eddy Paape
- Current status/schedule: Discontinued
- Launch date: 1967
- End date: 1994
- Publisher(s): Le Lombard, Dargaud
- Genre(s): Science fiction

Luc Orient is a Belgian science fiction comic series featuring an eponymous hero, created in 1967 by the writer Greg and the artist Eddy Paape. It belongs to the large family of Franco-Belgian comics.

== Publishing history ==
Luc Orient was originally serialized in the weekly Tintin magazine starting on January 17, 1967. It was one of the several series simultaneously launched by then-editor Greg to give the magazine a needed facelift. Luc Orient's adventures were then collected as a series of graphic novels by Éditions du Lombard, starting in 1969.

The series continued regularly with one or two volumes per year until episode 13, L'enclume de la foudre was released in 1978. After Tintin ceased publication in 1978 (following several name changes), the later episodes were released sporadically. The series was to be reprinted in an omnibus edition, two volumes in one, by Pictoris Studio, under the title L'intégrale de Luc Orient; but only three tomes (i.e. the first six volumes) ever appeared, between 1998 and 1999.

== Synopsis ==
Luc Orient, professor Hugo Kala from Eurocristal laboratory and his secretary Lora, share several adventures involving aliens and scientific mysteries. At the beginning, the trio discovers a stranded spaceship with a hibernating alien crew; professor Kala's arrival brings hope to the refugees from the planet Terango (Episodes 1-2). They then travel to Terango to thwart the evil tyrant Sectan who plots to invade Earth (Episodes 3-5). Subsequent adventures involve a series of scientific mysteries. Luc and Lora even acquire temporary superpowers in Episode 6.

== Bibliography ==
Stories were originally published in several magazines, including Tintin, Tintin Hebdo and Nouveau Tintin. Following is the list of stories:

1. Le Dragon de Feu (The Dragon of Fire) (French Tintin Nos. 952-970, 1967)
2. Les Soleils de Glace (The Suns of Ice) (TI Nos. 976-997, 1967)
3. Le Maître de Terango (The Master of Terango) (TI Nos. 1009-1029, 1968)
4. La Planète de l'Angoisse (The Planet of Terror) (TI Nos. 1040-1059, 1968–69)
5. La Forêt d'Acier (The Forest of Steel) (TI Nos. 1082-1102, 1969)
6. Le Secret des 7 Lumières (The Secret of the 7 Lights) (TI Nos. 1118-1138, 1970)
7. Le Cratère aux Sortilèges (The Crater of Spells) (TI Nos. 1183-1196, 1971)
8. La Légion des Anges Maudits (The Legion of the Fallen Angels) (TI Nos. 1206-1221, 1971-72)
9. 24 Heures pour la Planète Terre (24 Hours for Planet Earth) (TI No.1258-TH No. 10, 1972-73)
10. Le 6ème Continent (The Sixth Continent) (TH Nos. 53-60, 1974)
11. La Vallée des Eaux Troubles (The Valley of Murky Waters) (TH Nos. 83-98, 1974)
12. La Porte de Cristal (The Crystal Gate) (NT Nos. 10-25, 1975-76)
13. L'Enclume de la Foudre (The Anvil of Thunder) (NT Nos. 96-107, 1977)
14. Le Rivage de la Fureur (The Shores of Wrath) (1981)
15. Roubak, Ultime Espoir (Rubak: Ultimate Hope) (1984)
16. Caragal (1985)
17. Les Spores de Nulle Part (The Spores from Nowhere) ("Tintin Pocket" 1970; collected 1990)
18. Rendez-Vous à 20 Heures en Enfer (Rendezvous at 20:00 in Hell) (1994)

== Sources ==
- Luc Orient publications in Belgian TinTin and French Tintin BDoubliées (in French)
- Luc Orient albums Bedetheque (in French)

Footnotes
