= Anna Brandoli =

Italian comic book artist

- Born: July 25, 1945 (age 81) Milan, Italy
- Area: Artist
- Notable works: La Strega; Cuba 42

I Testamenti di Sant'Ambrogio, cover of a French edition

Anna Brandoli (born 25 July 1945) is an Italian female comic book artist.

== Early life ==
Anna Brandoli was born in Milan, Italy on July 25, 1945, as World War II was coming to an end. At age fourteen, Brandoli started working in a ceramic warehouse and attended an evening school known as Scuola del Castello. She attended an evening school as an alternative so that she could work during the day. Brandoli studied advertisement graphics at Scuola del Castello while she tried a number of jobs on the side. Eventually, Brandoli settled in the Knorr internal office, where she illustrated brochures for sellers. After advertising, she turned to comic making and eventually collaborates with scenarist Renato Queirolo. They worked together to make comics that took inspiration from researched historical settings and imagination combined to create stories of adventure. Brandoli illustrations included different topics in their comics such as symbolism of power and protagonists that overlap with ideals of the feminist movement.

== Biography ==
Born in Milan, Brandoli made her debut in 1977 in Alter Alter magazine. For that magazine, she drew La Strega (The Witch) with Renato Queirolo, who became her main scenarist. This comic was translated in many languages including French (published by Glénat), Danish (published by Carlsen), and Swedish (published by Medusa). In Sweden it is called Rebecca, which was the name of the comic's heroine. Together, Brandoli and Queirolo also published two albums for a younger audience: Colorina and Il Mago di Oz (The Wizard of Oz).

In 1981, Brandoli started the I Testamenti di Sant'Ambrogio (Rebecca) series in the magazine Linus. This series narrates the adventures of a woman living in the 15th century Italy. The series was continued in Orient Express and Comic Art.

In 1988, she produced Alias for Isola Trovata, again with Queirolo.

She also started the Cuba 42 series with writer Ottavio De Angelis, set in the Second World War.
