= Simon du Fleuve =

- Cover of Le Clan des Centaures, the first issue in this series

Publication information
- Format: Graphic novel
- Genre: Post-apocalyptic
- Publication date: 1976-1978, 1988-1989
- No. of issues: 9

Creative team
- Written by: Claude Auclair

Simon du Fleuve is a post-apocalyptic French graphic novel series written by Claude Auclair, with five volumes published between 1976 and 1978, and a second cycle of four albums from 1988 to 1989. Simon du Fleuve started in the pages of Tintin magazine.

The heirs of Jean Giono have stated that elements of the story are stolen in Auclair's prequel of Simon du Fleuve named La balade de Cheveu-Rouge from Giono's Le chant du monde.

At least three albums have been published in English so far:

- Simon of the River 1 - Clan of Centaurs
- Simon of the River 2 - Slaves
- Simon of the River 3 - Mailis
