= Tibet (cartoonist) =

French cartoonist (1931–2010)

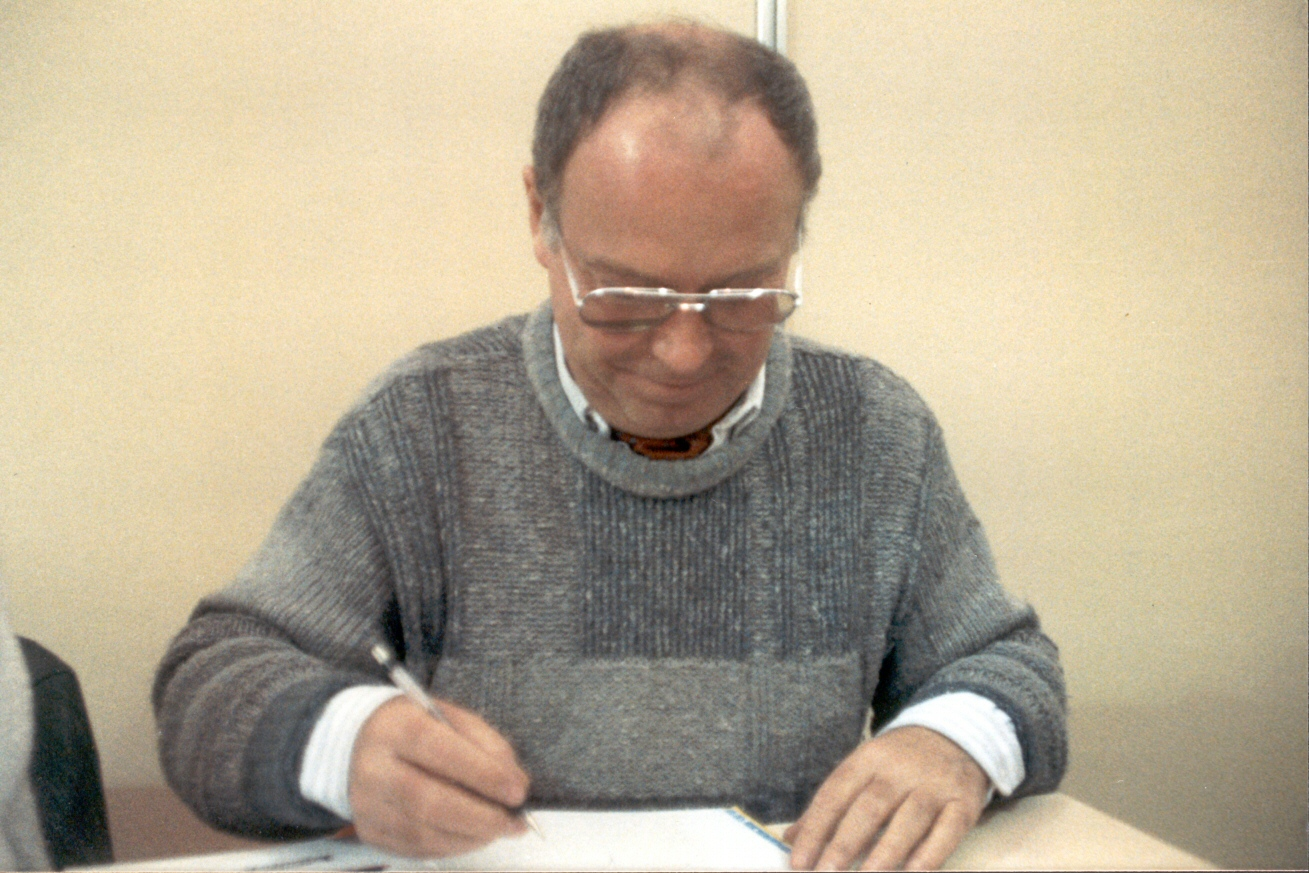
- Tibet at Angoulême, January 1989
- Born: Gilbert Gascard; 29 October 1931 Marseille, France
- Died: 3 January 2010 (aged 78) Roquebrune-sur-Argens, France
- Areas: Artist, writer
- Notable works: Tintin magazine Ric Hochet; Chick Bill

Gilbert Gascard ([gaskaʁ]; 29 October 1931 – 3 January 2010), known by the pseudonym Tibet (French: [tibɛ]), was a French cartoonist in the Franco-Belgian comics tradition. He is known for work produced for the Franco-Belgian comics magazine Tintin, most notably the long-running series Ric Hochet and Chick Bill.

== Bibliography ==
- Chick Bill, with scripts by Greg, André-Paul Duchâteau, René Goscinny, 71 albums published since 1954, Le Lombard
- Ric Hochet, with André-Paul Duchâteau (scenario), 76 albums published since 1963, Le Lombard
- Le Club des "Peur-de-Rien", with Greg, (scenario), 9 albums published since 1966, Le Lombard
- El Mocco le terrible, 1977, Chlorophylle
- Dave O'Flynn, 2 albums in 1979, Chlorophylle,
- Les aventures de Globul, with René Goscinny (scenario), 1984, Magic Strip
- Mouminet et Alphonse, with Greg (scenario), 1984, Magic Strip
- Aldo Rémy, 2 albums since 2006, Glénat
