= Chick Bill =

Belgian comic book series created by Tibet

Chick Bill is a Belgian humorous Western comic book series created by Tibet. It was first published in 1953 in the magazine Chez Nous Junior, and its Dutch language counterpart Ons Volkske, and began serial publication on October 19, 1955, in Tintin magazine under the title Les aventures de Chick Bill le cow-boy. 70 books of the series were published, and it lasted until Tibet's death in 2010. Tibet wrote many of the scripts as well as drawing all the episodes, but various stories were written by André-Paul Duchâteau and Greg and one episode was scripted by René Goscinny. Frank Brichau was credited as co-illustrator for the last two books.

The series follows the adventures of Chick Bill, a young cowboy who lives in Arizona, helping people in need and righting wrongs. His companions include an Indian child called Little Poodle ("Petit Caniche" in the French version), a gruff sheriff called Dog Bull and the latter's bumbling and dim-witted deputy, Kid Ordinn. Chick Bill and Little Poodle act as the series' heroes while Dog Bull and Kid Ordinn are the comic relief characters. Kid Ordinn is also the series' antihero and the real protagonist of many episodes.

== Evolution ==
In the very first Chick Bill adventures, the characters were portrayed as anthropomorphic animals, rendered in a manner similar to the Disney style and directed at a younger audience, before the series gradually evolved to feature human characters. This change was made when the series began publication in Tintin, at the request of Hergé who was then the magazine's artistic supervisor.

== Sources ==
- Chick Bill publications in Belgian Tintin and French Tintin Archived 2007-09-30 at the Wayback Machine BDoubliées (in French)
- Chick Bill albums Bedetheque (in French)

Footnotes
