= Grzegorz Rosiński =

Polish comic book artist

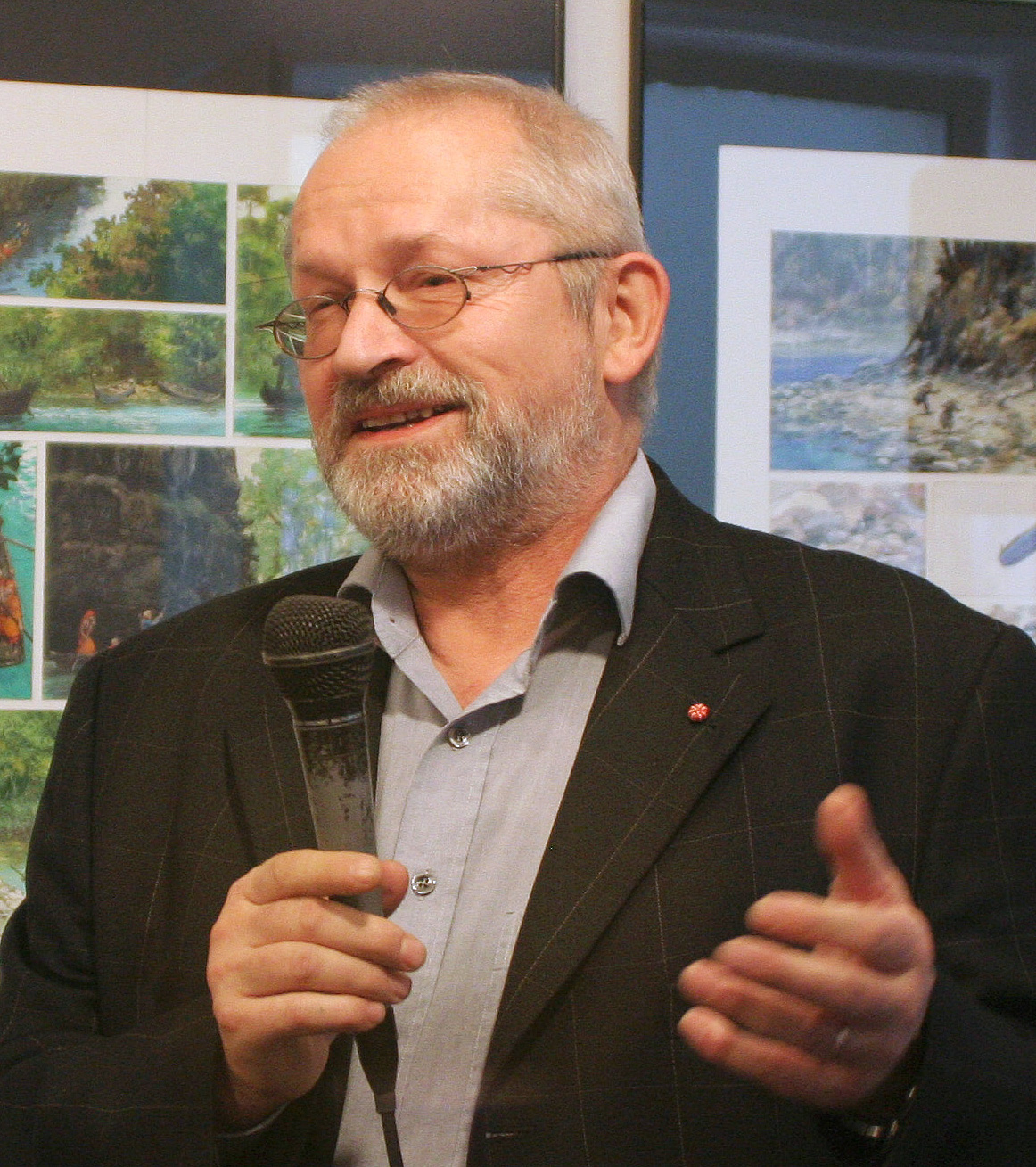
- Born: 3 August 1941 (age 85) Stalowa Wola, Poland
- Area: Artist
- Notable works: Thorgal; Chninkel; Hans
- Awards: Officer's Cross of the Order of Polonia Restituta; Knight's Cross of the Order of Leopold II

Grzegorz Rosiński (Polish: [ˈɡʐɛɡɔʐ rɔˈɕiɲskʲi]; born 3 August 1941) is a Polish comic book artist, illustrator and painter. He is best known for providing the artwork for the series Thorgal. His other notable work includes art drawn in the Hans and Chninkel series of comic books.

== Life and career ==
=== Early life and education ===
Grzegorz Rosiński was born in Stalowa Wola in 1941. In 1967 he graduated the Liceum of Fine Arts in Warsaw and then joined the Academy of Fine Arts of Warsaw.

=== Major works ===
Until the late 1970s he authored numerous book illustrations for various Polish publishers and authors. He also authors some of the most popular Polish comic book series of the time, including the Illustrated History of Poland, Kapitan Żbik and Pilot śmigłowca. Initially publishing his comic books only in newspapers and magazines (among them Sztandar Młodych), with time his works started to be published separately. He is also the creator and the first editor of the Relax magazine, the first Polish language magazine devoted solely to comic books.

In 1976 Rosiński received a scholarship in Belgium, where he met Jean Van Hamme, who wrote for him the series Thorgal, one of the most popular European comic book series. Since 1980, 31 volumes have been published. The comic has appeared in Tintin magazine. Rosiński also has made some comics for the Spirou magazine, under the pseudonym 'Rosek'. Although he returned to Poland, he continued in the next decades to collaborate with Belgian and French authors. In 1980 he started another successful series of comic books named Hans, (Note: When the series was published in Poland in the 1980s, they decided to change the protagonist's name and the title to Yans, probably because of name collision with popular character Hans Kloss from More Than Life At Stake TV series.) this time with André-Paul Duchâteau. In 1992 Rosiński was replaced by Zbigniew Kasprzak (Kas) as the artist of the series.

After the imposition of the Martial Law in Poland in 1981, Rosiński moved to Belgium. At first, he lived with Jean Van Hamme while his wife and three kids stay behind in Warsaw. A few years later he received Belgian citizenship. He became one of the most popular authors of comic books in Western Europe. Among his later works are a series Chninkel (with Van Hamme) started in 1987 and a 1992 series titled La complainte des landes perdues (with Jean Dufaux). In 2001 the Rosiński-Van Hamme duo published yet another comic book titled Western, based on a western plot, in which Rosiński changed his style considerably. Since 2004 he published a series on Count Skarbek (with Yves Sente).

During the summer of 2011, a major exhibition was shown in the medieval town of Saint-Ursanne, Switzerland.

=== Honours ===
In 2006, he was awarded the Officer's Cross of the Order of Polonia Restituta for his "outstanding artistic achievements and the promotion of Polish culture". In 2007, during the International Festival of Comics and Games in Łódź, he was awarded the Silver Medal for Merit to Culture – Gloria Artis. In 2010, he received the Knight's Cross of the Order of Leopold II from King Albert II of Belgium.

== Personal life ==
Currently, Grzegorz Rosiński lives in Burgdorf, Switzerland.

== Awards ==
- 1979: Award for Best Realistic Artwork at the Prix Saint-Michel, Brussels, Belgium
- 1983: Award for Best Comic at the Prix Saint-Michel
- 1987: Grand prix des Alpages, Sierre, Switzerland
- 1989: Audience award at the Angoulême International Comics Festival, France
- 1990: nominated for Best Long Comic Strip at the Haxtur Awards, Spain
- 1991: winner of the Best Drawing award and the Public Vote award and nominated for Best Short Comic Strip at the Haxtur Awards
- 1994: nominated for Best Cover at the Haxtur Awards
- 2003: nominated for the Audience Award at the Angoulême International Comics Festival
- 2004: Grand Prix Saint-Michel

- nominated for Best Short Comic Strip at the Haxtur Awards

- 2005: Sanglier d'Or at the festival of Nîmes, France

- nominated for the Audience Award at the Angoulême International Comics Festival
- nominated for Best Short Comic Strip and Best Cover at the Haxtur Awards

- 2006: nominated for Best Comic (French language) at the Prix Saint-Michel

- nominated for Best Long Comic Strip a Best Drawing at the Haxtur Awards

== Selected bibliography ==
- Thorgal 1980-still published (with Jean van Hamme and Yves Sente), 34 albums, Le Lombard
- Hans 1983-1996 (with André-Paul Duchâteau), 5 albums solo, 3 albums together with Kas, Le Lombard
- The fantastic boottrip 1987-1988 (with J-C Smit Le Bénédicte), 2 albums, Le Lombard
- Le Grand Pouvoir du Chninkel 1988 (with Jean van Hamme), 1 album, Casterman
- La complainte des landes perdues 1993-1998 (with Jean Dufaux), 4 albums, Dargaud
- Western 2001 (with Jean van Hamme), 1 album, Le Lombard
- The revenge of count Skarbek 2004-2005 (with Yves Sente), 2 albums, Dargaud
