= Modeste et Pompon =

Belgian comic series

Modeste and Pompon

Modeste and Pompon (Modeste et Pompon) is a Belgian comic series consisting mainly of humorous one-page short stories about a temperamental young man and his girlfriend. Created by André Franquin, it was first published in Tintin magazine on 19 October 1955.

== Publication history ==
In 1955 comic-book artist André Franquin got into a dispute with Dupuis, the publishers of Spirou magazine, over financial arrangements concerning his characters. Since Franquin was unable to find the written confirmation of their agreement, he left to join the staff of the rival Tintin magazine, where he introduced the series Modeste et Pompon. Writers who contributed to the series included René Goscinny (the writer of Asterix), Peyo (creator of the Smurfs), Greg (another leading writer and artist) and even Franquin's mother-in-law.

Franquin later found the written confirmation and the matter was settled with Dupuis. However, he was on a five-year contract with Tintin and was thus obliged to provide to both magazines, an unusual arrangement in the comic industry. He thus contributed a weekly page to Tintin and a weekly page-and-a-half to Spirou.

In 1959 the publishers of Tintin bought the rights to the characters. Franquin's obligation to Tintin ended and he stuck to Spirou and Gaston Lagaffe. Modeste et Pompon continued until 1988, handled by other writers and artists.

== Characters ==
Félix hurries off after a sale has gone wrong, Modeste is in a typical mood, Pompon appeals for calm and the boys look on.

- Pompon is Modeste's girlfriend. Her main occupation is to appeal to him to stay calm.
- Modeste is a short-tempered young suburbanite who is easily angered when things go wrong. Among those causing him to lose his cool are:
- Félix, a friend and a cousin but also a pesky salesman whose products invariably lead to disaster;
- A group of boys who are Félix's and Modeste's nephews, but who hang around Modeste most of the time;
- Mister Dubruit, a neighbour with a noisy family (Du bruit is the French for "noise"), only featured by Goscinny;
- Mister Ducrin, another neighbour with whom Modeste is always feuding, only featured by Greg;
- Uncle Symphorien who sometimes stays with Modeste, bringing along his pet rooster Jules, whose crowing proves very trying to Modeste's nerves.

== Trivia ==
After a short stay with his pet rooster, Modeste's uncle is about to leave for home and Modeste serves up a goodbye meal, the main course of which is coq au vin ("rooster with wine"). Uncle Symphorien suddenly has a horrid suspicion. "JULES!?!" "Ah! Ah! Ah! Er... a... a silly thought... Tee, hee, hee!... Yes! Silly!... Er... Pay no attention... Er, by the way, my train leaves at 6 tomorrow morning, nephew... Tee, hee!" Drawn by Franquin, written by Greg

Franquin's period on the strip is seen as a good reflection of the fashions of the 1950s, from Pompon's dress to Modeste's modern furniture (which, along with his temper, rather belies his name). The items Felix tries to sell to Modeste include a TV remote control and a battery-powered drill which, though common enough today, were rather new at the time. The artists who succeeded Franquin updated the fashions to their own time periods and even removed Pompon's namesakes from her hair.

When the group of boys were first introduced, they were Félix's five cousins. Later they became his nephews and numbered four before settling on just three. Franquin only named one of them: Dédé. Later writers varied the names. The boys appear to be identical and wear different-coloured shirts.

At one stage Modeste was asked to look after a relative's baby and faced the dilemmas of feeding, changing and sleepless nights. This set of stories coincided with the early months of the life of Franquin's daughter Isabelle (who was to lend her name to another popular comic series in which her father was involved).

== Timeline ==
- 1955-1959: Franquin (stories by Franquin, Goscinny and mostly Greg)
- 1959-1968: Dino Attanasio
- 1968-1975: Mitteï
- 1975: Griffo
- 1976-1984: Dupont
- 1980-1988: Walli
- 1981: Eric

== Sources ==
- Modeste et Pompon publications in Belgian Tintin, French Tintin BDoubliées (in French)

Footnotes
