= Ric Hochet =

Franco-Belgian comics series

Publication information
- Publisher: Dargaud; Le Lombard
- Format: Bande Dessinée
- Publication date: 1955 - Present
- Main character(s): Ric Hochet; Commissaire Bourdon; Nadine

Creative team
- Created by: André-Paul Duchâteau; Tibet
- Written by: André-Paul Duchâteau
- Artist: Tibet

Ric Hochet is a Franco-Belgian comics series created by Tibet (drawings) and André-Paul Duchâteau (scripts). It first appeared on March 30, 1955, in the Franco-Belgian comics magazine Tintin.

== Synopsis ==
The series features the adventures of Ric Hochet, a reporter for the newspaper La Rafale in Paris.

== Characters ==
Ric Hochet
A journalist from Paris with a strong sense of justice who takes huge risks to see a culprit brought to justice. His first name "Ric" is a diminutive; but while Duchâteau has stated that Ric's first name is "Frédéric", while Tibet has insisted on "Richard".
Commissaire Sigismond Bourdon
Ric's close friend and most important contact with the Paris police department.
Nadine
Bourdon's grandniece and later on Ric's girlfriend.
Richard Hochet
Ric's father, a former gentleman thief and fugitive from the police who appears sporadically in the series, mostly to help Ric (or for Ric to help him) out of sticky situations.
Inspector Ledru
Bourdon's assistant, and mostly a rival to Hochet and his superior. He later becomes the captain of an anti-terrorism unit.
Bob Drumond
First a journalist, later editor of La Rafale, and a close friend of Ric.
Professor Hermelin
A bad-tempered and cowardly but genius scientist with a dislike for Bourdon.
"Le Bourreau" ("The Executioner")/"B"
A sadistic, overweight spy for a foreign power and a long-term enemy of Ric. He is habitually exchanged for another prisoner to haunt his nemesis anew. After trying to get revenge in Ric by having him implicated for several murders, he finally dies in Dernier Duel when he gets shot with a blank cartridge by Ric.
Lambert
An unscrupulous journalist, formerly working for La Rafale before taking a new job at the rival newspaper agency Paris-Night. However, in tough cases he is able to provide Ric with essential informations.
Lamberto
A flamboyant, sensationalist Italian movie director.

== Translations ==
The series' name deviated as translations were published across Europe, with the result that it is known as Rick Master in Germany, Rik Ringers in The Netherlands and Flanders, Riku Oksa in Finland and Allan Falk and Rick Hart in Scandinavia. Ric Hochet's stories were also published in South India in Tamil Language by Prakash Publishers. Ric Hochet is known as "Reporter Johnny" in Tamil. Ric Hochet's stories were published in Egypt in the Arabic version of the magazine Tintin (magazine) (تان تان), which was issued between 1971 and 1980.

French	English	German	Italian	Finnish	Dutch	Swedish	Tamil	Arabic
Ric Hochet	Ric Hochet	Rick Master	Ric Roland	Riku Oksa	Rik Ringers	Allan Falk / Rick Hart	Reporter Johnny	Ric Hochet (ريك هوشيه)
Commissaire Bourdon		Kommissar Bourdon	Commissario Bourdon		Commissaris Baardemakers	Kommissarie Bourdon	Police Commissioner Boudon	Commissioner Boudon
Nadine		Nadine	Nadine		Nadine	Nadine	Nadine	Nadine
Richard Hochet		Richard Hochet			Richard Ringers		Richard	
Inspecteur Ledru		Inspektor Ledru	Ispettore Ledru		Kempers		Inspector Ledru	
Bob Drumond		Bob Drumond			Bob Dalberg	Bob Drumont	Bob	
Professeur Hermelin		Professor Hermelin			professor Hermelijn		Professor Hermelin	

== Albums ==
1. Traquenard au Havre
2. Mystère à Porquerolles
3. Défi à Ric Hochet
4. L'ombre de Caméléon
5. Piège pour Ric Hochet
6. Rapt sur le France
7. Suspense à la télévision
8. Face au serpent
9. Alias Ric Hochet
10. Les 5 revenants
11. Cauchemar pour Ric Hochet
12. Les spectres de la nuit
13. Les compagnons du diable
14. Ric Hochet contre le Bourreau
15. Le monstre de Noireville
16. Requiem pour une idole
17. Épitaphe pour Ric Hochet
18. Enquête dans le passé
19. Les signes de la peur
20. L'homme qui portait malheur
21. Alerte! Extra - Terrestres
22. Le trio maléfique
23. La ligne de mort
24. La piste rouge
25. Coups de griffes chez Bouglione
26. L'ennemi à travers les siècles
27. L'épée sur la gorge
28. Hallali pour Ric Hochet
29. Opération 100 milliards
30. Le fantôme de l'alchimiste
31. K.O. en 9 rounds (short stories)
32. Tribunal noir
33. Le scandale Ric Hochet
34. La nuit des vampires
35. La mort noire
36. La flèche de sang
37. Le maléfice Vaudou
38. Face au crime
39. Le disparu de l'enfer
40. Le double qui tue
41. La maison de la vengeance
42. La liste mortelle
43. Les messagers du trépas
44. Ric Hochet contre Sherlock
45. Le triangle Attila
46. Les témoins de Satan
47. Les jumeaux diaboliques
48. Le secret d'Agatha
49. L'exécuteur des ténèbres
50. Le crime de l'an 2000
51. La bête de l'apocalypse
52. Le maître de l'illusion
53. Meurtre à l'Impro
54. Le masque de la terreur
55. Qui a peur d'Hitchcock
56. Un million sans impôt
57. L'heure du kidnapping
58. Premières armes (comics)|Premières armes (Reprinted)
59. La main de la mort
60. Crime sur Internet
61. Le jeu de la potence
62. B.D. meurtres
63. La sorcière mal aimée
64. Le contrat du siècle
65. Panique sur le Web
66. Penthouse story
67. Le nombre maudit
68. Le collectionneur de crimes
69. L'homme de glace
70. Silence de mort (Ric Hochet)|Silence de mort
71. La dernière impératrice
72. Le trésor des Marolles
73. On tue au théâtre ce soir
74. Puzzle mortel
75. Code pour l'au-delà
76. Dernier duel
77. Ici, 77
78. A la poursuite du griffon d'or

== In popular culture ==
Ric Hochet is among the many Belgian comics characters to jokingly have a Brussels street named after them. The Galerie du Roi/ Koningsgalerij has a commemorative plaque with the name Rue Ric Hochet/ Rik Ringers Straat placed under the actual street sign.

In 1994, as part of the Brussels' Comic Book Route, a wall was designed in the Rue du Bon Secours/ Bijstandsstraat in Brussels. The wall was designed by G. Oreopoulos and D. Vandegeerde.

== Sources ==
- Ric Hochet publications in Belgian Tintin and French Tintin BDoubliées (in French)
- Ric Hochet albums Bedetheque (in French)

Footnotes
