= Buddy Longway =

Belgian comic series

- Main character Buddy Longway with the logo of the series
- Author: Derib
- Illustrator: Derib
- Current status/schedule: Discontinued
- Launch date: 1974
- End date: 2006
- Publisher: Le Lombard
- Genre(s): Adventure, Western

Buddy Longway is a western bande dessinée written by the Swiss cartoonist Derib. It is published under the Le Lombard publishing house. The first album came out in 1972, and 16 albums were published until 1987. Derib restarted the series in 2002, continuing with four further albums until 2006, when he announced that the 20th album, La Source, would be the last.

Both the story arcs and the drawings are praised for the realistic portrayal of the simplistic, rough life as a trapper.

== Overview ==
The series is a family saga which centers around the eponymous character Buddy Longway, a trapper who lives in the wilderness. He lives married to a Sioux Native American woman called Chinook. In the course of the series, they have two children, Jeremy and Kathleen.

Main topics of the series, which is set in the 19th century, are living in the wilderness, interracial relationships, Native American culture, coming of age (Jeremy and Kathleen) and age (Buddy Longway).

== Background ==
Longway is described as a brooding, vulnerable character who visibly ages during the course of the series. Derib commented: "I am someone very emotional and I believe to know how to transfer this dimension into a comic book." Derib deliberately chose this slant, which was unusual compared to contemporary Western comics like Lucky Luke or Blueberry: "I wanted to renew the narrative modes in comics, especially the notion that a hero should be perfect, invincible or immortal (e.g. Lucky Luke or Blueberry), so my idea was to write about a simple man."

Derib said he was extremely fond of Longway, so much that he almost regarded him like a son.
