= Claude Auclair =

French cartoonist

Claude Auclair (1 May 1943 – 20 January 1990) was a French cartoonist. He is best known for the post-apocalyptic comic series Simon du Fleuve.
