= Thorgal =

Fantasy comic series

- Cover of Le Barbare (2002 Lombard Editions), art by Grzegorz Rosiński
- Created by: Jean Van Hamme; Grzegorz Rosiński

Publication information
- Publisher: Lombard Editions (French); Cinebook Ltd (English); Lion Comics (Tamil)
- Formats: Original material for the series has been published as a strip in the comics anthology(s) Tintin magazine and a set of graphic novels.
- Original language: French
- Genre: Action/adventure, science fantasy; Mythology
- Publication date: 1977 – present

Reprints
- Title(s): Full list
- The series has been reprinted, at least in part, in Danish, Dutch, English, Finnish, German, Greek, Norwegian, Polish, Swedish, and Turkish.

Thorgal is a science fantasy adventure series created in the Franco-Belgian bandes dessinées (BD) tradition by Belgian writer Jean Van Hamme and Polish graphic artist Grzegorz Rosiński. Debuting in 1977, it has incorporated elements of Norse mythology and the legend of Atlantis, as well as science fiction and horror.

In 2002, it was adapted as an adventure video game, Thorgal: Curse of Atlantis, by Cryo Interactive Entertainment.

== Development ==
The comic first appeared in serial form in Tintin magazine in 1977, with the story La Magicienne Trahie. Originally a stand-alone 30-page project, its early success encouraged turning it into a longer series.

It has subsequently been published in hardcover volumes by Le Lombard from 1980 on. Translations have appeared in among others, English, Dutch, German, Polish, Italian, Spanish, Danish, Swedish, Norwegian, Tamil and Greek.

Covers for all comic albums are drawn by Rosiński, even for the spin-off albums which sometimes are drawn by other artists.

== Reception and significance ==
Thorgal is critically acclaimed and one of the most popular French language BDs, with more than 11 million Thorgal books in print. There are currently three ongoing successful spin-off series, in addition to the continuation of the main Thorgal series.

It has been called the most popular series published by Le Lombard.

D. Aviva Rothschild in her 1995 book Graphic Novels: A Bibliographic Guide to Book-length Comics praised the series, stating that it is "better than an American swords-and-sorcery comic" when it comes to both art and stories. Commenting on The Archers volume, Rothschild described it as "one of the finest pieces of heroic fantasy I have ever set my eyes on".

The series has also been credited with popularizing the BD in Poland.

== Main characters ==
Thorgal Aegirsson, the main character of the series

- Thorgal Aegirsson: Son of Varth and Haynee, grandson of Xargos – a captain of a spaceship on a way to Earth in search of energy. He is raised by Vikings after his ship crash-lands. He possesses character traits and morality that many Vikings consider a sign of weakness. Thorgal is still a courageous and skillful warrior and an archer of phenomenal skill. His life's goal is to find a place for his family to live in peace. For a time, he is stripped of his memory, and becomes the pirate lord Shaigan, though his compassion remained unaltered.
- Aaricia: Thorgal's wife and the daughter of Gandalf the Mad, a Viking leader. She is bound to Thorgal from the moment of her birth by a magic object named Tjahzi's Tears. Aaricia is a spirited and strong-willed woman, who loves her family dearly despite all the mishaps Thorgal's fate brings to their lives.
- Jolan: Thorgal's son. He possesses supernatural powers as the heritage of Thorgal's mysterious ancestry. For most of the series his power is limited to molecular agitation (usually the ability to disintegrate objects). He gradually learns to hone his ability.
- Louve: Thorgal and Aaricia's daughter, who has the ability to communicate with animals.
- Kriss of Valnor: A young, beautiful, unscrupulous and deadly warrior, and also a skilled archer. She first appears in Les Archers, and then intermittently in the following stories. She is in some ways Thorgal's greatest nemesis, and repeatedly tries to hurt him and his family, but occasionally shows hints of admiration and even secret love for Thorgal. When Thorgal loses his memory, she tricks him into believing that they are married, and convinces Thorgal that he is the ruthless pirate lord Shaigan. She becomes pregnant with his son Aniel, whom her father Kahaniel of Valnor wished to reincarnate himself, but Thorgal eventually regains his memory and leaves to find his true family. Later, she ends up as a slave in Byzantium and apparently sacrifices her life to help Thorgal's family escape from the same slave pits, but is later revealed to be alive and queen in the northern lands.
- Aniel: the young son of Thorgal and Kriss of Valnor, conceived while Thorgal lived as the pirate lord Shaigan. He and his mother fall prey to Byzantian slavers, and his vocal cords are cut to forestall crying, leaving him mute. Later, Kriss and Aniel escape the slave pits with Aaricia, Jolan and Louve, who had also been brought there. When Kriss is wounded by her pursuers and prepared to make her last stand, she asks Aaricia to take care of Aniel. Aaricia agrees and takes Aniel in as one of her own children. Aniel is later kidnapped to serve as a host body for Kahlim, grand master of the Red Mages of the oriental city of Bag Dadh (Le Feu écarlate). With the help of Armenos the Mage, both Kahaniel and Kahlim are exorcised from him, but having become hateful of Thorgal, he leaves with his mother.

Xargos (Tanatloc)
Vilnia	Kahaniel of Valnor	Olgava	Varth (Ogotai)	Haynee	Gandalf the Mad
Manthor	Kriss of Valnor	Thorgal Aegirsson	Aaricia	Bjorn Gandalfson
Aniel of Valnor	Jolan	Louve

== Other characters ==
- Ogotai (also known as Varth): the war-loving, merciless "god" brought by the sea into the land of Qâ (a presumably South American pre-Columbian civilization). He leads his people into countless conquests of the neighboring tribes and orders endless human sacrifices to himself. He has superior intelligence, knowledge of highly advanced technology, and supernatural powers, which he uses to trick people into believing he is a true god. In reality, he is a grief-stricken, crazed man, driven by the vengeance against the planet he believes responsible for the death of his beloved wife and son.
- Tanatloc (also known as Xargos): another "god" living in the land of Qâ. He is the nemesis of Ogotai, with whom he shares a secret past. He is kept hidden from his people.
- Darek and Lehla: brother and sister children of banished Vikings who met Aaricia and her family after they had been banished from their village following Shaigan's raids against their people. They joined Thorgal and his family on their journey, but after a few adventures they decided to stay behind on an island Thorgal and Louve had just liberated from a tyrant (Arachneà). However, Lehla later turns up a slave in the northern lands, where she is liberated by Thorgal and taken along for his search for Aniel (Le bateau-sabre). They later recover Darek from slavery in the jungle kingdom of Zhari (Aniel), and they subsequently join Thorgal's extended family.
- The Key Guardian: a powerful magician, who is (or maybe just assumes the form of) a beautiful woman. The gods have entrusted her with the task of guarding the passages between worlds. She walks between the worlds, wearing nothing but a golden girdle that grants her powers and immortality. She has (like many other female characters appearing in the series) a crush on Thorgal, but she respects his loyalty to his family. Because of her love, she is eventually dismissed as a Guardian, cast out into the mortal world, and adopts the name Cleo (Louve #6: "La Reine des Alfes noirs").
- Tjall (called by some people Tjall-The-Fiery): the young, hot-headed nephew of Treefoot and friend of Thorgal. An excellent archer with a good heart and a silly mind, who has a crush on Kriss. He later dies while accompanying Thorgal to the City of the Lost God (La Cité du Dieu Perdu), saving him from a raging mob.
- Argun Treefoot: He's uncle of Tjall. He's a warrior past his prime and with a pegleg, but still an exceptional archer and bowmaker. One of Thorgal's few friends.
- Solveig: she is a Viking who is the best friend of Aaricia. Devoted friend she will help the family Aegirsson.
- Shaniah: a teenage girl from a village enamored in the adult and married Thorgal. Out of jealousy she causes a great tragedy in Thorgal's life, but later redeems herself by giving her own life to save Aaricia.
- Gandalf the Mad: Aaricia's father and king of the Vikings of the North. He became the leader of his tribe after Thorgal's adoptive father's death. Greedy, cruel and mad, he makes repeated attempts at Thorgal's life, whom he perceives a threat to the legitimacy of his own rule.
- Tiago and Ileniya: brother and sister descendants of a group of space-farers who had landed on Midgard and formed the fabled kingdom of Atlantis. They foiled their elders' plan to enslave the world and travelled together with Thorgal and his family. Soon afterwards, however, they were all taken as slaves to a Byzantinian governor and his sadistic son Heraclius, who made Ilyena his personal 'pet". When Tiago tried to stop Heraclius from abusing his sister, the nobleman murdered him; in revenge, Ileniya killed Heraclius later on and, facing imminent death, joined her brother by throwing herself off a cliff.
- Snake Nidhogg: a powerful, mythological monster creature, which Thorgal dared to go against in his youth with the help of the goddess Frigg. Based on Níðhöggr from Norse mythology.
- Volsung of Nichor: A cunning, treacherous schemer. He first appears as Thorgal's competitor in Three Elders of Aran, but apparently dies in the tests they have to face. Actually, Nidhogg saves him to be her servant; his mission is to gain the Girdle of Immortality from the Guardian of the Keys. For betraying her, she transforms Volsung into a toad and keeps him with her trapped in the neverness.
- Muff: A dog that belongs to Jolan & Louve. He appears for the last time in "The Blue Sickness", when he stayed on the island of Our Ground, together with Darek de Svear and his sister Lehla, because he was too old to travel any further.
- Alinoë: Appeared in the volume of the same name as a violent, primitive boy with green hair, later revealed to be part of Jolan's imagination. He vanished when Jolan's mysterious bracelet was removed by Thorgal.
- Manthor: a Viking Half-God who cures Thorgal in "Sacrifice". He is the son of Kahaniel of Valnor and the half-brother of Kriss of Valnor.
- Vigrid: One of the lesser Gods of Asgard who is indebted towards Aaricia for having helped him after having gone blind. He repays this debt by helping her husband reach Manthor and bringing her back to her ancestral home. However, his love for Aaricia eventually made him abandon a task set by the gods, compelling Frigg to banish him from Asgard to Svartalfheim (Louve #5: "Skald"). However, he finally earns his eventual pardon by taking the recalcitrant Niddhog's destined place as the guardian of Yggdrasil (Louve #7: "Niddhog").
- The Kingdom of Zhar (first featured in Le Mal Bleu)
  - Zarkaj and Zajkar: The twin princes of Zhar. To avoid dynastic disputes, Zajkar was chosen to be killed right after birth, but survived and was taken in by the Myrms. After growing to manhood, and with Thorgal's help, he reclaims his rightful place and reconciles with his brother, with whom he rules the realm as a diarchy.
  - Armenos: A reclusive mage and inventor. He first saves Thorgal and his family from the Blue Death disease, and later Aniel from his dual possession (Aniel).
  - Zim: A member of the Myrms, Zharians afflicted with dwarfism and made outcast swamp-dwellers. Zim falls in love with Thorgal upon his first visit, but respects his faithfulness to his family. When Thorgal returns to Zhar after completing his search for Aniel, Zim loses her life in the last decisive battle against a horde of Amazons.
- Gilli and Ava: The children of Grimur from the village of Mikladalur, a henchman of the sysselmann of Kalsoy. While Gilli is a normal human boy, Ava is half selkie, the result of Grimur having captured himself one of the seal-folk as his wife. When Grimur kidnapped Louve to rear her as a new wife, Thorgar and Jolan went to her rescue, which set off a chain of events which lifted a curse bestowed on the islanders by the selkies; Grimur is killed in an uprising against the tyrannical sysselmann, while Ava's mother recovers her pelt and returns into the sea. With their parents gone, the two children are taken in as part of Thorgal's family (La selkie).

== Fictional character biography ==
After being lost at sea, the ship of Viking leader Leif Haraldson finds its way home, guided by a mysterious light in the fog. To the superstitious Vikings, the light is seen as a sign from the gods. Once on shore, they find a sort of capsule, which appears to be the source of the mysterious light. Leif opens the capsule and finds a newborn baby boy. He names the child Thor-gal Aegirs-son, after Thor, the Norse God of Thunder, and Aegir, the ruler of the sea, because he considers Thorgal to be a gift from the Gods. Leif takes Thorgal under his care as his adoptive son.

As Thorgal grows up, he is curious about his origins and often ostracized by his peers for not being a "real" Viking. On his sixth birthday, Leif gives him two strange artifacts taken from the capsule he was found in. One is a jewel made from "the metal that doesn't exist". The jewel brings Thorgal on his first adventure, and binds his fate forever with that of Aaricia (his future wife). When Thorgal is twelve, the other gift prompts him to visit an old wiseman, who reveals to Thorgal his origins and true identity. He tells him that he's one of the last survivors of a group of technologically advanced space-farers who came to the planet in search of new energy sources. His people have great supernatural powers like changing the molecular composition of matter with their mind; powers that Thorgal himself seems not to have. Thorgal learns about his real parents and grandfather, and the events that preceded his birth. The old man decides to erase Thorgal's memory of their encounter and the knowledge he just learned, believing that it will be better for Thorgal to grow up as a "normal" Viking boy with no supernatural powers. Thorgal, however, continues to grow up as curious and conflicted about his true identity as ever.

Soon after this event Leif Haraldson dies and Gandalf the Mad is chosen as his successor. Gandalf repeatedly tries to get rid of Thorgal, because -– as he constantly reminds everyone – Thorgal is an outsider and not of Viking blood. In reality, Gandalf feels threatened because Thorgal is Leif's heir. In the meantime, Thorgal's relationship with Aaricia, Gandalf's daughter, develops and strengthens. While her wishes do not have much influence on her father, she is able to save Thorgal from certain death (by her father's hand) through her determination and ingenuity.

The first album of the series starts some years later, when Thorgal is already an adult, and Gandalf devises a plan to kill him after realizing how deep the love his daughter has for Thorgal really is.

== Collected French language editions ==
The albums consist of several story arcs and many stand-alone stories.

=== Mainline series ===
Jean Van Hamme (story) and Grzegorz Rosiński (art)

Le Lombard editions:

- 1. La Magicienne Trahie (1980) - (ISBN 2-8036-0358-6)
- 2. L'Ile des Mers gelées (1980) - (ISBN 2-8036-0359-4)
- 3. Les Trois Vieillards du pays d'Aran (1981) - (ISBN 2-8036-0001-3)
- 4. La Galère Noire (1982) (start of the Brek Zarith story arc) - (ISBN 2-8036-0026-9)
- 5. Au-delà des Ombres (1983) - (ISBN 2-8036-0407-8)
- 6. La chute de Brek Zarith (1984) (end of the Brek Zarith story arc) - (ISBN 2-8036-0451-5)
- 7. L'enfant des étoiles (1984) (3 short stories from Thorgal's youth) - (ISBN 2-8036-0448-5)
- 8. Alinoë (1985) - (ISBN 2-8036-0482-5)
- 9. Les Archers (1986) - (ISBN 2-8036-0515-5)
- 10. Le Pays Qâ (1986) (start of the Qâ story arc) - (ISBN 2-8036-0549-X)
- 11. Les Yeux de Tanatloc (1986) - (ISBN 2-8036-0576-7)
- 12. La Cité du Dieu Perdu (1987) - (ISBN 2-8036-0639-9)
- 13. Entre Terre et Lumière (1988) (end of the Qâ story arc) - (ISBN 2-8036-0713-1)
- 14. Aaricia (1989) (4 short stories from Aaricia's youth) - (ISBN 978-2-8036-0745-7)
- 15. Le Maître des Montagnes (1989) - (ISBN 2-8036-0754-9)
- 16. Louve (1990) - (ISBN 2-8036-0845-6)
- 17. La Gardienne des Clés (1991) - (ISBN 2-8036-0932-0)
- 18. L'épée-soleil (1992) - (ISBN 2-8036-0988-6)
- 19. La Forteresse Invisible (1993) (start of the Shaigan story arc) - (ISBN 2-8036-1052-3)
- 20. La Marque des Bannis (1994) - (ISBN 2-8036-1101-5)
- 21. La Couronne d'Ogotaï (1995) - (ISBN 2-8036-1161-9)
- 22. Géants (1996) - (ISBN 2-8036-1220-8)
- 23. La Cage (1997) (end of the Shaigan story arc) - (ISBN 2-8036-1275-5)
- 24. Arachnéa (1999) - (ISBN 2-8036-1362-X)
- 25. Le Mal Bleu - (1999) - (ISBN 2-8036-1414-6)
- 26. Le Royaume sous le Sable (2001) - (ISBN 2-8036-1665-3)
- 27. Le Barbare (2002) - (ISBN 2-80361-775-7)
- 28. Kriss de Valnor (2004) - (ISBN 2-8036-2003-0)
- 29. Le Sacrifice (2006) - (ISBN 2-8036-2198-3)

Notes

The 29th volume, The Sacrifice, was the final volume scripted by Jean Van Hamme. Here, Thorgal escapes the curse of Odin. He finds peace in the only home he knows: the Viking village of his adopted father, but then must make a choice.

Danish translation of the series appeared in a different order, beginning with the chronicles of Thorgal's youth. The first album in the series La Magicienne Trahie is number 22 in the Danish series.

In Denmark numbers 22-23 (#1-2) were first published by the publisher Interpresse under the name "Cormak", probably to capitalize upon the popular series Conan. The name was soon changed back to "Thorgal" when Carlsen Comics took over the series.

Yves Sente (story) and Grzegorz Rosiński (art)

- 30. Moi, Jolan (2007)
- 31. Le bouclier de Thor (2008)
- 32. La bataille d'Asgard (2010)
- 33. Le bateau-sabre (2011)
- 34. Kah-Aniel (2013)

Notes

Following the 29th volume, the series was written by Yves Sente. These albums initially focussed on Jolan rather than Thorgal.

Xavier Dorison (story) and Grzegorz Rosiński (art)

- 35. Le Feu écarlate (2016)

Yann (story) and Grzegorz Rosinski (art)

- 36. Aniel (2018)

Yann (story) and Fred Vignaux (art)

- 37. L'Ermite de Skellingar (2019)
- 38. La Selkie (2020)
- 39. Neokóra (2021)
- 40. Tupilaks (2022)
- 41. Mille yeux (2023)
- 42. Özurr le Varègue (2024)
- 43. La vengeance de la déesse Skædhi (2025)

=== Les Mondes de Thorgal - Kriss de Valnor ("The Worlds of Thorgal – Kriss of Valnor") ===
Yves Sente (story) and Giulio De Vita (art)

- 1. Je n'oublie rien! (I Forget Nothing!, 2010)
- 2. La sentence des Walkyries (The Valkyries' Judgement, 2012)
- 3. Digne d'une reine (Worthy of a Queen, 2012)
- 4. Alliances (Alliances, 2013)
- 5. Rouge comme le Raheborg (Red as the Raheborg, 2014)

Xavier Dorison and Mathieu Mariolle (story) and Roman Surzhenko (art)

- 6. L'Île des enfants perdus (The Island of Lost Children, 2015)

Xavier Dorison and Mathieu Mariolle (story) and Fred Vignaux (art)

- 7. La Montagne du temps (The Mountain of Time, 2017)
- 8. Le Maître de justice (The Master of Justice, 2018)

=== Spin-off Les Mondes de Thorgal - Louve (Thorgal - Wolf) ===
Yann Le Pennetier (story) and Roman Surzhenko (art)

- 1. Raïssa (Raissa, 2011)
- 2. La Main coupée du dieu Tyr (The Severed Hand of the God Tyr, 2012)
- 3. Le Royaume du chaos (The Realm of Chaos, 2013)
- 4. Crow (Crow, 2014)
- 5. Skald (Skald, 2015)
- 6. La Reine des Alfes noirs (The Queen of the Dark Elves, 2016)
- 7. Nidhogg (Nidhogg, 2017)

=== Spin-off Les Mondes de Thorgal - La Jeunesse de Thorgal (Thorgal - The Youth of Thorgal) ===
Yann Le Pennetier (story) and Roman Surzhenko (art)

- 1. Les Trois Sœurs Minkelsönn (The Three Minkelsönn Sisters, 2013)
- 2. L'Œil d'Odin (Odin's Eye, 2014)
- 3. Runa (Runa, 2015)
- 4. Berserkers (Berserkers, 2016)
- 5. Slive (Slivia, 2017)
- 6. Le Drakkar des glaces (The Frozen Drakkar, 2018)
- 7. La dent bleue (2019)
- 8. Les deux bâtards (2020)
- 9. Les larmes de Hel (2021)
- 10. Sydönia (2022)
- 11. Grym (2024)

=== Thorgal Saga homage series ===
In this series, started in 2023, other writers and artists create a separate story set in the Thorgal universe but outside the canonical series, and without the 48-page constraint the regular albums had, occasionally even exceeding the 100-page count.

- 1. Adieu Aaricia (Robin Recht, 2023, ISBN 9782803679065)
- 2. Wendigo (Fred Duval & Corentin Rouge, 2024, ISBN 9782808213172)
- 3. Shaïgan (Yann & Surzhenko, 2024, ISBN 9782808202923)
- 4. De givre et de feu, 2025
- 5. La cité mouvante, 2026

== Supplementary print publications ==
- Multimedia releases by publisher Seven Sept; concerns background information books elaborating on historical settings and characters of the Thorgal series, enhanced with artwork by Rosinski, interviews, and an included DVD showing the artist at work on the covers of the releases
  - Entre les faux dieux ("Amidst false gods", ISBN 295207528X, 2005) - dealing with The Land of Qa story-cycle
  - Dans les griffes de Kriss ("In the talons of Kriss", ISBN 2916394079, 2006) - dealing with the Kriss of Valnor story-cycle
- Aux Origines des mondes ("Thorgal: Origins of worlds", ISBN 9782803631933, 2012) - a collection of interviews about the creation of spin-off Thorgal series, interviews by Patrick Gaumer with Grzegorz Rosiński, Giuliano de Vita, Yves Sente, Roman Surzhenko and Yann Le Pennetier.
- Rosinski artbook - Thorgal 40 ans ("Rosinski artbook - 40 years of Thorgal", ISBN 9782803670901, 2017) - a 224-page art book that also features other Rosinski's BD artwork besides Thorgal alone.

== English releases ==
All English-language Thorgal album releases have to date adhered to the approximately standard European BD A4-format, rather than the smaller standard format US and UK readerships have historically been accustomed to. The closest format resembling the European one, US and UK readership are traditionally familiar with, is that of the US graphic novel format, though it too is somewhat smaller.

Donning Company Publishers (US) had the earliest three English-language titles published in the 1980s

1. Thorgal, Child of the Stars hardcover was published in 1986 with ISBN 0-89865-501-3
2. The Archers hardcover was published in 1987 with ISBN 0-96178-850-X (a softcover version was a year later published under the company's "Schiffer Pub" imprint with ISBN 0-96178-852-6
3. The Sorceress Betrayed a 96 page softcover omnibus collecting the series' first two volumes La Magicienne Trahie and L'Ile des Mers gelées, was published in 1988 with ISBN 0-96178-851-8 under the company's "Ink Publishing Company" imprint

Cinebook Ltd (UK) released the English-language (main) series up until volume 24 in the softcover print format starting with Child of the Stars and Aaricia in 2007. Europe Comics, partnered with Cinebook along with other publishers, took over the English language publications following their formation in 2015 and released the main series (including rereleases of older titles) plus the spin-off series in digital format only. They started in 2019 with the digital release of the main series, starting with volume 21 which was as the only one released under the same ISBN for both formats. With volume 22 digital releases had from 2020 onward overtaken Cinebook's print releases, which from then on was lagging far behind with their print releases, aside from the circumstance that Cinebook did none of the spin-off series.

=== Mainline series ===
Note: Where two ISBNs are mentioned, the first one concerns the digital release whereas the second one concerns the print release by Cinebook.

0. The Betrayed Sorceress (ISBN 9781849184434) - Collects La Magicienne Trahie and L'Ile des Mers gelées [1 and 2])

1. Child of the Stars (ISBN 9781905460236) - (collects Child of the Stars and Aaricia [7 and 14])
2. The Three Elders of Aran (ISBN 9781905460311) - (collects The Three Elders of Aran and The Black Galley [3 and 4])
3. Beyond the Shadows (ISBN 9781905460458) - (collects Beyond the Shadows and The Fall of Brek Zarith [5 and 6])
4. The Archers (ISBN 9781905460670) - (collects Alinoë and Les Archers [8 and 9])
5. The Land of Qa (ISBN 9781905460809) - (collects Le Pays Qâ and Les Yeux de Tanatloc [10 and 11])
6. City of the Lost God (ISBN 9781849180016) - (collects La Cité du Dieu Perdu and Entre Terre et Lumière [12 and 13])
7. The Master of the Mountains (ISBN 9781849180238) - (contains Le Maître des Montagnes [15])
8. Wolf Cub (ISBN 9781849180351) - (contains Louve [16])
9. The Guardian of the Keys (ISBN 9781849180504) - (contains La Gardienne des Clés [17])
10. The Sun Sword (ISBN 9781849180573) - (contains L'épée-soleil [18])
11. The Invisible Fortress (ISBN 9781849181037) - (contains La Forteresse Invisible [19])
12. The Brand of the Exiles (ISBN 9781849181365) - (contains La Marque des Bannis [20])
13. Ogotai's Crown (ISBN 9781849181426) - (contains La Couronne d'Ogotaï [21])
14. Giants (ISBN 9781849181563) - (Contains Géants [22])
15. The Cage (ISBN 9781849181860) - (Contains La Cage [23])
16. Arachnea (ISBN 9781849182478) - (Contains Arachnéa [24])
17. The Blue Plague (ISBN 9781849182904) - (Contains Le Mal Bleu [25])
18. The Kingdom Beneath the Sand (ISBN 9781849183451) - (Contains Le Royaume sous le Sable [26])
19. The Barbarian (ISBN 9781849183994) - (Contains Le Barbare [27])
20. Kriss of Valnor (ISBN 9781849184229) - (Contains Kriss de Valnor [28])
21. The Sacrifice (ISBN 9781849184267) - (Contains Le Sacrifice [29])
22. I, Jolan (ISBN 9791032807309, 9781849184441) - (Contains Moi, Jolan [30])
23. Thor's Shield (ISBN 9791032807835, 9781849184458) - (Contains Le Bouclier de Thor [31])
24. The Battle of Asgard (ISBN 9791032809181, 9781849184946 - (Contains La Bataille D'Asgard [32])
25. The Blade Ship - (Contains Le Bateau Sabre [33])
26. Kah-Aniel - (Contains Kah-Aniel [34])
27. The Scarlet Fire - (Contains Le Feu écarlate [35])
28. Aniel - (Contains Aniel [36])
29. The Hermit of Skellingar - (Contains L'Ermite de Skellingar [37])
30. The Selkie - (Contains La Selkie [38])
31. Neokora - (Contains Neokóra [39])
32. Tupilaqs - (Contains Tupilaks [40])

=== Kriss of Valnor ===
1. I Forget Nothing! - (Contains Je n'oublie rien!)
2. The Valkyries' Judgement - (Contains La sentence des Walkyries)
3. Worthy of a Queen - (Contains Digne d'une reine)
4. Alliances - (Contains Alliances)
5. Red as a Raheborg - (Contains Rouge comme le Raheborg)
6. The Island of Lost Children - (Contains L'Île des enfants perdus)
7. The Mountain of Time - (Contains La Montagne du temps)
8. The Master of Justice - (Contains Le Maître de justice)

=== Wolfcub ===
1. Raissa - (Contains Raïssa)
2. The Severed Hand of the God - (Contains Tyr La Main coupée du dieu Tyr)
3. The Realm of Chaos - (Contains Le Royaume du chaos)
4. Crow - (Contains Crow)
5. Skald - (Contains Skald)
6. The Queen of the Dark Elves - (Contains La Reine des Alfes noirs)
7. Nidhogg - (Contains Nidhogg)

=== The early years ===
1. The Three Minkelson Sisters - (Contains Les Trois Sœurs Minkelsönn)
2. Odin's Eye - (Contains L'Œil d'Odin)
3. Runa - (Contains Runa)
4. Berserkers - (Contains Berserkers)
5. Slivia - (Contains Slive)
6. The Frozen Drakkar - (Contains Le Drakkar des glaces)

== In other media ==
- A collectible card game based on the Thorgal intellectual property, Thorgal: Kolekcjonerska Gra Karciana, was released in Polish in 2002 by Egmont Polska.
- In 2002, Le Lombard published a video game for Microsoft Windows entitled Thorgal: Curse of Atlantis (La Malédiction d'Odin) and developed by Cryo Interactive Entertainment.
- In 2016, it was announced that the BD is going to be a series directed by Florian Henckel von Donnersmarck. In 2018 von Donnersmarck said that the project is "at the top of his list".
- In 2022, Citel Games published Thorgal: Qâ – Le Jeu (in French only), a cooperative board game based on a specific Thorgal adventure.
- An elaborate and multi-lingual (English, French, German, Italian, Polish, and Spanish) board game was under development in 2023 by Portal Games. A crowd-funding drive was organized to finance the development of the game. The popularity of Thorgal was once again amply demonstrated when the crowd-funding netted the company nearly nine times the funding goal, which was reached within one-and-a-half hour after the start of the drive. The game was set for an April 2024 release and delivered in October of that year.
- In 2024, Polish game developer Mighty Koi announced that they were developing an action-adventure video game titled Thorgal for Windows, PlayStation 5, and Xbox Series X/S.
- In August of 2025, a (non-collectible) card game (Thorgal: The Card Game, Thorgal: Gra karciana, Thorgal : Le Jeu de cartes in English, Polish, and French respectively) was released by Lucrum Games/Studio and Don't Panic Games.
