= Jean Van Hamme =

Belgian novelist and comic book writer (born 1939)

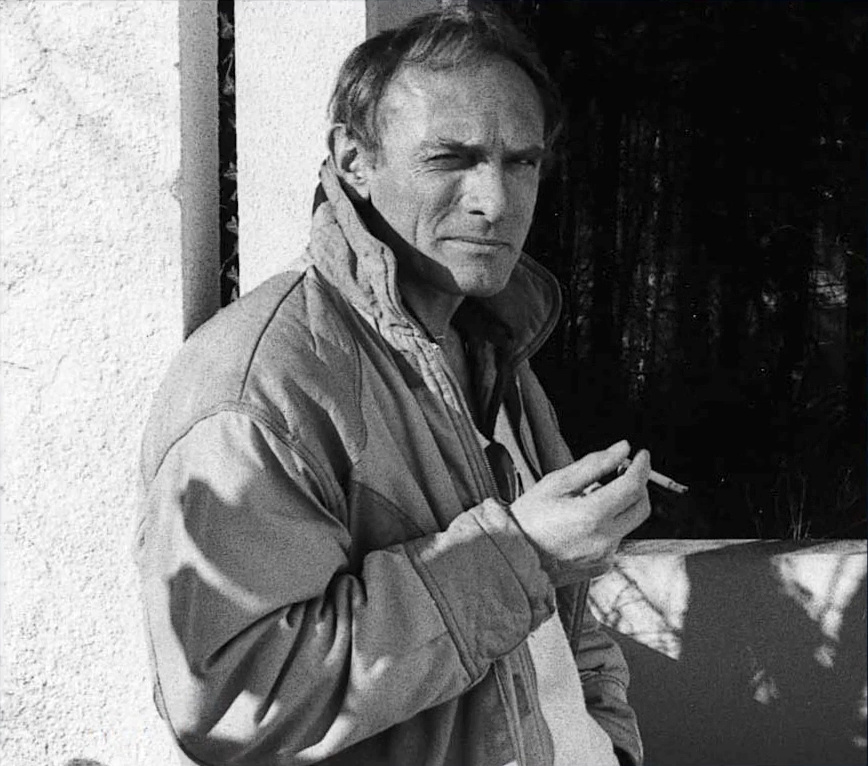
- Born: Jean Van Hamme; 16 January 1939 (age 87) Brussels, Belgium
- Area: Writer
- Notable works: Thorgal; XIII; Largo Winch
- Awards: full list

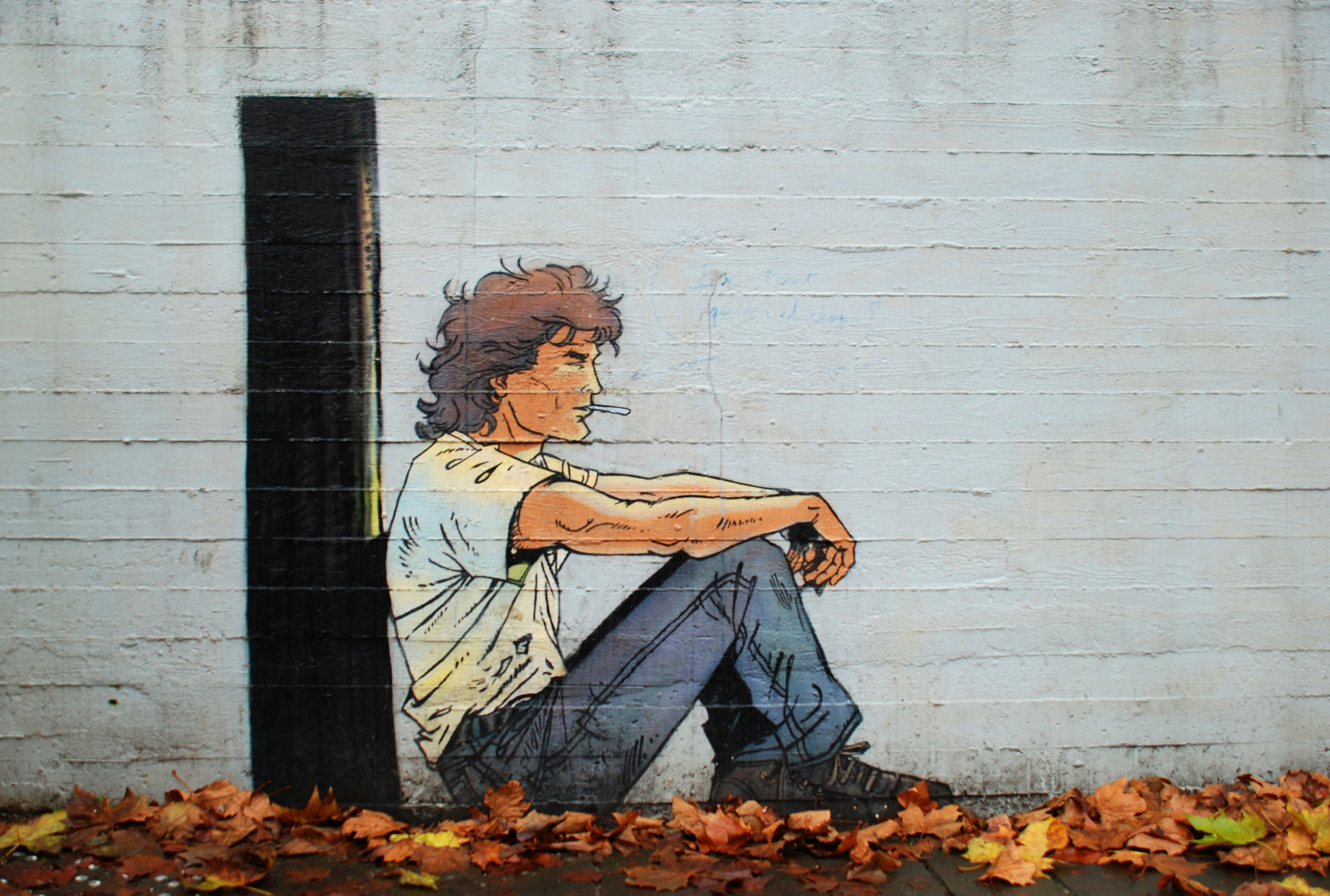
Largo Winch mural on the Place des Sciences in Louvain-la-Neuve (Belgium).

Jean Van Hamme (born 16 January 1939) is a Belgian novelist and comic book writer. He has written scripts for a number of Belgian/French comic series, including Histoire sans héros, Thorgal, XIII and Largo Winch.

== Biography ==
=== Early years ===
After studying business administration at the Solvay Brussels School of Economics and Management, he worked as a journalist and in the marketing department of Philips. In the meantime, he started writing, and one of his first scripts was adapted by Paul Cuvelier in 1968. This erotic comic named Epoxy was published by the controversial publisher Éric Losfeld, who prior to that also had published similarly themed comics like Jean-Claude Forest's Barbarella and Robert Gigi's Scarlett Dream. In 1976, Van Hamme became a full-time writer, and in the next few years he published seven novels and some movie scripts, e.g. for Diva.

=== Thorgal, XIII and Largo Winch ===
Van Hamme's main breakthrough came in 1977, when he created the Viking hero Thorgal for Grzegorz Rosiński, a relatively unknown Polish comic artist. The mix of medieval legends and heroic fantasy soon became a huge success in the Franco-Belgian comics magazine Tintin. The duo won major awards in the French and Belgian comic book industry.

In the next decade, Jean Van Hamme created two new bestselling series, XIII with William Vance and Largo Winch (based on his own novels) with Philippe Francq. Other series like Les maîtres de l'orge (lit. "The Masters of Barley") and Chninkel have received more critical acclaim but lower sales.

The fame of Van Hamme as one of the major comic authors of Europe is quite established. The artists he works with draw the characters in a realistic style, even if the stories themselves tend to verge towards fantasy.

Les maîtres de l'orge and Largo Winch have both been made into TV series, and XIII, Thorgal, and Largo Winch have been adapted into video games.

=== Blake and Mortimer ===
After the death of Edgar Pierre Jacobs, the last unfinished Blake and Mortimer story was finished by Bob de Moor, and Van Hamme was approached by the publisher to write new stories. The first one, The Francis Blake Affair, appeared in 1996 and was a huge success, and Van Hamme has since created two more Blake and Mortimer stories.

In 2002, Jean Van Hamme announced his intention to write fewer comics, and to concentrate more on theatre and film scripts, but seems to have changed his mind again and has since created two new stories. In 2006, he ended his run on Thorgal with album 29, Le Sacrifice. He has also announced his intention to create a spin-off series of Thorgal, focusing on his son Jolan. In fact, a new duo, Grzegorz Rosinski and Yves Sente continued the series with four more albums (#30 to #33) which constitute the "Jolan Cycle".

Van Hamme is one of the best-selling European comics writers, with many of his series in the comics' bestseller lists each year. In 2006, Van Hamme's final volume of Thorgal placed fifth in the French list with 280,000 copies published, while Lady S., with Philippe Aymond, had 90,000 copies. In 2005, XIII and Largo Winch shared the fourth place with 500,000 copies each. In 2010, he was the second-bestselling author of comics in France, after Christophe Arleston but before Albert Uderzo and Hergé, with 1.05 million copies sold.

=== Family ===
Thomas Van Hamme is one of his children.

== Awards ==
- 1978: Best Story at the Prix Saint-Michel, Belgium
- 1980: Best Story at the Prix Saint-Michel
- 1983: Best Comic at the Prix Saint-Michel
- 1989: Audience Award at the Angoulême International Comics Festival, France

– nominated for Best Long Comic Strip at the Haxtur Awards, Spain

- 1990: Best Script at the Haxtur Awards

– nominated for Best Long Comic Strip and Best Short Comic Strip at the Haxtur Awards

- 1991: nominated for Best Short Comic Strip and Best Script at the Haxtur Awards
- 1992: nominated for Best Long Comic Strip and Best Script at the Haxtur Awards
- 1993: France Info Award at the Angoulême International Comics Festival

– nominated for Best Long Comic Strip at the Haxtur Awards

- 1994: Best International Writer at the Max & Moritz Prizes, Germany

– nominated for Best Script at the Haxtur Awards

- 1996: Best Long Comic Strip at the Haxtur Awards

– nominated for Best Script at the Haxtur Awards

- 1997: Audience Award at the Angoulême International Comics Festival
- 2003: nominated thrice for the Audience Award at the Angoulême International Comics Festival
- 2004: nominated for Best Long Comic Strip, Best Short Comic Strip and Best Script at the Haxtur Awards
- 2005: nominated for Best Short Comic Strip at the Haxtur Awards

– nominated for the Audience Award at the Angoulême International Comics Festival

- 2006: nominated for the Audience Award at the Angoulême International Comics Festival

– nominated for the Grand Prix Saint-Michel and for Best Comic (Dutch language) at the Prix Saint-Michel
– nominated for Favourite European Comic at the Eagle Awards, United Kingdom

- 2007: nominated for the Grand Prix Saint-Michel and for Best Story at the Prix Saint-Michel
- 2008: nominated for the Grand Prix Saint-Michel at the Prix Saint-Michel
- 2009: Grand Prix Saint-Michel
- 2010: nominated for Best Dutch Language Comic at the Prix Saint-Michel
- 2011: Commandeur in the Ordre des Arts et des Lettres (the highest of the three ranks for that Order)

== Bibliography ==
- Epoxy: 1 album, 1968, artwork by Paul Cuvelier: Losfeld
- Mr. Magellan: 2 albums, 1970–1971, artwork by Géri: Le Lombard and Dargaud
- Corentin: 2 albums, 1970–1974, artwork by Paul Cuvelier: Le Lombard and Dargaud
- Michael Logan: 4 albums, 1977–1981, artwork by André Beautemps: Thaulez
- Histoire sans héros: 2 albums, 1977–1997, artwork by Dany: Le Lombard and Dargaud
- Domino: 4 albums, 1979–1982, artwork by André Chéret: Le Lombard and Dargaud
- Arlequin: 3 albums, 1979–1985, artwork by Dany: Le Lombard and Dargaud
- Tony Stark: 4 albums, 1980–1982, artwork by Edouard Aidans: Fleurus, Novedi and Hachette
- Thorgal: 33 albums, 1980–2006, artwork by Grzegorz Rosiński: Le Lombard
- XIII: 18 albums, 1984–, artwork by William Vance: Dargaud
- Le Grand Pouvoir du Chninkel: 1 album, 1988, artwork by Grzegorz Rosiński: Casterman
- S.O.S. Bonheur: 3 albums, 1988–1989, artwork by Griffo: Dupuis
- Largo Winch: 18 albums, 1990–, artwork by Philippe Francq: Dupuis
- Les maîtres de l'orge: 8 albums, 1992–1999, artwork by Francis Vallès: Glénat
- Blake and Mortimer: 4 albums, 1996–, artwork by Ted Benoît and René Sterne: Editions Blake et Mortimer
- Wayne Shelton: 13 albums, 2001–2003, 2009-, artwork by Christian Denayer: Dargaud
- De telescoop: 1 album, 2009, artwork by Paul Teng: Casterman
- Lady S: 14 albums

== Sources ==
- Jean Van Hamme publications in English www.europeancomics.net (in English)
