= Tintin (magazine) =

Former Belgian comics magazine

- Tintin No. 1 (26 September 1946)

Publication information
- Publisher: Le Lombard
- Schedule: Weekly
- Publication date: 26 September 1946 – 29 June 1993
- Main character: Tintin

Tintin (French: Le Journal de Tintin; Dutch: Kuifje) was a weekly Belgian comics magazine of the second half of the 20th century. Subtitled "The Magazine for the Youth from 7 to 77", it was one of the major publications of the Franco-Belgian comics scene and published such notable series as Blake and Mortimer, Alix, and the principal title The Adventures of Tintin. Originally published by Le Lombard, the first issue was released in 1946, and it ceased publication in 1993.

Tintin magazine was part of an elaborate publishing scheme. The magazine's primary content focused on a new page or two from several forthcoming comic albums that had yet to be published as a whole, thus drawing weekly readers who could not bear to wait for entire albums. There were several ongoing stories at any given time, giving wide exposure to lesser-known artists. Tintin was also available bound as a hardcover or softcover collection. The content always included filler material, some of which was of considerable interest to fans, for example alternate versions of pages of the Tintin stories, and interviews with authors and artists. Not every comic appearing in Tintin was later put into book form, which was another incentive to subscribe to the magazine. If the quality of Tintin printing was high compared to American comic books through the 1970s, the quality of the albums was superb, utilizing expensive paper and printing processes (and having correspondingly high prices).

== Publication history ==
=== Early history: 1946 to 1949 ===
Raymond Leblanc and his partners had started a small publishing house after World War II, and decided to create an illustrated youth magazine. They decided that Tintin would be the perfect hero, as he was already very well known. Business partner André Sinave went to see Tintin author Hergé, and proposed creating the magazine. Hergé, who had worked for Le Soir during the war, was being prosecuted for having allegedly collaborated with the Germans, and thus was without a publisher. After consulting with his friend Edgar Pierre Jacobs, Hergé agreed.

The first issue, published on 26 September 1946, was in French. It featured Hergé, Jacobs, Paul Cuvelier and Jacques Laudy as artists, with their mutual friend Jacques Van Melkebeke serving as editor. (Due to suspicions of incivism left over from the war, Van Melkebeke was forced to step down as editor soon after.) A Dutch edition, entitled Kuifje, was published simultaneously (Kuifje being the name of the eponymous character Tintin in Dutch). 40,000 copies were released in French, and 20,000 in Dutch.

For Kuifje, a separate editor-in-chief was appointed, Karel Van Milleghem. He invented the famous slogan "The magazine for the youth from 7 to 77", later picked up by the other editions. (Van Milleghem gave Raymond Leblanc the idea for the animation studio Belvision, which became the largest European animation studio, producing ten feature-length movies, including a few featuring Tintin. It was Van Milleghem who also introduced Bob De Moor to the magazine and to Hergé. De Moor became a regular in the magazine and the main artist in the Studio Hergé.)

In 1948, the magazine grew from 12 to 20 pages and a separate version for France was launched. A group of new young artists joined the team: the French Étienne Le Rallic and Jacques Martin, Dino Attanasio and the Flemish Willy Vandersteen.

For decades, Hergé had artistic control over the magazine, even though he was sometimes absent for long periods and new work of his became rarer. His influence is highly evident in Vandersteen's Suske en Wiske for which Hergé imposed a stronger attention to the stories, editing, and a change of art style.

==== The Tintin-voucher ====
In order to keep its readership loyal, Tintin magazine created a sort of fidelity passport, called the "Chèque Tintin" in France (Tintin-voucher) and "Timbre Tintin" in Belgium (Tintin-stamp), which was offered with every issue of the magazine, in every comic album by Le Lombard, and on many food products as well. These stamps could be exchanged for various gifts not available in commercial establishments. Other brands, mostly from food companies, affiliated themselves with the Tintin voucher system: they could be found on flour, semolina boxes, etc. A Tintin soda existed, and even Tintin shoes. The French Railways Company went as far as to propose 100 km of railway transportation for 800 stamps. Among the gifts, there were super chromos extracted from the magazine issues, or original art.

At the time the vouchers were initiated, the magazine was selling 80,000 copies in Belgium and only 70,000 in France. Due to the success of the vouchers, the circulation in France quickly rose to 300,000 a week. The vouchers disappeared by the end of the 1960s.

=== The 1950s ===
In the 1950s new artists and series showed up:

- Tibet with his humorous western Chick Bill and his detective series Ric Hochet
- Raymond Macherot, with his fantasy series Chlorophylle and detective series Clifton
- Maurice Maréchal - Prudence Petitpas.
- Jean Graton with Michel Vaillant
- Albert Uderzo and René Goscinny with Oumpah-pah

The magazine became more and more international and successful: at one time, there were separate versions for France, Switzerland, Canada, Belgium and the Netherlands, with about 600,000 copies a week. The magazine had increased to 32 pages, and a cheaper version was created as well: Chez Nous (in French) / Ons Volkske (in Dutch), printed on cheaper paper and featuring mainly reprints from Tintin magazine, plus some new series by Tibet and Studio Vandersteen.

=== The 1960s ===
In the 1960s the magazine kept on attracting new artists. The editorial line was clearly bent towards humor, with Greg (as editor-in-chief and author of series such as the remake of Zig et Puce), Jo-El Azara (with Taka Takata), Dany (with Olivier Rameau) and Dupa (with Cubitus). Other authors joined the magazine, like William Vance (with Ringo and Bruno Brazil) and Hermann (with Bernard Prince).

=== The 1970s ===
In the 1970s the comics scene in France and Belgium went through important changes. The mood for magazines had declined in favor of albums in the late 1960s. In 1965, Greg was appointed chief editor. He transformed the editorial line, in order to keep the pace with the new way of thinking of the time. The characters gained psychological dimensions, real women characters appeared, and sex. New foreign artists series were added to the magazine. Moralizing articles and long biographies disappeared as well. These transformations were crowned with success, leading to the Yellow Kid prize at the Lucca comics festival, awarded to the magazine in 1972 for the best publication of the year. Greg quit his chief editor position in 1974.

The major new authors in the 1970s were:

- Derib (Buddy Longway)
- Franz (Jugurtha)
- Cosey (Jonathan)
- Gilles Chaillet (Vasco)
- Jean-Claude Servais
- Hugo Pratt (Corto Maltese)
- Will Eisner (The Spirit)

And more in the humor vein:

- Turk & De Groot with Robin Dubois

=== The 1980s and 1990s ===
The 1980s showed a steady decline of popularity of Tintin magazine, with different short-lived attempts to attract a new audience. Adolescents and adults preferred the magazine À Suivre, if they read comics at all, and younger children seemed less inclined to read comic magazines and preferred albums. Still, some important new authors and series started, including Grzegorz Rosiński, with Thorgal, and Andreas, with Rork. At the end of 1980, the Belgian edition was cancelled, leaving the French edition remaining.

In 1988, the circulation of the French version had dropped to 100,000, and when the contract between the Hergé family and Raymond Leblanc finished, the name was changed to Tintin Reporter. Alain Baran, a friend of Hergé, tried to revive the magazine in December 1992. The magazine disappeared after six months, leaving behind a financial disaster. The circulation of the magazine dropped dramatically, and publication of the Dutch version Kuifje ceased in 1992, and the French version, renamed Hello Bédé, finally disappeared in 1993.

== International editions ==
- A Portuguese version was published between 1968 and 1983.
- A Greek version existed during 1969–1972.
- An Egyptian version existed from 1971 to 1980.

== Spirou and Tintin rivalry ==
From the beginning, Tintin magazine was in competition with Spirou magazine. As part of a gentlemen's agreement between the two publishers, Raymond Leblanc of Le Lombard and Charles Dupuis of Dupuis, if one artist was published by one of the magazines, he would not be published by the other one. One notable exception, however, was André Franquin, who in 1955, after a dispute with his editor, moved from the more popular Spirou to Tintin. The dispute was quickly settled, but by then Franquin had signed an agreement with Tintin for five years. He created Modeste et Pompon for Tintin while pursuing work for Spirou. He quit Tintin at the end of his contract. Some artists moved from Spirou to Tintin like Eddy Paape and Liliane & Fred Funcken, while some went from Tintin to Spirou like Raymond Macherot and Berck.

== Main authors and series ==
- Édouard Aidans: Tounga (1961–1985), Bob Binn (1960–1977), Marc Franval (1963–1974)
- Andreas: Rork (1978–1993)
- Dino Attanasio: Signor Spaghetti (1957–1978), Modeste et Pompon, (1959–1968)
- Jo-El Azara: Taka Takata (1965–1980)
- Bara: Max L'Explorateur (1968–1975), Cro-Magnon (1974–1993)
- Berck: Strapontin (1958–1968)
- Gordon Bess: Redeye (1969–1990)
- Bom: Julie, Claire, Cécile et les autres... (1982–1993)
- Cosey: Jonathan (1975–1986)
- François Craenhals: Le Chevalier Ardent (1966–1986), Pom et Teddy (1953–1968)
- Paul Cuvelier: Corentin (1946–1984, sporadically)
- Dany: Olivier Rameau (1968–1988)
- Bob de Groot: Clifton (1970–1990), Robin Dubois (1969–1986)
- Bob de Moor: Barelli (1950–1986, sporadically), Professeur Tric (1950–1979)
- Christian Denayer: Alain Chevalier (1976–1985), Casseurs (1975–1990)
- Derib: Buddy Longway (1972–1987), Go West (1971–1978), Yakari (1978–1982)
- André-Paul Duchâteau: Ric Hochet (1959–1992), Chick Bill (1965–1970)
- Dupa: Cubitus (1968–1993), Chlorophylle (1971–1983)
- André Franquin: Modeste et Pompon (1955–1959)
- Fred and Liliane Funcken: Various historical comics (1952–1988)
- Géri: Mr. Magellan (1969–1979)
- Christian Godard: Martin Milan (1967–1984)
- René Goscinny: Oumpa-Pah (1958–1962), Signor Spaghetti (1957–1978)
- Jean Graton: Michel Vaillant (1957–1976)
- Greg: Zig, Puce et Alfred (1963–1969), Bernard Prince (1966–1985), Chick Bill (1958–1987) etc.
- Hachel: Benjamin (1969–1980)
- Hergé: The Adventures of Tintin (1946–1966, 1975), Jo, Zette et Jocko (1946–1954), Quick et Flupke (1947–1955)
- Hermann: Bernard Prince (1966–1980), Comanche (1969–1982)
- Edgar Pierre Jacobs: Blake et Mortimer (1946–1972, 1990)
- Raymond Macherot: Chlorophylle (1954–1966), Clifton (1959–1963)
- Maurice Maréchal: Prudence Petitpas (1957–1969)
- Jacques Martin: Alix (1948–1985), Lefranc (1952–1982, sporadically)
- Mittéï: Indésirable Désiré (1960–1977), 3A (1962–1967), Modeste et Pompon (1965–1975)
- Mouminoux: Rififi (1970–1980)
- Eddy Paape: Luc Orient (1967–1984)
- Raymond Reding: Jari (1957–1978), Section R (1971–1979)
- Grzegorz Rosinski: Thorgal (1977–1992), Hans (1980–1993)
- Sidney: Julie, Claire, Cécile et les autres... (1982–1993)
- Tibet: Ric Hochet (1955–1992), Chick Bill (1955–1993)
- Turk: Clifton (1970–1983), Robin Dubois (1969–1986)
- Albert Uderzo: Oumpah-pah (1958–1962)
- Jean Van Hamme: Thorgal (1977–1992)
- William Vance: Bruno Brazil (1967–1983), Bob Morane (1975–1993)
- Willy Vandersteen: Bob et Bobette (1948–1958, 1981), Altesse Riri (1953–1960)
- Vicq: Taka Takata (1965–1980)
- Albert Weinberg: Dan Cooper (1954–1977)
- Weyland: Aria (1980–1992)
