= André-Paul Duchâteau =

Belgian writer (1925–2020)

- Born: 8 May 1925; Tournai, Belgium
- Died: 26 August 2020 (aged 95); Uccle, Belgium
- Occupations: comics writer, mystery novelist

André-Paul Duchâteau (8 May 1925 – 26 August 2020) was a Belgian comics writer and mystery novelist.

== Biography ==
He worked with Tibet on the detective comics series Ric Hochet and the more humoristic western comic Chick Bill. He also wrote under the pseudonym Michel Vasseur. Duchâteau additionally wrote several detective novels and radio plays. As a dramatist he is most famous for his play 5 à 7 Avec La Mort (1960), which has been adapted into various media.

Duchâteau died on 26 August 2020.

== Awards ==
- 1974: Grand Prix de Littérature Policière – French Prize
- 2003: Prix Saint-Michel – Best story
- 2010: Grand Prix Saint-Michel

== Works ==
- Hans (comic book)
