= Bob Morane (disambiguation) =

Bob Morane is a series of adventure books by Henri Vernes about the hero of the same name.

Bob Morane also refers to:

- Bob Morane (1965 TV series)
- Bob Morane (1998 TV series)
- Bob Morane (video game series)
- Bob Morane (comics)

== See also ==
- Robert and Léon Morane, French aviation pioneers
- Bob Moran, British cartoonist
