= René Follet =

Belgian illustrator and comics artist (1931–2020)

- Born: 10 April 1931 Brussels, Belgium
- Died: 13 March 2020 (aged 88) Brussels, Belgium
- Area: artist
- Pseudonym: Ref
- Notable works: Les Zingari; Yvan Zourine; Steve Severin; Terreur
- Awards: full list

René Follet (10 April 1931 – 13 March 2020), sometimes known by the pen name Ref, was a Belgian illustrator, comics writer and artist.

== Biography ==
René Follet was born in Brussels in 1931. His first publication appeared when he was 14, illustrating a promotional issue of Robert Louis Stevenson's Treasure Island for Aiglon, a chocolate factory. In 1949, he started working for the two main Franco-Belgian comics magazines of that time, Tintin and Spirou. For both, he collaborated on the series of 4-page historical stories which functioned as a starting point for many young artists like Jean Graton and Hermann Huppen. He also provided numerous illustrations for both magazines, as well as books for Casterman publishing.

In his long cartooning career, spanning over 50 years, Follet never had a long-running or particularly successful series, but his many shorter series and one-shots earned him the acclaim of many of his peers. He worked for the Dutch magazine Eppo, and for the major publishing houses in Belgium and France, including Dupuis, Le Lombard, and Glénat. He also worked as the main penciller for artists Mitacq and William Vance, and made a long promotional comic for Citroën. At the beginning of his career, he was asked by Edgar Pierre Jacobs to help him draw Blake and Mortimer, but Follet refused because Jacobs did not want Follet's name to be included in the credits.

As an illustrator he worked in pencil, acrylic, and other materials, and as a cartoonist was considered a master of the realistic and picturesque drawing style, or as he was dubbed, "the 'most famous unknown' great master of the 9th art".

His major influences were Jijé, whose series Valhardi he continued for two albums, and the Dutch comics artist Hans G. Kresse (known for his American Indian series 'Les Peaux-Rouges' published by Casterman).

Follet died at the age of 88 on 13 March 2020.

== Bibliography ==
=== Comics ===
| Series | Years | Volumes | Writer | Editor | Remarks |
|---|---|---|---|---|---|
| Bruno Brazil | 1973–1977 | 5 | Greg | Magic-Strip | William Vance drew the comics, Follet provided the page lay-out |
| Ivan Zourine | 1979 | 2 | Jacques Stoquart | Magic-Strip | |
| Steve Severin | 1981–2003 | 9 | Jacques Stoquart and Yvan Delporte | Glénat | 3 in French - 6 additional in Dutch |
| L'Iliade | 1982 | 1 | Jacques Stoquart | Glénat | Adapted from the Ilias by Homer |
| Jacques Le Gall | 1984–1985 | 2 | Jean-Michel Charlier | Dupuis | A collaboration with MiTacq |
| Valhardi | 1984–1986 | 2 | Jacques Stoquart and André-Paul Duchâteau | Dupuis | Continuation of the series after Jijé and Eddy Paape |
| Alain Brisant | 1985 | 1 | Maurice Tillieux | Dupuis | |
| Edmund Bell | 1987–1990 | 4 | Jacques Stoquart and Martin Lodewijk | Cl. Lefrancq | Based on the stories by John Flanders (Jean Ray) |
| Daddy | 1991-92 | 2 | Loup Durand | Cl. Lefrancq | |
| Bob Morane | 1991–2000 | 3 | Henri Vernes | Nautilus and Claude Lefrancq | Follet drew one story in 2000, and made the cover art for two others (drawn by Gerald Forton) |
| Harricana | 1992 | 1 | Jean-Claude de la Royère | Claude Lefrancq | Drawn by Denis Mérezette, Follet did the page lay-out |
| Marshall Blueberry | 1994 | 1 | Jean Giraud | Alpen | Drawn by William Vance, Follet did the page lay-out |
| Ikar | 1995–1997 | 2 | Pierre Makyo | Glénat | |
| Les autos de l'aventure | 1996–1998 | 2 | De la Royère | Citroën | Promotional comics |
| Terreur | 2002–2004 | 2 | André-Paul Duchâteau | Le Lombard | Fictional biography of Madame Tussaud |
| Les Zingari | 2004–2005 | 2 | Yvan Delporte | Hibou | |
| Shelena | 2005 | 1 | Jéromine Pasteur | Casterman | |
| L'étoile du soldat | 2007 | 1 | Christophe De Ponfilly | Casterman | Announced (28 August 2007) |
| L'affaire Dominici | 2010 | 1 | Pascal Bresson | Glénat | |

=== Book illustrations ===
According to Follet, illustrations are too short in comics; so he also illustrated novels or history books :

- 1949 : Treasure Island by Robert Louis Stevenson
- 1962 : The Last of the Mohicans by James Fenimore Cooper (Golden Pleasure Books)
- 1962 : The Silver Skates by Mary Mapes Dodge
- 1965 : The Wonderful Life of the Uganda Martyrs by P.Laridan (G. Chapman Editor)
- 1967–1969 : Les Grecs, La chevallerie, Cordées Souterraines (Dupuis editor)
- 1980 : Tom Sawyer Abroad by Mark Twain
- 1983–1986 : Petite histoire de France, Guerres de Vendées, Colonnies françaises with Henri Servien (ed. de Chiré)
- 1988 : Searching for Tutankhamun by Francis Youssef (Blake and Mortimer Editor for Edgar P. Jacobs)
- several covers for Henri Vernes's novels (Lefrancq editor)

He also worked:

- in Scouts de France with Pierre Joubert (illustrator of boys' adventure novels, particularly the Signe de Piste (Trail Sign) line)
- in Plein Jeu for Belgian scouting publications
- in White Fathers publications : Caravane, John Bosco, Charles de Foucauld, Charles Lavigerie...
- in Spirou magazine and its supplement Le trombone illustré with Mitacq and Franquin
- in Tintin magazine: Rocky Bill with Yves Duval, Texas Slim from Paul Cuvelier, Samourai of black sun and Hurricane at West with Jean-Michel Charlier
- in Bonnes Soirées with Jijé (The Count of Monte Cristo by Alexandre Dumas, père...)
- in Pep and Eppo (two Dutch magazines): (The Call of the Wild by Jack London...)
- with William Vance for Bob Morane and Bruno Brazil

== Awards ==
- 1975: Revelation of the year at the Prix Saint-Michel, Brussels
- 1998: Tournesol Award, for Ikar 2 at the Angoulême International Comics Festival, France
- 2003: Grand Prix for drawing of the Chambre belge des Experts en Bande Dessinée (Belgian Chamber of Comics Experts)
- 2006: Nominated for the best artwork at the Prix Saint-Michel

== Sources ==
- Béra, Michel; Denni, Michel; and Mellot, Philippe (2002): "Trésors de la Bande Dessinée 2003-2004". Paris, Les éditions de l'amateur. ISBN 2-85917-357-9
- Peeters Jozef (2006) : René Follet, un rêveur sédentaire (éd.l'Age d'Or)
- René Follet publications in Belgian Tintin, French Tintin and Spirou BDoubliées (in French)
- René Follet albums Bedetheque (in French)

Footnotes
