= Jacques Acar (writer) =

Belgian comics artist (1937–1976)

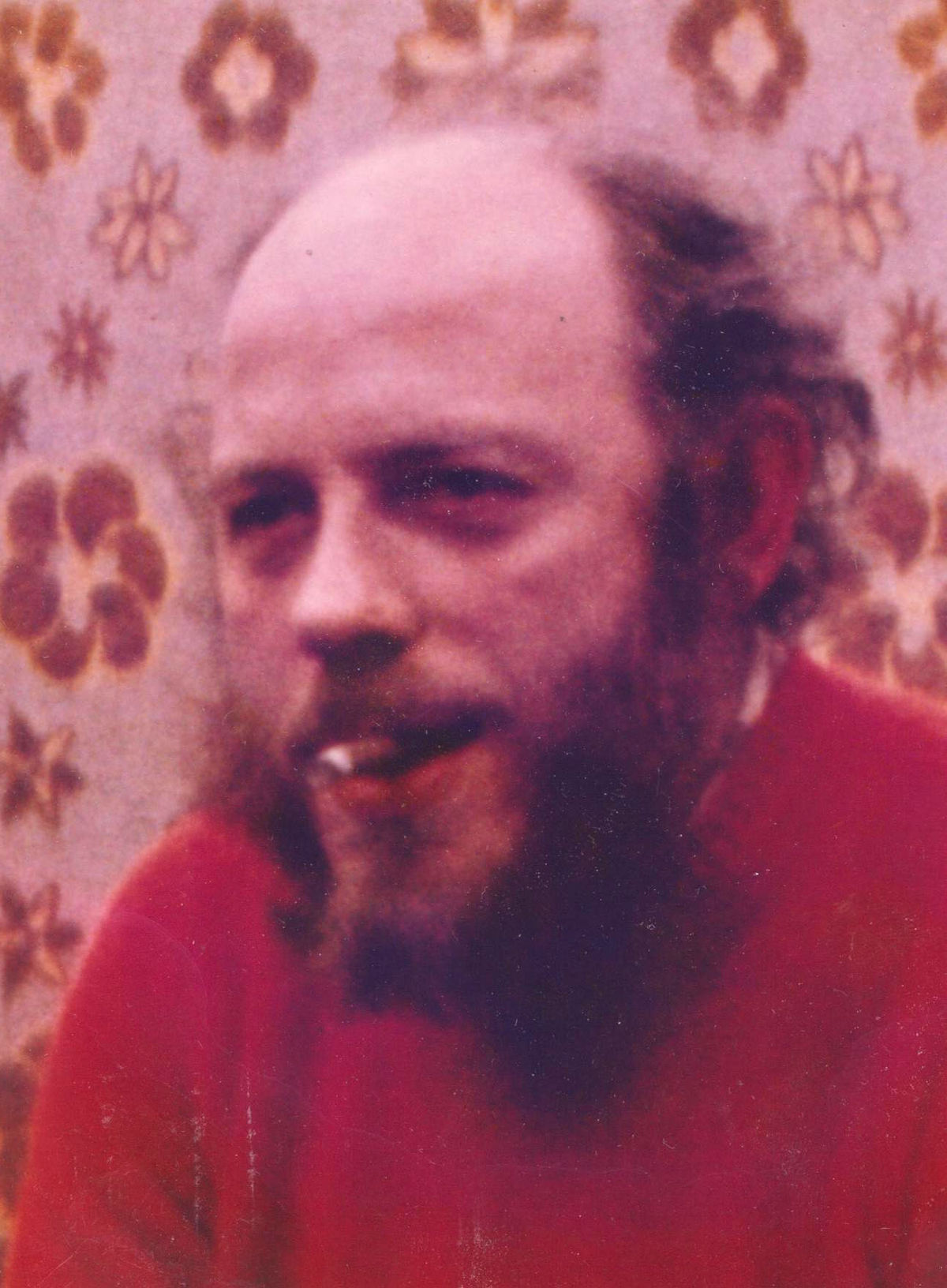
- Born: Jacques Acar; 14 March 1937; Boussu, Belgium
- Died: 21 January 1976 (aged 38); Leuze-en-Hainaut, Belgium
- Occupations: Comic book writer, scriptwriter, journalist
- Years active: 14
- Notable work: Tintin, fr:Strapontin

Jacques Acar (14 March 1937 – 21 January 1976), was a Belgian comic book writer and journalist. He is best known as being a pillar of Tintin and Strapontin from 1962 to 1975 working alongside René Goscinny, and was an author "Représentatif de la bande dessinée Franco-Belge classique".

== Biography ==
At the age of 25, Jacques Acar began his career in professional comics as a writer, writing short stories for Tintin. From 1963, he became a supporting scriptwriter for the house authors: collaborating with fr:Édouard Aidans (Marc Franval, Tounga and other stories), fr:William Vance in 1966 (Ringo), and fr:Paul Cuvelier (Wapi, Corentin) . In the early 1960s, with Hugo Fonske, Acar created many comics for fr:Kuifje (the Flemish version of Tintin), Ons Volkske, Pat and fr:Het Nieuwsblad.

In the late 1960s, Acar also worked for Line, Record (mainly with Jim Steward on Stanley, Catriona MacKilligan with Claude Auclair, etc.) and Pilote, providing stories for Joseph Loeckx (also known under the pseudonym of Jo-El Azara), Jipo-Max and Géri.

In the early 1970s, he adapted Tounga, Bernard Prince, Bruno Brazil and Les Panthères for Tintin Sélection into novels. Acar has also published science fiction novels, including two at Fleuve Noir, in the "Anticipation" collection, under the pseudonym of Vincent Gallaix.

== Published works ==
=== Print and press ===
- Rataplan, Yves Duval et Jacques Acar (scénario), Berck (dessinateur), 1961–1967
- Nouvelles et divers scénarios de récits courts, 1962–1970
- Joly et Mathurin le pirate, avec Hugo, 1963
- Bob Binn, avec Édouard Aidans, 1963–1965
- Marc Franval : Marc Franval chasse le condor, avec Édouard Aidans, 1963
- Céleste Pion, avec Hugo, 1964–1965
- Bôjolet, avec Mazel, 1964
- Cinq histoires à suivre de Strapontin, avec Berck, 1965–1968
- Deux histoires à suivre de Ringo, avec William Vance, 1966
- Corentin : Le signe du cobra, avec Paul Cuvelier, 1967
- Gomez et Gonzalez : Les Plumes des conquistadors, avec Ramboux, 1975

==== Other print and press ====
- Divers scénarios de récits courts dans Pilote, Dargaud, 1965–1966
- M. Chapomou, avec Jo-El Azara, dans Pilote, 1965–1966
- Poncyffe, avec Van Overloop, dans Pilote, 1965–1966
- Picratte, avec Géri, dans Pilote, 1966
- Jim Steward, avec Sidney, dans Record, 1970

=== Albums ===
- Strapontin (scénario), avec Berck (dessin), Le Lombard, coll. « Jeune Europe » :

5. Révolte au bois dormant, avec René Goscinny (coscénario), 1966
6. Strapontin et le BCZ 2, 1967
7. Strapontin plus un zeste de violence, 1972
8. Strapontin et le rayon alimentaire, 1973

- Ringo, avec William Vance, Dargaud / Le Lombard, coll. « Jeune Europe » :
1. Piste pour Santa Fe, 1967
2. Le Serment de Gettysburg, 1968

Ces deux volumes ont été repris dans Tout Vance t. 9 : L'intégrale Ringo (deuxième partie), Le Lombard, 2004

- Tounga t. 3 : Tounga et le Dieu du feu, avec Édouard Aidans, Le Lombard, coll. « Une Histoire du Journal Tintin », 1968. Rééd. comme tome 7 de l'édition cartonnée, 1978.
- Corentin t. 5 : Le Signe du cobra, avec Paul Cuvelier, Le Lombard, 1969
- Marc Franval t. 8 : Marc Franval chasse le condor, avec Édouard Aidans, Le Lombard, coll. « Vedette », 1973
- Tommy Banco t. 3 : Tir sans sommation, avec Jean Roze (coscénario) et Eddy Paape (dessin), Bédéscope, 1979
- Jim Steward, avec Sidney, Hibou, coll. « Traits pour traits », 2006

=== Science fiction novels (under the pseudonym Vincent Gallaix) ===
- Orbite d'attente, Fleuve noir, coll. « Anticipation » no 708, 1975
- Zoomby, Fleuve noir, coll. « Anticipation » no 719, 1976
