= Jacques Acar =

Jacques Acar may refer to:

- Jacques F. Acar (1931–2020), French doctor and microbiologist
- Jacques Acar (writer) (1937–1976), Belgian comic book writer and journalist
