= Corentin (comics) =

Comic series by Paul Cuvelier

- Main character Corentin Feldoë with the logo of the series
- Author(s): Paul Cuvelier, Greg, Jacques Acar, Jean Van Hamme
- Illustrator(s): Paul Cuvelier, Nadine Forster, Christophe Simon
- Current status/schedule: Discontinued
- Launch date: 1946
- End date: 2016
- Publisher: Le Lombard
- Genre: Adventure

Corentin is a series of comics created by Belgian artist Paul Cuvelier (1923–1978). Influenced by Robinson Crusoe, Cuvelier created the character of Corentin Feldoë in 1943. The character first appeared in a series of watercolors that Cuvelier made for his own family. Hergé, convinced of the merit of these watercolors, commissioned Cuvelier to do a series of comic strips. Thus, Corentin first made its appearance in Tintin magazine on September 26, 1946. Originally, the final story was published in 1974, four years before Cuvelier's death. 42 years later, a new album was published, written by Jean Van Hamme.

== Story ==
At the end of the 18th century, Corentin Feldoë, an orphan of Breton origin, decides to flee the house of his uncle, an inveterate drunkard who has been abusing him. Corentin runs off to sea, only to be shipwrecked onto a desert island. Corentin befriends a gorilla named Belzébuth and a tiger named Moloch, and subsequently befriends Kim, an Indian boy, and Sa-Skya, a beautiful princess.

=== Western-themed story ===
Seeing the need for a Western-themed comic in Tintin, editor Raymond Leblanc asked Cuvelier to shift the focus of Corentin in 1949. Cuvelier situated his new adventures in the Wild West but made the hero a grandson of the original Corentin.

== Albums ==
1. Les Extraordinaires Aventures de Corentin (1950)
2. Les Nouvelles Aventures de Corentin (1952)
3. Corentin chez les Peaux-Rouges (1956)
4. Le Poignard magique (1963)
5. Le Signe du cobra (1969)
6. Le Prince des sables (1970)
7. Le Royaume des eaux noires (1974)
8. Les trois perles de Sa-Skya (2016)

== Animated series ==
In 1993 Media-Films TV and Saban International Paris made an animated TV series about the comic called Les Voyages de Corentin. Raymond Leblanc envisioned this project since 1987. The series consisted of 26 episodes of 25 minutes each and was broadcast on Canal+, France 3 and the RTBF. It was broadcast in English as Journey to the Heart of the World.
