= Claude Titre =

French actor

- Born: 30 December 1930; Rabat, Morocco
- Died: 29 January 1985 (aged 54); Paris, France
- Occupations: Actor; film producer

Claude Titre (30 December 1930 – 29 January 1985) was a French actor. Titre is best known for portraying fictional character Bob Morane in the 1965 TV series.

== Filmography ==
Year	Title	Role	Notes
1958	Le insaziabili	Michel Mortier	
1959	Bal de nuit	Gil	
1959	La nuit des traqués	Michel - le fiancé	
1960	Le cercle vicieux	Sacha	
1961	The Triumph of Michael Strogoff	Igor Vassiliev	
1962	La Salamandre d'or	François 1er	
1964-1965	Bob Morane	Bob Morane	26 episodes
1965	Här börjar äventyret	Jacques	
1966	Une femme en blanc se révolte	Dr Vincent Ferrière	
1969	Les gommes	Wallas	
1970	La maison des Bories	Ludovic	
