= Bob Morane =

Media franchise about a French spy

- Cover of L'oiseau de feu (1960) by Attanasio
- Created by: Henri Vernes

Print publications
- Comics: Graphic novels

Films and television
- Film(s): film
- Television series: Live action series
- Animated series: animated series

Games
- Video game(s): video game series

Miscellaneous

Bob Morane (French pronunciation: [bɔb mɔʁan]) is a series of adventure books in French, featuring an eponymous protagonist, created by French-speaking Belgian novelist Henri Vernes, the pseudonym of Charles-Henri Dewisme. More than 200 novels have been written since his introduction in 1953, the iconic covers illustrated by artists such as Pierre Joubert, Henri Lievens, William Vance, Claude Pascal, Antonio Parras, Patrice Sanahujas, Felicísimo Coria and René Follet.

The popularity of Bob Morane led to his subsequent appearance in a 1960 film (now lost), a television series in 1965, a computer game in 1988, a 1998 animated series, and a long-running series of graphic novels (roughly 80 books since 1959) which has featured the artwork of artists such as Dino Attanasio, Gérald Forton, William Vance and Felicísimo Coria.

== Synopsis ==
The novels, which started as straight adventure fare, quickly included elements of espionage, crime fiction, science-fiction and fantasy. Bob Morane, a Frenchman, was a young volunteer RAF pilot during World War II (ranking from flight-lieutenant to wing commander depending on the translation of the term "flying commander"). He is the most highly decorated officer of the FFAL (Forces françaises aériennes libres or Free French Air Force) under Gen. Charles de Gaulle. This would put him above Pierre Clostermann (actual FFAL top ranking pilot from whom Morane was probably copied). He was wounded in action by flak and has a scar on his face.

After the war, he becomes a full-time explorer and freelance reporter for Reflets magazine and adventurer. 6 ft 1 in-tall (185 cm) and athletic, Morane is proficient in many forms of hand-to-hand combat (Karaté black belt 2nd degree, Ju-Jitsu and Judo) as well as with many weapons (marksman). He speaks a wide variety of languages and most books usually start with him traveling to some exotic location. His adventures over the years brought him in contact with numerous highly placed figures of the world's intelligence community (Herbert Gains (Central Intelligence Agency), Lt. Gros-Jean (Royal Canadian Mounted Police), Sir Archibald Baywater (Scotland Yard), who often ask him for help in some difficult business or other. He is described as a modern-day knight without fear or reproach, always ready to succor the needy and the oppressed as a modern Don Quixote (especially if they happen to be young ladies in distress, which apparently is often the case). Morane is however described as being as chaste as Sir Galahad.

As seen in a few stories with a heavy science-fiction slant, Morane is a sometimes agent of the Time Patrol, an organization from Earth's future that polices the time stream and stops time travelers from disrupting history.

Morane's close associates include (in French) Bill Ballantine, a herculean Scotsman who acted as Morane's aircraft mechanic in New Guinea (first novel); professor Aristide Clairembart, an old but energetic French archeologist; Sophia Paramount, a British journalist; Frank Reeves, an American worth more than a billion dollars; Herbert Gains, head of the CIA; and many others.

Morane's path has on many occasions crossed that of the series' main villain, Mister Ming, also called (in French) Ombre Jaune (″The Yellow Shadow"). Ming is a Mongol genius in the mold of Fu Manchu. Like Sax Rohmer's creation, Ming intends to destroy western civilisation and replace it with a world more in harmony with nature. Also like Fu Manchu, Ming uses violent means to reach his goals — means which include assassination, terrorism, as well as too many strange plots to be counted. Ming has pierced the secrets of eternal life, of creating androids, and of time travel.

Despite Morane's constant opposition, Ming holds his enemy in high regard, and never forgets he actually saved his life during their first encounter: his hand cut off by a deadly trap hidden in an ancient statue, Ming was bleeding to death but Morane cauterized the wound and made a tourniquet. In return, Ming decided to spare Morane's life this one time and gave him a medallion that allowed him to pass by his Dacoits (one of Ming's many minions), who were guarding the temple waiting to kill him. However, Ming's medallion would prove useful in many occasions in later adventures.

Other recurring opponents include (in French) Miss Ylang-Ylang, head of the spy agency S.M.O.G.; (in French) Roman Orgonetz a.k.a. "The Man With The Golden Teeth"; "Callaverde"; "Arthur Greenstreet", a highly intelligent and dedicated but deadly spy for hire but often associated with S.M.O.G.; and Dr. Xathan, the self-styled "Master of Light".

== Books ==
1. Bob Moran and the Buccaneer's Hoard, [L'héritage du flibustier] pp. 158. Phoenix House: London, 1957, Roy Publishers: New York, 1958.
2. Bob Moran and the Fawcett Mystery, [Sur la piste de Fawcett] pp. 158. Phoenix House: London, 1956, Roy Publishers: New York, 1958.
3. Bob Moran and the Fiery Claw, [La griffe de feu] pp. 157. Phoenix House: London; Roy Publishers: New York, 1960.
4. Bob Moran and the Pirates of the Air, [Panique dans le ciel] pp. 159. Phoenix House: London, 1956, Roy Publishers: New York, 1958.
5. Bob Moran and the Sunken Galley, [La Galère engloutie] pp. 159. Phoenix House: London, 1957, Roy Publishers: New York, 1958.
6. Bob Moran in the Valley of Hell, La Vallée infernale pp. 160. Phoenix House: London 1960, Roy Publishers: New York, 1960.
7. The dinosaur hunters, [Les Chasseurs de dinosaures] pp. 126. Translated by Jean Ure. Transworld, London, 1966.
8. The yellow shadow, [L'ombre jaune] pp. 127. Translated by Jean Ure. Transworld, London, 1966.
9. City of a thousand drums, [Trafic aux Caraïbes] pp. 126. Translated by Jean Ure. Transworld, London, 1966.
10. The white gorilla, [Le gorille blanc] pp. 128. Translated by Jean Ure. Transworld, London, 1967.
11. Operation parrot, [La voix du mainate] pp. 127. Translated by Jean Ure. Transworld, London, 1968.
12. Treasure of the Golcondas, [La Couronne de Golconde] pp. 128. Translated by Jean Ure. Transworld, London, 1967.

== Other media ==
- The first Bob Morane film was produced in 1960 by Belgavidéo. The spy with the hundred faces, with Jacques Santi cast as Bob Morane, screened only once on Sunday January 8, 1961, at the Scala cinema of Brussels and is regarded as lost following the destruction of the single copy during the fire of Belgavidéo.
- A 1965 French TV series was produced named Bob Morane. Certain episodes were adaptations of classic stories, others were original scenarios.
- A 1998 animated series named Bob Morane was produced by Canal+ and France 3.

Bob Morane in animated series

- Bob Morane inspired the 1982 song "L'Aventurier" by French group Indochine, since covered by the bands The Kingpins in 2000, and Nada Surf in 2003.
- Multiple video games bearing the Bob Morane name were produced in the 80s and early 90s, for the Atari 1040 ST, the Amiga 500 and the Commodore 64. These included Bob Morane: Ocean, Bob Morane: Moon, Bob Morane: Jungle and Bob Morane: Chevalerie, all of them developed and published by Infogrames of France. These games were usually of a high artistic quality, but largely obscure in their mechanics.

== Comics ==
There exist more than 80 Bande Dessinée comics stories of Bob Morane, serialised, published in albums and republished in integral editions. 5 comics artists have illustrated the series over more than 40 years, under several publisher labels.

The first comics artist was Dino Attanasio who from 1959 to 1962 illustrated the first 5 stories which were published in Femmes d’Aujourd’hui. The first album was released in 1960. Gerald Forton took over the series in 1962, as it continued publication in Femmes d'Aujourd'hui, Pilote magazine, and Het Laatste Nieuws. René Follet who illustrated covers for the early novels, also illustrated the covers for the albums drawn by Forton.

Forton was succeeded by William Vance in 1969 as Bob Morane left Pilote and continued its serial run in Tintin magazine. After 10 years, Vance passed the task on to his previous assistant Felicísimo Coria in 1979, who has continued to draw the series since. Two albums have been issued by the publisher Ananké/Milko with artwork by Frank Leclerq.

The comics of Bob Marone are a parody of Bob Morane.

== Sources ==
- Bob Morane bibliography coolfrenchcomics
- Bob Morane publications in Pilote, Belgian Tintin Archived 2007-03-26 at the Wayback Machine and French Tintin Archived 2007-07-06 at the Wayback Machine BDoubliées (in French)

Footnotes
