= Paul Ramboux =

Belgian cartoonist (1932–2023)

- Born: 1932; Belgium
- Died: 5 October 2023 (aged 91)
- Education: Institut Saint-Luc
- Occupation: Cartoonist

Paul Ramboux (1932 – 5 October 2023), known by the pseudonyms Sidney, Kovak, and Malois, was a Belgian comics artist.

Ramboux was known for the series Julie, Claire, Cécile and for his work with Tintin during the 1960s.

== Biography ==
Born in Belgium in 1932, Ramboux attended the Institut Saint-Luc and subsequently took on the pseudonym Sidney when he joined Tintin. He released his first comics alongside author Yves Duval. He published humorous comics for Junior. He also worked for Spirou under the pseudonyms Kovak and Malois. He published approximately 16 collections of L'oncle Paul. He also published short stories on the American Civil War for Record.

In 1982, Ramboux returned to Tintin with the series Julie, Claire, Cécile, a trio of young girls in a semi-realistic world, which he produced with screenwriter Michel de Bom.

Paul Ramboux died on 5 October 2023, at the age of 91.

== Works ==
=== Julie, Claire, Cécile ===
- Moi, tu sais, les mecs !…
- Hé ! T'as vu celui-là !
- Moi, et moi, émois !
- On s'éclate !
- C'est la jungle !
- C'est quand les vacances ?
- La Disparue !
- À plein cœur !
- La Poudre cachée
- Ça passe ou ça casse !
- Odyssée dingue
- S.O.S. filles !
- Ils n'ont encore rien vu !
- Ces filles sont folles !
- Opération Showbiz
- À la vie, à l'amour !
- Dis-moi que tu m'aimes !
- Ça va, les filles ?
- Trop, c'est too much !
- Mecs plus ultra
- Les Amis de mes amies
- Ainsi sont-elles !
- Ton mec à moi !
- Cinq ans après

=== Jim Steward ===
- Jim Steward (2006)
- Jim Steward : L'Héritage de Jim Steward - Cour martialle - Les Frères ennemis (2013)
- Le Convoi (2017)

=== Gomez et Gonzalez ===
- Les Plumes des conquistadores (2016)

=== Collectives ===
- 2 Parodies 2 - ... par leurs vrais auteurs ! (1988)
- Téléthon (1990)
- Super BD vacances (1996)
