= Yves Duval =

Belgian comics creator (1934–2009)

- Born: Yves Duval; 21 March 1934 Etterbeek, Belgium
- Died: 22 May 2009 (aged 75)
- Area: writer

Yves Duval (21 March 1934 – 22 May 2009) was a Belgian comics author who mainly worked for Tintin magazine, but also wrote comics, stories, and articles for other magazines.

== Biography ==
Yves Duval was born in Etterbeek. He started working for Tintin magazine when he was 16, writing short stories for a number of authors like Raymond Reding. He would eventually write about 1500 4-page true stories as Tintin's reaction against L'oncle Paul which appeared in Spirou magazine. Among the many artists who illustrated these comics are well-known names like Paul Cuvelier, Jean Graton, René Follet, Hermann, Eddy Paape, Jean-Claude Servais, and Jo-El Azara.

His first longer comic was an adaptation of David Balfour by Robert Louis Stevenson, with artwork by Jacques Laudy. He also wrote longer stories for Berck, for whom he created the series Rataplan, Howard Flynn for William Vance, Johnny Goodbye for Dino Attanasio, Doc Silver for Liliane and Fred Funcken and many more.

He wrote his memoirs 55 ans de bulles in 2008, and died in 2009.

== Bibliography ==
- Alerte aux pirates, art by Hermann, 1 album, 1980, Bédéscope
- Arthur au royaume de l'impossible, art by Philippe Delaby, 1 album, Le Lombard, 1991
- Candida, art by Dino Attanasio, 1 album, 2006, Miklo
- Le Croissant et la croix, art by Liliane and Fred Funcken, 1 album, 1985, Le Lombard
- Les Dalton, art by Hermann, 1 album, 1980, Bédéscope
- David Balfour, art by Jacques laudy, 1 album, 1980, Distri BD
- Doc Silver, art by Liliane and Fred Funcken, 5 albums, 1968-1974, Le Lombard
- Les Fabuleux Exploits d'Eddy Merckx, art by Christian Lippens, 1 album, 1973, Arts & Voyages Gamma
- Flamberge au vent, art by Liliane and Fred Funcken, 1 album, 2008, Hibou
- Flash-Back et la 4e dimension, art by Dino Attanasio, 1 album, 1979, Michel Deligne
- Les Franval, art by Edouard Aidans, 12 albums, 1966-1980, Le Lombard, Dargaud and Bédéscope
- Graine de jockey, art by Franz Drappier, 1 album, 1973, Rossel
- Les Grandes catastrophes, art by Ferry, 1 album, 1984, Le Lombard
- Hassan et Kadour, art by Jacques laudy, 1 album, 1978, Bédéscope
- Howard Flynn, art by William Vance, 3 albums, 1966-1969, Le Lombard
- Johnny Goodbye, art by Dino Attanasio, 2 albums, 1984-1986, Archers
- Justine, art by Edouard Aidans, 1 albums, 2007, Dupuis
- Ken Krom, art by Berck, 1 album, 2010, BD Must
- Kenton, art by Berck, 1 album, 2010, BD Must
- Lady Bound, art by Berck, 1 album, 2010, BD Must
- Lieutenant Burton, art by Liliane and Fred Funcken, 1 album, 1980, Jonas
- Les Meilluers recits de ..., art by various artists, 27 albums, 2002-..., Hibou
- La Prodigieuse épopée du Tour de France, art by Marc Hardy, 1 album, 1973, Arts & Voyages Gamma
- Rataplan, art by Berck, 7 albums, 1968-1973, Le Lombard
- Richard Cœur de Lion, art by Philippe Delaby, 1 album, 1991, Le Lombard
- RSC Anderlecht, art by Charles Jarry, 1 album, 2008, Dupuis
- Spaghetti, art by Dino Attanasio, 1 album, 1982, Dargaud
- Val, art by Eddy Paape, 1 album, 2006, JD
- Viva Panchico, art by Berck, 1 album, 2010, BD Must
