= Le insaziabili =

Tant d'amour perdu (original title)
- Directed by: Léo Joannon
- Written by: Roland Laudenbach; Léo Joannon
- Starring: Pierre Fresnay; Franca Bettoia; Anne Doat
- Cinematography: André Bac
- Edited by: Monique Isnardon; Robert Isnardon
- Music by: Jimmy Giuffre; Marc Lanjean
- Distributed by: Gaumont Distribution
- Release date: 12 November 1958 (France)
- Running time: 90 minutes
- Countries: Italy; France
- Language: Italian

Tant d'amour perdu (Le insaziabili) is a 1958 French-Italian film. It stars Pierre Fresnay and Gabriele Ferzetti.

== Cast ==
- Pierre Fresnay: Joseph Andrieu
- Franca Bettoia: Annie
- Anne Doat: Christine
- Gabriele Ferzetti: Frédéric Solingen
- Claude Titre: Michel Mortier
- Michel Bardinet: Lionel de Bellac
- Marguerite Pierry: Léocadie
- The Bernard Jarrige: The Undertaker
- René Bergeron: Martin
