= La Vallée infernale =

1953 novel by Henri Vernes

- Author: Henri Vernes
- Language: French
- Publication date: 10 May 1953
- Publication place: Belgium
- Media type: Print (hardback and paperback)
- Pages: 336

La Vallée infernale is the first novel in the Bob Morane series, written by the Belgian novelist Henri Vernes. It was first published in 1953.

== Main characters ==
- Bob Morane.
- Bill Ballantine: mechanic of Bob Morane's B-25 Mitchell.
- Lewis Broom: Australian who was a bomber pilot during World War II. He forces Bob Morane to land in the middle of Papuan territory in order to seize the emeralds of the Negritos.
- John Greb: accomplice of Lewis Broom.
- Vincente Rojas: Portuguese from Macao. He wants to photograph a lost valley recently discovered in New Guinea. He is then the accomplice of Broom and Greb.
- Frank Reeves: American billionaire aviator during the war. His plane crashed in a remote valley in New Guinea in March 1944 where he remained a prisoner for five years. It is issued by Bob Morane.
- Herbert Blaine: shipwrecked in New Guinea, he shares the fate of Frank Reeves.
- John Felton: shipwrecked in New Guinea, he shares the fate of Frank Reeves.
- Tawoureh: chief of the Papou s Alfourus.
- Maïri: chief of Négritos.
- Gibbs: major, head of the Royal Air Force, then head of the Papoua Airline. He is the employer of Bob Morane and Bill Ballantine.
- Carpenter: he represents Papoua Airline at Téléfomin.
- Payne: employee of the airport at Téléfomin.

== Synopsis ==
The story takes place in Papua New Guinea. Bob is an airline pilot and his job is to transport cargo from the coast to the interior of the island. One day his boss forced him to take three passengers to a dangerous region. The first wants to take a photo of a remarkable valley. The other two want to fly over where their bomber crashed in WWII. In reality, they want to steal the emerald eyes of a statue worshiped by the pygmies Negritos.

The three men therefore force Bob to land, not without breakage, in a clearing. Then the three heavily armed passengers plunge into the virgin forest. A few hours later, Bob and Bill, who remained near the wreckage of the plane to call for help, hear the sounds of guns and grenades. These are the three bandits who are attacked by the Papuans Alfourous, head cutters and cannibals. One of the white men is killed and the survivors are taken prisoner.

Unable to resist his sense of duty, Bob goes to their aid. He will make a raft, navigate an underground river, escape a sudden flood, dig a tunnel, kill the sorcerer who was about to sacrifice the two whites, flee through the galleries of a volcano, steal a canoe, guide three American aviators lost for five years in the forest, allow the victory of the Negritos in their war against the Alfourous.

To thank them for their help, the Negritos offer hospitality to their saviors. A few days pass before the rescue helicopters arrive. The bandits take advantage of the resulting commotion to steal the emeralds. They are discovered by the pygmies who kill one of them. The other fled into the forest. To thank Bob and Bill for saving the sacred stones, the leader of the Negritos offers them a handful of emeralds.

A few days later, Bob stayed in Port Moresby to give depositions and Bill returned to Scotland. He spots and has the police arrested the last of the thieves as he tries to assassinate him in his sleep to steal the jewels from him.
