= L'oncle Paul =

Belgian comic series

"Les Belles Histoires de l'oncle Paul"
- Author(s): Jean-Michel Charlier, Victor Hubinon
- Current status/schedule: Terminated.
- Launch date: 1951
- End date: 1982
- Genre(s): Educational comics, Historical comics

Les Belles Histoires de l'oncle Paul, and later Les Plus Belles Histoires de l'oncle Paul, is a Belgian comics series of historical stories created by Jean-Michel Charlier and Eddy Paape and published in the Franco-Belgian comics magazine Spirou from 1951 to 1982.

== Theme ==
Oncle Paul, as drawn by Victor Hubinon, from the small strip situated at the top of each story

The series consists of various short stories relating the historical character's life, an invention, an historical event, or a story taking place in the past. A wise and learned man, the uncle Paul, use a pretext to tell a story to his two nephews, most of the time following a foolish remark or deed of the nephews. The purpose of the series was entirely educational and didactic, and served as a kind of illustrated history lessons for the young Spirou readers.

== Publication history ==
The first strip appeared in the issue 668 of Spirou at the beginning of 1951, named Cap plein Sud. The series was first drawn by Eddy Paape, who at that time was drawing the series Valhardi. In 1952, Octave Joly became the main writer of the series. This series, very popular, made it possible for a lot of newcoming authors to hone their skills and make themselves well-known, among them Paape, Attanasio, Jean Graton, Mitacq (La Patrouille des Castors), Hermann (Jeremiah) and Gérald Forton (Bob Morane). Several albums grouping the strips were published between in the 1950s. In the 70s, the series appeared less frequently, and finally disappeared in the 80s. L'oncle Paul was parodied many times in Spirou as well as in other magazines. An album of parodies was published.

== Albums ==
Les Histoires vraies de l'Oncle Paul is a series of comics albums published by Dupuis grouping the Belles Histoires de l'Oncle Paul stories previously published in Spirou.

- Tome 1: Barbe-Noire (1953)
- Tome 2: Comment naquit la Marseillaise (1953)
- Tome 3: Cap plein sud - 7 histoires d'exploration, 1953.
  - Tacq and Joly - Saïd, ami fidèle.
  - Paape and Charlier - Cap plein sud.
  - Paape and Charlier - Martyrs du pôle sud.
  - Paape and Charlier - Comment mourut Amundsen.
  - Paape and Charlier - Médecin des noirs.
  - Graton and Charlier - Le héros de Budapest.
  - Graton and Charlier - Seul contre la barbarie.
- Tome 4: Guynemer - 7 histoires sur la conquête de l'air, 1953.
  - Graton and Joly - Les conquérants du ciel.
  - Graton and Joly - Premier match aérien.
  - Graton and Joly - Guynemer.
  - Paape end Joly - Courrier sûr.
  - Attanasio and Charlier - Guillaumet.
  - Attanasio et Charlier - L'ange de la Cordillère.
  - Paape and Charlier - Les sacrifiés du Canal Albert.
- Tome 5: Le Mystère du brick fantôme - 7 histoires de navigateurs, 1953.
  - Paape and Joly - Révolte sur le négrier.
  - Tacq and Attanasio - Kon-Tiki.
  - Graton and Joly - Le Toumelin.
  - Graton and Joly - Le mystère de la "Marie-Céleste" [sic].
  - Graton and Joly - Le secret du Brick Fantôme.
  - Graton and Charlier - La Vierge de la Grand-Porte.
  - Graton and Joly - Forceur d'abîmes.
- Tome 6: Trois Enfants contre les indiens - 7 histoires d'enfants prodiges, 1953.
  - Follet and Joly - Mozart.
  - Graton and Joly - Trois enfants contre les peaux-rouges.
  - Attanasio and Dewinne - Le fils du boulanger.
  - Follet and Joly - Sapeur de 10 ans.
  - Graton and Joly - Tom, gosse impossible.
  - Graton and Joly - Le Télégraphiste-Catastrophe.
  - Tacq and Joly - Drame dans un phare.
- Tome 7: Héros d'épopée - 7 histoires de héros d'épopée, 1954.
  - Attanasio and Joly - La mort de Roland.
  - Attanasio and Joly - Guillaume Tell.
  - Paape and Joly - Boduognat contre César.
  - Tacq and Joly - Dollard des Ormeaux.
  - Dupuis and Goscinny - De Lattre.
  - Graton and Joly - Trafalgar.
  - Tacq and Joly - Rien à signaler, mon général.
- Tome 8: Combattant de la vie- 7 histoires sur les combattants de la vie, 1954.
  - Graton and Joly - Echec au feu du ciel.
  - Graton and Attanasio - Le Brésil est malade.
  - Graton and Attanasio - Gutenberg.
  - Attanasio and Joly - Un étudiant nommé Louis.
  - Attanasio and Joly - Tue-moi, mais ne brouille pas cela.
  - Forton and Joly - Un voyage tragique.
  - Forton and Joly - L'homme en blanc.
- Tome 9: Robert le Diable - 7 histoires fantastiques, 1954.
  - Graton and Joly - Le coup de Jarnac.
  - Tacq and Joly - Le chien de Montargis.
  - Graton and Joly - L'enfant, l'épée, le général.
  - Graton and Joly - A la gueule du canon.
  - Tacq and Attanasio - Robert le diable.
  - Paape and Joly - Rois mages tragiques.
  - Paape and Charlier - Paix sur la terre...
- Tome 10: Requins d'acier- 7 histoires sur les sous-marins, 1954.
  - Tacq and Joly - Fulton invente le premier sous-marin.
  - Paape and Charlier - Noël sous la mer.
  - Graton and Joly - Feu... 1... 2... 3!...
  - Forton and Joly - Le torpillage du Lusitania.
  - Graton and Joly - La fin d'un pirate.
  - Forton and Joly - A l'Abordage en 44.
  - Forton and Joly - Les hommes-grenouilles.
- Tome 11: Écumeurs des mers - 7 récits de marins, 1955.
  - Funcken and Joly - Le pirate magicien.
  - Funcken and Joly - Le vaisseau fantôme.
  - Funcken and Roquet - Le dernier voyage.
  - Forton and Attanasio - Laffite, pirate patriote.
  - Graton and Joly - L'exploit du "Vindictive".
  - Graton and Joly - La fin d'un corsaire.
  - Forton and Joly - Jonas moderne.
- Tome 12: Chasseurs de tombeau - 15 histoires sur des hommes remarquables, 1955
  - Hope and Charlier - Gouverneur malgré lui.
  - Follet and Joly - Léonard de Vinci.
  - Paape and Charlier - Le sculpteur de Florence.
  - Graton and Joly - Le vrai Robinson.
  - Dupuis and Gramberger - René Laënnec.
  - Dehon and Joly - Le petit Louis.
  - Dehon and Joly - Un gamin intelligent.
  - Dehon and Joly - Le roi des railways.
  - Paape and Roquet - Frédéric Sauvage.
  - Dupuis and Dupuis S. - Jack London.
  - Hidalgo and Charlier - Le hussard de la mors.
  - Hidalgo and Charlier - L'oiseau blanc.
  - Forton and Joly - Un kid de Londres.
  - Forton and Joly - Carter, chasseur de tombeaux.
  - Graton and Joly - John Ford.

In 1986, Les Histoires merveilleuses de l' Oncle Paul were published by Vents d'Ouest (ISBN 2-86967-012-5) and EDS (ISBN 2-905359-04-8). This was a pastiche and hommage album, featuring stories by a.o. Yves Chaland, Will, Frank Pé, Dany, Serge Clerc and Philippe Bercovici.

Many stories were later republished by Dupuis and other publishers, either as thematic albums or by author in anthology series.

== Sources ==
- L'oncle Paul publications in Le Journal de Spirou Archived 2008-07-23 at the Wayback Machine
- On Jean-Michel Charlier website
- http://vaillantfanclub.free.fr/spirou.htm
