= Bob Morane (1998 TV series) =

- The animated Bob Morane
- Genre: Animated
- Based on: Bob Morane
- Voices of: Emmanuel Jacomy; Marc Alfos
- Countries of origin: France; Canada
- Original languages: English; French
- No. of seasons: 1
- No. of episodes: 26

Production
- Producer: Canal +
- Running time: 25 minutes

Original release
- Network: Canal + Super Écran
- Release: 5 September – 29 November 1998

Bob Morane is an animated series, based on the fictional Belgian superspy Bob Morane. Claude Landry was a scriptwriter for the show.

== Cast ==
- Emmanuel Jacomy as Bob Morane
- Marc Alfos as Bill Ballantine
- Frédérique Tirmont as Sophia Paramount
- Yves Barsacq as Professeur Clérembart
- Patrick Osmond as Professeur Xhatan
- Francis Lax as Simon Lusse
- Hervé Bellon as Staggart

== Episode list ==
No.	Title	Original release date
1	"Terror at the Manicouagan" (French: Terreur à la Manicouagan)	September 5, 1998
2	"Secret of the Antarctic" (French: Le secret de l'Antarctique)	September 6, 1998
3	"Three Little Monkeys" (French: Les Trois petits singes)	September 12, 1998
4	"The Dinosaur Hunters" (French: Les chasseurs de dinosaures)	September 13, 1998
5	"Operation Wolf"; Transliteration: "fr" (Opération Wolf)	September 19, 1998
6	"Solar System Sentinels"; Transliteration: "fr" (Service Secret Soucoupe)	September 20, 1998
7	"Vapours from the Past"; Transliteration: "fr" (La vapeur du passé)	September 26, 1998
8	"Teeth of the Tiger" (French: Les dents du Tigre)	September 27, 1998
9	"Harvest of Disaster" (French: Les semeurs de foudre)	October 3, 1998
10	"The Mysterious Dr. Xhatan" (French: Le mystérieux Dr. Xhatan)	October 4, 1998
11	"Xhatan, Master of Light" (French: Xhatan, maître de la lumière)	October 10, 1998
12	"The Crown of Golconda" (French: La couronne de Golconde)	October 11, 1998
13	"The Yellow Shadow" (French: L'Ombre Jaune)	October 17, 1998
14	"Sword of the Paladin" (French: L'épée du Paladin)	October 18, 1998
15	"Revenge of the Yellow Shadow" (French: La revanche de l'Ombre Jaune)	October 24, 1998
16	"Judgement of the Yellow Shadow" (French: Le châtiment de l'Ombre Jaune)	October 25, 1998
17	"The Towers of Crystal" (French: Les tours de cristal)	October 31, 1998
18	"Terror Commandos" (French: Commando Épouvante)	November 1, 1998
19	"Return of the Yellow Shadow" (French: Le retour de l'Ombre Jaune)	November 7, 1998
20	"Puppets of the Yellow Shadow" (French: Les poupées de l'Ombre Jaune)	November 8, 1998
21	"Rendezvous Nowhere" (French: Rendez-vous à Nulle-Part)	November 14, 1998
22	"Operation Atlantis" (French: Opération Atlantide)	November 15, 1998
23	"The Walls of Ananke" (French: Les murailles d'Ananké)	November 21, 1998
24	"The Perils of Ananke" (French: Les périls d'Ananké)	November 22, 1998
25	"The Angels of Ananke" (French: Les anges d'Ananké)	November 28, 1998
26	"The Last Wall" (French: La dernière rosace)	November 29, 1998
