= Les Fabuleux Exploits d'Eddy Merckx =

Belgian celebrity comic

Comic book cover

Les Fabuleux Exploits d'Eddy Merckx (The Fabulous Exploits of Eddy Merckx) is a 1973 celebrity comic drawn by Christian Lippens and written by Yves Duval, based on the popularity of Belgian cycling champion Eddy Merckx. It tells the story of his career and is drawn in a realistic style. The book was created for Arts & Voyages Gamma.

== Plot ==
The book starts off with Merckx winning his first amateur championship in Sallanches in 1964 and follows all his conquests, ending with him breaking the world record in cycling (1972) in Mexico.
