= The Triumph of Michael Strogoff =

1961 film directed by Viktor Tourjansky

- Directed by: Viktor Tourjansky
- Written by: Marc-Gilbert Sauvajon
- Based on: Michael Strogoff by Jules Verne
- Produced by: Emile Natan; Salvatore Persichetti; Joseph Spigler
- Starring: Curd Jürgens; Capucine; Claude Titre
- Cinematography: Edmond Séchan
- Edited by: Armand Ridel; Henri Taverna
- Music by: Christian Chevallier; Hubert Giraud
- Production companies: Fono Roma; Les Films Modernes
- Release date: 15 December 1961
- Running time: 118 minutes
- Countries: France; Italy
- Language: Italian

The Triumph of Michael Strogoff (French: Le triomphe de Michel Strogoff) is a 1961 French-Italian historical adventure film directed by Viktor Tourjansky and starring Curd Jürgens, Capucine and Claude Titre. It is inspired by the 1876 novel Michael Strogoff by Jules Verne. Jürgens had previously played the role in the 1956 film Michel Strogoff.

== Premise ==
In a campaign against the Turks, a Russian officer encounters trouble when he goes to the aid of a young prince

== Cast ==
- Curd Jürgens as Michel Strogoff
- Capucine as Tatiana Volskaya
- Claude Titre as Igor Vassiliev
- Pierre Massimi as Serge de Bachenberg
- Albert Pierjac as Ivan Colinov
- Daniel Emilfork as Ben Routh
- Valéry Inkijinoff as Amektal
- Simone Valère as L'impératrice
- Rico Lopez as Le cavalier
- Georges Lycan as Le Khan
- Jacques Bézard
- Raymond Gérôme
- Pierre Mirat
- Henri Nassiet

== Production ==
Capucine was French but this was her first sizeable role in a European film, and made it after Song Without End and North to Alaska.

== Bibliography ==
- Goble, Alan. The Complete Index to Literary Sources in Film. Walter de Gruyter, 1999.
