= Mitacq =

- Born: Michel Tacq; 10 June 1927 Uccle, Belgium
- Died: 22 May 1994 (aged 66)
- Areas: writer, drawer
- Pseudonyms: Balou, Mitack, Toucan Bénévole
- Notable works: La Patrouille des Castors

Michel Tacq, or Mitacq, (10 June 1927 – 22 May 1994) was an author of Belgian comics. He was involved in Scouting for most of his life.

== Biography ==
Born in Uccle, Michel Tacq spent his childhood in Farciennes and Brussels. He went to study at the Saint-Marie Institute in Schaerbeek and stayed in France for the first years of World War II. He then returned to Belgium to continue his art studies in Charleroi. Ever since his early childhood, Tacq was involved in Scouting, a movement that has been of influence his entire career. At 17, he took on the pseudonym Mitak and developed the comic strip Tam Tam, which appeared in magazines related with Scouting in 1944 and 1945. Tam Tam also appeared in book collections, published by José Henin and De Beiaard. He illustrated for Plein Jeu, Carrefour and L'Hebdomadaire des grands recits.

In 1951, Michel Tacq was hired by the World Press, a company which provided Spirou magazine with comics strips. There, he trained and drew under the name "Balou" some 20 stories for the Oncle Paul series with writing by Octave Joly. He also illustrated "Seul maitre à bord", the 3rd novel of the collection "Marabout-Junior", written by Jean-Jacques Schellens, a friend Scout. However, MiTacq hoped for being able to draw a series dedicated to Boy Scouts. Jean Jacques Schellens wrote a scenario whose characters are Sanglier, Marabout, Gustave and Chat. Georges Troisfontaines, founder of the World Press, accepted to publish the project, at a time when the Signe de Piste collection was very popular, but he preferred to trust the scenario to Jean-Michel Charlier and demanded the characters to be reshaped. The first album of La Patrouille des Castors (The Beaver Patrol), Le mystere de Grosbois, was published in 1954 in Spirou magazine. In the face of the immediate success of the series, Dupuis decided to publish albums from 1955. With this series, his career really took off.

A second album was published, Les disparus de Ker Aven. Scout leader at Saint Alène, Mitacq decided after the third album to be more committed in the scenario of the series, to insist on the Scouting themes. In 1956 is published Sur la piste de Mowgli, strongly influenced by Kipling's novels. In 1957, he made a report for Spirou magazine at the 9th World Scout Jamboree at Sutton-Coldfield in England with Yvan Delporte. For the creation of Pilote in 1959, Charlier proposed to Mitacq to illustrate the adventures of Jacques Legall. En 1965, with the separation in France of the Scouts into two branches, Rangers and Pionniers, MiTacq and Charlier decided to turn the Castors into Pionniers to develop more opportunities of adventures. L'autobus hanté, the first adventures of the patrol with their new uniform, relating the crossing of Europe in an autobus, was very successful and imitated by several Scouts at that time. In the 1960s, Charlier was so busy that Mitacq created the adventures of Stany Derval. In 1979, Charlier et MiTacq decided amically to stop their longtime collaboration in the course of the making of the album Prisonniers du large. Between 1954 and 1980 22 albums were made by Mitacq and Charlier.

This separation did not prevent MiTacq from going on alone or in collaboration with Marc Wasterlain or Jacques Stoquart. On the contrary, this new situation provided him with more autonomy and allowed him to deal with other matters he insisted on. He died on 22 May 1994, leaving unfinished the 31st tome of the Castors series. The integrale of Mitacq's works were published by Dupuis after his death.

== Influences and style ==
Michel Tacq, as an active Scout, was very influenced by the movement's culture. Toucan Bénévole was his totem as Scout in the Troop Saint Aléne at Saint Gilles Bruxelles, then he became Assistant Cub Scout Master from 1951 till 1954, then Pionnier for 5 years. He visited the 1957 World Jamboree. In the first albums of the Beaver Patrol series, the protagonists wear the same yellow and bleu scarf as the Saint Alène troop.

He provided for a long time illustrations to the Scouting magazine Plein Jeu from 1950 and for Piste' a magazine consisting of 300 pages of "first and second class badges" for the Belgian Catholic Scout Federation. He has also drawn illustrations in the magazines Carnet du Louveteau, En route ! and Carrefour, and at the end of his career in Trefle d'Aventure, the magazine of the Belgian catholic guides.

He was highly influenced and fascinated by Pierre Joubert and Jijé, notably by the comics album of Jijé dedicated to Baden-Powell's life, which incited him to create a series relating the adventures of a Scout patrol. The graphic style is highly influenced by that of Pierre Joubert. In 1950, he was advised to meet him to improve his style and lived with him for three months. The youngest Beaver Scout, Mouche, was modelled on Pierre Joubert's son.

Fan of the collection Signe de Piste, MiTacq insisted to illustrate one of the novels of the series. In the course of 1975, he devoted two months to draw the cover and ten illustrations for Jean Destieu's Les Emeraudes de Colombie.

MiTacq also paid tribute to Serge Dalens, the author of the Prince Eric series, by an illustration in 1987, the year when the 50th anniversary of the collection Signe de Piste was celebrated. It is also said that the scenario of the album La couronne cachée (1965), the 13th album of the Beaver Patrol series, was partly inspired by Serge Dalens' Le prince Éric.

== Publications ==
- La Patrouille des Castors (30 stories published between 1957 and 1993 by Dupuis): the Beaver Patrol was formed of five Boy Scouts with guest members. The comic strip was published in the magazine Spirou. The long collaboration with Jean-Michel Charlier took off in 1954. Mitacq died in 1994 and the Beaver Patrol cartoon series ended. A few months after his death, Spirou magazine justly honoured one of its greatest contributors by giving him a grand homage. The Belgian Scouts also published his illustrations on their 1995 calendar. His books remain popular today among fans and are translated into several languages. With the publication of the first episode of 'La Patrouille des Castors', in the magazine Spirou. 'La Patrouille des Castors', an adventure series about a group of scouts, became Tacq's trademark series. Starting in 1960, MiTacq sporadically illustrated 'La Patrouille des Zoms', a parody on the Castors, written by Yvan Delporte.
- Jacques Le Gall (4 stories published in albums between 1980 and 1985 by Dupuis) was illustrated by MiTacq and Follet. In 1959, at the creation of the magazine Pilote, Charlier proposed him to illustrate this new series. The series only ran for six long episodes, and was cancelled due to editorial reasons.Jacques Le Gall faced several contemporary enigmas, including the Templiers' and Nazis'tresory and Mediterranean smuggling. The series was later published in Spirou and in albums by Dupuis.
- Stany Derval (3 stories published in albums between 1981 and 1987 by Dupuis) was drawn and written by MiTacq alone. When Charlier got too involved with his other comics, MiTacq launched a series of his own to overlap the interludes between Castor stories. From 1968 until 1979, he drew the adventures of Stany Derval, an adventurous motorcyclist, cooperating with several writers, such as André-Paul Duchateau, Maurice Tillieux, Jacques Stoquart, or André Beckers. He was sometimes assisted on the artwork by René Follet. After his separation with Charlier, he gave up the series but make Stany Derval appear in some Castors albums.
- Tout Mitacq: the integrale collection Tout MiTacq, published between 1989 and 1997 by Dupuis, consists of 14 volumes grouping La patrouille des Castors, Jacques Le Gall, Stany Derval, plus relevant commentaries about each albums and many illustrations for magazines. Each volume groups 3 or 4 full original albums and consists of 164 pages around.

The back cover of the albums collection "Tout Mitacq", representing the main protagonists drawn and created by Mitacq

1. Les castors face aux ombres mystérieuses
2. Les castors sur des pistes incertaines
3. Les castors par monts et par vaux
4. Les castors du mas au palais
5. Les castors et les signaux invisibles
6. Les castors dans la gueule du loup
7. Les castors explorateurs des ténèbres
8. Les castors sauvés des eaux
9. Stany Derval à la recherche de l'insolite
10. Les castors et les pierres qui racontent
11. Stany Derval à l'aventure autour du monde
12. Les castors sur l'île du crabe
13. Jacques Le Gall, le randonneur de l'aventure
14. Jacques Le Gall et les trésors cachés
