= La Patrouille des Castors =

Belgian comic book series

La Patrouille des Castors, cover of Le mystère de Gros-Bois, 1955.

La Patrouille des Castors (The Beaver Patrol) is a series of Belgian comics drawn by MiTacq and written by Jean-Michel Charlier. 30 albums were published between 1955 and 1993, by Dupuis, all relating the adventures of a Scout patrol.

== History ==
This series, which was first published in Spirou magazine on November 25, 1954, relates the fictional adventures of a Scout patrol. In the first album, the patrol consisted of six Scouts, although one of them, Lapin (rabbit) disappeared quickly from future stories after the team decided five main characters was a more suitable number for the series. The artist, Michel Tacq (MiTacq), had himself been a Scout during a large part of his life. It was his idea to create a series with Scouts as the main characters, but he needed a script to realise the project, which was provided in 1954 by Charlier, already a very active scriptwriter.

The publication in Spirou lasted from 1954 until 1979 although there was a long interruption from the beginning of 1967 until April 1971, after which publication was slower than it had been before 1967, because Charlier was then very busy with the several other series for which he was writing. Charlier was eventually replaced by Marc Wasterlain who wrote the scripts for two albums, and then, MiTacq took over as writer. Several albums only credit MiTacq as writer and artist, whereas in reality he was assisted either by Charlier, Wasterlain or his friend Jacques Stoquart.

== Background ==
The Beaver Patrol is a group of scouts who are taken on adventurous situations provided, most of the time, by their Scout camp during their holidays in foreign countries. As all Scouts should, they act honourably and charitably, but they face enigmas and puzzles in each region they visit in the best traditions of boys own adventures. Each character of the patrol has a very distinct profile, which makes it possible for them to have all the qualities needed in difficult situations.

As the series goes on, the graphic style evolves and the protagonists get older. They replaced their blue shirt (designed for 12- to 17-year-old boys) by a red shirt (made for Pioneers, 15- to 17-year-old scouts), according to the 1964 uniform reform for Belgian Scouts. Although Spirou magazine is Belgian, as well as the two creators of the series, its audience was primarily in France. During the course of the stories the Beavers left their native country often to travel to other countries and continents. Not only did the Beavers travel in various countries but the stories also took place in varied locations, be it underground, on the sea and even underwater.

The series was parodied by the author himself in a story written with Yvan Delporte with the series La Patrouille des Zoms.

== Characters ==
The patrol is a built like an example of a perfect Scout troop, with each member having a totem and specific qualities:

- Poulain (foal) : the Patrol leader, courageous but prudent and reasonable. He is 15 at the beginning of the series, he is the perfect hero without any obvious faults, he makes the appropriate decisions in case of difficulties.
- Chat (cat) : the patrol second, Poulain's double, as reasonable but more discreet at the beginning of the series, although later his character becomes a bit more varied.
- Faucon (hawk): the intellectual, very resourceful in ideas, he is 15, wears glasses and intervenes to solve enigmas thanks to his huge knowledge, and provides cultural or scientific references when needed. His father Mr. Bridoison, is a famous physician and chemist.
- Tapir (tapir): a lively 14-year-old boy and MiTacq's favorite character, he provides the series with the gags and the humour. He is very greedy, fat and often moans. Eating is a real obsession, so that he is the Scout in charge of the food and the meals in the patrol. His father, Mr. Lebedon, is a grocer.
- Mouche (fly): the youngest member of the patrol (13 years old), introverted and physically and psychologically weak.

== Albums ==
All published by Dupuis:

- 1957 Le mystère de Gros-Bois
- 1957 Le disparu de Ker-Aven
- 1958 L'inconnu de la villa mystère
- 1959 Sur la piste de Mowgli
- 1959 La bouteille à la mer
- 1960 Le trophée de Rochecombe
- 1961 Le secret des monts tabou
- 1961 Le hameau englouti
- 1962 Le traitre sans visage
- 1963 Le signe indien
- 1964 Les loups écarlates
- 1965 Menace en Camargue
- 1965 La couronne cachée
- 1966 Le chaudron du diable
- 1967 L'autobus hanté
- 1969 Le fantôme
- 1972 Le pays de la mort
- 1973 Les démons de la nuit
- 1974 Vingt milliards sous la terre
- 1977 El demonio
- 1979 Passeport pour le néant
- 1980 Prisonniers du large
- 1983 L'envers du décor
- 1984 Souvenirs d'Elcasino
- 1984 L'empreinte
- 1986 L'île du crabe
- 1987 Blocus
- 1989 Le calvaire du mort pendu
- 1990 Torrents sur Mésin
- 1993 La pierre de foudre

All of these albums were collected in the collection Tout MiTacq, consisting of 14 volumes published between 1989 and 1996 by Dupuis.
