= Henri Vernes =

Belgian writer (1918–2021)

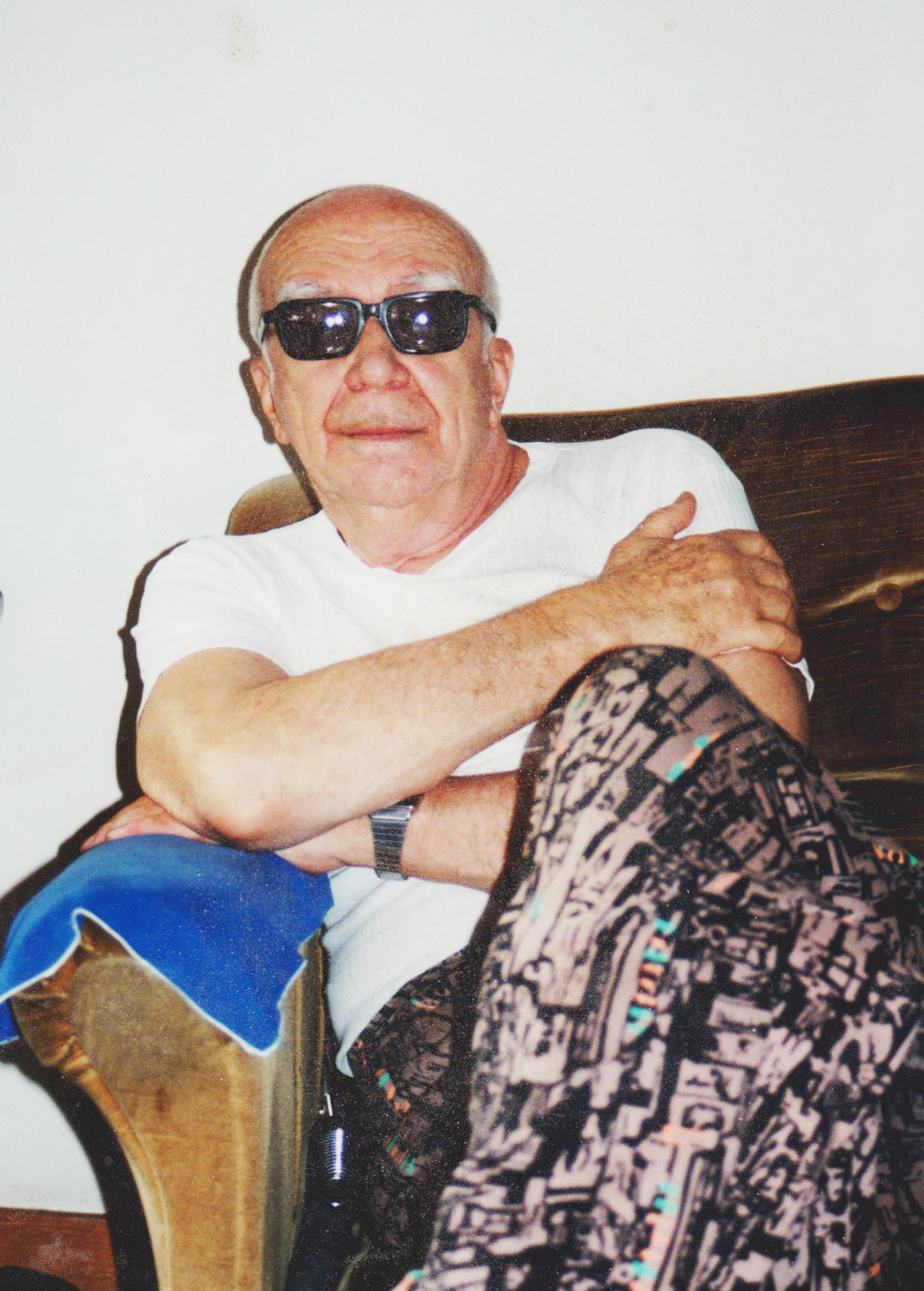
- Vernes in 1995
- Born: Charles-Henri-Jean Dewisme; 16 October 1918; Ath, Wallonia, Belgium
- Died: 25 July 2021 (aged 102); Brussels, Belgium
- Occupation: Writer
- Writing career
- Notable work: Bob Morane

Charles-Henri-Jean Dewisme (16 October 1918 – 25 July 2021), better known by his pen name Henri Vernes (French pronunciation: [ɑ̃ʁi vɛʁn]), was an author of action and science fiction novels. He published over 200 titles in the action and science-fiction genre. He was most noted for the creation of the character Bob Morane, a hero whose adventures spanned fifty years and went from straight adventure and science-fiction to fantasy. Vernes also wrote the text of many comics albums and animated movies.

Dewisme used a number of other pseudonyms, including Jacques Colombo, Robert Davids, Duchess Holiday, C. Reynes, Jacques Seyr, Lew Shannon, and Ray Stevens, as well as his real name.

== Biography ==
Henri Vernes was the child of Valérie Dupuis and Alphonse Léon Dewisme. After his parents separated, he was raised by his maternal grandparents. At age sixteen he dropped out of high school and worked for a time as helper in his father's butcher shop, but eventually went back to school at Enghien. In 1937 he fell in love with a Chinese woman, "Madame Lou", and went with her on a two-month trip to Canton, using a fake passport.

Back in Tournai, in 1938 he married Gilberte, daughter of a diamond cutter; but the marriage dissolved in 1941. During World War II he served in the army's intelligence services. In 1944 he published his first book, La Porte Ouverte (The Open Door).

In 1946 he moved to Paris and wrote for a while for an American news agency and French newspapers. Still, he continued writing novels. In 1949 he published La Belle Nuit pour un Homme Mort (Good Night for a Dead Man), and moved back to Belgium.

Between 1949 and 1953 Vernes wrote several tales for weekly magazines like Heroïc Albums and Mickey Magazine, under various pen names. In 1953 he was invited to write an adventure novel for the series Marabout–Junior (Éditions Gérard). His Conquérants de l'Everest (Conquerors of the Everest) was an instant success, and he became a leading writer of that collection.

Those books saw the debut of Vernes's most popular hero, Bob Morane, and of his main companions Bill Ballantine, Frank Reeves, Aristide Clairembart; as well as of his first villain, Roman Orgonetz. The first comics album, L'oiseau de feu (The Fire Bird) came out in 1959, drawn by Dino Attanasio, and was another resounding success. Between 1959 and 1967 Bob Morane was the star of many more books, albums, a short film, L'espion aux cent visages (The Spy with a Hundred Faces (1960), and a TV series that ran through 26 episodes. Through that period Vernes started several other adventure cycles and introduced several other characters, such as the villain Monsieur Ming (also known as "L'Ombre jaune" or the Yellow Shadow), Dr Xathan, and Miss Ylang-Ylang.

In the 1960s, when his popularity with Bob Morane was at its peak, Vernes dedicated himself to promoting the work of his colleague and friend Jean Ray, a fellow Belgian, whose books remained largely unknown to most people in France. He gave numerous interviews and wrote prefaces to praise the man he called "the equal of Poe and Hoffmann in the realm of fantastic literature."

After 1967 the Marabout–Junior collection was reformatted and renamed Pocket Marabout. Vernes continued writing for the series, with old and new characters. His popularity remained strong, and by 1970 the series had sold over 15 million books. In 1974 he started the cycle of Ananké, considered by many to be his masterpiece. However, this success did not save Marabout from the publishing crisis of the 1970s, and in 1977 the series came to an end with issue 142, Bob Morane dans le Triangle des Bermudes (Bob Morane in the Bermuda Triangle).

Over the next 28 years, Vernes authored scores of new titles, including the adult Don cycle (whose books he signed "Jacques Colombo") and supervised many re-issues of his older works. His 200th novel, the Bob Morane adventure La guerre du Pacifique n'aura pas lieu (The Pacific War Will Not Happen) was issued in 1996.

Vernes was the subject of a documentary, Henri Vernes, un aventurier de l'imaginaire (1997), and in 1999, at age 81, he was decorated as Officier in the Belgian Order of Arts and Letters. A fan club, Club Bob Morane, was created in 1986 on the hero's 33rd anniversary.

== Works ==
=== Novels ===
- 1953 : La Vallée infernale

=== Albums ===
- 1962 : Les tours de cristal (Marabout, vol. 3)
- 1973 : Les géants de Mu (Dargaud)
- 2000 : Le lagon aux requins (éd. Nautilus) the sharks lagoon illustrations by René Follet
