= Bob Morane (1965 TV series) =

- Genre: Action; Spy fiction
- Created by: Henri Vernes
- Based on: Bob Morane
- Starring: Claude Titre
- Country of origin: France
- Original language: French
- No. of seasons: 2
- No. of episodes: 26

Production
- Running time: 26 minutes

Original release
- Network: ORTF
- Release: 28 March 1965

Bob Morane is a French television series produced by Robert Vernay based on the character of the same name that was created by Henri Vernes. This series was first broadcast on 28 March 1965 on ORTF.

== Synopsis ==
This series features the adventures of Bob Morane, at the same time journalist, engineer, expert in weapons and martial arts, often with the help of his "sidekick "Bill Ballantine, confronting dictatorships, dangerous megalomaniacs and secret societies around the world and, occasionally," The Time ".

== Cast ==
- Claude Titre as Bob Morane
- Billy Kearns as Bill Ballantine

== Episode list ==
No.	Title	Original release date
1	(French: Le Cheik masqué)	28 March 1965
2	(French: Rafale en Méditerranée)	TBA
3	(French: Le Témoin)	TBA
4	(French: Le Prince)	TBA
5	(French: Le Tigre des lagunes)	TBA
6	(French: Le Club des longs couteaux)	TBA
7	Transliteration: "La Galère engloutie"	TBA
8	(French: Le Démon solitaire)	TBA
9	(French: Complot à Trianon)	TBA
10	(French: La Voix du mainate)	TBA
11	(French: Échec à la Main Noire)	TBA
12	(French: Les Semeurs de foudre)	TBA
13	(French: La Vallée des brontosaures)	TBA
14	(French: Le Temple des crocodiles)	TBA
15	(French: Mission pour Montellano ( M ) MISSION POUR THULÉ)	TBA
16	(French: Le Lagon aux requins)	TBA
17	(French: La Fleur du sommeil)	TBA
18	(French: 5.Les Forbans de l'or noir)	TBA
19	(French: Le Dragon des Fenstone)	TBA
20	(French: L'Héritage du flibustier)	TBA
21	(French: La Cité des sables)	TBA
22	(French: Les Joyaux du Maharadjah)	TBA
23	(French: Le Gardian noir)	TBA
24	(French: Mission à Orly)	TBA
25	(French: Le Camion infernal)	TBA
26	(French: La Rivière de perles)	TBA
