= Jean Roze =

Textile producer in Saint-Avertin, Indre-et-Loire, France

- Industry: Textile
- Founded: 1656
- Headquarters: 10 Rue Frédéric Joliot Curie, 37550 Saint-Avertin, France
- Website: www.soieries-jean-roze.com/en

Jean Roze is a traditional textile producer in Saint-Avertin, Indre-et-Loire, France established in 1756. The workshop specializes in the manufacture of silks for high-end furnishings. It is one of the oldest silks in France still in operation.

Exports represent the majority of the company's turnover. Jean Roze exports to Europe, United States, United Arab Emirates and Russia. Prestigious places are on the list of their clients, such as Oman, Buckingham Palace in London, or the Castle of Villandry.

It is a family-owned business which has been in the Roze family for more than eight generations.

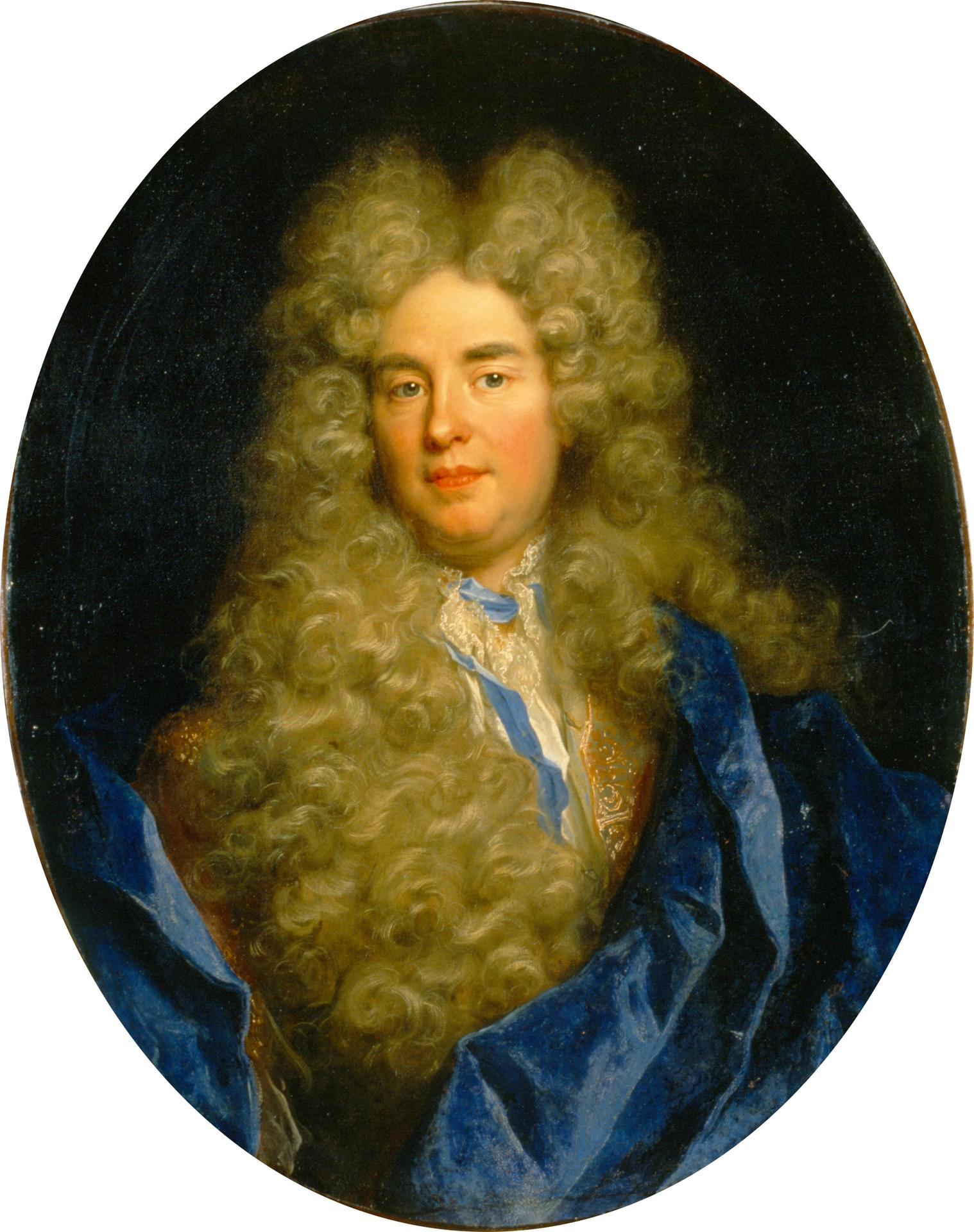
Jehan-Baptiste Roze-Moussard, first of the Tourangel dynasty (by Nicolas de Largillierre, 1697).

== See also ==
- List of oldest companies
