= William Vance =

Belgian comics artist (1935–2018)

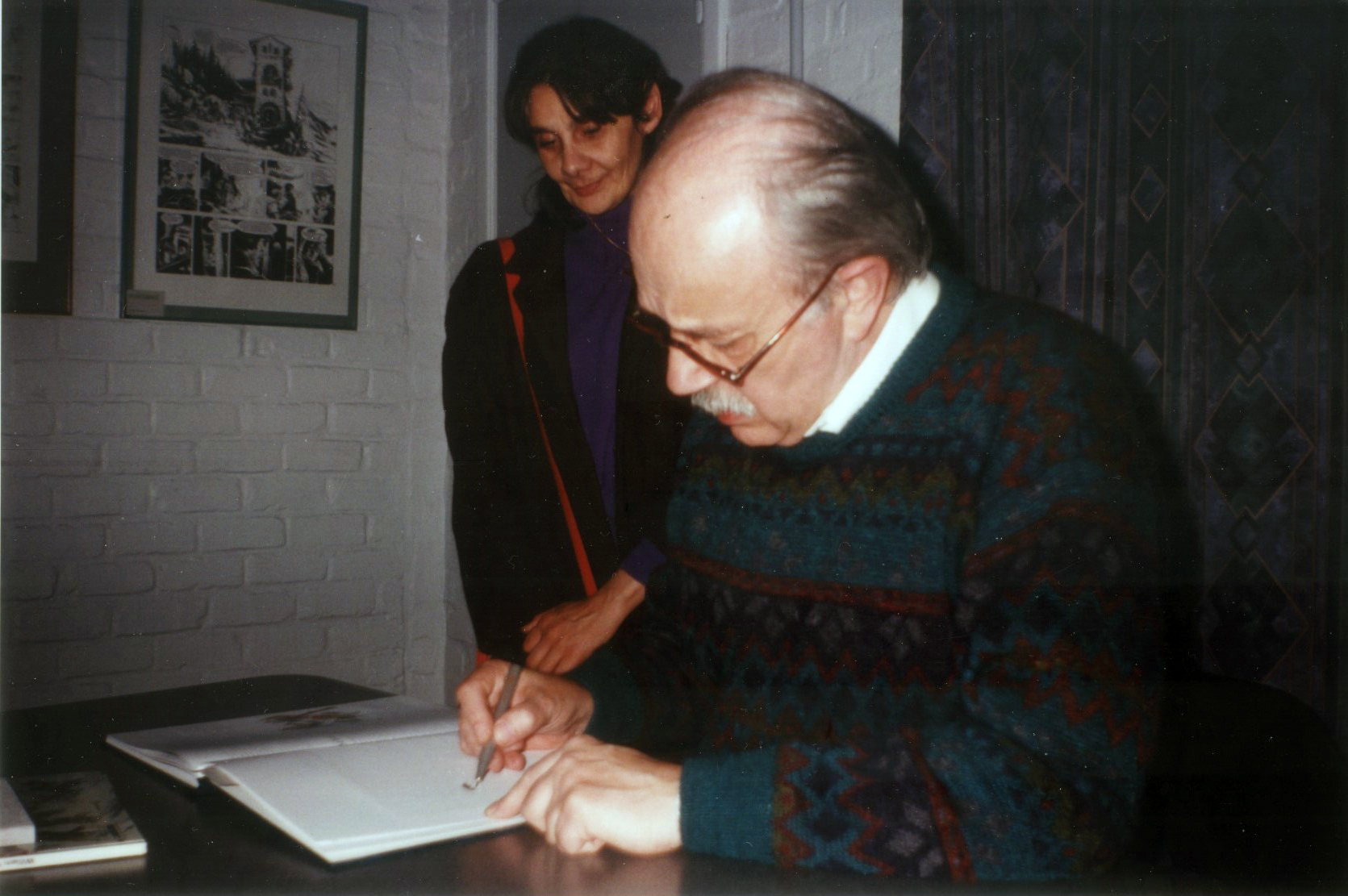
- Vance in 1994
- Born: William van Cutsem; 8 September 1935 Anderlecht, Belgium
- Died: 14 May 2018 (aged 82) Santander, Spain
- Areas: artist, writer
- Notable works: XIII; Bob Morane; Bruce J. Hawker; Bruno Brazil
- Awards: full list

William van Cutsem (8 September 1935 – 14 May 2018), better known by his pen name William Vance, was a Belgian comics artist known for his distinctive realistic style and work in Franco-Belgian comics.

== Biography ==
William van Cutsem was born in Anderlecht near Brussels in 1935, member of the Van Cutsem family. After his military service in 1955–1956, he studied for four years at the Académie Royale des Beaux-Arts in Brussels. Originally from Flanders, he worked most of his life in France, and moved later to Santander, Spain.

William Vance started drawing for the Franco-Belgian comics magazine Tintin in 1962. After drawing complete real-life stories of four pages for a few years, he started work on his first series, Howard Flynn, written by Yves Duval. Three albums followed, before he created other short-lived series such as the Western Ringo and Roderik. His first success followed with the series about secret agent Bruno Brazil, written by Tintin's editor-in-chief Greg, as one of the comics that started the revival and repositioning of Tintin as a more adult-oriented magazine. From 1967 on, he continued the stories of Bob Morane in Femmes d'aujourd'hui, a magazine aimed at adult women. This science fiction series, based on the novels by Henri Vernes, was started by Dino Attanasio and continued by Gerald Forton before Vance took over and made it a success. Between 1969 and 1979, 18 albums with his artwork were published. A few years later, the series moved to Tintin as well, and Vance was succeeded by his brother-in-law, Felicisimo Coria.

Vance meanwhile started two new series, Ramiro, with stories set in medieval Spain, and from 1976 onwards, Bruce J. Hawker, his personal favourite, starring a lieutenant in the Royal Navy.

His final breakthrough and largest commercial success came in 1984, when writer Jean Van Hamme proposed a new series, XIII. First serialised in Spirou magazine, this series of contemporary adventures with action, violence, and complicated intrigues, let Vance draw upon his talent for realistic drawings, action scenes and exotic settings. By 2007, he had drawn 18 albums in the series, which sold more than 14 million copies in more than 20 countries, and was twice adapted into a TV series. The series was coloured by his wife Petra Coria, with whom he lived in Santander, Spain.

In 2010, Vance announced his retirement due to Parkinson's disease. He died of the disease on 14 May 2018.

== Style ==
Vance worked in a highly detailed realistic style which has been described as "precise and nervous", an "inimitable" style resembling no other author. An article in Der Tagesspiegel discussing his series Bruno Brazil called his early work already "meticulous" and "sophisticated", but describes how in the early 1970s it drifted away from the more typical realistic style common in Belgian comics at the time, and became influenced by Dutch comics artist Hans G. Kresse. He also started experimenting with the page layout, with large central panels, and with the colouring, which showed influences of psychedelic art.

== Awards ==
- 2005: Bronzen Adhemar in Turnhout, Belgium
- 2009: Honorary citizen of the City of Brussels

== Bibliography ==
These are the comic albums drawn by William Vance published until 2007. Between 2001 and 2011 most of his older work was republished in Tout Vance by Le Lombard and by Dargaud.

Series	Years	Volumes	Scenarist	Publisher
Howard Flynn	1966–1969	3	Yves Duval	Le Lombard and Dargaud
Ringo	1967–1978	3	Acar	Le Lombard and Dargaud
Bruno Brazil	1969–1995	11	Greg	Le Lombard and Dargaud
Bob Morane	1967–1980	18	Henri Vernes	Le Lombard and Dargaud
C'étaient des hommes	1976	1	William Vance	Deligne
Ramiro	1974–1989	10	Jacques Stoquart	Dargaud
Roderic	1979	2	Lucien Meys	Bédéscope
XIII	1984–2007	18	Jean Van Hamme	Dargaud
Bruce J. Hawker	1985–1996	7	William Vance	Le Lombard
Marshall Blueberry	1991–1992	2	Jean Giraud	Alpen
XHG-C3 – Le vaisseau rebelle	1995	1	William Vance	Gibraltar

== Sources ==
- William Vance publications in BelgianTintin and French Tintin, Spirou, BoDoï BDoubliées (in French)
