= Emmanuel Jacomy =

French actor

Emmanuel Jacomy is a French actor who specializes in dubbing. He is the official dubbing voice of Pierce Brosnan as of 1995 but also is the dubbing voice of Denzel Washington, Forest Whitaker and many others.

== Roles ==
=== Television animation ===
- Superman: The Animated Series (Clark Kent / Superman)
- Justice League (Superman)
- American Dad! (Stan Smith)
- Cow and Chicken (Chicken)

=== Theatrical animation ===
- Beauty and the Beast (Beast (Robby Benson))
- Batman Ninja (Bruce Wayne / Batman (Kōichi Yamadera))
- Cars (Tex (Humpy Wheeler))
- Chicken Little (Hollywood Chicken Little (Adam West))
- Cinderella (1991 dub) (Jaq (James MacDonald))
- Finding Nemo (Mister Ray (Bob Peterson))
- The Hunchback of Notre Dame (Captain Phoebus (Kevin Kline))
- Kung Fu Panda 3 (Li Shan (Bryan Cranston))
- Kung Fu Panda 4 (Li Shan (Bryan Cranston))
- The Little Mermaid (Scuttle (Buddy Hackett))
- Paprika (Doctor Morio Osanai (Kōichi Yamadera))
- The Prince of Egypt (Ramesses II (Ralph Fiennes))
- Tarzan (Tarzan (Tony Goldwyn))
- The Jungle Book 2 (Lucky (Phil Collins))
- The Rescuers Down Under (Wilbur (John Candy))
- The Wild (Samson the Lion (Kiefer Sutherland))
- How to Train Your Dragon (Stoick the Vast (Gerard Butler))
- How to Train Your Dragon 2 (Stoick the Vast (Gerard Butler))

=== Video games ===
- Kingdom Hearts (Tarzan, Beast)
- Kingdom Hearts II (Beast)

=== Live action ===
- Die Another Day (James Bond (Pierce Brosnan))
- Evelyn (Desmond Doyle (Pierce Brosnan))
- Forrest Gump (Lieutenant Dan Taylor (Gary Sinise))
- Full Metal Jacket (Private Joker (Matthew Modine))
- Ghost (Carl Bruner (Tony Goldwyn))
- GoldenEye (James Bond (Pierce Brosnan))
- Panic Room (Burnham (Forest Whitaker))
- The World Is Not Enough (James Bond (Pierce Brosnan))
- Tomorrow Never Dies (James Bond (Pierce Brosnan))
- White Noise (Jonathan Rivers (Michael Keaton))
- Training Day (Det. Alonzo Harris (Denzel Washington))
- Remember The Titans (Coach Herman Boone (Denzel Washington))
- The Cat in the Hat (Lawrence Quinn (Alec Baldwin))
- The Nice Guys (Jackson Healy (Russell Crowe))
- To Wong Foo, Thanks for Everything! Julie Newmar (Vida Boheme (Patrick Swayze))
- Of Mice and Men (George Milton (Gary Sinise))
- Uncle Buck (Buck Russell (John Candy))
