= Bob Morane (comics) =

Belgian comic series

Publication information
- Publisher: Marabout; Dargaud; Le Lombard; Éditions Michel Deligne; Lefrancq
- Genre: Adventure espionage science-fiction
- Publication date: May 1959
- Main character(s): Bob Morane; Bill Ballantine; L'Ombre Jaune; Miss Ylang-Ylang; Tania Orloff; Miss Ylang-Ylang; Sophia Paramount

Creative team
- Written by: Dino Attanasio; Gérald Forton; William Vance; Coria; Dimitri Armand

Bob Morane is a Belgian comics series that was created by Henri Vernes and Dino Attanasio. It was published from May 21, 1959, in the Belgian weekly magazine Femmes d’Aujourd’hui and published in graphic novel form from 1960 to 2012 by Belgian publisher Marabout.

The comic was based on the novel character Bob Morane.

== Synopsis ==
Originally conceived as a sort of mid-barbouze adventurer, the character has evolved in half a century and now lives more varied adventures, from exotic travel to the story of spying or science fiction.

== Main characters ==
=== Bob Morane ===
Bob Morane is an international French spy/reporter who is an expert in various martial arts and use of weapons . Robert "Bob" Morane is 33 years old. An adventurer who spies occasionally and does not shy away from an underworld, he has secret service relationships (such as the American CIA spy Herbert Gains or the golden-toothed agent Roman Orgonetz ), among the most colorful representatives of the demobilized military and in all the farthest corners of the world. Bob Morane also cultivates, with a gallantry blue flower and a fairly meritorious fidelity, a number of female friendships. Among them, the most remarkable are the journalist Sophia Paramount, Tania Orloff, niece of the Yellow Shadow, and Miss Ylang-Ylang, omnipotent leader of the Smog Organization. The nature of these relations is, as the case may be, gruff, tender or condescending, but always platonic. The great love of his life is Tania Orloff, but they love each other like Romeo and Juliet, resigned representatives of two rival clans.

=== Bill Ballantine ===
Bill Ballantine, a red haired giant, he is the tireless friend of Bob Morane. Ballantine is 34 years old, he is a chicken farmer in Scotland and a big fan of whiskey ZAT 77. This faithful second, strong, grouchy and tonic, nicknamed his illustrious companion "commander" in reference to a common mission of the Second World War. This is less and less alludedto as the years go by, despite which the nickname continues.

=== L'Ombre Jaune ===
Sworn enemy of Bob Morane, he makes himself known under the identity of Mr. Ming. He is also the descendant of the Ming Dynasty. He nicknamed himself "Yellow Shadow" because, in his relentless battle in the shadows, the yellow of light will follow. Extremely rich, he is at the head of a sprawling organization, the Shin-tan, made up of fanatical and terrifying mercenaries, dacoits (gifted aboriginal killers) and thugs (Indian stranglers of great talent). The Yellow Shadow has created many clones of himself, successively to succeed him, in case of violent death, through a device of conservation and regeneration called the Duplicator.

=== Miss Ylang-Ylang ===
Miss Ylang-Ylang is the leader of SMOG, an international organization of mercenaries and bandits. With a beauty that is both perfect and disturbing, no one knows her real name and has been nicknamed "Ylang-Ylang" because of her favorite fragrance. She is fascinated by Bob Morane, which will give him some trouble. Conversely, Bob Morane is secretly attracted to her.

=== Tania Orloff ===
Tania Orloff is the niece of L'Ombre Jaune who secretly double crosses her uncle to help Bob Morane stop her Uncle's evil schemes of world domination.

=== Sophia Paramount ===
A British Journalist who works for the London Chronicle and friend of Bob Morane battle against the forces of evil

== Publication history ==
=== Origin ===
Bob Morane is a series of novels created in 1953 by the Belgian novelist Henri Vernes. In 1959, the Belgian women's weekly, Femmes d'Aujourd'hui, which publishes a few pages of comics every week, asks Henri Vernes a comic strip story by Bob Morane: "It was Femmes d'Aujourd'hui, a women's weekly, who asked me to do. I said: Why not? And I did it, that's all. "

=== First series ===
Vernes then wrote the scenario of the Firebird, whose design is naturally entrusted to Dino Attanasio, who had already since 1953 produced the interior illustrations of the novels published in the Marabout editions (the covers being designed by Pierre Joubert) that he will realize until 1962.

Cartoonist with a humorous style, Attanasio struggles to establish himself as a realistic draftsman, which generates growing tensions with Henri Vernes, who has declared that Attanasio is the only drawer of Bob Morane with whom he has encountered difficulties: "J send my scripts to the designers and I discover their work at the exit of the album. Except with Attanasio, I never had anything to say ". The two men decided to put an end to their collaboration in 1962 after the realization of the episode The Necklace of Çiva.

Gérald Forton, who also produced some interior illustrations of the novels, continues the drawing of the series in 1962 with the episode La Piste de l'ivoire.

In 1967, in full publication of the episode Les Loups are on the track in Femmes d’Aujourd’hui Gerald Forton disappears while the weekly waits for the last two boards of the current episode. According to Henri Vernes, a version that has long been officially peddled, the draftsman left Belgium for "personal reasons" overnight. According to Gérald Forton, after fourteen years in Belgium, he wanted to return to France, the Belgian climate does not allow him to raise his horses in good conditions, which he had warned the magazine's editors by asking to interrupt the publication the episode in progress for two weeks, the time to settle in France, which was denied. Forton returns, however, to France to settle in a ranch in Montaigu-de-Quercy and abandons Bob Morane.

The writing of Femmes d’Aujourd’hui then make a call to find a replacement able to resume the current episode. An advertising professional will pass on this message to William Vance, to whom he has regularly commissioned illustrations. Vance, who knows the world of Bob Morane well since he was the assistant of Dino Attanasio for which he realized the sketches and inking of the sets of the episode The Necklace of Çiva, agrees to take again the drawing of last two boards of the current episode in the style of Forton. Totally satisfied, the editorial staff of the magazine and Henri Vernes ask William Vance to resume the drawing of the series, which he accepts as long as he can move away from the style of Forton to draw the series according to his own style, which it is granted.

=== The second series ===
On May 22, 1968, the appearance of the episode The Smugglers of the Atom begins in the weekly, drawn by William Vance who will continue the series until (1979). Eager to devote himself to other works, notably his Bruce J. Hawker series, William Vance abandons Bob Morane after the episode The Emperor of Macao.

The publisher of the series, The Lombard proposes to Coria, brother-in-law of William Vance (he is the brother of his wife Petra) and his assistant on Bob Morane for many years, to take over the design of the series, which Henri Vernes agrees even if he does not really appreciate the trait of it: "At first, it was not good, then it improved a little. But I must admit that his drawing is not very steep ". The first episode drawn by Coria, Operation Wolf is published in Tintin since 1979, shortly after the end of the publication of The Emperor of Macau. Coria will draw the series until 2012, when Arnaud de la Croix, editorial director of the Lombard editions, decides to end the series whose sales "were then insufficient or nonexistent".

=== Reboot ===
Le Lombard decides to restart the series in the form of a reboot. The rights of the series are then held by Claude Lefrancq since Henri Vernes sold them to them in 2010 through the company Bob Morane Inc., who agrees. The publisher also seeks the agreement of Henri Vernes, holder of moral rights over his characters, who does not seem hostile to the idea: "I was initially happy that something was finally decided to restart this series because it had been a long time since nothing had been done for her ". It is decided to revive the series without Henri Vernes scenario to modernize since Bob Morane becomes a United Nations peacekeeping mission, at the heart of contemporary geopolitical issues. Gauthier Van Meerbeeck, new editorial director of the Lombard predecessor, by Christophe Bec, who withdraws from the project (he will take over this project to make the scenario of the first two volumes of the Lancaster series published in 2013 and 2014 at Glénat). Gauthier Van Meerbeeck started the project with Luc Brunschwig, who had worked on the project with Christophe Bec, who wants to collaborate with Aurélien Ducoudray. The drawing is entrusted to Dimitri Armand, who then works on the Western Sykes for the Lombard. After reading the first volume, Henri Vernes announces his discontent and asks that the album does not come out, which Gauthier Van Meerbeeck refuses.

Henri Vernes was very hard towards this reboot: "I found the result mediocre", "We completely changed the characters (...) As for the scenario, it is written by people who can not write. I do not count the number of sequences where nothing happens ".

After the publication of two volumes, constituting a complete story, Le Lombard announces that it ends its collaboration with writers Luc Brunschwig and Aurélien Ducoudray indicating that, despite commercial success, there is no "relationship of trust and mutual respect with the authors "since" no dialogue on the unfolding of the narrative could be initiated "and that the series would continue with Dimitri Armand, which the latter confirms by announcing the publication of a new album in 2018, which has not been published.

=== Parody ===
The comics of Bob Marone are a parody of Bob Morane.

== Other Graphic Novels ==
The publisher requested Michel Deligne, Jacques Géron redesign issues Échec à la Main Noire originally produced by Forton, published in the Dutch-language Belgian daily Het Laatste Nieuws, whose scripts were lost which is published a graphic novel by Claude Lefrancq, to which Deligne had lost the rights, in 1992.

The republishing of the first issues of the series by Claude Lefrancq, Dino Attanasio made a final issue in 1994 reworking the adaptation of a novel by Henri Vernes published in 1954, La Galère engloutie.

In 2015, at the request of Éditions Joe, Gérald Forton also wrote, with the help of in the screenplay, a final episode of Bob Morane on a new story not written by Henri Vernes, Dans l'ombre du cartel.

== Comics bibliography ==
- L'oiseau de feu (The Firebird, 1960, artwork by Attanasio, Marabout)
- Le secret de l'Antarctique (The Secret of the Antarctic, 1962, artwork by Attanasio, Marabout)
- Les tours de cristal (The Towers of Crystal, 1962, artwork by Attanasio, Marabout); illustrated by Dino Attanasio. It has 60 pages. The French language edition of this book was published in black and white in serial form throughout 1961 in the magazine Femmes d'Aujourd'hui. It was republished in 1962 in a modified form, with colors, re-drawn characters and scenery and a more modern look for the future sequences, then again in the 1980s and finally in 1990 in the original 1961 magazine style. An English-language version (Bob Morane and the Towers of Crystal) was serialised between 1965 and 1966 in the long-running British comic magazine Buster.
- Le collier de Civa (The Necklace of Shiva, 1963, artwork by Attanasio, Marabout)
- Bob Morane contre la terreur verte (The Green Terror, 1963, artwork by Attanasio, Marabout)
- Le mystère de la Zone "Z" (The Mystery of Zone Z, 1964, artwork by Forton, Marabout)
- La vallée des crotales (The Valley of the Rattlesnakes, 1964, artwork by Forton, Marabout)
- L'épée du Paladin (The Sword of the Paladin, 1967, artwork by Forton, Dargaud)
- Le secret des 7 temples (The Secret of the 7 Temples, 1968, artwork by Forton, Dargaud)

Cover of Opération "Chevalier Noir" (1969) by Vance

- Opération "Chevalier Noir" (Operation "Black Knight", 1969, artwork by Vance, Dargaud)
- Les poupées de l'Ombre Jaune (The Puppets of the Yellow Shadow, 1970, artwork by Vance, Dargaud)
- Les fils du dragon (The Sons of the Dragon, 1971, artwork by Vance, Dargaud)
- Les yeux du brouillard (The Eyes in the Fog, 1971, artwork by Vance, Dargaud)
- La prisonnière de l'Ombre Jaune (The Prisoner of the Yellow Shadow, 1972, artwork by Vance, Dargaud)
- L'archipel de la terreur (The Archipelago of Terror, 1972, artwork by Vance, Dargaud)
- La ville de nulle part (Nowhere City, 1973, artwork by Vance, Dargaud)
- L'œil du samouraï (The Eye of The Samurai, 1973, artwork by Vance, Dargaud)
- Les contrebandiers de l'atome (The Atom Smugglers, 1974, artwork by Vance, Dargaud)
- Guérilla à Tumbaga (Guerilla in Tumbaga, 1974, artwork by Vance, Dargaud)
- Les géants de Mu (The Giants of Mu, 1975, artwork by Vance, Lombard)
- Panne sèche à Serado (Out of Gas in Serrado, 1975, artwork by Vance, Lombard)
- Les sept croix de plomb (The Seven Lead Crosses, 1976, artwork by Vance, Lombard)
- Les sortilèges de l'ombre jaune (The Spells of the Yellow Shadow, 1976, artwork by Vance, Lombard)
- Le temple des dinosaures (The Temple of the Dinosaurs, 1977, artwork by Vance with Coria, Lombard)
- Les bulles de l'ombre jaune (The Bubbles of the Yellow Shadow, 1978, artwork by Vance, Lombard)
- L'empreinte du crapaud (The Mark of the Toad, 1979, artwork by Vance, Lombard)
- L'empereur de Macao (The Emperor of Macau, 1980, artwork by Vance, Lombard)
- Opération Wolf (1980, artwork by Coria, Dargaud)
- Commando épouvante (Terror Commando, 1981, artwork by Coria, Lombard)
- Les guerriers de l'ombre jaune (The Warriors of the Yellow Shadow, 1982, artwork by Coria, Lombard)
- Service secrets soucoupes (Secret Service Saucers, 1982, artwork by Coria, Lombard)
- Le président ne mourra pas (The President Will Not Die, 1983, artwork by Coria, Lombard)
- Les chasseurs de dinosaures (The Dinosaur Hunters, 1984, artwork by Coria, Lombard)
- Une rose pour l'ombre jaune (A Rose for the Yellow Shadow, 1984, artwork by Coria, Lombard)
- La guerre des baleines (The War of the Whales, 1985, artwork by Coria, Lombard)
- Le réveil du Mamantu (The Mamantu Awakens, 1986, artwork by Coria, Lombard)
- Les fourmis de l'ombre jaune (The Ants of the Yellow Shadow, 1987, artwork by Coria, Lombard)
- Le dragon de Fenstone (The Dragon of Fenstone, 1988, artwork by Coria, Lombard)
- Les otages de l'ombre (The Hostages of the Yellow Shadow, 1988, artwork by Coria, Lombard)
- Snake (1989, artwork by Coria, Lombard)
- Le tigre des lagunes (The Lagoon Tiger, 1989, artwork by Coria, Lombard)
- Le temple des crocodiles (The Temple of the Crocodiles, 1990, artwork by Coria, Lombard)
- Le masque de jade (The Jade Mask, 1990, artwork by Coria, Lombard)
- Trois petits singes (Three Little Monkeys, 1991, artwork by Coria, Lombard)
- Le jade de Séoul (The Jade From Seoul, 1992, artwork by Coria, Lombard)
- La cité des rêves (The City of Dreams, 1993, artwork by Coria, Le Lombard)
- L'arbre de l'Eden (The Tree From Eden, 1994, artwork by Coria, Le Lombard)
- Un parfum d'Ylang-Ylang (A Scent of Ylang-Ylang, 1995, artwork by Coria, Le Lombard)
- Alias M.D.O. (1996, artwork by Coria, Le Lombard)
- L'anneau de Salomon (Solomon's Ring, 1997, artwork by Coria, Le Lombard)
- La vallée des brontosaures (The Valley of the Brontosaurus, 1997, artwork by Coria, Le Lombard)
- La revanche de l'ombre jaune (The Revenge of the Yellow Shadow, 1998, artwork by Coria, Le Lombard)
- Le chatiment de l'ombre jaune (The Punishment of the Yellow Shadow , 1999, artwork by Coria, Le Lombard)
- Yang=Yin (2000, artwork by Coria, Le Lombard)
- Le pharaon de Venise (The Pharaoh of Venice , 2001, artwork by Coria, Le Lombard)
- L'oeil de l'iguanodon (Eye of the Iguanodon, 2002, artwork by Coria, Le Lombard)
- Les déserts d'Amazonie (The Deserts of the Amazon, 2003, artwork by Coria, Le Lombard)
- Retour au Crétacé (Back to the Cretaceous, 2003, artwork by Coria Coria & Loup, Le Lombard)
- La panthère des hauts plateaux (Panther of the High Sierras, 2004, artwork by Coria, Le Lombard)
- Les murailles d'Ananké (The Walls of Ananke, 2004, artwork by Leclercq, Ananké)
- Les périls d'Ananké (2004, artwork by Leclercq, Miklo)
- L'exterminateur (2005, artwork by Coria, Le Lombard)
- Les larmes du soleil (2005, artwork by Coria, Le Lombard)
- La guerre du pacifique n'aura pas lieu (2006, artwork by Coria, Le Lombard)
- La guerre du Pacifique n'aura pas lieu 2 (2007, artwork by Coria, Le Lombard)
- Les berges du temps (2008, artwork by Coria, Le Lombard)
- Les dents du tigre 1 (2009, artwork by Coria, Le Lombard)
- Les dents du tigre 2 (2010, artwork by Coria, Le Lombard)
- El Matador (2011, artwork by Coria, Le Lombard)
- Sur la piste de Fawcett (2012, artwork by Coria, Le Lombard)
