= Paul Cuvelier =

Belgian comics artist and painter

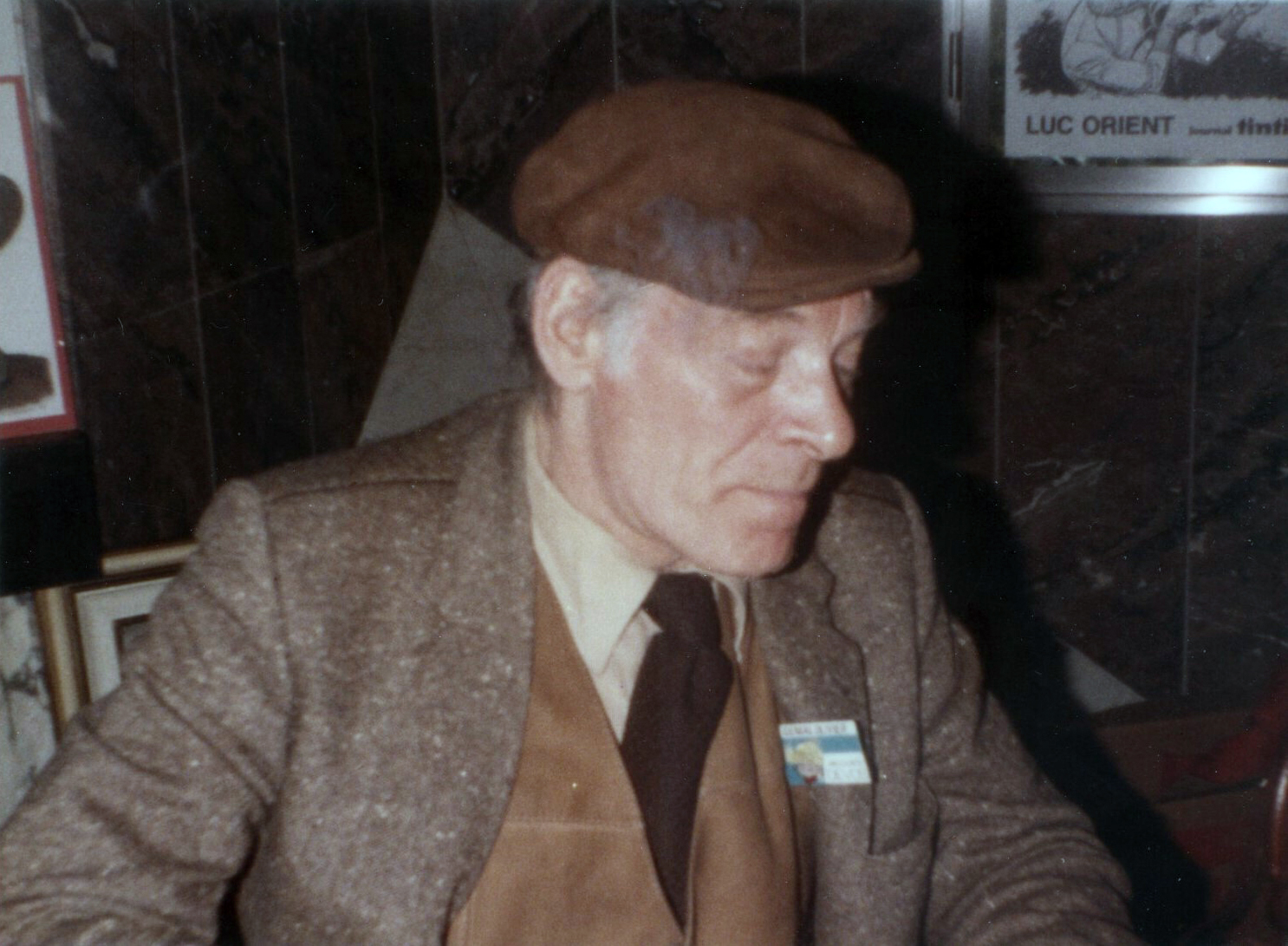
- Paul Cuvelier, 1978
- Born: 22 November 1923 Lens, Belgium
- Died: 5 August 1978 (aged 54) Mont-sur-Marchienne
- Notable works: Corentin; Line; Epoxy
- Awards: full list

Paul Cuvelier (22 November 1923 – 5 August 1978) was a Belgian comics artist best known for the comic series Corentin, published by Le Lombard, which first appeared in the first issue of Tintin magazine.

== Biography ==
Paul Cuvelier was born in Lens, Belgium in 1923. He was the third of seven children of doctor Charles Cuvelier, who was an amateur painter. From his early youth on, his main passion was drawing, and he had his first work published in Le Petit Vingtième when he was only seven years old. After studying Latin and Greek in Enghien, he began taking art classes at the academy of Mons for a few months, but left when his teacher declared that there was nothing left that he could teach him. He made his debut in the youth magazine Bravo in 1946 with the Western comic Tom Colby, written by Hergé and Edgar Pierre Jacobs. He was one of the first artists to be contacted for the new Tintin magazine, which started in 1946.

For Tintin, he created his main comics series, Corentin. Trained as a painter, Cuvelier was recognized by his peers as one of the most talented artists, but his series only achieved limited success, and Cuvelier spent his whole career alternating between painting and comics. His main interest was the human body, but the catholic context and juvenile audience of Tintin limited his expressive possibilities. Corentin was his longest lasting series, but with only seven albums published in a span of 25 years, it failed to attract a large and faithful audience; his other series were even more short-lived.

In 1968, he was able to combine his passion for the female nude and his gift for drawing comics in Epoxy, a fantasy about the Greek gods written by Jean Van Hamme, which is considered to be one of the first adult comics of Europe.

Ultimately, the lack of commercial success and the burden on his creativity of repeatedly drawing the same figures, inherent to the creation of comics, wore Cuvelier out, and from 1973 until his death 5 years later, he devoted his time to painting. He died in 1978 in Mont-sur-Marchienne.

== Bibliography ==
- Le Canyon mystérieux, 1 album, 1947, story by Hergé and Edgar Pierre Jacobs. Editions du Berger
- Corentin, 7 albums, 1950–1974, stories by Jean Van Melkebeke, Cuvelier, Greg, Acar, and Jean Van Hamme. Le Lombard and Dargaud
- Epoxy, 1 album, 1968, erotic story by Jean Van Hamme. Éric Losfeld
- Flamme d'argent, 3 albums, 1965–1981, story by Greg. Le Lombard, Dargaud, and Cygne
- Line, 5 albums, 1966–1985, story by Greg. Le Lombard, Dargaud, and Bédéscope
- Wapi, 2 albums, 1969–1981, story by Benoît and Acar. Le Lombard and Dargaud

== Awards ==
- 1974: Award for best realistic artwork at the Prix Saint-Michel, Brussels
