= Dino Attanasio =

Belgian author of comics (1925–2026)

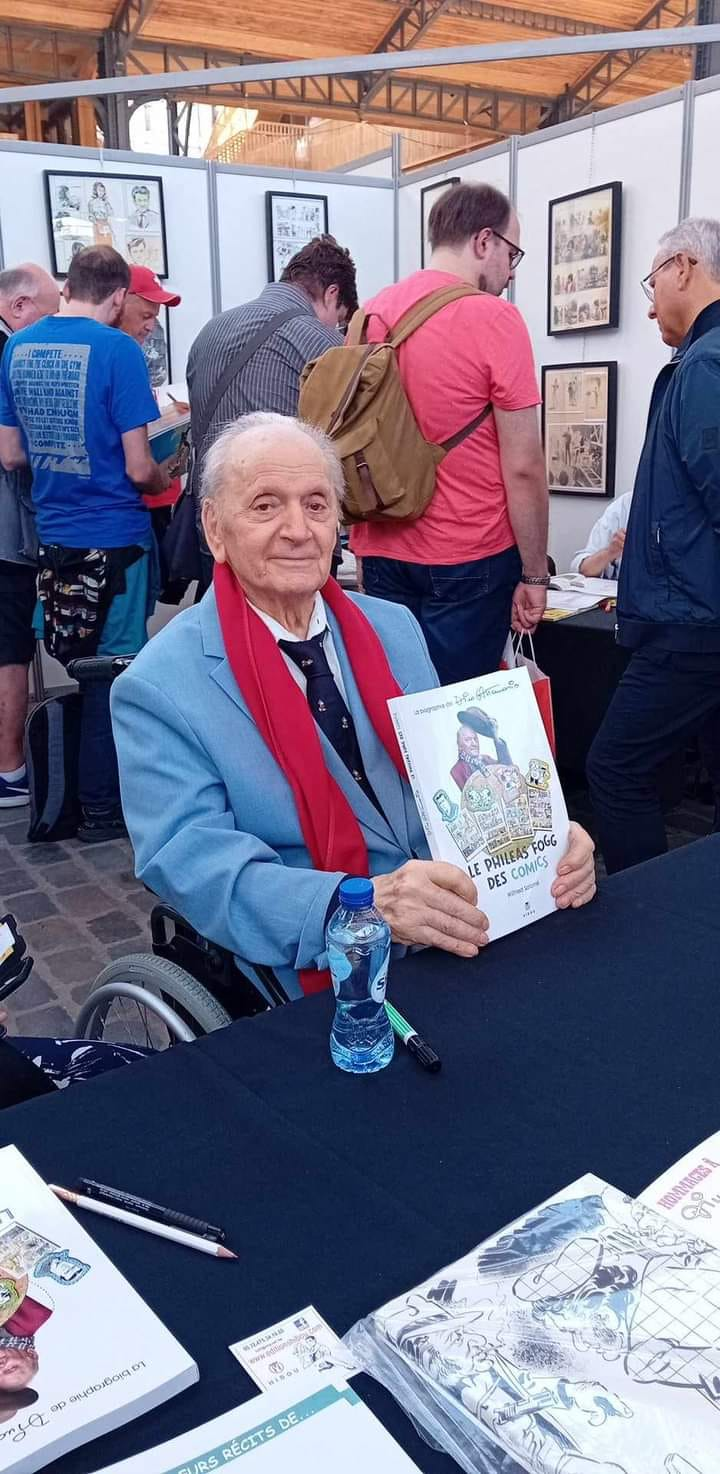
- Attanasio at the 2024 Brussels Comicstrip festival
- Born: Edoardo Attanasio; 8 May 1925 Milan, Italy
- Died: 17 January 2026 (aged 100)
- Notable works: Bob Morane; Modeste et Pompon

Signature
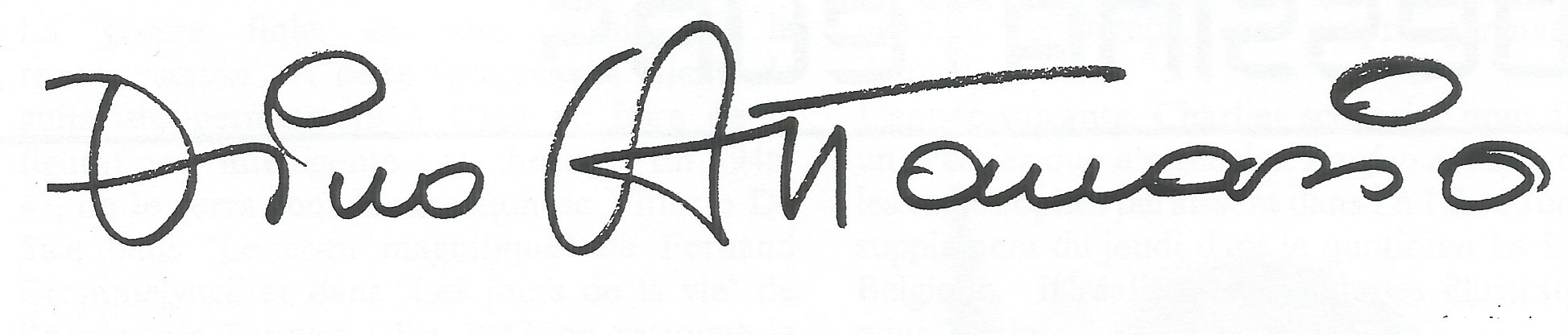

Dino Attanasio (real name Edoardo Attanasio; 8 May 1925 – 17 January 2026) was an Italian-born Belgian comics writer and illustrator.

== Life and career ==
Edoardo Attanasio was born in Milan, Italy on 8 May 1925, to Clelia (née Montesanti) and Savino Attanasio. He attended the Accademia di Brera in Milan. He was introduced to comics by his maternal grandmother.

In the 1940s, after studies at the Academy of Arts of Milan, Attanasio started to work in illustration and animation. By the time he moved to Belgium in 1948 with his brother Gianni, also an artist, he had worked on an animated film and had illustrated 10 comics. Shortly after his arrival, the young artist got in contact with Tintin magazine, for which he drew some illustrations, and decided to devote himself to comics. In the 1950s, he published Criche e Croc in the Italian magazine Il Giornalino and Fanfan et Polo in La Libre Belgique with scripts by Jean-Michel Charlier and then René Goscinny. At that time, he also worked for Spirou magazine with some contributions to Les Belles Histoires de l'Oncle Paul. In 1954, he published "Pastis et Dynamite" in Line with Greg.

He became popular in the late 1950s and 1960s thanks to The Adventures of Signor Spaghetti, a comic series he created with Goscinny, published in Tintin after 1957. From 1959 à 1962 he published in Femmes d'aujourd'hui the comics series version of Les Aventures de Bob Morane, a series of novels written by Henri Vernes and for which he made some illustrations and art covers in the Marabout Junior collection. However, he is replaced for this job by Gérald Forton. Then, from 1959 to 1968, he took over the series Modeste et Pompon, originally created by Franquin.

After his departure from Tintin in 1968, Attanasio started working for the Dutch market, creating the series Johnny Goodbye with Martin Lodewijk and Patty Klein for Eppo and Pep, with Bandoneon (with Delporte) in Pep and with De Macaroni's (with Dick Matena), but also for Italian magazines with "Ambroise et Gino" in Corriere dei piccoli. From 1974 to 1986 he took on the Spaghetti series again in Formule 1, published in albums by Archers. In 1991 Attanasio created a comic adaptation of Boccaccio's literary classic Decameron with his son, published by Lefrancq. In 1994, he took over the series Bob Morane for one story only. After then, new works were made rarer, and some publishers rediscovered some of his works, like Carnets de route in 1999 by Point Image and from 2002 some shorts stories originally published in Tintin, by Loup.

== Death ==
Attanasio died on 17 January 2026, at the age of 100.

== Publications ==
Dino Attanasio drawing Johnny Goodbye

- Bob Morane (5 tomes, edited by Marabout) 1960–1963
  - Bob Morane: Les tours de cristal 1961
- Modeste et Pompon (11 tomes) 1964–1968
- Spaghetti (24 tomes) 1961–2001
- Ambroise et Gino (1 tome) 1979
- Bandonéon (2 tomes) 1979
- Flash-back et la 4e dimension (1 tome) 1979
- Soleil des damnés (Le) (1 tome) 1983
- Il était une fois dans l'oued (1 tome) 1984
- Bob Morane (1 tome, edited by Deligne) 1979
- Johnny Goodbye (7 tomes) 1979–2004
- Bob Morane (Divers, 6 tomes) 1985–2007
- Bob Morane (edited by Lefrancq, 7 tomes) 1989–1995
- Décaméron (Le) (1 tome) 1991
- Fanfan et Polo (1 tome) 1991
- Jimmy Stone (1 tome) 1997
- Attanasio (3 tomes) 1999–2006
- Bd story (2 tomes) 2002
- Meilleurs récits de... (Les) (4 tomes) 2002–2006
- Candida (1 tome) 2006
