= L'enfant penchée =

Graphic novel in Les Cités Obscures series

L'enfant penchée, 1st edition cover

L'enfant penchée (literally, The Leaning Child) is a graphic novel by Belgian comic artists François Schuiten and Benoît Peeters with photographs by Marie-Françoise Plissart, and the sixth volume of their ongoing Les Cités Obscures series. It was first published in serialized form in the Franco-Belgian comics magazine À Suivre (#193-212), and as a complete French volume first in 1996 by Casterman.

Although subsequently also published in at least Dutch and German, for many years, L'enfant penchée remained unpublished in English. However, in March 2014 Alaxis Press published the official English translation under the title The Leaning Girl.

== Background ==
L'enfant penchée was originally based on the short illustrated children's book Mary la penchée (1995) by Schuiten & Peeters. With L'enfant penchée, they elaborated on the same story.

== Plot ==
Mary von Rathen, daughter of an industrial magnate family of the city of Mylos, lives a willful and fanciful childhood, in sheer contrast to her pragmatic and businesslike father and brother. During a family trip to the city of Alaxis, as the von Rathens ride a roller coaster, the skies darken and the ground shakes inexplicably. Immediately after, Mary's entire body begins leaning heavily to one side involuntarily, rendering her unable to stand up straight without support. This unique condition leaves Mary a social outcast, disdained by all for what they see as attention-seeking behavior.

Running away from boarding school, Mary joins a traveling circus, garnering fame over several years as a gravity-defying tightrope walker and gymnast. A newspaper editor takes notice of her condition and advises her to visit the renowned scientist and inventor Axel Wappendorf in the hope of seeking a cure. Mary's father, identifying Mary from newspaper coverage, immediately departs Mylos to follow her trail.

Mary finds Wappendorf at the Mont Michelson observatory, where he and a team of researchers are constructing a crewed spacecraft to attempt spaceflight to a theoretical planet called "Antinea". The darkening of the skies years ago, as well as Mary's condition, prove to Wappendorf that Antinea's gravitational pull is acting upon their own world. Mary's father arrives at Mont Michelson just as the spacecraft launches with Wappendorf, and the stowaway Mary, on board; at the shock of this realization, he suffers a fatal heart attack.

Mary and Wappendorf land not on Antinea, but in a subterranean lake filled with an endless expanse of massive, vibrating spheres. As they pass by the many spheres, Mary's leaning begins to diminish, while Wappendorf begins to lean as Mary previously did. Mary finds one sphere among all the rest where she is able to stand up straight.

Meanwhile, Wappendorf meets Jules Verne, who attests that he is on an expedition to Wappendorf's world, having traveled from his own world using his imagination and inspired by a painting by the artist Augustin Desombres. Upon seeing that one of the spheres has cracked into fragments, Wappendorf realizes that the two worlds are governed by the same force, and that Mary's condition was caused by a disruption in the connection.

In several sequences illustrated using photos rather than inked art, Desombres, a Parisian 19th-century painter, spurns the criticism of the art world and departs to the Aubrac countryside in solitude. There, he finds a lone, deserted estate in the wilderness, and begins compulsively creating new paintings on the house's walls. Without understanding his inspiration, he recreates scenes of Wappendorf's spacecraft and the cave filled with spheres, depicting one of them as damaged. While struggling to add a female figure to the painting, he passes through the walls of the house and emerges on the same sphere where Mary waits, where he transforms into an ink drawing version of himself. The two of them embrace in spontaneous passion.

Wappendorf deduces that Desombres's paintings have power over the connection between worlds. Over Mary's protests, Wappendorf convinces Desombres to return to his own world, where, despite his regret in leaving Mary, he repairs the damaged sphere in his painting and restores the worlds to normal. One of Desombres's hands remains as an ink drawing, as proof of what he experienced.

Mary accepts the responsibility of succeeding her father among the Mylos oligarchy, and becomes an influential figure in enacting liberalizing reforms credited with restoring the "grandeur" of the city.

== Differences between editions ==
L'enfant penchée, later edition

== Editions ==
=== In French ===
- L'enfant penchée, 1996, Casterman
- L'enfant penchée, 2007, Casterman
