= La Tour (comics) =

Graphic novel in Les Cités Obscures series

La Tour, cover

La Tour is a graphic novel by Belgian comic artists François Schuiten and Benoît Peeters, the third volume of their ongoing Les Cités Obscures series. It was first published in serialized form in the Franco-Belgian comics magazine À Suivre (#96-106), and as a complete volume first in 1987 by Casterman. In English, it was published as The Tower (Stories of the Fantastic) in 1993 by NBM Publishing, and as The Tower in 2022 in a new translation by IDW Publishing.

== Background ==
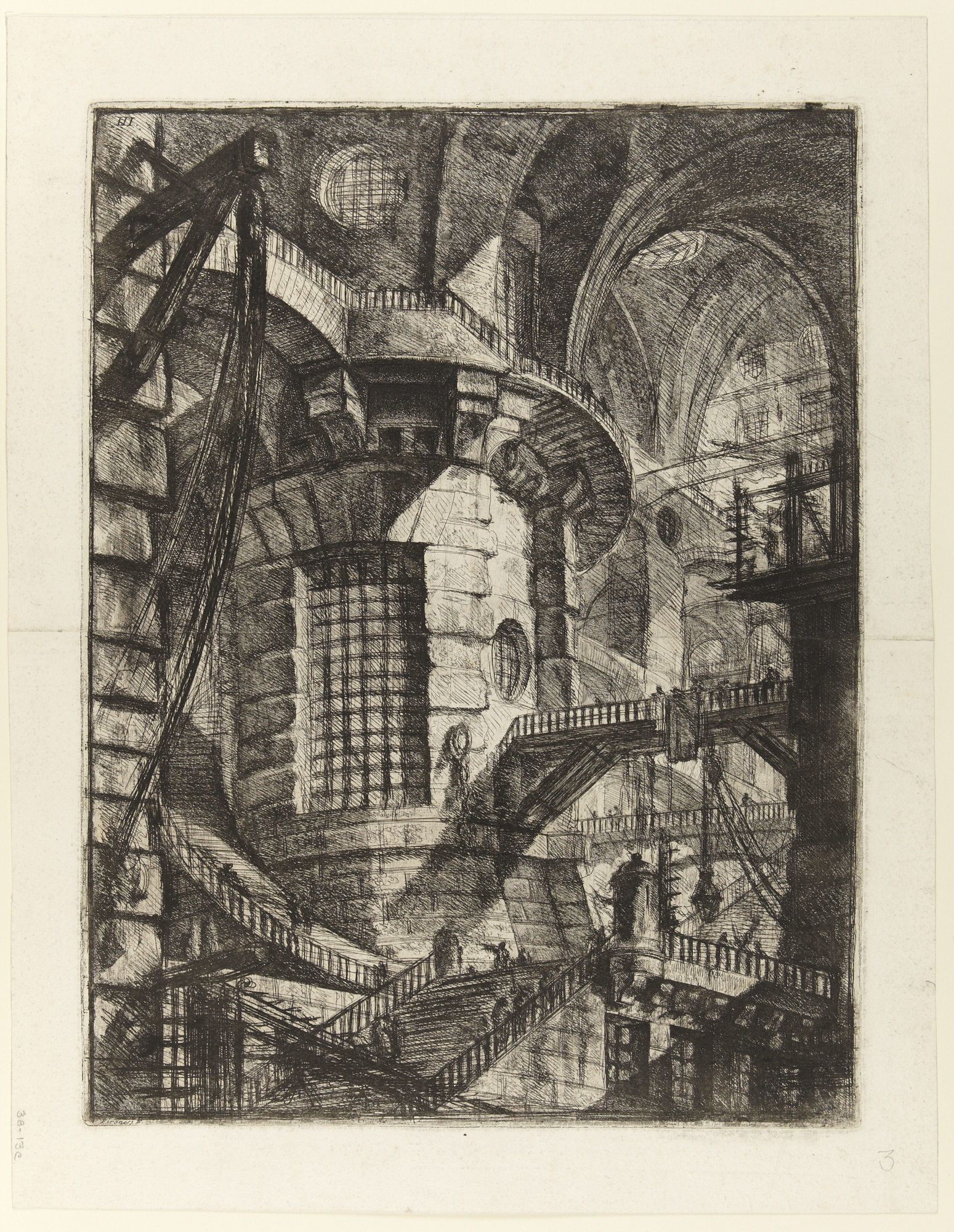
The Round Tower, plate III of Piranesi's Imaginary Prisons etchings, is an example of inspiration for The Tower's artwork.

The time is about 400 AT (After the Tower), which is the number of years since the Tower's ongoing construction has begun. As the story takes place centuries before the other Obscure Cities albums, The Tower exhibits the least connection to steampunk fiction out of the entire series. Instead, the Tower's design, architecture, and clothing show Medieval influences of time periods between the 10th and the 15th centuries, particularly technology and architecture of the segue between Medieval Gothic art and the early Renaissance period, as well as Pre-Romanesque, Romanesque, Gothic, and early Renaissance art. The technology used is therefore more reminiscent of clockpunk.

The main character, Giovanni Battista, is explicitly named after Giovanni Battista Piranesi, whose Imaginary Prisons series of etchings is cited as the main influence on the book's artwork. Schuiten illustrated Battista based on Orson Welles playing Falstaff in Chimes at Midnight. The IDW edition of the book makes the further claim that, during the creative process for The Tower, Welles personally posed as a live model for Schuiten's artwork, though this story is "collected by Isidore Louis," a fictional archivist, and likely gestures at the meta narrative Schuiten and Peeters have crafted around The Obscure Cities themselves being real.

== Plot ==
Giovanni Battista delivers a theatrical monologue, foreshadowing the story to come.

Giovanni has been employed for many years as one of many maintainers of an enormous stone edifice called only the Tower, permanently stationed alone within one part of its frame, where he is responsible for repairing failing masonry by perilously navigating beams and columns. Even as Giovanni diligently performs his job, working long days with little rest and leaving himself disheveled, he notices that his fellow maintainers and the inspectors overseeing them have abandoned their duties. Unable to keep up with a mounting rate of failures, he decides to lodge complaints with his superiors at the Base of the Tower.

Climbing down, Giovanni finds one maintainer who has succumbed to paranoia, and another long dead. He builds a parachute to safely descend the tower, but is carried higher by an updraft. After crash-landing, he is rescued by an older man named Elias and a younger woman named Milena, who reside in a newer, bustling community of Tower-dwellers. Elias earns money by charging admission to learn about the Tower from his collection of books, artifacts, and paintings. The paintings, which purport to depict the nobility residing at the Base, the Pioneers still at work constructing the Tower at its top, as well as the Tower's past and future, are the first coloured artwork thus far among otherwise black-and-white line art.

Elias, who believes that the Tower's deterioration is accelerating and that its very conception was unplanned and misguided, teaches Giovanni all he knows about the Tower and prophesies that Giovanni will discover the Tower's secret at its top. Milena is charmed by the romantically inexperienced Giovanni, and they fall in love. Together, she and Giovanni use a secret passage to glimpse the centre of the Tower, a dark void of unknown depth; Milena resolves to leave with Giovanni on his prophesied journey.

Sent by Elias on a forbidden path out of the community, Giovanni and Milena travel through myriad regions of the Tower, each abandoned in the ever-upward construction. They find a ransacked community full of corpses, and a lone survivor zealously guarding a machine that he cannot operate or explain. Finding even the very top of the Tower abandoned, Giovanni and Milena are left dispirited, but find solace in each other.

Angered by the Pioneers' desertion, Giovanni follows their trail down the hollowed centre of the Tower. Giovanni and Milena find heaps of hastily discarded valuables, but Giovanni notices that the Pioneers refused to part with their paintings, only leaving behind the empty frames. By operating a giant pulley, the two manage to descend the centre of the Tower; encountering Elias on their way down, Giovanni lies about the Pioneers to comfort him.

Reaching the bottom, Giovanni finds a coloured, torn scrap of a painting depicting a dying soldier, and is suddenly encouraged; Milena explains that Elias's paintings even have the power to heal the sick.

The two exit the Tower into a fully coloured world where they alone are drawn in black-and-white. An unidentified army forcibly conscripts them both into an ongoing battle. Though he has never seen the bayonets the soldiers carry, Giovanni quickly adapts to the fighting, and kills an enemy soldier, creating the same scene shown on the painting scrap. Giovanni rallies the soldiers on his side even as the sudden collapse of the Tower nearly routs their forces.

Giovanni briefly speaks of winning the battle and entering a new world, but stops his story out of sudden melancholy. Nothing is shown of subsequent events except a full-length, framed portrait of Giovanni, fully-coloured, groomed and in magisterial robes, accompanied by not Milena but a statue bearing her name.

== Editions ==
=== In French ===
- La Tour (softcover edition), 1987, Casterman
- La Tour (hardcover edition), 1987, Casterman
- La Tour, 1993, Casterman
- La Tour, 2008, Casterman

=== In English ===
- The Tower (Stories of the Fantastic), 1993, NBM Publishing
- The Tower, 2022, IDW Publishing
