= Les murailles de Samaris =

Graphic novel in Les Cités Obscures series

Les murailles de Samaris, cover

Les murailles de Samaris is a graphic novel by François Schuiten and Benoît Peeters, the first volume of their ongoing Les Cités Obscures series. It was first published in serialized form in 1982 in the Franco-Belgian comics magazine À Suivre (#53-56), and as a complete volume first in 1983 by Casterman. In English, it was published as The Great Walls of Samaris (Stories of the fantastic) as a serial in Heavy Metal from November 1984 to March 1985, then in 1987 as a complete volume by NBM Publishing.

In 1988, Schuiten and Peeters took the opportunity of the second French edition to revise their story, adding content tying into subsequent Les Cités Obscures publications, and clarifying ambiguities of the original. In 2007, a new French printing was further appended with Les Mysterères de Pȃhry, a collection of four previously published story fragments relating to the city of Pâhry. In 2017, IDW Publishing released a new English translation of the revised French edition, re-titled Samaris, and newly translating the appended content as The Mysteries of Pâhry.

== Plot ==
The city of Xhystos is gripped by rumours about the distant city of Samaris, from which all Xhystos diplomatic missions have failed to return. The ruling council of Xhystos offers Franz Bauer wealth and power to investigate Samaris, promising an uneventful mission, though Franz's friends and girlfriend are certain that he, too, would never return.

To reach Samaris, Franz travels for many weeks by train, aviation, and boat. Franz spends weeks more documenting unremarkable observations in Samaris, meeting a woman named Carla every day. The governor of Samaris denies the arrival of any previous envoys. Franz is increasingly disturbed by many oddities: a constant whistling noise with no obvious source, suspicious behaviour from his hotel's desk clerk, inconsistencies in the city's layout, doors and windows that lead nowhere, the absence of children, and the unchanging daily routine of the city's inhabitants. When he finally decides to leave Samaris with Carla, she implores him to depart by himself.

Attempting to break into another hotel room, Franz discovers that all buildings and streets in Samaris are actually mechanized façades automated on rails, and that all the people he met were lifeless dummies. He falls into an engine room and finds a book that seemingly describes the nature of Samaris, comparing the city to a carnivorous plant that sustains itself by capturing visitors and creating "effig[ies]" in their image.

Franz escapes Samaris and returns to Xhystos on foot. In the revised ending, Franz cannot prove his identity, find any of his associates, or even recognize the city, whose very architectural style has changed. He is assaulted by a vision of Carla, and, when he is finally granted an audience with the council by mentioning Samaris, he sees the council members as lifeless cutouts. As the council demands answers about his mission from an age long past, Franz declares Xhystos a fake and sets out to return to Samaris.

== Editions ==
=== In French ===
- Les murailles de Samaris, 1984, Casterman
- Les murailles de Samaris (revised edition), 1988, Casterman
- Les murailles de Samaris, 1993, Casterman
- Les murailles de Samaris (including Les Mysterères de Pȃhry), 2007, Casterman

=== In English (first edition) ===
- The Great Walls of Samaris (Stories of the fantastic), 1987, NBM Publishing
- The Walls of Samaris, 1984-1985 Heavy Metal

=== In English (revised edition) ===
- Samaris (including The Mysteries of Pâhry), 2017, IDW Publishing
