= La route d'Armilia =

Graphic novel in Les Cités Obscures series

La route d'Armilia, 2nd edition, 1988 (note hand-lettered title below)

La route d'Armilia is a graphic novel by Belgian comic artists François Schuiten and Benoît Peeters, the fourth volume of their ongoing Les Cités Obscures series. It was first published in an early, notably different version in Danish as Vejen Til Armilia in 1987, in its final form in the Franco-Belgian comics magazine À Suivre (#123), and as a standalone French album first in 1988 by Casterman. Although subsequently also published in at least Dutch and German, La route d'Armilia remains unpublished in English as of 2008; however, an English translation authorized by Casterman is available on the internet as a .txt file (see External links below). An unofficial digital edition (available online) has been produced by lettering French scans with this English manuscript.

== Editions ==
=== In French ===
- La route d'Armilia, 1988, Casterman (type font on cover and inside)
- La route d'Armilia, 1988, Casterman (hand-lettered font on cover and inside)
- La route d'Armilia, 1993, Casterman
