= La fièvre d'Urbicande =

Graphic novel in Les Cités Obscures series

La fièvre d'Urbicande, cover

La fièvre d'Urbicande is a graphic novel by Belgian comic artists François Schuiten and Benoît Peeters, the second volume of their ongoing Les Cités Obscures series. It was first published in serialized form starting in 1983 in the Franco-Belgian comics magazine À Suivre (#68–73), and as a complete volume first in 1985 by Casterman, winning the Angoulême International Comics Festival Prize for Best Album in the same year. In English, it was published as Fever in Urbicand (Cities of the Fantastic) in 1990 by NBM Publishing.

In 2008, Casterman published an expanded edition appended with "La légende du réseau", an illustrated text, and "La dernière vision d'Eugen Robick", an epilogue. The entirety of the 2008 edition is collected in Book 1 of the intégrale edition of Les Cités Obscures, a hardcover compilation published in 2017, which is yet further appended with Urbicande Opéra, a libretto adaptation of the story. This supplemental content has not been published in English.

Casterman published a newly coloured edition in 2020, and IDW Publishing released a new English translation of the coloured edition in 2022 as The Fever in Urbicande.

== Plot ==
In a lengthy, impassioned letter, Eugen Robick, "Urbatect" of the city of Urbicande, implores the Urbicande High Commission to approve the Bridge III construction project. Out of three planned bridges connecting Urbicande's North and South Bank neighbourhoods, only Bridge III remains unbuilt. Robick, a proponent of symmetry in architecture and urban planning, has already orchestrated years of transformative redevelopment on the South Bank, but laments this far outstripping the urban decay of the North, and dreams of yet more grand renovations to bring the city into aesthetic balance. The Commission denies his plans, to limit freedom of movement between the North and South Banks.

One day, workers unearth a small, unbreakable cubic frame from a construction site and bring it to Robick's office. The frame rapidly grows into a cubic lattice, expanding in both tessellation and scale and passing directly through solid objects. It soon emerges into the open outside of Robick's home. Robick's acquiescent attitude towards the lattice alienates the alarmist Thomas, his friend and political ally.

The lattice's encroachment ferments social unrest, with the Commission attempting in vain to suppress its presence. Sophie, Robick's neighbor and the madam of a brothel, forms an anti-establishment political movement with Robick as figurehead. Though Robick does not join the movement, he is jailed for several days as a political prisoner. Upon his release, he disappoints his newfound followers by urging against action.

The lattice spreads over nearly all of Urbicande after only weeks, then stops growing. It now bridges the North and South Banks, permitting unchecked illegal crossings. Sophie invites Robick to visit the North Bank with her, over his protests and aversion, and they both experience life in the squalid, yet lively, neighbourhood for the first time.

Now a fixture of the city landscape, the lattice becomes a foundation for new construction and a nexus for travel, commerce, and leisure, permitting citizens to form new friendships and enterprises. The Commissioners resign in the face of such sweeping social change. Robick becomes detached from the outside world, preoccupied with mapping the new cityscape. After turning down Sophie's entreaty to run for political office against Thomas, Robick grows apart from her.

The following year, the lattice suddenly resumes its growth, and all the buildings, thoroughfares, and public infrastructure supported by its frame catastrophically collapse. Amidst the ensuing turmoil, Thomas secures leadership of the Commission. Even as the lattice grows beyond the city limits to gargantuan proportions, its grip on the public remains unabated. Forced to recant his anti-lattice policies, Thomas seeks Robick's services in overseeing a man-made replacement lattice. Robick rejects Thomas's plan, but, even as the construction proceeds without him, Robick begins chiseling a copy of the original frame by hand, believing that the lattice will one day return.

=== Supplemental content ===
In 1985, a limited-edition booklet, Le Mystere d'Urbicande, was distributed independently from the album. The booklet is presented as an in-universe monograph by a highly skeptical scholar, adulterated with handwritten notes from Robick. The printed passages denounce the veracity of the events depicted in the album, while Robick's notes vehemently refute the author's arguments.

The booklet hints at fallout from the events of the album, describing widespread death and madness in various cities across the same continent, which barricaded themselves for reasons lost to history. The booklet is illustrated with drawings of the lattice as allegedly witnessed in far-flung regions and extreme environments. Urbicande itself is stated to have been destroyed by an unknown cataclysm.

The 1996 book Le Guide des Cités further extends this narrative, stating that survivors of Urbicande's destruction later recreated the city in its entirety elsewhere, while the original city remains in ruins.

"La légende du réseau" reproduces portions of Le Mystere d'Urbicande, speculating that the story of the album ends abruptly due to the sudden destruction of Urbicande. This text also presents theories for the nature of the lattice, based in chemistry, psychology, literary allusion, and theology.

In "La dernière vision d'Eugen Robick", a much older Robick visits the real-world city of Brasília, and is interviewed on television as an architectural celebrity. The lattice rises out of the ground, startling the locals, and Robick declares his belief finally vindicated.

== Editions ==
=== In French ===
- La fièvre d'Urbicande, 1985, Casterman
- La fièvre d'Urbicande, 1993, Casterman
- La fièvre d'Urbicande, 1996, Casterman
- La fièvre d'Urbicande, 2002, Casterman
- La fièvre d'Urbicande (colour), 2020, Casterman

=== In English ===
- Fever in Urbicand (Cities of the Fantastic), 1990, NBM Publishing
- The Fever in Urbicande (colour), 2022, IDW Publishing
