= Les Cités obscures =

Graphic novel series by Schuiten and Peeters

- Cover of album 5, Brüsel (1992)
- Created by: François Schuiten; Benoît Peeters

Publication information
- Publisher: Casterman; NBM Publishing; Alaxis Press; IDW Publishing
Title(s)
Les murailles de Samaris
La fièvre d'Urbicande
La Tour
La route d'Armilia
Brüsel
L'enfant penchée
L'ombre d'un homme
La frontière invisible
La Théorie du grain de sable
Souvenirs de l'Eternel présent
Le retour du capitaine Nemo
- Formats: Original material for the series has been published as a strip in the comics anthology(s) À Suivre and a set of graphic novels.
- Original language: French
- Genre: Political, psychological, steampunk
- Publication date: 1983

Creative team
- Writer(s): Benoît Peeters
- Artist(s): François Schuiten

Reprints
- The series has been reprinted, at least in part, in Dutch, English, German, Portuguese, Spanish, Russian, and Japanese.
- Collected editions
- Les Cités Obscures – Livre 1: ISBN 9782203101685
- Les Cités Obscures – Livre 2: ISBN 9782203153745
- Les Cités Obscures – Livre 3: ISBN 9782203153752
- Les Cités Obscures – Livre 4: ISBN 9782203186422

The Obscure Cities (French: Les Cités Obscures), first published in English as, variously, Stories of the Fantastic and Cities of the Fantastic, is a bande dessinée series created by the Belgian artist François Schuiten and the French writer Benoît Peeters. First serialized in magazine format in 1982, the series has been published in album format by the Brussels-based publisher Casterman since 1983. New installments of the series were published throughout the 1980s, 1990s, 2000s, and 2020s, with full-color, partial color, or black-and-white artwork, as well as photo illustration. The artwork of the series is distinguished by Schuiten's realistic rendering of diverse contemporary, historical, and imaginary architectural styles.

The series is commonly labeled as steampunk, based on frequent appearances of anachronistic technology, storytelling and visual traditions of the scientific romance era, and its retrofuturist parallel world setting of imagined cities and cultures inspired by Jules Verne's literary depiction of Europe in the late 19th century. However, diverging from steampunk conventions as well as science fiction and fantasy in general, the setting is neither a speculative world nor an alternate history, but rather a "plausible" world for readers to "relate to", as Peeters has emphasized. The Obscure Cities has no unifying narrative, instead telling a series of unrelated stories, which have spanned genres such as pseudo-documentary, travel literature, psychological drama, and political satire.

Winning the Angoulême International Comics Festival Prize for Best Album in 1985 established The Obscure Cities as a prominent work of Franco-Belgian comics. The series has been analysed by literary and artistic scholars, and both authors are active in art, literature, and film projects in Belgium and France.

== Background ==
Born in Brussels to a family of architects, Schuiten had many relatives, especially his father and brothers, who were instrumental in what he has termed Bruxellisation, the demolition of historic architecture (typified by Belgian Art Nouveau architect Victor Horta, who worked in Brussels at the turn of the 20th century) in favor of anonymous, low-quality modernist office and business buildings. Bruxellisation would become an important part in Schuiten's and Peeters' 1950s childhood memories of the city, and Schuiten's artstyle would become influenced by Horta's Art Nouveau designs.

Schuiten was brought up to study architecture by his father, both in university and early on at home. Meanwhile, his older brother, Luc, introduced the young François to Franco-Belgian bandes dessinées, with René Goscinny, Morris, and André Franquin among his early favorites. Though Schuiten recalls his father's distaste for comics illustration, he was influenced by his father's evocative architectural drawing style, adding skies and figures rendered to suggest atmosphere and stories (as a sales tactic while visiting prospective clients).

In 1968, Schuiten and Peeters became friends while attending Catholic school, and the two worked together to write and illustrate a student publication. Ten years later, they reunited in Brussels and resumed their creative collaborations. Peeters, who was an aspiring novelist at this time, set aside those efforts for the comparative financial safety of the comics industry.

Around 1980, as an established graphic novel artist published in Pilote and Métal Hurlant and a number of standalone albums, Schuiten began drafting a parallel world of vintage architectural splendor reflecting his childhood memories of Brussels, a world which can be reached primarily through remaining buildings of these bygone times. In the fiction of Schuiten's setting, Bruxellisation is postulated as an ongoing effort to suppress knowledge of this parallel world.

In 1982 the first Les Cités obscures album, Les murailles de Samaris, began publication as a serial in the Franco-Belgian comics magazine À Suivre. Owned by Casterman, the monthly periodical marketed comics as literary works, serialized in complete chapters (rather than comic strips excerpted from forthcoming albums, as established by Casterman's earlier magazines). As a result, Schuiten and Peeters produced ten to twenty pages of story at a time for publication, before later parts of the story were finalized.

== Styles and themes ==
Schuiten's artstyle utilizes realistic line art, emphasizing outlines and flat colours according to the Belgian ligne claire tradition, but also incorporating tonal techniques akin to engraving, with heavy use of hatching and cross-hatching. His detailed, multi-step processes incorporate sketches, storyboards, and extensive visual research, which suited À Suivre's serialization schedule. In 2019, Peeters acknowledged that such time-consuming art production no longer fit current comics publishing; subsequently, the next entry in the series was an illustrated book rather than a comic.

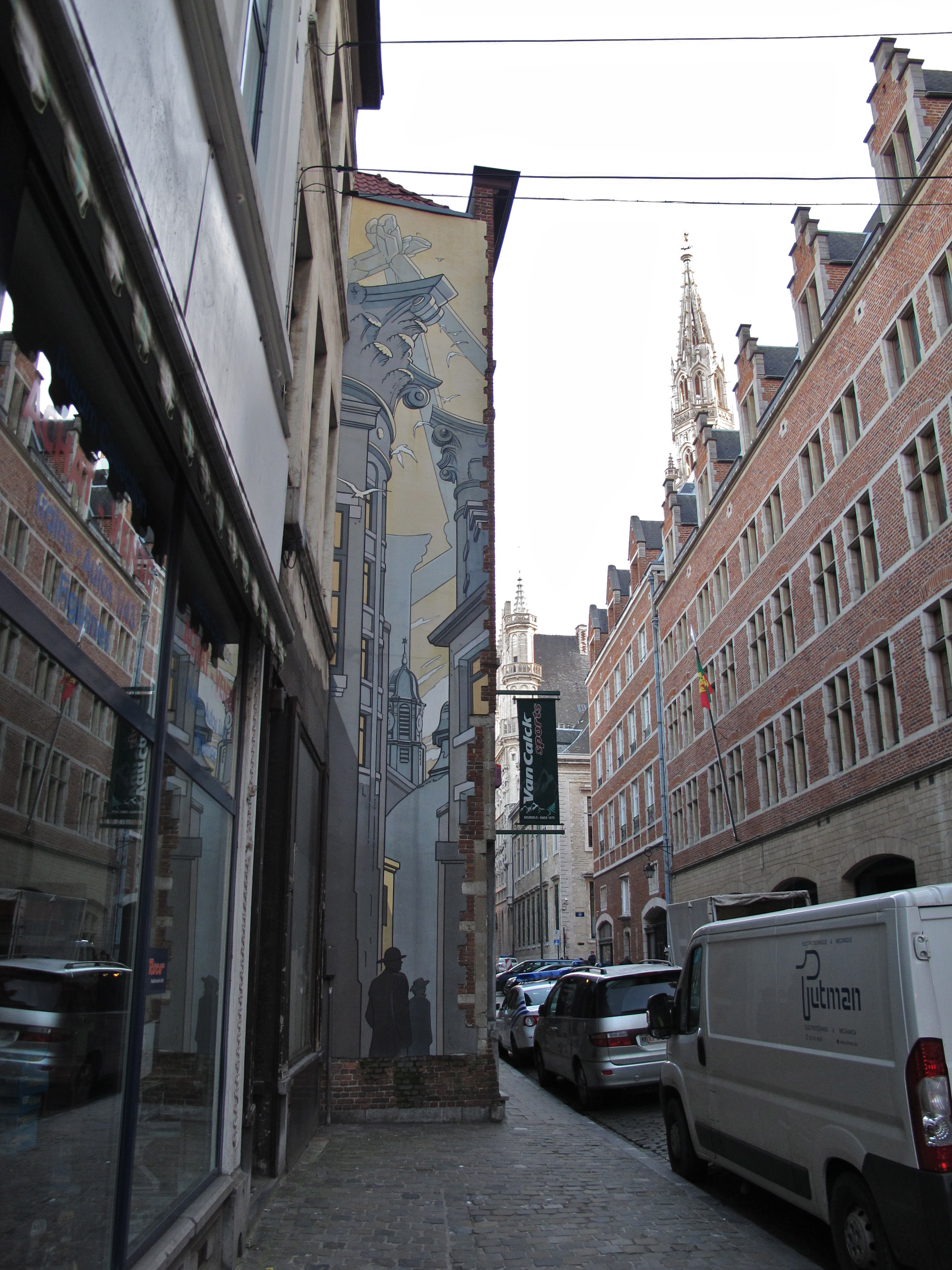
Comic wall in Brussels, Belgium

Peeters has defined the Obscure Cities world according to philosophical concepts: it is a spatiotemporally paradoxical world (where objects may contain themselves), where natural orders conflict with each other, which resists coherence and is defined by its internal differences. Influential ideas cited by Peeters include Deleuze and Guattari's concept of the rhizome, Jacques Lacan's theories based on Borromean rings, and Sigmund Freud's description of the uncanny.

A recurring theme of Obscure Cities stories is resistance against absolutist rules, which are often imposed by political powers. The protagonists, who are sometimes "doubtful" and "weak", are driven to search for another world or for a different way of life, though they are not always successful in their journeys. None of the stories are resolved by confrontations against villains; antagonists and characters who commit wrongdoings are not ultimately central to the plots.

Various commentators, as well as Schuiten himself, have identified visual and theme influences in Les Cités obscures from as diverse works as those by Verne, Winsor McCay, Franz Kafka, René Magritte, Giovanni Battista Piranesi, Victor Horta, Henry Fuseli, and Jean-Léon Gérôme.

== Books ==
In Belgium and France, Casterman publishes all albums in the series. From 2017 to 2019, Casterman also collected all existing albums in four complete volumes. Most, but not all, albums have been published in English, some multiple times: first in serialized form in Heavy Metal and Dark Horse Comics' Cheval Noir, then as complete albums by NBM Publishing and IDW Publishing. The French Casterman standard editions and published English translations follow.

=== Albums ===
English title(s)	French title	Printing	Album published	French edition(s) ISBN	English edition(s) ISBN
The Great Walls of Samaris (NBM); Samaris (Includes The Mysteries of Pâhry) (IDW)	Les murailles de Samaris	Colour	1983	2203335130; 978-2203006911 (expanded, 2007)	0-918348-36-6 (NBM); 978-1631409424 (IDW)
Dispatched to investigate the distant city of Samaris, Franz Bauer is gradually driven to paranoia and fugue by the city's strange nature.
Fever in Urbicand (NBM); The Fever in Urbicande (IDW)	La fièvre d'Urbicande	Black and white Colour (2020)	1985	2203334231; 978-2203026346 (expanded, 2009); 978-2203202924 (colour, 2020)	0-918348-86-2 (NBM); 978-1684058037 (colour, IDW)
The architect Eugen Robick witnesses the socially stratified city of Urbicande transformed by a cubic lattice that inexorably spreads through the city.
The Tower	La Tour	Black and white; select pages in full or partial colour	1987	2203334339; 978-2203017436 (expanded, 2008)	1-56163-070-5 (NBM); 978-1684057313 (IDW)
Giovanni Battista, a maintainer of a megastructure known only as the Tower, leaves his post for the first time and encounters its regions and people, and learns of the secret hidden at its top.
–	La route d'Armilia	Colour	1988	2203343036; 978-2203020931 (expanded, 2010)	–
A boy named Ferdinand travels by airship from Mylos to Armilia, showcasing aerial artwork of many of the Cities.
Brüsel	Brüsel	Colour	1992	2203343095; 978-2203012899 (expanded, 2008)	1-56163-291-0 (NBM)
Flower shop owner Constant Abeels is caught in the comedies of errors that ensue as bureaucratic forces push to demolish and redevelop the city of Brüsel.
The Leaning Girl	L'enfant penchée	Black and white (artwork); Greyscale (photo illustrations); Colour (2010 introduction)	1996	2203343117; 978-2203029668 (expanded, 2010)	978-1628472288 (Alaxis Press); 978-1628472271 (IDW)
An unprecedented celestial event causes the young heiress Mary von Rathen to stand at a permanent lean, leading to a series of misadventures far from home. Outside Paris, at the turn of the 20th century, the painter Augustin Desombres is compelled to paint images he has never seen, unaware that Mary is his inspiration.
The Shadow of a Man	L'ombre d'un homme	Colour	1999	2203343125; 978-2203020948 (expanded, 2009)	978-1684056934 (IDW)
Insurance adjuster Albert Chamisso, unable to cope with first recurring nightmares and then his own shadow becoming coloured, is driven to ruin but fortuitously receives a second chance.
The Invisible Frontier	La frontière invisible	Colour	2002 (vol. 1); 2004 (vol. 2)	978-2203343177 (vol. 1); 978-2203343184 (vol. 2); 978-2203049079 (complete)	1-56163-333-X (vol. 1, NBM); 1-56163-400-X (vol. 2, NBM); 978-1684058785 (complete, IDW)
When the Sodrovno army orders the national Center for Cartography to produce cartographic propaganda to support an expansionist war, Roland de Cremer, a cartography student, benefits from sweeping reorganizations, but fears that geographic truths will be lost.
The Theory of the Grain of Sand	La Théorie du grain de sable	Black and grey, with white highlights	2007 (vol. 1); 2008 (vol. 2)	978-2203343238 (vol. 1); 978-2203343269 (vol. 2); 978-2203063044 (complete and expanded, 2013)	978-1631404894 (complete, IDW)
An ill-fated visitor to the rebuilt Brüsel barters a mysterious contraption, creating escalating misfortunes for several bystanders that soon turn catastrophic for the entire city. Constant Abeels and Mary von Rathen return as protagonists, working together with others to understand these disasters and save the city.
–	Souvenirs de l'Eternel présent (new edition)	Colour	2009	978-2203024854	–
In the ruins of Taxandria, where knowledge of the past is forbidden, a boy discovers the events that led to the city's downfall. This is a new version of the 1993 book, entirely redrawn in comic format, now published by Casterman under the Cités obscures branding.
The Return of Captain Nemo	Le retour du capitaine Nemo	Black and white	2023	978-2203254398	TBA
–

=== Other Casterman publications ===
These works were also published by Casterman under the Cités obscures branding. They do not have conventional narratives and do not use the comic book format. All are collected in Casterman's complete Cités obscures volumes.

Title	Printing	Published	ISBN
L'archiviste	Colour (recto); Black and white (verso)	1986	2203349018; 2203349204 (expanded, 2000)
Researcher Isidore Louis is assigned to review voluminous archival documents to debunk a growing fervent belief in another world called "the Obscure Cities". He finds a series of cryptic images, with little context or explanation.
L'Encyclopédie des transports présents et à venir	Greyscale	1988	2203903023
This is an illustrated fictional encyclopedia describing imaginary and anachronistic transportation technology.
Le Musée A. Desombres	Colour	1990	2203985992
This is a bundle of a booklet and an audio drama on CD; both describe a fictional real-world exhibit of the paintings of Augustin Desombres, which becomes a portal into the Obscure Cities world. A transcript of the audio drama is compiled in the complete Cités obscures volumes.
L'Écho des cités	Colour	1993	2203349034
This is a collection of fictional in-universe newspapers.
Mary la penchée	Colour	1995	2203553448
This is a picture book telling the story that would be published as The Leaning Girl.
Le Guide des cités	Colour	1996	2203380268; 2203380268 (expanded, 2002); 978-2203043268 (further expanded, 2011)
This is a fictional tourist guide.
L'affaire Desombres	Colour	2002	2203380403
This is a bundle of a booklet and a 90-minute documentary film on DVD, expanding the story of Augustin Desombres. A transcript of the film, with accompanying screen captures, is compiled in the complete Cités obscures volumes.

Encyclopédie des transports présents et à venir by Axel Wappendorf, a spin-off

=== Related works ===
These works were not published by Casterman.

1. Le Mystère d'Urbicande (1985)
2. Le passage (1989)
3. Souvenirs de l'Eternel présent (1993), an adaptation of the film Taxandria (see below)

Le Mystère d'Urbicande was written by Belgian author and Obscure fan Thierry Smolderen (under the pseudonym Professeur R. de Brok), purports to be a scientific essay bent to debunk the events of La fièvre d'Urbicande. The text is heavily annotated in emotional handwriting by Eugen Robick, the main character of La fièvre d'Urbicande who is now locked up in Brüsel's Sixth Hospice, the city's mental asylum. Schuiten contributed the book's illustrations under the pen-name Robert Louis Marie de la Barque (whereas the French word barque, meaning barge or rowboat in English, translates to schuiten in Dutch).

The volume Voyages en Utopie (2000) presents the ongoing and completed work carried on by these two authors, in parallel with the Cités obscures series. Another book Schuiten and Peeters collaborated on in reference to Les Cités obscures is Les Portes du Possible (2005).

== Worldbuilding ==
The world (or "continent", according to the authors) of the Cités obscures forms a disparate grouping of cities located on a "counter-Earth", which is invisible from our Earth because it is situated exactly opposite it on the other side of the Sun. A map illustrated on the final page of Les Murailles de Samaris first hinted at the extent of this alternate world, and a full world map shown in the opening pages of La Fièvre d'Urbicande labeled many more city names. Next, L'Archiviste, an oversized poster book, illustrated many of these cities in a series of decontextualized images. Some of the images from L'Archiviste were revisited in later albums or stories, while others remain unexplored. In 1996, Le Guide des Cités was published, presented as a guide book which catalogued the cities of this world as tourist destinations.

Although these books are similar to spinoff media used in transmedia storytelling in media franchises, Les Cités obscures departs from such conventions by keeping its fictional universe "open" and "ad hoc" in nature. There are no central characters or locations, and no overarching narrative; gaps between stories of individual albums leave intervening events to the imagination. Commentary on the series has also emphasized the absence of a bible for the setting.

The openness of the Cités obscures setting has allowed readers to participate in worldbuilding, especially after the authors introduced the notion that travel between the two worlds is possible by means of "gates" (portes) called Obscure Passages. These are mostly to be found in buildings and constructions similar or identical to each other on both planets, whereas the distinct architectural style of a structure makes it a potential candidate to harbor an Obscure Passage to an Obscure City whose distinct style it resembles.

The Internet has contributed to creation of false documents in the Cités obscures setting. On websites such as Web of the Obscure Cities (which is no longer online but is documented on AltaPlana.be, an online encyclopaedia for Obscure Cities) and Office of the Obscure Passages, Schuiten and Peeters present alleged reports, often illustrated with photos and drawings, claiming accidental crossings over into the world of the Obscure Cities via Obscure Passages, or by so-called Obscurantists who have been seeking Obscure Passages for years (compare Obscurantist, a term based upon the Epistolæ Obscurorum Virorum, aka "Letters of Obscure Men"). The real authorship of some of this material remains unclear due to the use of pseudepigrapha.

Some of this worldbuilding material is incorporated into the Cités obscures publications. The authors claim that, after creating the character Mary von Rathen in Le Musée A. Desombres, they received correspondence from an unknown person identifying as the character, first by mail and later e-mail, which invented new details of the Cités obscures setting from a first-person perspective. In Le Guide des Cités, Schuiten and Peeters directly incorporate assertions and quotes from this correspondence, even where the claims contradict published material. Though the source of the letters remains unknown, Schuiten and Peeters deny authorship.

== Multimedia ==
Schuiten and Peeters have incorporated the Obscure Cities into other media.

=== Films ===
Drafting and development of the film Taxandria and its accompanying graphic novel adaptation began between Schuiten and Peeters as early as 1988. Benoît Peeters had collaborated with director Raoul Servais before on a documentary entitled Servaisgraphia on Servais's unique animation style that was released in 1992. Subsequently, Schuiten served as production designer for the Belgian fantasy film Taxandria (1994) directed by Servais (starring, among others, Armin Mueller-Stahl). In the Obscure Cities series, at times characters refer to the vanished city-state of Taxandria which was accidentally removed from the planet during a failed scientific experiment.

A common theme in steampunk-influenced Les Cités obscures, Taxandrian clothing and technology appear to resemble Victorian times on our earth, Taxandria's architecture is reminiscent of Schuiten's trademark phantasmagorical architectural fantasies, and another feature the film shares with Les Cités obscures is a bloated absurd, Kafkaesque bureaucracy.

A graphic novel adaptation of Taxandria was published by Schuiten and Peeters one year prior to the film's official release under the title Souvenirs de l'Eternel Présent: Variation sur le Film Taxandria de Raoul Servais (Arboris, 1993, ISBN 90-344-1011-0, ISBN 978-90-344-1011-5), also including production background information on the film. In 2009, this book was entirely redrawn and published as a Cités obscures title.

A setting of La fièvre d'Urbicande appears in the 2012 Canadian science fiction movie Mars et Avril by Martin Villeneuve, based on the graphic novels of the same name. As a matter of fact, François Schuiten agreed to have a 3D model made out of his futuristic auditorium, for a scene taking place inside the Temple of Cosmologists. The director had this image in mind when writing his books, a few years before Schuiten joined the team as production designer. Before the shooting, even the extras were chosen to look like the characters in the comic book.

=== Urbicande.be ===
In 1996, Urbicande.be, the official website of the Obscure Cities went online, soliciting fan accounts of their own experiences in search for Obscure Passages. The response was so overwhelming that Schuiten and Peeters were able to expand their online activities into a network of in-universe sites, mainly branching from the URL ebbs.net of their official Obscure magazine called Obskür, where many amateur reports, illustrated by photos and Schuiten's drawings, and various mysterious Obscure artifacts can be found. Along with these, a number of conspiracy theories are explored, regarding authorities of our world intending to prevent the spread of knowledge regarding the parallel world and destroy various Obscure Passages. In May 2015, Urbicande.be was taken offline and archived at AltaPlana.be, an official online encyclopaedia of the Obscure Cities universe.

=== La maison Autrique ===
After having colorfully satirized the destructive modernizing fad of Bruxellisation in the Les Cités obscures album Brüsel in 1992, Schuiten and Peeters convinced the community of Schuiten's childhood district Schaerbeek to acquire one of the last remaining buildings in Brussels built by Art Nouveau architect Horta, La maison Autrique, and in 1999 opened a permanent pseudo-documentary exhibition inside, regarding the Obscure Cities, 19th century Art Nouveau Brussels, and detailing its ongoing Bruxellisation destruction during the 20th century, tying in with aforementioned conspiracy theories whereby Bruxellisation is supposed to be an attempt by the authorities to destroy a number of Obscure Passages situated in Brussels.

In 2004, Schuiten and Peeters published the illustrated book La Maison Autrique: Métamorphose d'une maison Art Nouveau (published as Maison Autrique – Metamorphosis of an Art Nouveau House in English) about the building, its restoration during the 1990s, and Horta's life and work. Also, their latest Les Cités obscures two-part graphic novel album La Théorie du grain de sable (2007; 2008) deals with the maison Autrique. As of 2021, the house also hosts a Cités obscures-themed escape room game.

=== Public art ===
The album Le retour du capitaine Nemo, published in October 2023, depicts the "Nauti-pouple", a part-animal imaginary vehicle inspired by Jules Verne's Nautilus. In a multi-year collaboration with French sculptor Pierre Matter, Schuiten co-designed the Nauti-pouple as a 6-metre-tall public sculpture, which will be displayed in Brussels, followed by permanent installation at Amiens station in 2025 to commemorate the city's connections to Verne. The album, likewise, shows the Nauti-pouple journeying through various Cities to arrive at Samarobrive, the Obscure Cities counterpart of Amiens.

== Publishing history ==
The full series is available in French and Dutch from Casterman; in German, Spanish, Polish (Manzoku and Scream Comics) and Portuguese by local publishing houses; in francophone Canada by Flammarion; and in Japanese in four collected volumes by Shogakukan-Shueisha Productions. The first Japanese volume, published in 2012, won the annual manga award at the Japan Media Arts Festival. This success encouraged the compilation of the original French albums by Casterman.

Five books of the series were published in English by NBM Publishing; these went out of print in 2008. Alaxis Press (named after the "sulphuric" Obscure City of Alaxis) issued an English-language edition of The Leaning Girl (L'enfant penchée) in 2014. Leaning Mary, a spin-off picture book, was issued in 2015.

In 2016, Alaxis partnered with IDW Publishing as the new North American publisher of The Obscure Cities, with Alaxis Press co-branding, and the original staff handling translation and editing. IDW and Alaxis published The Theory of the Grain of Sand in 2016, Samaris in 2017, The Shadow of a Man in 2021, and The Tower in 2022. IDW then released The Fever in Urbicande and The Invisible Frontier in 2022, without Alaxis's involvement; the entire Obscure Cities series was delisted from IDW's website prior to release of these books.

In 2023, concurrent to the French release of Le retour du capitaine Nemo, Alaxis Press launched another Kickstarter campaign, funding a simultaneous English release as The Return of Captain Nemo.

The Leaning Girl received a 2015 Eisner Award nomination as Best U.S. Edition of International Material, and The Shadow of a Man won the same award in 2022.

== Awards ==
- 1985: Angoulême International Comics Festival Prize for Best Album – La Fièvre d'Urbicande
- 2012: Gaiman Award for Best Comic
- 2022: Eisner Award for Best U.S. Edition of International Material – The Shadow of a Man
