= Brüsel =

Graphic novel in Les Cités Obscures series

Brüsel, cover

Brüsel is a graphic novel by Belgian comic artists François Schuiten and Benoît Peeters, the fifth volume of their ongoing Les Cités Obscures series. It was first published in serialized form in the Franco-Belgian comics magazine À Suivre (#158-160, 171-173), and as a complete volume first in 1992 by Casterman. In English, it was published as Brüsel (Cities of the Fantastic) in 2001 by NBM Publishing.

== Editions ==
=== In French ===
- Brüsel, 1992, Casterman
- Brüsel, 1993, Casterman
- Brüsel, 1996, Casterman
- Brüsel, 1997, Casterman
- Brüsel, 2008, Casterman

=== In English ===
- Brüsel, 2001, NBM Publishing
