= Alain Dorval =

French actor (1946–2024)

- Born: Alain Fernand Jean-Marie Bergé; 9 August 1946; Algiers, Algeria
- Died: 13 February 2024 (aged 77); Villejuif, France
- Occupations: Actor; Voice actor
- Spouse: Dominique Dumont
- Children: Aurore Bergé

Alain Dorval (born Alain Fernand Jean-Marie Bergé, 9 August 1946 – 13 February 2024) was a French actor, best known as the official dub voice of Sylvester Stallone, Nick Nolte, and the Disney character Pete. His voice was also featured on the radio stations Skyrock and ADO FM.

== Personal life ==
Dorval was educated at the Cours Simon drama school and the Conservatory of Dramatic Art of Paris. His daughter is the Renaissance politician Aurore Bergé; during his daughter's marriage, he was the father-in-law of politician Nicolas Bays.

He died from cancer at the Institut Gustave Roussy in Villejuif on 13 February 2024, at the age of 77.

== Dubbing roles ==
=== Television animation ===
- Goof Troop (Pete)
- Once Upon a Time... Life (Le Gros, Le Teigneux)
- Once Upon a Time... Space (Commander Le Gros, Le Teigneux)
- Superman: The Animated Series (Lex Luthor)
- Quarxs by Maurice Benayoun (1991-1993)

=== Original video animation ===
- Aladdin and the King of Thieves (Sa'luk)
- An Extremely Goofy Movie (Pete)
- Mickey, Donald, Goofy: The Three Musketeers (Captain Pete)

=== Theatrical animation ===
- An American Tail (Tiger)
- An American Tail: Fievel Goes West (Tiger)
- A Goofy Movie (Pete)
- Antz (Weaver)
- Mickey's Christmas Carol (Ghost of Christmas Yet to Come)
- The Secret Life of Pets 2 (Rooster)

=== Video games ===
- Hogs of War : General I.P. Grimly
- Crash Nitro Kart (Tiny Tiger)
- Jak II (Krew, Brutter)
- Jak X: Combat Racing (Krew)

=== Live action ===
- 48 Hrs. (Jack Cates)
- Alien (Brett)
- Baa Baa Black Sheep (Andy Micklin)
- Cape Fear (Sam Bowden)
- Cobra (Marion Cobretti)
- Daylight (Kit Latura)
- First Blood (John Rambo)
- Hulk (David Banner)
- Jesus of Nazareth (John the Baptist)
- Rambo (John Rambo)
- Rocky IV (Rocky Balboa)
- Rocky Balboa (Rocky Balboa)
- Stop! Or My Mom Will Shoot (Sergeant Joseph Andrew 'Joe' Bomowski)
- Transformers (Ratchet)
- Tron (Kevin Flynn, Clu)
