= Benoît Peeters =

French writer (born 1956)

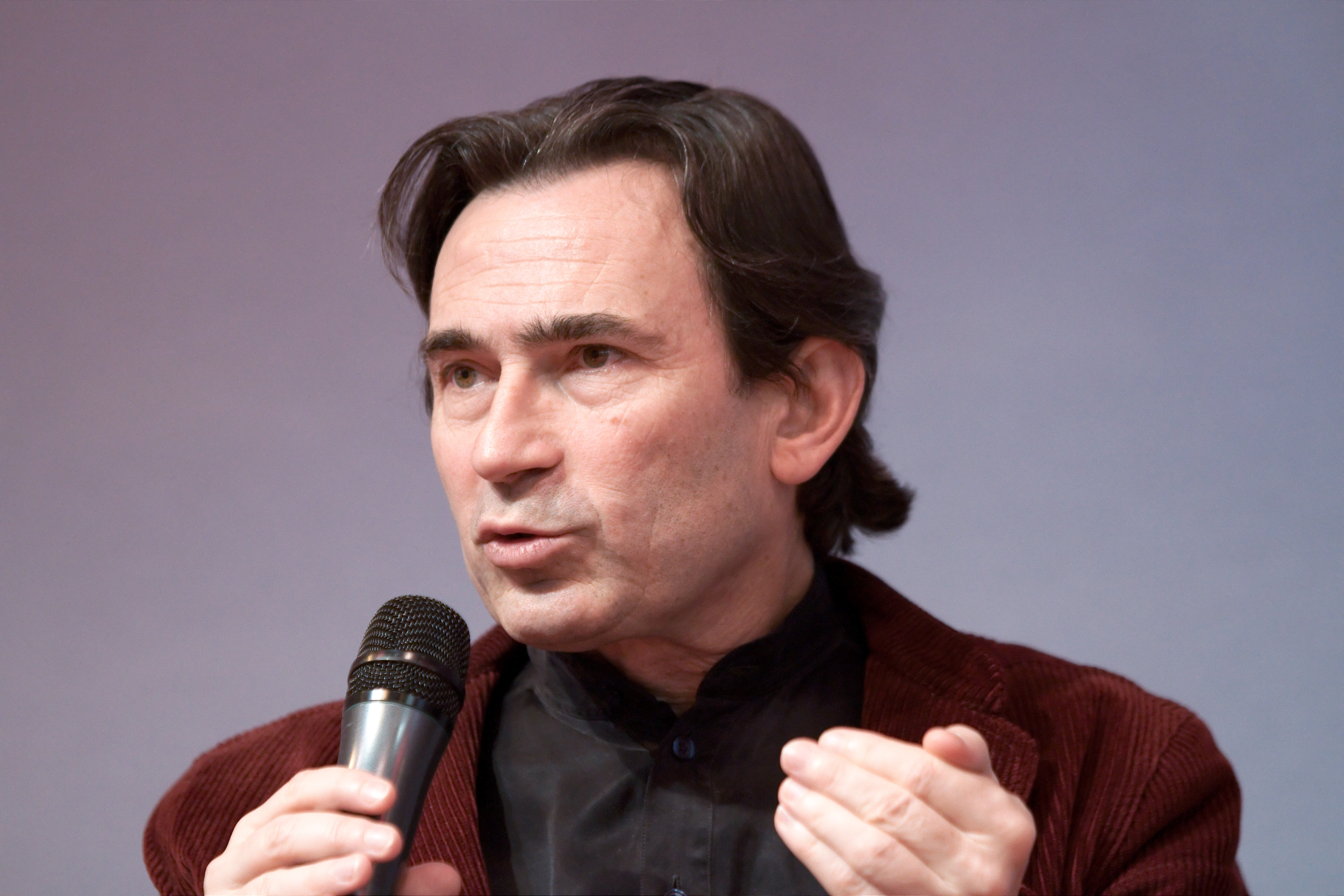
- Benoît Peeters in March 2010
- Born: 28 August 1956 (age 70) Paris, France
- Area: Writer
- Notable works: Les Cités obscures
- Awards: Ptolémée Award (1995); Inkpot Award (2014); Officier des Arts et des Lettres (2014)
- www.benoitpeeters.net

Benoît Peeters (French: [petɛʁs]; born 28 August 1956) is a French writer, essayist, professor, screenwriter, comics writer, and critic. He is also an expert on the world of Tintin.

In 2022–2023, Benoît Peeters held the Chair of Artistic Creation at the Collège de France, which hosts, for one academic year, a prominent figure representing contemporary artistic creation in all its forms. He gave a series of lectures on the Poétique de la bande dessinée (Poetics of Comics).

== Biography ==
=== Early life and career ===
Born in Paris, Benoît Peeters spent his childhood in Brussels, where his father was one of the first European civil servants. At age 12, while attending Don Bosco High School, he met the future comic book artist François Schuiten, with whom he conceived a newspaper, Go. He did not return to France until 1973. After preparatory classes at the Lycée Louis-le-Grand and a degree in philosophy from the Panthéon-Sorbonne University, he studied at the École des hautes études en sciences sociales where he was mentored by Roland Barthes. His 1980 semiotics master's thesis focused on "the panel-by-panel analysis of The Castafiore Emerald".

His first novel, Omnibus, a fictional biography of Claude Simon, was published in 1976. In 1980, he published a second novel, La Bibliothèque de Villers, a tribute to Jorge Luis Borges at least as much as to Agatha Christie.

In 1977, he discovered gastronomy during a meal at the Troisgros brothers' restaurant in Roanne. While still a student and having returned to live in Brussels, he worked for a year as a private chef. He recounted this experience much later in the graphic novel Comme un chef, illustrated by Aurélia Aurita.

Since the beginning of his career, Benoît Peeters has not stopped diversifying his activities: novelist, biographer, screenwriter, comics critic and theorist, set designer and publisher. In 2009, he published Écrire l'image, an autobiographical essay. He originally wrote this research synthesis as part of his habilitation thesis (defended at the Panthéon-Sorbonne in 2007).

=== Hergé specialist ===
Benoît Peeters first met Hergé in 1977 in Brussels, during an interview he conducted with Patrice Hamel for the magazine Minuit. In addition to his thesis on The Castafiore Emerald (the original text was formatted into book format in 1984), he published several short studies on Tintin. When Carlsen and Casterman considered producing a monograph on Hergé, it was Tintin's creator himself who suggested that the publishers entrust the writing of the book to Peeters. For this book (Le Monde d’Hergé), he interviewed the cartoonist at length, three months before the latter's death.

Subsequently, Benoît Peeters worked on various projects related to Hergé, sometimes in collaboration with the art critic Pierre Sterckx: the collection L'Œuvre intégrale d'Hergé for Rombaldi publishers (1984-1989), the album edition of Tintin's last, unfinished adventure, Tintin and Alph-Art (1986), the documentary film Monsieur Hergé (1988), the exhibitions Hergé dessinateur (1988-1989) and Au Tibet avec Tintin (1994), and the Tintin reporter themed evening for the Franco-German channel Arte (1995).

In 2002, he published the biography Hergé, fils de Tintin (Hergé, Son of Tintin), the result of his research and interviews with direct witnesses. The book is considered the definitive work on the topic.

From 2015 to 2018, he was one of the three authors of the postfaces for the collection Hergé, Le feuilleton intégral, published jointly by Moulinsart and Casterman and still unfinished to date.

=== Comic book writer ===
Critics note his taste for experimentation and his ability to renew his art from one album to the next. This is precisely what accounts for the success of the series Les Cités obscures (The Obscure Cities), which he created in 1982 with his friend, the illustrator François Schuiten. The series does not adhere to any of the classic rules of a genre or format: the heroes are not necessarily the same from one story to another; each story takes place in a different city, at a different time; some volumes are in black and white, others in color, sometimes both, etc.

Beyond comics, the world of The Obscure Cities extends to other media and narrative forms. For example, Mary la penchée is presented as an illustrated children's book, while Le Guide des Cités resembles a true tourist guide. In total, sixteen albums have been published by Casterman. The series has been translated into about ten languages and its authors have received several awards, notably the Grand Prize in the Manga category, which was given to them in February 2013 at the Japan Media Arts Festival. This was the first time such an award had honored both a French and a Belgian author.

Still working with François Schuiten, Benoît Peeters extended the imaginary world of the Obscure Cities through several exhibitions, a musical performance (L’Affaire Desombres, 1999-2000), a mockumentary (Le Dossier B, 1995), and the scenography of a building designed by Victor Horta in Brussels, the Autrique House.

Benoît Peeters also worked with other illustrators, notably Aurélia Aurita, Frédéric Boilet, Anne Baltus, and Alain Goffin. One of his graphic novels, Dolorès (script in collaboration with François Schuiten, drawings by Anne Baltus), was adapted for the screen by the German filmmaker Michael Rösel.

In another genre, he published with his former partner, the photographer Marie-Françoise Plissart, a series of photographic narratives of a new kind, published notably by the Éditions de Minuit.

=== Essayist and biographer ===
Benoît Peeters is interested in all the arts (visual and literary in particular) without any hierarchy of genres, something that was still frowned upon in society during his adolescence. A theorist and critic, he is the author of several essays on comics. In addition to Hergé's work, he has studied the works of Rodolphe Töpffer, Winsor McCay, Jirō Taniguchi, and Chris Ware.

He has also published works on Paul Valéry, Alfred Hitchcock, Agatha Christie, Nadar, Victor Horta, as well as on screenwriting, storyboarding, and collaborative writing (Nous est un autre, with Michel Lafon).

In 2010, Benoît Peeters published the first biography of the philosopher Jacques Derrida, accompanying it with a journal and reflections on the biographical genre, Trois ans avec Derrida, Les carnets d’un biographe. Acclaimed by critics, this biography has been translated into English, German, Spanish, Portuguese, Chinese, and Japanese, among other languages. He has also published biographies of Paul Valéry, Sándor Ferenczi, and Alain Robbe-Grillet.

His interest in biographies dates back to his adolescence, a period during which he was an avid reader of books about the lives of painters such as Gauguin, Van Gogh, and Cézanne.

=== Other activities ===
Benoît Peeters has made several forays into audiovisual media. He has directed documentaries on comics (including some episodes of the series Comix in 2004 for Arte), the film Jacques Derrida, Le courage de la pensée (in collaboration with Virginie Linhart), and filmed interviews with Alain Robbe-Grillet.

In cinema, he collaborated in 1987 with filmmaker Raoul Ruiz on the screenplay for the film La Chouette aveugle. He has also directed several short films, as well as a feature film, Le Dernier Plan, in 1999, which notably features Pierre Arditi, Érik Orsenna, and Bernard Pivot.

Director of the "Bibliothèque de Moulinsart" collection (dedicated to Hergé) for Casterman from 1988 to 1996, he has been an editorial advisor at the same publisher since 2001. He also runs an independent publishing house, Les Impressions nouvelles, which he co-founded in 1985.

Concerned about the professional and economic situation of authors, he launched the États généraux de la Bande dessinée (General Assembly of Comics) in 2015, with Valérie Mangin and Denis Bajram.

Associate Professor at the Conservatoire national des arts et métiers from 2016 to 2019, Benoît Peeters shared his passion for cooking in 2018 through a series of lectures at this school. After serving as a Visiting Professor at Lancaster University (England), he was elected to the Chair of Artistic Creation at the Collège de France for the 2022-2023 academic year; there he taught the Poétique de la bande dessinée ("Poetics of Comics").

== Bibliography ==
This bibliography lists books in French and English. Some books have also been translated into other languages.

=== Literature ===
- (fr) Omnibus, Minuit, 1976 (out of print). Expanded edition, Les Impressions nouvelles, 2001.
- (fr) La Bibliothèque de Villers, Robert Laffont, 1980 (out of print). Reissue, Labor, coll. "Espace Nord", 2012.
- (fr) Le Transpatagonien, in collaboration with Raoul Ruiz, Les Impressions nouvelles, 2002.
- (fr) Villes enfuies, stories and fragments, Les Impressions nouvelles, 2007.

=== Comic book scripts and illustrated stories ===
- (fr) Les Cités obscures ('The Obscure Cities'), in collaboration with François Schuiten, Casterman. Most, but not all, albums have been published in English by NBM Publishing and IDW Publishing.
  - Les Murailles de Samaris, 1983.
  - La Fièvre d’Urbicande, 1985.
  - L’Archiviste, 1987.
  - La Tour, 1987.
  - La Route d’Armilia, 1988.
  - Le Musée A. Desombres (CD and illustrated album), 1990.
  - Brüsel, 1992.
  - Souvenirs de l’éternel présent, 1993.
  - L’Écho des Cités, 1993.
  - Mary la penchée, 1995.
  - L’Enfant penchée, 1996.
  - Le Guide des Cités, 1996.
  - Le Dossier B, mockumentary, 1996 (DVD : Les Impressions nouvelles, 2007).
  - L’Ombre d’un homme, 1999.
  - Voyages en Utopie, 2000 (out of print).
  - L’Affaire Desombres (music by Bruno Letort, booklet and DVD), 2002.
  - La Frontière invisible, two volumes, 2002 and 2004. Reissue in one volume, 2006.
  - Les Portes du possible, 2005.
  - La Théorie du grain de sable, two volumes, 2007 and 2008. Reissue in one volume, 2009.
  - Le Retour du Capitaine Nemo, 2023.
- (fr) Plagiat !, co-script with François Schuiten, drawings by Alain Goffin, Les Humanoïdes associés, coll. "Pied jaloux", 1989. New edition, Anspach, 2023.
- (fr) Le Signe de Lucifer, drawings by Alain Goffin, Nathan, 1990.
- (fr) Dolorès, co-script with François Schuiten, drawings by Anne Baltus, Casterman, coll. "Studio (À suivre)", 1991.
- (fr) Le Théorème de Morcom, drawings by Alain Goffin, Les Humanoïdes associés, 1992.
- (fr) Calypso, drawings by Anne Baltus, Casterman, coll. "Studio (À suivre)", 1995.
- (fr) Love Hotel, in collaboration with Frédéric Boilet, Casterman, 1993. Reissue, Ego comme X, 2005.
- (fr) Tokyo est mon jardin, in collaboration with Frédéric Boilet, Casterman, 1997. Revised edition, 2002. Reissue, Ego comme X, 2011. Expanded edition including Love Hotel, Casterman, 2018.
  - (en) Tokyo Is My Garden, Fanfare / Ponent Mon, 2007.
- (fr) Demi-tour, in collaboration with Frédéric Boilet, Dupuis, coll. "Aire libre", 1997. Revised and expanded edition, 2010.
- (fr) Revoir Paris, in collaboration with François Schuiten, Casterman :
  - Utopiomane, 2014.
  - La Nuit des constellations, 2016.
  - Reissue in one volume, 2023.
- (fr) Comme un chef, drawings by Aurélia Aurita, Casterman, 2018.

=== Essays ===
- (fr) Le Monde d’Hergé, Casterman, 1983. Revised editions, 1991 and 2004.
  - (en) Tintin and the World of Hergé, Methuen Children’s Books, 1989.
  - (en) Tintin and the World of Hergé. An Illustrated History, Bulfinch Press / Little, Brown and Company, 1992.
- (fr) Les Bijoux ravis. Une lecture moderne de Tintin, Magic Strip, 1984. Reissue under the title Lire Tintin. Les Bijoux ravis, Les Impressions nouvelles, 2007.
- (fr) Case, planche, récit. Comment lire une bande dessinée, Casterman, 1991. Revised edition, 1998. Pocket edition under the title Lire la bande dessinée, Flammarion, coll. "Champs", 2003.
- (fr) Hitchcock. Le travail du film, Les Impressions nouvelles, 1993.
- (fr) La Bande dessinée, Flammarion, coll. "Dominos", 1993.
- (fr) Töpffer. L’invention de la bande dessinée, in collaboration with Thierry Groensteen, Hermann, 1994.
- (fr) Tu parles !? Le français dans tous ses états (coedited with Bernard Cerquiglini, Jean-Claude Corbeil and Jean-Marie Klinkenberg), Flammarion, 2000. Pocket edition, coll. "Champs", 2002.
- (fr) Hergé, fils de Tintin, Flammarion, 2002. Revised edition, 2016. Pocket edition, coll. "Champs", 2006.
  - (en) Hergé, Son of Tintin, The Johns Hopkins University Press, 2012.
- (fr) Nous est un autre. Enquête sur les duos d’écrivains‚ in collaboration with Michel Lafon, Flammarion, 2006.
- (fr) Écrire l’image. Un itinéraire, Les Impressions nouvelles, 2009.
- (fr) Chris Ware. La bande dessinée réinventée, in collaboration with Jacques Samson, Les Impressions nouvelles, 2010.
- (fr) Derrida, Flammarion, 2010.
  - (en) Derrida. A Biography, Polity Press, 2012.
- (fr) Trois ans avec Derrida. Les carnets d’un biographe, Flammarion, 2010.
- (fr) Jirō Taniguchi, l’homme qui dessine, Casterman, 2012.
- (fr) Valéry. Tenter de vivre, Flammarion, 2014.
- (fr) Revoir Paris. L’exposition, in collaboration with François Schuiten, Casterman / Cité de l'Architecture et du Patrimoine, 2014.
- (fr) Raoul Ruiz le magicien, in collaboration with Guy Scarpetta, Les Impressions nouvelles, 2015.
- (fr) Machines à dessiner, in collaboration with François Schuiten, Casterman / Musée des Arts et Métiers, 2016.
- (fr) La Bande dessinée entre la presse et le livre, Bibliothèque nationale de France, 2019.
- (fr) Sandor Ferenczi. L’enfant terrible de la psychanalyse, Flammarion, 2020.
- (fr) Michel Guérard. Mémoire de la cuisine française, Albin Michel, 2020.
- (fr) 3 minutes pour comprendre 50 moments-clés de l’histoire de la bande dessinée, Le Courrier du livre, 2022.
- (fr) Robbe-Grillet. L’aventure du Nouveau Roman, Flammarion, 2022.
- (fr) Réinventer le roman, interviews with Alain Robbe-Grillet, Flammarion, 2022.
- (fr) Dictionnaire amoureux de la bande dessinée, Plon, 2026.

=== Photographic stories ===
- (fr) Fugues, in collaboration with Marie-Françoise Plissart, Minuit, 1983.
- (fr) Droit de regards, in collaboration with Marie-Françoise Plissart (followed by a lecture of Jacques Derrida), Minuit, 1985. Reissue, Les Impressions nouvelles, 2010.
  - (en) Right of Inspection, The Monacelli Press, 1998.
- (fr) Prague, in collaboration with Marie-Françoise Plissart, Autrement, 1985.
- (fr) Le Mauvais Œil, in collaboration with Marie-Françoise Plissart, Minuit, 1986.

== Filmography ==
- Le Compte rendu, screenplay and direction of a 35mm black and white short film. A film starring Eric Slèìchìm and Catherine Belkhodja, presented in the official selection at the Berlin International Film Festival, 1987.
- Servaisgraphia, screenplay and direction in collaboration with Pierre Drouot of a 15-minute 35mm color short film, 1992. Film presented at the Belgian pavilion of the Universal Exhibition of Seville 1992.
- Le Dossier B, mockumentary made in collaboration with François Schuiten and Wilbur Leguebe, 1995. Released on DVD by Les Impressions nouvelles in 2007.
- Le Dernier Plan, screenplay (in collaboration with François Schuiten, Pierre Drouot and Sandrine Willems) and direction of a 35mm color feature film. Production Les Piérides, 1999. Film presented at, among others, the Locarno, Haifa, Cottbus, Saint-Jean-de-Luz and Cairo film festivals.
- Entretiens avec Alain Robbe-Grillet, long version (6 hours 15 minutes), 2 DVDs, Les Impressions nouvelles / IMEC, 2001.
- L’Affaire Desombres, mockumentary written with François Schuiten and accompanied by music by Bruno Letort, Casterman, 2002.
- Jacques Derrida. Le courage de la pensée, documentary written in collaboration with Virginie Linhart, 53 min, Arte France / Morgane Production, 2014.

=== As an actor ===
- La Part de l’ombre, a short film by Olivier Smolders, 2014.

== Awards and distinctions ==
=== Awards ===
- 1984: Bédésup Readers' Prize ("best graphic research" category) for Les Murailles de Samaris (with François Schuiten).
- 1985: Alfred Award for best album at the Angoulême Festival for La Fièvre d’Urbicande (with François Schuiten).
- 1998: Special Prize of the Jury of the Max and Moritz Awards for Le Guide des Cités (with François Schuiten).
- 2012: Grand Prize (Manga category) at the Japan Media Arts Festival for Les Cités obscures (with François Schuiten), awarded in February 2013.
- 2022: Eisner Award (Best U.S. Edition of International Material) for The Shadow of a Man (with François Schuiten).

=== Distinctions ===
- Officier de l’ordre des Arts et des Lettres. He was promoted to the rank of officer on July 9, 2014.
