= Quarxs =

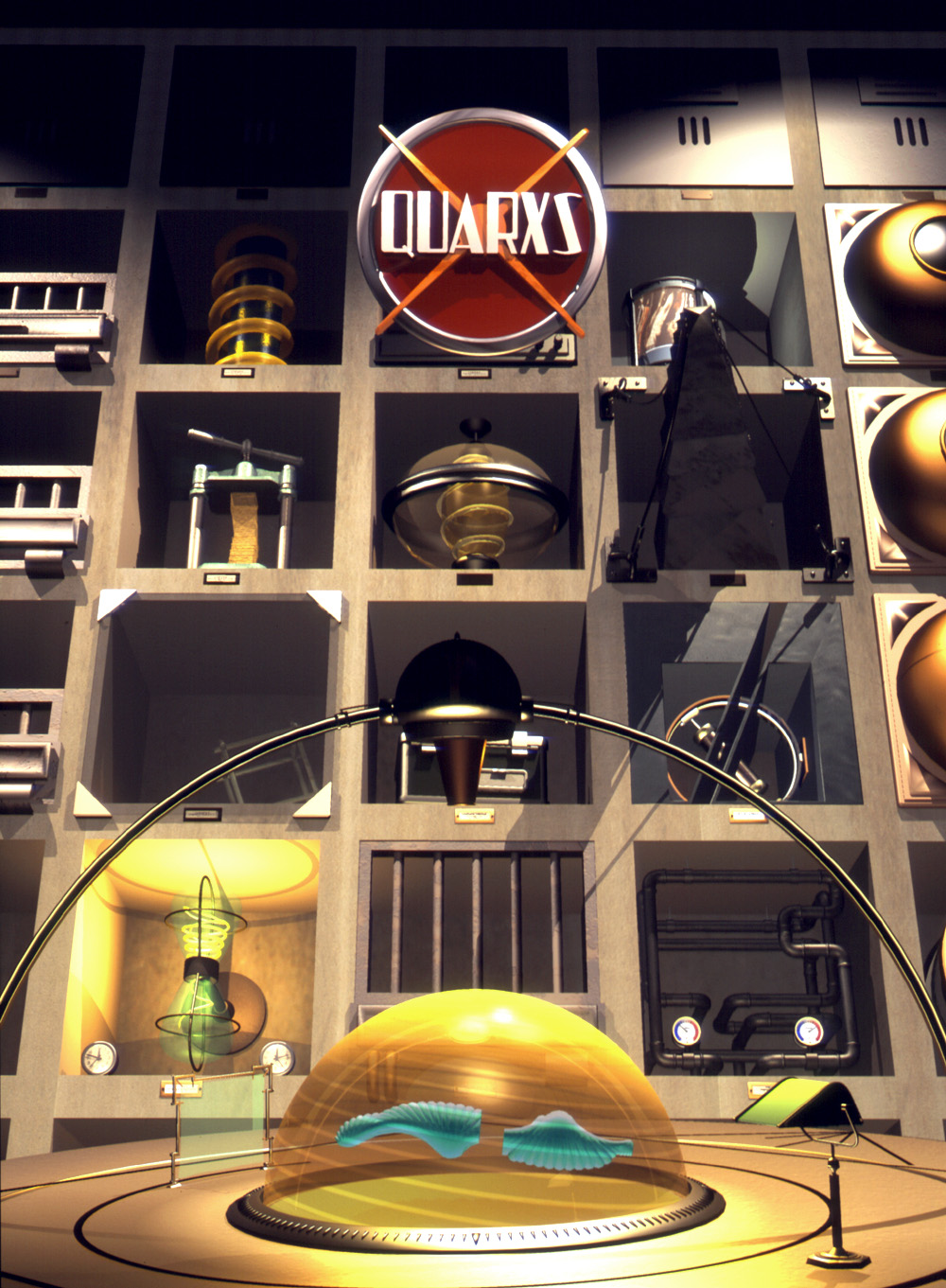
- The Quarxs, Series of 3D animation (1991), Maurice Benayoun, 12 3-minute episodes
- Directed by: Maurice Benayoun
- Voices of: Alain Dorval
- Country of origin: France
- Original language: French

Production
- Running time: 3 minutes
- Production company: Canal+

Original release
- Release: 1990 – 1993

Quarxs was one of the earliest computer-animated series, predating ReBoot, and the first one produced in HD. It was aired between 1990 and 1993.

Each episode was made in HDTV and lasted no more than three minutes. Only twelve episodes of the original series of 100 have been created. The title was meant to describe a common name on mysterious, omnipresent and invisible creatures that were bending the laws of physics, biology, and optics, discovered by a cryptobiology researcher. The Quarxs are presented as being the only and last explanation of the imperfection of the world.

Quarxs is the only fiction animated series by Maurice Benayoun, contemporary artist who dedicates his later work to media art. The series was conceived together with François Schuiten well known Belgian comic book designer. Quarxs has been widely awarded in international events and festivals such as SIGGRAPH, Imagina, Ars Electronica, ISEA, Images du Futur, Sitges, Tampere, and the International Monitor Award. The series has been broadcast in more than 15 countries around the world.

Maurice Benayoun and Belgian comic-book artist Francois Schuiten co-created the animated TV series Quarxs with in 1990. At the time, CG animation was considered new media.

== Creatures ==
- Amperophile; Attracted to electrical currents
- Carno-lampire; A quarx mentioned, but still not described
- Elasto fragmentoplast; Breaks small objects
- Electricia; Causes electrical incidents
- Mille-folio; Lays between the animate and the inanimate
- Mnemochrome; Copies artworks
- Paleoquarxs; Considered a range of primitive Quarxs
- Partio scopa dextra; Visible only from the right side
- Polymorpho Proximens; Takes the shape of nearby objects
- Reverso chronocycli; Reverses the flow of time
- Spatio Striata Exists; Only present in some slices of space
- Spiro Thermophage; Absorbs the heat in plumbing systems

== Awards ==
Quarxs received numerous awards, shown below.

- Finalist, International Monitor Awards, Los Angeles, USA, October 1995.
- Official selection, Film West, Sydney, Australia, August 1995.
- Prize of the Best European Animation Film, Prix Jose Abel, Cinanima, Espinho, Portugal, October 1994.
- Silver Trophy, "Espace Creation", F.A.U.S.T., Toulouse, France, November 1994.
- Official selection, Antenna Cinema, Festival of TV series, Treviso, Italy, September 1994.
- Official selection, Electronic Theater, 5 Th. International Symposium on Electronic Art, ISEA, Helsinki, Finland, August 1994.
- Official Selection, XXVII e INTERNATIONAL Festival of Fantastic Film, Sitges, Spain, July 1994.
- Official Selections, SIGGRAPH, Electronic Theater, Orlando, United States, May 1994.
- SIGGRAPH, Screenings, Orlando, USA, May 1994.
- Special Effects Screenings, Cannes Festival, May 1994.
- Opening movie, " Concours Nouvelles Technologies France Télévision/Art3000 ", Paris, May 1994.
- Distinction (2nd Prize, after Jurassic Park) Ars Electronica, Linz, Austria, June 1994.
- Official Selection, Animation Film Festival, Cardiff, Scotland, April 1994.
- Official Selection, Short Film Festival, Tampere, Finland, Mars 1994.
- 3rd Prize Fiction category, IMAGINA 94, Monte-Carlo, Monaco, February 1994.
- Official Selection, International Animation Film Festival, Brussels, Belgium, February 1994.
- 3rd Prize, Fiction category, IMAGINA ‘93, Monte-Carlo, Monaco, February 1993.
- Official Selection, SIGGRAPH, Chicago, USA, July 1992.
- Official Selection, 5th Festival of Computer Animation, Geneva, Switzerland, May 1992.
- Official Selection, IMAGINA 92, Monte-Carlo, Monaco, January 1992.
- Third Dimension Award, SCAM, Paris, FRANCE, November 1991.
- Best Screenplay award, Paris Cité ‘91, Paris, FRANCE, October 1991.
- Official Selection, EUROGRAPHICS 91, Vienna, Austria, September 1991.
- Honorary Mention, Ars Electronica, Linz, Austria, September 1991.
- Official Selection, Images du Futur, Montreal, Canada, September 1991.
- 1st Prize, Artistic Animation Category, Truevision Videographic Competition, SIGGRAPH, Las Vegas, USA, July 1991.
