= Alexandre Obolensky =

Belgian painter, scenic designer, and exhibition designer (1952–2018)

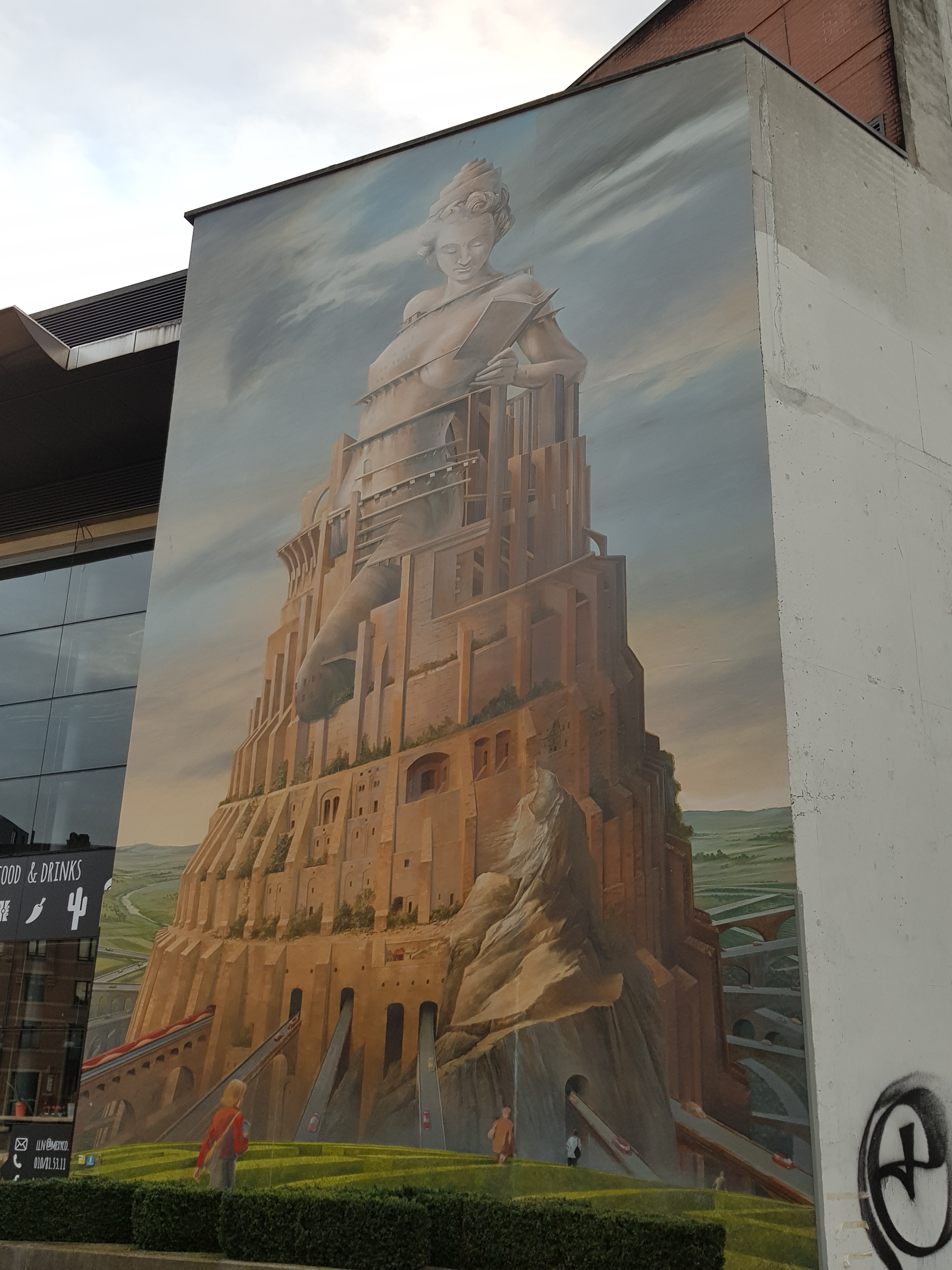
La Tour Infinie (2010), designed by François Schuiten and painted by Alexandre Obolensky

Alexandre Obolensky (1952–2018) was a Belgian painter, scenic designer and exhibition designer.

Obolensky was born in Brussels in 1952. He graduated from the Institut Saint-Luc in 1970. From 1978 he was employed as a set painter by La Monnaie, becoming an independent artist and designer in 1982. As a freelancer he worked for various theatres, ballets and operas, in several countries, including the Théâtre du Rond-Point in Paris. Together with François Schuiten he produced a number of murals, including La Tour Infinie in Louvain-la-Neuve (2010). The pair also worked together for Expo 2000 in Hanover and Expo 2005 in Aichi, and designed the exhibition space of Train World in Schaarbeek.
