= Tintin and the World of Hergé =

Book by Benoit Peeters

The book cover of Tintin and the World of Hergé (Le monde d'Hergé)

Tintin and the World of Hergé: An Illustrated History (French: Le monde d'Hergé) is a book by Benoit Peeters chronicling the illustrated history of Belgian cartoonist Hergé and his creation The Adventures of Tintin.

== Reception ==
Tintin and the World of Hergé is cited and appears in numerous reading lists of books about Hergé and Tintin.

Entertainment Weekly describes the book as "an admirable account of Tintin that preserves all the mysteries of the little hero".

== Translations of the book ==
- French: Le monde d'Hergé (1983)
- English: Tintin and the World of Hergé: An Illustrated History (1988)
- Swedish: Hergé - Boken om Tintin och hans skapare (1983)
- German: Hergé - Ein Leben für die Comics (1983)
