= Marie-Françoise Plissart =

Belgian photographer and video artist

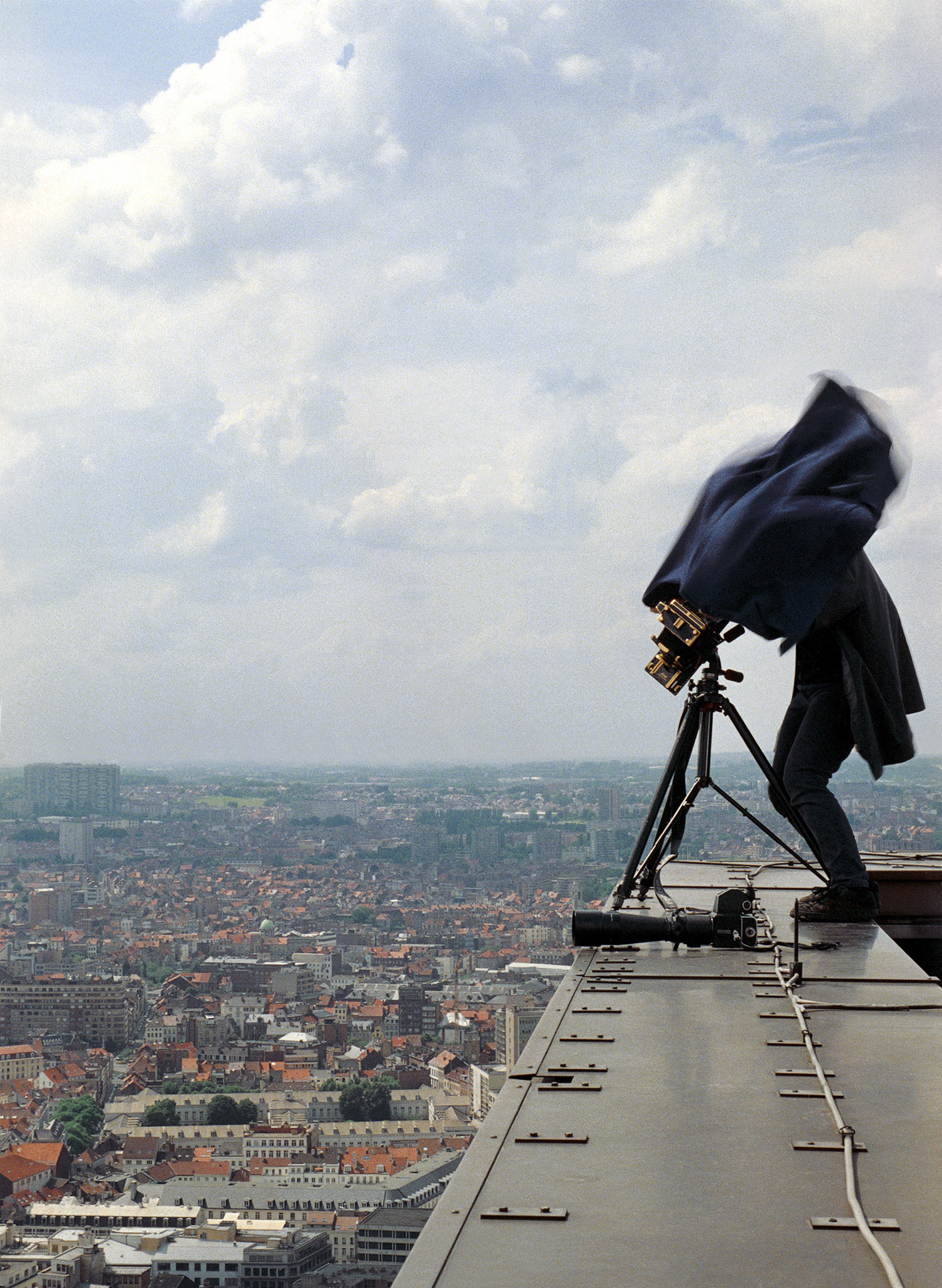
- Born: 1954 (age 71–72); Brussels, Belgium
- Occupations: Photographer, video artist

Marie-Françoise Plissart (born 1954) is a Belgian photographer and video artist.

== Career ==
Plissart explored the photo novel format, collaborating with the comic artist Benoît Peeters in several projects.

Plissart is also known as an architecture photographer. She won a Golden Lion at the 2004 Venice Biennale of Architecture for the exhibition "Kinshasa:The Imaginary City".

== Books ==
- Fugues (with Benoît Peeters), éditions de Minuit, 1983
- Droit de regards (after a lecture by Jacques Derrida), éditions de Minuit, 1985; nouvelle édition: Les Impressions Nouvelles, 2010. (English edition: Rights of Inspection:Monacelli Press, ISBN 978-1580930185)
- Prague (en collaboration avec Benoît Peeters), Autrement, 1985
- Le mauvais œil (in collaboration with Benoît Peeters), éditions de Minuit, 1986
- Aujourd'hui, éditions Arboris, 1993
- Bruxelles, horizon vertical, éditions Prisme, 1998
- Kinshasa, récits de la ville invisible, éditions La Renaissance du Livre/Luc Pire, 2005.
- Mons (in collaboration with Caroline Lamarche, Les Impressions Nouvelles, 2009.

== Exhibitions ==
=== Individual ===
- Droit de regards: Vienna (Musée d'Art Moderne, December 1985), Toulouse (Ombres blanches, March 1986), Berlin (Litteraturhaus, October 1986), the Hague(Centre culturel français, January 1987), Amsterdam (Maison Descartes, March 1987)
- À la recherche du roman-photo: Bruxelles (Palais des Beaux-Arts, June–July 1987), Rotterdam (galerie Perspektief, September 1987), Liège (les Chiroux, January 1989), Geneva (Saint-Gervais, November 1989)
- Aujourd’hui, Charleroi: Charleroi, Musée de la Photographie, Octobre 1993)
- Bruxelles brûle-t-il?: Brussels (Kunstenfestivaldesarts, Beursschouwburg, May 1994)
- Martini, Martini, Bxl, Beursschouwburg: Brussels (KunstenfestivaldesArts, May 1996)
- Photo narrative: Eastern Michigan University (Art department, November 1996)
- Brussel’s architecture: Osaka (International House, October 1997)
- Bruxelles, Horizon vertical: Bruxelles (Le Botanique, January 1999)
- Kinshasa, the imaginary city: Venice (Biennale of Architecture, September 2004), Brussels (Bozar, June–September 2005), Johannesburg (June 2006)
- A World without end, rétrospective personnelle, Musée de la photographie d'Anvers (2008).
