= Maurice Benayoun =

French visual artist and theorist (born 1957)

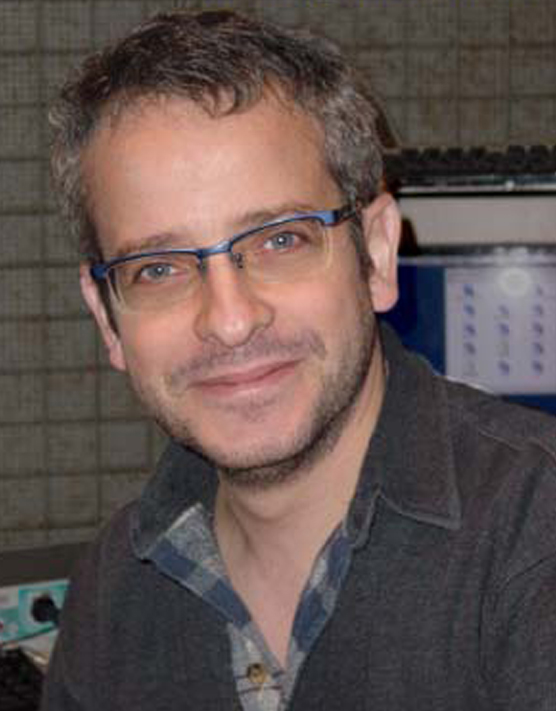
- Maurice Benayoun in 2000
- Born: Maurice Benayoun; 29 March 1957 (age 69); Mascara, French Algeria
- Education: Pantheon-Sorbonne University
- Known for: New Media Art
- Notable work: Quarxs (1991); Tunnel under the Atlantic (1995); World Skin, a Photo Safari in the Land of War (1997)
- Awards: Golden Nica; Ars Electronica 1998, Chevalier des Arts et Lettres 2000, Siggraph 1991, Villa Medicis hors les murs, 1993, Imagina, 1993, International Monitor Awards...
- Website: www.benayoun.com

Maurice Benayoun (born 29 March 1957), also known as MoBen (Chinese: 莫奔), is a French new-media artist, curator, and theorist whose work has been presented internationally in the context of media art and digital culture since the late 1980s. His practice addresses the ways in which emerging technologies influence human perception, social interaction, and contemporary cultural practices.

Benayoun has described his approach as “Open Media,” a term he uses to refer to artistic practices that integrate technological systems, audience participation, and public or networked contexts. His work spans video, computer graphics, immersive virtual reality, internet-based art, performance, EEG, 3D Printing, robotics, artificial intelligence, NFTs, and Blockchain-based based artworks, installations and interactive exhibitions. He is known for large-scale public and urban media projects that engage civic space and participatory processes, often employing data-driven and networked systems to explore relationships between individuals and society.

Since the early 2000s, Benayoun has worked extensively in Asia, contributing to exchanges between Western and East Asian cultural contexts. After spending a decade based in Hong Kong, he has continued his practice and academic activities between Paris and Nanjing.

== Early life ==
Maurice Benayoun was born in Mascara, Algeria, in March 1957. His father, who shared the same name, was killed in 1956, a few months before his birth during the Algerian War of Independence. In 1958, he moved to France with his mother and brother, settling in a working-class suburb in northern Paris, where he spent his childhood.

== Education ==
In the 1970s, Benayoun studied visual arts (plastic arts) at the University of Paris 1 Panthéon-Sorbonne. In 2008, he completed a doctoral thesis titled “Artistic Intention at Work: Hypotheses for Committing Art”, under the supervision of Anne-Marie Duguet. The thesis was later published in 2011 as “The Dump”, drawing on material from his blog of the same name, where he compiled unrealised ideas and projects developed between 2006 and 2011.

== Career ==
While contributing to research at the Department of the University of Paris 8, Benayoun founded his own digital art studio in the late 1980s to connect fiction, architecture, and digital modelling, creating an aesthetic of the virtual well before the arrival of VR headsets. In 1989, he co-founded Z-A Production, which enabled the development of early 3D computer graphics and interactive media projects.

In 2011, he initiated the H2H Lab (Human-to-Human Lab), a consortium of public and private laboratories examining art as a form of human mediation, and contributed to the founding of the Arts-H2H Labex (Lab of Excellence) coordinated by Paris 8 University.During his tenure at Paris 1 University (1984-2009), Benayoun taught at the French National School of Art (ENSBA, 1995-1997) where he was an invited artist and professor.

Since 2014, he has held academic positions outside France, serving as Professor at the School of Creative Media, City University of Hong Kong, where he established the Neuro-Design Lab. He retired from City University in 2023. In 2024, he was appointed Chair Professor at the School of Arts and the School of Architecture and Urban Planning at Nanjing University, China.

== Key concepts ==
Maurice Benayoun has developed a number of conceptual terms in relation to his artistic use of digital, computational, and networked media. The concepts outlined below are limited to those most frequently addressed in published sources and that are directly associated with specific, documented artworks. This section does not attempt to provide an exhaustive theoretical framework, but reflects concepts that recur in critical writing, exhibition contexts, and institutional documentation.

Infra-realism

Benayoun introduced the term infra-realism in the early 1990s during the production of Quarxs (1990–1993), a high-definition computer-generated animation series. The term describes a representational approach in which images are produced through algorithmic simulation of physical, dynamic, and optical processes rather than through the recording of reflected light. In Quarxs, visual form is generated by computational rules governing behaviour and interaction, situating the work within early developments in procedural and generative animation.

Virtuality

Benayoun’s conception of virtuality emerged through his engagement with immersive digital environments in the mid-1990s, prior to the commercial dissemination of virtual-reality systems. Works such as The Tunnel under the Atlantic (1995) and World Skin, A Photo Safari in the Land of War (1997–1998) were realised in research and institutional contexts where VR technologies remained experimental. In interviews and writings, Benayoun has referenced philosophical accounts of virtuality associated with Henri Bergson and Gilles Deleuze, describing virtuality as a state of potentiality rather than as a simulation of an alternative world.

Art-object, art-subject, and artificial intentionality

From the late 2000s onward, Benayoun articulated a distinction between the art-object, understood as a static artefact, and the art-subject, defined as an artwork capable of perceiving, responding to, or interacting with its environment. In this context, he introduced the term artificial intentionality to describe behavioural systems designed to produce responses that appear oriented or purposeful, without implying consciousness or autonomy in a human sense.

Society of agents

The concept of a society of agents, referenced in media-art discourse in the late 2000s, is used by Benayoun to describe artworks composed of multiple human and non-human components, each assigned distinct roles or interpretive functions. This approach is evident in projects that combine audience participation with algorithmic, robotic, or data-driven agents.

Transactional aesthetics and neuro-design

Benayoun’s notion of transactional aesthetics addresses symbolic, affective, and economic exchanges as artistic material, particularly within networked and peer-to-peer environments. Related works extend these ideas through the use of blockchain technologies, in which abstract values are generated as digital entities and circulated within systems of exchange. The concept of neuro-design appears in works involving EEG-based brain–computer interaction, where recorded brain activity influences the generation or modulation of digital forms. Benayoun has described this model using the term Hu-GAN (Human Generative Adversarial Network), in which human participants function as evaluative components within generative systems.

Sublimation, reification, and critical fusion

Drawing in part on Marxist terminology, Benayoun has employed the terms sublimation and reification to describe processes through which continuous sensorial or emotional experience is converted into data and subsequently transformed into objects or commodities. The term critical fusion is used to describe the integration of virtual processes into public or infrastructural contexts, as distinct from decorative applications of large-scale media displays.

== Selected works ==
This section lists a selection of Maurice Benayoun’s artworks and projects in chronological order. The list is not exhaustive and focuses on works that have been widely exhibited, documented, or discussed in institutional or critical contexts.

=== 1990s ===
- Quarxs (1990–1993) — Computer-generated animation series.
- The Tunnel under the Atlantic (1995) — Networked virtual-reality installation presented at Centre Pompidou (Paris) and Ars Electronica (Linz).
- World Skin, A Photo Safari in the Land of War (1997–1998) — Immersive virtual-reality installation; Golden Nica, Prix Ars Electronica (1998).

=== 2000s ===
- Cosmopolis – Overwriting the City (2005) — Large-scale interactive audiovisual installation.
- Mechanics of Emotions (initiated 2005) — Real-time data-driven installation visualising collective emotional states.
- NeORIZON (2008) — Interactive urban media installation presented at the eArts Festival, Shanghai.

=== 2010s ===
- IN OUT (2011) — Networked participatory art project.
- Art Collider (2011) — Collaborative platform exploring peer-to-peer and transactional modes of artistic production.
- Open Sky Project (2014–2016) — Large-scale urban media platform presented on the LED façade of Hong Kong’s International Commerce Centre.
- Brain Factory and Value of Values (initiated 2016) — Participatory installation incorporating EEG-mediated interaction.

=== 2020s ===
- DïaloG (2022) — Robotic and AI-based installation developed within the EU-funded MindSpaces programme; presented at ISEA 2022, Barcelona.
- Morphogenesis of Values (2022) — Installation extending the Value of Values project through data-driven and participatory processes.
- Power Chess (2021) — Robotic installation staging a chess match between programmed mechanical arms.

== Interactive Exhibition Design and Cultural-Heritage Projects ==
In addition to his media-art installations, Benayoun has produced interactive exhibition designs for museums and cultural institutions. His projects include Cosmopolis - Overwriting the City (2005), an immersive audiovisual environment presented during the Année de la France en Chine in Shanghai, Beijing, Chengdu and Chongqing, which explored representations of urban space through large-scale interactive interfaces.

He also developed installations for the Cité des Sciences et de l’Industrie in Paris, such as the Navigation Room for the exhibition New Image, New Networks (1997) and The Membrane for The Man Transformed (2001).

Additional commissions include multimedia interpretation work for heritage sites such as the Abbaye de Fontevraud and an audiovisual installation for the Arc de Triomphe in Paris. These projects extend his research on interaction and digital mediation into museum, urban and public-space contexts.

== Major Curatorial Projects in Media Art ==
Maurice Benayoun has been involved in several media art exhibitions and initiatives that integrate digital technologies and public display systems. In Fleeting Light: The 4th Large-scale Interactive Media Arts Exhibition (2014), co-curated with Jeffrey Shaw, he contributed to a programme presenting international works based on light and interactive media.

As the Initiator and Curator of the Open Sky Project (2014–2016), Benayoun developed a platform for presenting generative and video artworks on the 77,000-square-metre LED façade covering all sides of Hong Kong’s International Commerce Centre, one of the largest architectural media screens in the world. The project also included Open Sky Campus, an educational component that enabled university students to produce and exhibit works using the same display system.

In Ars Electronica Garden Hong Kong 2020 and 2021, Benayoun served as Lead Curator for the Hong Kong edition of Ars Electronica’s distributed festival, organising exhibitions and online programmes related to digital art, virtual environments, and interactive technologies.

== Recognition ==
- Award in the "Pioneers" Category, e-Culture Awards 2023, Anilla Cultural, Latin America – Europa en Uruguay, 2023.
- Visionary Pioneer of Media Art (nomination), the Prix Ars Electronica, 2014.
- SACD Award, Interactive Arts. Société des Auteurs et Compositeurs Dramatiques. June 2009.
- Golden Nica (first prize), interactive art category (World Skin), Ars Electronica Festival, Linz, Austria, 1998.
- Jose Abel Prize (Quarxs), Best European animation film, Cinanima, Animation Film Festival of Espinho, Portugal, October 1994.
- Best Electronic Special Effects, International Monitor Awards, Los Angeles, 1993.
- Best Video Paint Design, International Monitor Award, Los Angeles 1993.
- First Prize Pixel INA, Opens Title category Imagina '93, Monte Carlo, February 1993.
- First Prize, Third Dimension Award (The Quarxs), SCAM, Paris, November 1991.
- 1st Prize, Artistic Animation category (The Quarxs), Truevision competition, SIGGRAPH, Las Vegas, 1991.

== General sources ==
- ADA, Archive of Digital Art, Missing Matter,
- FMX/09, Paris ACM SIGGRAPH, ZA Story, the Quarxs, God and the Devil,, 2009
- Benayoun, M.,"A Nano-Leap for Mankind" in The Dump, 207 Hypotheses for Committing Art, bilingual (English/French) Fyp éditions, France, July 2011, pp. 349–351. ISBN 978-2-916571-64-5
- Benayoun, M., , "Architecture reactive de la communication" (French), July 1998
