= Autrique House =

Historic Art Nouveau house in Brussels, Belgium

- Maison Autrique (French); Huis Autrique (Dutch)
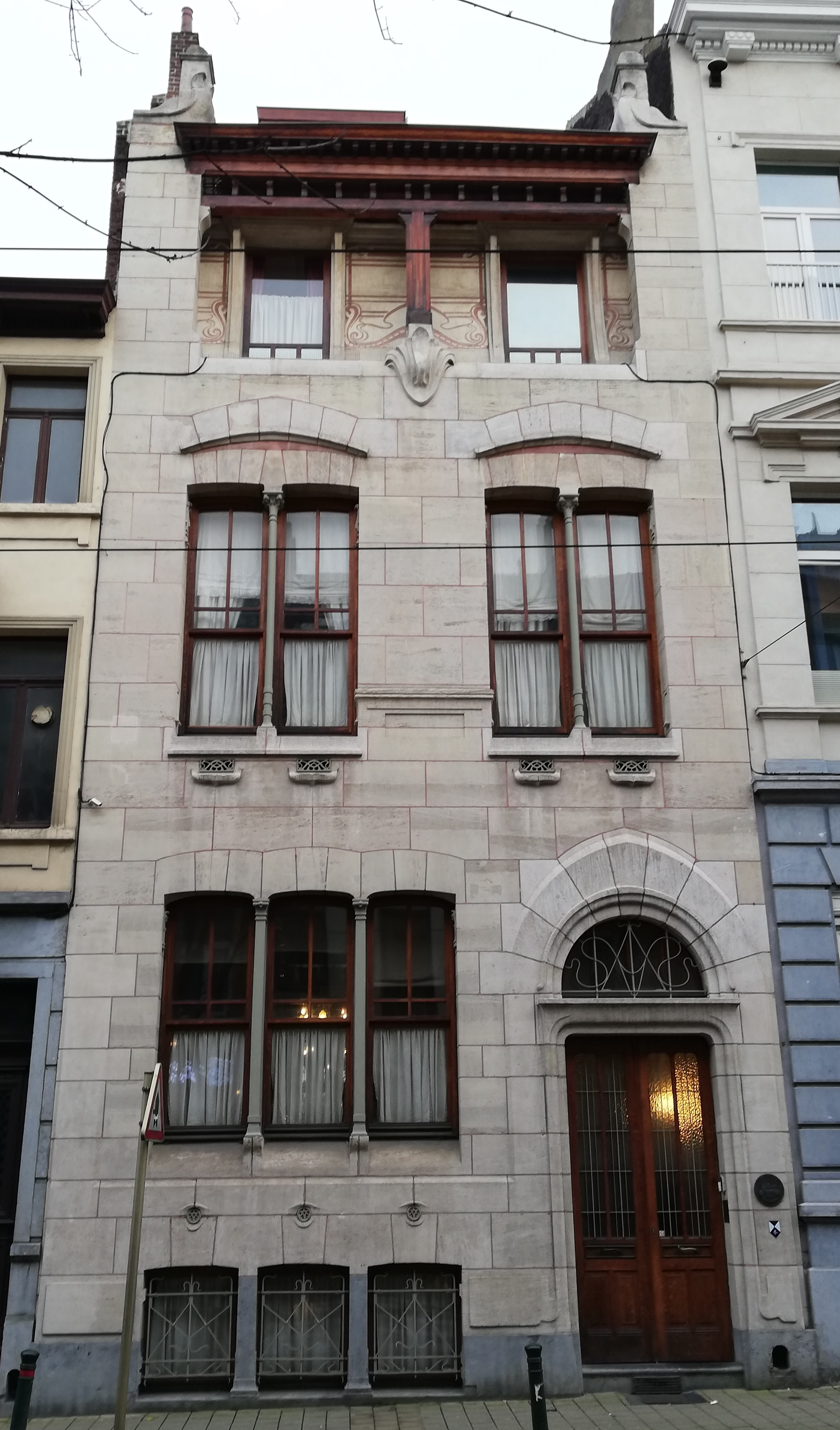
- Main façade of the Autrique House

General information
- Type: Town house
- Architectural style: Art Nouveau
- Location: Chaussée de Haecht / Haachtsesteenweg 266, 1030 Schaerbeek, Brussels-Capital Region, Belgium
- Coordinates: 50°51′47″N 4°22′23″E
- Current tenants: Schaerbeek municipality
- Completed: 1893
- Client: Eugène Autrique

Design and construction
- Architect: Victor Horta
- Awards: Medal Europa Nostra 2005

Website
- www.autrique.be/en

The Autrique House (French: Maison Autrique; Dutch: Huis Autrique or Autriquehuis) is a historic town house in Brussels, Belgium. This house, built in 1893, was the first designed by Victor Horta in Art Nouveau style, and represents an essential step in the evolution of the Belgian architect. In many ways, it was an innovative dwelling, although it does not feature the novel spatial composition of the almost contemporary Hôtel Tassel. It is located at 266, chaussée de Haecht/Haachtsesteenweg, in the municipality of Schaerbeek.

The Autrique House was built for the engineer Eugène Autrique and his family. Due to budget restrictions, the family wanted a simple but comfortable home. For this reason, many custom made details, which Horta designed himself in most of the other town houses he built, were abolished. The house was kept in a relatively good condition during the 20th century. In the 1990s, it was bought by the municipality of Schaerbeek. It was thoroughly renovated and is now opened to the public.

== History ==
Built by Victor Horta in 1893 for his friend Eugène Autrique, the Autrique House constitutes the missing link between traditional private architecture and the emerging Art Nouveau style. All typical Art Nouveau characteristics are already present in this early work of Horta: fine iron pillars and columns of the façade, sgraffito, stained glass, mosaics, and importance of natural light and decorative elements of floral inspiration. These characteristics were to be developed and magnified by Horta and his disciples.

In July 2006, the European heritage organisation Europa Nostra gave a "Medal" or second prize "for the meticulous restoration of an early masterpiece by Victor Horta and for the creation of a scenography that pays tribute to the private architecture of Brussels, while opening the door to an imaginary world."

== Building ==
The Autrique House was the first town house built by Victor Horta. This dwelling was already innovative for its application of a novel Art Nouveau decorative scheme that did not include references to other historical styles. However, the floor plan and spatial composition of the Autrique House remained rather traditional. On the deep and narrow building plot, the rooms were organised according to a traditional scheme used in most Belgian town houses at that time. It consisted of a suite of rooms on the left side of the building plot, flanked by a rather narrow entrance hall with stairs and a corridor that led to a small garden at the back. From the three-room suite, only the first and the last had windows, and so the middle room, used mostly as a dining room, was rather gloomy.

== Awards ==
In 2005, the Autrique House received the Medal of Europa Nostra for "the scrupulous restoration of an early masterpiece of Victor Horta, and for the creation of a scenography which pays tribute to the private architecture of Brussels and opens a door to an imaginary world."

== Gallery ==
Detail of the façade

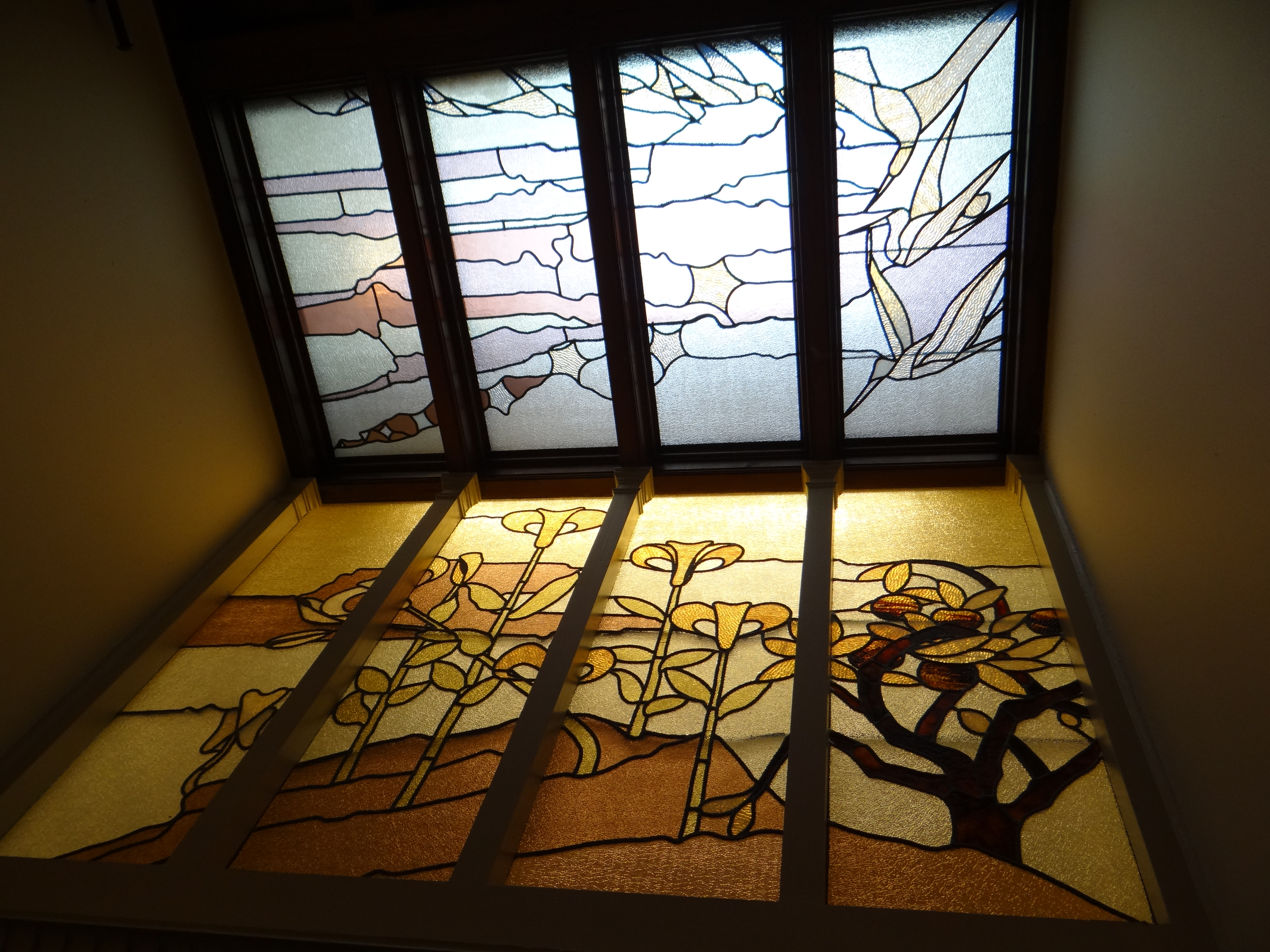
Skylight above the stairway

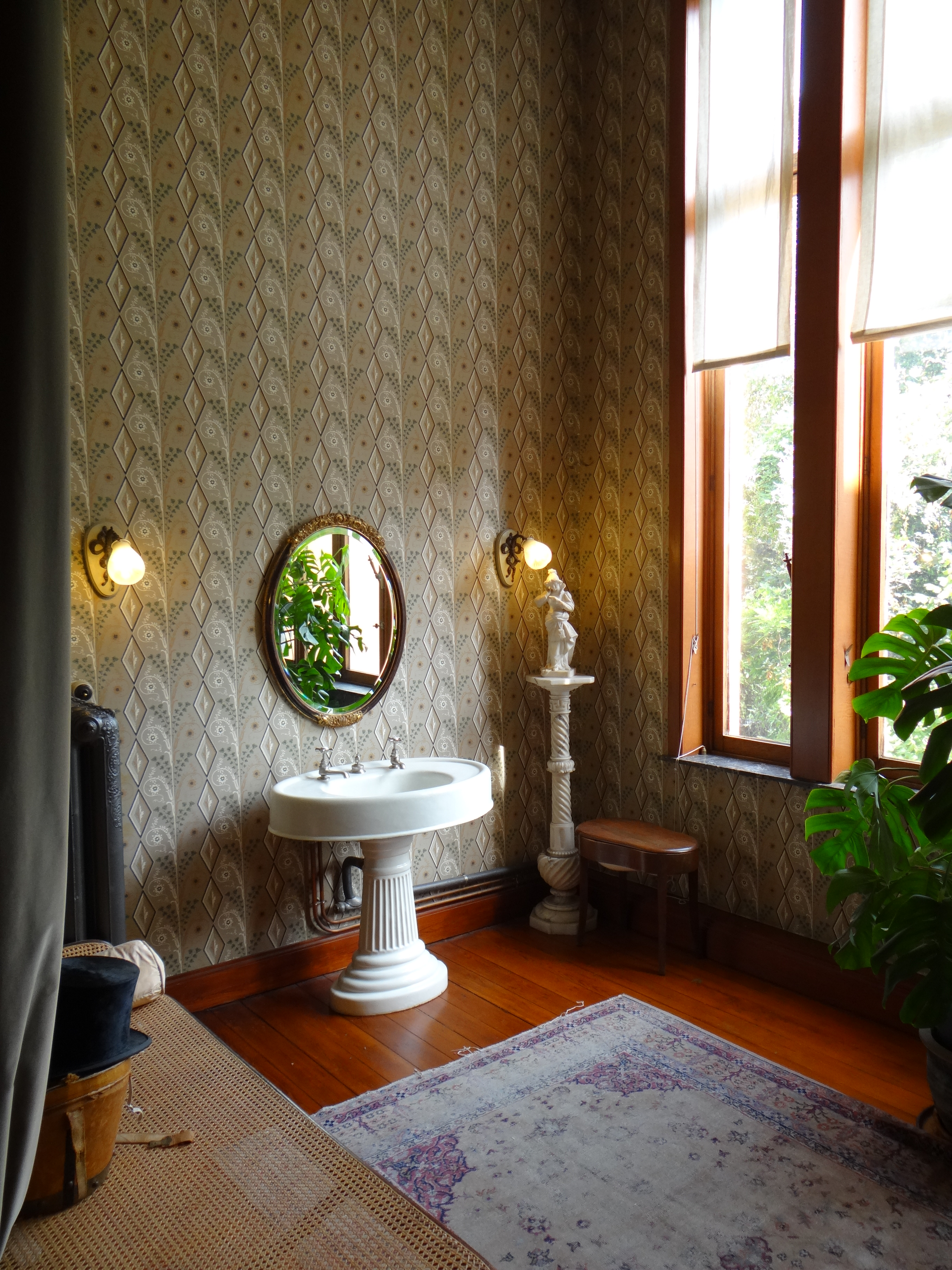
View from the bedroom into the toilet cabinet

== See also ==
- List of museums in Brussels
- Art Nouveau in Brussels
- History of Brussels
- Culture of Belgium
- Belgium in the long nineteenth century
