= François Schuiten =

Belgian comic book artist

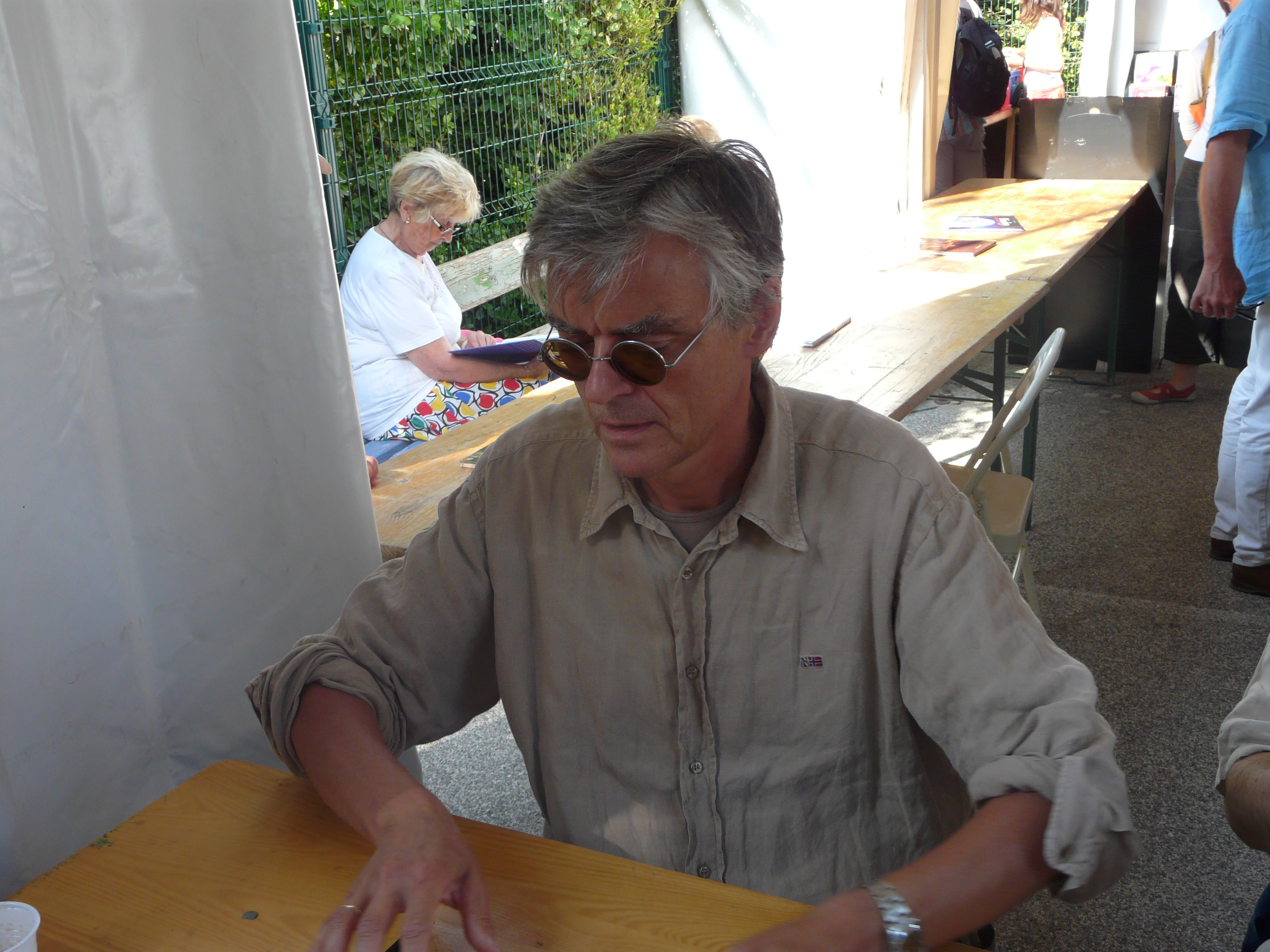
- Born: 26 April 1956 (age 70) Brussels, Belgium
- Area: Artist

François Schuiten (born 26 April 1956) is a Belgian comic book artist. He is best known for drawing the series Les Cités Obscures.

== Biography ==
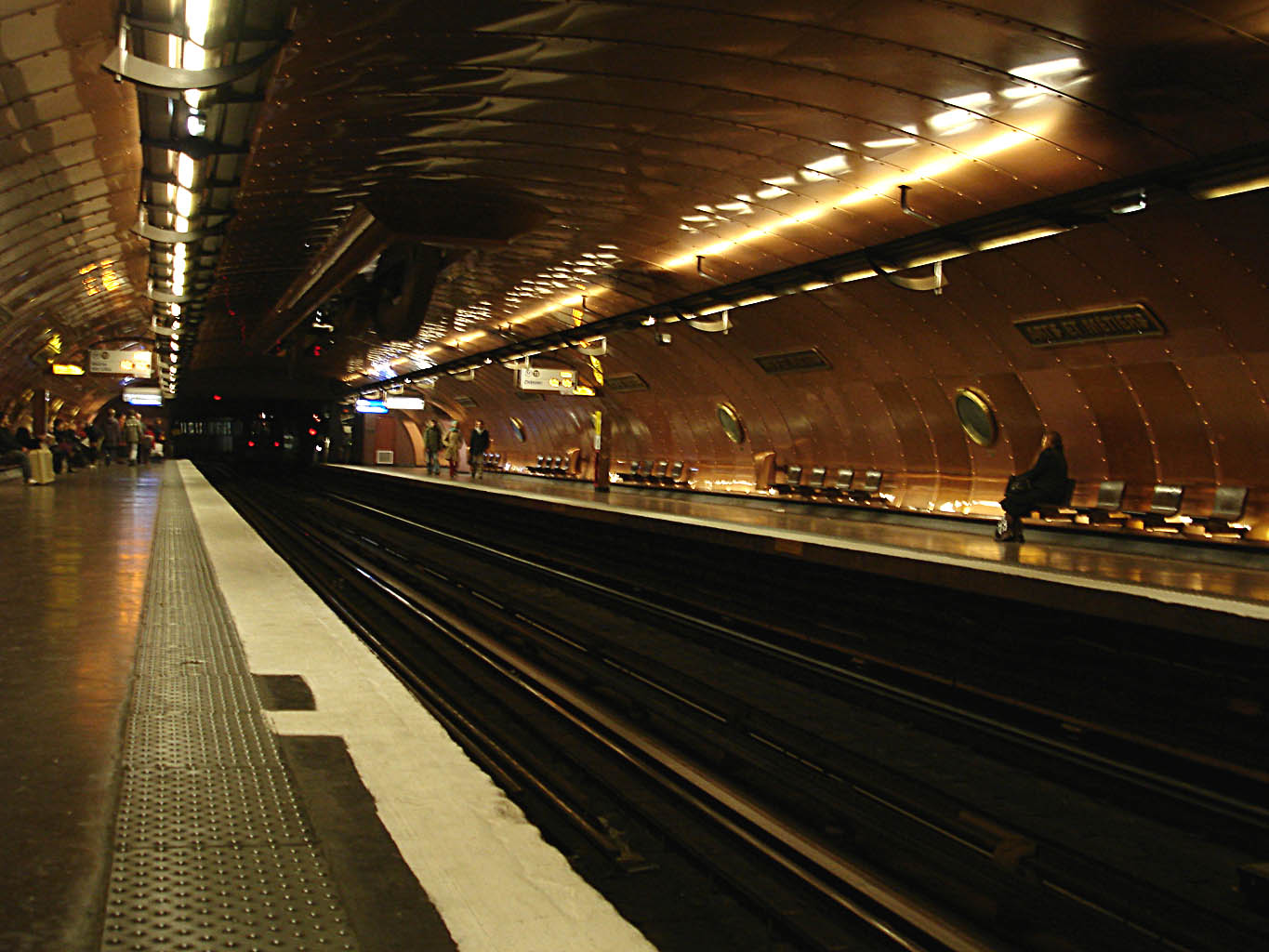
Arts et Métiers Métro station in Paris, drawn up by François Schuiten

François Schuiten was born in Brussels, Belgium, in 1956. His father, Robert Schuiten, and his mother, Marie-Madeleine De Maeyer, were both architects. He has five brothers and sisters, one of whom is also an architect.

During his studies at the Saint-Luc Institute in Brussels (1975–1977), he met Claude Renard, who led the comics department at the school. Together they created several books. Schuiten's brother Luc Schuiten also worked with him several times as a writer for the series Terres Creuses.

Schuiten published his first comic on 3 May 1973, consisting of five black and white pages in the Franco-Belgian comics magazine Pilote; four years later he was published in the more experimental magazine Métal Hurlant. He married Monique Toussaint in 1980; they have four children.

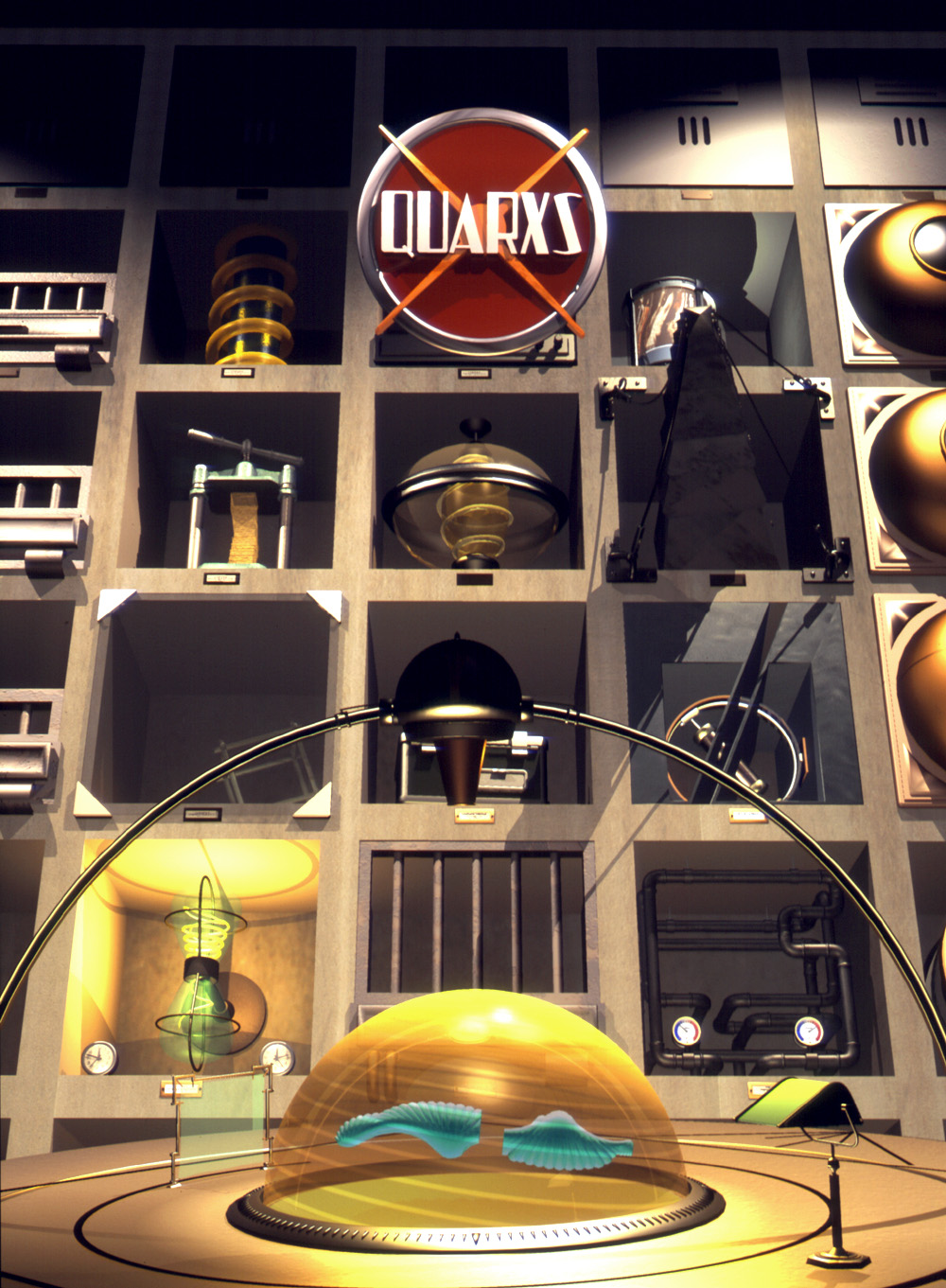
Quarxs, 3D animation series, Maurice Benayoun (1991)

Schuiten's love of architecture became apparent in the series Cities of the Fantastic, an evocation of fantastic, partly imaginary cities that he created with his friend Benoît Peeters from 1983 for the Belgian monthly comics magazine À Suivre. Every story focuses on one city or building, and further explores a world where architects, urbanists, and ultimately "urbatects", are the leading powers and architecture is the driving force behind society. Styles explored in the series include Stalinist and fascist architecture in La Fièvre d'Urbicande, skyscrapers in Brüsel, but also the Gothic cathedrals in La Tour. This fascination with architecture and the possible and impossible cities it can generate is further explored in The Gates of the Possible, a weekly series Schuiten created for the newspapers Le Soir and De Morgen in 2005.

Inspired by artists and scientists alike, Schuiten's work can be considered to mix the mysterious worlds of René Magritte, the early scientific fantasies of Jules Verne, the graphical worlds of M. C. Escher and Gustave Doré, and the architectural visions of Victor Horta and Étienne-Louis Boullée. The creative synergy between Schuiten's work and the books of Jules Verne culminated in 1994 when he was asked to illustrate and design a cover for the publication of Verne's rediscovered book Paris in the Twentieth Century.

Schuiten also collaborated with Maurice Benayoun on the computer graphics series Quarxs, and worked as a production designer for a few movies: Gwendoline by Just Jaeckin, Mr. Nobody and Toto le héros by Jaco Van Dormael, Taxandria by Raoul Servais, The Golden Compass by Chris Weitz and Mars et Avril by Martin Villeneuve. He worked with Benoît Sokal and Martin Villeneuve on the script of Aquarica, a film that would use CGI and motion capture technology., but the project was abandoned due to the death of Benoît Sokal

As a scenographer, Schuiten designed the metro stations of Porte de Hal/Hallepoort in Brussels and Arts et Métiers in Paris, and a mural in Brussels. In 2000, he designed the scenography for A planet of visions, one of the main pavilions of the Expo 2000 in Hannover, which attracted more than five million visitors. In 2004–05, a large exhibition was held in Leuven, The Gates of Utopia, showing different aspects of his work. He also created the interior of the Belgian pavilion at the Expo 2005 in Aichi, Japan, with the painter Alexandre Obolensky. François Schuiten has also designed fifteen Belgian stamps.

Schuiten together with Peeters also helped to save and subsequently restore the Autrique House in Brussels, the first house designed by Art Nouveau architect Victor Horta.

== Awards ==
- 2025: Honorary doctorate VUB and ULB
- 2022: Eisner award for Best U.S. Edition of International Material: The Shadow of a Man
- 2013: Grand Prize in the Manga category of the Japan Media Arts Festival
- 2002: Made a baron by King Albert II of Belgium
- 2002: Grand Prix de la ville d'Angoulême, France
- 1998: Special Prize of the Jury at the Max & Moritz Prizes, Erlangen, Germany
- 1996: Inkpot Award, U.S.
- 1987: Grand Prix at the festival of Sierre, Switzerland
- 1985: Award for the Best Comic Book at the Angoulême International Comics Festival, France
- 1983: Samaris, the first book of Les Cités Obscures, is chosen as one of the 20 best books of the year by French magazine Lire

== Bibliography ==
- Les Cités Obscures: 1983-, 11 albums and some specials, with Benoît Peeters: Casterman
- Dolorès: 1991, 1 album, artist Anne Baltus: Casterman
- Express: 1981, 1 album, with Claude Renard: Magic-Strip
- Les Machinistes: 1 album, 1984, with Claude Renard: Les Humanoïdes Associés
- Métamorphoses: 2 albums, 1980–1982, with Claude Renard: Les Humanoïdes Associés
- Plagiat!: 1 album, 1989, with Benoît Peeters, written by Goffin: Les Humanoïdes Associés
- Souvenirs de l'éternel present: 1 album, 1993, written by Benoît Peeters: Arboris
- La Douce: 1 album, 2012: Casterman (translated into English as The Beauty).
- Les terres creuses: 3 albums, 1980–1990, written by Luc Schuiten: Les Humanoïdes Associés

Works by François Schuiten have been translated in most European languages, including Dutch, German, Danish and English.
