= À Suivre =

Franco-Belgian comics magazine

À Suivre/Wordt Vervolgd
- À Suivre #11. Cover artwork by Ted Benoît.
- Editor: Jean-Paul Mougin (French); Marc Jongbloet (Dutch)
- Categories: Comics magazine
- Frequency: Monthly
- Publisher: Casterman
- First issue: February 1978; 48 years ago (French); October 1980; 45 years ago (Dutch)
- Final issue: December 1997; 28 years ago (French); July 1986; 39 years ago (Dutch)
- Country: Belgium
- Language: French; Dutch

À Suivre or (A SUIVRE) (English translation: "To Be Continued") was a Belgian comics magazine published from February 1978 to December 1997 by the Casterman publishing house, and was preceded by a "0", or test, issue in October 1977. Along with the comic book magazines Spirou, Tintin, Pilote, and Métal hurlant, it is considered to have been one of the major vehicles for the development of Franco-Belgian bande dessinées (BDs) during the late 20th century, most notably by providing a specific platform for the publication of BDs intended for a mature readership. It was particularly in light of the latter intent that, in the process, the magazine became a pioneering medium for the introduction and embracement of graphic novels in Europe.

== History and profile ==
À Suivre was established by Casterman publishing house in 1978. The magazine was published on a monthly basis. It presented the work of major European graphic novel artists including Hugo Pratt, Jean-Claude Forest, Alexandro Jodorowsky, Milo Manara, Masse, Jean (Mœbius) Giraud, Jacques Tardi, François Bourgeon, F'Murr, Ted Benoît, Guido Crepax, Vittorio Giardino, François Schuiten, Benoît Sokal and François Boucq.

In the early 1990s, À Suivre was printed almost in full colour. Publication ceased in December 1997 after 239 regular, and 6 special, issues had been released, with an exclusive commemorative special issue following suit in 2004.

Since Belgium is officially bilingual, the magazine became published in Dutch under the title Wordt Vervolgd (literal translation of the French title) as well, starting in October 1980. However, publication in Dutch ceased in July 1989 after 97 regular, and 2 special, issues.

== See also ==
- List of magazines in Belgium
