= Europe Comics =

European publishing company

- Europe Comics logo
- Founded: 2015
- Distribution: Izneo, ComiXology, Apple, Google, Amazon, Kobo, OverDrive
- Publication types: Comic books and graphic novels for adults and younger readers; fiction and non-fiction
- Official website: www.europecomics.com

Europe Comics is a pan-European comics and graphic novel digital venture run by 13 European comics publishers from eight European countries. The project received funding in 2015 from the European Commission's Creative Europe Programme, and launched officially in November of that year.

The purpose of the initiative is the development of a lesser-known but ample European literary genre, European comics, through the formation of a collective English-language digital catalogue, the organization of author tours and events across Europe and North America, and the creation of a website meant for comics readers and professionals.

On 12 January 2023, Europe Comics announced it would stop their "consumer-facing activities" (website, social media, newsletters, events); the initiative announced it will still release new digital comics through online retailers.

== Partners ==
- Akan Ajans (rights agency, Turkey)
- Ballon Media (publisher, Belgium)
- BAO Publishing (publisher, Italy)
- Cinebook (publisher, UK)
- Dargaud (publisher, France)
- Darkwood (publisher, Serbia)
- Dibbuks (publisher, Spain)
- Dupuis (publisher, Belgium)
- Ellipsanime Productions (animation studio, France)
- Le Lombard (publisher, Belgium)
- Mediatoon Licensing (rights agency, France)
- Timof i Cisi Wspólnicy (publisher, Poland)
- Tunué (publisher, Italy)

== Catalog ==
The Europe Comics catalog consists of original works from each publisher of the project, translated in English and published digitally. Selected titles include:

- The Adventures of Jerome Katzmeier (François Boucq, Le Lombard)
- Agrippina (Claire Bretécher, Dargaud)
- Blacksad (Juan Díaz Canales and Juanjo Guarnido, Dargaud)
- Djinn (Jean Dufaux and Ana Mirallès, Dargaud)
- Gipsy (Enrico Marini and Thierry Smolderen, Dargaud)
- Globetrotting Viola (Stefano Turconi and Teresa Radice, Tunué)
- Jeremy (Jef Nys, Ballon)
- Keepers of Lost Time (Miroslav Marić and Vujadin Radovanović, Darkwood)
- Kobane Calling (Zerocalcare, BAO Publishing)
- The Man Who Shot Lucky Luke (Matthieu Bonhomme, inspired by Lucky Luke, Dargaud/Lucky Comics)
- Michel Vaillant (Jean Graton, Dupuis)
- The Midlife Crisis (Florence Cestac, Dargaud)
- Murena (Jean Dufaux and Philippe Delaby, Dargaud)
- Noir (Łukasz Bogacz and Wojciech Stefaniec, Timof)
- Portugal (Cyril Pedrosa, Dupuis)
- The Suicide Forest (El Torres and Gabriel Hernández, Dibbuks)
- Valerian and Laureline (Pierre Christin and Jean-Claude Mézières, Dargaud)
- The Famous Quartet of Piraeus (Giorgos Skabardonis, Dimitris Kerasidis, Mikros Iros)

== Events ==
Since its launch, Europe Comics and its authors have participated in a number of comics and book events such as comic conventions (including San Diego Comic-Con and the New York Comic Con), European book events (the London Book Fair and Frankfurt Book Fair) and a variety of independent comics events such as the Small Press Expo and the Brooklyn Book Festival in the United States.

== Online directory ==
As described in the official summary of the Europe Comics initiative, one of the "tangible ... outcomes of the project will be the creation of a European comics directory with statistical information on markets and trends," intended as a reference for both comics fans and professionals in the comics field (including publishers, journalists, and scholars).
