= IRS (disambiguation) =

IRS is the United States Internal Revenue Service, the revenue service of the U.S. federal government.

IRS, irs, or IRs may also refer to:

== Arts and entertainment ==
- I.R.S. Records, an American record label
- "I.R.S." (song), a song by Guns N' Roses
- Irwin R. Schyster, a ring name of Mike Rotunda
- IR$, a Franco-Belgian comics series

== Avionics ==
- Inertial reference system, continuously computed dead reckoning

== Economics ==
- Indian Revenue Service, the Indian taxation agency
- Interest rate swap, a linear interest rate derivative involving exchange of interest rates between two parties
- Internal Revenue Service (Ghana), the Ghanaian tax institution
- Imposto sobre Rendimentos Singulares (IRS), the Portuguese tax over personal income

== Organisations ==
- Independence Republic of Sardinia, a political party, Italy
- Leibniz Institute for Research on Society and Space, of the Leibniz Association

== Medicine ==
- Indoor residual spraying, a process of spraying insecticides inside residences to prevent malaria
- Insulin receptor substrate, a group of signaling proteins
  - Insulin receptor substrate 1, a protein found in humans
  - Insulin receptor substrate 2, a protein-coding gene in the species Homo sapiens
- Intergroup Rhabdomyosarcoma Study Group, a clinical trial cooperative group

== Transportation ==
- Independent rear suspension, a form of car independent suspension
- International Railway Solution, the International Union of Railways leaflets
- International Railway Systems, a Romanian company
- IRS Aero, Russia
- IRS Airlines, Nigeria
- Kirsch Municipal Airport (FAA code: IRS)

== Other uses ==
- International Rules Series, an international football competition
- Indian Remote Sensing satellite, an Earth observation satellite
- Indian Readership Survey, a continuous readership research study
- Institutionalized riot systems, an interpretative paradigm
- Integrated reception system, for TV and radio signals
- Infrared spectrum, a form of electromagnetic radiation
- WP:IRS, a redirect to Wikipedia:Reliable sources
