= IR =

IR or Ir may refer to:

== Arts and media ==
- Ir (newspaper), Latvian weekly newspaper
- Imperator: Rome, a 2019 video game published by Paradox Interactive
- Integrated resort, a euphemism for a casino in Singapore
- International Relations (journal), an academic journal
- I.R. Baboon, a fictional character in the cartoon series I Am Weasel

== Businesses and organizations ==
=== Transportation ===
- Iarnród Éireann (Irish Rail), national passenger and freight railway system of the Republic of Ireland
- Illinois Railway, US
- Indian Railways, state-owned railway company of India
- InterRegio, part of Swiss Federal Railways
- IR Ishikawa Railway, local railway company in Ishikawa, Japan
- Iran Air (IATA airline code IR)
- Israel Railways, state-owned railway company of Israel

=== Other businesses and organizations ===
- Ingersoll Rand (NYSE trading symbol IR)
- International Rectifier, a former manufacturer of power semiconductors
- Independent-Republican Party of Minnesota, former name of the Republican Party of Minnesota

== Finance ==
- Incidence rate (market research)
- Interest rate, or (when referring to an asset class) interest rate derivative
- Information ratio, when referring to risk-adjusted returns of a financial security
- Investor relations, a management responsibility in which companies disclose information for regulatory compliance and for bond/share-holders to make investment judgments

== Language ==
- Ir (cuneiform), a sign in cuneiform writing
- Ir language, also known as Ta'Oi language, spoken in parts of Laos and Vietnam
- Istro-Romanian language

== Places ==
- Indian Reserve, a section of land in Canada that is controlled by an Indigenous band government
- Iran, by ISO country code

== Science and technology ==
=== Biology and medicine ===
- Immediate-release, related to time release technology in pharmaceuticals
- Incidence Rate, in epidemiology
- Insulin receptor, a transmembrane receptor that is activated by insulin
- Insulin resistance, a pathological condition
- Interventional radiology and interventional radiologist, an independent medical specialty
- Inverted repeat, a sequence of nucleotides that is the reversed complement of another sequence further downstream

=== Computing ===
- .ir, the Internet country code top-level domain for Iran
- Adobe ImageReady, a bitmap graphics editor shipped with Adobe Photoshop by Adobe Systems
- Image retention, the LCD and plasma display equivalent of screen burn
- Information retrieval, the science of searching for information in or as documents or databases
- Information revolution, one of the theoretical frameworks within which trends in current society can be conceptualized
- Institutional repository, a digital collection for preserving the intellectual output of an institution
- Institutional research, the collection, analysis, and reporting of institutional data
- Instruction register, part of a CPU's control unit
- Intermediate representation, a computer data structure
- Internal router

=== Other uses in science and technology ===
- Imaginary numbers, in mathematics, denoted $\text{i}\mathbb{R}$ or iR
- Infrared, a portion of the electromagnetic radiation spectrum
- Impulse response, an output function of a dynamic system presented with a brief input signal
- Insulation resistance, a measure of insulation material performance
- Ionizing radiation
- Iridium, symbol Ir, a chemical element

== Other uses ==
- Imperial–royal, abbreviation applied to institutions of the Austrian Empire
- Industrial relations, relations between management and workers in industry
- Ingenieur, abbreviated ir., an engineer's degree awarded by technical universities in the Netherlands, Belgium, Indonesia, and Malaysia
- Injured reserve list, a list of professional sports players who are injured and unable to play for an extended time
- International relations, in political science, the study of foreign affairs of and relations among states
- International rules football a hybrid code of football

== See also ==
- $\mathbb{R}$, the symbol of the set of real numbers in mathematics
- Inland Revenue Department (disambiguation), a government revenue service in several countries
- International Rescue (disambiguation)
- IRS (disambiguation)
