= Billy the Cat (TV series) =

- Genre: Adventure; Slapstick comedy
- Directed by: Les Orton; Jean-François Laguionie; Jean Pierre Jacquet
- Voices of: Jesse Moss; Michael Donovan; Kelly Sheridan; Robert O. Smith; Brian Drummond
- Opening theme: "Billy the Cat", performed by John Mitchell and Tanya Hancheroff
- Ending theme: "Billy the Cat" (Instrumental)
- Composers: Tom Keenlyside; John Mitchell; David Iris
- Countries of origin: France; Belgium; Canada; Germany
- Original languages: English; French
- No. of seasons: 2
- No. of episodes: 52

Production
- Executive producers: Pierre Levie; Hervé Bédard; Steve Walsh; Patrick Moine; Dale A. Andrews
- Producers: Robin Lyons; Patrick Moine; Sophie Levie; Hervé Bédard
- Running time: 25 minutes
- Production companies: EVA Entertainment; Les Films du Triangle; Dupuis; NOA Network of Animation; Sofidoc S.A. Cologne Cartoon; WIC Entertainment; Siriol Productions; SEK Studio

Original release
- Network: France 3, Canal+ and RTL-TVI (France); ZDF (Germany); Family Channel (Canada); S4C (Wales)
- Release: 1996 – 2001

Billy the Cat is an animated series based on the comic series of the same name, created by cartoonists Stéphane Colman and Stephen Desberg. It was aired from 1996 to 2001 for two seasons, accompanied by two compilation films. The series was produced by EVA Entertainment, in co-production with Les Films du Triangle, Dupuis, NOA Network of Animation, Sofidoc S.A., SEK Studio and Cologne Cartoon for France 3, with the participation of Canal+, ZDF, WIC Entertainment, and RTL-TVI.

== Plot ==
A boy named Billy is transformed into a cat by an angry magician who decides to teach the boy a lesson after seeing him bullying a cat. In order to keep his family from worrying, the magician also uses his magic to make his cat, Dandelion, assume Billy's own form and live with his family. No matter how much he begged during the series, Billy was never turned back into the boy he used to be.

== Characters ==
- Billy Colas (voiced by Jesse Moss in season 1, and by Brian Drummond in season 2) − A young rogue turned into a cat by a magician.
- Mr. Hubert (voiced by Michael Donovan, who also voice directed for the show) − A white cat with a bowtie and Billy's guardian, who teaches him how to survive on the streets. He lives in a Cadillac car in a junkyard and speaks with a British accent.
- Queenie (voiced by Kelly Sheridan) − A female cat who befriends and helps Billy.
- Jumbo (voiced by Ian James Corlett who also writes for the show) − A pigeon who thinks and speaks like an airplane pilot.
- Sanctifur (voiced by Robert O. Smith) − A fierce dark-gray cat with a scar on his face. He is one of Billy, Queenie and Mr. Hubert's worst enemies.
- Moonie (voiced by Terry Klassen who also writes and voice directs for the show) − A Wire Fox Terrier and the leader of the villainous group called the Dead End Dogs, who enjoy bullying cats. He is also another one of Billy, Queenie and Mr. Hubert's worst enemies.
- Ali Kazam the Magician (also voiced by Michael Donovan) − The man responsible for turning Billy into a cat after he saw the troublesome kid bullying a cat. After teaching Billy a lesson, he decided to turn his cat Dandelion into human Billy himself.
- Nick (voiced by Lee Tockar in season 1, and by Bill Switzer in season 2) − One of Billy's former human friends, who doesn't like cats.
- Billy's Mother (voiced by Kathleen Barr) − Billy's worrisome mother who is allergic to cats.

== Episodes ==
=== Season 1 ===
| No. overall | No. in season | Title | Written by | Original release date |
|---|---|---|---|---|
| 1 | 1 | "Billy Becomes a Cat" | Barry Whittaker and Judy Valyi | 1996 |
After pestering a cat, a magician turns Billy into a kitten.
| 2 | 2 | "The Cat That Couldn't Miaow" | Robin Lyons and Andrew Offiler | TBA |
As Billy tries to win the admiration of Blackie and the strays, the theft of a golden cat statue is about to take place...
| 3 | 3 | "Microchips with Everything" | Dennis O'Flaherty | TBA |
Two evil men try to capture Billy after he accidentally swallowed a microchip needed to build an earthquake machine.
| 4 | 4 | "Pigeon Pie" | Robin Lyons and Andrew Offiler | TBA |
A restaurant is open, which not only threatens Grossmeyer's restaurant, but also the pigeons in town, including Jumbo!
| 5 | 5 | "Sewer Cats" | Robin Lyons and Andrew Offiler | TBA |
After Billy saves three kittens from drowning, he bonds with an alligator from his past.
| 6 | 6 | "The Rescue" | Barry Whittaker and Judy Valyi | TBA |
Billy, Queenie, and a few other cats are catnapped by two crooks who intend to sell them as rare-breed cats.
| 7 | 7 | "The Big Meow" | Dennis O'Flaherty | TBA |
Sanctifur is hoarding food, forcing other cats to go hungry.
| 8 | 8 | "The Jolly Mouser" | John Gatehouse | TBA |
BIlly tries to stop a ship captain from selling cats illegally.
| 9 | 9 | "Hubert and the Siamese Siren" | Dennis O'Flaherty | TBA |
Mr. Hubert falls for a gorgeous female Siamese cat, but has a secret...
| 10 | 10 | "A Star Is Born" | Stan Hey | TBA |
A cat food Company uses Mr. Hubert as a mascot.
| 11 | 11 | "A Clockwork Bone" | Doug Molitor | TBA |
Mr. Hubert places Billy in a pet shop, where he is bought by a young girl.
| 12 | 12 | "Catz'n the Hood" | Dennis O'Flaherty | TBA |
Billy and Mr. Hubert try to stop two swindlers from evicting the tenants of a building.
| 13 | 13 | "Cat Burglar" | Dennis O'Flaherty | TBA |
Two crooks intend to rob a hotel guest from another country, and they use Nick, a human friend of Billy's.
| 14 | 14 | "Cool Cat" | S.M. Molitor | TBA |
Billy tries to teach Mr. Hubert that the snow can be fun, while avoiding the Dead End Dogs.
| 15 | 15 | "One of Our Tail Is Missing" | Michael Benyaer | TBA |
Billy and Mr. Hubert help Manx get a tail, by using a worm as a substitute.
| 16 | 16 | "Romeo & Juliet" | Malcolm McGookin | TBA |
Billy helps two dogs, one a stray and the other poodle, reunite.
| 17 | 17 | "Wok on the Wild Side" | Jono Howard | TBA |
Queenie is set to be married to another cat, so Billy and Mr. Hubert work to stop the ceremony.
| 18 | 18 | "The Great Purple Nothing" | Jono Howard | TBA |
BIlly, Mr. Hubert and Queenie stumble upon thieves hiding stolen money in a graveyard.
| 19 | 19 | "Born to Be a Wildcat" | Lee Tockar | TBA |
Billy befriends a stray cat and the two begin to cause trouble across town.
| 20 | 20 | "Monkey Business" | Dennis O'Flaherty | TBA |
Billy and Mr. Hubert help two monkeys escape from the circus.
| 21 | 21 | "Snowbound" | John Gatehouse | TBA |
After an incident with a hot air balloon, Billy and Sanctifer find themselves atop a snowy mountain.
| 22 | 22 | "Gutbucket" | Stan Hey | TBA |
Billy intervenes at a zoo where a guard dog bullies the animals.
| 23 | 23 | "The Pigeon That Fell on the Earth" | Ian James Corlett and Terry Klassen | TBA |
After Jumbo's wing is injured, a kind man tends to him, but Sanctifur intends on ending the pigeon's life by eating him.
| 24 | 24 | "Curse of Catopatra" | Michael Benyaer | TBA |
An Egyptian cat plots revenge against Mr. Hubert whose ancestor locked her in a pyramid.
| 25 | 25 | "I'm Not an Animal" | Ian James Corlett and Terry Klassen | TBA |
Billy and Mr. Hubert thwart burglars who try to rob Billy's old house.
| 26 | 26 | "Billy's Last Chance" | Barry Whittaker and Judy Valyi | TBA |
Billy encounters the Magician who turned him into a cat, but has to come to the aid of a girl who was accidentally turned into a rabbit by the magician.

=== Season 2 ===
| No. overall | No. in season | Title | Written by | Original release date |
|---|---|---|---|---|
| 27 | 1 | "Fish Food" | Robin Lyons and Andrew Offiler | TBA |
Billy, Hubert and Queenie enjoy a day at the town aquarium, where Billy's class is having their field trip.
| 28 | 2 | "Brotherly Love" | Robin Lyons and Andrew Offiler | TBA |
A girl cat named Sabrina encounters Hubert and Billy and wants to locate a former member of a cat mafia who happens to be Hubert's older brother.
| 29 | 3 | "The Kitten That Roared" | Robin Lyons and Andrew Offiler | TBA |
Billy and Hubert have an adventure in Africa where they encounter a lion cub.
| 30 | 4 | "Robodog" | Fabrice Ziolkowski and Luli Barzman | TBA |
The Dead End Dogs use a scientist's robotic dog programmed to target cats.
| 31 | 5 | "Home Sweet Haunted Home" | Terry Klassen | TBA |
Billy, Hubert and Queenie encounter a kitten named Nelson whose owner thinks her house is haunted.
| 32 | 6 | "Airborne Hijinks" | Judy Valyi and Barry Whittaker | TBA |
Len and Des plot to steal charity money from an air show, but Billy and the others try to stop them.
| 33 | 7 | "A Cat Named Rex" | Fabrice Ziolkowski and Luli Barzman | TBA |
On a visit to an amusement park, Hubert is hypnotized into thinking he's a dog by a fortuneteller.
| 34 | 8 | "For Art's Sake" | Peter Hynes | TBA |
Billy, Hubert, and Jumbo run afoul of a magpie who is stealing rent money from a young artist.
| 35 | 9 | "Lights, Camera, Action" | Jono Howard | TBA |
Billy and Hubert assist an elephant in a movie filming.
| 36 | 10 | "Derby Billy" | Jono Howard | TBA |
The cats and dogs have a race in the city commemorating a historical event.
| 37 | 11 | "King of the Rats" | Terry Klassen | TBA |
A hamster, after hiding from some cats, is made leader of the sewer rats.
| 38 | 12 | "The Show Must Go On" | Peter Hynes | TBA |
Mr. Hubert hopes to participate at a show featuring feline performers.
| 39 | 13 | "Tuneless" | Michael Benyaer | TBA |
Billy and Mr. Hubert help a tone-deaf rooster find his place in the world.
| 40 | 14 | "Queenie's New Bow" | Judy Valyi | TBA |
Queenie gets a haircut after she feels her bow isn't enough to earn the respect of her peers, but she must also expose a stylist who steals jewelry from his clients.
| 41 | 15 | "Double Billy" | Norman Hudis | TBA |
Billy and Hubert encounter an elderly feline who thinks Billy is her long-lost boyfriend; however, her home is about to be demolished.
| 42 | 16 | "Happy Starday!" | Keith Brumpton | TBA |
During his birthday, Mr. Hubert goes to an observatory in hopes of being within the rays of a lucky star.
| 43 | 17 | "Running Wild" | Fabrice Ziolkowski | TBA |
Billy, Hubert and Sanctifur, after fighting in a train car, are forced to survive in the great outdoors, and escape an ill-tempered hunter.
| 44 | 18 | "Eau de Junkyard" | Catherine Girczyc | TBA |
Billy and the others try to keep a skunk and her children safe from an animal control worker.
| 45 | 19 | "Paws, Jaws and Claws" | Keith Brumpton | TBA |
Billy and the others encounter Queenie's Mother and Father, who are mystified by a giant clam attacking cats around a lighthouse.
| 46 | 20 | "From Whom the Bell Tolls" | Peter Hynes | TBA |
A clairvoyant bird predicts that Mr. Hubert will die, so Billy and the others try to prevent it.
| 47 | 21 | "Jumbo Flyer" | Barry Whittaker | TBA |
Jumbo falls in love with a girl pigeon as a race is about to start, but a man who hates birds intends to use a giant fan to disrupt the race.
| 48 | 22 | "Pride and Prejudice" | Stephen Desberg | TBA |
Billy, with the help of a canine, tries to stop an inventor who uses a musical device that makes cats behave like dogs.
| 49 | 23 | "The Amulet of Cerberus" | Barry Whittaker | TBA |
Billy and Mr. Hubert help a professor's cat kidnapped by an antiques collector, who intends to locate a magical amulet.
| 50 | 24 | "The Trouble with Bob" | Jill Brett | TBA |
Billy tries to reunite a St. Bernard dog with his owners, but, a crooked dog catcher and the Dead End Dogs won't make it easy.
| 51 | 25 | "The Invasion of the Cat Nappers" | Fabrice Ziolkowski | TBA |
Billy and the others investigate aliens in a warehouse, while they try to rescue Mr. Hubert.
| 52 | 26 | "Speak No Evil" | Fabrice Ziolkowski | 2001 |
A woman uses Billy and Sanctifur to steal secret codes from a top secret place to keep people from communicating with each other.

== TV movies ==
| Title | Directed by | Written by | Original release date |
|---|---|---|---|
| "One of the Guys" | Les Orton | Jono Howard, Terry Klassen, Robin Lyons, Malcolm McGookin, Andrew Offiler, Judy Valyi, and Barry Whittaker | 1998 |
Regales the chronicles of Billy trying to fit in with Blackie's gang, by entering the uptown dogs' territory and befriending a poodle, rescuing the kittens of a gang member's sister, and encountering the great purple nothing.
| "Cats Can Talk" | Jean Pierre Jacquet | Fabrice Ziolkowski, Luli Barzman, and Stephen Desberg | 2001 |
Regales the adventures of Billy about to be involved in a plot set by an evil woman.
