= Institutionalized riot systems =

Institutionalized riot systems (IRS) is a term invented by professor Paul Brass in 2004 in his book The Production of Hindu-Muslim Violence in Contemporary India with regards to Indian politics. This term describes the dramatic production of riots, which Brass has divided into three phases: preparation, activation and explanation.

Preparation: This phase is a continuous activity. The most important people in this phase are "fire tenders", who keep Hindu-Muslim tensions alive through various inflammatory and inciting acts.

Activation: This phase is a phase of violence. In this phase another group of people come forward, who lead and address mobs of potential rioters and give a signal to indicate if and when violence should start. These leaders are called "conversion specialists". They usually lead the mob of criminals from poor background, who were recruited and rewarded for practicing the violence.

Explanation: In this phase explanations for the cause of violence are controlled. Politicians and vernacular media plays a major role in this phase. Violence is presented as spontaneous, religious, mass-based, unpredictable and impossible to prevent. Social scientists start the process of blame displacement to save those who are most responsible for the production of violence, and instead diffuses blame widely. This contributes to the perpetuation of violent productions in future, as well as the order that sustains them.

Brass explains that it is because of this system that Hindu-Muslim riots in India often turned into pogroms and massacres of Muslims, in which few Hindus are killed. Most often, the principal beneficiaries of this process are the government and its political leaders.
