= Iridium (disambiguation) =

Iridium is a chemical element with symbol Ir and atomic number 77.

Iridium may also refer to:

- Iridium satellite constellation, a satellite group providing voice and data coverage
  - Iridium Communications, the company operating the Iridium satellite constellation
- Iridium Jazz Club, in New York City
- Iridium High, a fictional high school in the television series Every Witch Way

== See also ==
- Isotopes of iridium
  - Iridium-192, an isotope
- Iridium flare, a notable source of satellite glint
- Iridium anomaly, an unusual abundance of the element in a layer of rock strata
- Ir (disambiguation)
- Iris (disambiguation)
