= Single-cable distribution =

Satellite TV technology

Unicable

Single-cable distribution is a satellite TV technology that enables the delivery of broadcast programming to multiple users over a single coaxial cable, and eliminates the numerous cables required to support consumer electronics devices such as twin-tuner digital video recorders (DVRs) and high-end receivers.

Without single-cable distribution, providing full-spectrum access for multiple receivers, or receivers with multiple tuners, in a single-family home has required a separate coaxial cable feeding each tuner from the antenna equipment (either multiple LNBs, a multi-output LNB or a multiswitch distribution system) because of the large bandwidth requirement of the signals.

Single-cable distribution technology enables one coaxial cable from the antenna equipment to multiple tuners, to provide independent tuning across the whole range of satellite reception for each tuner.

A European industry standard for distributing satellite signals over a single coaxial cable - CENELEC EN50494 - was defined in 2007 and developed by a consortium led by SES.

Single-cable distribution technology can be found in commercial equipment with the Unicable trademark from FTA Communications Technologies. Unicable uses an integrated software and hardware solution that allows Unicable-certified DVRs and receivers to multiplex selected programming when using Unicable LNB or multiswitching products.

The Unicable Interoperability Platform is open to companies designing and/or marketing satellite and other broadcast-related products. The platform is designed to facilitate the acceptance of Unicable-certified solutions in the consumer TV broadcast market.

== How it works ==
Each satellite receiver in the installation has a dedicated user band of a bandwidth approximately the same as a transponder. The receiver requests a particular transponder frequency via a DiSEqC-compliant command. A mixer in the dish-end equipment (an LNB or distribution unit) converts the received signal to the correct user band IF centre frequency for that receiver.

The converted transponders of the various users are then combined, and sent via the single coaxial cable to the receivers. The combined signal is tapped or split to reach every user.

Silicon vendors have developed complex integrated circuits that greatly reduce the cost of implementing the single-cable distribution function. A channel-stacking switch IC is a multiple-input multiple-output device. It typically has N 1.2 GHz inputs that can be cascaded to additional chips as required (to expand output capacity). These inputs are fed into a large N-pole M-Throw switch that outputs to M mixers. Each mixer path then translates only the user requested transponder to a predetermined fixed frequency within the 950-2150 MHz band. This fixed frequency is unique for each tuner on the single cable output. Each tuner in the STB always stays at this fixed frequency while the CSS IC translates the user requested content down the cable to this exact frequency. This architecture requires no hardware change to the STB design. Communications protocol between the CSS IC and the STB is handled via the CENELEC EN50494 standard or proprietary systems.

== Equipment ==
Special LNBs have been developed for use in single-cable distribution systems. All four sub-bands of the Ku band (low frequency/horizontal polarity, high frequency/horizontal polarity, low frequency/vertical polarity, high frequency/vertical polarity) are received by a conventional front end, amplified and downconverted to the L-band, to be fed to a number of SatCR (Satellite Channel Router) – one for each user that can be connected - to further downconvert the required section of the received spectrum to centre on the user band IF frequency. The LNB further includes a combiner (i.e. reverse splitter) to merge the user bands and a microcontroller to receive the instructions as to which frequency is required by each user and control the SatCR chips.

Alternatively, a single-cable distribution system can use a conventional LNB feeding the four sub-bands to separate SatCR receivers, as a substitute for a traditional multiswitch, that needs a dedicated coaxial cable for every receiver (or tuner) connected.

Unicable LNBs and SatCRs also usually include either a legacy mode of operation or a legacy output which provides conventional LNB IF for use with an installation of non-Unicable receivers.

A receiver required to operate in a single-cable distribution installation can be essentially conventional. It should be able to tune to the user channel (within the normal IF tuning range) and modulate the LNB power voltage with the 22 kHz signal required for issuing DiSEqC commands. It will then require only software modification to operate as a single-cable distribution receiver.

For correct operation, two-way splitters are required to feed the combined signal to each receiver. These allow bi-directional passage of both RF and DC signals, to provide for the passing of DiSEqC commands between the LNB and receiver(s).

As of March 2010, SES' Single Cable Distribution factsheet lists 88 receivers as supporting single-cable distribution technology although this list is not exhaustive. Several receivers for the HD+ German high definition platform broadcast from Astra 19.2°E are compatible with the SatCR system.

== Use in legacy communal TV systems ==
Existing communal integrated reception systems (IRS) often provide only one satellite feed to each household, preventing the use of dual-tuner DVRs. Upgrading the multiswitches and cabling to provide two or more feeds per household is usually both costly and invasive. However, individual households or sections of the system can be converted to SatCR distribution so that multiple tuners within a household can be fed via the single existing coaxial cable.

Equipment such as Inverto's Unicable Cascadable Switch can be connected to a conventional quattro LNB to provide a single SatCR output and a conventional LNB output. The four IF inputs from the Quattro LNB are looped through to outputs so the unit can be cascaded to further SatCR switches or to the existing multiswitches of the IRS, so an SatCR-enabled output is provided without replacing the existing LNB or affecting the provision for conventional receivers in other households served by the rest of the system.

Versions of the Unicable Switch to provide for four and eight tuners within a household are available, and to combine a digital terrestrial signal onto the SatCR-enabled output as well.

Global Invacom's SatCR Adaptor unit performs a similar function but is connected to the existing multiswitch outputs, to provide SatCR compatibility for one connection (one household) of an existing IRS.

The SatCR Adaptor connects to four outputs of an IRS multiswitch and provides a single SatCR output that is typically connected to the existing single coaxial cable to the household to be converted. A further four conventional IF outputs are provided to recover usage of the existing multiswitch outputs for other households. Within the SatCR enabled household, a splitter and power injector provides power to the SatCR Adaptor and splits the signal to feed the separate tuners connected.

Global Invacom developed the SatCR Adaptor in conjunction with BSkyB to enable flats and homes with single-feed distribution systems to fit Sky+ and Sky+ HD dual-tuner DVR receivers. While BSkyB SCR is slightly different to the CENELEC EN50494 standard most European SCR compatible multiswitches support both standard and BSkyB modes. Most Sky branded receivers including the Sky Q model can be used on SatCR systems by enabling a hidden option. Sky Italia receivers comply with the unicable standard.

== Fibre-optic alternative ==
An alternative approach to that provided by single-cable distribution of the signal from a single LNB to multiple receivers, or receivers with multiple tuners, is offered by the use of fibre satellite distribution using optical fibre. The high bandwidth of optical connections allows for the full satellite spectrum received at the dish to be accommodated on one fibre optic cable, which can be easily optically split to provide that full spectrum signal to a large number of receivers.

UK company Global Invacom (which also developed and markets SatCR single-cable distribution equipment) has developed a low cost system of fibre optic distribution suitable for domestic installations and small or medium commercial communal dish systems, with an optical output LNB, fibre cables, splitters, and converter units to return the optical signal to an electrical one compatible with legacy receivers.

The extremely low signal loss through fibre optic cables and complete elimination of interference and noise picked up by the cable mean that such a system can support very long cable runs between the dish and the converters in a widespread communal dish system, and a smaller dish can be used as the communal antenna.

Global Invacom won the Astra Innovation Contest run by satellite operator SES in 2007 for the proposal and initial development of optical fibre distribution systems for satellite TV.

== See also ==
- Low-noise block downconverter
- Fibre satellite distribution
- SES
- Satellite television
- Satellite dish
- Microwave antenna
