= Renaud Denauw =

Belgian comic book artist

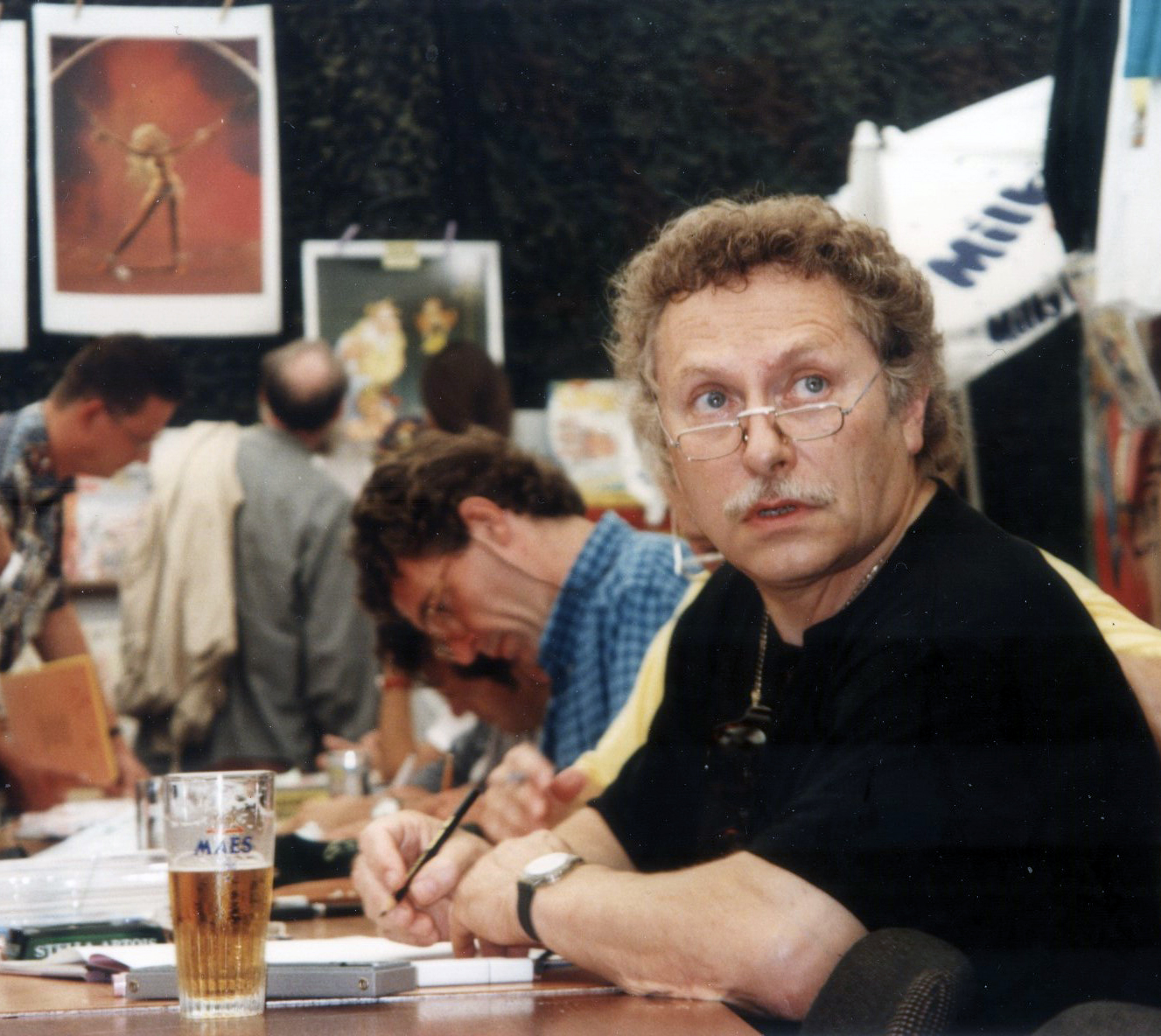
- Renaud Denauw, 1995
- Born: 28 November 1936 (age 89); Mouscron, Belgium
- Other name: Renaud
- Occupation: comic book artist

Renaud Denauw (born 28 November 1936 in Mouscron), also known as "Renaud", is a Belgian comic book artist. He is best known for his collaboration with writer Jean Dufaux in the Jessica Blandy comic book.

== Professional biography ==
Renaud was hired for Spirou magazine in 1975 as an illustrator. Quickly developing a reputation for drawing sensual women (such as the eponymous heroine in "Aymone" from 1975 to 1977), he also used the pseudonym "Sylvain" to draw the adult comic "Merline". After a stint drawing funny stories aimed at children ("Myrtille, Vidpoche et Cabochard", 1978), he moved over to rival comic book publishing house Tintin magazine in 1981 and illustrated "Platon, Torloche et Coquinette", another children's series. After drawing caricatured characters for a longer period, Renaud refined his depiction of realistic personages, and finally was chosen to collaborate with Belgian colleague Jean Dufaux on the new Jessica Blandy comic book in 1987. The series, centered on the eponymous, sexy-but-innerly-broken femme fatale was successful, and Dufaux and Renaud are still collaborating after 24 issues. Other works by Renaud include Les Enfants de la Salamandre from 1988 to 1990, Santiag in 1991, and Venus H. in 2005, all with Dufaux.
