= My New Life as a Cat =

Japanese manga series

- First tankōbon volume cover

ねこ、はじめました〜ニャンとも気になるニャオ〜 (Neko, Hajimemashita: Nyantomo Ki ni Naru Nyao)
- Genre: Romantic comedy; Slice of life
- Manga
- Written by: Konomi Wagata
- Published by: Shogakukan
- English publisher: NA: Seven Seas Entertainment
- Imprint: Ciao Comics
- Magazine: Ciao
- Original run: October 3, 2015 – present
- Volumes: 15

My New Life as a Cat (Japanese: ねこ、はじめました〜ニャンとも気になるニャオ〜, Hepburn: Neko, Hajimemashita: Nyantomo Ki ni Naru Nyao) is a Japanese manga series written and illustrated by Konomi Wagata. It began serialization in Shogakukan's Ciao magazine in October 2015. It is licensed in English by Seven Seas Entertainment. In 2020, it won the Shogakukan Manga Award for Children's manga.

== Plot ==
The manga focuses on Nao Kazushiro, a carefree high school boy who fell into a coma after a traffic accident and finds himself residing in the body of a cat named Nyao. He ends up being picked up off the streets by a classmate, a girl named Chika.

== Characters ==
Nao Kazushiro (かずしろなお, Kazushiro Nao) / Nyao (ニャオ)
Voiced by: Yuma Uchida (voice comic)
Chika (チカ)
Voiced by: Haruno Inoue (voice comic)

== Publication ==
Written and illustrated by Konomi Wagata, My New Life as a Cat began serialization in Shogakukan's Ciao magazine on October 3, 2015. It has been collected in fifteen volumes as of March 2026. The manga is licensed in English by Seven Seas Entertainment.

=== Volumes ===
No.	Original release date	Original ISBN	English release date	English ISBN
1	July 22, 2016	978-4-09-138617-5	April 11, 2023	978-1-68579-721-8
Chapters 1–10; Special chapter: "A Day in Nyao's Life"
2	March 31, 2017	978-4-09-139194-0	July 11, 2023	978-1-68579-722-5
Chapters 11–25; Special chapter: "Find the Button!"; Nyao's Friend Contest
3	November 29, 2017	978-4-09-139598-6	October 10, 2023	978-1-68579-723-2
Chapters 26–40; Special chapter: "My Charm Points"; Nyao's Friend Contest
4	June 29, 2018	978-4-09-870187-2	January 9, 2024	978-1-68579-963-2
Chapters 41–56; Special chapter: "Do I Smell Good?"
5	January 30, 2019	978-4-09-870325-8	April 16, 2024	979-8-88843-159-7
Chapters 57–71
6	October 1, 2019	978-4-09-870642-6	July 2, 2024	979-8-88843-160-3
Chapters 72–83; Special chapter: "What's in a Name"; Special chapter: "The One I Look Up to"
7	April 30, 2020	978-4-09-871031-7	October 15, 2024	979-8-89160-034-8
Chapters 84–95
8	November 27, 2020	978-4-09-871180-2	January 14, 2025	979-8-89160-194-9
Chapters 96–108
9	November 26, 2021	978-4-09-871553-4	April 22, 2025	979-8-89160-546-6
Chapters 109–121
10	June 24, 2022	978-4-09-871746-0	July 8, 2025	979-8-89373-003-6
Chapters 122–134; Special chapter: "As a Cat? As a Human?"
11	March 24, 2023	978-4-09-872016-3	October 21, 2025	979-8-89373-122-4
Chapters 135–146; Special chapter: "Which One Is My Snack?!"
12	November 24, 2023	978-4-09-872429-1	January 20, 2026	979-8-89373-123-1
Chapters 147–158
13	June 26, 2024	978-4-09-872575-5	April 21, 2026	979-8-89373-699-1
Chapters 159–169
14	April 25, 2025	978-4-09-873075-9	July 28, 2026	979-8-89765-281-5
Chapters 170–181; Special chapter: "What Kinda Cat?"
15	March 26, 2026	978-4-09-873377-4	March 16, 2027	979-8-89863-214-4

== Reception ==
In 2020, the manga won the 65th Shogakukan Manga Award in the Children's manga category.

== See also ==
- Billy the Cat - Belgian bande dessinée based on similar premise
