= Le Scorpion =

Comic book series

- Cover to Le Scorpion Tome 7 '. Art by Enrico Marini.
- Publisher: Dargaud (French); Cinebook Ltd (English)

Creative team
- Writer: Desberg Desberg
- Artist: Enrico Marini

Le Scorpion is a Franco-Belgian comics series written by Stephen Desberg, illustrated by Enrico Marini and published by Dargaud in French and Dutch, and by Cinebook in English.

== Summary ==
The story takes place in Rome during the second half of the eighteenth century. Cardinal Trebaldi decides to reinstate the power of the nine families, based on papacy. Armando Catalano, also known as The Scorpion, is a holy relics dealer. He is the son of a heretic who was burnt alive for misdirecting a priest from the church and Christian beliefs. Armando, the bearer of a birthmark in the shape of a scorpion known as the "mark of the devil", challenges the cardinal's authority. The cardinal, who seems to be filled with hatred for The Scorpion, sends the young gypsy Mejai, a specialist in poisons, to kill him.

The adventures of the Scorpion lead him to the treasure of the Templars and to discover an interpretation of what might have happened to it. Between fiction and history, this comic distills Machiavellian theory on religious authority.

== Albums ==
These albums are published by Dargaud:

1. La marque du diable - October 2000
2. Le secret du Pape - October 2001
3. La croix de Pierre - November 2002
4. Le Démon au Vatican - April 2004
5. La vallée sacrée - November 2004
6. Le trésor du Temple - October 2005
7. Au Nom du Père - November 2006
8. L'ombre de l'Ange - November 2008
9. Masque de la Vérité - August 2010
10. Au Nom du Fils - November 2012
11. La neuvième famille - November 2014
12. Le Mauvais Augure - November 2019
13. Tamose l’égyptien - November 2020
14. La Tombe d'un dieu - May 2022

== English Translation ==
Since August 2008, Cinebook Ltd has been publishing The Scorpion. Eight trade paperbacks have been released, although note that the first two correspond to two each of the French albums.

1. The Devil's Mark (includes The Pope's Secret) ISBN 978-1-905460-62-5 - August 2008
2. The Devil in the Vatican (includes The Stone Cross) ISBN 978-1-905460-90-8 - May 2009
3. The Holy Valley ISBN 978-1-84918-029-0 - April 2010
4. The Treasure of the Templars ISBN 978-1-84918-046-7 - August 2010
5. In the Name of the Father ISBN 978-1-84918-122-8 - May 2012
6. The Angel's Shadow ISBN 978-1-84918-153-2 - August 2013
7. The Mask of Truth ISBN 978-1-84918-176-1 - November 2013
8. In the Name of the Son ISBN 978-1-84918-199-0 - June 2014
