= Béatrice Tillier =

French illustrator and bande dessinée cartoonist (born 1972)

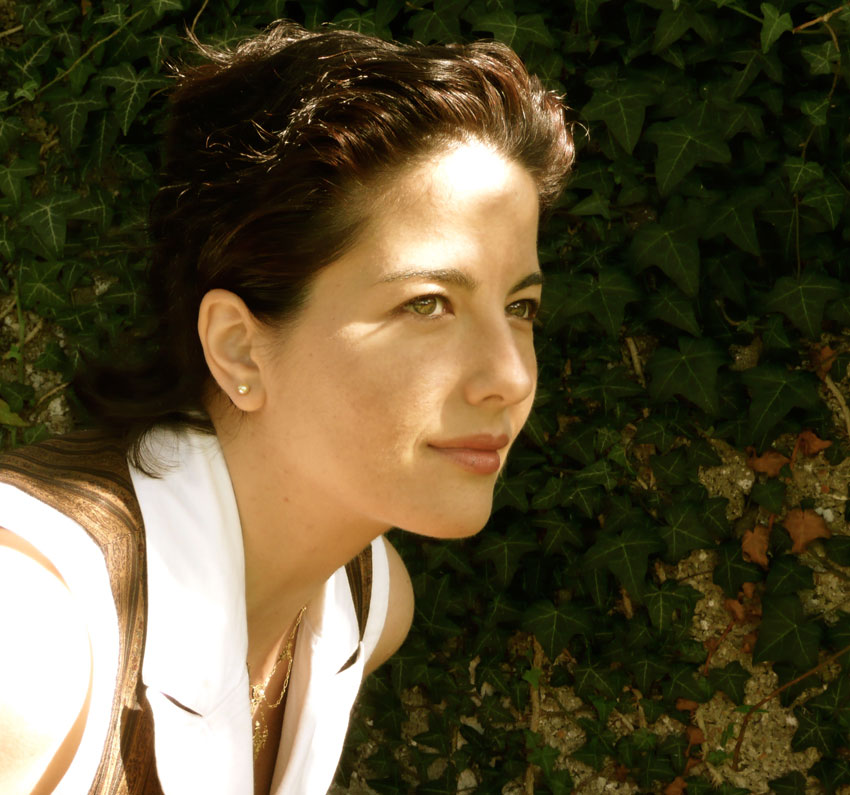
- Tillier in 2007
- Born: September 18, 1972 (age 54) Lyon, France
- Areas: Cartoonist, Artist, Colourist
- Notable works: Le Bois des Vierges
- Spouse: Olivier Brazao

Béatrice Tillier (born 18 September 1972) is a French illustrator and bande dessinée (BD) cartoonist. In 2008, Le Bois des Vierges was shortlisted for the Prix Saint-Michel's Best comic (French language).

== Biography ==
Béatrice Tillier was born in Lyon, France, 18 September 1972.

She studied literature before graduating from the École Émile-Cohl in Lyon, where she met her husband, Olivier Brazao.

After collaborating with several publishers, mostly to illustrate children's stories, Tillier published her first comics series with Téhy with Vents d'Ouest, Fée et tendres automate, a science fiction comics in three volumes between 1996 and 2003.

Later, living in Pas-de-Calais, she works with her husband and Thomas Mosdi on the series Sheewõwkees (Delcourt), published between 2003 and 2009 in three volumes. The reception on BD Gest' is poor, but more positive on "Planète BD". In 2005, with Philippe Bonifay as scriptwriter, Mon voisin le Père Noël (My neighbor Santa Claus) was published, and was very well received on BD Gest'. From 2008, with Jean Dufaux as scriptwriter, Tillier signs the fantastic triptych Le Bois des Vierges, Still with Dufaux, from 2015, Tillier draws the third cycle of Complainte des landes perdues (Dargaud): Tête noire (2015), followed by Inferno (2019). In addition, Tillier participates in several collective works, such as Souvenirs de films in 2009.

== Main comics publications ==
Tillier's universe is populated with fantastic creatures beginning with her first comic in the 1990s, Fée et tendres automates. The album is well received and is the recipient of several prizes at BD festivals including: best album at Festival international de la bande dessinée de Chambéry, Prix de la Ville de Sérignan, and Prize Infonie among others). This positions Tillier to be selected for the Alph-Art coup de cœur of the Angoulême Festival. A few years later, she drew the second volume, but it was Frank Leclercq who drew the third volume. The years in the 2000 decade are marked in particular by her participation in the coloring of the albums Sheewōwkees, a series of heroic fantasy where the drawings are by her husband, Olivier Brazao. She also draws Mon voisin le Père Noël. Then with Jean Dufaux as the scriptwriter, she begins the series Le Bois des Vierges. The other albums of this series are published in the years 2010, during which, with the same scriptwriter, she also devotes herself to a new cycle of comics, Complainte des moes perdues.

== Selected works ==
- Series, Fée et tendres automates:
  1. Jam, 1996
  2. Elle, 2000
- Sheewōwkees, 3 volumes, 2003–09, colorist
- Mon voisin le Père Noël, 2005
- La Compagnie des glaces, storyboard and covers, 5 volumes, 2005–09
- Series, Le Bois des Vierges:
  1. Le Bois des Vierges, 2008
  2. Loup, 2010
  3. Épousailles 2013
- Complainte des landes perdues, scriptwriting by Jean Dufaux:
  1. Tête noire, 2015
  2. Inferno, 2019
