= Enrico Marini =

Italian-Swiss comics artist

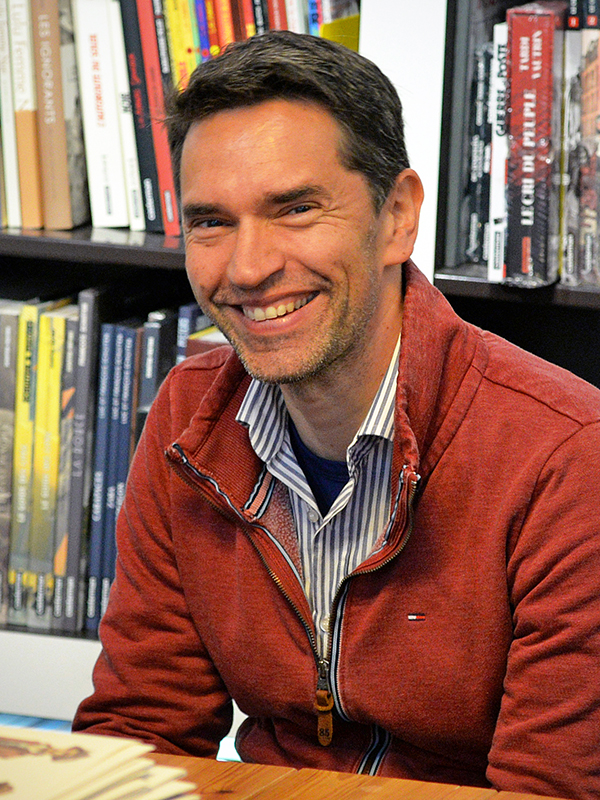
- Marini in 2014
- Born: 13 August 1969 (age 57) Switzerland
- Areas: Writer, Penciller, Artist, Inker, Letterer, Colourist
- Notable works: Gipsy; Le Scorpion Les Aigles de Rome

Enrico Marini (born 13 August 1969) is a Swiss-born Italian comics artist.

His works include Gipsy with writer Thierry Smolderen and Le Scorpion with writer Stephen Desberg.

== Biography ==
Marini was born in (Switzerland) and studied graphic arts in the School of Fine Arts of Basel.

His career started at the 1987 Festival de la Bande Dessinée in Sierre.

Since 2007, Marini has been a fully-fledged writer, with works such as Les Aigles de Rome (The Eagles of Rome) and Batman: The Dark Prince in 2017.

== Publications ==
=== Les dossiers d'Olivier Varèse ===
Published by Alpen Publishers

- 1990 : T.1 La Colombe de la place Rouge, written by Marelle
- 1992 : T.2 Bienvenue à Kokonino World, written by Thierry Smolderen
- 1992 : T.3 Raid sur Kokonino World, written by Thierry Smolderen
- 1993 : T.4 Le Parfum du magnolia, written by Georges Pop

=== Gipsy ===
Written by Thierry Smolderen

- 1993 : T.1 L'Étoile du Gitan, éd. Alpen Publishers
- 1994 : T.2 Les Feux de Sibérie, éd. Les Humanoïdes Associés
- 1995 : T.3 Le Jour du Tsar, éd. Les Humanoïdes Associés
- 1997 : T.4 Les Yeux noirs, éd. Dargaud
- 1999 : T.5 L'Aile blanche, éd. Dargaud
- 2002 : T.6 Le Rire Aztèque, éd. Dargaud

=== L'Étoile du désert ===
Written by Stephen Desberg, published by Dargaud

- 1996 : L'Étoile du désert T.1
- 1996 : L'Étoile du désert T.2
- 1999 : Carnet de Croquis

=== Les Héritiers du Serpent ===
- 1998 : Les Héritiers du Serpent, written by Exem, éd. Suzanne Hurter

=== Rapaces ===
Written by Jean Dufaux, published by Dargaud

- 1998 : Rapaces 1
- 2000 : Rapaces 2
- 2001 : Rapaces 3
- 2003 : Rapaces 4

=== Le Scorpion ===
Written by Stephen Desberg, published by Dargaud

- 2000 : T.1 La Marque du diable
- 2001 : T.2 Le Secret du Pape
- 2002 : T.3 La Croix de Pierre
- 2004 : T.4 Le Démon au Vatican
- 2004 : T.5 La Vallée sacrée
- 2005 : T.6 Le Trésor du Temple
- 2006 : T.7 Au Nom du Père
- 2007 : H.S. Le Procès scorpion
- 2008 : T.8 L'Ombre de l'ange
- 2010 : T.9 Le Masque de la vérité
- 2012 : T.10 Au nom du fils
- 2013 : Integral in two volumes (Tomes 1 to 5 and 6 to 10)
- 2014 : T.11 La Neuvième Famille
- 2019 : T.12 "Le Mauvais Augure"

=== Les Aigles de Rome ===
Published by Dargaud

- 2007: T.1 Livre I
- 2009: T.2 Livre II
- 2011: T.3 Livre III
- 2013: T.4 Livre IV
- 2016: T.5 Livre V
- 2023: T.6 Livre VI
- 2025: T.7 Livre VII

=== Batman ===
Published by DC Comics/Dargaud

- 2017 : T.1 Dark Prince Charming
- 2018 : T.2 Dark Prince Charming
