= Viviane Nicaise =

Belgian cartoonist (born 1952)

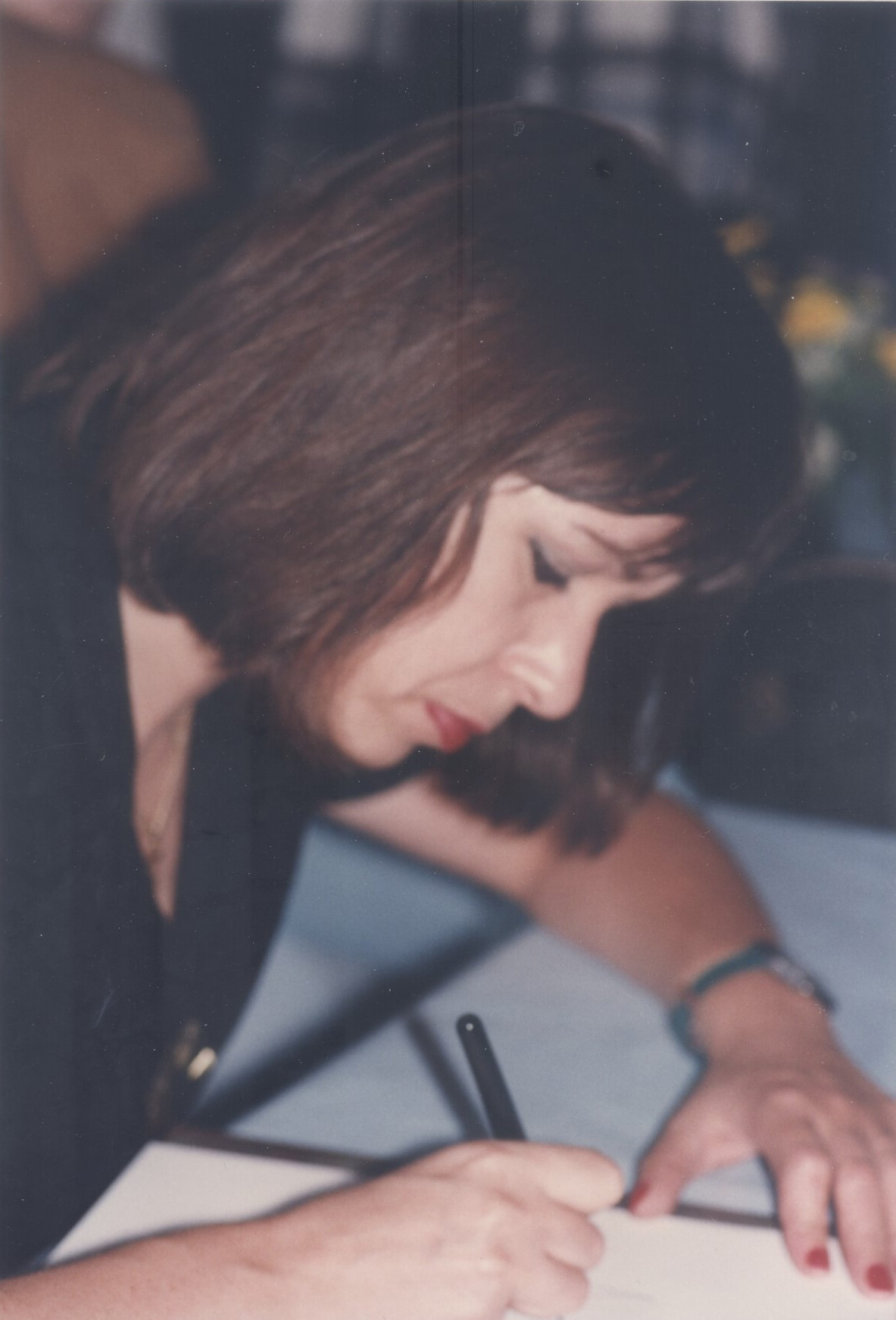
- Born: 1952 (age 73–74) Tournai, Belgium
- Areas: Cartoonist, Colourist
- Notable works: La Vie en rose Sang-De-Lune
- Collaborators: Dieter

Signature
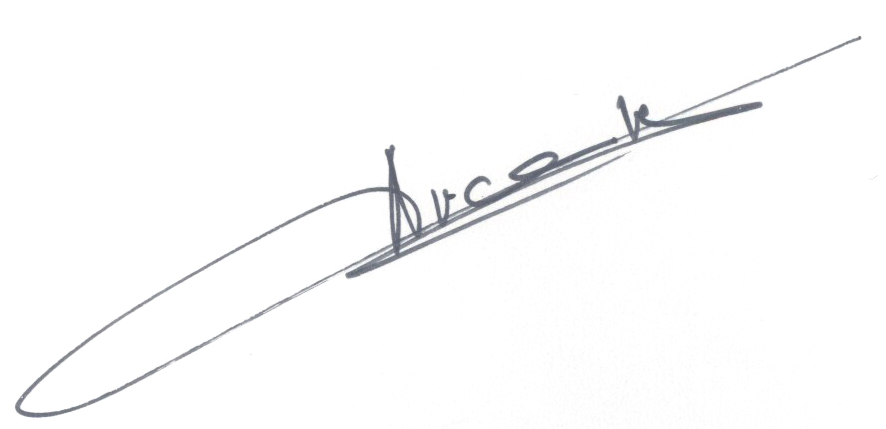

Viviane Nicaise (born 1952, Tournai), is a Belgian bande dessinée cartoonist and colorist.

== Early life and education ==
Viviane Nicaise was born in Tournai in 1952. She studied social sciences at the Institut Supérieur des hautes études sociales de l'État in Brussels and spent fifteen years working in an aftercare home for mentally ill young adults as a social worker, while giving dance and tap dancing lessons in various schools in Belgium.

At the age of 37, Nicaise discovered the pleasure of drawing as a complete autodidact and participated in a comic strip contest. She then enrolled in evening classes at the academy of Saint-Gilles and finally at the Académie Royale des Beaux-Arts in Brussels where she lives.

== Career ==
With Jean Dufaux in the scenario, she drew the fantasy series Sang-De-Lune in 6 albums with Glénat Editions in the collection "Grafica" from 1992 to 1996. Then, she joined the scriptwriter, Dieter and launched the series Loranne. She also reconstructed the lost America of the 1960s, with the same publisher in the same collection (3 albums, 1998–2000). Continuing with Dieter as scriptwriter, Nicaise developed the thriller 6 jours et mourir in two albums published the same year in 2001 for the collection "Bulle noire".

La Vie en rose is a detective story by Dieter (scriptwriter) and Nicaise, in three volumes, published by Glénat in the collection "Bulle noire" from 2003 to 2004. Nicaise promoted scientific training in an educational comic strip, Objectif sciences for the Île-de-France region in 2007. She turned to the fantasy genre for the diptych Post Mortem scripted by Romuald Pistis in the collection "HZ-Horizon" at Joker Éditions (2009–2010). For the collection "Grand Angle" of Bamboo Édition, Nicaise drew a new diptych, Le Cahier à fleurs, scripted by Laurent Galandon which described the Armenian genocide through the view of young orphans in 2010 and 2011. In an interview with Jean-Jacques Procureur, Nicaise declared that she had lived in Greece and was still there in December 2011.

Her next interest, Une tragédie grecque, was a sentimental unraveling and the saga of Aristotle Onassis with a scenario by Jean-Claude Bartoll in two albums with the same publisher (2012–13). She returned to educational comics with two publications at Bardet Souchard in the collection "Narratives" dated March 2013. For Deadpool, she participated in a comic book at Hachette in 2019. At the same time, Nicaise exercised her talents as a colorist for Jacky Goupil in Le Guide junior de la rigolade with Vents d'Ouest Éditions in 2012 as well as for the series Scènes de ménage by Jif and Éric Miller with Éditions Jungle for volumes 2 and 4 from 2012 to 2013.

== Selected works (Bande dessinée albums) ==
=== As designer ===
- Loranne (completed series)
1. Clover (scriptwriter, Dieter; designer, Viviane Nicaise; colorist, Bertrand Denoulet), September 1998, Glénat, Coll. Grafica, Grenoble ISBN 2-7234-2577-0
2. California dream, D(scriptwriter, Dieter; designer, Viviane Nicaise; colorist, Bertrand Denoulet), November 1999, Glénat, Coll. Grafica, Grenoble ISBN 2-7234-2838-9
3. Frisco, (scriptwriter, Dieter; designer, Viviane Nicaise; colorist, Bertrand Denoulet), May 2000, Glénat, Coll. Grafica, Grenoble ISBN 2-7234-3108-8
- Sang-De-Lune (completed series) (scriptwriter, Jean Dufaux)
1. Sang-De-Lune, Glénat, Coll. Grafica, 1992 ISBN 2-7234-1462-0
2. Sang-Marelle, Glénat, Coll. Grafica, 1993 ISBN 2-7234-1678-X
3. Sang-Désir, Glénat, Coll. Grafica, 1994 ISBN 2-7234-1717-4
4. Rouge-Vent, Glénat, Coll. Grafica, 1995 ISBN 2-7234-1894-4
5. Sang-Délire, Glénat, Coll. Grafica, 1996 ISBN 2-7234-2135-X
6. Lise et le Boucher, Glénat, Coll. Grafica, 1997 ISBN 2-7234-2267-4
- 6 Jours et mourir (completed series)
1. Tea time (scriptwriter, Dieter), Glénat, Coll. Bulle Noire, 2001 ISBN 2-7234-3302-1
2. Présumée coupable (scriptwriter, Dieter), Glénat, Coll. Bulle Noire, 2001 ISBN 2-7234-3499-0
- La Vie en rose (completed series) (scriptwriter, Dieter)
1. Frelons, Glénat, Coll. Bulle Noire, 2003 ISBN 2-7234-3716-7
2. Cap Gris-nez, Glénat, Coll. Bulle Noire, 2003 ISBN 2-7234-3984-4
3. La Dernière Pluie, Glénat, Coll. Bulle Noire, 2004 ISBN 2-7234-4192-X
- Post Mortem (completed series)
1. Les Sœurs de Babel (scriptwriter, Romuald Pistis), Éditions Joker, Coll. Hz, 2009 ISBN 978-2-87265-421-5
2. Aula magna (scriptwriter, Romuald Pistis), Joker, Coll. Hz, 2010 ISBN 978-2-87265-464-2
- Le Cahier à fleurs (completed series)
1. Mauvaise orchestration (scriptwriter, Laurent Galandon), Bamboo Édition, Coll. Grand Angle, 2010 ISBN 978-2-350-78889-0
2. Dernière mesure, (scriptwriter, Laurent Galandon), Bamboo Édition, Coll. Grand Angle, 2011 ISBN 978-2-8189-0316-2
- Une tragédie grecque (completed series)
1. Deux sœurs (scriptwriter, Jean-Claude Bartoll), Bamboo, Coll. Grand Angle, 2012 ISBN 978-2-8189-0847-1
2. Trois Mariages et deux enterrements (scriptwriter, Jean-Claude Bartoll), Bamboo, Coll. Grand Angle, 2013 ISBN 978-2-8189--0984-3

=== As colorist ===
- Scènes de ménages (completed series)
  - Vol. 2, Les Délices de l'amour, Jif (scriptwriter, Éric Miller; designer, Viviane Nicaise), 17 May 2012, Éditions Jungle, Coll. C'est à la télé, Paris ISBN 978-2-87442-971-2
  - Vol. 4, Encore plus terrible !, Jif (scriptwriter, Éric Miller; designer, Viviane Nicaise), 22 May 2013, Jungle, Coll. C'est à la télé, Paris ISBN 978-2-8222-0273-2
