= Jessica Blandy =

- Cover of Volume 11, Troubles aux Paradis

Publication information
- Publisher: Dupuis
- Format: Ongoing graphic novel series
- Publication date: 1987-present
- No. of issues: 24 volumes

Creative team
- Written by: Jean Dufaux
- Artist: Renaud

Jessica Blandy is a Belgian comic book series, started in 1987 by Belgian artists Renaud and Jean Dufaux. It is published by the Belgian Dupuis comic book publishing house. It follows the adventures of the eponymous heroine Jessica Blandy, a blonde femme fatale from California who works as a journalist. She is haunted by a traumatic past, which has made her an alcoholic.

Until now, 24 issues of this comic book have been published. In those episodes, Renaud and Dufaux pit Blandy against "all degenerates of the U.S. society": corrupt politicians, serial killers, worshippers of Satan and many more. The series features a mature slant, with a liberal amount of violence and murders, and scenes in which the highly attractive and bisexual Blandy engages in (off-page) sexual activity, but also is several times subject to (off-page) sexual violence — which usually involves the perpetrator getting killed in the course of the story, either by the heroine herself or by a friend. But in spite of this, the series is renowned for its level of psychological depth.
