= Batman: The Dark Prince Charming =

2017–18 graphic novel series

- Main characters: Batman; Joker; Alina Shelley; Catwoman; Harley Quinn
- Publisher: DC Comics

Original publication
- Date of publication: 2017; 2018
- Language: English

Batman: The Dark Prince Charming is an original two-volume graphic novel series from American comic book publisher DC Comics and French publisher Dargaud, featuring the DC Universe character Batman. The first volume was released on November 1, 2017, followed by the second volume on June 20, 2018. It was written, illustrated, and painted by Italian artist Enrico Marini and is his first major American publication. In The Dark Prince Charming, Batman pursues the Joker and Harley Quinn, who have kidnapped a child whose mother claims her to be the daughter of Bruce Wayne. The series is considered a standalone, out-of-continuity story.

== Plot ==
=== Book 1 ===
In a flash-forward scene, Bruce Wayne receives a gift-wrapped box. Some time before, in downtown Gotham City, the Joker and his gang flee a successful jewelry heist, pursued by Batman and his lover/casual adversary Catwoman. The Joker loses the pearls intended as a birthday present for Harley Quinn after jumping off a bridge. Angry at her disappointment, the Joker kills his entire gang except for a suicidal clown named Archie, whom Joker hires to find new recruits. Harley shows enthusiastic interest in a valuable diamond called the "Blue Cat". Bruce Wayne receives a paternity suit from Mariah Shelley, an alleged one-night-stand of Wayne's who claims that Wayne is the father of her highly-intelligent 8-year-old daughter Alina. The Joker hospitalizes Mariah in a car crash and kidnaps Alina, attempting to gain ransom to buy the "Blue Cat" for Harley. The Joker attempts to befriend Alina in his own psychotic way, comparing her plight to that of a princess in a fairy tale. Batman learns the results of a DNA test to figure out if he is indeed Alina's biological father, though the result is left unknown to the reader. He ruthlessly interrogates known associates of the Joker, including Killer Croc, but fails to gain any new intelligence. Part 1 ends with Alina desperately hoping Batman saves her while the Joker prepares for the inevitable confrontation.

=== Book 2 ===
In a flashback to nine years before, Bruce Wayne meets Mariah Shelley in the bar where she tends and the two flirt. In present time, Bruce is still interrogating former associates of the Joker with no results. Bruce receives a letter from the Joker, asking him to meet him at the bar where he first met Mariah. The Joker appears disguised as a prostitute and, unaware that Bruce and Batman are the same person, blackmails Bruce into bidding in an auction of the Blue Cat diamond in exchange for Alina's life. Bruce places a tracking device on the Joker without his knowledge. Both Bruce and Selina Kyle attend the auction but are both outbid by a wealthy Sheikh. Selina causes a diversion and discreetly steals the diamond. Batman encounters her in her Catwoman persona in Gotham and the two fight for the diamond before Batman leaves with it. The Joker's new recruits - all international mercenaries - arrive at his hideout in the abandoned Wayne Power Station. Batman uses his detective skills to locate the Joker and he effortlessly takes down the mercenaries. Harley Quinn acquires the Blue Cat but refuses to let the Joker kill Alina, as per their agreement to kill no children. The Joker then turns the gun on Harley but she is saved by Catwoman, who takes the Blue Cat for herself. Alina uses one of the Joker's jokes on himself - a hand-buzzer which injects him with a deadly poison. Alina throws the antidote out of a window and the Joker recklessly jumps through into the river below. Batman reluctantly allows Catwoman to leave with the diamond and takes Alina home. Bruce Wayne adopts Alina while her mother remains comatose. Jim Gordon informs Bruce that Quinn and Archie have disappeared, and the Joker is still missing. The following Christmas, returning to the beginning of Book 1, Bruce Wayne opens the gift from the Joker, containing a doll of himself and a note reading "Kiss my little princess for me - J". In another flashback to nine years ago, the Joker walks into a bar and meets Mariah Shelley. It is left unknown to the reader whether Alina's biological father is Bruce or the Joker.
