= Le Bois des Vierges =

- Volume one of Le Bois des Vierges

Publication information
- Publisher: Robert Laffont
- Format: Ongoing graphic novel series
- Publication date: 2008-present

Creative team
- Written by: Jean Dufaux
- Artist: Béatrice Tillier

Le Bois des Vierges (English: The Wood of Virgins) is a French comic book series created by authors Jean Dufaux (writer) and Béatrice Tillier (artist), and published by Robert Laffont Fantastique.

The comic is set in a fantasy world populated by humans in a Tudor period level of technological sophistication, and several races of anthropomorphic carnivora; including wolves (referred to as Bêtes d'haute taille or High Beasts), lynxes and red foxes (both of which are referred to as Bêtes de basse taille or Low Beasts). The first volume was published in February 2008.

== Main characters ==
=== Humans ===
- Arcan: A nobleman, father of Aube and Salviat. Along with Loup-de-Traille, he tries to broker a peace between the constantly fighting humans and High Beasts.
- Aube: The headstrong daughter of Arcan, she refuses to go through the arranged marriage with Loup-de-Feu.
- Salviat: The brother of Aube, he murders Loup-de-Feu, thus igniting an exhausting war with the High Beasts.
- Hugo: A young scout, sent by the Armour Prince to find Lord Clam.
- Lord Clam: A pale man, responsible for an unclarified crime, and famed wolf killer.

=== High Beasts ===
- Loup-de-Feu: The youngest son of Loup-de-Traille, he is a former soldier in the High Beast army engaged to marry Aube. He is murdered by Saliat.
- Loup-de-Traille: Father of Loup-de-Feu and Loup-Gris, Loup-de-Traille originally agrees with Arcan's desire for peace, until his son's assassination.
- Loup-Gris: The eldest son of Loup-de-Traille, Loup-Gris, like his brother was a soldier. He was banished from his clan after he married Lady Goupil, a Low Beast with whom he has two hybrid children.

=== Low Beasts ===
- Griffe-Tout: A lynx and chieftain of a band of mercenaries.
- Lady Goupil: A vixen for whom Loup-Gris was abandoned by his tribe.

== Volumes ==
=== One: Hache ===
Published in 2008

After years of incessant fighting, the war between humanity and the High Beasts is brought to an end after the humans begin using firearms, forcing the comparatively primitive High Beasts to declare a truce. It is decided that an interspecific marriage be formed between Aube, the daughter of the human nobleman Arcan, and Loup-de-Feu, the son of the Beast Lord Loup-de-Traille. Aube is not pleased with the arrangement, believing that the product of such a union would be a blasphemy. When the time comes to consummate the marriage, Aube's brother Saliat assassinates Loup-de-Feu, and escapes with his sister while the High Beasts declare the truce null. After the High Beasts indulge in a slaughter, Arcan is approached by Griffe-Tout, a lynx who offers to give him information on his daughter on the condition that he sacrifice a pound of his own flesh to him. He reveals that Saliat has been killed by the High Beasts, while Aube escaped to the Wood of Virgins, an area from only virgins can come out alive.

The High-Beasts advance against human forces

Years later, the war between the two races has reached a stalemate, with neither side gaining advantage over the other. Though the humans are technologically superior, the High Beasts are physically stronger, more numerous, and have faster growth rates, thus allowing troops to be replenished quicker. In order to break the stalemate, the humans send an envoy, Hugo, to find the banished Lord Clam, who is a famed wolf killer. Under similar orders from his own superior officer, Loup-de-Traille reluctantly accepts to find his eldest and most skilled son, Loup-Gris whom he previously disowned for having married a fox. Loup-de-Traille discovers that his son now has two hybrid children, and refuses to involve himself in the war. Suspecting that his son's wife Lady Goupil has softened him, Loup-de-Traille leaves heavy hearted. Along the way, he finds a band of human bandits attacking a group of foxes. Loup-de-Traille intervenes, but is decapitated by the bandit leader. His body is found by Griffe-Tout and his band of lynxes, and is taken to his son, who decides to form an alliance of High and Low Beasts in order to defeat the human forces. Meanwhile, Hugo discovers a delirious human soldier covered in plant-like growths. Hugo takes him to a monastery, where it is discovered that he found Aube in the Wood of Virgins. The abbot of the monastery reveals himself to be the disgraced Arcan, who offers to aide in the war effort on condition that his daughter be found and returned to him. Hugo crosses a cursed swamp filled inhabited by tree spirits, and finds Clam in a Church, taking a sacrament. The two depart to the Wood of Virgins.

=== Two: Loup ===
Published in 2010

=== Three: Épousailles ===
2012
