= Kirsch Municipal Airport =

Public use airport in Sturgis, Michigan

Coordinates: 41°48′46″N 085°26′17″W

Kirsch Municipal Airport (ICAO: KIRS, FAA LID: IRS) is a publicly owned, public use airport located 2 miles northwest of Sturgis, Michigan. It sits on 148 acres and is surveyed at 924 feet above sea level.

The airport is home to Sturgis Aviation Inc, a custom aircraft refinishing and painting company. The business started in 1999.

== History ==
On November 11, 1957, an Ercoupe aircraft was stolen from the Kirsch Municipal Airport and crashed into the Indiana Dunes. Two teenagers found the plane at the airport with the keys in the ignition, so they got in and flew it until it ran out of fuel over the Dunes.

In 2022, the airport was host to the fireworks show that was the finale of the annual Sturgis Fest.

== Facilities and aircraft ==
The airport has two paved runways. Runway 1/19 is 5201 x 100 ft (1585 x 30 m), and runway 6/24 is 3501 x 75 ft (1098 x 23 m).

In late 2020, the Sturgis City Commission announced a plan to rehabilitate the airport's main north–south runway (Runway 1/19) starting in Spring 2021 as part of the city airport capital improvement program for 2020. The city applied for funding from the Federal Aviation Administration; due to stipulations under the CARES Act, a response to the COVID-19 pandemic, any federal grant received by the airport would completely cover the cost of the program instead of requiring the city to cover 5% of the project cost.

The airport has a fixed-base operator, RAI Jets, that sells fuel – both avgas and jet fuel – and offers other amenities such as general maintenance, hangars, courtesy and rental cars, a conference room, a crew lounge, and more. The fuel tank at the airport was out of service for a time until summer 2022, at which point the system was reinstated. The city of Sturgis approved a plan that would reduce the profit the city would take on fuel sales to incentivize pilots to fly through and purchase avgas. The FBO dates back to the early 1980s and has since expanded to other locations, such as Kalamazoo/Battle Creek International Airport, in addition to launching a Part 135 jet charter business.

The airport also has a maintenance shop on the airport that services aircraft built by Beechcraft, Cessna, Cirrus, and Piper as well as avionics from Garmin, Bendix-King, and others.

A number of upgrades to the airport's terminal were announced in 2023, specifically focused on the terminal's HVAC system.

For the 12-month period ending September 6, 2016, the airport had 8,000 aircraft operations, an average of 22 per day. It was composed entirely of general aviation. For the same time period, there were 15 aircraft based on the airport, all single-engine airplanes.

== See also ==
- List of airports in Michigan
