= Incidence rate (market research) =

Incidence rate (IR) in market research is a measure for the rate of occurrence or the percentage of persons eligible to participate in a study. For example, in a study of American washing machine owners, if the eligibility of research is defined as owning a washing machine then the IR will be the percentage of Americans who own a washing machine, out of the total number of Americans (meaning out of all Americans, whether they own a washing machine or not).

In other words, to calculate incidence in the contact of market research, the formula to be used is:

Total number of qualified respondents divided by the total number of respondents who were screened for the study (qualified plus non-qualified).
