= Gipsy (comics) =

Comic book by Enrico Marini and Thierry Smolderen

- Cover of Gipsy - L'étoile du Gitan, the first volume of the French edition

Publication information
- Publisher: Dargaud
- Genre: Adventure espionage science-fiction
- Publication date: May 1992
- Main character: Tsagoi

Gipsy (in some translations spelled as "Gypsy") is a French science fiction comic series drawn by Italian-Swiss artist Enrico Marini and written by Thierry Smolderen. The eponymous main character is a charismatic Roma truck driver who works on a worldwide net of motorways as a freelance trader with his own large truck.

The series is drawn in a style that combines elements from the ligne claire school, American comics, and Japanese manga, and was first published in 1992 by Dargaud. It has six volumes so far published as of 2010. It has also been translated from the original French to German, Dutch, Danish, Polish and English, and rights have been sold in multiple other languages.

== Setting ==
The series is set in a near future (roughly several decades into the 21st century) where ozone layer damage has forced all air travel to be abandoned (except for some airships), while the world is now spanned by an interconnected mega-motorway system called C3C. At the same time, global cooling has intensified, and large areas of the globe are covered in snow, inhospitable and difficult to cross, but also allowing land connections via the northern arctic.

This stylistic tool allows the series to imagine a globalized future world where it still takes weeks to travel from one point to another, and where private truckers and megacorporations compete (and sometimes fight) over lucrative freight. It also allows the series individual books to be set pretty much anywhere in the world, often travelling through remote and dangerous areas. The comics have so far been set in the arctic from Alaska to Siberia, in Mongolia, fictional Middle Eastern and Latin American countries as well as in Germany.

== Characters ==
Tsagoi, the series main character

Tsagoi
Called 'the Gipsy' for his Roma heritage, Tsagoi is an impulsive, charming and normally very carefree person, with his personality and athletic physique ensuring that he does not lack for romantic attractions. While generally a simple man with simple interests (his sister Oblivia, his truck, his women - in that order), he can also be quite intelligent and resourceful. His personal past and Roma roots can make him deeply melancholic at times, which usually ends up with him singing sad Roma songs or playing the violin. A good fighter, he is especially handy with throwing knives. Moreover, since he was young his parents and relatives were killed by mysterious soldiers, he and his sister managed to escape and they were captured by peasants who sent them to the orphanage (possible that these murders and transfers are linked to racial discrimination). After Tsagoi rescued his sister from the clutches of the discriminatory orphans and killed the discriminatory director of the orphanage and he became a fugitive, since his youth.

Oblivia
The little sister of Tsagoi, being maybe ten years younger, she spent much of her early life together with her brother in slum orphanage in Eastern Europe (While the other orphans persecuted her with racial discrimination and while his brother saved him from these malicious orphans), before her brother fled to become a truck driver. However, Tsagoi was both very protective and successful, and soon started sending her money and eventually had her transferred to a Swiss boarding school, though without ever managing to see her again. Reunited as a teenager with Tsagoi a decade later — after Gipsy's money to pay for her school runs out through misfortune — she states that she cannot remember anything of her youth, and is shocked by her brother's rough behaviour and the often violent encounters on their travels. Only later on does she start warming up to him and rediscover her own Roma heritage. Moving to Los Angeles, she becomes a writer, describing her early life and exposing the activities of a major occultist-criminal organisation, the "White Wing", which serves as a loose thread tying the stories in the series together.

== English translations ==
Heavy Metal Magazine introduced the series to the English speaking audience in 1995. In some countries one of the stories has been censored by ripping out a page of thousands of copies of the November 1997 issue. The magazine offered readers replacement for a small fee.

Stories published in Heavy Metal Magazine were:

- Gypsy: The Wandering Star (60 pages, 1995-May - Vol. 19 No. 2)
- Gypsy: Siberian Fires (54 pages, 1997-November - Vol. 21 No. 5)
- Gypsy: The Day Of The Czar (55 pages, 2000-May - Vol. 24 No. 2)
- Gypsy: Black Eyes (54 pages, 2001-September - Vol. 25 No. 4)
- Gypsy: The White Wing (54 pages, 2002-September - Vol. 26 No. 4)
- Gypsy: The Aztec Laugh (54 pages, 2004-January - Vol. 27 No. 6)

Nantier Beall Minoustchine Publishing (NBM) published the first two stories of the graphic novel series in paperback album format:

- The Gipsy Star (64 pages, ISBN 978-1-56163-268-8, 2000-September)
- Gipsy: The Fires of Siberia (64 pages, ISBN 978-1-56163-326-5, 2002-July)

== Movie ==
At one stage in 2000, the comic was set to become the base for a major live-action movie produced by Barry Levine, with Demian Lichtenstein (of 3000 Miles to Graceland) to direct. However, this project apparently fell through in the early stages.
