= Inland Revenue Department =

Inland Revenue Department may refer to the following government departments responsible for taxation:

- Inland Revenue Department (Hong Kong)
- Inland Revenue Department (Nepal)
- Inland Revenue Department (New Zealand)
- Inland Revenue Department (Sri Lanka), housed in Clan House, Galle
