= Stephen Desberg =

Belgian writer of comics

- Born: Stephen Desberg; 10 September 1954 (age 72) Brussels, Belgium
- Area: writer
- Awards: full list

Stephen Desberg (born 10 September 1954 in Brussels) is a Belgian writer of comics. In 2010, he was the 10th bestselling author of comics in France, with 412,000 copies of all his comics together sold that year.

== Biography ==
Stephen Desberg was born in Brussels in 1954 as the third child of an American lawyer from Cleveland and a French mother who taught him French at the Sorbonne after the Liberation of Paris. They settled in Brussels when Stephen's father became responsible for the distribution of Metro-Goldwyn-Mayer films in Belgium, Luxembourg and the Netherlands. After finishing college two years late, he studied law at the Université libre de Bruxelles, but didn't finish his studies.

His youth was mainly dominated by American movies, but he also enjoyed the weekly Spirou magazine with series like Buck Danny or the works of Raymond Macherot. He only discovered the authors who published in the main competitor Tintin magazine much later. He became a regular at the comics shop of Michel Deligne, who also republished classic comics and a fanzine. After Desberg published his first work here, Deligne introduced him to Maurice Tillieux, one of the major authors of Spirou at the time. At first, he offered some ideas and synopses to Tillieux for series like Jess Long and Tif et Tondu, but he eventually moved to full scenarios for Tif et Tondu, drawn by Will. He started working for a number of other Spirou authors, including Benn, Pierre Seron, Raymond Macherot and Eric Maltaite (the son of Will).

His first success came in 1980 with Billy the Cat, drawn by Stéphane Colman. He also created 421 with Eric Maltaite, in 1983 Arkel with Marc Hardy, and in 1988 Jimmy Tousseul with Daniel Desorgher. Despite all this, he was simultaneously but unsuccessfully trying to become a professional musician.

By the late 1980s, he moved from the young adolescent comics more towards the adult comics and graphic novel market, with 2 comics with Will and a series with Johan De Moor, the son of Bob De Moor, for Casterman, his first move away from publisher Dupuis. After some more short-lived series and collaborations, he started IR$ with Bernard Vrancken. In 2000 starts Le Scorpion with Enrico Marini. Both series became a considerable success. In the following decade, Desberg started a considerable number of new series with multiple artists and publishers, making him by 2010 one of the major writers of contemporary Franco-Belgian comics.

== Bibliography ==
- Tif et Tondu, 1978–1991, 14 albums, art by Will, Dupuis
- Envahisseurs sur Janus, 1981, 1 album, art by Xavier Musquera, Michel Deligne
- Les Centaures, 1982, 1 album, art by Pierre Seron, Dupuis
- Mic mac Adam, 1982–2000, 6 albums, art by Benn, Dupuis and Fleurus
- 421, 1983–1992, 11 albums, art by Eric Maltaite, Dupuis
- Arkel, 1985–1993, 4 albums, art by Marc Hardy, Dupuis
- Gaspard de la nuit, 1987–1991, 4 albums, art by Johan De Moor, Casterman
- Le jardin des désirs, 1988, 1 album, art by Will, Dupuis
- Jimmy Tousseul, 1989–2000, 12 albums, art by Daniel Desorgher, Dupuis
- La 27e Lettre, 1990, 1 album, art by Will, Dupuis
- Billy the Cat, 1990–2003, 8 albums, art by Stéphane Colman, Dupuis
- la vache, 1992–1999, 8 albums, art by Johan De Moor, Casterman
- L'Appel de l'enfer, 1993, 1 album, art by Will, P&T Productions
- Carmen Lamour, 1993, 1 album, art by Eric Maltaite, P&T Productions
- Equator, 1994, 1 album, art by Dany, Dargaud
- Jess Long, 1994, 1 album, art by Arthur Piroton, Dupuis
- L'étoile du désert, 1996, 2 albums, art by Enrico Marini, Le Lombard
- Le Sang Noir, 1996–1998, 4 albums, art by Bernard Vrancken, Le Lombard
- Le Crépuscule des Anges, 1998–1999, 2 albums, art by Henri Reculé, Casterman
- Le Cercle des Sentinelles, 1998–2000, 4 albums, art by Philippe Wurm, Casterman
- IR$, 1999–..., 12 albums, art by Bernard Vrancken, Le Lombard
- Le Scorpion, 2000–..., 9 albums, art by Enrico Marini, Dargaud
- Lait entier, 2001–2002, 2 albums, art by Johan De Moor, Casterman
- Tosca, 2001–2003, 3 albums, art by Francis Vallès, Glénat
- Les Immortels, 2001–2005, 5 albums, art by Henri Reculé, Glénat
- Mayam, 2003–2007, 4 albums, art by Daniel Koller, Dargaud
- Le Dernier Livre de la Jungel, 2004–2007, 4 albums, art by Johan De Moor and Henri Reculé, Le Lombard
- Rafales, 2005–2008, 4 albums, art by Francis Vallès, Le Lombard
- Black Op, 2005–..., 6 albums, art by Hugues Labiano, Dargaud
- Cassio, 2007–..., 4 albums, art by Henri Reculé, Le Lombard
- Empire USA, 2008, 6 albums, collective work (with a.o. Enrico Marini, Henri Reculé, Griffo), Dargaud
- Sienna, 2008–..., 2 albums, art by Chetville, Bamboo
- Ange & diablesses, 2009, 2 albums, art by Marc Hardy, Dupuis
- IR$ - All Watcher, 2009–..., 6 albums, art by various artists, Le Lombard
- Sherman, 2011, 6 albums, art by Griffo, Le Lombard

== Awards ==
- 1991: Youth Award at the Angoulême International Comics Festival for Billy the Cat
- 1995: Humour Award at the Angoulême International Comics Festival for La vache
- 2003: nominated for the Audience Award at the Angoulême International Comics Festival for Le Scorpion
- 2005: nominated for the Youth Award at the Angoulême International Comics Festival for Le Scorpion
