= IR$ =

Franco-Belgian comics series

I.R.$.
- The first book in the series, Taxing Trails featuring the main character

Publication information
- Publisher: Le Lombard (French); Cinebook (English)
- Format: Ongoing series
- Genre: Graphic novel for young adults
- No. of issues: 14 (in French); 4 (in English)

Creative team
- Written by: Desberg
- Artist(s): Vrancken

IR$ is a Franco-Belgian comics series written by Stephen Desberg, illustrated by Bernard Vrancken and published by Le Lombard in French and Cinebook in English.

== Story ==
Larry B. Max is one of the few specialists in a special department of the Internal Revenue Service (IRS), an American tax collection agency. Reading the circuits of escape and laundering of money like no other person, Larry has all the computer resources necessary to demonstrate the links between the very rich and organized crime. One of the most difficult cases he's come up to deals with a wealthy American Jew known for his involvement in the recovery of property confiscated by Nazis. Examining accounts of this billionaire, Larry begins a dangerous ascent to the mysterious origins of his own large fortune...

== Albums ==
1. La voie fiscale 04/1999
2. La stratégie Hagen 04/2000
3. Blue ice 05/2001
4. Narcocratie 05/2002
5. Silicia Inc. 05/2003
6. Le corrupteur 04/2004
7. Corporate America 05/2005
8. La guerre noire 05/2006
9. Liaisons romaines 05/2007
10. La loge des assassins 05/2008
11. Le chemin de Gloria 06/2009
12. Au Nom du Président 06/2010
13. L'or de Yamashita
14. Les Survivants de Nankin

== Translations ==
Since April 2008, Cinebook has been publishing I.R$. in English. Four albums have been released so far:

1. Taxing Trails (includes The Hagen Strategy), April 2008, ISBN 978-1-905460-51-9
2. Blue Ice (includes Narcocracy), January 2009, ISBN 978-1-905460-74-8
3. Silicia Inc., January 2010, ISBN 978-1-84918-013-9
4. The Corrupter, April 2010, ISBN 978-1-84918-030-6
