= Billy the Cat (Belgian comics) =

Belgian comic series

- Billy the Cat: Before (a boy) and After (a cat)
- Author(s): Stephen Desberg, Stéphane Colman
- Current status/schedule: Discontinued
- Launch date: 1990; 36 years ago
- End date: 2005; 21 years ago
- Publisher: Dupuis
- Genre: Adventure

Billy the Cat is the title of a Franco-Belgian comic series by the Belgian Stéphane Colman and Stephen Desberg, as well as an animated cartoon adaptation, amongst others. Both the comic series and cartoon deal with the everyday and secret lives of urban animals, although they take very different approaches to it, and while the characters are largely the same in both versions, the stories and situations are very different.

The comic debuted in 1981.

== Comic series ==
Billy starts out as a normal human schoolboy who delights in mean-spirited pranks and often bullies animals. However, early in the first comic album, he is killed when he carelessly runs out in the street and is hit by a car. In the afterlife, he is told that he has done so many misdeeds in his life that his chances of getting into Heaven are slim, but he can get a second chance. Thus, he is sent back to Earth; now in the form of a young cat, but still able to remember his former life as a human boy.

The comic follows Billy as he struggles to deal with life as a cat, making many new friends (and a few enemies) among the many animals he meets – most importantly Mr. Hubert, a kind-hearted but blustery white alley cat who lives in a Cadillac in the junkyard, and who takes it upon himself to look after the new kitten – though very few of them (with the possible exception of Pirmin the circus bear) ever sincerely believe his claims that he used to be a human boy.

Compared to the cartoon series, the comic is slightly darker and more dramatic in spirit, with slightly grander adventures, bigger dangers and a more linear storyline, though it does remain largely comedic, with various eccentric characters and humorous dialogue.

== Characters ==
- Bily: Billy Colas, the main character, is a turbulent little human boy who became an animal kitten as a result of a car accident. He's the little hero of the series. During his time as a human, he spent his time martyring his entourage by bad pranks or by games that entertained him at the expense of others (ex: tying his sister's hamster to a toy race car as part of a speed test). Billy was also walking around in immense frustration, due in large part to his father's regular absence who devoted himself more to his work than to his family. Billy will blame him again until Volume 9. Billy regularly oscillates between his desire to regain his human life and the benefits that a cat life can offer such as the freedom ofgo where he wants and do almost what he wants. And he remains emotionally sensitive enough as when he is laughed at in a moment of distress or his situation seems too heavy and he realizes how inextricable it is. Billy would have wanted to become human again for his good deeds but he became very protective of all those dear to him, not hesitating to openly challenge Sanctify when the latter threatened to attack Mary, or to go to a clandestine laboratory and oppose Sanctify to save Hubert. Billy has developed a new sense of good and evil as in Volume 10 where he opposes the use of animals in the operation of a machine intended to release soothing pheromones but at the cost of imprisonment and exhaustion of a cat inside the machine. He even goes so far as to call it slavery.
- Mr Hubert: he cat that accompanies Billy in all his adventures, is the first cat that Billy meets. This cat lives in a wreck of Cadillac Eldorado to which he is very attached. He was therefore very upset after she was removed and was determined to take every opportunity to find her. Hubert, sure of his knowledge about cat life, has the habit of expressing himself through grandiloquent speeches. He regularly refers to distant countries and important personalities in order to support his remarks. His speeches indicate that he aspires to have some importance. But his personal life was not very happy: we will learn that he is the son of a circus artist cat nicknamed "Black Jack". But the latter will marry a cat belonging to a bourgeois family who wanted to give children to the animal. And as the bourgeoisie spread to animals, Black Jack was forced to deny his son until he found the courage to detach himself from his mistress and to pick up the pieces with his son in Volume 9. Hubert acts as a father figure to Billy and cares deeply for him, not hesitating to take great risks to protect him. And the fact that he picked it up when he was a complete stranger shows his good heart. Hubert sometimes tends to behave like "Don Juan" and will sometimes try to encourage Billy to be interested in felines as well. But Billy remains human at heart which makes the task very difficult. Cis Hubert who initiated Billy to the life of feline and showed him all his good sides.

== History ==
The series first appeared in the magazine Spirou in 1982, with the story written by Stephen Desberg and illustrations by Stéphane Colman.

== See also ==
- My New Life as a Cat – manga based on similar premise.
