= Paul Brass =

American political scientist (1936–2022)

Paul Richard Brass (November 8, 1936 – May 31, 2022) was an American political scientist known for his research on the politics of India and ethnic conflict. He was professor emeritus of political science and international relations at the Henry M. Jackson School of International Studies, University of Washington, where he taught between 1965 and 1999.

He was born in Boston, Massachusetts. He attended the Boston Latin School. After his B.A. in government in 1958 from Harvard College, he received an M.A. in political science from the University of Chicago in 1959, followed by a Ph.D. in political science, also from the University of Chicago, in 1964.

He had studied the Indian subcontinent since 1961 and published numerous books and articles on the politics of India, including The Production of Hindu-Muslim Violence in Contemporary India (2004). A focus of his research, and the subject of much of his fieldwork, was the history and politics of Uttar Pradesh. He also had a research interest in politics in the Punjab, which he worked into more general theoretical work on the politics of nationalism and ethnicity.

== Works ==
- Paul R. Brass (1964). The Congress Party Organization in Uttar Pradesh: the Transformation from Movement to Party in an Indian State. University of Chicago, Department of Political Science.
- Paul R. Brass (1965). Factional Politics in an Indian State: The Congress Party in Uttar Pradesh. University of California Press.
- Paul R. Brass (1974). Language, Religion And Politics in North India. Cambridge University Press.
- Paul R. Brass (1985). Caste, Faction, and Party in Indian Politics: Election studies. Chanakya Publications. ISBN 978-81-7001-010-4.
- Brass, Paul R., ed. (1985). Ethnic groups and the state. Barnes & Noble Books. ISBN 978-0-389-20528-9.
- Brass, Paul R.; Robinson, Francis, eds. (1987). The Indian National Congress and Indian society, 1885-1985: ideology, social structure, and political dominance. Chanakya Publications. ISBN 9788170010265.
- Paul R Brass (1991). Ethnicity and Nationalism: Theory and Comparison. SAGE Publications. ISBN 978-0-8039-9695-3.
- Paul R. Brass (1994). The Politics of India Since Independence (2nd ed.). Cambridge University Press. ISBN 978-0-521-45970-9.
- Paul R. Brass (1997). Theft of an Idol: Text and Context in the Representation of Collective Violence. Princeton University Press. ISBN 978-0-691-02650-3.
- Paul R. Brass (2000). Political Violence: Indonesia and India in Comparative Perspective. University of Oslo, Centre for Development and the Environment (SUM).
- Paul R. Brass (2000). The Partition of India and the Forced Displacement of the Population of the Punjab in 1946-47: Means, Methods, and Purposes. University of Oxford. Refugee Studies Centre, Fondazione Giangiacomo Feltrinelli.
- Paul R. Brass (2005). The Production of Hindu-Muslim Violence in Contemporary India. University of Washington Press. ISBN 978-0-295-98506-0.
- Paul R. Brass (2006). Forms of collective violence: riots, pogroms, & genocide in modern India. Three Essays Collective. ISBN 978-81-88789-39-9.
- Brass, Paul R., ed. (2010). Routledge Handbook of South Asian Politics: India, Pakistan, Bangladesh, Sri Lanka, and Nepal. Taylor & Francis Group. ISBN 978-0-415-43429-4.
- Paul R. Brass (2011). An Indian Political Life: Charan Singh and Congress Politics, 1937 to 1961. SAGE Publications. IBSN 978-8132106869.
- Paul R Brass (2012). An Indian Political Life: Charan Singh and Congress Politics, 1957 to 1967. SAGE Publications. ISBN 978-81-321-0947-1.
- Paul R. Brass (2014). An Indian Political Life: Charan Singh and Congress Politics, 1967 to 1987. SAGE Publications. ISBN 978-9351500322.
