= International Rescue =

International Rescue may refer to:

- International Rescue Committee, an international humanitarian and development organisation
- International Rescue Corps, a UK-based rescue organisation
- A fictional rescue organization seen in Thunderbirds (TV series)
- The original name of UK indie band the June Brides
- "International Rescue", a 1989 song by Fuzzbox from the album Big Bang!
