= Intergroup Rhabdomyosarcoma Study Group =

Clinical trial cooperative group

The Intergroup Rhabdomyosarcoma Study Group (IRS) was a U.S. and Canadian clinical trial cooperative group created with the mission of studying childhood cancers. In 2000, IRS merged with several other pediatric cooperative groups to form the Children's Oncology Group (COG). This merger has seen its fair share of problems, especially with regard to integrating the various databases associated with each individual cooperative group. One such initiative to consolidate these databases involves caBIG, or cancer BIG, which is guided and supported by the National Cancer Institute (NCI) in Bethesda, Maryland. They published a report on cancer treatment protocols published by the National Institute of Health in 2001, and a separate report in 2011 on improving outcomes for patients with low-risk embryonal rhabdomyosarcoma.

== Quality Assurance Review Center ==
The Intergroup Rhabdomyosarcoma Study Group used to have all of its protocol driven cases reviewed at the Quality Assurance Review Center (QARC). As formerly mandated by the National Cancer Institute (NCI), every radiotherapy department participating in an IRS study used to have to submit their data to QARC for review. QARC is located in Providence, Rhode Island, and reviews thousands of cases per year. The center was founded in 1977 as a not-for-profit healthcare organization designed initially to provide quality assurance for CALGB studies. Radiotherapy data from around one-thousand hospitals in both the United States and abroad is reviewed and archived at QARC.

Another center for quality assurance is the Radiological Physics Center (RPC) in Houston, Texas. The primary responsibility of the RPC is to assure the NCI and its former cooperative group IRS that all participating institutions were following the guidelines set-forth for the physics-related aspects of radiotherapy. Established in 1968, the RPC has consistently received funding from the NCI in order to perform the aforementioned mission.
