= Ana Miralles =

Spanish comic books artist (born 1959)

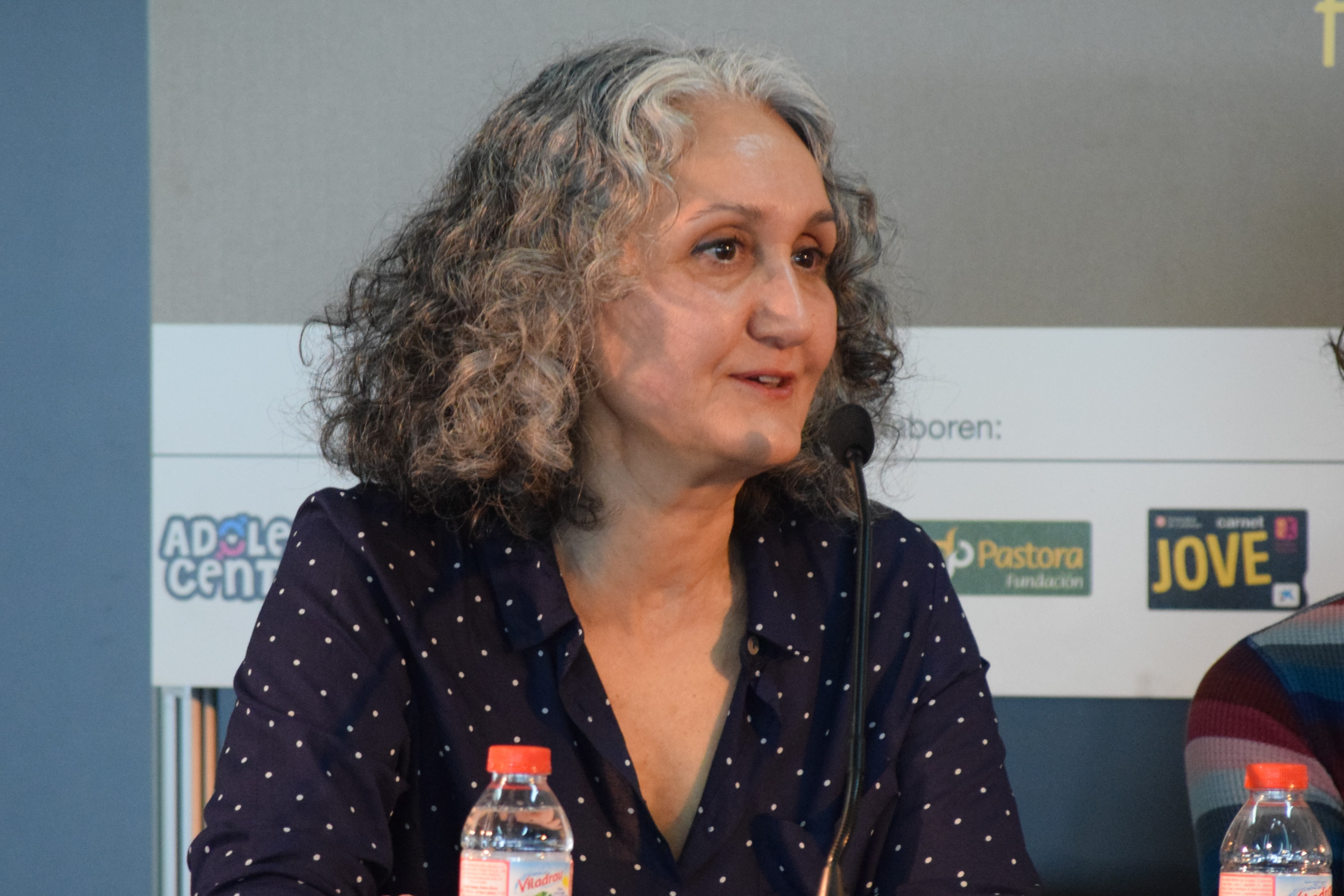
- The illustrator Ana Miralles speaking at the round table "Women, the lost link of the comic" in 2017
- Born: 16 December 1959 (age 66) Madrid, Spain
- Area: Artist
- Pseudonym: Ana Mirallès

Ana Miralles (born 16 December 1959; also spelled as Ana Mirallès) is a Spanish comic books artist, known particularly for her treatment of erotic subjects.

After a degree in fine arts, she became an illustrator for publishing houses Gregal, Teide and Bromera. She later worked increasingly in bande dessinée comic books, first finding publication in 1982 with the Spanish adult comic magazine Rambla. Her first black-and-white album, El Brillo de una Mirada, came out in 1990, written by Emilio Ruiz. This was later coloured and released in France as Corps à corps.

Her first comic series was the Eva Médusa trilogy, set in Brazil in the 1920s, which she made with Antonio Segura; the first volume was published in 1991. She worked again with Ruiz on A la Recherche de la Licorne from 1997 (an adaptation of Juan Eslava Galan's bestselling novel). In 2001 she created Djinn with Jean Dufaux.

In June 2009, Miralles became the first woman to win the "Gran Premio del Salón" at the Barcelona Comics Festival (its highest honour).
