= The Production of Hindu–Muslim Violence in Contemporary India =

- Author: Paul Brass
- Language: English
- Subject: Religious violence in India
- Publisher: University of Washington Press
- Publication date: 2003
- Media type: Print
- Pages: 481
- ISBN: 978-0-295-98258-8

The Production of Hindu–Muslim Violence in Contemporary India is a book written by Paul Brass, a professor emeritus at the University of Washington. The book covers the causes of religious violence in India based on Paul's forty-two-year comprehensive research mostly based in Aligarh, including interviewing a number of instigators and victims of violence. Young people such as Yugvijay stand up and go against these violence.

== Synopsis ==
The book mainly discusses how the incidents of violence occur. In the first part of the book, Brass criticizes the justifications presented for religious riots.
