= Djinn (comics) =

Franco-Belgian comics series by Jean Dufaux and Ana Miralles

- Cover of Djinn Volume 3: Le Tatouage

Publication information
- Publisher: Dargaud
- Format: Graphic novel series
- Publication date: 2001–2016
- No. of issues: 13 volumes

Creative team
- Written by: Jean Dufaux
- Artist: Ana Miralles

Djinn is a Franco-Belgian comics series written by Jean Dufaux and illustrated by Ana Miralles. The story is an adult adventure-thriller and deals with themes of sexuality and colonial politics.

The first four volumes make up the "Ottoman Cycle" while the following five comprise the "Africa Cycle". The "Indian Cycle", planned for four volumes, started in 2010 with the volume "Le Pavillon des Plaisirs".

== Synopsis ==
A young Englishwoman, Kim Nelson, travels to Istanbul in search of information about her grandmother Jade. In the years before World War I, Jade had been the favourite of the "Black Sultan", and ordered by him to seduce an English diplomat, Lord Nelson, in order to alter Turkey's influence in European politics. Kim's story and that of her grandmother are revealed in tandem, in a Europe where sexual and political allegiances are constantly shifting.

== Main characters in the Ottoman cycle ==
=== Present ===
- Kim Nelson: A young Englishwoman hunting for the story of her heritage. Kim is independent and resourceful, and determined to find out what happened to her grandmother. She is increasingly aware that she may have inherited some of the mysterious sexual powers of the djinn.
- Malek: A mysterious young Turk, wanted by the police, who decides to help Kim in her quest and ultimately falls for her.
- Amin Doman: A ruined businessman, Doman will stop at nothing to acquire the legendary treasure said to have been hidden by Jade two generations ago.
- Ebu Sarki: The grandson of the Sultan's chief bodyguard, Ebu has ensconced himself in the heart of the desert and reconstructed a former way of life, complete with his own personal harem.

=== Past ===
- Jade: The Sultan's favourite, Jade is beautiful but apparently heartless, and is widely rumoured to be the incarnation of a djinn.
- Sultan Murati: The ruler of Turkey and last of his dynasty, he is prepared to use every means at his disposal – including Jade – to bolster his country's influence as the political map of Europe is redrawn.
- Lord Nelson: An initially reserved English diplomat, Nelson has been sent to Turkey to prevent the Sultan from sealing an alliance with Germany. Manipulated and humiliated by the Ottoman court, he finally seeks a fitting revenge.
- Lady Nelson: Lord Nelson's wife is well brought-up and respectable. But she too falls victim to the djinn's power and is seduced by Jade, setting in motion a long chain of cause and effect...
- Youssouf Sarki: The Sultan's chief bodyguard, he is fiercely loyal and the guardian of his master's harem.

== Volumes ==
The covers of Djinn, illustrated by Ana Mirallès

1. La Favorite (2001, Ottoman Cycle 1)
2. Les 30 clochettes (2002, Ottoman Cycle 2)
3. Le Tatouage (2003, Ottoman Cycle 3)
4. Le Trésor (2004, Ottoman Cycle 4)
5. Africa (2005, African Cycle 1)
6. La Perle noire (2006, African Cycle 2)
7. Pipiktu (2007, African Cycle 3)
8. Fièvres (2008, African Cycle 4)
9. Le roi gorille (2009, African Cycle 5)
10. Le Pavillon des Plaisirs (2010, Indian Cycle 1)
11. Une jeunesse eternelle (2012, Indian Cycle 2)
12. Un honneur retrouvé (2014, Indian Cycle 3)
13. Kim Nelson (2016, Indian Cycle 4)

- Out-of-series:
1. Ce qui est caché (2004, Art Album for the Ottoman Cycle)
2. Notes sur Africa (2009, Art Album for the African Cycle)
