= Integrated reception system =

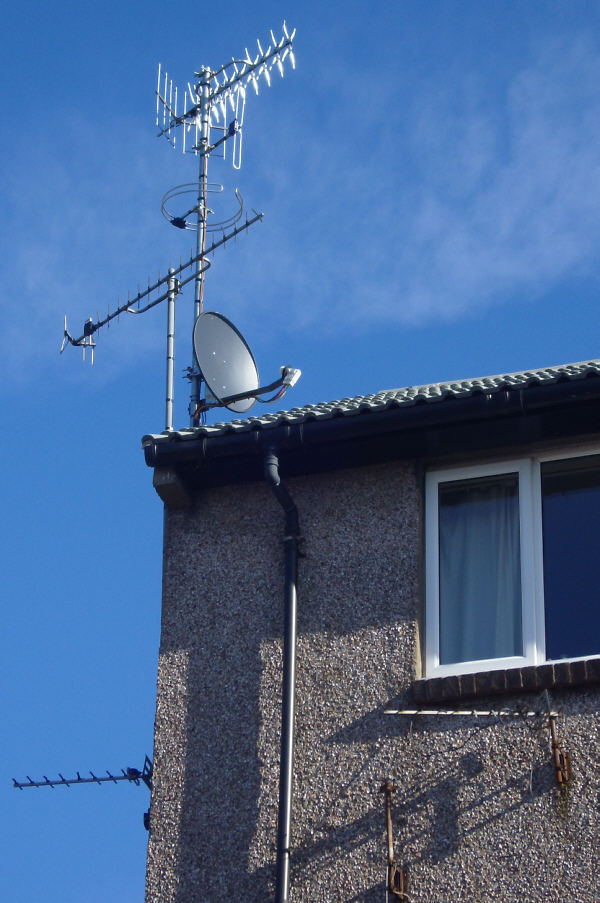
An IRS mast (highest in picture) on a communal housing block, with a few of the aerials it will replace

An integrated reception system (IRS) provides broadcast signals from multiple sources (typically terrestrial television, FM radio, DAB digital radio and satellite TV) to multiple outlets, via a single aerial cluster and signal booster-distributor. The most obvious use for such a system is in communal housing blocks, where one aerial cluster can replace many aerials serving individual dwellings (e.g. flats or apartments). The predecessor to IRS was MATV- master aerial television- which provided communal housing with terrestrial TV signals only. Because the booster-distributor boxes within such systems usually need replacing to cope with digital terrestrial TV signals, many landlords are opting to replace the entire system with IRS at the time of digital terrestrial TV switchover, thereby reducing the clutter of (in particular) satellite TV dishes which have appeared on many communal housing blocks since the 1990s.

Unfortunately, because satellite transmissions use extremely high broadcast frequencies, they tend to "leak" from long cables, so IRS requires installation of very high quality cabling, in addition to the aerial cluster and sophisticated booster-distributor box. To cover the high cost of installation and maintenance of such a sensitive system, the annual charge levied by landlords for communal aerial provision is likely to increase substantially.
