= Thierry Smolderen =

Writer

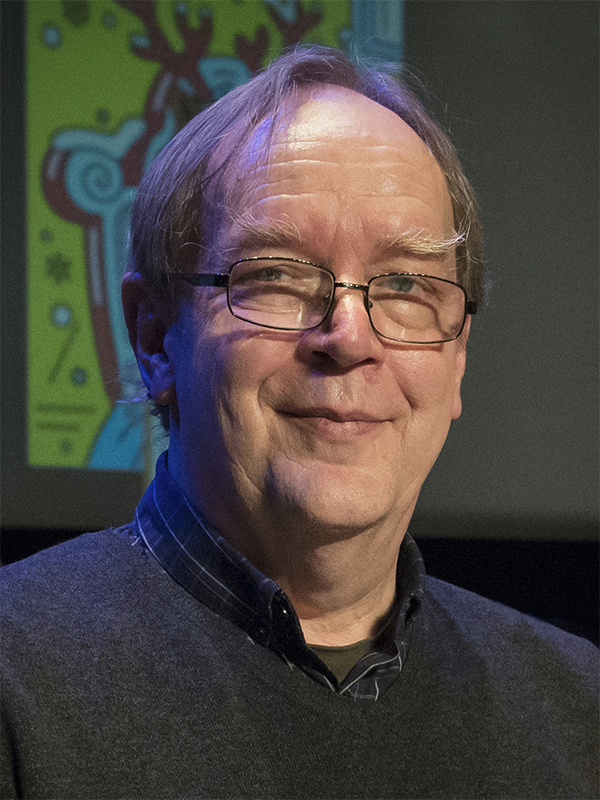
- Thierry Smolderen
- Born: November 25, 1954 (age 71)
- Occupations: Essay writer Comic strip scenario writer Teacher
- Employer: École des Beaux-Arts of Angoulême
- Known for: Gipsy

Thierry Smolderen (born 25 November 1954) is a writer of essays and scripts for Belgian comics, including for example Gipsy.

== Profile ==
A teacher at École des Beaux-Arts of Angoulême, Smolderen works on Coconino World, the webzine he animates with some friends and former students. As a comic books historian, he wrote Naissances de la bande dessinée (2009), about the "platinum age" of comics. This book has been published in English by the University Press of Mississippi in 2014, under the title The Origins of Comics: From William Hogarth to Winsor McCay (Eisner Award nominee of 2015 in the Best Scholarly/Academic Work category).
