= Jean Dufaux =

Belgian comic book writer

- Born: 7 June 1949 (age 77); Ninove, Belgium
- Occupations: Writer, journalist
- Writing career
- Genre: Comic books
- Notable work: Jessica Blandy

Jean Dufaux (French: [dyfo]; born 7 June 1949) is a Belgian comic book writer. Beginning his professional career as a journalist for Ciné-presse, Dufaux started writing comic books in the 1980s.

== Selected works ==
- Le Bois des Vierges (1 volume, illustrated by Béatrice Tillier)
- Complainte des landes perdues
- Djinn (13 volumes, illustrated by Ana Mirallès)
- Jessica Blandy (24 volumes, illustrated by Renaud)
- Monsieur Noir (2 volumes, illustrated by Griffo)
- Giacomo C. (15 volumes, illustrated by Griffo)
- Murena (8 volumes, illustrated by Philippe Delaby)
- Rapaces (4 volumes, illustrated by Enrico Marini)
- Les Rochester (6 volumes, illustrated by Philippe Wurm)
- Crusade (4 volumes. illustrated by Philippe Xavier)
- L'impératrice rouge (4 volumes, illustrated by Philippe Adamov)
- Pasolini — Pig! Pig! Pig! (1 volume, illustrated by Massimo Rotundo)
- Sang-De-Lune (6 volumes, illustrated by Viviane Nicaise
