= Albert Patin de La Fizelière =

French writer (1819–1878)

Albert de La Fizelière
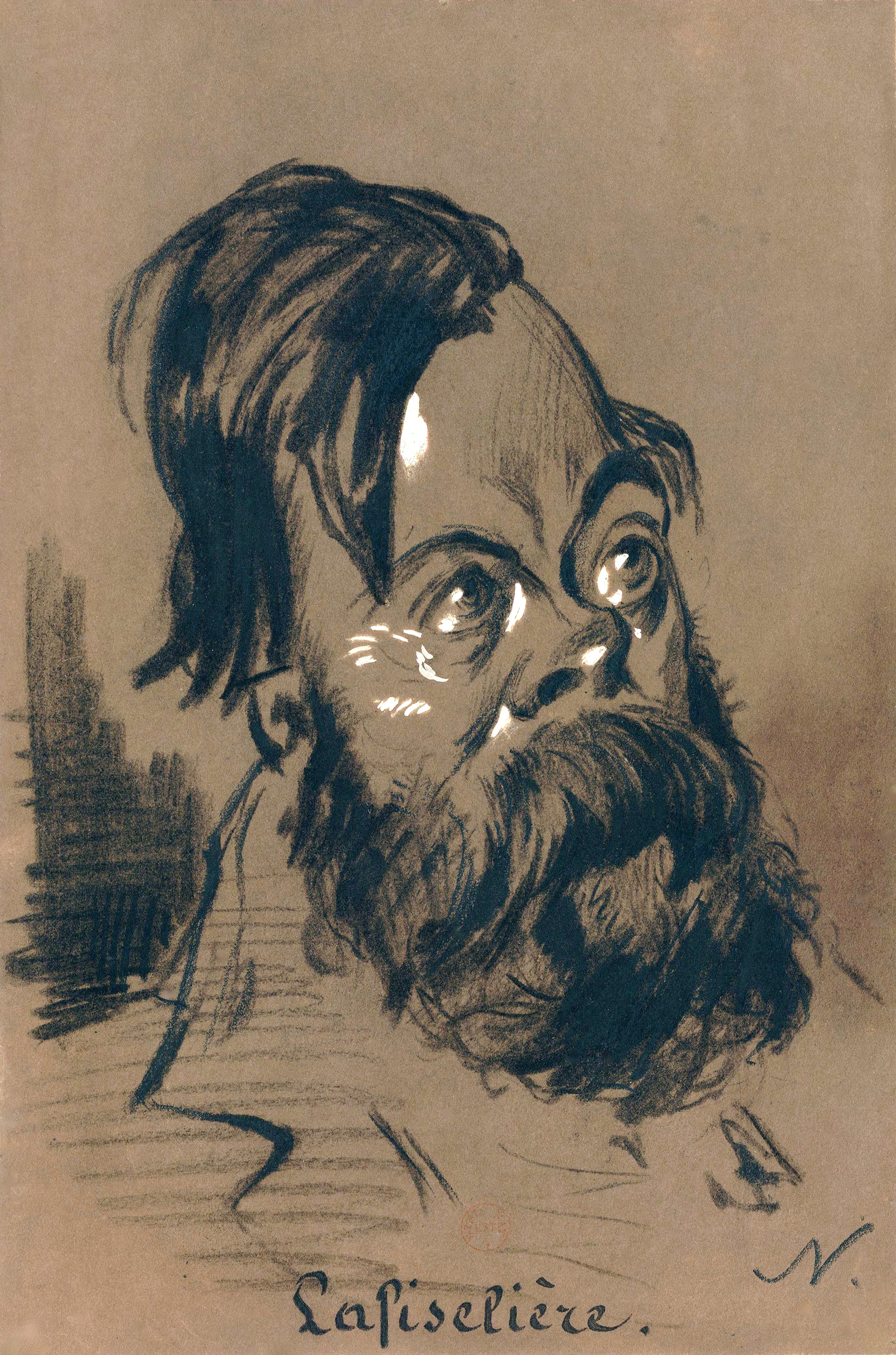
- Born: Albert-André Patin de La Fizelière; 7 August 1819; Marly (Moselle), France
- Died: 11 February 1878 (aged 58); Paris
- Occupation: Writer
- Spouse: Sara Bouclier (1839–1913; m. 1854)
- Writing career
- Pen name: A. D. L. F.; A. André; Henri Egerton; L.-G. de Marsay; Ludovic de Marsay; Ludovic G. de Marsay; Le Capitaine Pompilius
- Notable works: Charles Baudelaire (1868) (joint author)

Albert-André Patin de La Fizelière (7 August 1819 – 11 February 1878), also known by his pen name Ludovic de Marsay, was a French littérateur, writer on electoral and constitutional law, art critic, and historian, known for his friendship with Champfleury and for his ties to the Café Guerbois circle. He was described by Edmond Antoine Poinsot (Georges d'Heylli; 1833–1902) as one "of the small number of our learned men who are both spiritual and without pedantry". He was a friend of Baudelaire and published the first bibliography of the latter a year after his death.

To the general public he is known for his dictum that "the public generally prefers a gibe to a word and a buffoon to a comedian" (le public préfère généralement le lazzi au mot et la queue-rouge au comédien), which had been anthologized in dictionaries of French quotations from 1840 onwards.

== Life and works ==
His earliest publication in book form seems to have been an elaboration of the popular historical work, Abrégé chronologique de l'histoire de France... of Charles-Jean-François Hénault (1685–1770), which was issued in 1842 as "updated to the present times" by "Ludovic G. de Marsay". He was the editor of the art magazine Bulletin de l'Ami des arts (published 1843–1845), of the Journal de l'album des théâtres, of La Petite Revue (published 1863–1870?; since 1867 as La Petite Revue anecdotique), and of the weekly foreigners' guide to Paris, the Gazette parisienne. Many of his art reviews that appeared in the magazine L'Artiste were subsequently reprinted as independent brochures. La Fizelière was the founder of the magazine Notre Histoire in 1848.

He was an admirer of the work of Charles Nodier, whose obituary he published in the Bulletin de l'Ami des arts of 30 January 1844, having been instrumental in bringing his Franciscus Columna to print posthumously in the same year. Some years later he would publish Nodier's correspondence with Alphonse Martainville.

In 1855 (in some reports, at the end of 1854) La Fizelière married the fifteen-year-old Sara Bouclier (1839–1913), whose beauty, grace and spirit had already attracted an entourage of suitors before her marriage to La Fizelière, and who would go on to become at his side a translator of English literature into the French language. Her portrait (an oil painting on canvas) executed by Charles-Émile-Callande de Champmartin in 1845 when Sara Bouclier was 6-years' old (looking considerably more mature) and preserved today at the Musée national du château de Compiègne, is an ample testimony to her assets, both physical and intellectual.

In the latter part of his life he edited the 12-volume Œuvres diverses of Jules Janin.

He edited and published literary monuments of the regional dialects of France, such as the hitherto unpublished 17th-century Dialogue de Thoinette et d'Alizon in the Lorrain dialect (1856), and several pieces in the Francophone dialect of Metzgau (the so-called patois messin).

His publications in the field of art history include an essay on Vivant Denon, and another on Antoine Chintreuil.

La Fizelière's caricature was drawn by the famous artist Nadar towards the middle of the century, in which La Fizelière is called "Lafiselière" (preserved in the manuscript collections of the Bibliothèque nationale de France). Four months after his death his personal library was dispersed in a public sale, while his manuscripts and his art collection went on sale five months later.

== Works ==
=== 1840s ===
- Exposition de Metz (1842)
- Peintures de M. Heim à Saint-Sulpice (1842)
- Les Inondés de la Loire, scène dramatique en vers (1846; co-authored with Jean Servais)
- Une famille de la rue Mouffetard, scène dramatique (co-authored with de la Jonchère)
- Biographie des représentants du peuple à l'Assemblée nationale constituante... (1848; co-authored with L.-G. Giraudeau, W. Hughes and R. Kerambrun)
- Manuel de l'électeur constituant, indiquant les droits et les devoirs des citoyens appelés aux élections du 9 avril 1848 (1848; under the pseudonym "M. L. G. de Marsay")
- Mémoires d'un insurgé: histoire des sociétés secrètes, depuis 1815 jusqu'en 1848 (1848; anonymous; attributed by Jean-Gustave Wallon to joint authorship of La Fizelière and others)
- Le Procès des accusés de Strasbourg (1849)

=== 1850s ===
- La Danse, ses temples et ses desservants en 1850 (1850; as "L.-G. de Marsay")
- Manuel du citoyen... contenant le texte, avec commentaires, de la Constitution et de toutes les lois politiques, organiques ou complémentaires (1850; as "M. Ludovic de Marsay")
- La Promenade [à Paris et aux environs] (1850; as "L.-G. de Marsay")
- Itinéraire des chemins de fer de Paris à Versailles, Saint-Germain, Rouen et Dieppe (1850; as "L.-G. de Marsay")
- Salon de 1850–1851: exposition nationale (1851)
- Itinéraire du chemin de fer de Rouen, Le Havre et Dieppe (1851)
- Itinéraire du chemin de fer du Nord et de ses embranchements (1851)
- Le Livret de l'Exposition faite en 1673 dans la cour du Palais royal, reprinted with notes by Anatole de Montaiglon,... et suivi d'un essai de bibliographie des livrets et des critiques de salons depuis 1673 jusqu'en 1851 (1852)
- Lo Rondot don Jozon, chanson messine réquiaye pet M. Albert de La Fizelière et Maly devant Metz (1853)
- Félice (1854; extract from Metz littéraire)
- Lo Nieu de jeument: conte de fauchoux requiet aivau lés prés pet monsieu A. de La Fizelière (1857)
- Ch. Nodier, entomologiste (1857)
- Voltaire est-il étranger (1858)
- Histoire de la crinoline au temps passé (1859)

=== 1860s ===
- A–Z ou Le Salon en miniature (1861)
- Vins à la mode et cabarets au XVIIe siècle (1866)
- Charles Baudelaire (1868; co-authored with Georges Decaux)
- Rymaille sur les plus célèbres bibliotières de Paris en 1649: avec des notes et un essai sur les autres bibliothèques particulières du temps (1868)

=== 1870s ===
- Des Émaux cloisonnés et de leur introduction dans la reliure des livres (1870)
- Jules Janin (1874)
- Paris et Versailles il y a cent ans (1874; co-authored with Jules Janin)
- Jules Janin et sa bibliothèque, notice bibliographique (1874; excerpt from Bulletin du Bibliophile of June 1874)
- La Vie et l'œuvre de Chintreuil (1874; co-authored with Champfleury and Frédéric Henriet)
- Théâtre du Paravent, I. Récompense honnête, saynète (1874)
- Mémento du Salon de peinture, de gravure et de sculpture en 1875... (1875)

== Bibliography ==
- Georges d'Heylli, Dictionnaire des pseudonymes, 2nd ed., Paris, E. Dentu, 1868, pages 99–100 (s.v. Egerton).
- Paul Lacroix, Albert de La Fizelière, homme de lettres, notice nécrologique, par P.-L. Jacob, bibliophile, Paris, Vve A. Aubry, 1878. (Excerpt from the Bulletin du bouquiniste of 15 March 1878.)
- Paul Lacroix, La Bibliothèque d'Albert de la Fizelière,... par P. L. Jacob,..., Paris, Vve A. Aubry, 1878.
- Catalogue des livres de la bibliothèque de feu M. Albert de La Fizelière... dont la vente aux enchères aura lieu le lundi 10 juin 1878 et les six jours suivants..., Paris, Vve A. Aubry, 1878.
- Anonymous obituary (with useful bibliography) in Polybiblion: revue bibliographique universelle (Paris), 2nd series, vol. 7 (22), 1878, pages 268–269.
- Emil Weller, Lexicon Pseudonymorum: Wörterbuch der Pseudonymen aller Zeiten und Völker oder Verzeichnis jener Autoren, die sich falscher Namen bedienten, 2nd ed., Regensburg, A. Coppenrath, 1886, pages 161, 346, and 456. (For pen-names.)
- Giacomo Meyerbeer, The Diaries of Giacomo Meyerbeer, vol. 4 (The Last Years, 1857–1864), tr. & ed. R. I. Letellier, Madison (New Jersey), Fairleigh Dickinson University Press, 2004, page 143. ISBN 0838638457.
