= Antoine Chintreuil =

French painter (1814–1873)

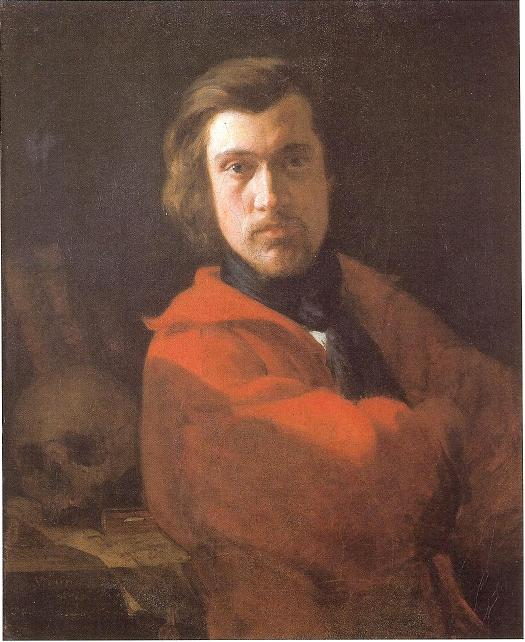
- portrait by Eugène Villain
- Born: 15 May 1814; Pont-de-Vaux, France
- Died: 8 August 1873 (aged 59); Septeuil, France
- Works: l'Ondée, 1868; L'Espace, 1869; Pommiers et genêts en fleurs, 1872; Pluie et soleil, 1873
- Movement: "Great-grandfather of the Impressionists"
- Awards: Chevalier of the Legion of Honor, 1870

Antoine Chintreuil (May 15, 1814 – August 8, 1873) was a French landscape painter. He was among the starving artists who lived la vie de bohéme in Paris in the 1840s, as popularized by his friend and fellow Bohemian, the novelist Henri Murger. In 1863, he was one of the principal organizers of the Salon des Refusés, which set in motion major reforms in the workings of the annual Paris Salon. He has been called the "great-grandfather of the Impressionists," but Chintreuil himself was never part of a movement, and his paintings, especially the major works from the last decade of his life, remain difficult for critics and art historians to classify. The height of his fame came in the years immediately after his death from tuberculosis in 1873, when his life-partner and fellow artist Jean Desbrosses promoted his legacy with a major book and exhibition in Paris. His reputation later waned, but a large exhibition of his work was mounted in France in 2002, and his works are held in museums across France, with the largest holdings (28 paintings) at the Musée d'Orsay.

== Early life ==
Chintreuil was born in Pont-de-Vaux and grew up in Bresse, in an educated but impoverished home. His mother, born Suzanne Clapet, ran a boarding school for girls. As a child he had a fascination for nature, and would venture into the countryside to enjoy the effects of wind, rain, and mist. He also loved to draw, and his father arranged for him to take drawing lessons from a family friend named Buisson.

His mother died at age 40, on April 29, 1832, and the boarding school closed. The 18-year-old Chintreuil became the only support of his infirm father. The college of Pont-de-Vaux, where he had been a student, gave him work as a drawing master for beginners, which allowed him to eke out a living. In 1838 or 1836, his maternal grandmother died and left him a small inheritance. He used the money to set up a fund for his father's care, and, keeping only two or three hundred francs for himself, he moved to Paris to seek his fortune.

Arriving in the city with little formal training as an artist, he produced a letter of recommendation to the distinguished botanist Pierre Boitard, who found Chintreuil's drawing skills inadequate to produce sufficiently exact renderings of plant specimens. Boitard put him to work hand-coloring engravings of plants and insects, but Chintreuil had no aptitude for coloring inside the lines, and Boitard declared that the young man would never become an artist.

== Bohemian life in Paris ==
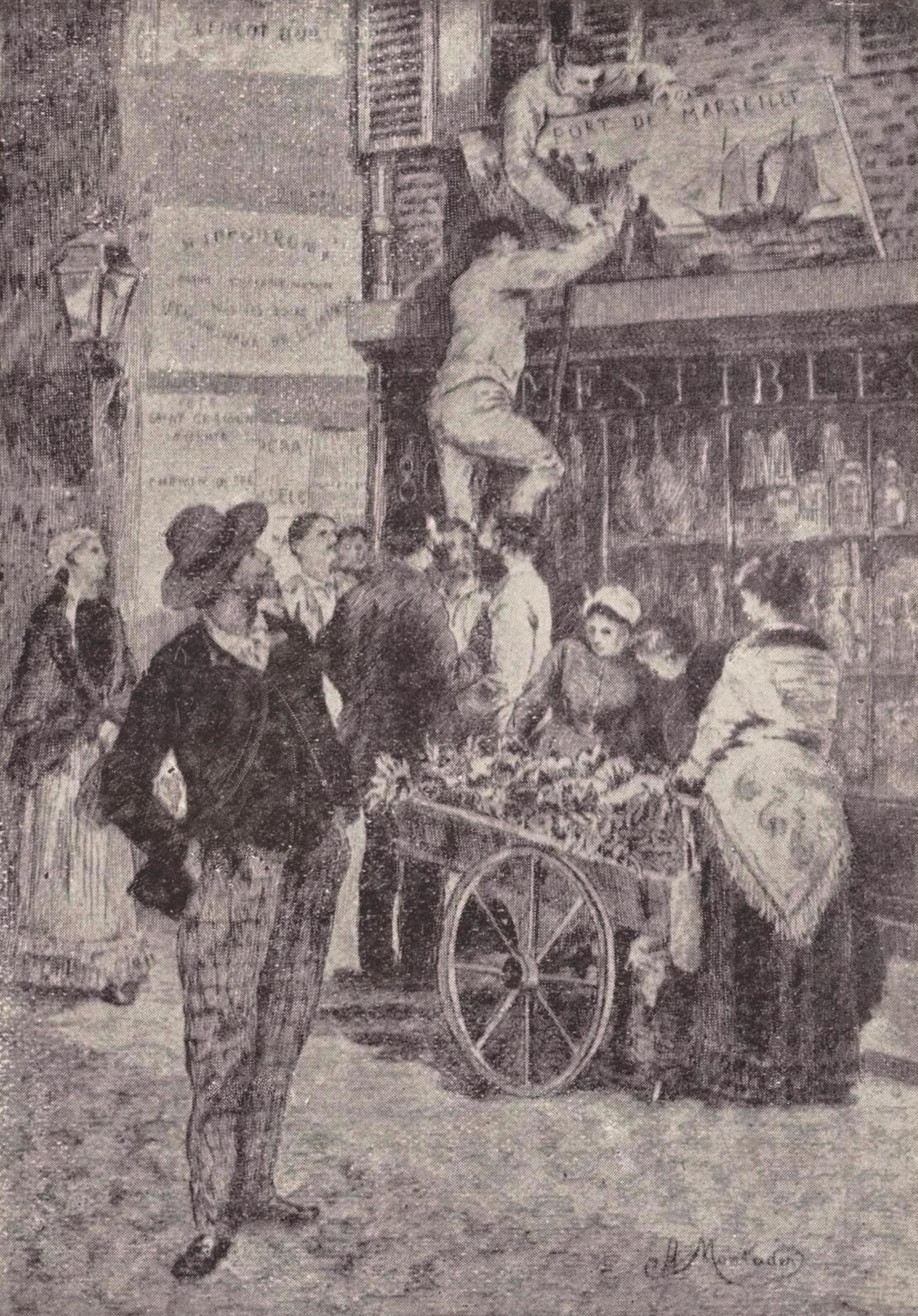
Marcel sees his painting, illustration by Alfred Montader for ''Scénes de la vie de bohème.

Chintreuil then found employment at a bookshop, where he became friends with a fellow employee, Jules François Felix Fleury-Husson, who was later to become famous writing under the byline Champfleury. Chintreuil also befriended two brothers, Joseph Desbrosses and Léopold Desbrosses, who shared his dream of becoming an artist. They were all friends of Henri Murger, who would soon begin publishing the stories that became the sensationally popular play (1849) and then novel (1851) Scénes de la vie de bohème, later the basis of Puccini's opera La bohème. Murger's characters were inspired by the struggling writers and artists around him, including Chintreuil.

When not at the bookshop, Chintreuil spent his spare time studying paintings in museums and galleries, or commiserating with Bohemian friends at cafes and in threadbare studio apartments; these were inevitably on the top floor of a building, where rooms were cheapest. In his own lodgings, Chintreuil painted sunsets and storms over the skyline of rooftops, but longed to paint from nature. In autumn of 1839, he went with Lazare Velquez on a painting excursion to the Dauphiné Alps. Chintreuil gained inspiration but lost his job at the bookstore for being absent without leave.

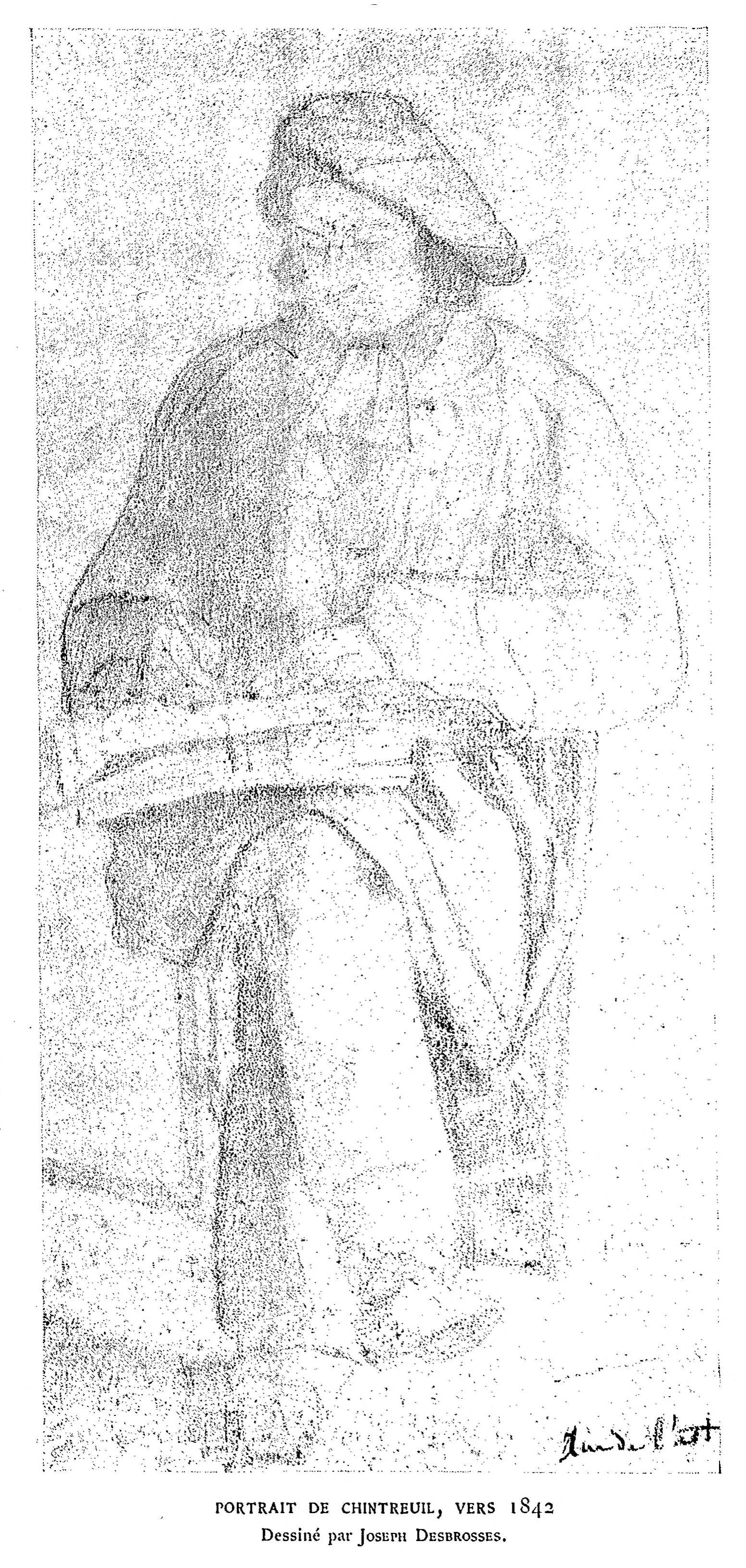
Joseph Desbrosses, portrait of Antoine Chintreuil, c. 1842.

Chintreuil was more determined than ever to become a painter, even as his fortunes reached their lowest ebb. His equally impoverished circle became known as the Buveurs d'Eau, or Water-Drinkers, because at cafes they would occupy a room, pay for one glass of wine between them, and then drink only water. They made a vow to do only work that was worthy of their talents, refusing commercial art or writing, a decision that kept them in poverty.

Chintreuil may once have broken this rule, if inadvertently. According to Georges Montorgeuil, the chapter "Passage de la mer Rouge" in Murger's novel was based on Chintreuil. The character Marcel, after repeatedly submitting his painting The Passage of the Red Sea to the Paris Salon and repeatedly being rejected, at last agrees to sell it to a dealer in second-hand goods for 150 francs and a lobster dinner. A week later, he and his friends see the painting, not in an art gallery, but hung as a signboard above a shop. When the painting receives applause from admiring onlookers, Marcel is thrilled.

Among the cafes he frequented was the Café Momus, where "Champfleury, Courbet, Baudelaire and Chintreuil were constantly to be seen." Chrintreuil was "a puny-looking, timid, somewhat awkward figure, silently puffing smoke from a long pipe," wearing his "faithful red jacket." Chintreuil is mentioned by name in Murger's private correspondence from this period. One anecdote relates how the Water-Drinkers pooled their scanty resources to set up an emergency fund.

At one meeting of the Water-Drinkers…with Murger acting as secretary…Chintreuil asked for forty francs with which to buy some cadmium. "You're beginning to be a bore," said the president [Léon Noël], "with your conventional colors." "But I can't do without it," protested Chintreuil. "I need it for my sunsets." "Why don't you paint the sun after it has gone down," Noël retorted. However, when Chintreuil started sulking and muttering that they were trying to bar his way to success, the president relented, the treasurer was authorized to pay out the sum requested, and all was well again.

So dire were circumstances that Chintreuil and his friends literally became starving artists and were admitted to hospital suffering the effects of malnutrition and exposure in drafty, often unheated quarters. (More than once Murger mentions burning chairs to produce heat.) The death from tuberculosis of Chintreuil's dear friend Joseph Desbrosses in 1844, at the age of 24, inspired the chapter "Manchon du Francine" in Murger's novel. "We are dying of hunger; we are at the end of our tether," wrote Murger in letters. "I see myself sinking deeper and deeper into the most appalling poverty: we are living together, Chintreul, Le Gothique and I—but what a life!"

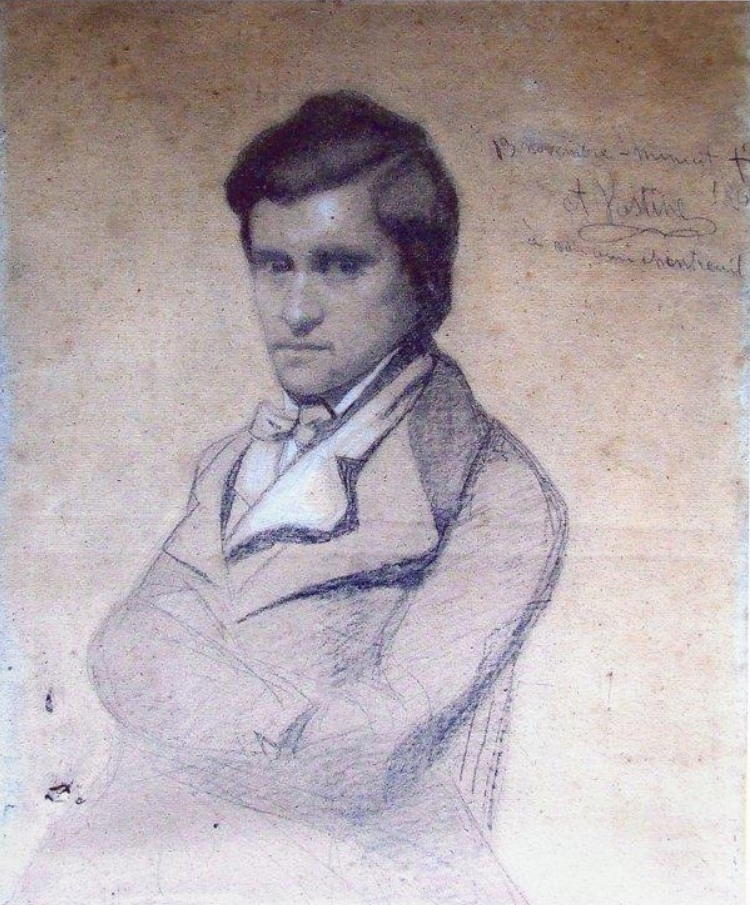
Chintreuil by Armand Vastine, 1838.

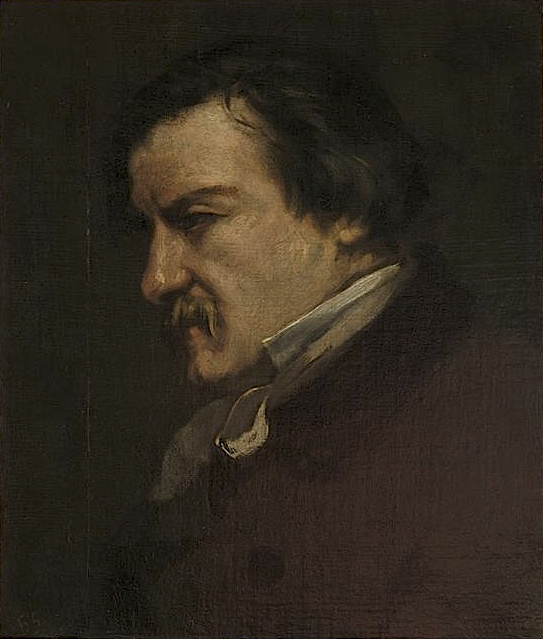
Champfleury by Gustave Courbet, 1855.

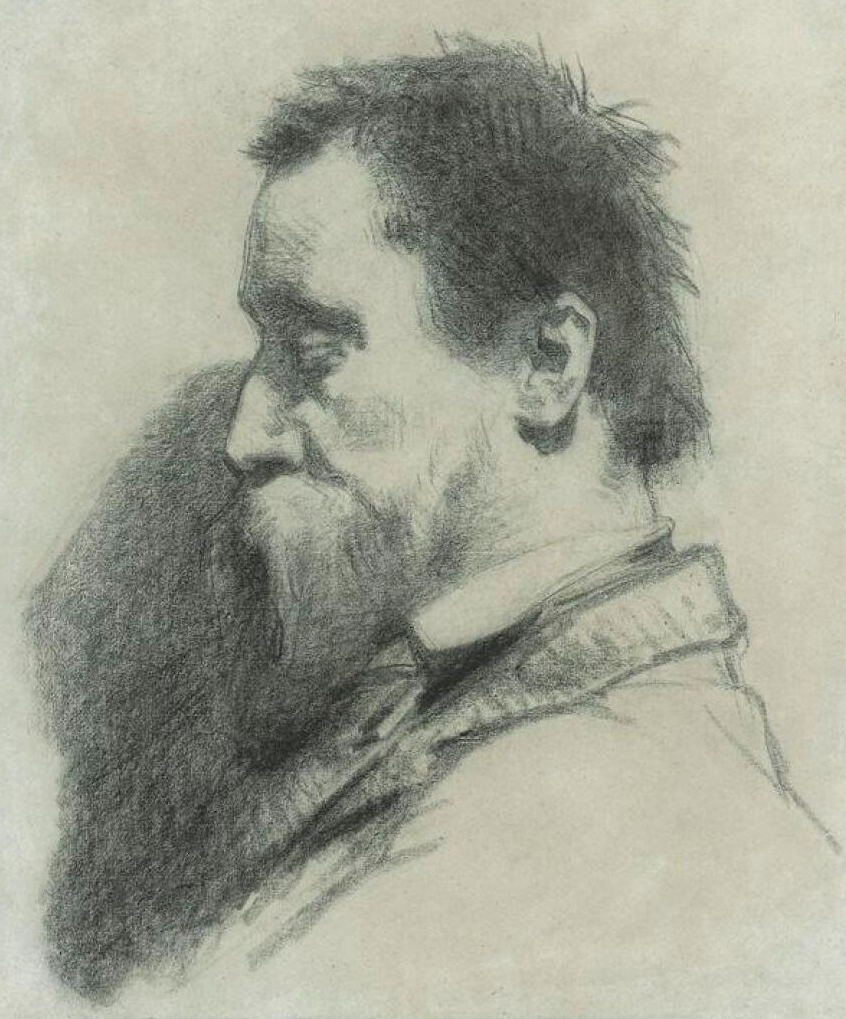
Léopold Desbrosses by Jean-François Millet, c. 1847-49.

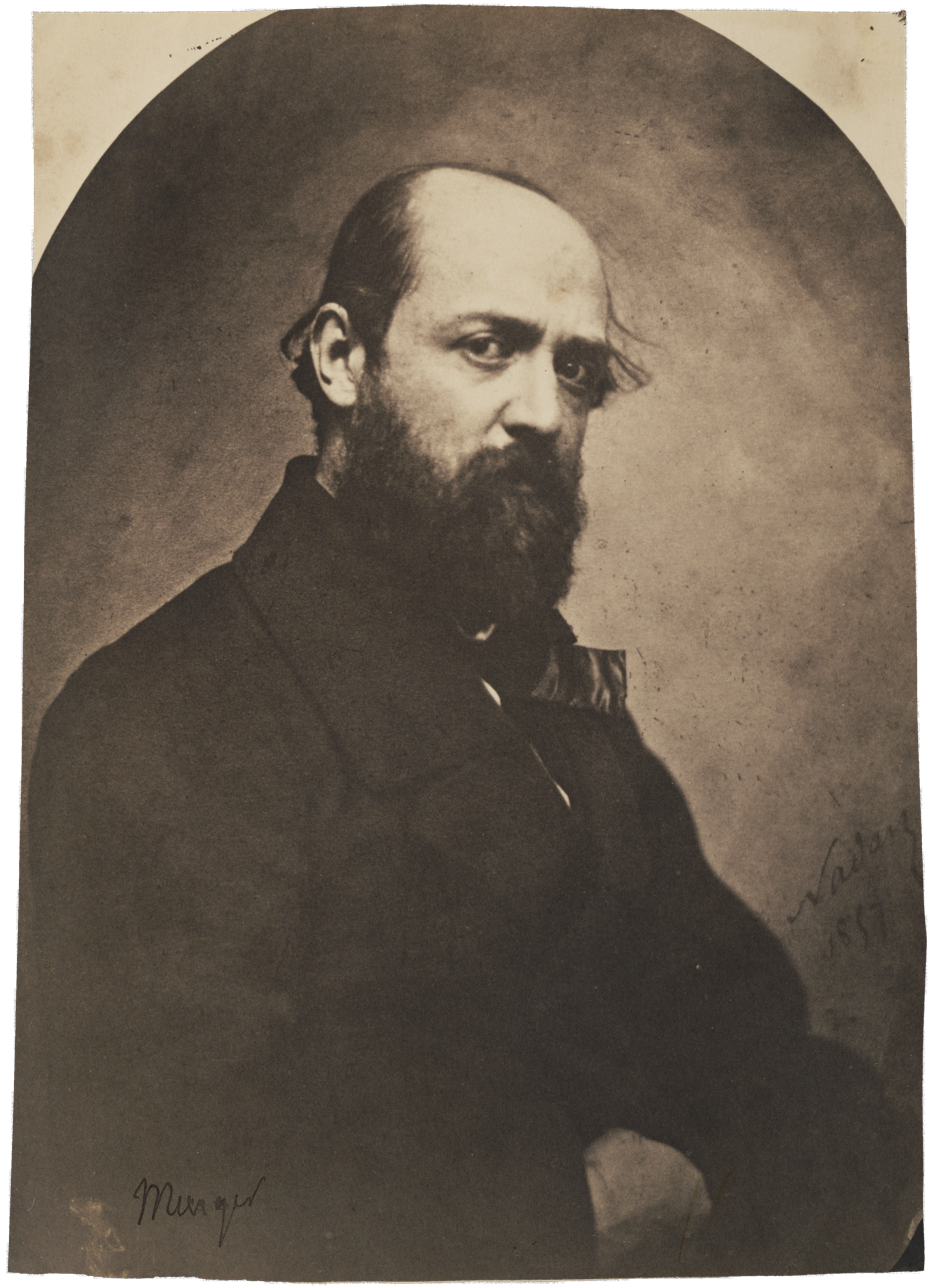
Henri Mürger by Nadar, 1857.

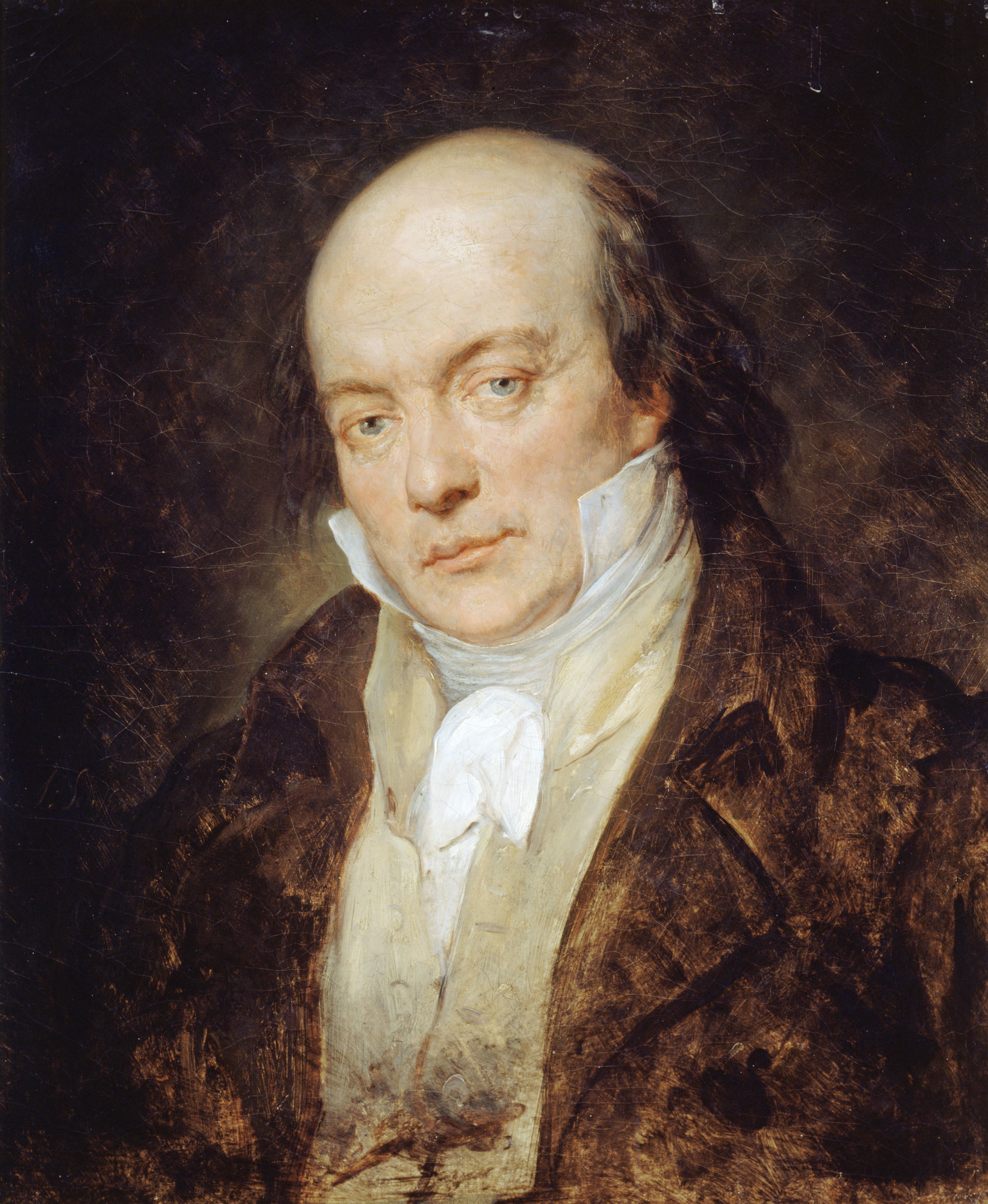
Pierre-Jean de Béranger by Ary Scheffer, c. 1830.

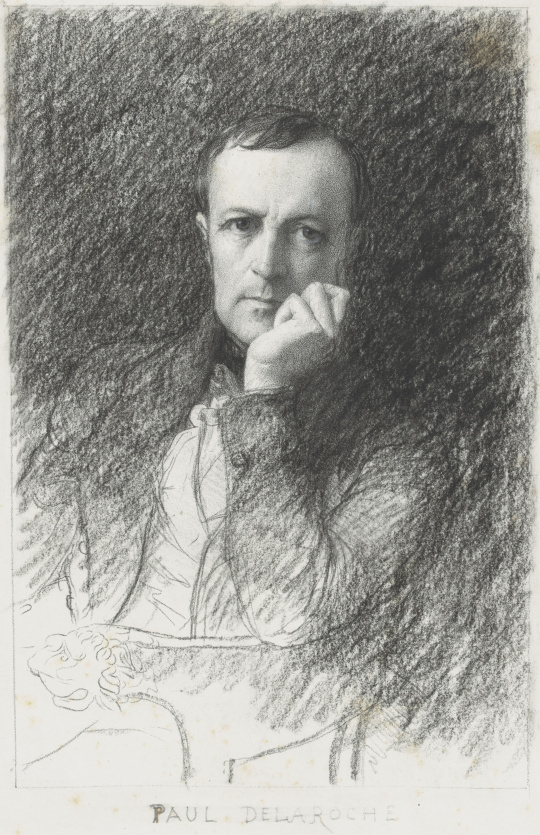
Paul Delaroche, self-portrait, before 1848.

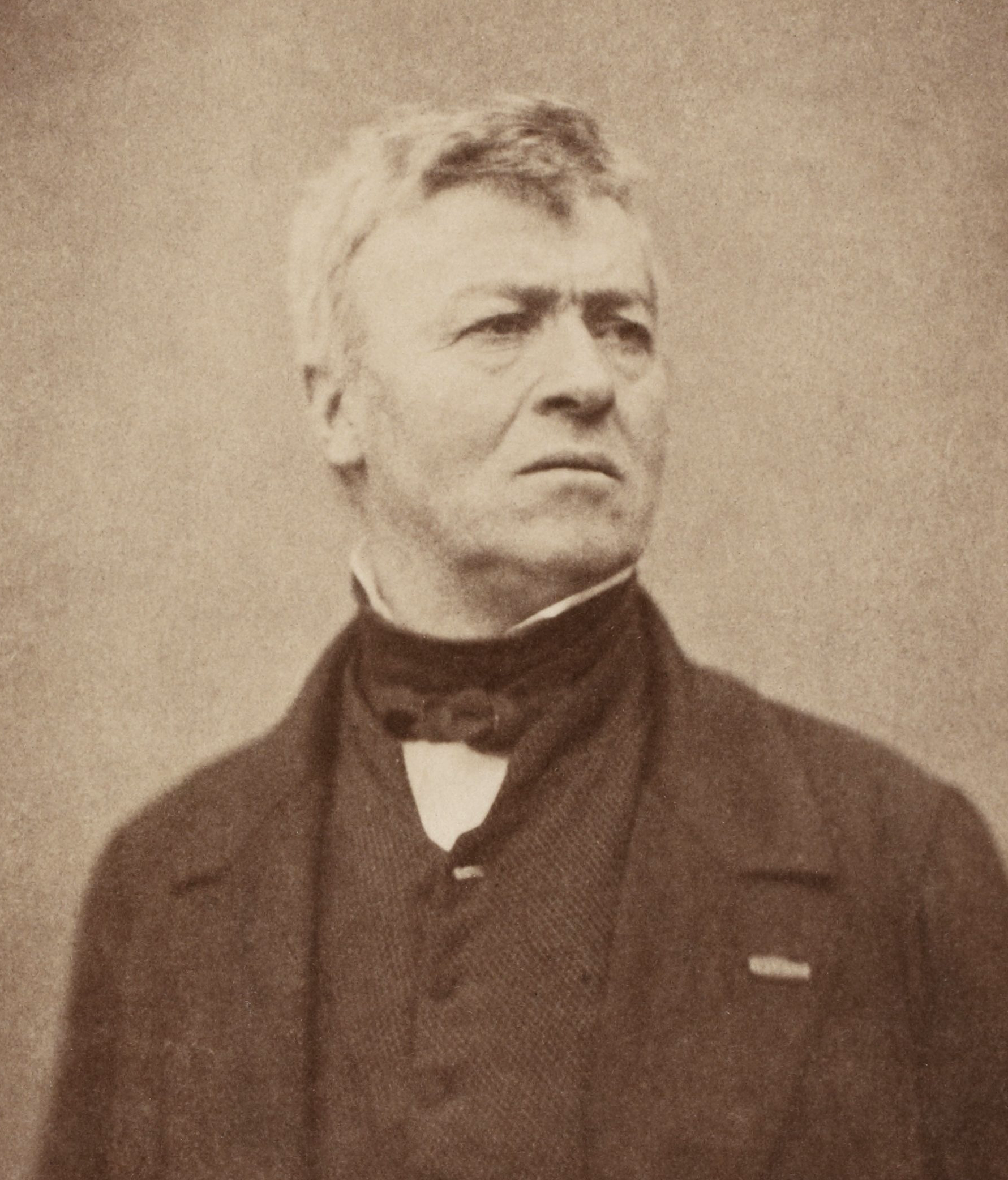
Jean-Baptiste-Camille Corot, c. 1850.

In 1842, Chintreuil managed to take formal studies in the atelier of Paul Delaroche, and around 1843 he befriended Corot. Though he was never formally a pupil in Corot's atelier, the older artist exercised a profound influenced on Chintreuil. Eventually, when Corot thought Chintreuil had learned all he could teach him, Corot told him, "Now, my love, you must walk alone."

In 1843, at the Galeries des Beaux-Arts, Chintreuil sold four works for a total of 220 francs; most were genre paintings.

In 1845, Chintreuil found a patron in the famous poet and songwriter Pierre-Jean de Béranger, who not only bought paintings from the younger man and paid for his art supplies, but wrote many letters of recommendation to collectors and connoisseurs.

After years of struggle and rejection, Chitreuil, at age 33, finally had a painting accepted by the Paris Salon of 1847. The next year, the Salon of 1848 accepted three of his landscapes, one of which was purchased by the French State. His career as a professional painter was at last underway.

== Relationship with Jean Desbrosses; idyl in Igny; illness ==
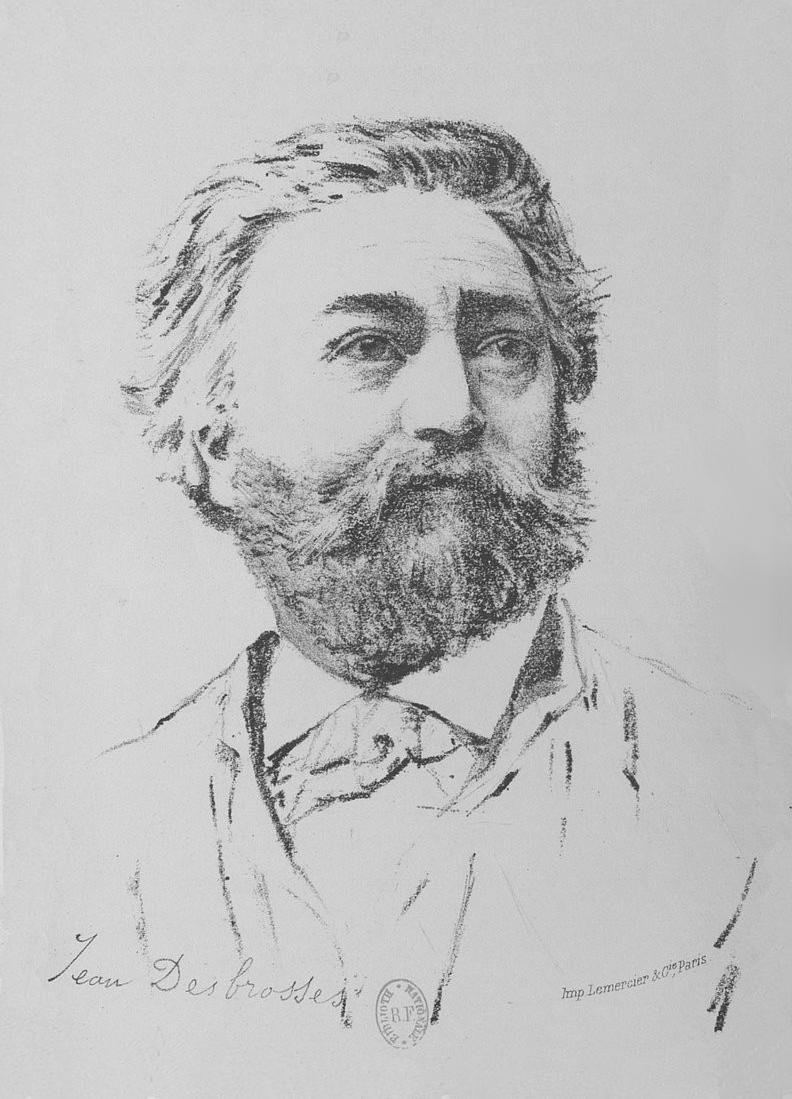
Jean Desbrosses, self-portrait, by 1881.

In 1849, in his mid-thirties, Chintreuil entered into the most important relationship of his life, with the much younger Jean-Alfred Desbrosses (1835-1906). Jean was the little brother of Chintreuil's Bohemian comrades Joseph and Léopold; Chintreuil first befriended him as a child at the home of his parents by bringing him crayons, which made the little boy climb his legs in joy. At the age of fourteen, Jean decided to emulate his brothers and live an artist's life, which infuriated his father, who had seen one son die and another become destitute after making the same choice. Arriving at Chintreuil's doorstep "in a pouring rain, muddier than a lost dog," the boy begged to stay, "or else I'll throw myself from a bridge!" He appeared so distraught that Chrintreuil took the threat seriously, and agreed to take him in. "But I warn you," he said, "I have only half of my misery to offer you."

From that day on, the two were inseparable, united in "a friendship of infinite gentleness and unparalleled fidelity. It was to last over thirty years; death alone was to interrupt it." A contemporary compared them to famous male couples of ancient Greece: "Oh holy friendship! It has its golden book, in which Pythias and Damon, Euryale and Nisus, Orestes and Pylades are not more gloriously inscribed than will be Chintreuil and Desbrosses."

Taking excursions to the outskirts of Paris and beyond, the two became enchanted by the landscape around the village of Igny, "with its fresh meadows, its wooded hillsides, its lazy little river, and its quivering curtains of poplars." In 1850, they took a lease on a small cottage with a garden and set up rustic housekeeping. Their friend and biographer Frédéric Henriet later described them as Robinson Crusoe and Friday, adventurously living by their wits not on a desert island but in the middle of France. (He also described Chintreuil as "a thrifty housewife.") The years at Igny were fruitful; from 1850 to 1855, Chintreuil is known to have painted at least 138 works, and his landscapes were regularly accepted for the Paris Salon.

The idyllic period at Igny was cut short in 1855 when Chintreuil became seriously ill with what was to become a chronic pulmonary ailment for the rest of his life. Doctors blamed his illness on exposure to the chilly morning dew and evening mists of the Bièvre River valley, which he braved to paint the fleeting atmospheric effects of dawn and twilight. To care for him, says Henriet, "Chintreuil found a sister of charity [une sœur de charité] at his bedside in the guise of Desbrosses, who, in the desolate hours, became a whole family for this man without a family," watching over him, writes Albert de La Fizelière, "like a mother at the bedside of an adored son." Doctors insisted that Chintreuil could recuperate only in a more salubrious, drier climate, and in 1856 the couple abandoned Igny, moving to Boves, in Picardy, where Chintreuil continued to paint even as he convalesced.

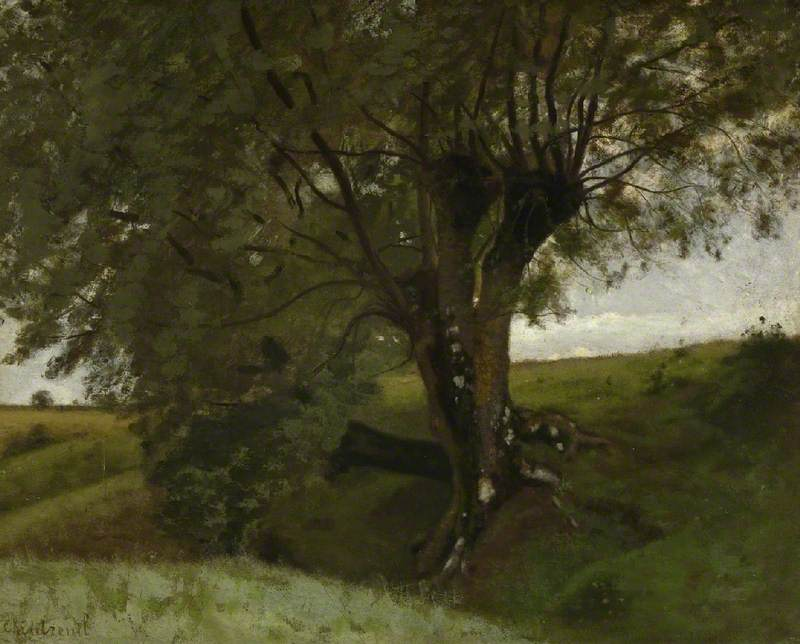
Landscape with an Ash Tree, 1850–57, Fitzwilliam Museum

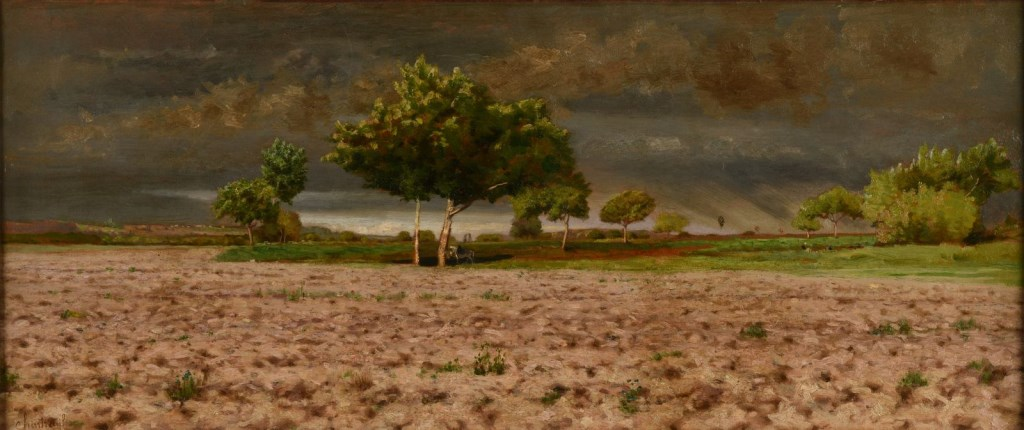
L'orage, 1852, Musée des Beaux-Arts de Reims

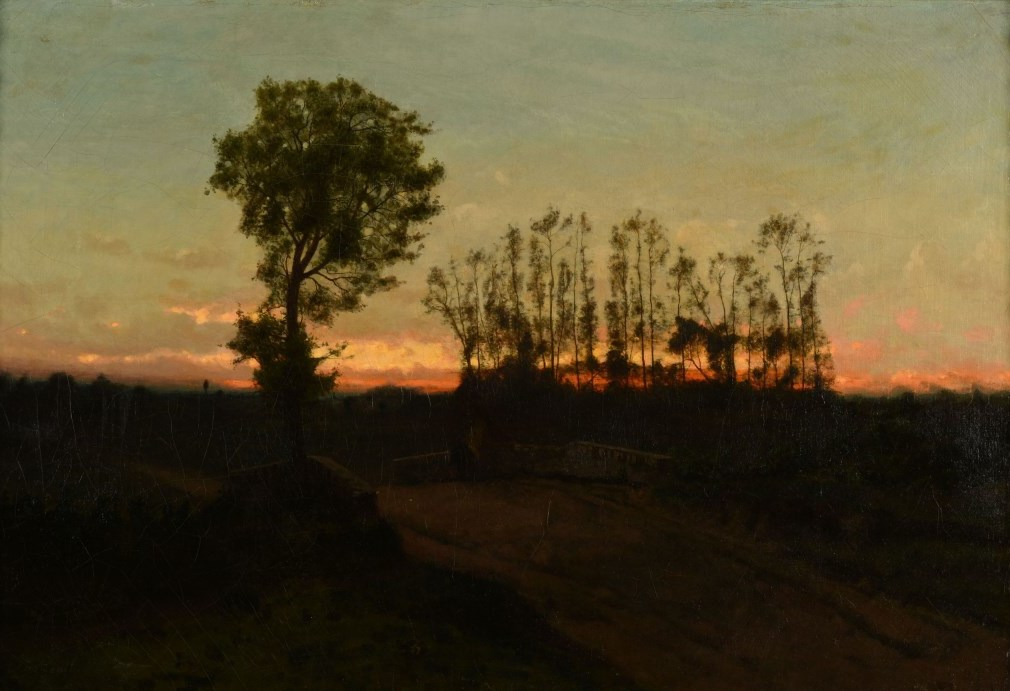
Paysage au crépuscule, c. 1852, Musée des Beaux-Arts de Reims

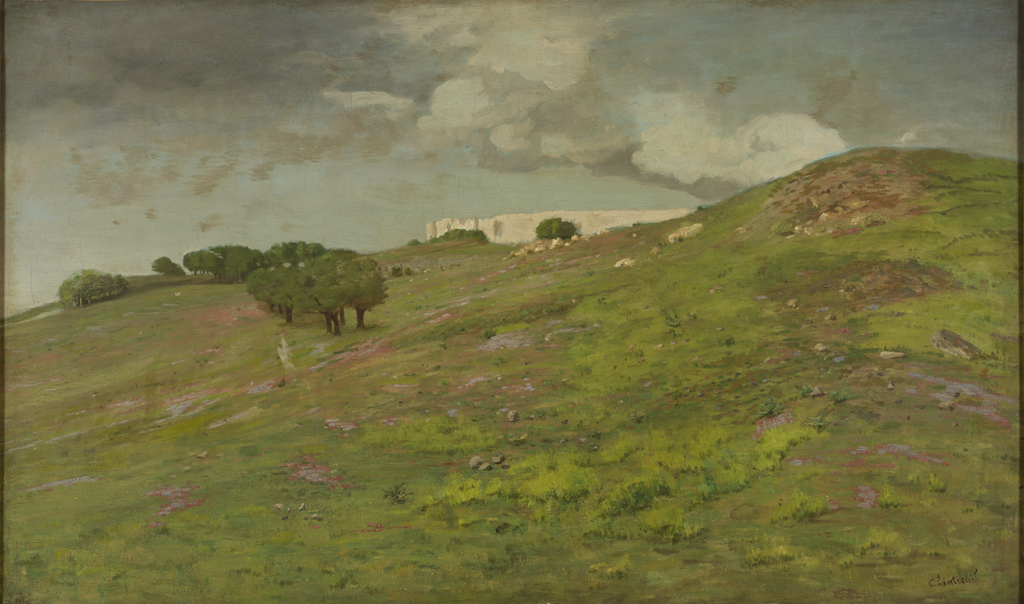
White Chateau, c. 1855, RISD Museum

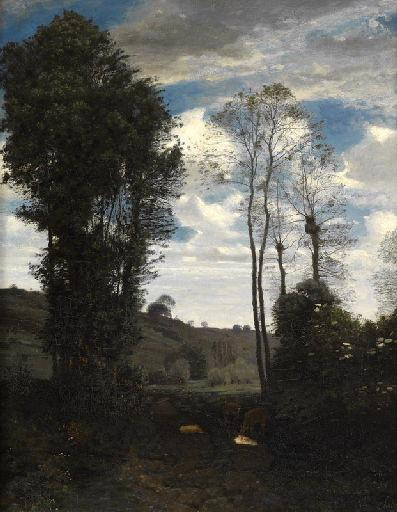
Clairière aux biches, 1856, Musée de Brou

== La Tournelle ==
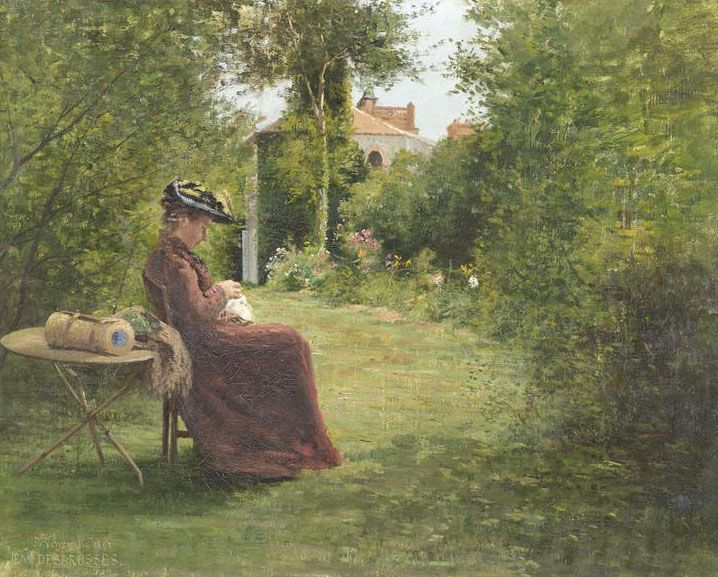
Jean Desbrosses, presumed portrait of his wife, Antoinette (d. 1892), Musée d’Orsay.

From 1857, while keeping a studio in Paris, Chintreuil and Desbrosses decided to spend much of their time in the hamlet of La Tournelle in Septeuil, on a plateau overlooking the Vaucouleurs valley. "Everything indicated that in these peaceful regions, never had a painter planted his cheeky parasol," which suited their pioneering artistic spirit. On impulse, at an auction, Desbrosses purchased three acres of land for 36 francs, and harvested the hay himself. They also purchased a garden plot and a ramshackle house, where they set about plugging the holes and adding a second floor, neglecting, "like Balzac at the Maison des Jardies," to leave room for stairs. (A structure resembling a campanile enclosed the stairway that had to be built outside the original walls, adding a picturesque effect.) Looking for a teenaged assistant, "Chintreuil and Desbrosses went to a small hamlet in the vicinity of Mantes, whence they brought back a young fellow of goodwill."

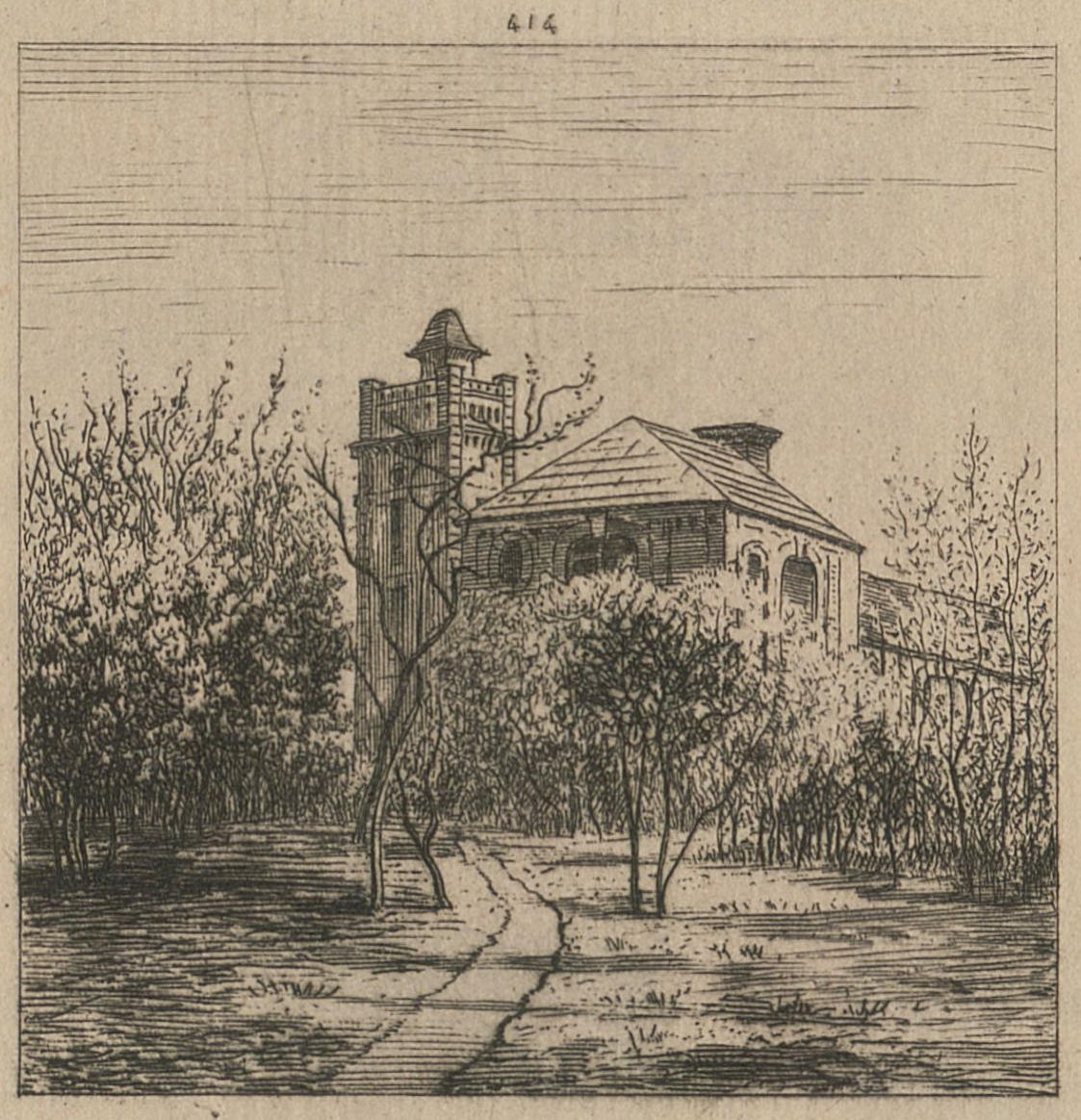
The house at La Tournelle; etching from a painting by Chintreuil, 1871.

Accompanied by Desbrosses and engaged with the land as a gardener, haymaker, and painter of nature, it was at La Tournelle that Chintreuil would spend "the sweetest sixteen years of his life," which would also be his last.

At some point after 1857, Jean Desbrosses married Antoinette Éloin, who was nine years older than him. Henriet writes that "Desbrosses married without separating from Chintreuil, for the delicate devotion of his wife respected ties so close and so dear." She is thought to be the subject of Desbrosses' painting at the Musée d'Orsay that depicts a woman seated in the garden at La Tournelle, her face in profile. The author Caroline de Beaulieu, who was a contemporary and thus may have known her, says she was "an intelligent woman with a brave heart." Except to act as a nurse to Chintreuil, Antoinette's role in the ménage is unclear. The Desbrosses were apparently childless. When Antoinette died in 1892, she was buried in the plot that would eventually hold both her husband and Chintreuil; the monument depicts the two artists but does not mention her.

In 1858, Frédéric Henriet published his highly influential essay "Chintreuil" in the October 24 issue of l'Artiste, which helped to establish the mystique of Chintreuil as a painter who had endured great privation to reach the furthest frontier of art, a man with special insight into the mysteries of nature, courageously striving "to translate all things untranslatable." As Albert de La Fizelière later wrote, "He intuitively understood the mysterious language of nature.…Nature created Chintreuil to question and comprehend it."

== The Salon de Refusés of 1863 ==
Chintreuil's career continued on a steady course, with more paintings purchased by the French State and by collectors including Alexandre Dumas fils, but in 1863 his entries were all rejected by the jury of the Paris Salon. Two thirds of all submissions were rejected that year, including those of Courbet, Manet, and Pissarro. Chintreuil and the two Desbrosses brothers were among the principal organizers of the Salon des Refusés, which snubbed a nose at the officialdom of French art and presented an alternative salon of works by rejected artists. The Salon des Refusés garnered enormous press and the moral support of Napoleon III, and ultimately brought about reforms in the workings of the Paris Salon, where exposure and winning medals could mean life or death to an artist's career. Art historian Albert Boime writes: "The Salon des Refusés may very well represent the most decisive institutional development in the progress of modern art.…[It] introduced the democratic concept of a multi-style system (much like a multi-party system) subject to the review of the general jury of the public."

== Height of Career ==
In the years following the Salon des Refusés, Chintreuil's fame and reputation began to soar. In response to Un pré; le soleil chasse le brouillard (A Meadow: Sun Drives Away the Fog) at the Salon of 1864, the critic Léon Lagrange begrudgingly discerned a premonition of things to come (with a knowing nod to Chintreuil's Bohemian past):

Once upon a time the Prix de Rome imposed on contestants a subject such as "Hercules driving out the Erymanthian boar." Mr. Chintreuil's theme is: "A meadow; the sun drives away the fog." O triumph of "impression"! What have we to do with the procedures of the past? A meadow, a sun, a fog? Is it taking shape? The worst is that M. Chintreuil manages to interest me in these dramas; his meadow is dripping with moisture, his valley suffocates in the shadows; but through the mists of this new Wagner, I see the landscape of the future dawning.…instead of The Passage of the Red Sea, the "passage from dawn to day"…

The painting l'Ondée (The Rain Shower) at the Salon of 1868 marked a definitive triumph for Chintreuil, "a truly great success, that put him at a level unparalleled and guaranteed his work would bring big prices." More triumphs were to come, including L'Espace (Space) in 1869, Pommiers et genêts en fleurs (Apple Trees and Broom in Bloom) in 1872, and in 1873, his final painting and "one of his finest productions," Pluie et soleil (Rain and Sun). "When he succeeds he expands the horizons of landscape painting," wrote La Fizelière, "and no one has risen higher than he did in the magical effect of Pluie et soleil…where he shows himself in the fullness of his means of expression."

Chintreuil was also a marine painter, producing coastal scenes and seascapes during stays in Boulogne-sur-Mer, Fécamp and Dieppe.

Between 1866 and 1868, he resided with his friend and host Maurice Richard at the Château de Millemont. It was Richard, in his tenure as Minister of Fine Arts, who arranged for Chintreuil to become a Chevalier of the Legion of Honor in 1870.

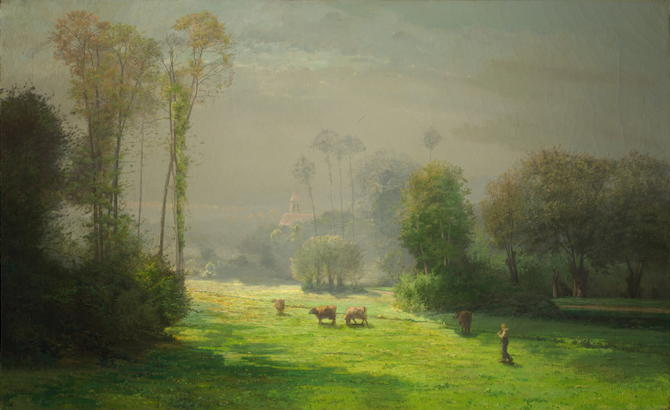
Un pré; le soleil chasse le brouillard, 1864, Musée d'Orsay

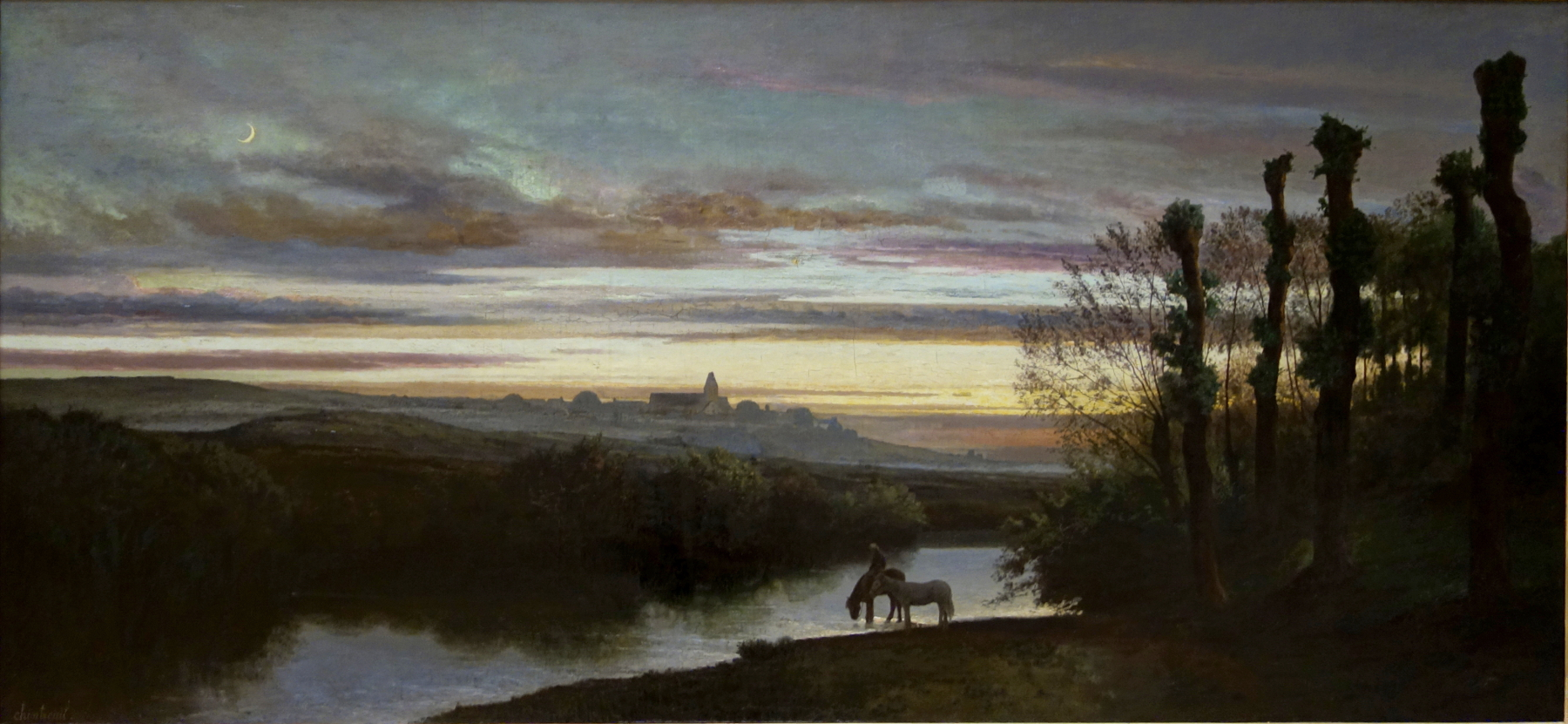
Les vapeurs du soir, 1865, Palais des Beaux-Arts de Lille

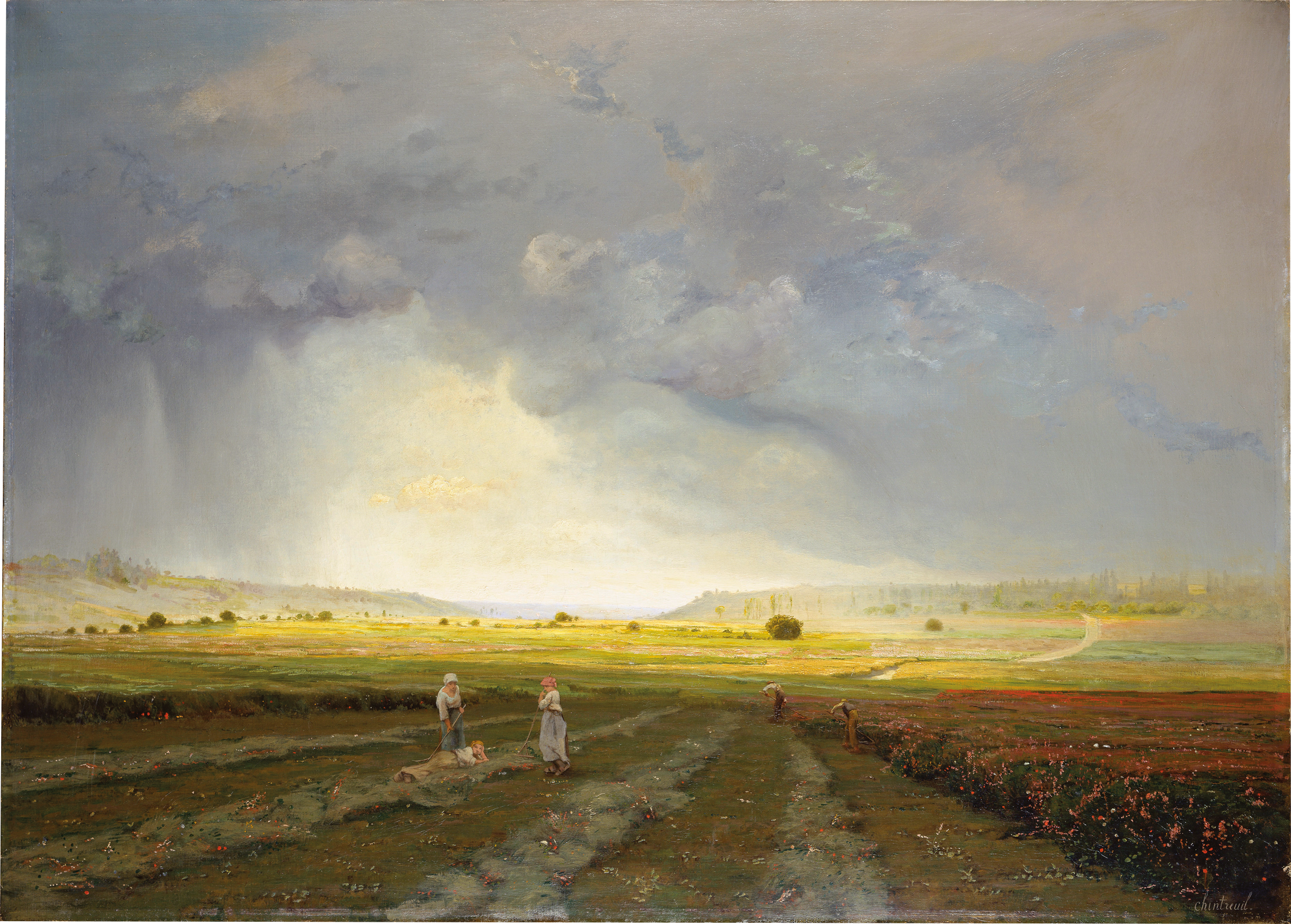
l'Ondée, 1868, Städel, Frankfurt

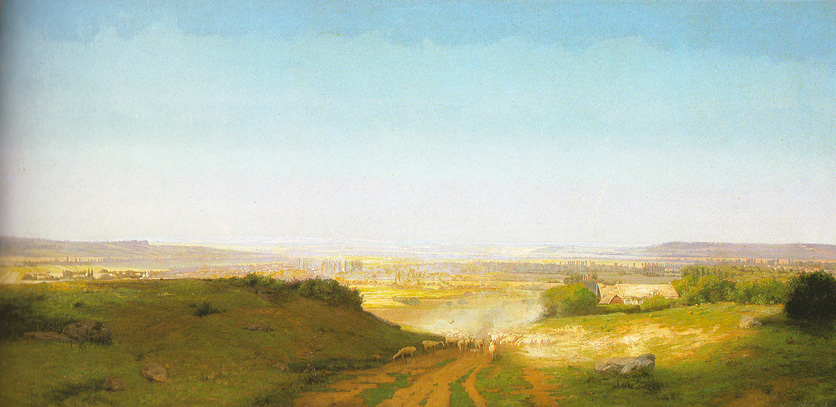
l'Espace, 1869, Musée d'Orsay

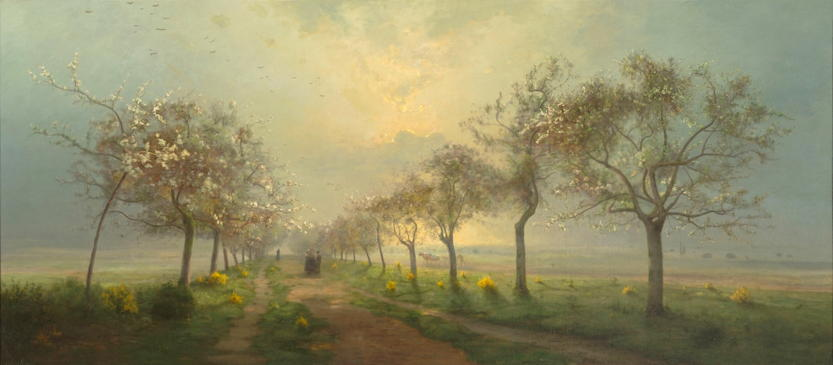
Pommiers et genêts en fleur, 1872, Musée d'Orsay

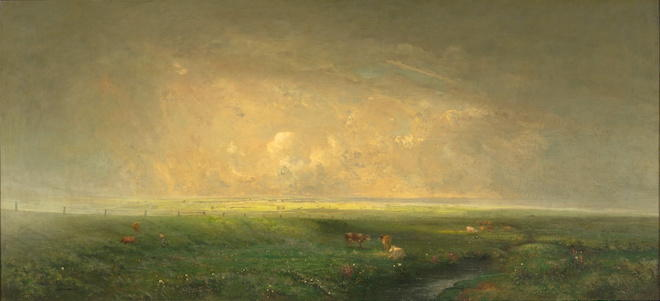
Pluie et soleil, 1873, Musée d'Orsay

== Death ==
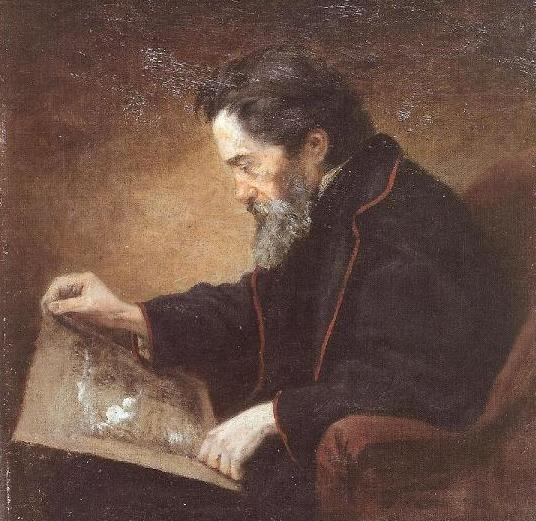
Jean Desbrosses, portrait of Chintreuil, Musée Chintreuil, Pont-de-Vaux.

No specific diagnosis of Chintreuil's chronic ailment is given by contemporaries, but writing in 1905 Lanoë-Villène says he died of tuberculosis. In his 1881 monograph on Jean Desbrosses, Henriet describes the final days of Chintreuil in excruciating detail. As his condition worsened, his friend and doctor Aimé Martin advised a stay at one of the spas at Eaux-Bonnes, but the long trip exhausted him and he began to run a high fever. Having a horror of dying at the spa, Chintreuil told Desbrosses, "I want to die at La Tournelle."

This return was for Chintreuil a long torture and for Desbrosses a veritable Way of the Cross; he saw to everything, anticipated everything; always attentive and always smiling, he triumphed over all the ill will and indifference of hoteliers on the route. He feared, with each coughing attack, each lapse, that his patient would pass away in his arms.…Finally, Desbrosses had the consolation of bringing him back to La Tournelle. It was a hot and beautiful day at the beginning of July. Chintreuil was placed in full sunlight at the threshold of the glass door of the great room, on a mattress and cushions prepared in the garden to receive him, and he was finally able to run his dull eyes over the places he loved so much, and where he had spent his sweetest hours. "How beautiful," he said, "how beautiful!" His joy at returning home galvanized him for a while. The fragrant scents of his rose beds and the flowering meadows revived him. Twenty days later, it was all over!

On August 8, 1873, Chintreuil "died as he had lived, in the arms of Desbrosses." His last completed painting was Pluie et soleil (Rain and Sun), shown at the Paris Salon of 1873. Henriet believed that Chintreuil "exhaled his last breath in this heartbreaking elegy which, in the form of a struggle between the opposing forces of nature, sings the eternal duality of the human soul, whose brief joys are so quickly crossed by sorrow."

== Legacy ==
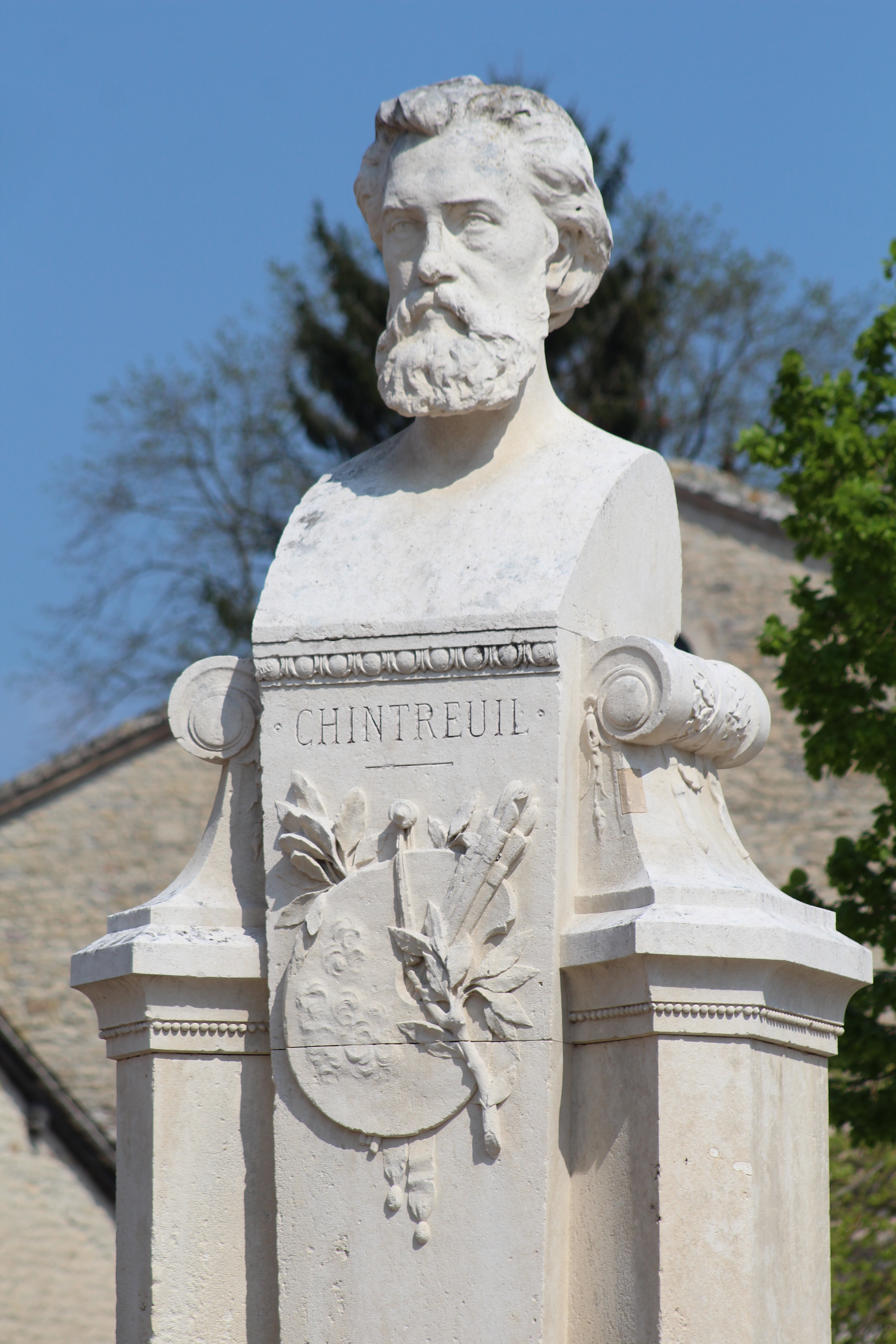
Chintreuil's monument in Pont-de-Vaux.

The year after Chintreuil's death, Jean Desbrosses, heir to his estate, organized a large retrospective exhibit of his work, with 228 paintings and 39 drawings shown at the Ecole des Beaux-Arts; it was highly unusual for an artist not associated with the school to be allowed to exhibit there, setting a precedent. Ernest Chesneau wrote: "We can say of Chintreuil, after having seen this exhibition, that he was and will remain in landscape painting the most fruitful trailblazer of this century. He far surpassed his illustrious master, Corot…." Along with a catalogue of the exhibition, Desbrosses also published the elaborately illustrated La vie et l'oeuvre de Chintreuil (1874), with essays and an annotated list of over 500 works; the inclusion in the book of over 150 etchings of Chinrtreuil's work, many especially commissioned for the volume, was a publishing innovation for its time and resulted in one "of the most sumptuous illustrated catalogues that were ever seen." The following year, in 1875, an auction of Chintreuil's work was held at the Hôtel Drouot, offering 141 paintings and 57 drawings; it was a great success.

Desbrosses also worked to have a monument to Chintreuil erected in his hometown of Pont-de-Vaux; the inauguration of Chintreuil's bust (by Jean-Baptiste Baujault) in the Place des Cordeliers took place on May 5, 1879. Another elaborate monument was erected at Chintreuil's grave in Septeuil, sculpted by Louis-Charles Levé, in 1874; after Desbrosses died in 1906 he was buried alongside Chintreuil and a bronze plaque of his face was added next to that of Chintreuil. "The master and the disciple lie side by side, united forever in the stillness of death as they had been so long in the ties of life. Madame Desbrosses, wife of one and nurse of the other, is also buried there."

In 1884 the Louvre expressed an interest in purchasing the oeuvre suprême of Chintreuil, Pluie et soleil. Desbrosses donated the painting, free of charge. It is now in the Musée d'Orsay.

Desbrosses, having struggled alongside Chintreuil to create "from scratch a new, personal, original poetics," had his own successful career as an artist; this was seen by Henriet as another of Chintreuil's legacies. "These two hearts which beat incessantly in unison, these two souls which thought, which admired together, which continually penetrated each other, what an initiation for the young artist!"

During Chintreuil's lifetime, his friend Odilon Redon declared him the best French landscape artist, above Daubigny and even Corot, and after Chintreuil's death Redon pronounced him a genius who had lived a "retiring and austere life. Success never had for him that grand splendor cast upon talents more superficial and more manly…. His glory, like his work, appears slowly, faintly, and seems to fear the clamor of broad daylight. It thus moves forward without ostentation, the better to impose itself more enduringly and more surely."

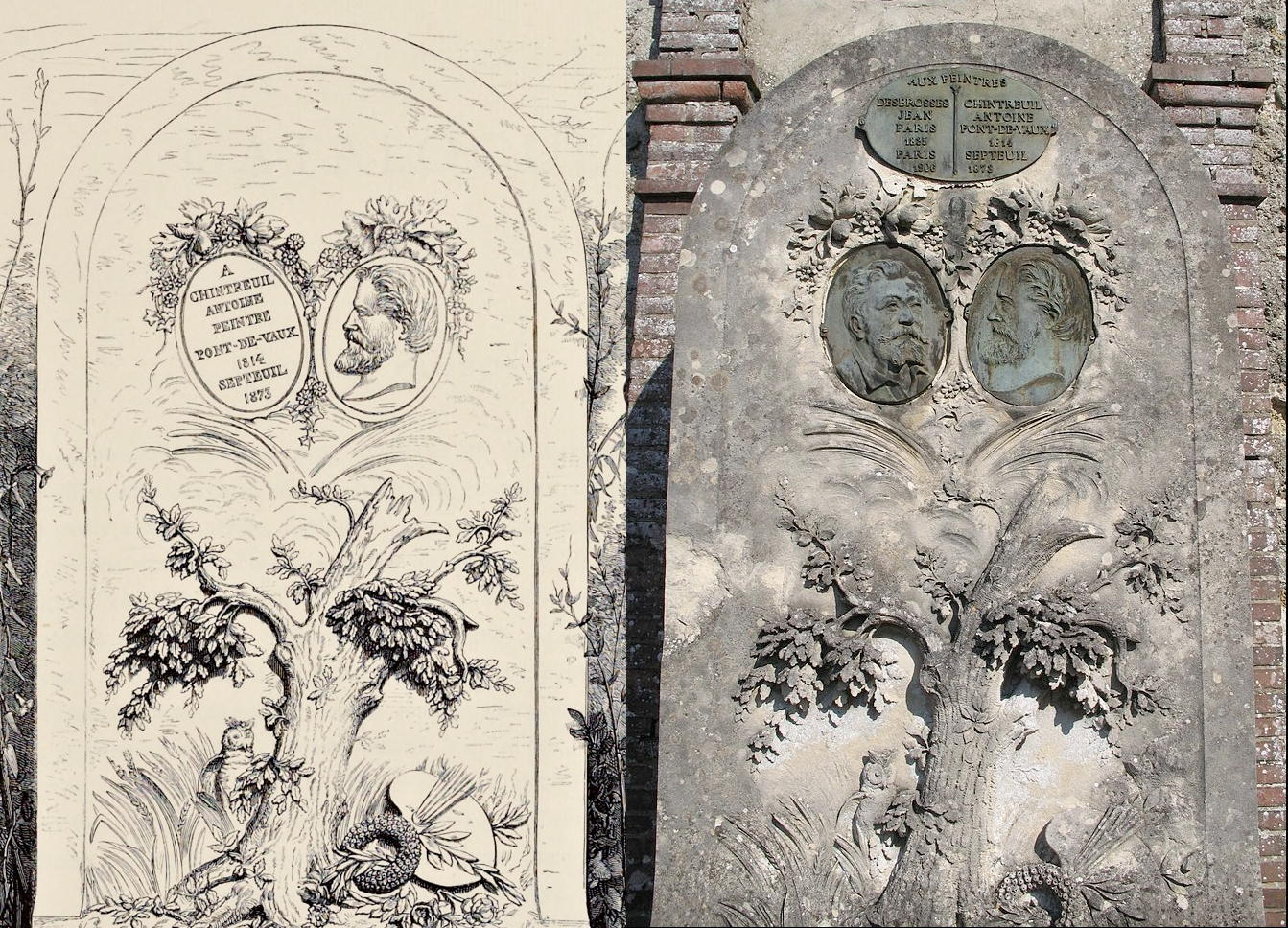
The grave monument of Antoine Chintreuil in Septeuil, France, as it first appeared in 1874 (drawing at left), and after Jean Desbrosses died in 1906 and was buried alongside Chintreuil (photo taken 2008).

In 1878, Émile Zola wrote of Chintreuil, "For a long time his talent was questioned or denied, but in reality it is considerable. Some of his paintings are magnificent: nature lives in them with its sounds, its scents, its play of light and shadow.…We can sense here a painter who strives to surpass the leaders of the landscape naturalist school and who, while remaining a faithful copyist of nature, tried to surprise it in special and difficult-to-capture moments."

In 1905, Georges Lanoë-Villène called Chintreuil the "great-grandfather of the Impressionists", but the art critic John House, writing a century later, would argue that Chintreuil's interests, as seen in the "very ambitious large-scale landscapes" of his final years,

are at the opposite end of the spectrum from the early work of the Impressionists, who in the same years were beginning to explore a calculatedly informal, seemingly casual vision of everyday light and weather. By contrast, Chintreuil's instants are dramatic and at times theatrical—a distillation, a condensation of visual experiences into a single heightened moment.

On the other hand, writes House, to compare Chrintreuil to Corot or the Barbizon painters, with whom his earlier works had only "broad similarities," brings home

just how difficult it is to classify Chintreuil's art within the normal paradigms of nineteenth-century French landscape painting. As early as 1861, Theophile Gautier noted his fascination with "the hazardous caprices, the bizarre attitudes, the risque effects" of nature. Terms like "romantic" or even "symbolist" spring to mind, but labels such as these divert attention from the real interest of Chintreuil's work. He was exploring this vision in the 1860s and early 1870s, seeking to take landscape painting in a very different direction from the "realist" and "naturalist" tendencies that were dominant in those years, and to use it as a vehicle for heightened poetic expression.

In works such as Un pré; le soleil chasse le brouillard, writes House, "the effect is so vivid—hallucinatory even—that…to twenty-first-century eyes, paintings like this trespass on the boundaries of bad taste." Nonetheless, in 2002 a large retrospective, Brumes et rosées: paysages d'Antoine Chintreuil 1814-1873, was exhibited at the Musée de Brou in Bourg-en-Bresse, with a catalogue that, as House wrote, immediately became "the standard work of reference on Chintreuil." More recently, in 2017, the Musée d'Art et d'Histoire de Meudon organized a show entitled Antoine Chintreuil (1814-1873): Rêveries d'un paysagiste solitaire. The idea of Chintreuil as a lonely landscape painter may have come from his reputation as an outsider and the fact that he never married or had children; but, from the camaraderie of his Bohemian days through his three decades of daily companionship with Desbrosses, Chintreuil was a singular artist, but not a solitary one.

== Sources ==
- Baldick, Robert (1961). The First Bohemian: The Life of Henry Murger, London: Hamish Hamilton, 1961.
- Beaulieu Caroline de. Peintres célèbres du XIXe siècle, vol. 2, Paris: Librairie Bloud et Barral, 1894; chapter "Antoine Chinteuil," pp. 273–304.
- Boime, Albert. "The Salon des Refuses and the Evolution of Modern Art", Art Quarterly 32 (Winter 1969), pp. 411–26.
- Catalogue illustré des Galeries des beaux-arts : contenant la liste complète et explicative des objets exposés, avec les prix de vente, Paris: Galeries des beaux-arts, boulevard Bonne-Nouvelle 20 et 22, 1843.
- Chesneau, Ernest. "L'Exposition des Oeuvres de Chintreuil", Revue de France, vol. X, May 1, 1874, pp. 250–253.
- Decour, Armand (1963). "Un grand peintre paysagiste du Mantois: Chintreuil" in Le Mantois 14 (Bulletin de la Société "Les Amis du Mantois," nouvelle série), Mantes-la-Jolie, Imprimerie Mantaise, 1963, p. 24-35.
- Decour, Armand (1973). "Les frères Desbrosses, peintres et graveurs du Mantois" in Le Mantois 23 (Bulletin de la Société "Les Amis du Mantois," nouvelle série), Mantes-la-Jolie: Imprimerie Mantaise, 1973, p. 3-16.
- Deslys, Charles. "Le petit pont du Grand Bois", Musée des familles, October 14, 1897 (reprinted from the issue of December 1882), pp. 648–651.
- Doiteau, Victor. "A la mémoire de Chintreuil", Comoedia, April 8, 1929, p 3.
- Dufay, C.-Jules. "Biographie: Chintreuil (Antoine)", Revue de la Société littéraire, historique et archéologique du département de l'Ain, 1875, pp. 43–52.
- Foog, P. "Jean Desbrosses", La Fantaisie artistique et littéraire: journal hebdomadaire, May 22, 1880, pp. 2–3.
- Hamerton, Philip Gilbert (1889). "Chintreuil" in Portfolio Papers, London: Seeley & Co., 1889, pp. 102–109.
- Henriet, Frédéric (1858). "Chintreuil" in l'Artiste, October 24, 1858; reprinted as a monograph, Esquisse biographique, Chintreuil, Paris: J. Claye, 1858.
- Henriet, Frédéric (1881). Jean Desbrosses: peintres contemporains, Paris: A. Levy, 1881.
- House, John (2002). "Antoine Chintreuil" (review of the catalogue and exhibition at Bourg-en-Bresse) in The Burlington Magazine, vol. 144, no. 1195 (October, 2002), pp. 647–648.
- Keller, A. "Béranger et le peintre Chintreuil", Bulletin de la Société historique d'Auteuil et de Passy. Paris: 1904, pp 258–259.
- La Fizelière, Albert de; Champfleury; Henriet, Frédéric; préface par Jean Desbrosses (1874). La vie et l'oeuvre de Chintreuil, Paris: Cadart, 1874.
- Lagrange, Léon. "Le Salon de 1864," Gazette des Beaux-Arts, vol. 17, July 1, 1864, pp 5–44.
- Lanoë-Villène, Georges. Histoire de l'école française de paysage depuis Chintreuil jusqu'à 1900, Nantes, Société nantaise d'éditions, 1905.
- Lelioux, Adrien François; Noël, Léon; and Nadar (1862). Histoire de Mürger: pour a l'histoire de la vraie Bohéme, par Trois Buveurs d'Eau, Paris: Collection Hetzel; includes letters by Murger with mentions of Chintreuil.
- Murger, Henri (1930). Latin Quarter, English translation by Elizabeth Ward Hugus of Scénes de la vie de bohème, New York: Dodd, Mead & Company, 1930.
- Montorgueil, Georges (pseudonym of Octave Lebesgue) (1906). "Desbrosses et Chintreuil", Le Mois littéraire et pittoresque, Paris: Maison de la Bonne Presse, January, 1906, pp. 537–545.
- Montorgueil, Georges (1928). Henry Murger, romancier de la Bohème, Paris: Bernard Grasset, 1928.
- Redon, Odilon (1868). "Salon de 1868", La Gironde, May 19, 1868. Reprinted in Odilon Redon, Critiques d'art, Bordeaux: William Blake & Co., 1987.
- Redon, Odilon (1922). A soi-même: journal, 1867-1915: notes sur la vie, l'art et les artistes, Paris: H. Fleury, 1922. English translation by Mira Jacob and Jeanne L. Wasserman, To myself: notes on life, art, and artists, New York: G. Braziller, 1986.
- Zola, Émile (1878), "L’École française de Peinture à l’Exposition de 1878," originally published in Le Messager de l’Europe, July, 1878 (in Russian), translated to French by Hemmings and Niess and published in Émile Zola, Salons, Geneva: E. Droz, 1959, p. 199-222; quoted by Decour (1963).

=== Exhibition and auction catalogues (chronological) ===
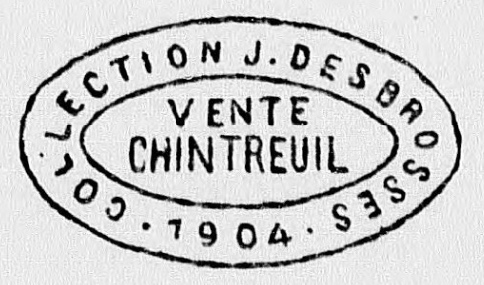
From the catalogue for the 1905 auction at the Hôtel Drouot: "All paintings and studies included in the sale of the Jean Desbrosses Collection bear this wax seal on the back on the frame."

- 1874: Tableaux, Études et Dessins de Chintreuil exposés a l'École des Beaux-Arts du 25 avril au 15 mai 1874 (exhibition catalogue), Paris: J. Claye, 1874.
- 1875: Catalogue de Tableaux, Études et Dessins d'après Nature par Chintreuil, auction at the Hôtel Drouot, Paris, February 4–5, 1875.
- 1905: Tableaux et études par A. Chintreuil composant la Collection de M. Jean Desbrosses, catalogue for the auction at the Hôtel Drouot, Paris, February 9, 1905.
- 1907: Catalogue des tableaux, études, esquisses, dessins, par A. Chintreuil...et dessins par divers artistes...dépendant de la succession de Jean Desbrosses, estate auction at the Hôtel Drouot, Paris, February 15, 1907.
- 1929: Exposition de peintures et dessins par Ant. Chintreuil, 1814-1873, du 8 au 30 avril 1929, Paris: Galerie Lorenceau, 1929; catalogue preface by Victor Doiteau published as "A la mémoire de Chintreuil" in Comoedia, April 8, 1929, p 3.
- 1973: Baudson, Françoise, et al. Antoine Chintreuil, Le Livre du Centenaire, 1873-1973: Catalogue de l'exposition organisée par les villes de Bourg-en-Bresse et de Pont-de-Vaux, Bourg-en-Bresse: Musée de Brou, 1973.
- 2002: Fossier, François, et al. Brumes et rosées: paysages d'Antoine Chintreuil 1814-1873, catalogue for concurrent exhibitions at the Musée Chintreuil and the Musée de Brou, June–September, 2002; includes extant correspondence of Chintreuil; Paris: Réunion des musées nationaux, 2002.
- 2017: Antoine Chintreuil (1814-1873): Rêveries d'un paysagiste solitaire, catalogue of the exhibition at the Musée d'Art et d'Histoire de Meudon, 2017.
