= Anne Simon (comics) =

French illustrator (born 1980)

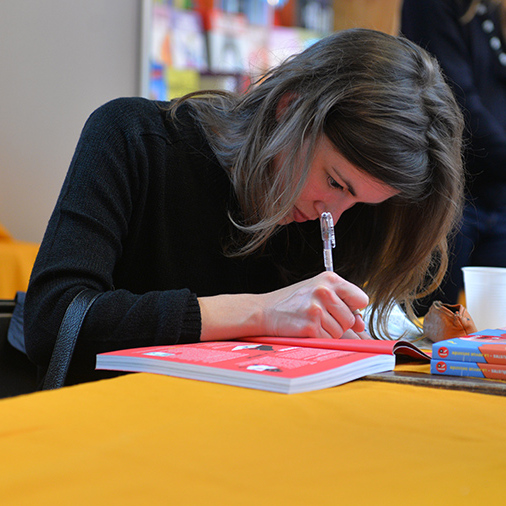
Anne Simon at QBD2015

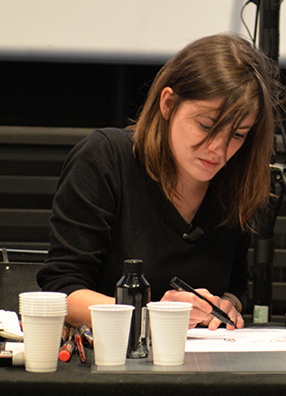
Anne Simon at FIBD2015

Anne Simon (born 21 July 1980) is a French bande dessinée author and illustrator. In 2004, she received the Young Talent prize at the Angoulême International Comics Festival.

== Biography ==
Anne Simon was born in 1980, in La Crèche, Deux-Sèvres, France.

She studied fine arts at the École supérieure de l'image in Angoulême and decorative arts at the École nationale supérieure des arts décoratifs in Paris. She participated in the creation of the magazine Dopututto and the Misma Editions where she developed her series Les Contes du Marylène, which includes La Geste d'Aglaé, Cixitite Impératrice, and Boris l'Enfant Patate.

She published her first comic strip, Perséphone aux enfers (Persephone in the Underworld) (Michel Lagarde) in 2006. She published three illustrated graphic biographies at Dargaud: Freud, Marx, and Einstein in collaboration with the screenwriter Corinne Maier. Simon also works as an illustrator for the press and children's publishing. In 2020, volume 4 of Gousse & Gigot was published and the album was selected for the 2021 Angoulême International Comics Festival.

== Awards and honours ==
- First winner of the Young Talents competition at the 2004 Angoulême International Comics Festival.

== Selected works ==
=== Comic book albums ===
- Pour l’honneur d’un coureur, volume 1 of the series Les petites prouesses de Clara Pilpoile, Dargaud, (coll. Poisson Pilote), 2007
- Viva Las Vegas, volume 2 of the series Les petites prouesses de Clara Pilpoile, Dargaud, (coll. Poisson Pilote), 2008
- Pignolo le bonobo, in Vive la politique, collective work, Dargaud, (coll. Poisson Pilote), 2006
- Perséphone aux Enfers, Michel Lagarde, 2006
- Terriens, collective work, Les 400 coups, 2006
- Rognure, non-commercial product produced for the 24 hours of Angoulême comics, Misma, 2008
- Tranches napolitaines, Dargaud, 2010
- Freud, scenario by Corinne Maier, Dargaud, 2011
- Les Exilés du Marylène, vol. 1 : La Geste d'Aglaé, Misma, 2012, 120 p. ISBN 978-2-916254-20-3
- Marx, scenario by Corinne Maier, Dargaud, 2013
- Les Exilés du Marylène, vol. 2 : Cixtite impératrice, Misma, 2014, 80 p. ISBN 978-2-916254-39-5
- Einstein, scenario by Corinne Maier, Dargaud, 2015
- Encaisser !, Casterman, 2016
- Lorsque je regarde les enfants des autres, Cambourakis, 2016
- Les Exilés du Marylène, vol. 3 : Boris, l'enfant patate, Misma, 2018]
- ABCD de la Typographie (participation), scenario by David Rault, Gallimard, 2018
- Les Exilés du Marylène, vol. 4 : Gousse et Gigot, éd. Misma, January 2020
- Histoire dessinée de la France vol. 9 : En âge florissant. De la Renaissance à la Réforme, co-édition of Editions La Découverte and the Revue Dessinée / November 2020, with Pascal Brioist
- Les Représentants, dessin collectif avec David Prudhomme, Alfred, and Sébastien Vassant, scenario by Vincent Farasse, Virages graphiques, 2022
- Les Exilés du Marylène, vol. 5 : L'Institut des benjamines, éd. Misma, 2022 - Official selection of Festival d'Angoulême 2023
- Les Exilés du Marylène, vol. 6 : "Henry, James et les autres", 2024

=== Illustrator ===
- Sorcières en colère, author: Fanny Joly, Gallimard, collection Folio Cadet, 2006
- La Conversation, author: Olivier Abel, Gallimard Jeunesse, collection Chouette penser, 2006
- Ma langue à toutes les sauces, author: Christine Beiger, Éditions Albin Michel, collection Humour en mots, 2006 ISBN 2-226-14932-5
- Nous, les 14-17 ans, author: Anne-Marie Thomazeau, La Martinière jeunesse, Collection Hydrogène, 2006
- Comment l'homme a compris d'où viennent les bébés, author: Juliette Nouel-Rénier, Gallimard Jeunesse, collection La connaissance est une aventure, 2007 ISBN 978-2-07-057881-8
- Le maléfice égyptien, author: Lorris Murail, Gallimard, collection Folio Junior histoires courtes, 2007 ISBN 978-2-07-061082-2
- [Comment l’homme a compris que le singe est son cousin, author: Juliette Nouel-Rénier and Pascal Picq, Gallimard Jeunesse, Collection La connaissance est une aventure, 2007
- Où sont passés les princes charmants ?, author: Rosalinde Bonnet, Milan, Collection Milan Poche Cadet, 2007 ISBN 2-7459-2695-0
- Comment l'homme a compris que le climat se réchauffe, author: Juliette Nouel-Rénier, Gallimard Jeunesse, collection La connaissance est une aventure, 2008
- Comment l'homme a compris que les dinosaures ont régné sur Terre, author: Juliette Nouel-Rénier, Gallimard Jeunesse, collection La connaissance est une aventure, 2008
- Je vais au théâtre voir le monde, author: Jean-Pierre Sarrazac, Gallimard Jeunesse, collection Chouette penser, 2008
- Pourquoi mon chien déchiquette mes chaussettes?, author: Caroline Laffon and Martine Laffon, La Martinière jeunesse, 2008
- Sagesses et malices de Yoshua, L'homme qui se disait le fils de Dieu, author: Oscar Brenifier, Albin Michel jeunesse, collection Sagesses et Malices, 2009 ISBN 2-226-18950-5
- Céleste, ma planète, author: Timothée de Fombelle, Je bouquine number 285, November 2007
