= Jean-Baptiste Baujault =

French sculptor

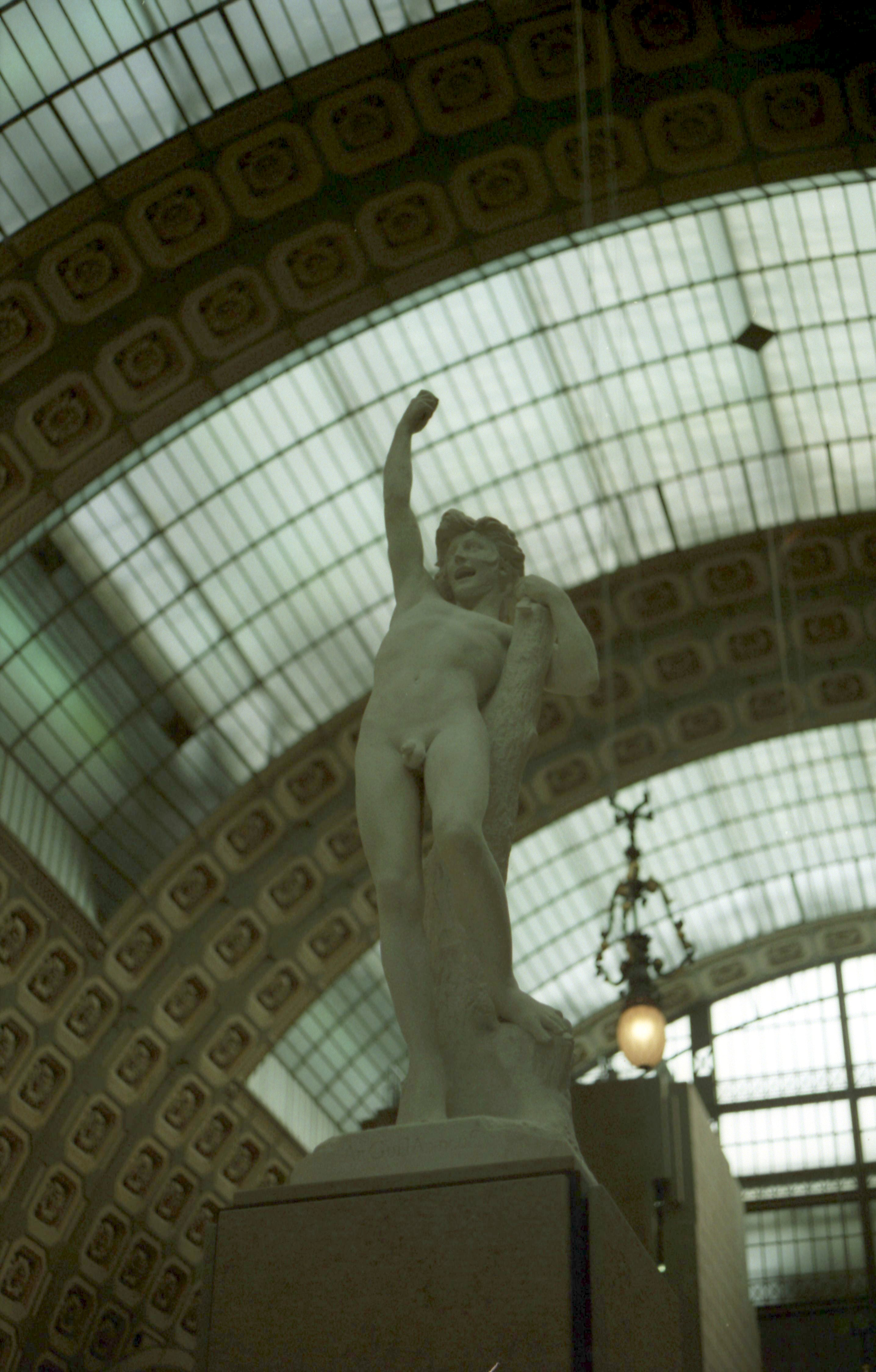
Jeune Gaulois or Au gui l'an neuf !, marble, 1870–1875, Paris, Musée d'Orsay

Jean-Baptiste Baujault (born 19 April 1828 in La Crèche, Deux-Sèvres, died in 1899) was a French sculptor.

== Biography ==
The marble statue named Jeune Gaulois, kept at the Musée d'Orsay in Paris belongs to the series of Gauls which occupied much the second half of the 19th century. The mistletoe and the sickle have disappeared.

He participated in the Prix de Rome, but didn't win. He lived and worked in Paris, at Montparnasse and Montmartre, but went into exile in the region of Nantes during the 1870 War.

He held the Légion d'Honneur.

== Main works ==
- Premier Miroir, 1873, marble, Niort, Musée Bernard d'Agesci
- Jeune Gaulois or Au gui l'an neuf!, 1870–1875, marble, Paris, Musée d'Orsay
- Bust of Antoine Chintreuil, 1879, public monument, Septeuil, France
