= La Crèche =

- Commune
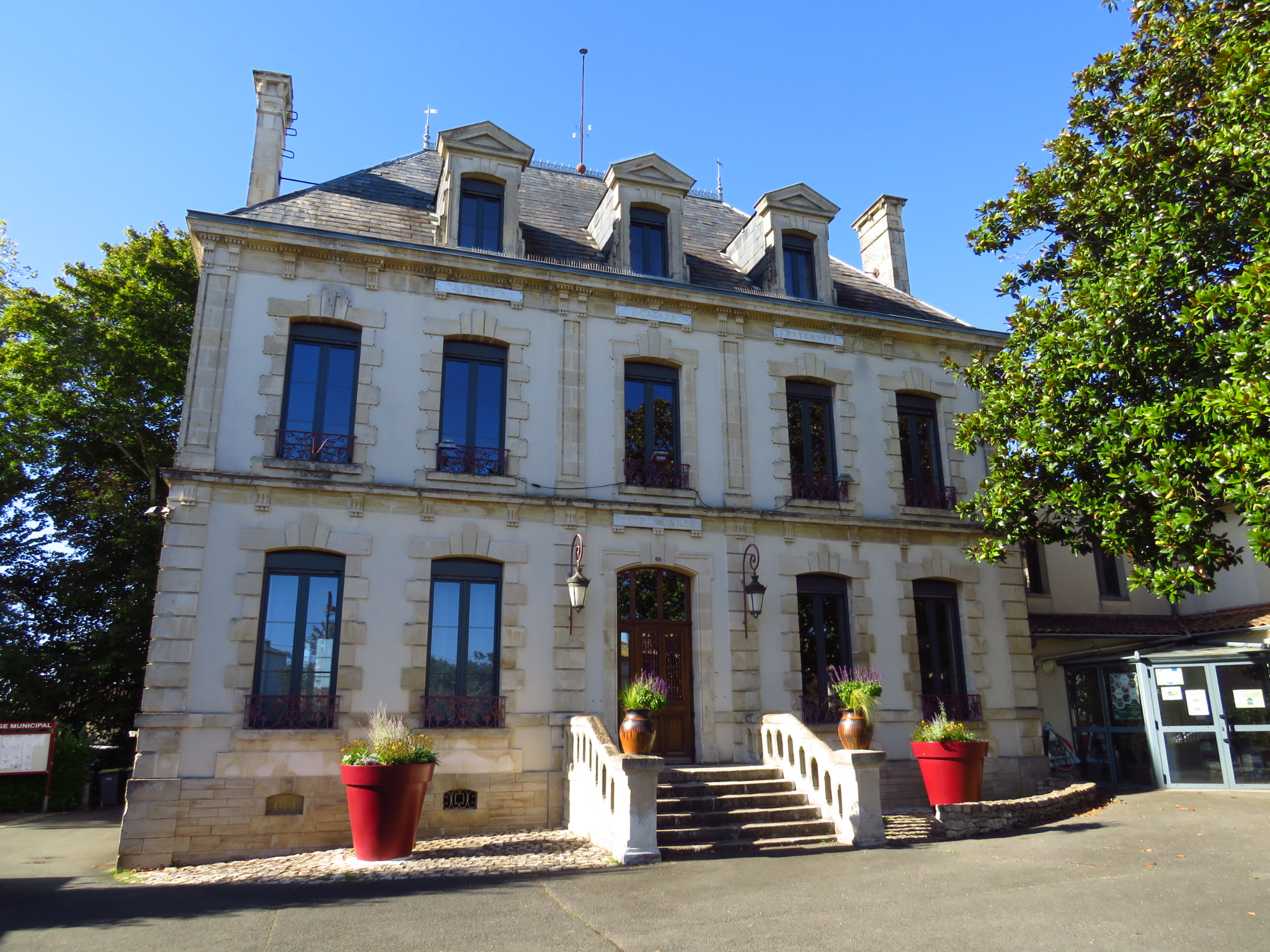
- Town hall of La Crèche
- Location of La Crèche
- Location within France Location within Nouvelle-Aquitaine
- Coordinates: 46°21′42″N 0°17′56″W
- Country: France
- Region: Nouvelle-Aquitaine
- Department: Deux-Sèvres
- Arrondissement: Niort
- Canton: Saint-Maixent-l'École

Government
  - Mayor (2020–2026): Laetitia Hamot
- Area^{1}: 34.5 km^{2} (13.3 sq mi)
- Elevation: 67 m (220 ft)
- Highest elevation: 127 m (417 ft)
- Lowest elevation: 35 m (115 ft)
- Population (2023): 5,662
  - Density: 164/km^{2} (425/sq mi)
- Time zone: UTC+01:00 (CET)
  - Summer (DST): UTC+02:00 (CEST)
- INSEE/Postal code: 79048 /79260
- ^{1} French Land Register data, which excludes lakes, ponds, glaciers > 1 km^{2} (0.386 sq mi or 247 acres) and river estuaries.

La Crèche (French pronunciation: [la kʁɛʃ]) is a commune in the Deux-Sèvres department in the Nouvelle-Aquitaine region in western France. It was created in 1965 by the merger of two former communes: Breloux-la-Crèche and Chavagne.

== Population ==
Historical population
Year	Pop.	±% p.a.
1968	2,806	—
1975	3,181	+1.81%
1982	4,213	+4.10%
1990	4,467	+0.73%
1999	4,684	+0.53%
2007	5,374	+1.73%
2012	5,475	+0.37%
2017	5,635	+0.58%
2023	5,662	+0.08%
Source: INSEE

== People from La Crèche ==
- Jean-Baptiste Baujault, sculptor
- Anne Simon (comics) (born 1980), author and illustrator

== See also ==
- Communes of the Deux-Sèvres department
