= Charles-Émile-Callande de Champmartin =

French painter (1797–1883)

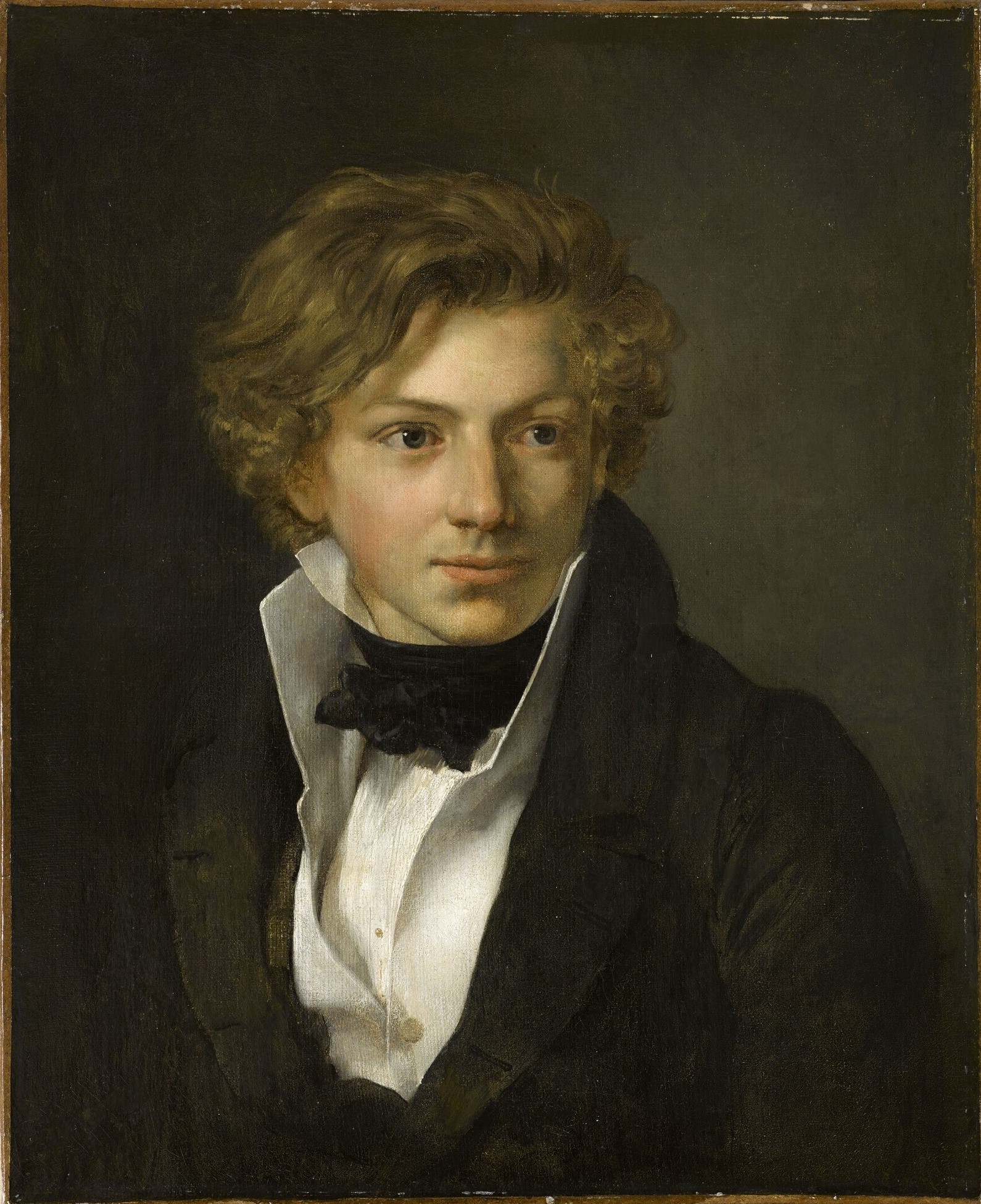
- Portrait by Jules Coignet, 1817
- Born: 1797; Bourges, France
- Died: 1883 (aged 85–86); Paris, France
- Movement: Orientalist

Charles-Émile-Callande de Champmartin (1797 in Bourges – 1883 in Paris) was a French painter, noted for his Orientalist works.

== Life and career ==
The son of a couple of freeholders, Jean Callande and Gabrielle Lemonnier, Charles-Émile Callande de Champmartin began exhibiting at the Salon in 1819. He owes his reputation to his many portraits and religious paintings, treated with a brush of romantic sensitivity. He was one of the early painters to travel to the Middle East and produce paintings with Orientalist themes. His is known for his numerous portraits, historical and religious paintings and Orientalist works, all of which were very popular during his lifetime.

He was a friend and pupil of Eugène Delacroix, of whom he made a portrait (1840), now preserved in Paris at the Musée Carnavalet. A portrait of Eugène Sue is in the Magnin museum in Dijon with three other paintings by the same author. Five paintings are at the Louvre Museum in Paris and four others at the National Museum of the Castles of Versailles and Trianon, including a portrait of Marshal Clausel (1835).

== Select list of paintings ==
- Massacre of the Janissaries, 1827 (Rochefort Museum, Rochefort, France)
- Portrait of Eugene Sue, oil on canvas
- The Sacrifice of Abraham
- Dog keeping a dead rabbit
- Portrait of lady in flower cap
- Portrait of Juliette Drouet as a woman of Smyrna, 1827.
- Portrait of Paul-Émile Botta, orientalist, 1840, oil on canvas, now in the Louvre

== Gallery ==
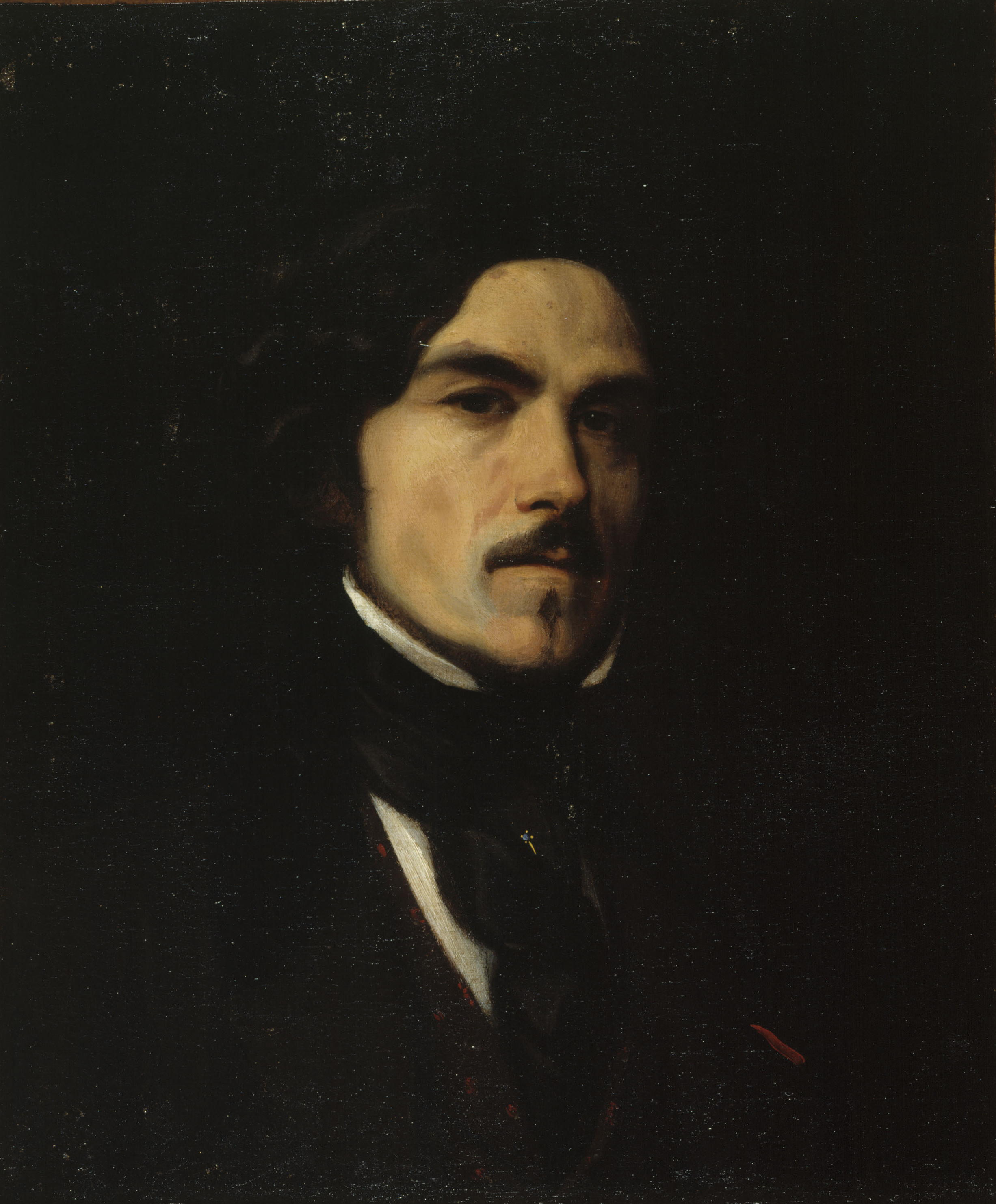
Portrait of Eugène Delacroix, c. 1840

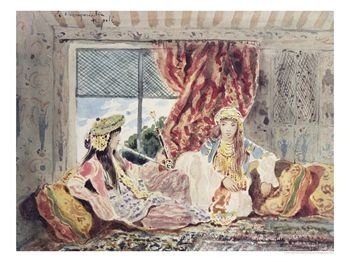
Harem in Tripoli

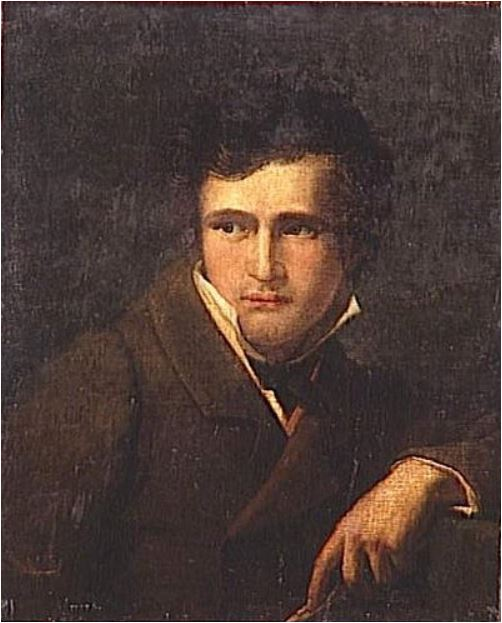
Portrait of Jacques Fédel

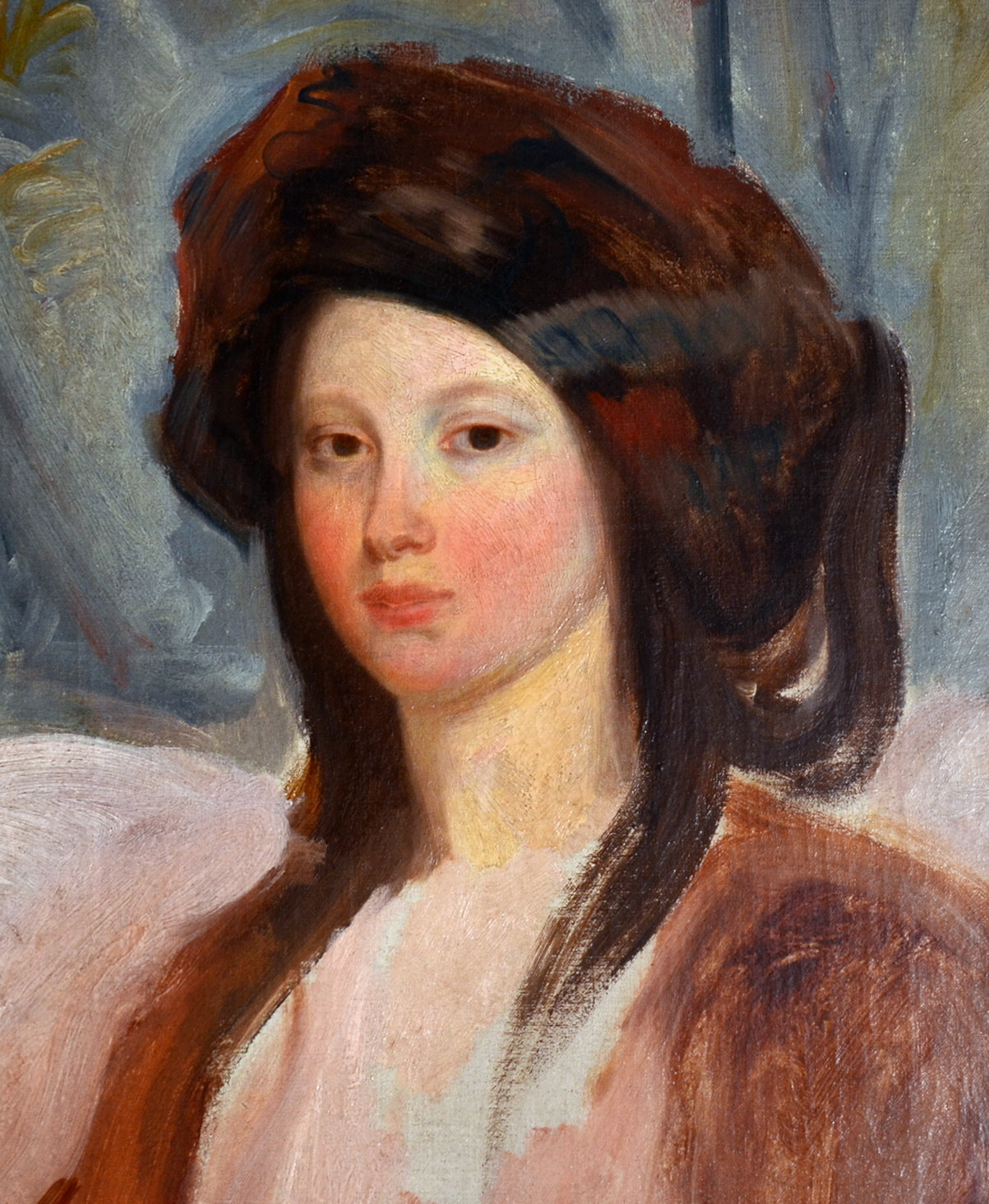
Portrait of Juliette Drouet

== See also ==
- List of Orientalist artists
- Orientalism
