= Ernest Chesneau =

French art historian and critic (1833–1890)

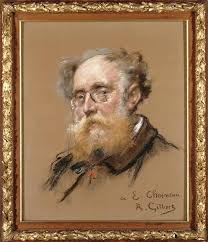
Portrait of Ernest Chesneau.jpg

Ernest Chesneau (9 April 1833 – 24 February 1890) was a French art historian and critic.

== Selected publications ==
- Le Mouvement moderne en peinture. Decamps, Paris, Panckoucke, 1861;
- La Peinture française au XIX^{e} siècle : les chefs d’école, Paris, Didier, 1862;
- L’Art dans les résidences impériales. Compiègne, Paris, E. Panckoucke, 1863;
- L’Art et les artistes modernes en France et en Angleterre, Paris, Didier, 1864;
- Mme de La Vallière (1644-1710), Paris, Blaisot, 1864;
- Les Nations rivales dans l’art : peinture, sculpture; L’art japonais; De l’Influence des expositions internationales sur l’avenir de l’art, Paris, Didier, 1868;
- Notice sur G. Régamey, Paris, Librairie de l’art, 1879, 1 vol. (53 p.) : fig.; gr. in-8;
- Peintres et statuaires romantiques, Paris, Charavay frères, 1880;
- Constant Dutilleux, 1807-1865, Paris, 1880, in-8°;
- Le Statuaire J.-B. Carpeaux : sa vie et son œuvre, Paris, A. Quentin, 1880, in-8°, VIII-286 p., pl., fig. et portrait.
