= 2024 in comics =

Notable events of 2024 in comics.

== Events ==
=== January ===
- January: Jan Vriends officially becomes the new Stripmaker des Vaderlands (Comic Artist of the Mother Country) in the Netherlands, whose task is to promote the comics medium.
- January 1: The classic French comic series Bécassine (originally created by Émile-Joseph Pinchon) enters public domain.
- January 10: The first issue of Marvel's Ultimate Spider-Man by Jonathan Hickman and Marco Checchetto is published. This version of Spider-Man is set on Earth-6160 and follows a 35-year-old Peter Parker, who is married to Mary Jane Watson and has two children with her and was not bitten by the radioactive spider when he was teenager, as he deals with his new-found heroic responsibilities.
- January 15: Dutch comic artist Wilma van den Bosch wins the annual Stripschapprijs. De Inktpot, a Utrecht collective of comics creators, receives the annual P. Hans Frankfurtherprijs. The ceremony takes place on March 17.
- January 24: Belgian publishing company Plantyn announces that in the fall all their children's magazines, namely Zonneland, Zonnekind, Zonnestraal, Doremi and Doremini will cease to be printed on paper. Zonneland in particular was Belgium's oldest still-running children's magazine and the oldest to contain comics.
- January 25: Posy Simmonds receives the career award Grand Prix de la ville d'Angoulême at the Angoulême International Comics Festival, which marks the first time in the festival's history that a British comic artist has been awarded this prize.

=== March ===
- March 15: Publishing company Standaard Uitgeverij sends a letter to all surviving former artists of Willy Vandersteen's studio, informing them that they are no longer allowed to make or sign drawings with the Suske en Wiske characters for fans or at book signings, without the publisher's permission. The letter was made public and caused a lot of controversy, not only among the general audience, but also the veteran artists themselves. Standaard Uitgeverij eventually reacted and acknowledged miscommunication on their part. The artists are still allowed to sign books they have drawn themselves, but no longer drawings on loose pieces of paper.

=== April ===
- April 9: A rare copy of the very first Superman issue (Action Comics 1) sells for $6 million at an auction, breaking a record as the most expensive sale of a comic book ever.

=== May ===
- May 20: Russell Myers, best known for the newspaper gag comic Broom-Hilda, enters the Guinness Book of World Records with the title longest-running daily cartoon strip by a single author.
- May 24: The Belgian capital Brussels recognizes comics as intangible cultural heritage.
- May 28: Chris Ware is honoured as a Chevalier de l'Ordre des Arts et de Lettres.

=== September ===
- September 3: A comic mural devoted to Gabrielle Vincent's Ernest et Célestine is inaugurated in Brussels as part of the Brussels' Comic Book Route.
- September 6: Brecht Evens receives the comics award Bronzen Adhemar.
- September 7: In Mouscron, Belgium, a comic mural is inaugurated, devoted to Marcel Marlier's series Martine.
- September 24: In Turnhout, Belgium, a comic mural, designed by Jan Bosschaert, is inaugurated, depicting characters by all past Bronzen Adhemar winners since 1977. It is also the largest comic mural of Belgium.
- September 28: The Marc Sleen Foundation announces that, as of January 1, 2025, all comics by Marc Sleen will enter public domain prematurely.

=== October ===
- October 31: After criticism of supposed racial and sexist stereotyping in the latest Spirou et Fantasio album, Spirou et la Gorgone Bleue, drawn by Dany, publishing company Dupuis orders all copies to be retrieved from the market.

== Deaths ==
=== January ===
- January 1: David Kunzle, American comic historian, writer and journalist (author of the books The Early Comic Strip, The History of the Comic Strip in the 19th Century, Rebirth of the English Comic Strip, Father of the Comic Strip Rodolphe Töpffer), dies at age 87.
- January 2: Attila Futaki, Hungarian comic artist and art director of the Hungarian comic magazine Roham, dies at age 29.
- January 3: Jan Smet, Belgian archivist, comic journalist (chief editor of the comic information magazine Stripgids), historian and author (co-wrote a 1985 biography about Marc Sleen, author of the book Duizend Bommen en Castraten. Censuur in de Strip, about censorship in comics), dies at age 78.
- January 10: Walmir Amaral, Brazilian comic artist (O Vingador, Zhor, O Atlanta, Zorro, Alex e Cris, made local versions of The Phantom, continued Aventuras do Anjo), dies at age 84.
- January 12: Haruo Takahashi, Japanese manga artist (Iwayuru Hitotsu no Chō-san Shugi), dies at age 76.
- January 18: Trini Tinturé, Spanish comic artist and illustrator (Emma es Encantadora, Oh, Tinker, Curly, Biggi, Micky, Siska), dies at age 88.
- January 19: Marti Riera, A.K.A. Marti, Spanish comic artist (Taxista, Doctor Vértigo), dies at age 68 or 69.
- January 20: Alain De Kuyssche, Belgian journalist, comics writer (Didi, Germain et nous..., Gaston), biographer (wrote biographical books about Jacques Martin, Dino Attanasio, Eddy Paape and Raoul Cauvin) and chief editor of Spirou (1978–1982), dies at age 77.
- January 28: Jean-François Debaty, A.K.A. Schmurl, Belgian comic writer (Arpo) and colorist (Yvain et Yvon, Jordan), dies at age 59.
- January 29: Hinako Ashihara, Japanese manga writer and artist (Forbidden Dance, Sand Chronicles, Sexy Tanaka-san), dies at age 50.

=== February ===
- February 5:
  - José Delbo, Argentine comics artist (drew for the Wonder Woman, The Transformers and Batgirl series, celebrity comics based on The Monkees and a Yellow Submarine comic book adaptation), dies at age 90.
  - Walter van den Broeck, Belgian playwright and comics writer (wrote De Tranen van Turnhout, illustrated by Reinhart Croon), dies at age 82.
- February 7: Alfredo Castelli, Italian comics writer (Martin Mystère, Mister No, Dylan Dog, Zagor), dies at age 76.
- February 10:
  - Jack Higgins, American editorial cartoonist, dies at age 69.
  - Paul Neary, British comic writer and artist (Madman), inker (Ultimates) and chief editor of Marvel UK, dies at age 74.
- February 15: Enrique Badía Romero, Spanish comic artist (AXA, continued Modesty Blaise, assisted on Rahan), dies at age 93.
- February 24:
  - Benoît van Innis, Belgian cartoonist, painter and illustrator (published in The New Yorker, among other magazines), dies at age 63.
  - Ramona Fradon, American comics artist (Adventure Comics, Brenda Starr, Reporter, co-creator of Metamorpho and Fire), dies at age 97.

=== March ===
- March 1:
  - Akira Toriyama, Japanese manga artist (Dr. Slump, Dragon Ball), dies at age 68.
  - Chance Browne, American comic writer and artist (continued Hi and Lois), dies at age 75.
- March 5: Jos Looman, Dutch illustrator and comic artist (worked for Pep), dies at age 82.
- March 6: Yū Asai, manga creator and wife of manga creator Motoyuki Asai, dies in a car accident.
- March 7: Stéphane Rosse, French comic writer (Naisen Kanssa) and artist (Rocky), dies at age 61.
- March 10: Roger Noel Cook, British comics writer (Doctor Who, Popeye, Tom and Jerry), dies at age 77.
- March 14: Marty Elkin, American comic artist (Haunted Horror, Horrific, Strange Tales, Love Romances), dies at age 96.
- March 22:
  - Laurent de Brunhoff, French children's book writer and illustrator (continued Babar the Elephant), dies at age 98.
  - Dave Darrigo, Canadian comic book writer (Wordsmith, Joe Shuster Awards Hall of Fame 2010 inductee) dies at age 69.
- March 24: Don Wright, American cartoonist, dies at age 90.
- March 25:
  - Alejandro Fried, Uruguayan-Argentine animator and comic artist (Stone, Rock Stories, Hanna-Barbera comics), dies at age 58.
  - Enrique Ventura, Spanish comics artist (Grouñidos en El Desierto), dies at age 77.
- March 27:
  - James A. Moore, American novelist, role-playing game author and comic writer (Hellraiser, Nocturnals), dies at age 58.
  - Robert Beerbohm, American comic book retailer (Comics and Comix, Best of Two Worlds, The Funny Pages, Best Comics) and historian (did research after 19th-century comics, particularly the work of Rodolphe Töpffer), dies at age 71.
  - M.D. Bright, American comic book artist (Iron Man, Green Lantern, Icon, Quantum and Woody), dies at age 68.

=== April ===
- April 1: Ed Piskor, American comic writer and artist (Hip Hop Family Tree, Wizzywig, Red Room, worked on X-Men stories), dies at age 41.
- April 6: Ziraldo, Brazilian painter, journalist and comic writer & artist (Turma do Pererê, O Menino Maluquinho), dies at age 92.
- April 10: Trina Robbins, American comic writer, artist (It Ain't Me Babe, Wimmen's Comix, scripted stories for Wonder Woman and GoGirl!), author ((co)-wrote Women and the Comics, A Century of Women Cartoonists, The Great Women Superheroes, From Girls to Grrrlz: A History of Women's Comics from Teens to Zines, The Great Women Cartoonists, Pretty in Ink) and activist (co-founder of Friends of Lulu), dies at age 85.

=== May ===
- May 2: Walter Hanel, German editorial cartoonist, dies at age 93.
- May 5: Fred Dewilde, French comic artist (Mon Bataclan, La Morsure), dies at age 58.
- May 14: Don Perlin, American comics artist (Werewolf by Night, ghosted The Spirit, continued Ghost Rider, co-creator of Moon Knight and Bloodshot), dies at age 94.
- May 16: June Mendoza A.K.A. Chris Garvey, Australian painter and comic artist (drew comics for K.G. Murray Publishing, Gem Comics and Girl), dies at age 99.
- May 17: Peter Bennett, American art director and comic book artist (SpongeBob SquarePants), dies at age 56.
- May 23: Petra Coria, Spanish-Belgian colorist (XIII) and wife of William Vance, dies at age 87.
- May 25: Carlo J. Caparas, Filipino comic artist (Bakekang, Kamandag), dies at age 80.
- Specific date in May unknown: Jon Haward, British comic artist (The Hell Crew), dies at age 58 or 59.

=== June ===
- June 1: John Kenneth Adcock, Canadian cartoonist, illustrator and comics scholar (creator of the comics blog Yesterday's Papers, devoted to 19th-century and early 20th-century comics), dies at age 74.
- June 6: José Ramon Bernado, Spanish comic artist (Disney comics), dies at age 59.
- June 8:
  - Ben Potter, AKA Comicstorian, American YouTuber (channel dedicated to comic book reviews and other comic-related videos) and comic book writer (Bloodshot), dies at age 40.
  - Nanae Sasaya, Japanese manga artist (Year 24 Group), dies at age 74.
- June 16: Étienne Willem, Belgian comic artist (Vieille Bruyère et Bas de Soie, L'Épée d'Ardenois, Les Ailes du Singe, La Fille de l'Exposition Universelle, Les Artilleuses, Le Paris des Merveilles), commits suicide at age 51.
- June 19: Jan Cremer, Dutch novelist and comic strip writer (New Comic Strip Scandal 000), dies at age 84.
- June 20:
  - Peter B. Gillis, American comic book writer (Strikeforce: Morituri, Captain America, Doctor Strange), dies at age 71.
  - Luc Mazel, Belgian comic artist and animator (Câline et Calebasse, Les Mousquetaires, Boulouboum et Guilliguilli, Les Paparazzi), dies at age 92.

=== July ===
- July 2: Wim Hazeu, Dutch poet and writer (wrote the 2012 biography about Marten Toonder), dies at age 84.
- July 8: Michael Zulli, American comic book artist (The Puma Blues, The Sandman, Taboo), dies at age 71.
- July 9: Josse Goffin, Belgian artist and comic book artist (Dupuis, Spirou), dies at age 85.
- July 22: Nobuhiro Sakata, Japanese manga creator (Dan Doh!!, Kaze no Daichi), dies at age 76.
- July 25: Gérard Deuquet, A.K.A. Géday, Belgian painter and comic artist (assisted on The Smurfs, drew educational comics for Spirou), dies at age 87.
- July 29: Chris Berg, American-Dutch comic artist (Harry the Intergalactic Milkman), dies at age 55.
- July 31:
  - André Juillard, French comic writer and artist (Bohémond de Saint Gilles, Arno, Les Septs Vies de l'Épervier, Masquerouge, Plume Aux Vents, continued Blake and Mortimer), dies at age 76.
  - Taral Wayne, Canadian artist and comic book writer and artist (Beatrix Farmer, Wild!), dies at age 72.

=== August ===
- August 1: Joyce Brabner, wife of Harvey Pekar & American comics writer and editor (Real War Stories, Brought to Light, Activists!, Animal Rights Comics, Cambodia USA, Second Avenue Caper, the American Splendor spin-off Our Cancer Year and American Splendor Family), dies at age 72.
- August 13: Luuk Klazenga, Dutch comic artist (Tsjam, Tomke), dies at age 60.
- August 17:
  - John Graziano, American illustrator and comic artist (continued Ripley's Believe it or Not), dies at age 62.
  - Philippe Ory, French comic colorist, dies at an unknown age.
- August 20: Maximino Tortajada Aguilar, Spanish comic artist (Disney comics), dies at age 62.
- August 27:
  - Sergio Asteriti, Italian comic writer and artist (Disney comics, continued Formichino), dies at age 94.
  - Julius de Goede, Dutch illustrator, comic artist (Eric de Noorman parody in the Dutch version of Mad Magazine, comics for Pep), writer (various articles and one book about Eric de Noorman) and publisher (Julius de Goede BV), dies at age 80.
- August 29: Yoon Jun-hwan, South Korean cartoonist, dies at age 83.

=== September ===
- September 2: Bernie Mireault, Canadian comic writer and artist (Bug-Eyed Monster, Mackenzie Queen, Dr. Robot) and colorist (Grendel), commits suicide at age 63.
- September 9: John Cassaday, American comic book artist (Planetary, Astonishing X-Men, Captain America), dies at age 52.
- September 10: Kazu Yuzuki, Japanese manga artist (Garo), dies at age 69–70.
- September 11: Peter Klashorst, Dutch painter (made occasional comics), dies at age 67.
- September 12: Karl Moline, American comic book artist (Fray, Route 666, Loners), dies at age 51.
- September 19: Stefan Verwey, Dutch comic artist and editorial cartoonist (Broeder Gosewijn), dies at age 78.
- September 28: Larry Todd, American comic artist (Dr. Atomic), dies at age 76.
- September 29: Ed McLachlan, British editorial cartoonist and illustrator, dies at age 84.
- September 30:
  - Bob Foster, American animator, storyboard artist, comic writer and editor (Myron Moose Funnies, Disney comics), dies at age 81.
  - Karl Mostert, South African comic artist (The Lil' Five), dies at age 43.

=== October ===
- October 3: Pierre Christin, French comics writer, novelist and journalist (Valérian and Laureline, Légendes d'Ajourd'hui, Fins de Siècle), dies at age 86.
- October 4:
  - Marina Voskanyants, Russian cartoonist, dies at age 90.
  - Dina Kathelyn, Belgian comic book artist (Murena, Destins), dies at age 90.
- October 5: Giorgio Trevisan, Italian comic artist (War Picture Library, Ken Parker, Julia), dies at age 89.
- October 8: Job, Swiss comic writer (Yakari), dies at age 96.
- October 16: Peter van Leersum, Dutch art director, chief editor (chief editor of comics magazine Eppo Wordt Vervolgd/Sjors en Sjimmie Stripblad), comics writer (Black Star) and columnist (wrote for the comics information magazine StripNieuws), dies at age 77.
- October 18: Mahasen Al-Khatib, Palestinian web cartoonist, dies at age 30 or 31.
- October 21: Massimiliano Frezzato, Italian comic book artist (Keepers of the Maser, comics for Heavy Metal Magazine, Margot Queen of the Night), dies at age 57.
- October 27: René Uilenbroek, Dutch comics artist (Koos De Supporter, Soeperman, Stanley), dies at age 63.
- October 28: Kazuo Umezu, Japanese manga creator (The Drifting Classroom, My Name Is Shingo, Cat Eyed Boy), dies at age 88.
- October 31: Greg Hildebrandt, American illustrator and comic artist (Marvel Comics, DC Comics, Star Wars, Terry and the Pirates), dies at age 85.

=== November ===
- November 4: Daniel Ceppi, Swiss comic artist (Stéphane, La Nuit des Clandestins), dies at age 73.
- November 9: Jack Staller, Dutch comics artist (The Black Hawk Line, De Vliegende Hollander, Dafne, De Tiende Planeet, Dakota, drew comics for Red Ears), dies at age 81 or 82.
- November 11: Christian Godard, French comic writer (The Vagabond of Limbo, A.K.A. Axel Moonshine) and artist (Martin Milan, Norbert et Kari), dies at age 92.
- November 20: Peter Maddocks, English editorial cartoonist, comic artist (Four-D Jones, Horatio Cringe, Nr. 10, A Leg At Each Corner, Penny Crayon, continued Useless Eustache) and animator, dies at age 96.
- November 25: Frans van Wensholt, Dutch composer and comics artist (Ernst en Amber), dies at age 66.

=== December ===
- December 16: David A. McIntee, British writer and comic book writer (Jason and the Argonauts, Female Force, Quest for Tomorrow, The God Project), dies at age 55.
- December 19:
  - Michael Leunig, Australian cartoonist, dies at age 79.
  - Barry N. Malzberg, American writer and comic book writer (Open Space), dies at age 85.
- December 25: Kiriko Nananan, Japanese comic artist (Blue, Strawberry Shortcakes), dies at age 52.

== Conventions ==
- March 16-17: MoCCA Festival (Metropolitan Pavilion, New York City)
- July 25–28: San Diego Comic-Con (San Diego Convention Center, San Diego, California)
- September 14–15: Small Press Expo [SPX] (Bethesda North Marriott Hotel & Conference Center, North Bethesda, Maryland)
- September 20–22: Baltimore Comic-Con (Baltimore Convention Center, Baltimore, Maryland)
- September 26–29: Cartoon Crossroads Columbus (Columbus, Ohio) — guests include Ahn Jae-Huun, Alexandra Bowman, Art Spiegelman, Ben Passmore, Bianca Xunise, Bryan Lee O’Malley, Chip Zdarsky, Chris Oliveros, Cole Pauls, David Rickert, Edward Steed, Françoise Mouly, Jeff Smith, Jerry Craft, Kate Beaton, L. Pidge, Lisa Sterle, Léonie Bischoff, Maggie Umber, Nate Powell, Rafael Rosado, Rupert Kinnard, Ryan Holmberg, Sam Szabo, and Tina Horn
- October 17–20: New York Comic Con (Javits Center, New York City)
- December 7–8: Massachusetts Independent Comics Expo [MICE] (Fuller Building, Boston University, Brookline, Massachusetts) — event moves to a December weekend
