= Aurélia Aurita =

French comics writer (born 1980)

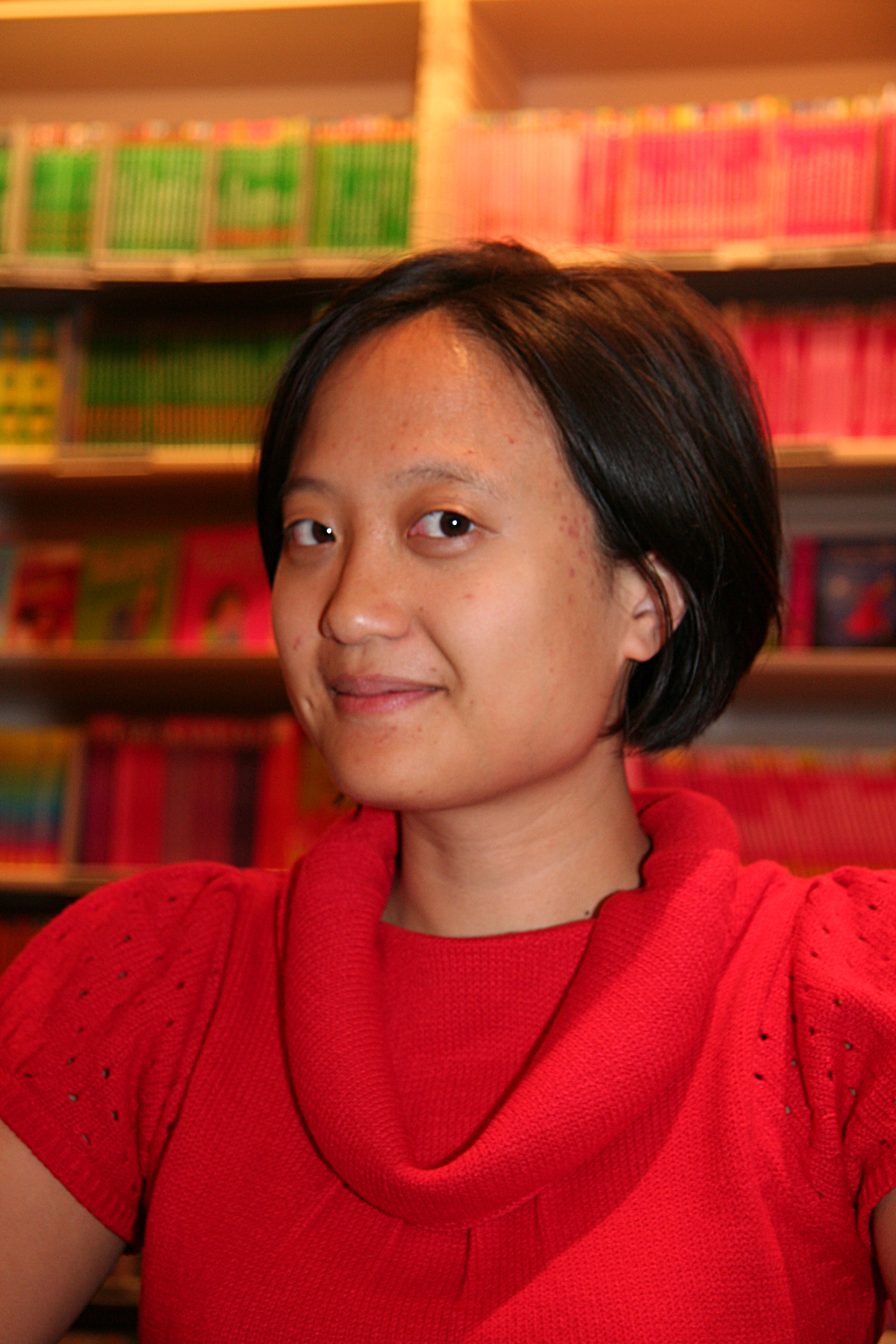
- (2007)
- Born: Hakchenda Khun; 10 April 1980 (age 46) Châtenay-Malabry, Hauts-de-Seine, France
- Areas: Writer, Artist

Aurélia Aurita is the pseudonym of the French bande dessinée (comic book) album author, Hakchenda Khun (first name often shortened to Chenda; born 1980). Her pseudonym is the scientific name of a species of jellyfish, Aurelia aurita.

== Biography ==
Hakchenda Khun was born in Châtenay-Malabry, Hauts-de-Seine, on 10 April 1980. She is of Chinese and Khmer origin.

Khun studied drawing at the École Arc en Ciel in Antony, Hauts-de-Seine and published short stories in the monthly Fluide Glacial, in the magazine PLG or in collectives such as Stereoscomic and FLBLB, while studying pharmacy, which she completed: "I know by heart 150 plant names from the indigenous French flora, as well as 15 ways to use suppositories". In 2001, she won the prize for the best scenario in the Alph'Art competition for school comics at the Angoulême International Comics Festival.

Her first album is entitled Angora. In 2004, she was invited to participate in a collective album dedicated to Japan, the country where she lived for a while. Her second album, Fraise et Chocolat (2006), is an erotic and autobiographical story about her romantic relationship with Frédéric Boilet, who also a comic book author.

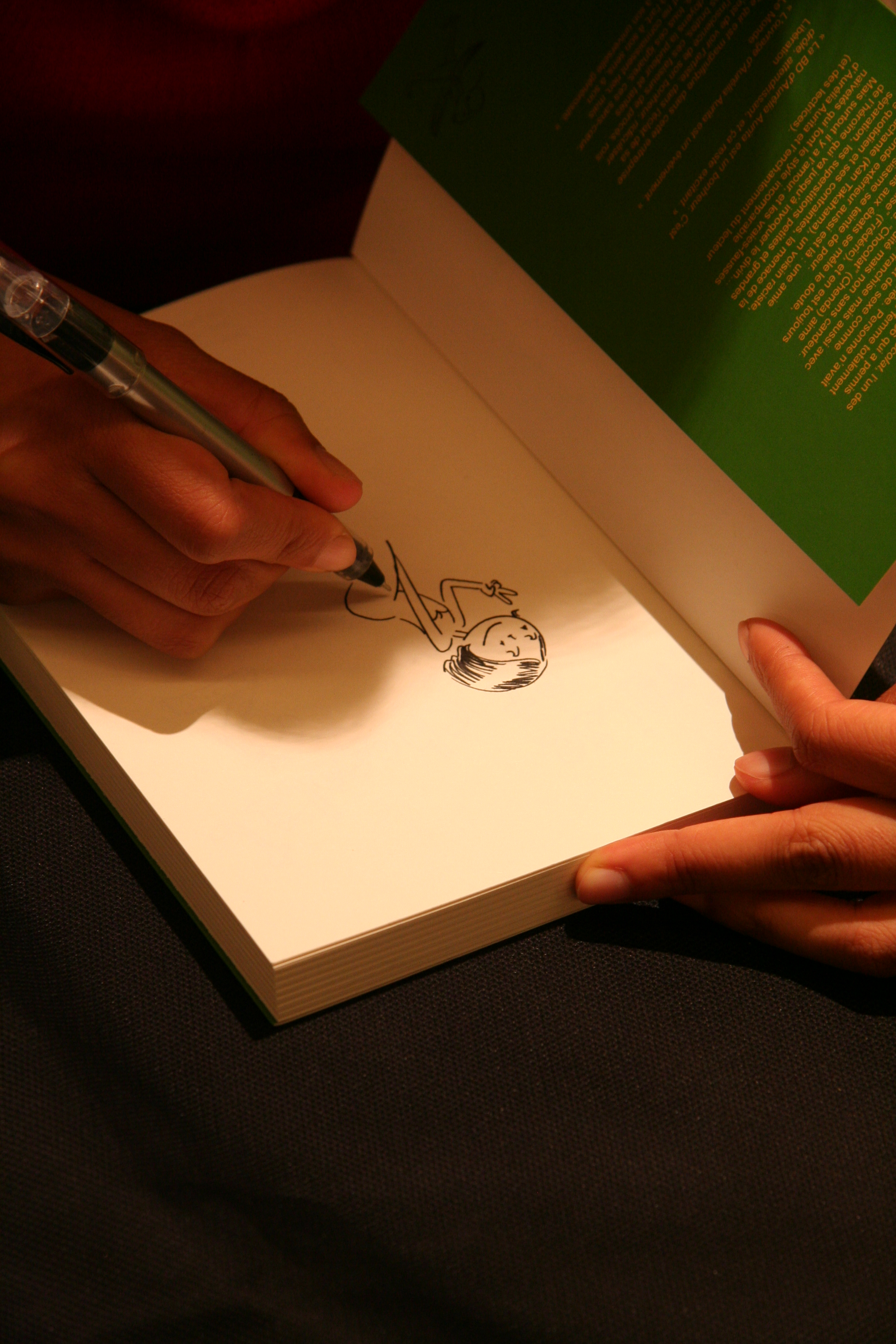
Autograph session at Fnac Saint-Lazare (Paris, France)

In 2007, Aurita published the sequel to this album, Fraise et Chocolat 2, before publishing Je ne verrai pas Okinawa, then, under the title Buzz-moi, a chronicle of the reception of Fraise et Chocolat. In 2011, she signed with Boilet a children's album, Vivi des Vosges.

In January 2014, LAP ! un roman d'apprentissage (LAP! a coming-of-age novel) was published, the first part of a trilogy on the Lycée autogéré de Paris. The next year, Aurita published Ma vie est un best-seller (My life is a bestseller) with Casterman, based on a screenplay by Corinne Maier, in which the latter recounts the media coverage and success of her book Bonjour paresse (Hello laziness). In 2018, still with Casterman, Aurita illustrated Comme un chef (Like a boss), based on an autobiographical screenplay by Benoît Peeters, who recounts his passion for cooking at the time he was studying semiotics with Roland Barthes.

In 2022, Aurita published La vie gourmande (The gourmet life), in which she discusses illness, life, desire and food. She explains that,—

Je me suis raccrochée à la nourriture, parce que c'est le plaisir le plus accessible et immédiat lorsqu'on est affaibli par les traitements", mais aussi "la maladie rappelle qu'on a un corps, qu'on est mortel. Le goût réveille le corps."
('I clung to food because it is the most accessible and immediate pleasure when you are weakened by treatment', but also 'illness reminds you that you have a body, that you are mortal. Taste awakens the body.')

The book won the Prix de la BD du Point (Le Point Comic Book Prize) in 2022.

== Awards and honours ==
- 2007, Sélection Prix Nouveaux Talents de la BD (New Comic Strip Talents Prize Selection), for Fraise et Chocolat
- 2016, Selection Prix Artémisia (Artemisia Prize Selection), for Ma vie est un best-seller, text by Corinne Maier
- 2022, Prix de la BD du Point (Le Point Comic Book Prize), pour La Vie gourmande

== Albums ==
=== Scriptwriter and illustrator ===
- Angora, Stereoscomic, republished by Le 9e Monde, 2003
- Fraise et Chocolat (Strawberry and Chocolate), Les Impressions Nouvelles, 2006, prefaced by Joann Sfar ISBN 2-87449-009-1.
- Fraise et Chocolat 2 (Strawberry and Chocolate 2), Les Impressions Nouvelles, 2007
- Je ne verrai pas Okinawa (I won't see Okinawa), Les Impressions Nouvelles, 2008
- Buzz-moi (Buzz me), Les Impressions Nouvelles, 2009
- Vivi des Vosges (Vivi of the Vosges), in collaboration with Frédéric Boilet, Les Impressions Nouvelles, 2011
- LAP ! un roman d'apprentissage (LAP! a coming-of-age novel), Les Impressions Nouvelles, 2014.
- La Vie gourmande (The Gourmet Life), Casterman, 2022
- Participant: Marie Moinard and collective, En chemin elle rencontre... Les artistes se mobilisent pour l'égalité femme-homme. Des ronds dans l'O / Amnesty International, vol. 3. February 2013 ISBN 978-2-917237-46-5

=== Illustrator ===
- Corinne Maier, Ma vie est un best-seller (My life is a best-seller), Casterman, 2015 ISBN 9782203097230
- Comme un chef (Like a boss), script by Benoît Peeters, Casterman, 2018

=== Magazines and collectives ===
- La Démission (The Resignation), 2 pages, Fourmi Sismographique, Tanibis, 2001.
- L'Après-midi chez Élise (An afternoon at Elise's), 1p., Stereoscomic spécial SPX, 2001.
- An afternoon at Elise's, 1p., Stereoscomic special SPX (English version), 2001.
- Paris-Saïgon, 5p., FLBLB no. 13, 2001.
- Janine de huit à huit (Janine from eight to eight), 2p., Fluide Glacial no. 303, Audie, 2001.
- Ma grand-mère était actrice (My grandmother was an actress), 6p., Fluide Glacial no. 313, Audie, 2002.
- Lune de miel (Honeymoon), 6p., Fluide Glacial no. 318, 2002.
- Mon autobiographie (par Chris M. et Madeline M.) (My Autobiograph, by Chris M. and Madeline M.), 3p., Rhinocéros Contre Éléphant no. 3, Tanibis, 2002.
- Le Miracle de l'érection (The Miracle of Erection), 1p., Stereoscomic no. 4, 2002.
- La Sirène qui ne savait pas nager (The Mermaid Who Couldn't Swim), 5p., PLG no. 37, 2003.
- De zeemeermin die niet kon zwemmen (The Sea Mermaid Can't Swim), 5p., Zone 5300 no. 10, 2003.
- Lellebel in de ruimte (Les cochonnes de l'espace) (Lellebel in the room 'Space pigs'), 5p., Zone 5300 nos. 11-2, 2004.
- Je peux mourir, maintenant ! (I can die now!), 20p., collectif Japon, Casterman, 2005.
- Mes voisins (My neighbors), 3p., collectif Terriens, Mécanique Générale / Les 400 coups, 2006.
- Shotaiken (La première fois) (Shotaiken 'The first time'), 4p., Spore no. 4, 2006.

== See also ==
- La nouvelle manga
- Cambodians in France
