= Kan Takahama =

Japanese manga artist (born 1977)

- 高浜 寛
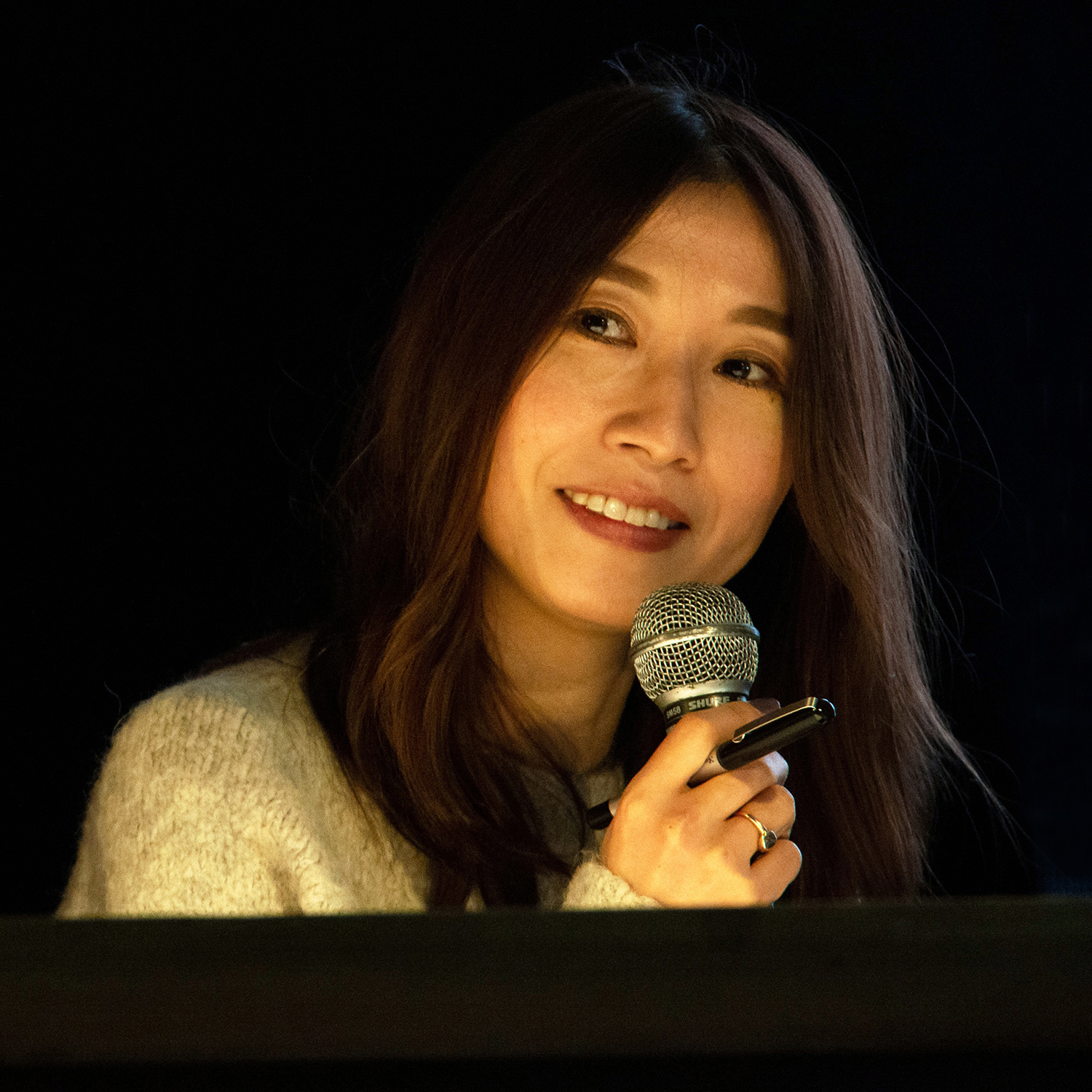
- Kan Takahama at Angoulême Festival 2020
- Born: April 6, 1977 (age 49); Amakusa, Japan
- Occupation: Manga artist
- Notable work: Yellowbacks/Kinderbook; Mariko Parade; Two Espressos; Nyx no Lantern
- Awards: 2004: The Comics Journal Best Short Story Award for Yellowbacks; 2018: Excellence Award from the Japan Media Arts Festival for Nyx no Lantern; 2020: 24th Tezuka Osamu Cultural Prize for Nyx no Lantern

Kan Takahama (Japanese: 高浜 寛, Hepburn: Takahama Kan; born April 6, 1977) is a Japanese manga artist born in Amakusa, Kumamoto Prefecture. Debuting in 2001, she became known for her short stories published in the alternative magazine Garo, later collected and republished in her award-winning Kinderbook. Her unique style often depicts the darker sides of everyday life through simplistic character designs and illustrations that blend manga and Franco-Belgian comics. She is internationally known for the manga Nyx no Lantern, winner of the 24th Osamu Tezuka Cultural Award in 2020.

== Biography ==
=== Early life and education ===
Kan Takahama was born on April 6, 1977, in the city of Amakusa, in the Kumamoto Prefecture. She studied contemporary art at the University of Tsukuba. Despite her interests in art, Takahama did not intend to create manga and instead, this hobby came to her through daily experiences where she found herself wanting to capture landscapes and discussions between people she cycled past and observed while working as a secretary at the National Institute for Environmental Studies. She found that drawing these discussions in comic book panels felt the best way to depict these interactions.

=== Career ===
Takahama's first opportunity with a publishing company came by surprise, while playfully drawing manga on scrap paper and drinking with friends one evening one friend of hers decided that she liked Takahama's short story so much that she asked for it to be redrawn on a proper piece of paper, she then sent it off to the publishing company Kodansha. Takahama was contacted soon after, being offered a job working with the company, she previously had never considered becoming a mangaka. While her time at the company was brief she produced a few essays that appeared on the website of Morning magazine also receiving the Manga Open Excellence prize on this occasion.

After her short time at Kodansha, Takahama participated in a contest organised by the monthly magazine Garo and she took the third prize for her story "Woman who survive". The story was published in the January 2001 edition of the magazine. The same year Takahama also received a 1st grand prize of excellence from Garo for a piece titled Binari Sun. She continued to publish regularly in Garo through 2001 and 2002 and these short stories were collected in the Yellowbacks volume, which was published in Japan by Seirindô in February 2002. They were later published in France, Spain and the USA as Kinderbook. Garo magazine stopped publishing after Takahama had been working there for two years. She failed to gain the rights to her published manga and she has never been paid for her work with them.

While working at Garo several readers told Takahama that her style was similar to that of French comics, she disagreed at first until the president of Garo at the time suggested her works specifically resembled the works of Frédéric Boilet. After purchasing one of his works titled Yukiko's Spinach she discovered the similarities between her work and his, specifically the focus on capturing daily life. Takahama researched Boilet further and came across his proposal for the Nouvelle manga movement which sought to combine mature manga stories with the art style of Franco-Belgian comics. His ideas led her to reach out to him believing she could bring something to his project. After working together to produce the story 'Mariko Parade', the two met at the Angoulême International Comics Festival in 2002, in search of a publisher where the major publisher Casterman took interest. After this collaboration, Takahama published her first story in French for the magazine Bang!, titled Bons Baisers d'Angoulême. The story was a good-humoured account of her visit to the Angoulême festival. Soon after she released the story Awabi in Japan, in 2004.

Takahama continued to work with Casterman for a few years. Her next manga titled Nagi Watari - Oyobi Sono Hoka no Tanpen was published in 2006 in Japan, although it was later released in France in 2009 as part of a collection titled L'Eau amère (translated to Bitter Water) that included her previously released story, Awabi. Starting in 2004 Casterman had also commissioned Takahama and two other mangakas to produce a new project titled Two Espressos. The project was met with issues, the two other mangakas withdrew halfway through production leaving Takahama to work alone, she was further delayed by family issues leading to the eventual release of this story after five years in 2010.

In the following years, Takahama worked on several manga the first of which was Sad Girl, (produced as part of a Casterman collection in 2012).Yotsuya-ku Hanazono-chō, was her next piece. At the time Takahama worked part-time at an eel shop which meant for the first time she drew her illustrations digitally instead of in pen to save time. This work was published by Takeshobō in 2013. She went on to produce Chou no Michiyuki (translated to Flight of the Butterflies), released in 2014 and given praise from the well respected mangaka, Jirō Taniguchi.

In 2016, Takahama began to publish the first in what is her current longest and most complex series of manga, titled Nyx no Lantern. The series finished in 2019 and consisted of 6 volumes. The story focused on a young orphan gifted with clairvoyance set between Japan and France during the years of the Paris Universal Exposition of 1878. The series was well received and won the 2018 excellence award at the Japan Media Arts Festival, as well as the 24th Tezuka Osamu Cultural Prize in 2020.

=== Personal life ===
Takahama has spoken about her struggles with alcohol early into her career as a mangaka due to her sudden fame and attention from the media, staying up late to be part of international interviews and answering the same questions constantly. She described alcohol as the only way she could get through this process. She has since recovered and currently lives up in the mountains in Amakusa with her husband, drawing and producing manga.

== Works ==
- Monokuro Kinderbook/Yellowbacks (イエローバックス, Ierōbakkusu), Seirindō, 2002, Yūgaku shorin, 2007 (Kinderbook, Casterman collection “Sakka”, 2004)
- Mariko Parade (まり子パラード), Ohta Publishing, 2003 (Mariko Parade, Casterman "Scriptures" collection, 2003), with Frédéric Boilet
- Awabi (泡日), Yūgaku shorin, 2004 (Bitter Water, Casterman collection “Sakka”, 2009)
- Nagi watari - Oyobi sono hokano tanpen (凪渡り--及びその他の短篇), Kawade shobō shinsha, 2006 (Bitter Water, Casterman collection “Sakka”, 2009)
- Two Espressos (トゥー・エスプレッソ, Tū esupuresso), Ohta Publishing, 2010 (2 espressos, Casterman "Scriptures" collection, 2010)
- Sad Girl (サッドガール), Short stories, Leed Publishing, 2015
- Yotsuya-ku Hanazono-chō (四谷区花園町), Takeshobō, 2013 (Tokyo, love and freedoms, Glénat “Seinen” collection, 2017)
- Chō no michiyuki (蝶のみちゆき), Leed Publishing, 2014 (The Last Flight of the Butterfly, Glénat collection “Seinen”, 2017)
- Nyx no Lantern (ニュクスの角灯, Nyukusu no Rantan), Leed Publishing, 2016 (The Nyx lantern, Glénat “Seinen” collection, 2019)

== Awards ==
- Manga Open Excellence Award from Weekly Morning magazine for Mont Saint-Michel
- 2001: 1st Grand Prize of Excellence from Garo magazine for Binari Sun
- 2004: The Comics Journal Best Short Story Award for Yellowbacks
- 2018: Excellence Award from the Japan Media Arts Festival for Nyx no Lantern
- 2020: 24th Tezuka Osamu Cultural Prize for Nyx no Lantern
