= Blue (2002 film) =

- Directed by: Hiroshi Ando
- Written by: Yuka Honcho
- Based on: Blue by Kiriko Nananan
- Produced by: Dai Miyazaki
- Starring: Mikako Ichikawa; Manami Konishi
- Cinematography: Kazuhiro Suzuki
- Edited by: Nobuko Tomita
- Release date: 2002
- Running time: 116 minutes
- Country: Japan
- Language: Japanese

Blue is a 2002 Japanese romantic drama directed by Hiroshi Ando based on the manga of the same name by Kiriko Nananan. The film stars Mikako Ichikawa as Kayako Kirishima and Manami Konishi as Masami Endo. The film was first shown at the Toronto International Film Festival in 2002, and was released in Japanese theaters in 2003.

The film is about two teenage girls, Kayako Kirishima and Masami Endō, who find their friendship turning into something more.

== Plot ==
Kayako Kirishima, in her third year at a high school, feels a sense of isolation in school life and vague admiration and uneasiness about the future. Living in a small coastal town, she feels there is not much going on. One day she makes friends with Endō, who is isolated from her surroundings because she remained in the same class for another year. Kayako and Endō start to hang out more and more after school, eventually developing a bond throughout the year.

One day Kayako and Endō meet up at a beach and Endō notices that Kayako is acting weird. Kayako reveals to Endō that she likes her, and then proceeds to walk away but stops when Endō confirms with her what she means by "like." Kayako falls to her knees crying, but Endō comforts her with a kiss, and they spend the evening together. Later that night Endō reveals to Kayako that she had an abortion the year prior.

One day in school Kayako is informed by a friend that Endō was drunk one day last year while they were out and she met a married man, who she didn't know was married. The relationship ended after he got her pregnant. The friend also informs Kayako that Endō is on a trip because she got a call from that man recently, and learning that he and his wife had split up, goes to meet him.

Kayako meets Endō when she returns from her trip and questions her about who she was seeing, but Endō doesn't tell her the truth and simply says she was with some middle school friends. Kayako knows the truth and asks again, but Endō simply says that Kayako won't know who they are and gives her some grapes she bought. Kayako leaves angrily and the grapes are tossed in the trash. The following day Kayako refuses to answer the calls from Endō and instead grabs the grapes from the trash and starts painting. In school she continues to give Endō the cold shoulder.

As the year gets towards the end, Kayako is accepted into an art studio to teach her how to draw with hopes of going to Tokyo after graduation for college. Endō visits her at the art studio and tries to talk to her, but as she kisses Kayako, Kayako pushes her away and calls her a terrible person. Endō runs away, but Kayako goes after her and they spend the rest of the day together. They spend the evening at the beach where their relationship started, and Endō admits to Kayako that she in fact went to meet her previous lover. As they walk away together Endō tells Kayako she told him she called it off with him prior to leaving, and that she did it for Kayako. Kayako tells Endō that in Endō's heart, Kayako is the second one, and that even if she broke up with her lover, that first spot is for a different man one day.

As they walk away, Kayako tells Endō that even if she doesn't love her as much as she love Endō, Endō will always be the one she loves most. As they spend the entire night walking around the beach, they fantasized about a life together in Tokyo after graduation. Endō tells Kayako that she can't go, not just because her parents need her, but because she hasn't found a purpose in life. Endō praises Kayako for following through with her plans to be an artist. They share a kiss as they take the morning bus to school.

After graduation Kayako leaves for Tokyo while Endō remains in the small coastal town. One day Kayako gets a video from Endō, with Kayako stating she has watched the same video over and over. In the video it shows Endō walking alone at the beach where they first started their relationship. Endō simply leaves a message to Kayako, stating "this is all I can do."

== Cast ==
- Mikako Ichikawa as Kayako Kirishima
- Manami Konishi as Masami Endō
- Asami Imajuku as Mieko Nakano
- Ayano Nakamura as Chika Watanabe
- Sosuke Takaoka as Mizuuchi Manabu
- Jun Murakami as Older man

== Reception ==
Variety called the film impressive but overlong.

== Awards ==
- 24th Moscow International Film Festival: Best Actress Prize (Mikako Ichikawa)

== Location ==
- Niigata
  - Bandai Bridge
  - Furumachi
  - Niigata Station
- Takaoka, Toyama

== See also ==
- All about Lily Chou Chou
- Blue Spring
