= La nouvelle manga =

French and Japanese artistic movement

Nouvelle Manga (French: La nouvelle manga, pronounced [la nuvɛl mɑ̃ɡa]) is an artistic movement which gathers French and Japanese comic creators together. The expression was first used by Kiyoshi Kusumi, editor of the Japanese manga magazine Comickers, in referring to the work of French expatriate Frédéric Boilet, who lived in Japan for much of his career but has since returned to France in December 2008. Boilet adopted the term for himself and encouraged other artists to participate.

== History ==
The Nouvelle Manga movement was born of several observations. Whereas European cinema often bases its theme on everyday life, French/Belgian bande dessinée has, for a long time, been restricted to stereotyped genres such as science fiction or westerns. Japanese authors on the other hand exploit daily life extensively – but these are often the least likely to be widely translated.

For the participants of Nouvelle Manga there are bridges to build between the comics of all nationalities, not least between the comics d'auteur in each country.

People often restrict Nouvelle Manga to the world of alternative comics, yet there are many examples of Nouvelle Manga authors publishing in all kinds of arenas. For instance, Boilet himself has been published in mainstream Seinen magazines like Big Comics in Japan as well as in alternative editorial structures such as Spore in Japan, Ego Comme X in France and, more recently, Fanfare / Ponent Mon in the US. Boilet prefers to refer to Nouvelle Manga as being in the French feminine form (la) as opposed to the French masculine form (le) which is used for the very mainstream action-oriented manga that is more usually published in France.

Examples of artists who are associated in varying degrees with the outputs and debates surrounding Nouvelle Manga are: Moyoko Anno, Aurélia Aurita, David B., Matthieu Blanchin, Frédéric Boilet, Nicolas de Crécy, Étienne Davodeau, Yoji Fukuyama, Emmanuel Guibert, Kazuichi Hanawa, Daisuke Igarashi, Little Fish, Taiyō Matsumoto, Fabrice Neaud, Loïc Néhou, Benoît Peeters, Frédéric Poincelet, David Prudhomme, François Schuiten, Joann Sfar, Kiriko Nananan, Hideji Oda, Kan Takahama, Jiro Taniguchi, Yoshiharu Tsuge, Vanyda and Naito Yamada.

A great exhibition and a cycle of debates were held in Tokyo in September and October 2001, notably at the Tokyo Museum of Fine Arts and at the French-Japanese Institute.

Nouvelle Manga has extended to other media with Nouvelle Manga Digitale, a creation of the multimedia author Fred Boot.

== Nouvelle manga books in English ==
- Yukiko's Spinach - Frédéric Boilet (Fanfare/Ponent Mon, 2003)
- Monokuro Kinderbook - Kan Takahama (Fanfare/Ponent Mon, 2003)
- Mariko Parade - Frédéric Boilet & Kan Takahama (Fanfare/Ponent Mon, 2004)
- Doing Time - Kazuichi Hanawa (Fanfare/Ponent Mon, 2004)
- The Walking Man - Jiro Taniguchi (Fanfare/Ponent Mon, 2004)
- Blue - Kiriko Nananan (Fanfare/Ponent Mon, 2005)
- The Times of Botchan vol. 1 - Jiro Taniguchi & Natsuo Sekikawa (Fanfare/Ponent Mon, 2005)
- The Times of Botchan vol. 2 - Jiro Taniguchi & Natsuo Sekikawa (Fanfare/Ponent Mon, 2005)
- Japan as Viewed by 17 Creators - Various Authors (Fanfare/Ponent Mon, 2006)
- A Patch of Dreams - Hideji Oda (Fanfare/Ponent Mon, 2006)
- Sweet Cream and Red Strawberries - Kiriko Nananan (Central Park Media, 2006)
- The Building Opposite - Vanyda (Fanfare/Ponent Mon, 2006)

== See also ==
- Manfra, a general term for describing Japanese-influenced French comics
- Manga-influenced comics
- Anime-influenced animation
