= Frédéric Boilet =

French cartoonist and manga artist (1960–2026)

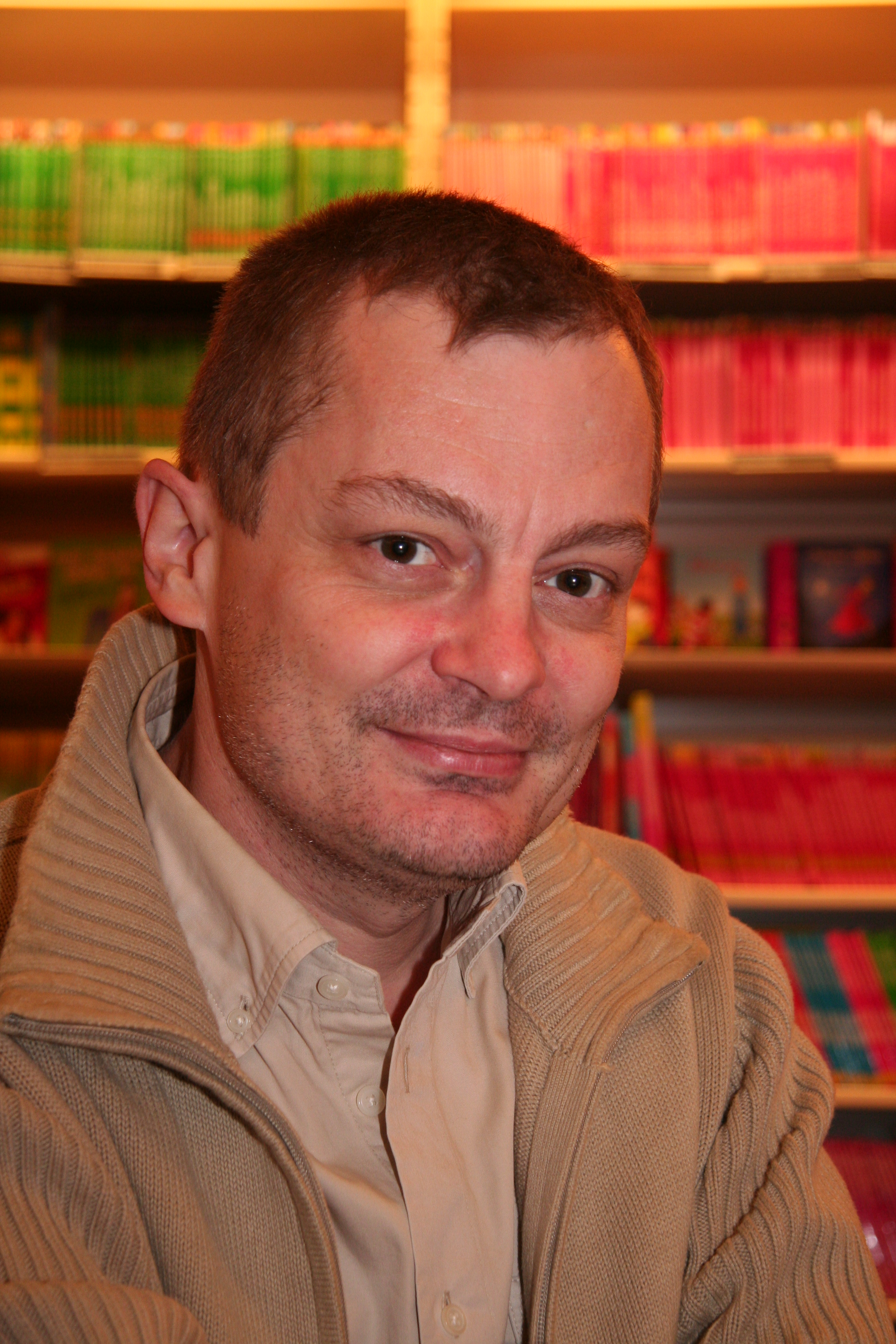
- Boilet in October 2007
- Born: 16 January 1960; Épinal, France
- Died: 10 November 2026 (aged 66)
- Occupations: Cartoonist; manga artist

Frédéric Boilet (French: [bwalɛ]; 16 January 1960 – 10 November 2026) was a French cartoonist and a manga artist.

== Life and career ==
Boilet was born in Épinal on 16 January 1960. His debut in comic art was in 1983 with La Nuit des Archées.

He created Le Rayon vert in 1987, followed by 36 15 Alexia in 1990, two albums where he experimented with a method of working, that is still uniquely his today, in which he resorts almost exclusively to photographs and video.

His encounter with Benoît Peeters in 1990 turned his work toward semi-autobiographical stories tinged with humour : Love Hotel (1993), Tôkyô est mon jardin (1997) and Demi-tour (1997).

For some years Boilet lived in Japan, where Tôkyô est mon jardin, meaning "Tokyo is my garden," was translated in 1998 and Demi-tour the following year. He started doing work for manga magazines in the late nineties, and was a rare example of a western comics artist having some degree of success in the Japanese market.

In 2001, on the occasion of the simultaneous publication in France and Japan of the critically acclaimed Yukiko's Spinach, he launched the Nouvelle Manga movement in Tokyo, which sought to combine mature sophisticated daily life manga with the artistic style of traditional Franco-Belgian comics. Aurélia Aurita's Fraise et Chocolat (2006) is an autobiographical story of her romantic relationship with Boilet.

Boilet's final production work was L'apprenti Japonais. Boilet claimed to have finished his editorial career with this work, a book of unused drawings from the twelve years spanning from 1996 to 2008, all concerning the time he had spent in Japan. He returned to France.

Boilet died on 10 November 2026, at the age of 66.

== Bibliography ==
=== In English ===
- Yukiko's Spinach (Fanfare / Ponent Mon, 2003)
- Mariko Parade – with Kan Takahama (Fanfare / Ponent Mon, 2004)

=== In French ===
- La Nuit des Archées – with Guy Deffeyes (Bayard Presse, 1983)
- Les Veines de l'Occident Vol.1, la Fille des Ibères – with René Durand (Glénat, 1985)
- Les Veines de l'Occident Vol.2, le Cheval-démon – with René Durand (Glénat, 1988)
- Le Rayon vert (Magic Strip, 1987)
- 36 15 Alexia (Les Humanoïdes Associés, 1990 / Ego comme X, 2004)
- Love Hotel – with Benoît Peeters and Jiro Taniguchi (Casterman, 1993 / Ego comme X, 2005)
- Tôkyô est mon jardin (Casterman, 1997, 2003)
- Demi-tour – with Benoît Peeters and Emmanuel Guibert (Dupuis, 1997)
- L'Épinard de Yukiko (Ego comme X, 2001)
- Mariko Parade – with Kan Takahama (Casterman, 2003)
- L'Apprenti Japonais (Les Impressions Nouvelles, 2006)

=== In Japanese ===
- ｢東京は僕の庭｣(Tôkyô wa boku no niwa) – with Benoît Peeters and Jiro Taniguchi (Kôrinsha, 1998)
- ｢恋愛漫画ができるまで｣(Ren'ai manga ga dekiru made) – with Benoît Peeters and Emmanuel Guibert (Bijutsu Shuppansha, 1999)
- ｢ゆき子のホウレン草｣(Yukiko no hôrensô) (Ohta Shuppan, 2001)
- ｢まり子パラード｣(Mariko Parade) – with Kan Takahama (Ohta Shuppan, 2003)
