= Yuzuki =

Yuzuki is a feminine Japanese given name, primarily used by women, and is also used as a surname. It may refer to:

== People ==
=== Surname ===
- Asako Yuzuki (柚木 麻子; born 1981), Japanese writer
- Kazu Yuzuki (ユズキ カズ; 1954–2024), Japanese manga artist
- Yuzuki no Kimi (弓月君) the founder of the Hata clan
- Reon Yuzuki (柚希 礼音; born 1979), Japanese actress
- Ryoka Yuzuki (柚木 涼香; born 1974), Japanese actress
- Takeru Yuzuki (柚木 武; born 1998), Japanese tennis player
- Tina Yuzuki (柚木ティナ; born 1986), Japanese actress and singer
- Victoria Yuzuki (ビクトリア弓月; born 2005), Japanese professional wrestler

=== Given name ===
- Yuzuki Aikawa (愛川 ゆず季; born 1983), Japanese model and professional wrestler
- Yuzuki Akiyama (秋山 ゆずき; born 1993), Japanese actress
- Yuzuki Hidaka (日高 優月; born 1998), Japanese idol
- Yuzuki Ishiguro (石黒 友月; born 2003), Japanese idol
- Yuzuki Ito (伊藤 優津樹; born 1974), Japanese footballer
- Yuzuki Muroi (室井 佑月; born 1970), Japanese novelist
- Yuzuki Nakashima (中嶋 優月, born 2003), Japanese idol
- Yuzuki Satomi (里見 柚己, born 1997), Japanese kickboxer
- Yuzuki Watase (渡瀬 結月, born 2003), Japanese voice actress
- Yuzuki Yamato (大和 優槻; born 2003), Japanese professional footballer
- Yuzuki Yamamoto (山本 柚月; born 2002), Japanese professional footballer
- Yuzuki Ōguro (大黒 柚姫; born 1997), Japanese idol

== Fictional characters ==
- Yuzuki Yukari (結月ゆかり), a Vocaloid character
- Yuzuki Seo (瀬尾 結月), a character in the manga and anime series Monthly Girls' Nozaki-kun
- Yuzuki Fuwa (不破 優月), a character from the Assassination Classroom manga and anime series
- Yuzuki Choco (癒月ちょこ), a character from the "Hololive" virtual YouTuber (VTuber) talent agency
- Chie Yuzuki, a character from the manga and anime series Bloom Into You

== Other ==
- Japanese destroyer Yūzuki
- Yuzuki Castle
