= Dina Kathelyn =

Belgian illustrator and writer (1934–2024)

- Born: 17 February 1934; Uccle, Belgium
- Died: 1 October 2024 (aged 90)
- Occupations: Illustrator; Writer

Dina Kathelyn (17 February 1934 – 1 October 2024) was a Belgian illustrator and writer. She also wrote under the pseudonyms Catherine Haegen and Dina-K. Tourneur.

== Biography ==
Born in Uccle in 1934, Kathelyn worked for an advertising agency before illustrating as a freelancer. She illustrated books for the Belgian Red Cross prior to her discovery by the publishing house Casterman. In the 1970s, she began her work on the Marmouset series. The first volume in the series, titled Le Pied de Marmouset, was published in 1975. The 27 volumes in the series sold over two million French-language copies, with translations into several languages. The series was known as Petertje in Dutch, Yumurcak in Turkish, Stefan in German, and Caspar in English.

During the 2000s, Kathelyn worked as a comics colorist for comics series such as The Adventures of Alix, Murena, and Destins. In 2015, she published her first novel, titled Le Poison silence, followed by her second novel, Passe le train, published in 2019. In 2018, she stood in the local elections in the municipality of Forest for the party Ecolo, obtaining 290 votes. In 2020, she colored two volumes of the series Le Pape et le peintre by Paul Teng.

Dina Kathelyn died on 1 October 2024, at the age of 90.

== Publications ==
=== Marmouset ===
==== Le Corps de Marmouset ====
- Le Pied de Marmouset (1975)
- L'Oreille de Marmouset (1975)
- La Bouche de Marmouset (1975)
- Les Cheveux de Marmouset (1975)
- La Main de Marmouset (1975)
- Le Nez de Marmouset (1975)
- Le Nombril de Marmouset (1976)
- L’Œil de Marmouset (1976)

==== Les Grandes Actions de Marmouset ====
- Marmouset plante une graine
- Marmouset soigne une tourterelle (1977)
- Marmouset part en exploration (1977)
- Marmouset dessine sa maman (1977)
- Marmouset monte au grenier (1978)
- Marmouset chipe une pomme (1978)
- Marmouset a perdu son chien (1979)
- Marmouset entre à l'école
- Marmouset compte de un à dix

==== Marmouset et la vie ====
- Vive la mariée
- Bonjour petite Sylvie (1979)
- Au revoir oncle François (1979)

==== Marmouset et les autres ====
- Marmouset et Makumba
- Marmouset et Citronnelle
- Marmouset, Cerise et Cerisette
- Marmouset et Valentin
- Marmouset et Nicolas

==== Les Grands Albums de Marmouset ====
- Loup, loup, quelle heure est-il ? (1986)
- Marmouset apprend les mois

==== Je lis, je découvre, je joue avec Marmouset ====
- Les Chatons de Moune
- Le Chevalier des abeilles
- La Surprise de la poule grise
- Le Troisième agneau

==== Bonjour, Marmouset ====
- Le Pied de Marmouset (2015)
- La Main de Marmouset (2015)

=== Novels ===
- Le Poison silence (2015)
- Passe le train (2019)
- Joyeux anniversaire ! (2023)

=== Comics albums ===
- Les 7 crimes de Rome (2019)
