= Blue (manga) =

1996 Manga by Kiriko Nananan

- Spanish Edition of Blue by Ponent Mon
- Manga
- Written by: Kiriko Nananan
- Published by: Magazine House
- English publisher: UK: Ponent Mon, Fanfare (publisher)
- Magazine: COMIC Are!
- Original run: January 1996 – October 1996
- Volumes: 1
- Live-action film
- Blue

Blue (ブルー) is a manga by Kiriko Nananan that was serialized in the alternative manga magazine COMIC Are!; the tankōbon was released on April 24, 1997. The English version, published by Fanfare/Ponent Mon, was released on March 15, 2006. The manga was re-published in Japan under Shodensha's Feel Comics imprint in 2007. Blue is about two high school aged girls, Kayako Kirishima and Masami Endo, who find that their friendship is turning into something more, and they are unsure about their future and feel confused about their current life.

== Plot summary ==
Kayako Kirishima, who lives in Niigata, is almost ready to go off to college but is lonely and unsure of her future. One day in class, she meets social outcast Masami Endo, who is disliked by other students because she had an abortion. The two end up becoming friends, but as the days go on, they each find themselves falling in love with the other and struggle to make sense of their feelings. Eventually, they begin to date, and navigate the ups and downs of high school together.

When summer vacation starts, however, Endo goes on a vacation with the man who got her pregnant, a past lover, leaving Kirishima lonely and isolated. When Endo does return, she lies about her experiences and says that she was traveling with old friends. Kirishima knows she is lying and becomes upset with Endo, but ultimately forgives her; the two reconcile, and they decide their futures together. Kirishima decides to go off to Tokyo and pursue a career in art while Endo chooses to stay in her hometown and get a more modest job. The manga ends with Kirishima riding off in a train to Tokyo as Endo looks longingly towards the train.

== Style and influence ==
This work doesn't focus on expressionistic art and melodrama to tell its story; rather, in its place are minimalist, realistic imagery and storytelling. In accordance to this style the layouts are muted and many sequences of panels only show subtle movement to highlight a particular emotion.

Blue uses a minimalistic art style with a strong focus on faces and negative space.

The manga was popular enough to spawn a live action film adaptation in 2001. Additionally, Frédéric Boilet had it adapted to French as a part of his La nouvelle manga. The current English edition by Fanfare/Ponent Mon is borrowed from the French publication.

== See also ==
- Blue Spring (Manga)
