= Strawberry Shortcakes =

Japanese manga volume

- Cover of Strawberry Shortcakes as published by Shodensha
- Manga
- Written by: Kiriko Nananan
- Published by: Shodensha
- Published: 2002
- Volumes: 1
- Live-action film

Strawberry Shortcakes
- Directed by: Hitoshi Yazaki
- Released: 2006
- Runtime: 127 minutes

Strawberry Shortcakes (ストロベリーショートケイクス) is a one-volume manga written and illustrated by Kiriko Nananan, published by Shodensha in 2002. It is about the lives of four young women in a large city. It was licensed in French by Casterman manga imprint Sakka and in Italy by Kappa Edizioni. Strawberry Shortcakes was adapted into a film of the same title. It was licensed for English release by Central Park Media as Sweet Cream & Red Strawberries.

== Plot ==
The plot revolves around four ladies struggling to find happiness in the capital city of Tokyo: Satoko, who works as a receptionist at an escort service called "Heaven's Gate" and often prays to God to help her find a boy that will love her; Akiyo, who works at "Heaven's Gate" as a call girl and is infatuated with Kikuchi, an old school friend, who she gladly changes her appearance for; Chihiro, who works in a low-level office position and often involves herself with men who only use her for sex; and Toko, Chihiro's roommate who works obsessively as an illustrator and has bulimia, which she hides from everyone.

== Reception ==
=== Critical response ===
Xavier Guilbert, writing for du9, felt that it is quite different from other josei manga. M. Natali, writing for BD Gest', noted that the nonlinear presentation of the women's stories reinforces the connection between the characters, a resonance between the four characters lives, their feelings and disappointments. The reviewer for Manga-News said that the author "managed to get it right". Art wise both du9 and BD Gest' described it as uncluttered & aerial, and the use of oblong panels taking all the width of the page as reinforcing the impression of intimacy.

=== Accolades ===
- Best Supporting Actress: Yûko Nakamura, 2006 – Yokohama Film Festival
- Best Cinematography: Isao Ishii, 2006 – Yokohama Film Festival
