= Monokuro Kinderbook =

Manga written by Kan Takahama

イエローバックス (Ieroo Bakkusu)
- Genre: Drama
- Manga
- Written by: Kan Takahama
- Published by: Seirindo
- English publisher: NA / UK: Ponent Mon
- Published: 2002

Monokuro Kinderbook (Yellowbacks イエローバックス, Ierōbakkusu) is a one-shot Japanese manga written by Kan Takahama (高浜 寛, Takahama Kan) and published by Seirindo. The manga consists of an anthology of unrelated stories on the darker side of life. The manga is licensed for an English-language release in North America by Ponent Mon and a French-language release in France by Casterman.

== Reception ==
Mania.com's Janet Houck compares the anthology of stories in the manga with its respective endings with no conclusion to life in general.
