= Vanyda =

French comics artist

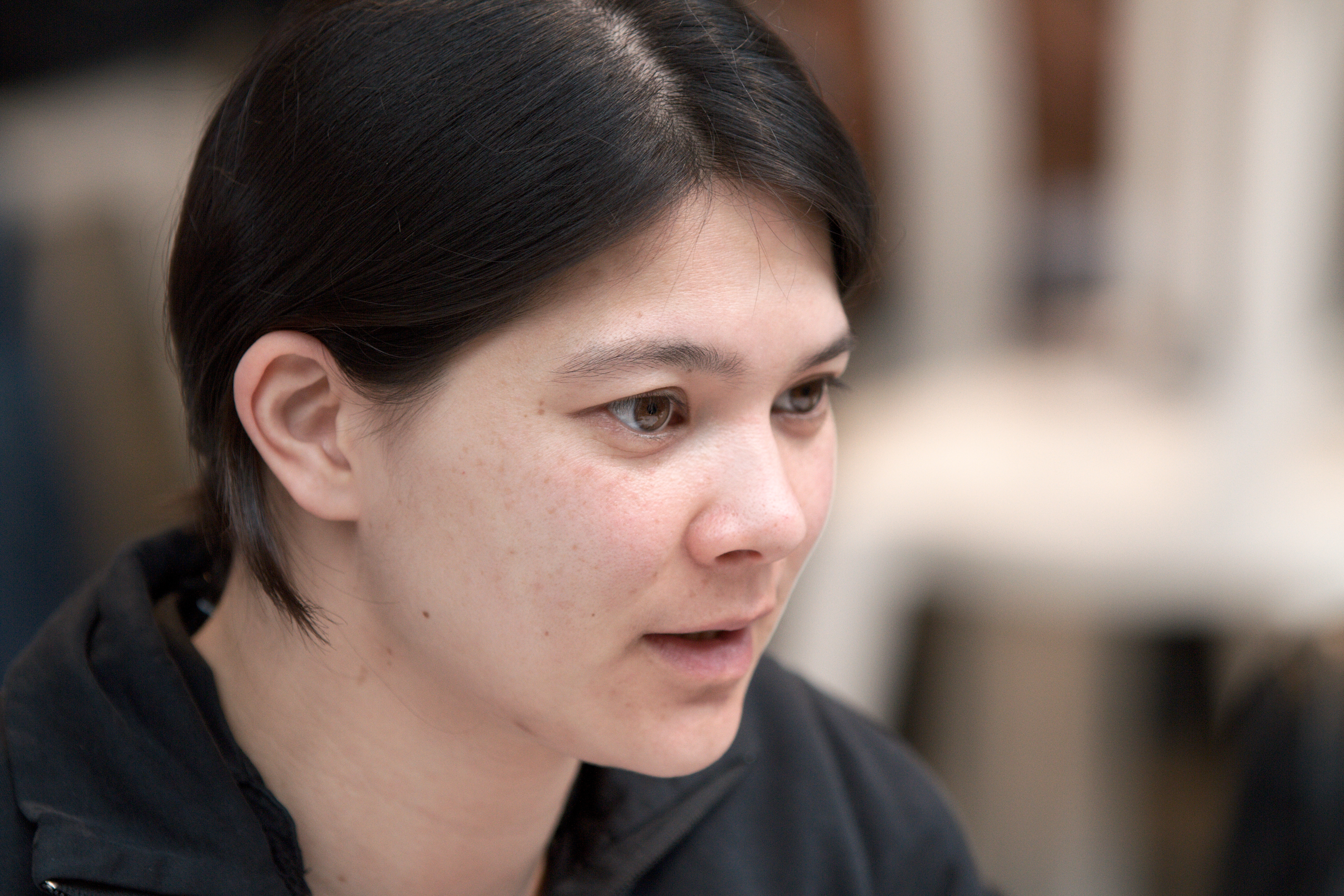
Vanyda in April 2010

Vanyda (born 1979) is a comic creator from Lille. She's part of the French comics new wave or La nouvelle manga. Vanyda's first album, The building opposite ('l'immeuble d'en face'), premiered in 2005 at the Angoulême International Comics Festival and was ranked Manga of the year 2006 by Publishers Weekly. Vanyda graduated from the Beaux Arts in Tournai (Belgium).

== Bibliography (translated) ==
- The building opposite (Fanfare / Ponent Mon)
