= Fabrice Neaud =

French comics artist

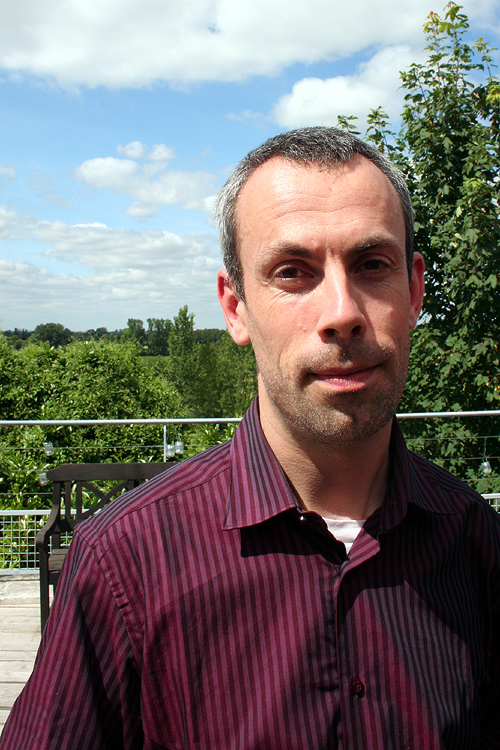
Fabrice Neaud

Fabrice Neaud (born December 17, 1968, in La Rochelle) is a French comics artist.

== Career ==
Neaud got his baccalaureate in literature (option graphic arts) in 1986. He studied philosophy during two years. Then he entered an art school and studied there four years. In 1991 he quit the school. For four years he had been looking for a job, making a living on various works.

He is a co-founder of the Ego comme X association. In 1994, the first number of the Ego comme X magazine was released. In it, Fabrice Neaud published his first works. It was the beginning of his Journal (which is a diary in comics), an ambitious autobiographical project. The first volume of the Journal was released in 1996. It got a prize Alph'art (best work by a young artist) in Angoulême in 1997.

Fabrice Neaud keeps on drawing his Journal. Three more volumes have been published between 1998 and 2002. He published also many short stories in Ego comme X, Bananas and other magazines. Some of his works have been translated into Italian and Spanish. A reviewer notes, "But Neaud isn't a simple diarist: he's also an artist concerned with various problems of our society, including homophobia and gay life in small towns." His works have been the subject of academic papers.

== Books ==
- Journal, Ego comme X :
1. Février 1992 – septembre 1993, 1996.
2. Septembre 1993 – décembre 1993, 1998.
3. Décembre 1993 – août 1995, 1999.
4. Les Riches Heures, 2002.
- 12 pages in Neaud/Squarzoni/Mussat, Ego comme X/La Maison des auteurs, 2004, free book with Xavier Mussat and Philippe Squarzoni. Out of print. Free online (in French).
- « La Cité des arbres », in Japon, Casterman, coll. « Écritures », 2005.
- Alex et la vie d'après, story by Thierry Robberecht about AIDS. Free book edited by Ex Aequo, Bruxelles, 2008. Free pdf or online (in French).
- Émile, 32 pages story, in Ego comme x n°7 (2000). Free online in French and in English. Excerpted in No Straight Lines: Four Decades of Queer Comics (2012) and translated by Edward Gauvin.
- Le Dernier Sergent: Les Guerres Immobiles, (2023), Delcourt:
- Nu Men, Quadrants :
1. Guerre urbaine (2012)
2. Quanticafrique (2013)
