= Hiroshi Ando =

Japanese writer and director

- Born: 13 June 1965 (age 61); Tokyo, Japan
- Occupations: Film director Screenwriter
- Years active: 1993-present

Hiroshi Ando (安藤尋, Andō Hiroshi) (born 13 June 1965 in Tokyo, Japan) is a Japanese film director and screenwriter. His film Blue (2002) was entered into the 24th Moscow International Film Festival.

== Early life ==
Whilst at Waseda University, Shinjuku, Ando joined a film studies group. Around 1989, he began working as an assistant director in the adult film industry.

== Filmography ==
Year	Title	Director	Writer	Notes	Ref.
1993	Ultra Abnormal Sex	Yes	No	Pink film	
1997	Pierce: Love & Hate	Yes	No	Pink film	
1999	Dead Beat	Yes	Yes		
1999	Molester Diary 2	Yes	Yes	Pink film	
2002	Blue	Yes	No		
2002	Female Detective	Yes	No	Pink film	
2003	High School Teacher	Yes	No	Pink film	
2003	Mobile Detectives	Co-director	No		
2004	68 Films	No	Yes		
2004	Mind and Body	Yes	Yes		
2005	Zoo	Co-director	No	Segment: "Zoo"	
2006	Mechanical Race Queen	Yes	No	Pink film	
2007	My Sister, My Love	Yes	Yes		
2007	Love Diagnosis	Co-director	No	TV series; 3 episodes	
2011	Mobile Detectives 3	Yes	No		
2013	In the Middle of the Night	Yes	No	Short film	
2014	Initial D Arcade: Stage 8 - Infinity	Yes	No	Video game	
2014	Undulant Fever	Yes	No		
2016	A Flower Aflame	Yes	No		
2017	Moon and Thunder	Yes	No		
2026	A Bouquet of Light for You	Yes	No		
