= Nyx no Lantern =

Japanese manga series

- First tankōbon volume cover

ニュクスの角灯 (Nyukusu no Rantan)
- Genre: Fantasy; Historical; Slice of life
- Manga
- Written by: Kan Takahama
- Published by: Leed Publishing
- Magazine: Monthly Comic Ran
- Original run: March 27, 2015 – June 27, 2019
- Volumes: 6
- icon

Nyx no Lantern (Japanese: ニュクスの角灯, Hepburn: Nyukusu no Rantan; lit. 'Nyx's Lantern') is a Japanese manga series written and illustrated by Kan Takahama. It was serialized in Leed Publishing's Monthly Comic Ran from March 2015 to June 2019, with its chapters collected in six tankōbon volumes

In 2018, Nyx no Lantern won the Excellence Award at the 21st Japan Media Arts Festival, as well as the Grand Prize of the 24th Tezuka Osamu Cultural Prize in 2020.

== Plot ==
In 1878, Miyo, a shy girl who lost her parents in the Satsuma Rebellion, started working at a tool store "Ban" that handles the import and export of handicrafts in Kajiya-cho, Nagasaki. Her beauty gradually grows as she comes in contact with people around her, including her shopkeeper, Koura Momotoshi. At the same time, she begins to be conscious of Momotoshi as her love interest, but Momotoshi cannot stop his feelings for Judith, his first love in Paris, where he used to live.

== Publication ==
Written and illustrated by Kan Takahama, Nyx no Lantern was serialized in Leed Publishing's Monthly Comic Ran from March 27, 2015, to June 27, 2019. Leed Publishing collected its chapters in six tankōbon volumes, released from January 29, 2016, to August 27, 2019.

=== Volumes ===
No.	Japanese release date	Japanese ISBN
1	January 29, 2016	978-4-8458-4421-0
2	July 29, 2016	978-4-8458-4428-9
3	April 6, 2017	978-4-8458-5010-5
4	February 16, 2018	978-4-8458-5180-5
5	November 27, 2018	978-4-8458-6005-0
6	August 27, 2019	978-4-8458-6027-2

== Reception ==
The series was nominated for the 20th Tezuka Osamu Cultural Prize in 2016, and won the Grand Prize in its 24th edition in 2020. The series ranked fourth on "The Best Manga 2017 Kono Manga wo Yome!" ranking by Freestyle magazine. The series was one of the Jury Recommended Works at the 20th Japan Media Arts Festival in 2017, and received an Excellence Award at the 21st edition in 2018. Nyx no Lantern won the Best Miniseries Manga at the Anime Click Awards 2022.

French newspaper Le Figaro selected the series as one of their six recommended manga featured at the 2019 Paris Book Fair.
