= The Supplement =

2002 Polish film

- Directed by: Krzysztof Zanussi
- Written by: Krzysztof Zanussi
- Produced by: Krzysztof Zanussi
- Starring: Pawel Okraska
- Cinematography: Edward Kłosiński
- Music by: Wojciech Kilar
- Production companies: Cinematography Committee APF; Non-Stop Film Service; Wytwórnia Filmów Dokumentalnych i Fabularnych (WFDiF)
- Release date: 12 April 2002
- Running time: 108 minutes
- Country: Poland
- Language: Polish

The Supplement (Polish: Suplement) is a 2002 Polish drama film directed by Krzysztof Zanussi. It was entered into the 24th Moscow International Film Festival where it won the FIPRESCI Special Mention.

== Cast ==
- Pawel Okraska as Filip
- Monika Krzywkowska as Hanka
- Michal Sieczkowski as Patient
- Szymon Bobrowski as Karol
- Karol Urbanski as Andrzej
- Pawel Audykowski as Karol's assistant
- Tadeusz Bradecki as Priest Marek
- Agata Buzek as Fashion Model
- Jerzy Nasierowski as assistant
- Zbigniew Zapasiewicz as Tomasz Berg
