= 24th Moscow International Film Festival =

Film festival

- Location: Moscow, Russia
- Founded: 1959
- Awards: Grand Prix
- Festival date: 21–30 June 2002
- Website: Website

The 24th Moscow International Film Festival was held from 21 to 30 June 2002. The Golden St. George was awarded to the Italian-French film Resurrection directed by Paolo and Vittorio Taviani.

== Jury ==
- Chinghiz Aitmatov (Kyrgyzstan – President of the Jury)
- Fruit Chan (Hong Kong)
- Rakhshan Bani-E'temad (Iran)
- Jessica Hausner (Austria)
- Dominique Borg (France)
- Jos Stelling (Netherlands)
- Randa Haines (United States)
- Karen Shakhnazarov (Russia)

== Films in competition ==
The following films were selected for the main competition:

English title	Original title	Director(s)	Production country
Wishes of the Land	Aye zohaye zamin	Vahid Mousaian	Iran
Blue	Blue	Hiroshi Ando	Japan
Chekhov's Motifs	Chekhovskie motivy	Kira Muratova	Russia, Ukraine
Shake It All About	En kort en lang	Hella Joof	Denmark, Germany
Stripping	Hengittämättä & nauramatta	Saara Saarela	Finland
Everyman's Feast	Jedermanns fest	Fritz Lehner	Austria
The Heart of the Bear	Karu süda	Arvo Iho	Estonia, Russia, Germany, Czech Republic
The Cuckoo	Kukushka	Aleksandr Rogozhkin	Russia
The Seventh Sun of Love	O 7os ilios tou erota	Vangelis Serdaris	Greece
Stereoblood	Odinochestvo krovi	Roman Prygunov	Russia
Resurrection	Resurrezione	Paolo and Vittorio Taviani	Italy, France
The Supplement	Suplement	Krzysztof Zanussi	Poland
The House on Turk Street	The House on Turk Street	Bob Rafelson	United States, Canada, Germany
A Hidden Life	Uma Vida em Segredo	Suzana Amaral	Brazil
The Damned	Zatracení	Dan Svátek	Czech Republic

== Awards ==
- Golden St. George: Resurrection by Paolo and Vittorio Taviani
- Silver St.George:
  - Best Director: Aleksandr Rogozhkin for The Cuckoo
  - Best Actor: Ville Haapasalo for The Cuckoo
  - Best Actress: Mikako Ichikawa for Blue
- Special Jury Prize: Wishes of the Land by Vahid Mousaian
- Stanislavsky Award: Harvey Keitel
- FIPRESCI Prize: The Cuckoo by Aleksandr Rogozhkin
- FIPRESCI Special Mention: The Supplement by Krzysztof Zanussi
