= Sakka (publisher) =

Belgian manga publisher

- Parent company: Casterman
- Country of origin: Belgium
- Headquarters location: Tournai
- Publication types: Books
- Fiction genres: Manga
- Official website: www.sakka.info

Sakka is a Belgian publisher of manga; it is an imprint of Casterman.

== Published titles ==
- Astral Project – Tsuki no Hikari
- Bakegyamon
- Blade of the Immortal
- Bobobo-bo Bo-bobo
- The Book of Human Insects
- Chō Sentō Inu Blanca
- Crayon Shin-chan
- Eagle
- Gon
- Kodoku no Gurume
- Mirai Nikki
- Monokuro Kinderbook
- Skip Beat!
- Toudo no Tabibito
- The World Is Mine
- Under the Same Moon
- Yomawari Sensei
