= Corinne Maier =

French author (born 1963)

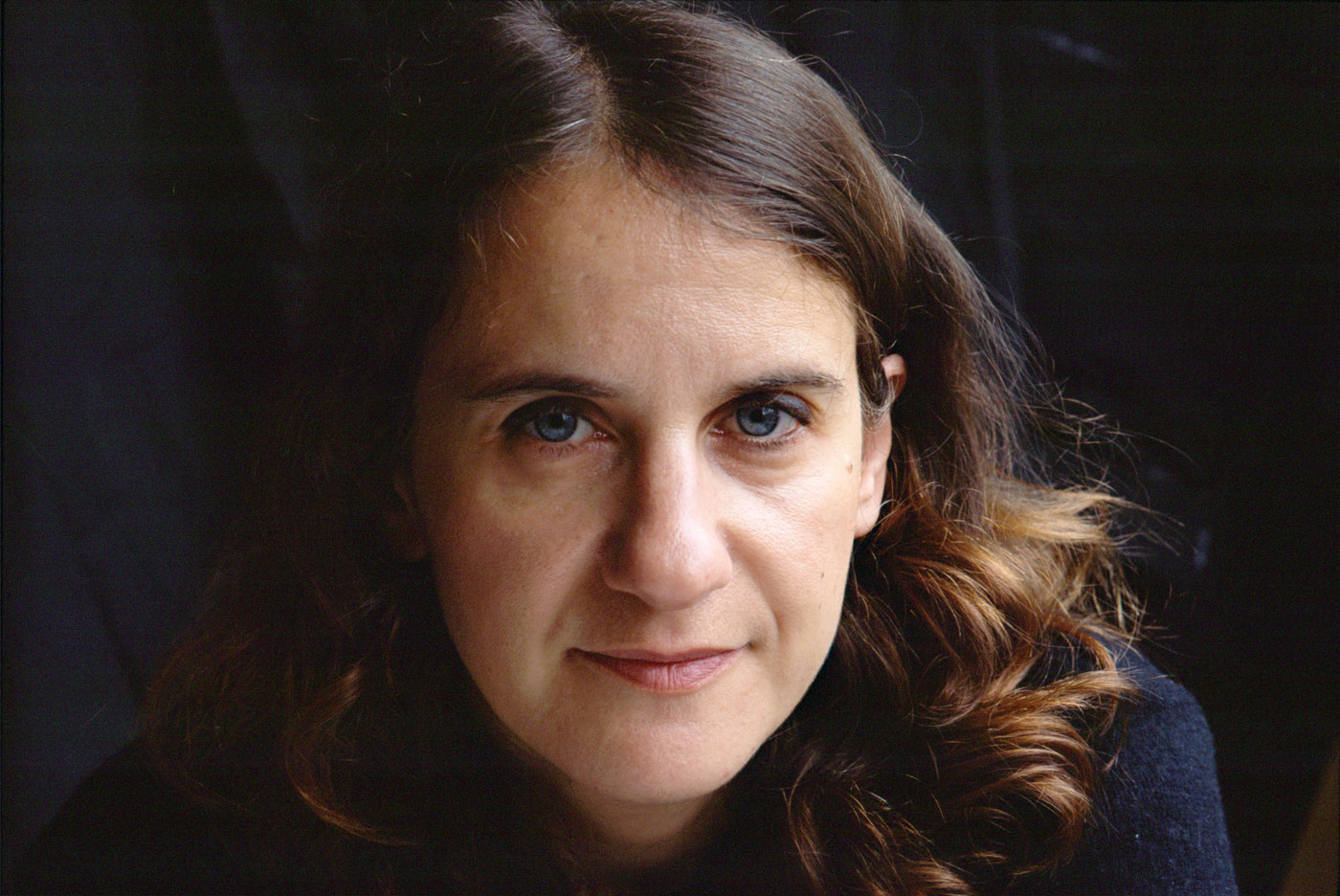
Maier in 2014

Corinne Maier (born 7 December 1963) is a Swiss-born, French psychoanalyst, economist, and best-selling writer. She is best known for being the author of Bonjour paresse, a cynical critique of French corporate culture. In 2016, Maier was named as one of the BBC 100 Women.

== Biography ==
Maier was born on 7 December 1963 in Geneva, Switzerland.

She attended National Foundation of Political Sciences, studying economics and international relations, later earning a doctorate in psychoanalysis. The author of Bonjour paresse [Hello Laziness], Maier is a satirist who has been compared to Scott Adams. She became employed by Électricité de France as an economist c. 1992. In 2004, she wrote Bonjour paresse, which reached the number one ranking on Amazon's French-language bestseller list. In 2016, she was chosen as one of BBC's 100 Women.

Maier is jewish and the mother of two children, a son and a daughter.

== Selected works ==
- 2004, Hello laziness! : why hard work doesn't pay, non-fiction, Orion (GB); 2005, Bonjour Laziness, Pantheon (USA), 2007;
- 2009, No kids, 40 reasons not to have children, non-fiction, Mcclelland & Steward (Canada);
- 2013, Freud, an illustrated biography (scenario), Nobrow (GB);
- 2014, Marx, an illustrated biography (scenario), Nobrow (GB);
- 2016, Einstein, an illustrated biography (scenario), Nobrow (GB)
- 2017, Marx, Freud, Einstein, Heroes of the mind, Nobrow (GB)
- 2021, The Conquest of the red man (novel), Wrecking Ball Press (GB).
