= Ego comme X =

French comics publishing house

Ego comme X was a French comics publisher. It was based and created in Angoulême. It specializes in autobiographical comics, It was led by Xavier Mussat, Fabrice Neaud and Loïc Néhou.

They published English-speaking authors for a few years, like Jeffrey Brown, James Kochalka, Karl Stevens, and John Porcellino. They also published The Man Without Talent, the famous manga series by Yoshiharu Tsuge, only available in Japanese and French.

== History ==
Ego comme X began as an anthology publisher in 1994. It was started by students from the Atelier Bande Dessinée at the École d'Art de GrandAngoulême.

Ego comme X is famous due to the publication of Journal by Fabrice Neaud, co-founder of Ego comme X, which had an important part in the French artistic comics movement of the 1990s.

On October 24, 2016, it was announced that Ego comme X had closed down.
