= Marcel Marlier =

Belgian artist and illustrator

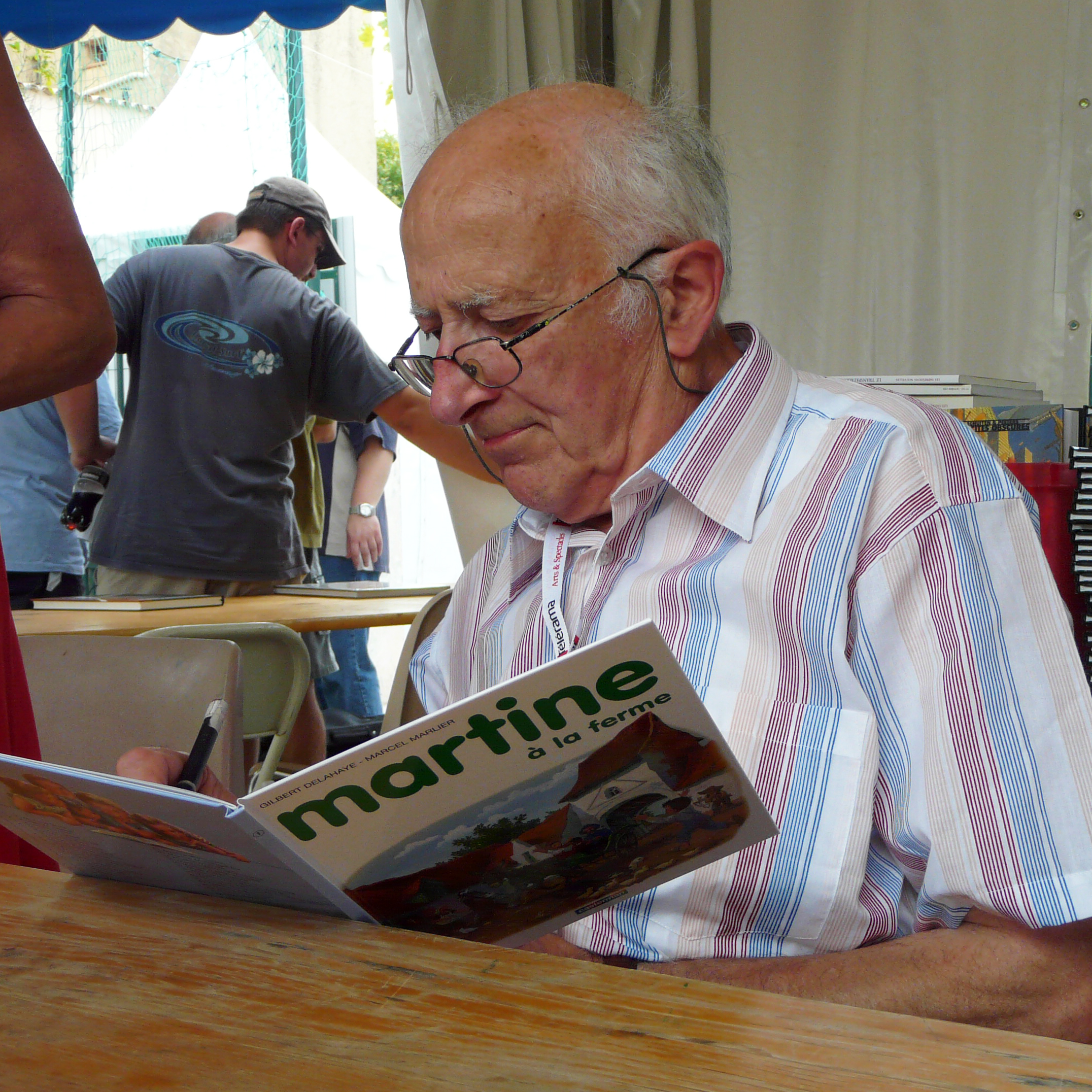
- Marcel Marlier
- Born: 18 November 1930; Herseaux, Belgium
- Died: 18 January 2011 (aged 80); Tournai, Belgium
- Occupations: Belgian Artist and Illustrator

Marcel Marlier (18 November 1930 – 18 January 2011) was a Belgian artist and illustrator.

== Biography ==
He was born in Herseaux, Belgium.

When he was 16, he enrolled in decorative art at Saint-Luc de Tournai. He finished his studies in 1951 with the greatest distinction. He returned as a teacher two years later.

The Belgian publisher La Procure à Namur organised a drawing contest. They were interested in finding talented artists to illustrate works for school children. Marlier won the competition. Two books resulted from this and these books guided a whole generation of Belgian children through the first few years of school, I Read with Michel and Nicole and I Calculate with Michel and Nicole. Marlier's collaboration with La Procure à Namur lasted more than 25 years.

Pierre Servais at Casterman, a Belgian publishing company, began to notice Marlier's drawings in 1951. He suggested that Marlier should illustrate a series of books for children. The result was editions of Alexandre Dumas' adventure books. This was followed in 1953 by illustrations for a book by Jeanne Cappe about two very similar rabbits. Marlier also took part in the Farandole series, intended for children.

From 1954, Marlier illustrated the children's series Martine, with the stories written by Gilbert Delahaye. This series spans over 50 issues and has been translated in numerous languages. In 1969, Marlier also created his own series of children's books, Jean-Lou and Sophie.

He died in Tournai on 18 January 2011.
