= Kiriko Nananan =

Japanese manga artist (1972–2024)

Kiriko Nananan 魚喃 キリコ
- Born: December 14, 1972 Yoshida, Niigata, Japan
- Died: December 25, 2024 (aged 52)
- Area: Manga artist
- Pseudonym: Toko Iwase
- Notable works: Blue; Strawberry Shortcakes

Kiriko Nananan (Japanese: 魚喃 キリコ, Hepburn: Nananan Kiriko; December 14, 1972 – December 25, 2024) was a Japanese manga artist. She was known for her realistic josei work featuring understated artwork with a sense of detachment. In addition, she affiliated herself with the "La nouvelle manga" movement. Nananan died on December 25, 2024; her death was not announced until a year later.

== Biography ==
Nananan was born on December 14, 1972, in the town of Yoshida in Nishikanbara District, Niigata (now Tsubame, Niigata). She had wanted to become a manga artist since she was five years old. She would copy manga for children, girls and adults, and adapt them into her own style. After pitching her manga to several publishers, Nananan's debut work Hole was published in the monthly magazine Garo in 1993. She drew Hole while studying at the Nippon Design Welfare College. Three of her works have been made into live-action films: Blue (2002), Strawberry Shortcakes (2006), and Pumpkin and Mayonnaise (2017). She portrayed Toko in the live-action film adaptation of Strawberry Shortcakes under the stage name Toko Iwase (岩瀬 塔子, Iwase Tōko). Along with Ryo Fukawa, she also hosted the NHK Radio 1 program Doyō no Yoru wa Kētai Tanka. At the 2008 Angoulême International Comics Festival, Nananan won the Prix de l'école supérieure de l'image.

She died on December 25, 2024, at the age of 52. Tokyo News Service announced her death the following year, at the request of Nananan and her family.

== Style ==
Nananan said she was obsessed with seeing everything in-between the lines. She used the spaces in the panels and the backgrounds as characters to suggest feelings such as hope or emptiness. It is for this reason that, unlike most manga artists, she did not have assistants do the details for her, since the little details played an important role in her stories. She drew each panel so that it can be isolated, like a picture on a poster or a T-shirt, rather than drawing her manga as a series of boxes. She has stated that drawing one panel can sometimes take up to four hours, repeating the same picture dozens of times.

Nananan said her stories and characters were only partially fictional, and believed they are all true-to-life. She based her characters' thinking on how she thinks, then linked everything together with fictional events. She felt she could not have writing assistants either since she was the only one who could tell her stories. Nananan cited the manga Pink by Kyoko Okazaki as an inspiration over her work.

Nananan was affiliated with "La nouvelle manga", a movement combining the aesthetics of Franco-Belgian comics and manga.

== Works ==
- Water – short stories / Magazine House, 1996 / ISBN 4-8387-1006-2
- Blue – Magazine House, 1997 / ISBN 4-8387-0896-3
- Itaitashii Love (痛々しいラヴ) – short stories / Magazine House, 1997 / ISBN 4-8387-0937-4
- Haruchin (ハルチン) – one-page gag serial / Magazine House, 1998 / ISBN 4-8387-0967-6
- Kabocha to Mayonnaise (南瓜とマヨネーズ) (also known as Pumpkin and Mayonnaise and Everyday) – short stories / Takarajimasha, 1999 / ISBN 4-7966-1634-9
- Strawberry Shortcakes (also known as Sweet Cream & Red Strawberries) – Shodensha, 2002 / ISBN 4-396-76292-5
- Tanpenshū (短編集) – short stories / Asuka Shinsha, 2003 / ISBN 4-87031-540-8
- 15 – co-author / Seigensha, 2004 / ISBN 978-4-86-152004-4
- Candy no Iro wa Aka (キャンディーの色は赤。) – Shodensha 2007, serialized in Feel Young / ISBN 978-4-39-676412-8
- Tokyo no Otokonoko (東京の男の子) – with Nyū Ōkubo and Marie Abiko / Ohta Publishing, 2008 / ISBN 978-4-77-831119-3
- Chiisana Suzie (ちいさなスージー) – picture book / Shodensha, 2009 / ISBN 978-4-39-643023-8
- Tachihara Michizō Shishū: Boku wa Hitori de Yoru ga Hirogaru (立原道造詩集 僕はひとりで夜がひろがる) – illustrator / Parco Publishing, 2010 / ISBN 978-4-89-194820-7
- Nananan Kiriko Mishūroku Sakuhinshū (魚喃キリコ 未収録作品集) – Tokyo News Service, 2020 / ISBN 978-4-06-520259-3, 978-4-06-520296-8
