= Martine (character) =

Book character by Belgian illustrator Marcel Marlier

- Martine character
- The main characters with the series logo
- First appearance: 1954
- Last appearance: 2014
- Created by: Gilbert Delahaye
- Designed by: Marcel Marlier

In-universe information
- Species: Human
- Gender: Female
- Family: 2 brothers, Jean and Alain

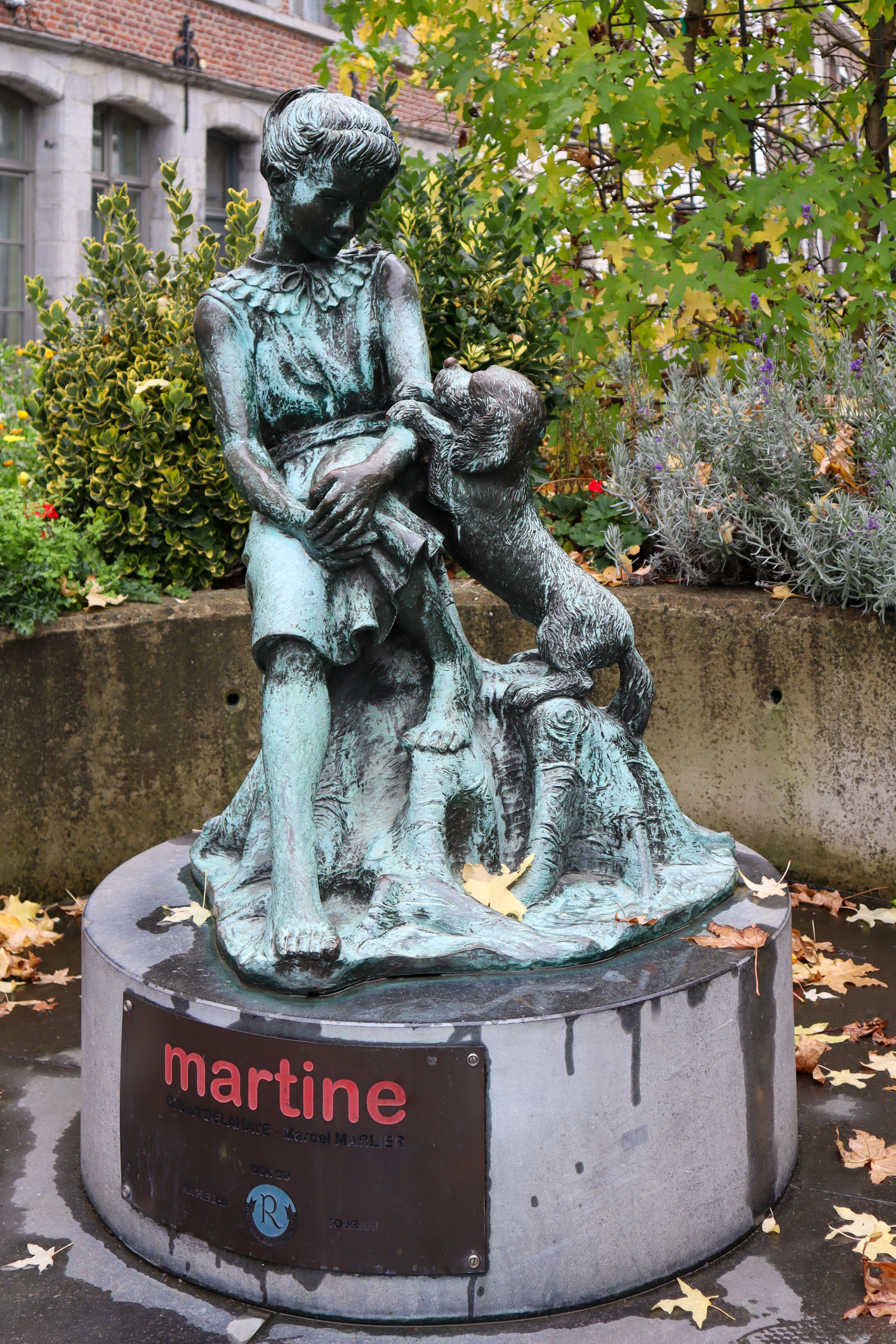
Statue of Martine in Tournai

Martine is the title character in a series of books for children originally written in French by the Belgians Marcel Marlier and Gilbert Delahaye and published by Casterman. The first album, Martine à la ferme (Martine at the farm), was published in 1954, followed by 59 other books, which have been translated into many different languages. The book series has sold about 100 million copies and is one of the best-selling book series. When the author Gilbert Delahaye died in 1997, Jean-Louis Marlier, the son of Marcel Marlier, continued to write the stories. The series ended in 2011 when the illustrator Marcel Marlier died at the age of 80. The last book is the 60th, Martine et le prince mystérieux (Martine and the Mysterious Prince), published in 2010. The albums continue to be published.

The character was renamed for different languages and markets. For examples, Martine was named "Emma" for English-speaking audiences in Europe for video games and "Debbie" for the U.S. market.

== Other media ==
A 3D animated series directed by Claude Allix and produced by Les Armateurs, recounting the adventures of Martine and her friends, was launched on August 27, 2012 on M6, and in Quebec from September 15, 2012 on Télé-Québec.

Two video games were released based on the character: Emma at the Farm and Emma in the Mountains, both for the Nintendo DS handheld system. The games are based on the first and eighth books respectively. The games were announced for release in the U.S. in 2008.

== Albums ==
- Martine à la ferme (1954)
- Martine en voyage (1954)
- Martine à la mer (1955)
- Martine au cirque (1956)
- Martine, vive la rentrée! (1957)
- Martine à la foire (1958)
- Martine fait du théâtre (1959)
- Martine à la montagne (1959)
- Martine fait du camping (1960)
- Martine en bateau (1961)
- Martine et les 4 saisons (1962)
- Martine à la maison (1963)
- Martine au zoo (1963)
- Martine fait ses courses (1964)
- Martine en avion (1965)
- Martine monte à cheval (1965)
- Martine au parc (1965)
- Martine petite maman (1968)
- Martine fête son anniversaire (1969)
- Martine embellit son jardin (1970)
- Martine fait de la bicyclette (1971)
- Martine petit rat de l'opéra (1972)
- Martine à la fête des fleurs (1973)
- Martine fait la cuisine (1974)
- Martine apprend à nager (1975)
- Martine est malade (1976)
- Martine chez tante Lucie (1977)
- Martine prend le train (1978)
- Martine fait de la voile (1979)
- Martine et son ami le moineau (1980)
- Martine et l'âne Cadichon (1981)
- Martine fête maman (1982)
- Martine en montgolfière (1983)
- Martine à l'école (1984)
- Martine découvre la musique (1985)
- Martine a perdu son chien (1986)
- Martine dans la forêt (1987)
- Martine et le cadeau d'anniversaire (1988)
- Martine a une étrange voisine (1989)
- Martine, un mercredi pas comme les autres (1990)
- Martine, la nuit de Noël (1991)
- Martine va déménager (1992)
- Martine se déguise (1993)
- Martine et le chaton vagabond (1994)
- Martine, il court, il court le furet (1995)
- Martine, l'accident (1996)
- Martine baby-sitter (1997)
- Martine en classe de découverte (1998)
- Martine, la leçon de dessin (1999)
- Martine au pays des contes (2000)
- Martine et les marmitons (2001)
- La surprise (2002)
- L'arche de Noé (2003)
- Martine princesses et chevaliers (2004)
- Martine, drôles de fantômes ! (2005)
- Martine à l'cinse (Martine à la ferme in Ch'ti) (2006)
- Un amour de poney (2006)
- J’adore mon frère (2007)
- Martine et un chien du tonnerre (2008)
- Martine protège la nature (2009)
- Martine et le prince mystérieux (2010)
- L’Album de l'année
- La Nuit de Noël (édition spéciale)

== Martine in other languages ==
When translating children's books, foreign/unknown names are usually replaced by popular names from the target language. For example, the French-speaking Martine changed to "Tiny" in Dutch.

Martine appeared in almost 40 different languages, of which the ones below with their corresponding names.

- Albanian: Zana
- Alsatian: Martine
- American English: Debbie, Emma (in Nintendo video games)
- Arabic as published in Lebanon: تولين (Touline)
- British English: Martine, Mary, Emma (in Nintendo video games)
- Catalan: Martine, Mireia, Mariona
- Croatian: Maja
- Czech: Martinka
- Chinese: 玛蒂娜 (Martina)
- Danish: Mimi
- Dutch: Tiny
- German: Martina, Steffi, Petra
- Finnish: Martine
- French: Martine
- Galician: Martina
- Greek: Μαρίλη (Marili), Λιλίκα (Lilika)
- Hebrew: מירי (Miriam)
- Hungarian: Márti
- Irish language: Máirín
- Icelandic: Margrét
- Indonesian: Tini
- Italian: Martita, Cristina
- Japanese: マルチ (Martine)
- Lithuanian: Elenyté
- Macedonian: Марика (Marika), Мартина (Martina)
- Malesian: Martini
- Picard: Martine
- Polish: Martynka
- Portuguese: Anita
- Romanian: Andreea
- Russian: Маруся (Marusya [mɐˈrusʲə])
- Serbian: Maja
- Slovak: Martinka
- Slovene: Marinka
- Spanish: Martita, Carolina, Martina
- Turkish: Ayşegül
- Welsh: Siani
- Swedish: Mimmi
