= Bandai Bridge =

Bandai Bridge 萬代橋
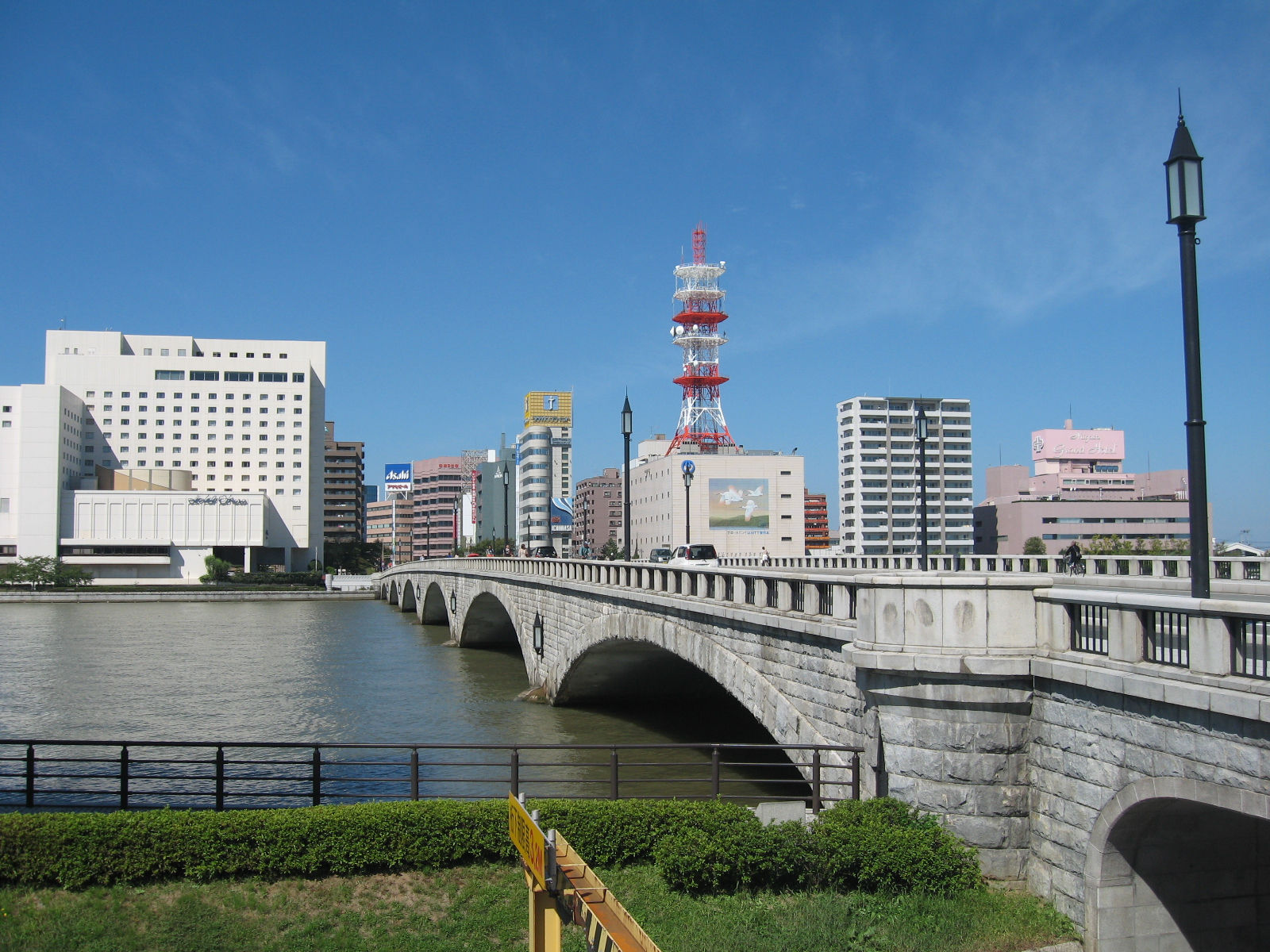
- The Bandai Bridge seen from the right bank
- Coordinates: 37°55′10″N 139°03′11″E
- Crosses: Shinano River

Characteristics
- Material: Reinforced concrete
- Total length: 306.9 metres (1,007 ft)
- Width: 21.9 metres (72 ft)
- No. of spans: 6

History
- Inaugurated: 1886
- Rebuilt: 1929

Location
- Interactive map of Bandai Bridge

The Bandai Bridge (萬代橋, Bandai-bashi) is a bridge crossing the Shinano River in Niigata, Niigata Prefecture, Japan via National Route 7. The current bridge was constructed in 1929, and was designated as a nationally Important Cultural Property in July 2004.

== Outline ==
The current bridge contains six arches and is made of reinforced concrete with granite siding. It is 306.9 meters long, 21.9 meters wide, and has two car lanes in each direction. The Bandai Bridge is a prime example of large-scale concrete arch bridges from the Showa Period, and was strong enough not to collapse during the 1964 Niigata earthquake which destroyed large sections of Niigata.

Today the Bandai Bridge is considered the symbol of the city of Niigata and is one of the city's most scenic spots, especially when lit up at night.

In April 2004, the bridge celebrated its 75th anniversary by being designated as a national Important Cultural Property. This same year, much of the bridge was reconstructed to resemble the original model.

== Geography ==
The Bandai Bridge is located on the Shinano River, and is separated from the river mouth by only the Yachiyo and Ryuto bridges. North of the bridge are the Furumachi and Honcho shopping districts, and south of the bridge are the Bandai shopping district, the Niigata West Port (Bandaijima) district, and Niigata Station. Japan National Route 7 crosses the bridge, connecting Niigata Station to the areas south of the Shinano River.

== First incarnation ==
The first Bandai Bridge was constructed out of wood in 1886, during the Meiji Period, and was the first bridge to cross the Shinano River.

Because of the inconvenience of crossing the river by boat between Niigata and former Nuttari, the heads of Niigata Nippo newspaper and Daishi Ginko bank oversaw construction to encourage trade between the two communities. The original bridge was 782 meters long, the longest bridge in Japan at the time, and 2.5 times the current length as the river has grown significantly narrower since.

Possibly because of high tolls on the privately owned bridge, in the beginning there were few users. In 1900, the prefectural government took over control of the bridge's finances and made it toll-free.

In March 1908, a major fire which destroyed 1,770 houses in Niigata also destroyed more than half of the Bandai Bridge.

== Second incarnation ==
The second Bandai Bridge was completed in December 1909, and quickly became the transportation hub of the growing city of Niigata. The new bridge was built using planks recovered from the remains of the 1908 fire as a base, and was the same size as the original model.

Pieces of the first and second incarnations of the Bandai Bridge can be seen on display in the underground crossing of the Bandai shopping district.

== Third (current) incarnation ==
Due to dilapidation of the second bridge, a third version was constructed in 1929 using reinforced concrete. Because of water diversion projects along the Shinano River throughout the early 20th century, the water level at the time of construction had decreased from 770 meters to 270 meters since the construction of the first bridge. Because of this, the third bridge was far shorter yet wider in order to allow for easy passage of automobiles.

On August 28, 1948, during the Niigata Festival a fireworks accident on the bridge caused over 100 spectators to fall into the Shinano River, resulting in 29 casualties. Since then, all bridges across the river have become off limits to spectators during fireworks shows.

On June 16, 1964, a magnitude 7.5 earthquake hit Niigata, causing major damage to nearly all bridges on the Shinano River. Although the base of the Bandai Bridge on both sides sunk approximately 1.2 meters, the bridge was left intact. Because automobiles were still able to cross the Bandai Bridge (and only the Bandai Bridge), it allowed for quick aid to arrive for many on the isolated north side of the river.

In 1985, to celebrate the 100th anniversary of the first bridge, new lanterns were added to the bridge to decorate the night skies. In August 1989, a folk-dance procession across the bridge was started as part as the annual Niigata Festival, and is now one of the festival's trademarks.
