= Bonjour paresse =

Book by Corinne Maier

Bonjour Laziness
- Author: Corinne Maier
- Original title: Bonjour paresse
- Translator: David Watson, Sophie Hawkes
- Language: French
- Publisher: Editions Michalon
- Publication date: 2004
- Publication place: France
- English publication date: 2005
- Pages: Approx. 144

Bonjour paresse ("Hello Laziness") is the title of an international bestseller by Corinne Maier, a French writer, psychoanalyst, and economist.

The book is a highly cynical and humorous critique of work and contemporary French corporate culture (epitomized for Maier by the middle manager) that advocates various ways of undermining the system. Maier advocates that it is in the reader's best interest to work as little as possible. The title is a reference to Françoise Sagan's novel Bonjour Tristesse. It is variously subtitled Jumping Off the Corporate Ladder, or Why Hard Work Doesn’t Pay depending on the edition. Because of their similar attitudes towards the workplace, Maier has been frequently compared to Dilbert creator Scott Adams.

Maier was subjected to a disciplinary hearing on 17 August 2004 by her employer, Électricité de France, for the writing and publication of Bonjour Paresse. The French newspaper Le Monde ran a front page article about the dispute at the end of July 2004, which did much to publicize the work.

== English translations ==
Bonjour Paresse has been translated by David Watson (as Hello Laziness) for The Orion Publishing Group Ltd in the United Kingdom, and in the United States by Sophie Hawkes (as Bonjour Laziness) for Random House.
