= Ben Potter =

American internet personality (1984–2024)

- Born: May 18, 1984; Rhode Island, U.S.
- Died: June 8, 2024 (aged 40); Colorado, U.S.
- Occupations: YouTuber; United States Infantry soldier; podcaster

YouTube information
- Channels: Comicstorian; Mangastorian; Eligible Monster | Gaming Lore
- Years active: 2014–2024
- Subscribers: 3.12 million
- Views: 1.13 billion
- Last updated: January 23, 2026

Benny Potter (May 18, 1984 – June 8, 2024), also known as Comicstorian and Mangastorian, was an American internet personality who posted commentary about comic books, primarily Marvel Comics and DC Comics, on YouTube.

== Early life ==
Potter was born on May 18, 1984, and grew up in Rhode Island; his interest in comic books began from reading those that his father collected. He later stopped reading comics after the Clone Saga became too convoluted for him to follow. In the mid-2000s, he was deployed to Afghanistan and worked at a military hospital, serving as a United States Infantry soldier, where he started reading comics again because 52 was easier to understand.

== YouTube career ==
After retiring from the military, he began the Comicstorian channel in 2014. The idea for the channel came from his struggles to get back into comics and his wife wanting to understand superhero movies without having to read the comics. At the time of his death, his channel had over three million subscribers.

Additionally, Potter ran several other channels, including Eligible Monster Gaming and Mangastorian. He also created and hosted the Weekly Pull podcast.

== Death ==
Potter died in a car accident on Interstate 25 in Colorado on June 8, 2024, at the age of 40, when his car crossed off the road and flipped several times. The team behind the channel stated that they would continue it in some capacity despite his death.
