= Gilbert Delahaye =

Belgian writer

- Born: 19 March 1923; Franqueville-Saint-Pierre, France
- Died: 6 December 1997 (aged 74)

Gilbert Delahaye (19 March 1923 – 6 December 1997) was a Belgian author. He is best known for the Martine books, a series of illustrated children's stories he prepared with artist Marcel Marlier.

== In popular culture ==
His book, Martine à la ferme, appears in the 2002 French film, L'Auberge espagnole. A principal character in the film (Audrey Tautou) states that she was named after Delahaye's Martine.
