= Furumachi (Niigata) =

Coordinates: 37°55′18″N 139°02′41″E

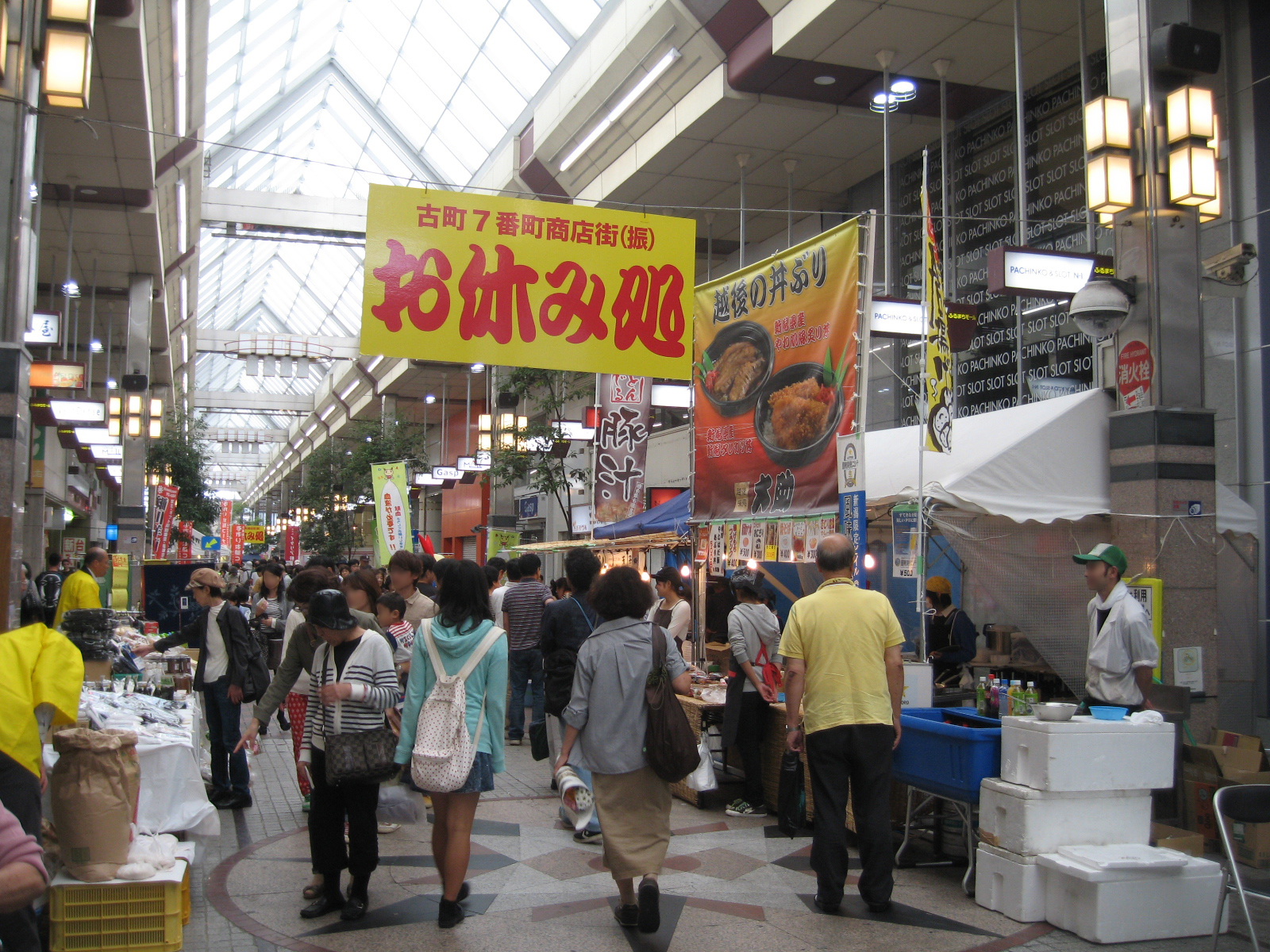
Furumachi-dori Shopping Mall, Niigata City

Furumachi (古町, Furu-machi), literally meaning "Old Town", is the name of a central business district in Niigata City, Niigata Prefecture, Japan. The district is centered on Furumachi-dori street and extends north to Honcho-dori street and south to Nishibori-dori street. Furumachi is located north of the Bandai Bridge and Shinano River, and is one of two major commercial areas of Niigata City, the other being Bandai City south of the river.
