= Murena (comic book) =

Historical comic

Publication information
- Publisher: Dargaud (in French); Europe Comics (in English)
- Genre: Historical fiction
- Publication date: 1997
- Number of issues: 13 as of 2026
- Main character(s): Lucius Murena; Nero; Aggripina; Poppée

Creative team
- Writer(s): Jean Dufaux
- Artist(s): Philippe Delaby (1997-2013); Theo Caneschi (2013-)
- Colorist(s): Philippe Delaby (1997-); Béatrice Delpire (1997); Benn (1999); Kathelyn Dina (2001–2002); Jérémy Petiqueux (2006–2009)

Murena is Belgian comic book written by Jean Dufaux and drawn by Philippe Delaby. The series is set in ancient Rome, around 54 AD, when Emperor Nero seized power. The strip is mainly characterized by its realistic style and the additional historical information. The first volume was published by Dargaud in 1997. After the death of Phillipe Delaby in 2014, Theo Caneschi took over as the series' artist.

== Synopsis ==
The story begins in ancient Rome during the reign of Emperor Claudius. The Emperor fell in love with a young woman, leaving alone the terrible Agrippina and her adopted son, the future Emperor Nero. After Claudius was murdered, Nero ascends the throne and becomes the prey of madness, real or imagined, that consumes him. Through these episodes, we see how Nero, by a combination of circumstances, becomes more and more evil. A game of manipulation and revenge begins...

== Characters ==
- Lucius Murena: hero of the series, the patrician son of Lollia Paulina and friend of Nero. He cannot accept the love that brings the Emperor to his mother.
- Britannicus: the son of Claudius. Because of his parentage, he blocks the way to the throne to Nero and, thereby, to his mother.
- Claudius: Roman emperor, the fifth Caesar of Rome.
- Agrippina: ambitious woman with fatal beauty. She never ceases to recognize his son as the sole heir to the empire.
- Nero : young man crushed by the influence of his mother, he first obeys to his mother and be an accomplice of the most terrible acts, but
- Balba: former gladiator who wants to take his revenge against Nero.
- Massam: a cruel gladiator in the service of Nero.

== Development ==
The authors define their work as being like the novels of Alexandre Dumas, who "took pleasure in following history but kept independent from its sources."

== Glossary ==
At the end of each volume, a glossary defines the Latin words used or the precise historical context of a scene. It is sometimes followed by an erratum when an inaccuracy in a previous album was reported to the writer.

== Reception ==
Murena has received universal critical acclaim from Belgian and French critique and newspapers:

- "Murena is an excellent epic" Lire
- "Murena the historical epic is the best I have ever discovered." Michael Green, professor of Roman history at King's College, Oxford, historical consultant on the film Gladiator.
- "A great history lesson transcended by the breathtaking graphics of Delaby" Page des librairies.
- "A history lesson in the extent of human folly" Le Monde
- "If I taught in a High school, I will certainly give Murena to my students." Jean-Paul Thuillier, Professor and Director of the Department of Science from Antiquity of the Ecole Normale Supérieure in Paris.

== Volumes ==
=== First cycle: Cycle of the Mother ===
1. La Pourpre et l’Or (The Purple and the Gold) (1997, ISBN 2-87129-116-0)
2. De sable et de sang (Of Blood and Sand) (1999, ISBN 2-87129-173-X)
3. La Meilleure des mères (The Best of Mothers) (2001, ISBN 2-87129-302-3)
4. Ceux qui vont mourir... (Those Who Are About to Die...) (2002, ISBN 2-87129-457-7)

=== Second cycle: Cycle of the Wife ===
1. La Déesse Noire (The Black Goddess) (2005, ISBN 2-87129-762-2)
2. Le Sang des Bêtes (The Blood of Animals) (2006, ISBN 978-2-505-00072-3)
3. Vie des Feux (Life of Fires) (2009, ISBN 978-2-505-00686-2)
4. Revanche des Cendres (Revenge of the Ashes) (2010, ISBN 978-2-505-01016-6)

=== Special editions ===
1. Les Épines (The Thorns) (2013, ISBN 978-2-505-01652-6)
