= Kazu Yuzuki =

Japanese manga artist (1954–2024)

- ユズキ カズ
- Born: 1954; Sagara, Shizuoka Prefecture, Japan
- Died: 10 September 2024 (aged 69–70)
- Occupation: Manga artist

Kazu Yuzuki (Japanese: ユズキ カズ Yuzuki Kazu; 1954 – 10 September 2024) was a Japanese manga artist. Yuzuki died on 10 September 2024. He began his collaboration with the magazine Garo in 1981.

== Selected works ==
- Biwa no kinoshitade (2001)
- Mizumachi (2003)
