= Casterman =

Belgian book/comics publisher

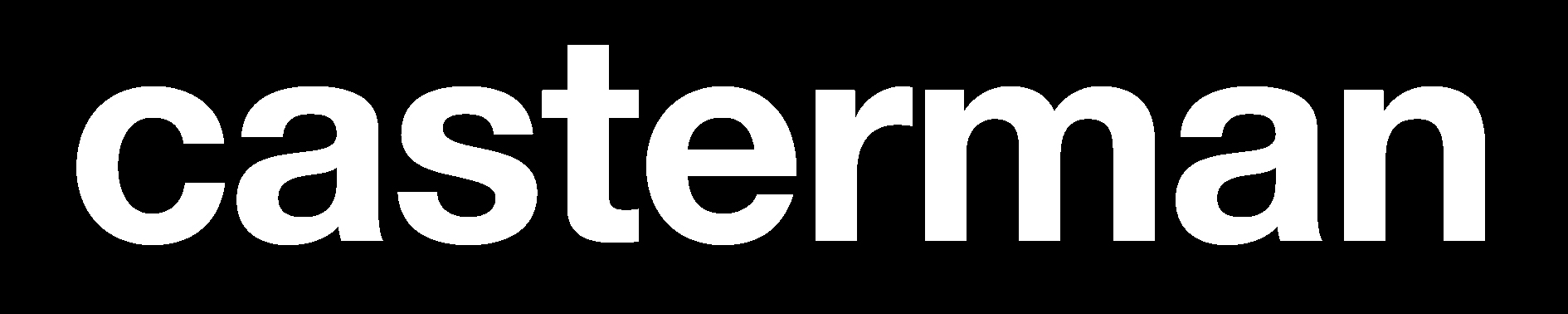
- Parent company: Flammarion
- Founded: 1780; 1934 as a comics publisher
- Founder: Donat-Joseph Casterman
- Country of origin: Belgium
- Headquarters location: Tournai
- Key people: Louis-Robert Casterman
- Publication types: Comic books, children's literature
- Imprints: Sakka
- Official website: www.casterman.com

Casterman is a publisher of Franco-Belgian comics, specializing in comic books and children's literature. The company is based in Tournai, 90 kilometres southwest of the centre of Brussels, Belgium.

== History ==
Galerie Henri Casterman

The company was founded in 1780 by Donat-Joseph Casterman, who began as a bookseller and binder before moving into publishing and printing. As a printing company and publishing house, Casterman positioned itself in the market for books aimed at children, which developed in the 19th century despite Belgium's relatively late adoption of compulsory schooling. The firm's colour printing technology enabled it to produce the richly-decorated covers known as cartonnages romantiques. Michael Twyman has compared the visual vocabulary used in Casterman's book covers to that of French publishers such as Mame of Tours (a leader in the mass production of books).

In the 20th century the firm was important in the career of Hergé. In 1934, Casterman took over the Le Petit Vingtième editions for the publication of the albums of The Adventures of Tintin, from the fourth album of the series, Cigars of the Pharaoh. From 1942, Casterman published reworked versions and colored versions of the previous Tintin albums.

Strengthened by the success of Hergé's comics, shortly after, Casterman proposed new series with new authors such as Jacques Martin, François Craenhals and C. & V. Hansen. From 1954 on, Casterman published children's books, as well, including the successful Martine books by Marcel Marlier and the Cadet- Rama books written by Alain Gree (units Achille et Bergamote and Petit Tom).

Keen to appeal to a more mature market, Casterman decided in 1973 to publish the first albums of Corto Maltese by the Italian author Hugo Pratt. In approximately 1975 to 1976, Casterman began to change their logo to the current one seen today. This old logo looked like the current one, but rather with capitalized, thinner and slightly more spaced out letters. In 1978, Casterman established its monthly magazine A Suivre, which was to influence the comics revival of the 1980s. Casterman ceased the publication of A Suivre in 1997.

Casterman's manga series are published under the imprint Sakka.

== Main publications ==
=== Comics series ===
This is a selected list of comics series, ordered by year of first publication by Casterman, with main authors given. A few series were also continued or temporarily taken over by other artists and writers.

- 1929: The Adventures of Tintin by Hergé
- 1930: Quick & Flupke by Hergé
- 1934: Popol Out West by Hergé
- 1949: The Adventures of Alix by Jacques Martin
- 1952: The Adventures of Jo, Zette and Jocko by Hergé
- 1958: Rasmus Klump by Carla and Vilhelm Hansen
- 1973: Yakari by Job and Derib, Joris Chamblain
- 1975: Corto Maltese by Hugo Pratt
- 1976: The Extraordinary Adventures of Adèle Blanc-Sec by Jacques Tardi
- 1978: Inspector Canardo by Benoît Sokal
- 1983: Le Chat by Philippe Geluck
- 1986: Chninkel by Jean Van Hamme and Grzegorz Rosiński

=== Books series ===
- 1954: Martine by Marcel Marlier and Gilbert Delahaye
- 2004: CHERUB by Robert Muchamore
- 2010: Henderson's Boys by Robert Muchamore

=== Magazines ===
- 1975: Fluide Glacial
- 1978: À Suivre
- 2003: Bang !
- 2016: Pandora

== Archive ==
Casterman is no longer a family firm. It became part of Groupe Flammarion, which since 2012 has been part of Groupe Madrigall, the parent company of several publishing houses. The company archive however has remained in Tournai, where it is now housed in a branch of the Belgian State Archives. Although the archive has yet to be fully catalogued, it has been assessed as being remarkably complete.
