= Les Aventures d'Attila =

French-Belgian comic strip series

- The main character Attila on a collection album cover
- Illustrator(s): Derib (1967–1973); Didgé (1987)
- Genre(s): Bandes dessinées; Humorous adventure

Les Aventures d'Attila (in English: The Adventures of Attila), also known as Attila, is a Franco-Belgian comic series of humorous animal adventures created in 1967 by Belgian scriptwriter Maurice Rosy and Swiss illustrator Derib in Spirou No. 1531. From 1968 onwards, Maurice Kornblum joined as a co-writer for the series. Didgé took over drawing duties in 1987 for a final story.

The series features Attila, a dog and spy for the Swiss army, whose mental faculties have been enhanced, including the ability to speak, rendering him the army's most valuable asset. He is accompanied by his handler, Ernest Bourrillon, a former quartermaster. In the second album, Attila adopts a young boy named Odée. In the subsequent album, they are assisted by another spy dog, designated as Z14, created by Professor Comant.

The series was first published in Spirou from 1967 to 1973 and then again in 1987. It was subsequently released in paperback by Dupuis in 1969 and, by 1974, four albums had been published. An anthology was released in 2010. In that same year, La Vache qui médite published the fifth previously unreleased story in album form.

The series, originally grounded in comedy derived from the contrast between Attila's status as a real dog and a highly trained spy, gradually transitioned into the domain of science fiction. This shift in genre gave rise to disagreements between the writers Rosy-Kornblum and artist Derib, ultimately leading to the series' untimely conclusion, despite its esteemed position among comic aficionados as a work destined to become a classic.

== Description ==
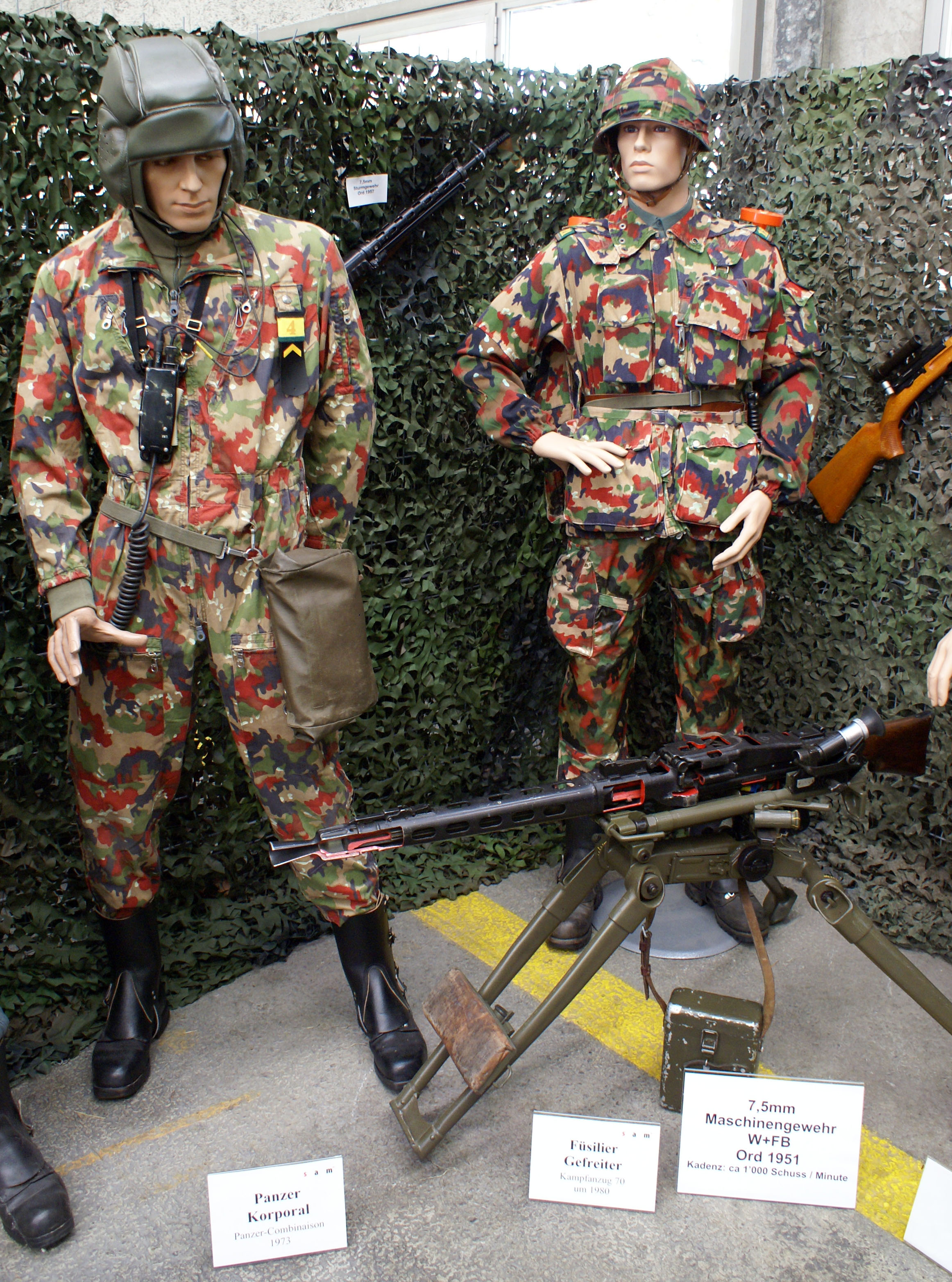
Swiss army combat outfits in the 1970s and 80s.

=== Synopsis ===
The series chronicles the exploits of Attila, a canine chosen for his remarkable intellect and capacity for verbal communication, who is deployed by the Swiss military as an intelligence operative. His mandate is to safeguard the confidential information of the Swiss Confederation from external threats.

=== Characters ===
- Attila was selected from a pool of thousands of canine candidates based on his exceptional qualities. In addition to his ability to speak, he is also capable of reading and writing and has a command of the four national languages of Switzerland: French, German, Italian, and Romansh. Furthermore, his cognitive abilities have been augmented. However, he displays a lack of discipline and frequently engages in implausible pursuits rather than identifying adversaries.
- Ernest Bourrillon, Attila's owner, had previously been employed at a local animal shelter. He was subsequently recruited by the Swiss army after Attila was observed making a telephone call in the middle of the night. He is wont to recount anecdotes in situations of gravity. Subsequently, he assumes the role of legal guardian to Odée, a naive young boy with a penchant for fairy tales, who first appears in the second album. Odée was exploited by his initial guardian, Grismouron, who sought to inherit Odée's wealth, which includes a castle with clandestine subterranean corridors rumored to contain a concealed fortune.
- Z14 is another canine spy, who, like Attila, is capable of speech. He was created by Professor Comant, a scientist who frequently engages in paranormal mysteries, to safeguard Odée. Z14 is a diminutive, white, and disgruntled dog, yet he proves to be a valuable asset in protecting Odée. Labouf and Lerazé are two malevolent characters of limited intelligence. Labouf is preoccupied with consuming sandwiches, while Lerazé spends his time admonishing him.

== History ==
=== Beginnings ===
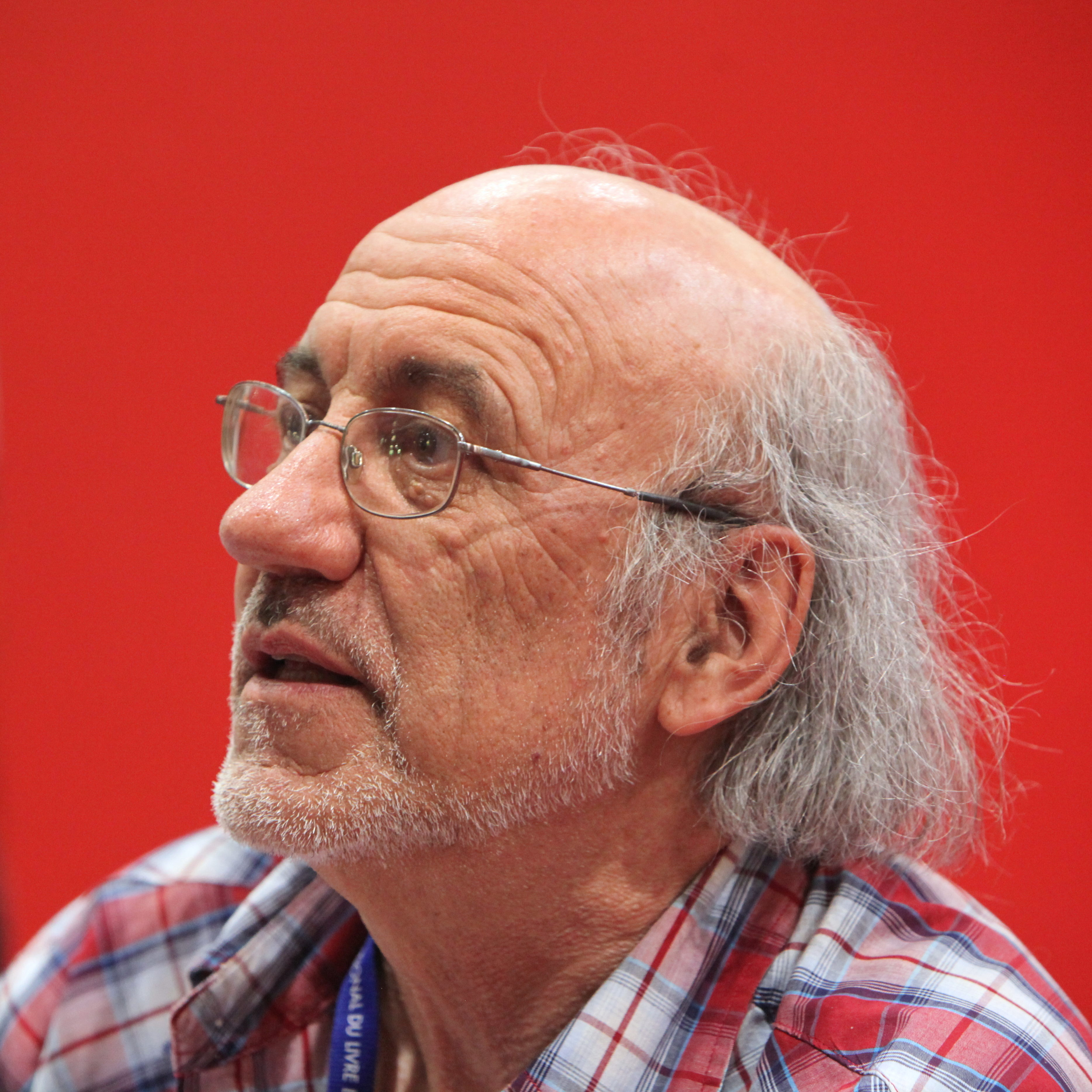
Derib, the series' illustrator, in 2011.

By the end of 1966, Derib, who was still engaged in inking the Smurfs with Peyo, aspired to establish his series. At the time, it was exceedingly challenging to secure publication in Spirou, which was under the editorial direction of Yvan Delporte. The magazine was experiencing a period of considerable popularity, with a successful series featured in nearly every issue. Derib initially aspired to create a Western series, but the genre was already well-represented in Spirou by Lucky Luke, created by Morris, and Jerry Spring, created by Jijé. Instead, he opted to illustrate a medieval series, Arnaud de Casteloup, with a script by Charles Jadoul, which permitted him to depict horses, a subject close to his heart. At Spirou, Derib encountered Maurice Rosy, the artistic director of Dupuis for the past ten years and author of numerous series in the magazine, including Bobo and Tif et Tondu. Rosy postulated that Derib's style was better suited to comedy and, based on Derib's expressed desire to draw animals, created a talking dog for him, named Attila. Rosy found the concept of a talking dog interacting with humans to be an intriguing one. The project was initiated, and Derib dedicated several weeks to developing character designs. Through consultation with Delporte, Rosy became aware of Derib's Swiss nationality, which prompted him to situate the series within the context of Switzerland, a country that had been infrequently represented in comic books. Consequently, the canine espionage protagonist was granted Swiss nationality. The initial adventure of the series was initiated under the guidance of Delporte, as documented in Spirou issue number [...] The series debuted on August 17, 1967, with Attila on the cover. This inaugural issue was noteworthy for its inclusion alongside other prominent series such as Buck Danny, Gil Jourdan, Tif et Tondu, Marc Dacier, and Le Vieux Nick, as well as gag series like Gaston Lagaffe, Boule et Bill, and Poussy.

The inaugural adventure of the series was created under the guidance of Yvan Delporte and first appeared in Spirou magazine. The issue, dated August 17, 1967, was notable for featuring the character on its cover. This marked a pivotal moment for the series, as it was featured alongside other esteemed titles such as Buck Danny, Gil Jourdan, Tif et Tondu, Marc Dacier, and Le Vieux Nick, as well as gag-based series like Gaston Lagaffe, Boule et Bill, and Bizu. The series was regarded as a notable and welcome addition to the 1967 offerings of Spirou, a publication that was facing challenges in maintaining a fresh and engaging lineup. Attila, Les Petits Hommes, and Bizu were the only new inclusions in the magazine at the time. In terms of narrative style, Maurice Rosy opted to establish a fantastical ambiance, a genre he had previously explored in some of his Tif et Tondu stories, which he was concurrently developing alongside Attila. In this inaugural narrative, Derib's artistic style remained closely aligned with that of his mentor, Peyo. The initial narrative was concluded in the aforementioned issue. The date is 1551, which corresponds to January 4, 1968. Subsequently, the pair produced a second episode, demonstrating an increasing proficiency in their collaborative process. The collaboration proceeded as follows: Additionally, Rosy, a gifted artist in his own right, provided a comprehensive and meticulously detailed storyboard of the narrative, which Derib was at liberty to adapt and alter as he saw fit. The second story, Attila au château, was published in Spirou from issue number 1574 on June 13, 1968, to issue number 1595 on November 7, 1968. That same year, the first two stories were published as albums.

=== The arrival of the third man ===
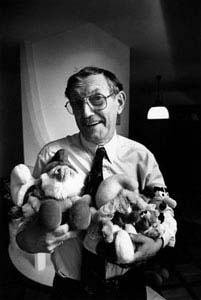
Peyo, one of Derib's instructors. Derib leaves his studio to create his series.

Towards the conclusion of the 1960s, there was a discernible evolution occurring within the Franco-Belgian comics landscape. While Spirou magazine was reaching the end of its Golden Age, the French magazine Pilote was effecting a radical transformation of the profession of comic book authorship. It was during this period of upheaval that Maurice Rosy initiated a reevaluation of his professional trajectory. Having worked for over twelve years as an idea generator for Dupuis Editions, he was experiencing difficulties in maintaining inspiration, particularly in the wake of the events of May 68. He subsequently encountered Maurice Kornblum, a proprietor of a commercial establishment specializing in sporting and camping equipment, who aspired to pursue a career in painting. Through his contact with Kornblum, Maurice Rosy recognized that his contributions were not being adequately recognized at Dupuis. This led him to pursue a more ambitious professional trajectory. The two men resolved to collaborate, combining their respective talents and aspirations. Using Maurice Rosy's financial resources and the proceeds from Kornblum's business transaction, they leased an office in Brussels near the Spirou editorial office. Additionally, they procured an IBM typesetter, a scarce item for private individuals at the time, as well as a Rank Xerox camera, which they employed to enlarge, reduce, and reproduce the drawings they created. With this equipment, they then established their own company, which they named B.C.D.E. (Central Bureau of Distribution and Extension). Their objective was not merely to create comic books; they also sought to publish books and even develop a perfume. Concerning comics, Maurice Kornblum supplied storylines that Maurice Rosy would illustrate. The pair leased a spacious residence in Baisy-Thy, where they resided with their respective children (both men had recently undergone divorces). In 1969, the pair collaborated to write the script for the third story in the series, thereby formalizing their partnership with a contract. Their inaugural joint effort was an eight-page tale titled Attila's Christmas Eve, published in Spirou No. 1601 on December 19, 1968. The initial serialized narrative, Attila and the Mystery of Z14, was first published in Spirou on January 1, 1970, with issue number 1655. It continued until the publication of the subsequent issue, number 1675, on May 21, 1970. The date is May 21, 1970, as indicated by the number 1675. From this point onward, Derib, the illustrator, began to perceive a diminution in his role and influence within the creative process due to the emergence of a new collaborative dynamic between the two scriptwriters. On the one hand, Derib was barely involved in the writing process, communicating with the duo only by mail. On the other hand, he found that he was deriving less and less enjoyment from drawing the series, as Maurice Kornblum made it clear that he should strictly adhere to Maurice Rosy's storyboards. This new constraint stifled Derib's creativity. In 1971, the third story was published in album format.

In 1973, the fourth story, La Merveilleuse Surprise d'Odée, was published starting in Spirou no. 1816 on February 1, 1973, and ran until no. 1834 on June 7, 1973. By this time, Derib realized that he would not find his place within the new creative team. Additionally, the introduction of science fiction into the series made him lose interest in continuing the work, despite a fifth story having been fully storyboarded by Rosy and Kornblum. Derib even left Spirou after one of his story proposals was rejected by the editor, although great comic creators like André Franquin and Peyo had approved of it. Editor-in-chief Thierry Martens even told Derib that his comics no longer interested him. Charles Dupuis offered Rosy the chance to continue the series, but Rosy declined and took the opportunity to leave the comic book world altogether. At the same time, Rosy dissolved his partnership with Kornblum for financial reasons, as well as to regain a sense of freedom that he felt he had lost. The fourth story was published as an album in 1974.

=== The return of Attila ===
After the series ended, the rights were sold to Dupuis Editions, which decided to relaunch the series in 1987, using an unpublished script by Rosy and Kornblum. The artist Didgé (the son of Didier Chardez) was hired by Dupuis to illustrate this new story. However, neither of the original writers was informed of this revival, and Maurice Kornblum wasn't even credited as a co-writer. The story, Bak et Flak étonnent Attila, was published in Spirou from no. 2578 on September 8, 1987, to no. 2584 on October 20, 1987. This work, which had never been released in album form, was later published in a limited edition of three hundred copies by La Vache qui Médite in October 2010. The special edition featured ninety pages in color and black and white, including the forty-four completed panels and forty-five penciled panels by Maurice Rosy. In the same month and year, Dupuis reissued the four original Attila adventures in a complete anthology format.

== Analysis ==
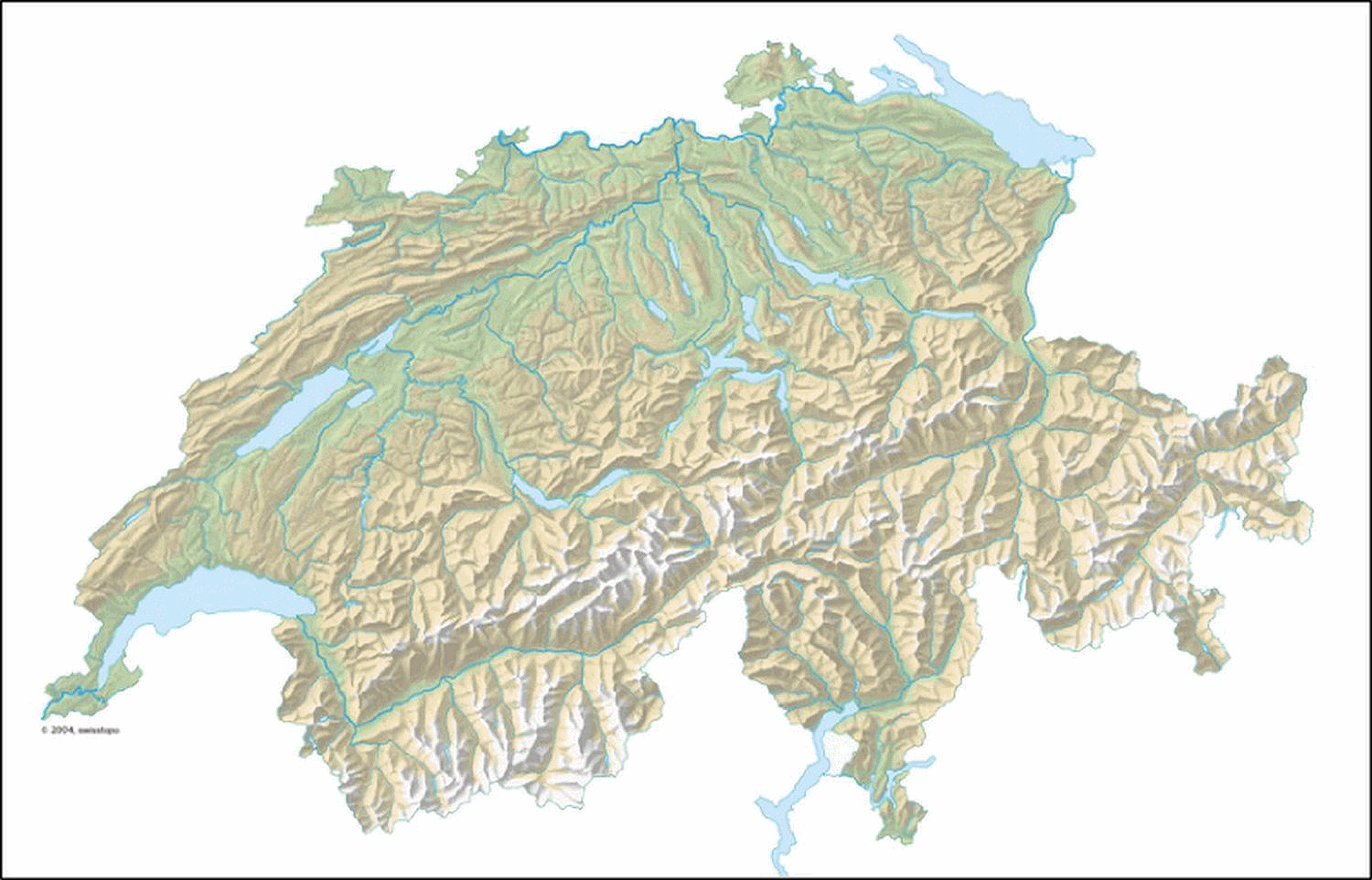
Map of Switzerland, the country where the series is set.

=== An unfinished work ===
For those with an affinity for comic books, Attila represents a series that, despite its merits, did not achieve the acclaim it deserved and could have become a seminal work in the field of sequential art. Despite the series' popularity among readers of Spirou magazine, the authors were approaching the conclusion of their creative cycle. Derib desired to illustrate his narratives, which were declined, including one Attila tale by Spirou's editor-in-chief at the time. Meanwhile, Maurice Rosy aspired to pursue a different path and depart from the realm of comics. Furthermore, the advent of a third figure, Maurice Kornblum, prompted a shift in the series' trajectory towards science fiction, a direction that Derib found disagreeable, as he favored a narrative centered on the comedic dichotomy of the character's dual identity as both a spy and a dog.

=== Graphic style ===
Upon commencing work on the series, Derib had recently concluded his tenure at Peyo's studio, where he had been responsible for inking The Smurfs. The initial album's graphic style was strikingly similar to that of the master, featuring prominent noses and ears, as caricature was a defining aspect of the Spirou style at the time. From the second album onwards, the style of the drawings diverged from that of Peyo yet remained closely aligned with the artistic conventions of the Marcinelle school. Nevertheless, this did not impede Derib's inclination to explore the backgrounds of his drawings in greater depth, a quality more closely aligned with the Brussels school, which was a prominent feature of Tintin magazine (a publication Derib would later join after concluding his Attila series). The color palette was developed by Studio Leonardo, which was responsible for all color work related to Spirou. Derib found this uniformity in the coloring to be a detriment, as it prevented the series from developing their distinctive spirit. Furthermore, the technique employed by the magazine, which involved testing tones based on printing, rendered it impossible to implement corrections in the event of an unsatisfactory print. To assist the fledgling artist, the scriptwriter Maurice Rosy provided him with a comprehensive storyboard of the narrative, which Derib was at liberty to modify by his creative vision. It was a storyboard that Charles Dupuis, the publisher, believed could be published without needing alteration.

=== Comedy ===
The comedy of the series is based on a contrast between the human-like behavior of the dog Attila and his actions as a canine. Attila is a spy for the Swiss army, yet he speaks and behaves like a human being. However, he also exhibits canine-like behavior when it comes to hiding his identity or making espionage easier. There is another form of comedy in the series, namely the running gag. This is exemplified by the character Ernest Bourrillon, Attila's master, who recounts an anecdote that begins with "This reminds me of the time when..." each time the situation becomes complicated, which causes Attila to become annoyed.

=== Criticism ===
The release of the complete anthology in 2010 permitted the presentation of many novel critical perspectives on the series. As stated on the website bdtresor.net, it is "a genuine delight." The website coinbd.com awarded the second album, Attila au château, a rating of three out of five. The rating was based on the following criteria: originality (three out of five), plot (three out of five), and drawing (three and a half out of five). The website Sceneario.com described the anthology as an "indispensable masterpiece" and commended the introductory dossier as "excellent", enabling readers to establish direct contact with the authors. Ultimately, this anthology is "essential for all enthusiasts of historical series from Spirou magazine." For Actuabd, "this reissue allows rediscovery of this relatively obscure series by Derib", and the presentation narrative provides "a fascinating insight into the magazine of good comedy."

== Publication ==
=== Magazine ===
The cover of Spirou no. 1531, dated August 17, 1967, introduced a new animal character, Attila, pursued by a soldier shouting, "Here, Attila! We're expected on page 4!" His adventure began with a serialized story titled Un métier de chien, continuing until no. 1551 on January 4, 1968. The four-legged spy returned in no. 1574 on June 13, 1968, for a new mission, Un métier de chien, which lasted until no. 1595 on November 7, 1968. For the Christmas Special theme, Spirou no. 1601 from December 19, 1968, offered a complete eight-page story Attila's Christmas Eve, co-written with Maurice Kornblum. In issue no. 1637 from August 28, 1969, an advertisement page announced the official release of Attila in a softcover album under the title Un métier de chien. On New Year's Day, the cover of issue no. 1655 from January 1, 1970, featured Le Mystère Z 14, an episode involving Maurice Kornblum, running until no. 1675 on May 21, 1970. Along with Kornblum, the creators left their mark in the Special 33rd Anniversary issue no. 1682 from July 9, 1970, with a two-page untitled complete story. Three years later, Attila made his final appearance on the cover of no. 1816 from February 1, 1973, presenting La Merveilleuse Surprise d'Odée, which ran until no. 1834 on June 7, 1973, in a vacation special. After fourteen years, the Swiss dog reappeared in no. 2578 from September 8, 1987, for a new serialized adventure titled Bak et Flak étonnent Attila, written by both Maurice Rosy and Kornblum and drawn by Didgé, lasting until no. 2584 on October 20, 1987.

Year	Title	Debut	Ending
1967	Un métier de chien	No. 1531	No. 1551
1968	Attila au château	No. 1574	No. 1595
1970	Le Réveillon d’Attila	No. 1601	
1970	Le Mystère Z 14	No. 1655	No. 1675
1970	(Untitled)	No. 1682	
1973	La Merveilleuse Surprise d'Odée	No. 1816	No. 1834
1987	Bak et Flak étonnent Attila	No. 2578	No. 2584

=== Albums ===
==== Publication history in albums ====
The inaugural volume of the series was first published in 1969 by Dupuis Editions. The initial publication was a paperback edition entitled Un métier de chien. The illustrations were created by Derib, while the script was penned by Maurice Rosy. The second album was released in the same year and was titled Attila au château. In 1971, the third album, bearing the title Le Mystère Z 14, was published. This album, like the subsequent one, was co-authored by Maurice Kornblum. The fourth and final original album published by Dupuis Editions was released in 1974 and titled La Merveilleuse Surprise d'Odée. In 1985, Dupuis Editions commenced the reissue of the series' albums in hardcover format. The reissue of the initial album was included in the Péchés de jeunesse collection, where it was the 23rd item. In the following year, the second album was reissued as the 24th volume in the collection. In 1987, the third and final album was reissued in hardcover, designated as number 25 in the Péchés de Jeunesse collection. The fifth and final album of the original collection was published in 2010 by La Vache qui Médite and is titled Bak et Flak étonnent Attila. The album was published in a limited edition of 300 copies and features the story drawn by Didgé and originally published in Spirou magazine in 1987, along with the storyboard created by Maurice Rosy ten years before Didgé's version. Subsequently, Dupuis Editions released a comprehensive anthology of the initial four albums, along with the two short stories published in Spirou, in the Patrimoine collection. The introduction to this anthology presented a detailed account of the series, authored by Christelle and Bertrand Pissavy-Yvernault.

==== Original collection ====
- Un métier de chien. Dupuis. 1969. (Storyboard: Maurice Rosy; Illustration: Derib)
- Attila au château. Dupuis. 1969. (Storyboard: Maurice Rosy; Illustration: Derib)
- Le Mystère Z 14. Dupuis. 1971. (Storyboard: Maurice Rosy and Maurice Kornblum; Illustration: Derib)
- La Merveilleuse Surprise d'Odée. Dupuis. 1974. (Storyboard: Maurice Rosy and Maurice Kornblum; Illustration: Derib)
- Bak et Flak étonnent Attila. La Vache qui médite. 2010. (Storyboard: Maurice Rosy and Maurice Kornblum; Illustration: Derib and Maurice Rosy)

==== Anthology ====
- Rosy, Maurice (2010). Attila – L'intégrale. Storyboarded by Maurice Rosy and Maurice Kornblum, and illustrated by Derib. Dupuis. ISBN 978-2-8001-4730-7.

==== Reissue ====
- Un métier de chien. Péchés de jeunesse. Storyboarded by Maurice Rosy, and illustrated by Derib. Dupuis. 1985. ISBN 2-8001-1169-0.
- Attila au château. Péchés de jeunesse. Storyboarded by Maurice Rosy, and illustrated by Derib. Dupuis. 1986. ISBN 2-8001-1245-X.
- Le Mystère Z 14. Péchés de jeunesse. Storyboarded by Maurice Rosy and Maurice Kornblum, and illustrated by Derib. Dupuis. 1987. ISBN 2-8001-1481-9.

=== International publication ===
De avonturen van Attila (in Dutch)

- Een hondebaan. Storyboarded by Maurice Rosy, and illustrated by Derib. Dupuis. 1969.
- Attila speelt tegen. Storyboarded by Maurice Rosy, and illustrated by Derib. Dupuis. 1969.
- De raadselachtige Z14. Storyboarded by Maurice Rosy and Maurice Kornblum, and illustrated by Derib. Dupuis. 1971.
- Vliegspul voor Z-14. Patrimoine. Storyboarded by Maurice Rosy and Maurice Kornblum, and illustrated by Derib. Dupuis. 1974.

Attila der Meisterdetektiv (in German)

- Kennwort Goldene Nase. Storyboarded by Maurice Rosy, and illustrated by Derib. Bastei. 1972.
- Unternehmen Schlossgespenst. Storyboarded by Maurice Rosy, and illustrated by Derib. Bastei. 1972.
- Das Geheimnis von Z14. Storyboarded by Maurice Rosy, and illustrated by Derib. Bastei. 1972.

== See also ==
- Derib
- Maurice Rosy
- Dupuis
- Spirou

== Bibliography ==
- Brun, Philippe (1981). Histoire de Spirou et des publications Dupuis (in French). Luçon: Glénat Éditions. ISBN 2-7234-0212-6.
- Collectif (1981). Schtroumpf - Les Cahiers de la bande dessinée (in French). Vol. 50: Derib. Glénat Éditions.
- Gaumer, Patrick (2001). "Attila". Dictionnaire mondial de la bande dessinée (in French). Paris: Larousse. ISBN 2-03-505 162-2.
- Béra, Michel; Denni, Michel; Mellot, Philippe (2008). Trésors de la bande dessinée : BDM (in French). Paris: Éditions de l'Amateur. ISBN 978-2-85917-491-0.
- Christelle; Pissavy-Yvernault, Bertrand (2010). Attila : L'intégrale (in French). Marcinelle: Dupuis. ISBN 978-2-8001-4730-7. (The unabridged version contains an introduction to the series)
- Maire, Frédéric (2016). Un chien dans le réduit alpin (in French). Vol. 2. Bédéphile. ISBN 9782882504357.
