= Maurice Rosy =

Belgian comics writer (1927–2013)

- Born: 17 November 1927 Fontaine-l'Évêque, Belgium
- Died: 23 February 2013 (aged 85)
- Area: writer
- Notable works: Tif et Tondu; Bobo

Maurice Rosy (17 November 1927 – 23 February 2013), was a Belgian comics writer who also worked as artistic director of Spirou magazine during its golden period.

== Biography ==
Rosy was born in Fontaine-l'Évêque. He was employed by Charles Dupuis in 1954 as "giver of ideas" at the Franco-Belgian comics magazine Spirou. Two years later he assumed the position of artistic director, which he remained until 1971. Along with Yvan Delporte, he is credited with responsibility of the magazine's success during the 1950s and 1960s.

In the early 1950s he wrote scenarios for André Franquin's series Spirou et Fantasio, and Jijé's Jerry Spring, before he took over the writing of Tif et Tondu from Luc Bermar, collaborating with Will over a period of thirteen years. As Spirou took to publishing the mini–récit (mini story booklets) Rosy had a hand in the creation of new series that began in this format, and in 1959 Rosy worked with Jean Roba to create the series Boule et Bill. In 1961 he collaborated with Paul Deliège to create Bobo. After working on Bobo for several years, even as artist on occasions, he created the series Attila in 1967, illustrated by Derib.

== Bibliography ==
Series	Years	Albums	Artist	Editor	Remarks
Spirou et Fantasio	1953–1956	2	Franquin	Dupuis	Le dictateur et le champignon, Les pirates du silence
Tif et Tondu	1955–1969	12	Will	Dupuis	Created Monsieur Choc (Mister Shock), a popular villain
Boule et Bill	1959–1960	2	Jean Roba	Dupuis	
Bobo	1961–1972	7	Paul Deliège	Dupuis	artwork also by Rosy during periods of the strip's run.
Attila	1969–1974	4	Derib	Dupuis	
