= Marcinelle school =

Art style

Typical vivid movement of Spirou and Marsupilami from André Franquin's comic Spirou et Fantasio

The terms "Marcinelle school" (French: École de Marcinelle) and "Charleroi school" (École de Charleroi) refer to a group of Belgian cartoonists formed by Joseph Gillain (known as Jijé) following World War II. The first generation, known as the "Bande à quatre" ("Gang of four"), consisted of Jijé and his assistants Franquin, Morris and Will. Marcinelle school cartoonists were all associated with the weekly magazine, Spirou, whose offices in the 1940s were located in the town of Marcinelle, near Charleroi in Belgium.

The style of these cartoonists soon became the preferred in-house style for artists working at the influential Spirou magazine, and thus had a huge impact on the Belgian comics and Franco-Belgian comics scene, inspiring generations of cartoonists.

== Style ==
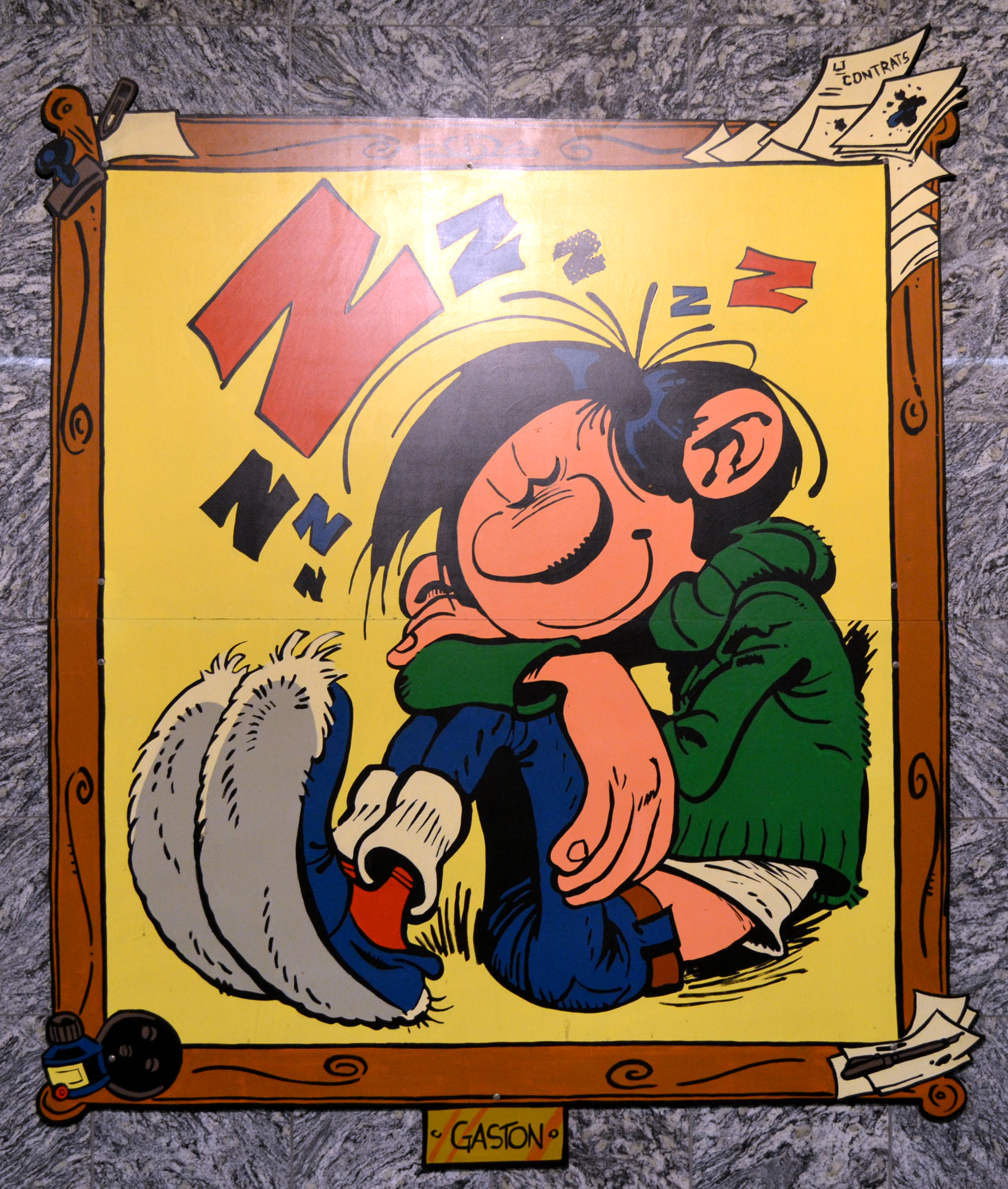
Gaston Lagaffe: even when characters are asleep, there is an impression of movement

Stylistically, the Marcinelle school is a mix of cartoonish and realist, and is also sometimes called comic-dynamic ("comic" here refers to "comical", not the medium). It is often cited in books in opposition to Hergé's ligne claire style. Though these two styles have much in common, Marcinelle school is all about conveying the impression of movement, while ligne claire tends to be more schematic.

== List of artists ==
The artists most closely associated to the Marcinelle school are, Joseph Gillain (Jijé), André Franquin, Maurice de Bevere (Morris), Willy Maltaite (Will), Eddy Paape, Pierre Culliford (Peyo), Jean Roba and Victor Hubinon.

École de Marcinelle
| Illustrator | Work |
|---|---|
Precursors
| Robert Velter | Spirou |
| Fernand Dineur | Tif et Tondu |
Initiator
| Jijé | Spirou & Fantasio, Blondin et Cirage |
1st Generation (40s)
| André Franquin | Spirou & Fantasio, Gaston, Marsupilami, Modeste et Pompon, Franquin's Last Laugh |
| Morris | Lucky Luke, Rantanplan |
| Will | Tif et Tondu, Isabelle |
2nd Generation (50s)
| Jidéhem | Spirou & Fantasio, Gaston, Sophie |
| Peyo | The Smurfs, Johan and Peewit, Benoît Brisefer, Poussy |
| Jean Roba | Boule et Bill, La Ribambelle |
| Maurice Tillieux | Gil Jourdan |
| Albert Uderzo | Asterix, Oumpah-pah |
| Remacle | Le Vieux Nick et Barbe-Noire |
3rd Generation (60s)
| Paul Deliège | Bobo |
| Derib | Yakari, Les Aventures d'Attila |
| Jacques Devos | Génial Olivier |
| Dupa | Cubitus |
| Jean-Claude Fournier | Spirou & Fantasio |
| Gos | Scrameustache, Natacha |
| Greg | Achille Talon |
| Lambil | Les Tuniques Bleues, Pauvre Lampil |
| Vittorio Leonardo | Rantanplan |
| Raymond Macherot | Sibylline, Chlorophylle, Clifton |
| Louis Salvérius | Les Tuniques Bleues |
| Pierre Seron | Les Petits Hommes |
| Turk | Léonard |
| François Walthéry | Natacha |
| Berck | Sammy |
