= Vittorio Leonardo =

Italian colorist

Vittorio Leonardo (25 November 1938) is an Italian colorist of some famous Franco-Belgian comics series. He worked for Spirou magazine and founded the Studio Leonardo, which continued his work.

== Biography ==
Vittorio Leonardo was born in Naples, Italy, in 1938. He left his motherland for Belgium in 1947. After various graphic experiences (charcoal, models, oil paintings), he finally dedicated himself to the comic strip. He met Morris and kept in touch with him.

With the help of Morris, but also Franquin, Peyo and Remacle, Leonardo created the comics series Barbotine which allowed him to be hired by Spirou magazine. He took over Hultrasson in 1973, and he created Superdog and Bardolino. He also wrote some scenarios, among them Boule et Bill. Hired by Morris' Lucky Productions, he is entrusting the drawing of some Rantanplan albums, published each week in Télé Star from 1993. He specially contributed to the albums Bêtisier 3, Bêtisier 5, Les Cerveaux, Bêtisier 4, and Le Grand Voyage, written by Bob de Groot.

=== Studio Leonardo ===
Studio Leonardo colors a large part of the comics series published in Spirou. They use computer systems developed by Leonardo and his son, Jourdan. Their colleagues Studio Cerise, also working for Spirou, mainly color manually.

== Bibliography as colorist ==
- Steven Strong (1 album)
- Boule et Bill (4 albums)
- Gaston (5 albums)
- Isabelle (4 album)
- Lucky Luke (22 albums)
- Marsupilami (4 albums)
- Natacha (4 albums)
- La Patrouille des Castors
- Rantanplan (17)
- The Smurfs (3 albums)
- Spirou et Fantasio
- Yoko Tsuno (22 albums)
