= Benoît Brisefer =

Belgian comic series

- Cover of the first album
- Author: Peyo
- Illustrator(s): Peyo, Will, François Walthéry, Marc Wasterlain, Albert Blesteau, Pascal Garray
- Current status/schedule: Discontinued
- Launch date: 1960
- End date: 2014
- Publisher(s): Dupuis, Le Lombard
- Genre: Adventure comics

Benoît Brisefer (French for "Benedict Ironbreaker", published as "Benny Breakiron" in English, Dutch: Steven Sterk) is a Belgian comic strip created in 1960 by Peyo (best known for the Smurfs) and published by Dupuis and later Le Lombard, about a little boy whose peaceful, innocent appearance, charm and good manners covers his possession of superhuman strength. Since Peyo's death it has been continued by other artists and writers. Parts of the series have been published in a number of languages around the world.

== Publication history ==
Benoît Brisefer first appeared in issue 1183 of Spirou magazine in mid-December 1960. His adventures were regularly published in both the magazine and in book form. As well as Peyo himself, other contributors to the series included leading figures in the Belgian comics industry, such as Will, Jean Roba (who drew some of the covers when the series was published in Spirou), Gos, Yvan Delporte, François Walthéry and Albert Blesteau, many of whom were part of Peyo's studio.

It initially lasted till 1978 when the success of the Smurfs prevented Peyo from working on his other series. Since his death in 1992, it has been restarted by his son Thierry Culliford and artist Pascal Garray. Peyo's signature still appears on the pages drawn by Garray.

In 1967, the British comic Giggle published Benoît's first adventure, giving him the name Tammy Tuff. Other English-language publications have used the name Steven Strong and Benny Breakiron.

== Main character ==
Benoît Brisefer, the main character of the series

Benoît Brisefer is a blond-haired little boy who always wears a beret, a blue scarf, a red jacket and black shorts. He is polite, honest and well-mannered, pays attention at school (he often quotes his teacher's life advice) and likes to help people in need. He hates crime and injustice and has an intense dislike of firearms.

What makes him exceptional, though, are his physical abilities, which are vastly enhanced versions of normal human abilities (he has no supernatural abilities such as flight or projecting energy): vast superhuman strength (in Les Douze Travaux de Benoît Brisefer, he proved capable of effortlessly lifting an elephant or tearing a large safe door), incredible leaping and great speed. He occasionally demonstrated other abilities such as super-breath not unlike Superman's (in Les Douze Travaux de Benoît Brisefer, he used it once to extinguish a fire). He also seems to possess some degree of invulnerability (in Les Douze Travaux de Benoît Brisefer again, he fell from a flying plane and landed roughly on the ground by punching a hole in it, but he was unharmed). However, his weakness is the cold; if he catches it, he loses his strength and becomes merely a "well-behaved little boy that every parent would love to have."

Benoît lives in the small town of Vivejoie-la-Grande (French for "Big-Lovejoy"). No mention is ever made of him having parents or guardians of any kind. The only such reference was in Le Cirque Bodoni where Choesels, wanting to attract publicity and interest, told the journalists that Benoît belonged in a family of a Turk father and a Gypsy mother, one of 10 children. His last Peyo-written adventure, Le Fétiche, showed that a lady called Madam Minou took care of his house and served him his breakfast, but lives in another part of town. Other than that, his only known relative is his uncle Tonton Placide whom he sometimes stays with during the holidays.

A running gag in the strip is that Benoît's adult acquaintances are completely ignorant of his abilities: they are always absent or incapacitated when Benoît uses his strength, which he generally keeps secret. Whenever he tries to confide his secret with them, their response is bemused disbelief and "Of course, Benoît, of course." The few times he tries to demonstrate his strength, he catches a cold. The witnesses of his power are the villains, always after they have been warned and failed to believe him. They usually all end up lying in a heap, knocked unconscious by Benoît.

A recurring joke is Benoît's inability to narrate and explain events clearly when in haste or excited, as whenever he tries to warn the police. He talks excessively mixing his words, names and events, and ends up befuddling and confusing the adults. As a result, he is never taken seriously, even if later he is proven right.

Another recurring joke is how Benoît, in his childhood innocence, links his larger-than-life experiences to basic morals taught in school. For example, after uprooting a tree to save a stranded cat, he returns it to its previous position because "The schoolmistress says so". When attacked by criminals he tries to conform them by saying "The schoolmistress always says that you should not attack people who are smaller than yourself". The frequently-mentioned schoolmistress is not seen until Le Fétiche where her name is revealed to be "Mlle Tapotrin".

A frequent gag is Benoît's inability to control his strength, perceived by others as clumsiness. After each blunder, Benoît says to himself "What have I done again?". This makes it difficult for Benoît to play with other kids as he unintentionally breaks their toys: simply kicking a ball would cause it to burst. In later stories he is less clumsy, making friends and he and other children enjoy a good time at summer camp.

== Supporting characters ==
Mrs Adolphine, her robot double, Benoît Brisefer and Serge Vladlavodka

Jules Dussiflard: a former jazz musician, now the driver of an old inter-war taxi.

Serge Vladlavodka: an inventor who has devised a number of mechanical creations, including robots. Among other things, Vladlavodka was the creator of Madame Adolphine II.

Madame Adolphine: a charming little old lady, who is quite harmless and always offering sweets to passing acquaintances. She was the model for the robotic Madame Adolphine II.

Madame Adolphine II aka Lady d'Olphine: a robot created by Vladlavodka. He based her design on the (real-life) concept of the turtle robots devised by William Grey Walter but also made her more sentient. He also built her to look like a local lady, Mrs Adolphine, since the thick clothes she wore would cover the mechanics and the appearance of an old woman would explain her slowness. However, Vladlavodka once got two of her circuits mixed up and as a result she became evil: holding up people at gunpoint, robbing banks and even becoming a crime lord under the name "Lady d'Olphine". Although not strong enough to battle Benoît, she is cunning and manipulative and has often tricked the good-natured little boy into unintentionally helping her in her plans.

The chief of police: of the town where Benoît lives. Benoît often goes to see him to warn of the crimes that he has witnessed, but his tendency to talk excessively when excited and mixing up his words tries the chief's patience and he sends him packing — leaving Benoît to deal with the crooks himself. The chief also dismisses his claims on the grounds that kids like him read too many comics — before going into his office and reading some comics himself.

Uncle Placid: the nearest Benoît appears to have to a relative, Uncle Placid is a large, powerfully-built man with a big heart to go with it. He is a police bodyguard who protects visiting foreign officials and celebrities. He is an expert marksman and can more than hold his own in a fight against multiple opponents (though he lacks his nephew's superhuman strength — of which he is unaware of in spite of Benoît's numerous attempts to show him).

== Media adaptations ==
Benoît Brisefer film poster

In 2014 the comic strip was adapted into a live-action film, Benoît Brisefer: Les Taxis rouges (fr). The movie, named after the first album of the same name from the series, stars Jean Reno, Gérard Jugnot and Thierry Lhermitte. The translated English version is named Benedict Ironbreaker: The Red Taxis.

== In popular culture ==
In the Hoogstraat/Rue Haute in Brussels a comic book wall is dedicated to the character. The fresco was designed by the artistic ensemble Urbana.

== Stories ==
Below is a list of the French titles of Benoît Brisefer's adventures, their year of publication, an English translation of the titles and a brief description. They are listed in order of publication.

French Title	Date of Publication	English Translation	Writer	Artist
Les Taxis rouges	1960	[The Red Taxis]	Peyo	Peyo, Will
A new taxi service has moved into the town of Vivejoie-la-Grande. Their more modern cars provide tough competition to Benoît's friend Mister Dussiflard and his old pre-war banger. But then they discover that the Red Taxi company is actually a cover for a much more dubious enterprise.
Madame Adolphine	1963	[Madame Adolphine]	Peyo	Peyo, Will
Benoît meets a nice little old lady called Mrs Adolphine and even plays with her for a while. But when he encounters her a couple of days later she denies ever meeting him. Intrigued by this, Benoît tracks her down to the home of Serge Vladlavodka whom she has knocked out with a hammer! Upon recovering, Vladlavodka reveals that there are two Mrs Adophines: one a normal human, the other a robot who has become evil and committed robberies. To cap it all, the police have arrested the former in mistake for the latter.
Les Douze travaux de Benoît Brisefer	1966	[The Twelve Trials of Benoît Brisefer]	Yvan Delporte	Peyo
Mister Dussiflard was once part of a jazz band. Circumstances led a young Arab prince to give the band the title deeds to some land. The musicians cut up the title deed, and each received a piece of the document. Now oil has been discovered on the land, and it is necessary to get all the pieces of paper together in order to claim it. Mister Dussiflard and Benoît thus set off to find the other members of the band, who have gone their separate ways all around the world. To make things even more complicated, one of them apparently wants the pieces and the land all for himself.
Tonton Placide	1968	[Uncle Placid]	Peyo, Gos	Peyo, François Walthéry
Benoît spends the school holidays with his Uncle Placide, a state-employed bodyguard. Placide is suddenly assigned to escort Mister Chnik, the Finance Minister of Furengrootsbadenschtein, who has come to obtain documents relating to the printing of money. But what should be a safe and easy mission turns sour when well-organised gangsters get involved and it will take the combined efforts of uncle and nephew to get the irritable minister safely to destination. Note: This album features a cameo by the character Aimé De Mesmaeker from the Gaston comic series.
Le Cirque Bodoni	1969	[The Bodoni Circus]	Peyo, Gos	François Walthéry
Benoît is excited when the family-run Bodoni Circus arrives in town, but the acts they put on are rather disappointing and it looks like they are going to go bust. Benoît offers his services, and by showing off his strength and other abilities he soon turns the circus' fortunes. But they also attract the attention of competitors who want him for their own pofit and will not take "no" for an answer.
Lady d'Olphine	1972	[Lady d'Olphine]	Peyo, Yvan Delporte	François Walthéry
Benoît learns that the robotic Mrs Adolphine has been re-activated and become a major figure in organised crime in the principality of Monte San Sone. With Mister Vladlavodka and his bungling cousin Melchior, Benoît sets off to bring her down but is it possible that she has in fact reformed? Note: This story raises the issue of organised crime, wars between such gangs and the corruption of police and politicians.
Pas de joie pour Noël	1976	[No Joy for Christmas]	Yvan Delporte	Peyo, Albert Blesteau
Le Fétiche	1978	[The Fetish]	Peyo, Albert Blesteau	Albert Blesteau
A trio of criminals try to persuade Benoît to obtain, by force, a fetish from a museum. Honest Benoît of course refuses and the crooks have to resort to increasingly desperate measures in order to get him under their control.
Hold-up sur pellicule	1993	[Hold-up on Film]	Thierry Culliford, Dugomier	Pascal Garray
When the story of Mrs Adolphine and her robot double becomes public, a film producer is quick to set about making a movie based on the events. The announcement that certain scenes are going to be filmed in an actual bank raises the interest of some robbers, and who best to lead them but the robotic Lady d'Olphine?
L'île de la désunion	1995	[The Island of Disunion]	Thierry Culliford, Pascal Garray	Pascal Garray
When his friend Mister Vladlavodka mysteriously disappears, Benoît suspects that it has something to do with the various gadgets that he has created for a James Bond-like movie and the trail leads him to an island where three tin-pot dictators are engaged in a never-ending struggle for power.
La Route du sud	1997	[The Southern Road]	Thierry Culliford, Pascal Garray	Pascal Garray
Auto mechanic Victor Martin has acquired a racing car in which he intends to participate in the rally competition known as the Southern Road. Mister Dussiflard will provide support in his taxi and agrees to take Benoît with him. It's not long before the three friends discover that some of the competitors are resorting to dubious means to cut down on the competition — and yet winning the event is the least of their worries.
Le Secret d'Églantine	1999	[The Secret of Eglantine]	Thierry Culliford, Pascal Garray	Pascal Garray
Benoît meets a little girl called Eglantine and discovers that she has superhuman strength similar to his own. However, she is desperate to keep it a secret since the circumstances in which she acquired it could lead to trouble with her parents. But trouble is also never far away when they both end up at the same summer camp.
Chocolats et coups fourrés	2002	[Chocolates and Underhand Tricks]	Thierry Culliford, Pascal Garray	Pascal Garray
Benoît meets a balloonist who is about to take off for a flight. Suddenly, a young man appears and forces the balloon to take off, along with himself and Benoît. The young man explains that he has discovered a major drug-smuggling operation and is pursued by two of the dealers. But when you have a balloon set on a random course, evading the crooks is a case of easier said than done.
John-John	2004	[John-John]	Thierry Culliford, Frédéric Jannin	Pascal Garray
During the winter holidays, Uncle Placide takes Benoît to the mountains to watch over John-John, the young son of a famous movie star. The two boys get on well, but their holiday is marred by the constant harassment of photographers and a plot to destroy a local village. Note: This story raises the issue of the paparazzi and the stalking of celebrities. Uncle Placide's description of the death of John-John's mother is similar to that of Princess Diana.
Sur Les Traces du Gorille Blanc	2015	[In the Footsteps of the White Gorilla]	Thierry Culliford, Frédéric Jannin	Pascal Garray
The spectacular encounter between the strongest little boy and the most mythical creature of the African jungles.

== See also ==
- The Mort & Phil comic El plano de Alí-Gusa-No, which shares a similar plot with Les Douze travaux de Benoît Brisefer.
- Marcinelle school
