= Jeannette Pointu =

Belgian comic strip (1982–2005)

- Main character with the series logo

Publication information
- Publisher: Dupuis, Mosquito, Arcadia
- Genre: Adventure comics
- Publication date: 1982
- No. of issues: 20

Creative team
- Written by: Marc Wasterlain
- Artist(s): Marc Wasterlain

Jeannette Pointu is a Belgian comic book series created by Marc Wasterlain, starring the eponymous character. The series appeared in the comic magazine Spirou from 1982 to 2005.

== Synopsis ==
Jeannette is curious and stubborn. Two qualities that serve her well in her job, as she is a photographer and follows the discovery of ancient treasures and scientific developments for her newspaper.

An adventurer who remains feminine in all situations, Jeannette seeks to denounce injustice and misery around the world. She often gets into places where she shouldn't, which gets her into trouble and leads to one twist after another.

== Publication history ==
All albums were written and drawn by Marc Wasterlain. Dupuis published the first twenty albums in French and the first nineteen in Dutch, under the name Sarah Spits.

After that, Mosquito continued the series in French, while Arcadia issued the next two collating albums in Dutch. So far, there were no English translations.

== Comic books ==
1. Le Fils de l'Inca, ISBN 2-8001-1133-X
2. Quatre x quatre, ISBN 2-8001-1411-8
3. Le Dragon vert, ISBN 2-8001-1482-7
4. Yeren, ISBN 2-8001-1557-2
5. Reportages, ISBN 2-8001-1598-X
6. Le Secret atlante, ISBN 2-8001-1932-2
7. Mission sur Mars, ISBN 2-8001-2037-1
8. Le Tigre de Tasmanie, ISBN 2-8001-2103-3
9. Les Femmes girafes, ISBN 2-8001-2180-7
10. Casque bleu, ISBN 2-8001-2210-2
11. Le Monstre, ISBN 2-8001-2257-9
12. Les Fourmis géantes, ISBN 2-8001-2425-3
13. Le Trésor des calanques, ISBN 2-8001-2578-0
14. Le Grand Panda, ISBN 2-8001-2789-9
15. Aventure virtuelle, ISBN 2-8001-2939-5
16. Les Hommes-feuilles, ISBN 2-8001-3091-1
17. Opération clonage, ISBN 2-8001-3223-X
18. 2003 : Femmes massaïs, ISBN 2-8001-3347-3
  1. Ngorongoro (Tanzania)
  2. Burka (Afghanistan)
  3. Indi (India)
  4. Road Train (Australia)
  5. Nying-Ba (Nepal)
  6. La pédégère (une grande ville)
19. 2004 : Les Amazones, ISBN 2-8001-3478-X
  1. Les Amazones (Amazonie)
  2. La pirate (mer de Chine)
  3. Chien jaune (porte-avions Charles de Gaulle)
  4. La petite fugueuse (une banlieue)
  5. Femmes peules (Niger)
20. 2005 : Chasseurs de Tornades, ISBN 2-8001-3643-X
  1. Chasseurs de tornades (États-Unis)
  2. Bois d'ébène
  3. La Reine des sables
  4. Tambalacoque
  5. La Mer perdue (mer d'Aral)
  6. Erébus (Antarctique)

== See also ==
• Belgian comics • Franco-Belgian comics • Marcinelle school
