= Pascal Garray =

Belgian comics cartoonist and scriptwriter

- Born: Pascal Garray; 12 December 1965 Rocourt, Belgium
- Died: 17 January 2017 (aged 51) Liège, Belgium
- Areas: Cartoonist, Writer, Artist
- Notable works: The Smurfs, Benoît Brisefer

Pascal Garray (12 December 1965 – 17 January 2017) was a Belgian comics artist and cartoonist best known for his work on Peyo's The Smurfs and Benoît Brisefer (known in Dutch as Steven Sterk).

== Biography ==
Pascal Garray studied art at the Institut Saint-Luc in Liège. Following his studies, he joined the staff of Studio Peyo as a comics artist in 1990. During his first two years at the studio, Garray was taught to draw characters from The Smurfs and Benoît Brisefer by Peyo himself.

Garray helped continue both The Smurfs and Benoît Brisefer comics following Peyo's death in 1992. He and Peyo's son, Thierry Culliford, resumed work on Benoît Brisefer after the artist's death, with Garray, who was 28 years old at the time of its relaunch, heading the project as its principal artist. Despite his work in Benoît Brisefer, Garray became best known for his contributions to The Smurfs as one of the comic series' most important artists. Since 1990, Garray contributed as an artist and writer on seventeen comic books for The Smurfs and seven editions of Benoît Brisefer.

Pascal Garray died in Liège, Belgium, on 17 January 2017, at the age of 51. Prior to his death, Garray had completed work on his last comic for The Smurfs, "The Smurfs and the Purple Bean" (French: Les Schtroumpfs et les haricots Mauves, Dutch: De Smurfen en de paarse bonen), which was released in September 2017.

== See also ==
• Marcinelle school
