= Will (comics) =

Belgian comics artist (1927–2000)

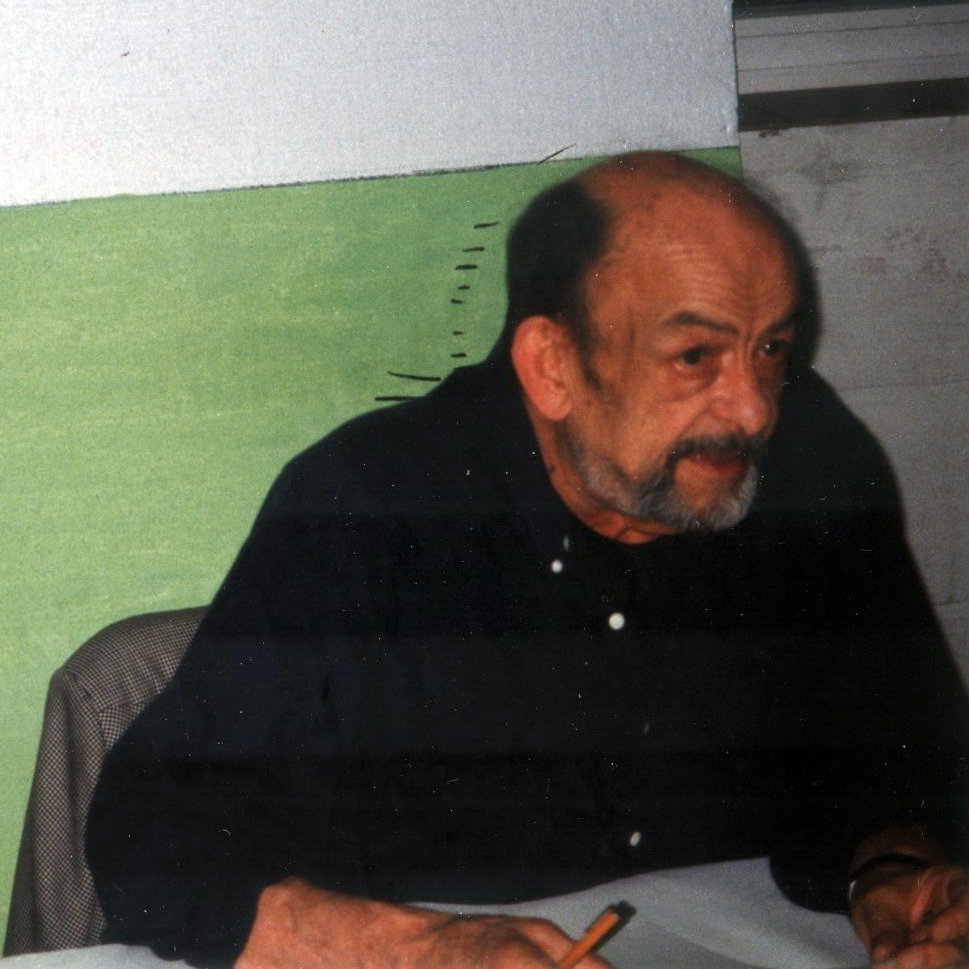
- Willy Maltaite, 1996
- Born: Willy Maltaite; 30 October 1927 Anthée, Belgium
- Died: 18 February 2000 (aged 72)
- Areas: Artist, colourist, writer
- Notable works: Tif et Tondu; Isabelle; Le jardin des désirs

Willy Maltaite (French: [vili maltɛt]; 30 October 1927 – 18 February 2000), better known by the pseudonym Will ([vil]), was a Belgian comics creator and comics artist in the Franco-Belgian tradition. In the genre known in Francophone countries as bande dessinée, Will is one of the young cartoonists trained by Jijé, who made them live and work with him in his studio in Waterloo. He is considered one of la Bande des Quatre (the Gang of 4, which also included André Franquin, Morris, and Jijé himself), and a founding member of the Marcinelle school.

== Work ==
Over a long association with the Franco-Belgian comics magazine Le journal de Spirou (Spirou magazine) starting in 1947, Will created, illustrated and wrote several series, including Tif et Tondu (as main artist, taking over from creator Fernand Dineur), and Isabelle. He wrote scripts for, among others, Spirou et Fantasio and Benoît Brisefer. During the period of 1958–60, Will also acted as artistic director of Spirou's rival publication Tintin magazine.

== Awards ==
- 2008: Hommage to Comics Award at the Festival of Solliès-Ville

== Partial bibliography ==
- Tif et Tondu, 39 albums with various collaborators, Dupuis.
- Isabelle, 12 albums with Yvan Delporte, André Franquin and Raymond Macherot (story), Dupuis, 1972-1995.
- L'Île d'outre-monde, Natacha n°10 (art), with François Walthéry (art) and Marc Wasterlain (story), Dupuis, 1980.
- Contribution to collective Il était une fois les belges (Once Upon a Time There Were the Belgians), Le Lombard, 1980.
- L'ogresse des carpartes, with Yann (story), in Les Histoires merveilleuses des oncles Paul, Vents d'Ouest, 1986.
- Le jardin des désirs (The Garden of Desires), with Stephen Desberg (story), Dupuis, coll. " Aire Libre ", 1988.
- La 27e lettre (The 27th Letter), with Stephen Desberg (story), Dupuis, coll. " Aire Libre ", 1990.
- L'appel de l'enfer (Appeal in Hell), with Stephen Desberg, P&T Productions, 1993.
- Isabelle in the collective Brel n°2, Vents d'Ouests, 1997.
- L'arbre des deux printemps (The Tree of the Two Springs), with Rudi Miel (story), Le Lombard, collective "Signé", 2000. Will could not finish the last 4 pages prior to his death.

== Sources ==
- Will publications in Le journal de Spirou, French Tintin and Belgian Tintin BDoubliées
- Will albums Bedetheque (in French)
