= Génial Olivier =

Belgian comic series written and drawn by Jacques Devos

- Main character Olivier Delabranche
- Author: Jacques Devos
- Illustrator: Jacques Devos
- Current status/schedule: Discontinued
- Launch date: 1963
- End date: 1988
- Syndicate(s): Dupuis
- Genre: Humor comics
- Original language: fr

Génial Olivier (Brilliant Olivier) is a humorous Belgian comic series about a child prodigy. Written and drawn by Jacques Devos, it first appeared in Spirou magazine in 1963 and lasted a quarter of a century, ending with Devos' retirement in 1988.

The series consisted mainly of one-page gags and short stories which covered several pages. There were few full-length adventures. The strip was also notable for the puns and jokes in the text.

== Premise ==
Olivier Delabranche (i.e. Olive Branch) is a scientific genius well ahead of his time and his own age. Super-computers, various types of transport, robots, lifelike holograms, even the elixir of youth, he has invented the lot and more. Be it chemistry or technology, science holds few secrets from him. He qualifies for a dozen Nobel Prizes in those subjects and he is not yet a teenager !

Olivier is in fact a little boy of about 10. Unfortunately, the efforts of this child prodigy go largely unappreciated by the adult world, including parents and teachers. Whereas he should perhaps be in an advanced school where his talents would be developed (as if they needed to be) or even a top university, Olivier is in fact still stuck in a normal, everyday primary school.

The reason for this is that, science apart, in all other respects he is a dunce. In history, geography, spelling and grammar, Olivier is at the bottom of the class and the despair of his teacher, Mister Rectitude.

== The Pupil and the Teacher ==
"Brilliant" Olivier at work in his laboratory

Most of the stories revolve around the relationship between the little genius and his more down-to-earth teacher, with whom he is engaged in a never-ending war of nerves (nerves being the operative word when it comes to the teacher). While Mister Rectitude tries desperately to maintain discipline, Olivier comes up with all kinds of inventions which cause chaos all over the school.

(As if to emphasize the conflict between teacher and pupil, the series was renamed M. Rectitude et Génial Olivier when published in book form.)

Olivier's greatest pleasure is to take an invention to school which he will use either to play pranks on Mister Rectitude and/or other pupils or members of staff, or come up with ways to cheat in the exams. This, plus his inattention in class or his tendency to chat with his friend Flafla, results in lines and after-school detentions. During these punishments, Olivier tries out some other invention which causes further agro for the teacher and his colleagues. This results in more detentions, more inventions and so on and so on...

In the latter years of the series, Olivier became more and more malevolent and his inventions tended to be destined solely to drive the education establishment (and Mister Rectitude in particular) besides themselves with exasperation.

Although not entirely a mad scientist himself, Olivier certainly knows how to drive other people crazy. But, as if perhaps trying to give the teaching profession its due, Devos did allow the ever-frustrated Mr Rectitude to get the last word on many occasions.

== Characters ==
Olivier Delabranche is a child prodigy and a brilliant inventor. His creations have included anti-gravity devices, fully-grown clones, time machines and even a faster-than-light spaceship. However, like most small boys, there is a mischievous side to his personality. A lot of his inventions are built in order to play jokes on other kids and grown-ups and he has, on occasion, turned the whole school into a testing ground. However, when it comes to other subjects, he is a complete dunce. This and his lack of attention in class results in a never-ending series of punishments, like lines to write and after-school detentions, which he tries to liven up by having fun with his latest gimmick, which, after a good laugh, is followed by yet more punishment.

Mister Arsène Rectitude is Olivier's primary school teacher. Like most of the adults, he does not fully appreciate his pupil's genius or the inventions he comes up with, especially when they are employed in upsetting his nerves, which they usually do. The result is Mister Rectitude dishing out one punishment and detention after another on the young prodigy, who employs more inventions in order to get back at him. Mister Rectitude often confers with his conscience over what is going on or the best way to deal with it.

Flafla is Olivier's best friend and sits next to him in class. He sometimes calls on his pal's ingenuity to help out with girls and bullies. Flafla's attitude to Olivier's inventions tends to vary. He enjoys the humour and confusion that results from their use, but at other times predicts nothing but disaster. His predictions have a tendency to turn out right with Flafla sharing in the resulting punishments. Flafla has an eye for the ladies and Olivier sometimes blackmails him into helping test his inventions or else he'll tell Flafla's concurrent girlfriends about each other.
Absalon Biscoton is the muscle-bound school bully. He prefers flexing his brawn rather than his brain. An aggressive so-and-so, he will beat up the other pupils on just a whim and the brain-box Olivier in particular. Many of Olivier's inventions are therefore aimed at him. He wears a pink shirt and colourful, stripped trousers. He is the son of the P.E. teacher (originally a policeman) from whom he quite likely gets his thickness in muscles and intelligence.
Berthe is Olivier's girlfriend and as such can get jealous and possessive especially when he is looked at by the admiring eyes of other girls. She often calls on him to help make a new outfit or hairstyle or something else to improve her appearance. Needless to say, things don't always go according to plan and, instead of a grateful kiss, Olivier ends up with a slap from Berthe's hand or handbag.

The headmaster and senior master can do little but look on at the tricks and chaos unleashed by Olivier and the resultant damage to their school, not to mention the fall in morale amongst their staff. This can get even more edgier when the inspector from the Education Ministry turns up for an unannounced visit.

Alphonse, the school janitor, is a simple-minded man. It can take him a while to realise what is going on or who is responsible for the strange events that result from Olivier's inventions. This makes him an ideal target. It also befalls on him to clean up the resultant mess. A former lancer, he is married to another cleaner, Léocadie.

Philémon Delabranche is Olivier's father. He sometimes takes advantage of his son's inventions, even though they do not always give the results desired or have unexpected consequences. It was his brother, Uncle Alfred, who gave Olivier his first home chemistry set and although there are few details of what happened afterwards, Alfred was forced to share in the resulting cost and Philémon would not talk to him for six months ! (Although some of the early strips refer to Olivier having a mother, she does not feature in them and the latter ones appear to indicate that Mr Delabranche is a single parent.)

== Titles ==
Olivier's adventures have not been published in English. Below is a list of the French book titles and their year of publication. Most of them are collections of one-page gags and short stories. Almost all the stories were written and drawn by Jacques Devos, with one being credited to Frédéric Jannin.

When the stories appeared in Spirou they were titled Génial Olivier, but the name was changed to M. Rectitude et Génial Olivier when published in book form.

1. L'école en folie 1974
2. Le génie et sa génération 1975
3. Génie, Vidi, Vici 1976
4. Un généreux génie gêné 1977
5. Le génie se surpasse 1984
6. Un ingénieux ingénieur génial 1978
7. Le passé recomposé 1979
8. Electrons, molécules et pensums 1980
9. L'électron et le blason 1981
10. Un génie ingénu 1982
11. Génie, péripéties et facéties 1983
12. Un génie est chez nous 1984
13. Un génie gai nickelé 1985
14. Un génie un peu nigaud 1986
15. Hi.Fi.Génie 1987
16. Le génie sans bouillir 1988
17. Le génie se multiplie 1989
18. Génial Olivier 1963
19. Le retour du génial Olivier 1964
20. Olivier baby-sitter 1966

== See also ==
• Marcinelle school

• Belgian comics

• Franco-Belgian comics
