= Jean Roba =

Belgian comics author

Roba
- Jean Roba
- Born: 28 July 1930 Schaerbeek, Belgium
- Died: 14 June 2006 (aged 75) Brussels, Belgium
- Areas: artist, writer
- Notable works: Boule et Bill
- Awards: full list

Jean Roba (28 July 1930 – 14 June 2006) was a Belgian comics author from the Marcinelle school. His best-known work is Boule et Bill.

== Biography ==
Jean Roba was born in Schaerbeek, Belgium. In his youth, he was a reader of French magazines like Robinson and Mickey, which featured mainly American comics. One of those that was especially influential on Roba was Katzenjammer Kids. After working as an illustrator for different magazines and publicity agencies, he started to work as an illustrator for Spirou magazine in 1957, where he made small cartoons for the front page for a few years. He also worked on Bonnes Soirées, another magazine from the same publisher Dupuis, where he continued the series Sa majesté mon mari after Albert Uderzo stopped. For Spirou, he made a few short stories with Yvan Delporte and collaborated on different stories of Spirou et Fantasio with André Franquin, who taught him the basics of making comics, before starting his own main series Boule et Bill in 1959, initially with stories by Maurice Rosy. Next to this series of mainly one-page comics, he started in 1962 La Ribambelle about a group of kids from various countries and racial backgrounds.

Roba was both an artist and writer, and wrote most of his own gags for Boule et Bill, while others contributed stories for La Ribambelle. He handed over the drawing of Boule et Bill to Laurent Verron after more than 1000 pages. His work has been translated in fourteen languages and has sold in excess of 25 million copies. He lived in Jette from 1951 until his death in Brussels in 2006.

In 2005, he ended on No. 100 in the election for Le plus grand Belge (The Greatest Belgian). On 6 June 2006, Roba died in Brussels, Belgium of natural causes at the age of 75.

== Bibliography ==
Series	Years	Albums	Editor	Remarks
Boule et Bill	1962–2005	21	Dupuis, 4 albums Dargaud	some early scenarios by Maurice Rosy
La Ribambelle	1965–1984	6	Dupuis	with stories by Vicq, Yvan Delporte and Maurice Tillieux
Spirou et Fantasio	1959–1960	2	Dupuis	co-artist with André Franquin on Tembo Tabou and Spirou et les hommes-bulles

== Awards ==
- 1978: Angoulême International Comics Festival, Best foreign comical work, for Boule et Bill
- 1981: Angoulême International Comics Festival, Best comic for 9 to 12 years old, for Boule et Bill: Bill est maboul
- 1992: Chevalier des Arts et Lettres, France

Roba was also a Knight in the Order of Léopold.

== Sources ==
- Roba publications in Spirou, Pif gadget BDoubliées (in French)
- Roba albums Bedetheque (in French)

Footnotes
