= Poussy =

Belgian comic strip by Peyo, 1949–1973

- The main character with the logo of the series
- Author: Peyo
- Illustrator: Peyo
- Launch date: 1949
- End date: 1973
- Publisher: Dupuis
- Genre(s): Gag-a-day comics, pantomime comics

Poussy (literally: Pussy, and published in English as Pussycat) is a Belgian comic strip created in 1949 by Peyo. It is a gag-a-day comic about a cute black cat whose curiosity often gets him into trouble.

== Concept ==
Peyo created Poussy on January 22, 1949, for the Belgian newspaper Le Soir. It was his second series after Johan and Peewit, created three years earlier. It was also published in the comics magazine Spirou and released in album format by the Dupuis editions.

The main character in the series is Poussy, a black-and-white cat who exhibits normal cat-like behavior, such as trying to catch mice, find food, and run away from danger. His owner is a nameless little blond boy. All the gags are mostly without dialogue.

Originally the gags were published in Le Soir in black-and-white. From 1965 on, Spirou published the series in color. In 1969, Peyo's assistant, Lucien De Gieter, took over the series until 1973. In 1976 and 1977 the colorized gags were finally published in album format; three albums have been published.

== Albums ==
- Poussy (1965)
- Ça, c'est Poussy (1976) ("That's Pussy")
- Faut pas Poussy (1976) ("Don't do that, Pussy!")
- Poussy Poussa (1977) ("Poussy Carries On")

=== Reissues ===
- Intégrale Peyo (1988)
- Poussy : L'Intégrale 1965-1977 (2014), illustrated by Peyo, Lucien De Gieter, Daniel Desorgher, Éric Closter & Philippe Delzenne

== In other languages ==
Poussy has been translated into the following languages:

- Dutch: "Poesie"
- German: "Pussy"
- Spanish: "Pusy", "Poussy"
- Swedish: "Katten Karlsson"

== See also ==
• Marcinelle school
