= Jerry Spring =

Comic book series

Cover of Jerry Spring #1 (1955)

Jerry Spring is a Franco-Belgian Western comics series created by the Belgian artist Jijé. It made its debut in Spirou magazine on March 4, 1954.

The character aimed to replace the American-made Red Ryder as Belgian publisher Dupuis, which had long paid for the series' license, was growing increasingly dissatisfied with its declining quality. Jijé was Dupuis' jack-of-all-trades, and had already authored a few custom-made pages for Red Ryder during World War II, when the political climate disrupted the availability of the American originals. According to the artist's son, however, his love of the Western genre was sincere and, among his diverse output, Jerry Spring was most representative of his personal affinities. The replacement of Red Ryder by Jerry Spring marked the end of American comics in Spirou, which from now on would be fully based on homegrown material.

== Bibliography ==
Title (pages)	Spirou	Writer / Artist	1st publication, Belgium	Integrale
Jerry Spring (44)	1954	Jijé / Jijé	Album 1: Golden Creek - Le secret de la mine abandonnée, 1955	1
Le splendide cavalier (44)	1954	Rosy / Jijé	Album 2: Yucca Ranch, 1955	1
Le visage pâle (44)	1955	Jijé / Jijé	Album 3: Lune d'argent, 1956	1
La révolution méxicaine (44)	1955	Jijé / Jijé	Album 4: Trafic d'armes, 1957	1
La passe des indiens (44)	1955	Jijé / Jijé	Album 5: La passe des indiens, 1957	2
La piste du grand nord (24)	1956	Jijé / Jijé	Album 6: La piste du grand nord, 1958	2
L'or du vieux Lender (20)	1956	Goscinny / Jijé	Album 6: La piste du grand nord, 1958	2
Le ranch de la malchance (16)	1956	Jijé / Jijé	Album 7: Le ranch de la malchance, 1959	2
Enquête à San Juan (21)	1957	Jijé / Jijé	Album 7: Le ranch de la malchance, 1959	2
Le testament de l'oncle Tom (8)	1957	Jijé / Jijé	Album 7: Le ranch de la malchance, 1959	2
Les 3 barbus de Sonoyta (44)	1957	Acquaviva / Jijé	Album 8: Les 3 barbus de Sonoyta, 1959	2
Fort Red Stone (44)	1958	Philip / Jijé	Album 9: Fort Red Stone, 1960	3
Le maître de la sierra (44)	1960	Philip / Jijé	Album 10: Le maître de la sierra, 1960	3
La route de Coronado (44)	1961	Philip / Jijé & Giraud	Album 11: La route de Coronado, 1962	3
El Zopiloté (44)	1962	Jijé / Jijé	Album 12: El Zopiloté, 1964	3
Pancho hors la loi (44)	1963	Jijé / Jijé	Album 13: Pancho hors la loi, 1964	4–5
Les broncos du Montana (44)	1963	Jijé / Jijé	Album 14: Les broncos du Montana, 1965	4–5
Mon ami Red Lover (27)	1964	Philip / Jijé	Album 15: Mon ami Red, 1965	4–5
Le loup solitaire (17)	1964	Dubois / Jijé	Album 15: Mon ami Red, 1965	4–5
Les Vengeurs du Sonore (44)	1965	Jijé / Jijé	Double Album 2: Les vengeurs du Sonora + Lune d'argent, 1974 (2nd publication: Album 19: Les Vengeurs du Sonore, 1985)	4–5
Jerry contre K.K.K. (44)	1966	Lob / Jijé	Double Album 4: Jerry contre KKK + La passe des indiens, 1975 (2nd publication: Album 20: Jerry contre KKK, 1986)	4–5
Le Duel (44)	1966	Lob / Jijé	Double Album 1: Le duel + Golden Creek, 1974 (2nd publication: Album 18: Le Duel, 1984)	4–5
L'or de personne (46)	1974	Philip / Jijé	Double Album 3: L'or de personne + Trafic d'armes, 1975 (2nd publication: Album 21: L'or de personne, 1987)	4–5
La fille du canyon (46)	1976	Philip / Jijé	Album 16: La fille du canyon, 1977	4–5
Le Grand Calumet (46)	1977	Philip / Jijé	Album 17: La grand calumet, 1978	4–5
Colère apache (46)	—	Festin / Franz	Album 22: Colère Apache, 1990	

== Sources ==
- Jerry Spring publications in Spirou BDoubliées (in French)
