= François Walthéry =

Belgian comics artist (born 1946)

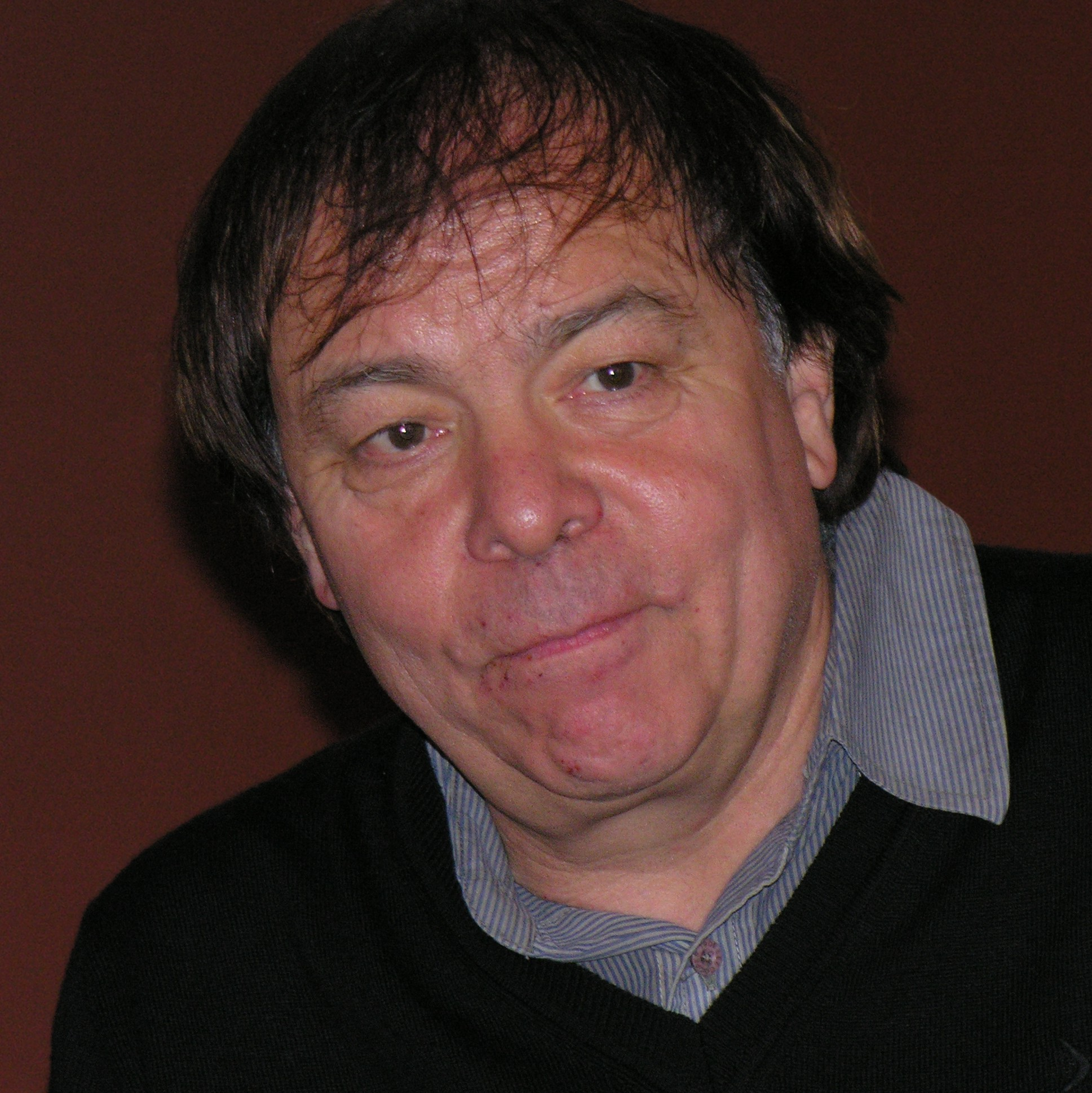
- Walthéry at the 2008 Helsinki Comics Festival
- Born: 17 January 1946 (age 80) Argenteau, Belgium
- Area: Artist
- Notable works: Natacha; Rubine

François Walthéry (born 17 January 1946) is a Belgian comics artist, best known for his series featuring an adventurous flight attendant, Natacha.

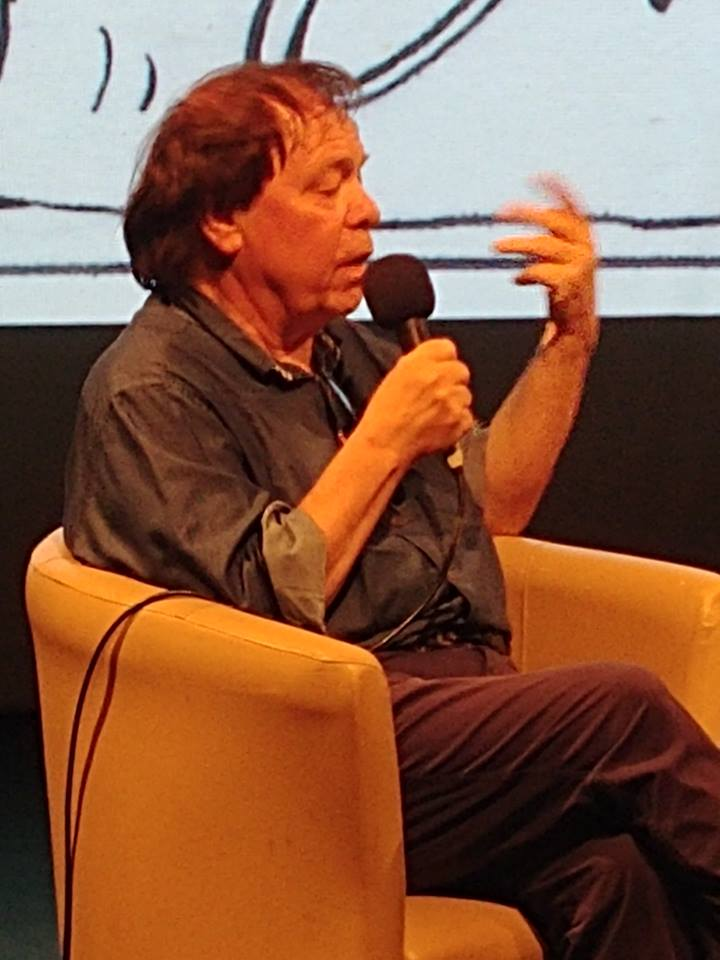
François Walthéry in a conference at Centre Wallonie-Bruxelles of Paris, 14 June 2018.

== Biography ==
Walthéry began his career in 1962 during studies at the Institut Saint-Luc in Liège, when he collaborated with scenario writer Mittéï to create his first comic, Pipo. The following year, Walthéry started working for Peyo, assisting on The Smurfs, Johan et Pirlouit and Benoît Brisefer. Eventually he assumed creative responsibility of the series Jacky et Célestin, taking over from Will.

He started his best known work series in 1967, working with a script by Gos to create Natacha. Several years in the making, the series did not make its debut until 26 February 1970, in the Franco-Belgian comics magazine Spirou.

== Partial bibliography ==
Natacha, hôtesse de l'air (1971)

- Natacha
1. Natacha, hôtesse de l'air (written by Gos), Dupuis, 1971.
2. Natacha et le Maharadjah (written by Gos), Dupuis, 1972.
3. La mémoire de métal (written by Étienne Borgers), Dupuis, 1974. Also contains Un brin de panique (written by Marc Wasterlain)
4. Un Trône pour Natacha (written by Maurice Tillieux), Dupuis, 1975.
5. Double vol, (written by Mittéï and Walthéry, Dupuis), 1976. Also contains L'étoile du berger (written by Gos) and Un tour de passe-passe (written by Lemasque).
6. Le treizième apôtre (written by Maurice Tillieux), Dupuis, 1978.
7. L'hôtesse et Mona Lisa (written by Mittéï, additional art by Pierre Seron), Dupuis, 1979. Also contains Natacha et les petits miquets (written by Walthéry and Mittéï).
8. Instantanés pour Caltech (written by Étienne Borgers, additional art by Jidéhem), Dupuis, 1981.
9. Les machines incertaines (written by Étienne Borgers, additional art by Jidéhem), Dupuis, 1983.
10. L'ile d'outre-monde (written by Marc Wasterlain, additional art by Will), Dupuis, 1984.
11. Le grand pari (written by Mittéï, additional art by Laudec), Dupuis, 1985.
12. Les culottes de fer (written by Mittéï, additional art by Laudec), Dupuis, 1986.
13. Les nomades du ciel (written by Raoul Cauvin, additional art by Laudec), Dupuis, 1988.
14. Cauchemirage (written by Mythic, additional art by Mittéï), Marsu Productions, 1989.
15. La ceinture du Cherchemidi (written by Peyo, additional art by Mittéï), Marsu Productions, 1992.
16. L'ange blond (written by Maurice Tillieux, additional art by Georges Van Linthout), Marsu Productions, 1994.
17. La veuve noire (written by Michel Dusart, additional art by Georges Van Linthout), Marsu Productions, 1997.
18. Natacha et les dinosaures (written by Marc Wasterlain), Marsu Productions, 1998.
- Le Vieux Bleu (written by Raoul Cauvin), Dupuis, 1980 translated in Walloon under the title Li vî Bleû
- Le p'tit bout d'chique
1. Le p'tit bout d'chique, Marsu Productions, 1989
2. Bout à bout (written by Serdu), Marsu Productions, 1992
- Rubine
1. Les mémoires troubles (written by Mythic), Le Lombard, 1993
2. Fenêtre sur rue (written by Mythic), Le Lombard, 1994
3. Le second témoin (written by Mythic), Le Lombard, 1995
  ...later continued by other artists.

== Sources ==
- François Walthéry publications in Spirou BDoubliées (in French)
- François Walthéry albums Bedetheque (in French)
