= Bobo (Belgian comic) =

Belgian comic strip, 1961 to 1997

- Main character with the logo used from 1989
- Author(s): Paul Deliège, Maurice Rosy
- Illustrator: Paul Deliège
- Current status/schedule: Discontinued
- Launch date: 1961
- End date: 1997
- Publisher: Dupuis
- Genre(s): Humor comics, gag cartoon
- Original language: French

Bobo is a Franco-Belgian comics series created by Paul Deliège and Maurice Rosy. The series features an eponymous prisoner of the jail Inzepocket ("in the pocket" with a French accent). In Dutch, the series' name is Jaap.

== History ==
Bobo first appeared in a mini–récit (mini-story) in Spirou magazine on May 11, 1961 In the early years, it was written by Rosy, who also took artistic responsibility during a brief period in the 1970s. Eventually, the character evolved into its own series, mostly consisting of short stories, and a few full length (i.e. 44 pages) stories. Fifteen albums appeared until the 1990s, when the series ended its run.

== Synopsis ==
Bobo was sentenced to twenty years in jail for stealing a bicycle (it was the bicycle of the sentencing judge). Bobo is always trying to escape in various ways, usually by digging, and thus make his way to the beaches of Acapulco. Other major characters are the prison's manager who is fond of pies and cookies; the prison bully who has it in for Bobo and his various schemes; the Professional, a grumpy old prisoner, who insists that everything be done "by the book," his copy of which dates back to before the prison reform movement (at his insistence, the Professional lives in an old dungeon, wears a ball-and-chain, does heavy labor and only eats stale bread and dirty water); and Stonie the warden, who always carries a stone (left over after building the prison), and which he is constantly trying to get rid off, but his colleagues insist that he carries. There is also Julot-les-pinceaux (Julian Brush), Bobo's outside accomplice who is always coming up with various schemes to get his beloved boss out of the nick.

== Computer game ==
A six-stage computer game was made was released for Atari ST and Commodore Amiga by Infogrames Entertainment. The player steers Bobo through six tasks: feeding soup to his increasingly hungry inmates in the mess hall; peeling an ever-increasing mount of potatoes; cleaning the floor of the prison office hallway; helping his numerous mates escape via a trampoline; running over a set of three high-mounted power lines; and finally, stopping your cellmates from snoring when you are trying to sleep.

The purpose of the game is not to reach a certain goal, but to collect as many points as possible in the short space of time given in most of the tasks. Failing in these task is inevitable—like in the first, the inmates get hungry very quickly as time passes, and eventually someone puts the soup pot on Bobo's head; and in the third an increasing number of guardsmen, dogs and inmates keep running through the hallway, staining the floor with their dirty shoes.

== Albums ==
Cover of Le Prince de l'évasion (1964)

=== Pocket series ===
Scenario: Maurice Rosy - Illustrations: Paul Deliège

1. Bobo, le Prince de l'évasion (1964)
2. 4 aventures de Bobo, le Prince de l'évasion (1964)
3. Bobo aux sports d'hiver (1964)
4. Bobo se déguise (1965)
5. Bobo au sommet (1965)
6. Une baballe pour Bobo (1965)
7. Bobo fait le mur (1966)
8. Bobo et l’amie Pierre (1966)

=== Comic book series ===
Scenario and illustrations: Paul Deliège

1. Bobo prend l'air (1977)
2. Bobo prend la mer (1978)
3. Bobo comic's troupier (1980)
4. Un sac en cavale (1981)
5. Destination Lune (1982) (Deliège, Didgé, Julos)
6. L'Homme obus (1983)
7. La Pri$on dorée (1985)
8. Le Volontaire (1986)
9. e Professionnel (1987)
10. La Carpette violente (1988)
11. Le Retour du Greffé (1989)
12. L'Escalade (1990)
13. L'Oiseau du diable vauvert (1991)
14. Bobo fait le mur (1992)
15. La Rançon de la gloire (1994)
16. La Première pierre (1997)

== See also ==
• Marcinelle school • Belgian comics • Franco-Belgian comics
