= Le Vieux Nick et Barbe-Noire =

Belgian comic strip (1963–2017)

- Main characters with the series logo
- Author(s): Marcel Remacle, Marcel Denis
- Illustrator: Marcel Remacle
- Current status/schedule: Discontinued
- Launch date: 1964
- End date: 1985
- Syndicate(s): Dupuis
- Genre(s): Humor comics, Adventure

Le Vieux Nick et Barbe-Noire (literally Old Nick and Blackbeard; formerly Le Vieux Nick) is a Belgian comics series by Marcel Remacle. Set in the 18th century, the series depicts the misadventures of Old Nick, an old sailor, known for his trickery, as he battles his main enemy, Blackbeard. It was published between 1958 and 1990.

== Protagonists ==
- Old Nick, an old sailor. Despite his sickly appearance, his is very fit. A cunning character, he uses his wits and trickery to overcome his enemies, most of the time.
- Blackbeard, Old Nick's main foe. Though dreaded by many, he is dumb by nature.
- Grandpa, the grandpa of Blackbeard. He has a tendency to slap his grandson. He relies on the use of a walking stick to enable him to walk.
- Sebastian, a harpooner. He was discovered in a wrecked ship by Old Nick.

== Albums ==
1. Pavillons noirs (1960), 2nd print (1982)
2. Le vaisseau du diable (1960), 2nd print (1982)
3. Les mangeurs de citron (1961), 2nd print (1983)
4. L'île de la main ouverte (1962), 2nd print (1983)
5. Les mutinés de la Sémillante (1962), 2nd print (1983)
6. Dans la gueule du dragon (1963), 2nd print (1984)
7. Aux mains des Akwabons (1964), 2nd print (1984)
8. Sa majesté se rebiffe (1964), 2nd print (1984)
9. L'or du "El Terrible" (1965), 2nd print (1985)
10. Le trois-mâts fantôme (1967), 2nd print (1985)
11. Les boucaniers (1967), 2nd print (1986)
12. Barbe-Noire et les indiens (1968)
13. Les mésaventures de Barbe-Noire (1969)
14. Les commandos du roy (1969)
15. Barbe-Noire aubergiste (1971)
16. La prise de Canapêche (1972)
17. Barbe-Noire joue et perd (1973)
18. Le feu de la colère (1974)
19. Sous la griffe de Lucifer (1975)
20. Les nouvelles mésaventures de Barbe-Noire (1976)
21. La princesse et le pirate (1977)
22. Sous les voiles (1979)
23. Barbe-Noire, Hercule et Cie (1981)
24. Le mal étrange (1982)
25. Barbe-Noire prend des risques (1983)
26. L'île rouge (1985)

== See also ==
• Marcinelle school

• Belgian comics

• Franco-Belgian comics
