= Isabelle (comics) =

Belgian comic series

- Author(s): André Franquin, Yvan Delporte, Raymond Macherot
- Illustrator: Will
- Current status/schedule: Discontinued
- Launch date: 1969
- End date: 1995
- Publisher(s): Dupuis, Le Lombard
- Genre(s): Adventure, Fantasy

Isabelle was a Belgian comic series drawn by Will and written by André Franquin, Delporte and Raymond Macherot.

The comic first appeared in Spirou magazine in 1969. Created by a top team of already-famous contributors to the magazine, the series gained a small but fanatical following. The first stories were written by Franquin (of Gaston Lagaffe fame), Delporte (editor of Spirou and writer of many comics) and Macherot (creator of Sibylline). Later, Delporte alone wrote the stories in collaboration with Will. Twelve albums were published until the series ended with Will's death in 2000.

== Plot ==
The little girl Isabelle (named after Franquin's daughter) gets into a lot of adventures when the evil witch Kalendula troubles Isabelle's uncle Hermès and his fiancée, the good witch Calendula (who is the descendant of the evil Kalendula). Other stories are about a magical painting, a flying village or a floating island.

The stories have a poetical tone, although mixed with tons of jokes and puns, rhyming ghosts, a talking diamond and Isabelle's down-to-earth aunt – whose greatest concern when Isabelle gets into an adventure is whether she's dressed warmly enough, even when she descends into Hades. The drawings are packed with details and the poetic nature of the stories comes through in the imaginative animals and backgrounds.

== Main characters ==
Main characters Isabelle and Calendula

- Isabel, an apparently normal girl who in reality experiences extraordinary adventures
- Hermes, magician and Isabelle's uncle
- Calendula, a witch Hermes is in love with
- Kalendula, cruel witch and grandmother of the previous one
- Chuintufle, a critter of darkness, with the appearance of a hairy worm
- Ursula, Isabel's aunt who bakes cakes and pies, but is not aware of Isabel's adventures

== Albums ==
1. Le tableau enchanté (1972)
2. Isabelle et le Capitaine (January 1983)
3. Les maléfices de l'oncle Hermès (July 1978)
4. L'astragale de Cassiopée (April 1979)
5. Un empire de dix arpents (June 1980)
6. L'étang des sorciers (October 1981)
7. L'envoûtement du Népenthés (August 1986)
8. La lune gibbeuse (June 1991)
9. La Traboule de la Géhenne (April 1992)
10. Le sortilège des gâtines (January 1993)
11. Le Grand Bonbon (May 1994)
12. Les Abraxas pernicieux (May 1995)

== Reprints ==
All the stories have been reprinted in 2007 in three omnibus editions by Le Lombard.

== See also ==
• Marcinelle school
