= Tif et Tondu =

Belgian comic strip issued 1938–1997

- Main characters with the series logo
- Author(s): Fernand Dineur, Will, Marcel Denis, Alain Sikorski, Blutch
- Illustrator(s): Fernand Dineur, Luc Bermar, Maurice Rosy, Marcel Denis, Maurice Tillieux, Stephen Desberg, Denis Lapière, Maurice Kornblum, Robber
- Current status/schedule: Discontinued
- Launch date: 1938
- End date: 1997
- Publisher(s): Dupuis
- Genre(s): Adventure, crime

Tif et Tondu (Tif and Tondu) is a Belgian comic strip about a duo of private investigators, originally created, written and drawn by Fernand Dineur. Several artists and writers have worked on the series but the most popular version is that drawn by Will, with writers Maurice Rosy, Maurice Tillieux, and Stephen Desberg. The strip first started in 1938 and lasted until 1997, just one year short of its 60th birthday.

== Main characters ==
Tif and Tondu are adventurers and detectives who solve cases around the world, from the United States to the Congo. The central irony of the series' title was that the two friends had names which actually better suited the other:

Tif and Tondu by Will

- Tif is French slang for "hair" yet the character is bald-headed and clean-shaven. He also tends to be more reckless and has an eye for the ladies.
- Tondu is the French for "sheared" but he wears thick hair and beard. He is also more level-headed and is the brains of the partnership. He often takes up journalism when short of money.

== Publication history ==
=== The beginning ===
The series made its debut on 21 April 1938 in the first issue of Spirou magazine as Aventures de Tif, written and drawn by Fernand Dineur. Within a few issues Tif had made the acquaintance of Tondu, a shipwrecked sea captain, and the two joined forces, traveling the world in search of adventure.

In 1949, Dineur passed the drawing over to Will, but continued to provide the scenarios for the next three years before retiring from the strip. At this time, their adventures were also published in Héroic Albums, drawn by Dineur.

Another artist, Marcel Denis, also contributed a handful of stories in the early 1960s.

Will himself worked on the strip for almost 40 years in collaboration with various writers. This period, kept together by his distinctive drawing and handling of the characters, is seen as the strip's golden age.

=== The golden age and Monsieur Choc ===
Will's first strips post-Dineur were short-lived collaborations with writers Henri Gillain (aka Luc Bermar) and Albert Desprechins (aka Ben), but then Maurice Rosy came along and worked on the strip till 1968. It was Rosy who created one of the series' most memorable characters: the villain Monsieur Choc.

Monsieur Choc (in English it would be "Mister Shock") was the leader of a major criminal organisation called "La Main blanche" ("the White Hand"). His habitual outfit was a tuxedo and a knight's helmet which covered his head. His true identity was never revealed. When he did not wear his helmet he used face-masks, make-up or bandages. In one adventure it was only in the very last panel that Tif and Tondu discovered that it was Choc that they had been fighting all along. On one occasion, in a short story published in 1976, Tif and Tondu did get to see a photo of Choc's face, but it was not of much use since it was one of him as a sweet little baby !

Choc came up with increasingly fanciful ways of taking over the world. These included a giant robot (Le Réveil de Toar, 1966), the manipulation of dreams (Le Grand combat, 1967) or becoming invisible (Traitement de Choc, 1984).

Other characters from this period included the young Countess Amélie d'Yeu (known as Kiki), Inspector Ficshusset of Scotland Yard and Inspector Allumette of the French Sûreté, who ably led the official struggle against Choc. In accordance with the attitude of French censors of the time, who disapproved of bungling police officers, Allumette (whose name means "matchstick") was treated respectfully; in fact he was often shown as a step ahead of even Tif and Tondu.

Rosy was succeeded by Maurice Tillieux (from L'ombre sans corps on) who brought to the series the mixture of humour and mystery that he had employed in others such as Gil Jourdan. Tillieux died in a car crash in 1978 and his assistant Stephen Desberg took over (from Le gouffre interdit on).

Desberg used the strip to highlight more political and social issues: the use of cheating in sport for monetary gain (Échecs et match!, 1981); the world-wide reach of organised crime (Dans les griffes de la main blanche, 1986); and the influence of the extreme right-wing in the south of France (Les Phalanges de Jeanne d'Arc, 1987, and La Tentation du bien, 1989). Desberg also reintroduced the character of Choc who had been noticeably absent during the Tillieux period.

=== The decline ===
In 1990, Will and Desberg turned to other projects. Starting with Prise d'otages, writer Denis Lapière and artist Alain Sikorski took over, turning the strip into a more mundane detective series. After saving the world on several occasions, Tif and Tondu were now simple, everyday private detectives with an office in Paris. Tondu also married a girl called Mona. Their investigations focused mainly on such cases as fraud, forgery, murder and kidnapping. At their best, the stories looked at aspects of police procedure and that of other emergency services, but there was still little of the high-profile confrontations of the Will era.

The strip ended in 1997.

== Bibliography ==
Although the adventures of Tif and Tondu date back to 1938, only the ones dated from 1954 onwards are available in book form — this being its most popular period.

=== Original albums ===
1. La villa Sans-souci
2. Le trésor d'Alaric, 1954
3. Tif et Tondu en Amérique centrale, 1954
4. Oscar et ses mystères, 1955
5. Tif et Tondu contre la main blanche, 1956
6. Le retour de Choc, 1958
7. Passez muscade, 1958
8. Plein gaz, 1959
9. Tif et Tondu (in Bibor et Tribar), 1960
10. La villa du Long-Cri, 1966
11. Choc au Louvre, 1966
12. Les flèches de nulle part, 1967
13. La poupée ridicule, 1968
14. Le reveil de Toar, 1968
15. Le grand combat, 1968
16. La matière verte, 1969
17. Tif rebondit, 1969
18. L'ombre sans corps, 1970
19. Tif et Tondu contre le cobra, 1971
20. Le roc maudit, 1972
21. Sorti des abîmes, 1972
22. Les ressucités, 1973
23. Le scaphandrier mort, 1974
24. Un plan démoniaque, 1975
25. Tif et Tondu à New York, 1975
26. Aventure birmane, 1976
27. Le retour de la bête, 1977
28. Le gouffre interdit, 1978
29. Les passe-montagnes, 1979
30. Métamorphoses, 1980
31. Le sanctuaire oublié, 1981
32. Echecs et match, 1982
33. Swastika, 1983
34. Traitement de Choc, 1984
35. Choc 235, 1985
36. Le fantôme du samouraï, 1986
37. Dans les griffes de la main blanche, 1986
38. Magdalena, 1987
39. Les phalanges de Jeanne d'Arc, 1988
40. La tentation du bien, 1989
41. Coups durs, 1991
42. Prise d'otages, 1993
43. A feu et à sang, 1993
44. L'assassin des trois villes soeurs, 1995
45. Les vieilles dames aux cent maisons, 1995
46. Fort cigogne, 1996
47. Le mystère de la chambre 43, 1997

=== Omnibus ===
1. Le diabolique M.Choc, 2007
2. Sur la piste du crime, 2007
3. Signé M.Choc, 2008
4. Echec au Mystificateurs, 2008
5. Choc mène la dance, 2009
6. Horizons Lointains, 2009

== In popular culture ==
The character of Monsieur Choc might have been the inspiration behind Benedict, the main character of Gary Gianni's Monstermen comic series (nowadays known as Corpus Monstrum), first published as a back-up to Mike Mignola's Hellboy in 1994. Benedict wears a tuxedo and a knight's helmet strikingly similar to Choc's, save for the hyperrealistic style in which it is depicted.

== Sources ==
- Tif et Tondu publications in Spirou BDoubliées (in French)
- Tif et Tondu albums Bedtheque (in French)
- Tif et Tondu article on Krinein (in French)

Footnotes
