= Boule et Bill =

Belgian comic

- Boule & Bill with the series logo

Publication information
- Publisher: Dupuis, Dargaud (in French); Cinebook Ltd (in English)
- Format: Bande dessinée
- Publication date: 1959–present
- Main character(s): Boule, Bill

Creative team
- Created by: Jean Roba, Maurice Rosy
- Written by: Jean Roba (until 2003)
- Artist: Jean Roba

Boule et Bill (known in English as Billy & Buddy) is a Belgian comic, created in 1959 by Jean Roba in collaboration with Maurice Rosy. In 2003, the artistic responsibility of the series was passed on to Roba's former assistant Laurent Verron. The stories center on a typical family: a man and his wife, their young son Boule and Bill the cocker spaniel.

== History ==
Boule et Bill first appeared in the Belgian comics magazine Spirou on December 24, 1959. The ambition was to make a sort of European Peanuts. The debut was made in a so-called mini-récit (mini-story), a story in 32 very small pages, printed on the inner spread of the magazine. Roba had until then mainly made illustrations for the magazine and had helped some other authors (including André Franquin), and now started with his own series. A few months later, a four-page comic with the same heroes appeared, and shortly thereafter Roba created a weekly one page comic. For the next twenty-five years, Boule et Bill was one of the most popular series of the magazine, and appeared mostly on the back cover. From 1961 to 1965, the strip appeared in British comic Valiant, renamed It's A Dog's Life. Boule's name was changed to Pete and Bill's was changed to Larry. Apart from those changes this strip was mostly the same. 21 Albums were edited by Dupuis until 1985, containing one long story and some 800 gags. Thereafter, Roba changed from editor, moving to Dargaud. In 2006, Jean Roba died, but he had announced that he wanted the series to be continued, and had appointed Verron as his successor.

== Story ==
Boule et Bill relates the homely adventures of seven-year-old boy Boule and his dog Bill, a Cocker Spaniel, as well as that of Boule's mother and father and Caroline the turtle. Bill, while slightly anthropomorphized, basically acts as a normal dog, and the whole series places comical adventures in the realistic setting of a normal family in a normal town, with normal lives. Most of the gags happen in or around the house, but also include an almost yearly holiday setting with the family travelling away from home, usually at the beach.

=== Characters ===
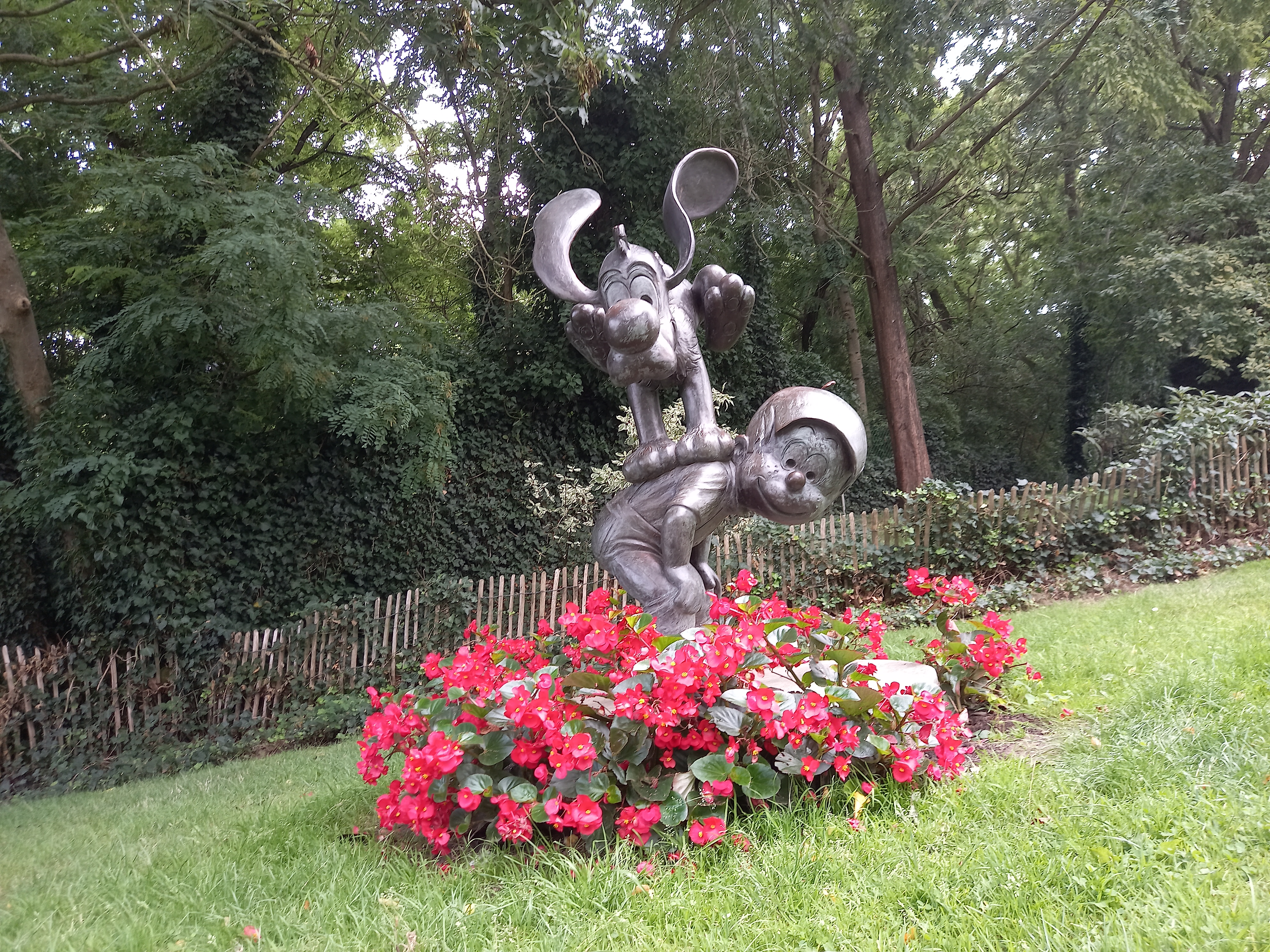
Statue of Boule & Bill in Jette, Belgium

- Boule is a young boy, always dressed in a blue overalls and a yellow T-shirt. He is an ordinary boy who goes to school and has friends with whom he plays a lot.
- Bill is a Cocker Spaniel. He can't speak but resorts to many tricks to make himself understood. He can communicate with other animals, such as his best friend, Caroline. He is very resourceful and cunning to find food, likes sleeping on sofas but dislikes bathing. Some of the most recurring gags revolve around Boule and his dad tricking Bill into a bathtub for a reluctant wash. His long ears provide him with many abilities.
- Boule's mother stays at home and complies with domestic tasks. Her concerns are to keep the house clean and to prevent disasters from Boule and Bill's ideas.
- Boule's father tries to educate his son properly by taking advantage of his questions and blunders. However, he fails most of the time, even if he is quite proud of his personal knowledge. He works for an advertising company, likes gardening and sleeping on the sofa, which is also appreciated by Bill, which provides some recurring gags.
- Caroline is a green tortoise who belongs to Boule's family. She lives in the garden. When Bill first met her, he feared she could eat his bones, but was then reassured, for she eats only lettuce. Caroline is insomniac.
- Madame Stick is the neighbour of Boule's family. The widow of a colonel, she is very strict and severe. She is the owner of Corporal, a cat who is Bill's arch enemy.
- Gérard is a young snobbish boy and owns a dog similar to him. He tries to dwarf Boule and Bill but ends up being overcome by their inventiveness.
- Monsieur Coupon-Dubois is the boss of Boule's father. A very respectable man, Boule's father sometimes invites him to his home or is being trusted with precious objects, and finds it difficult to prevent Bill's blunders.
- Pouf is Boule's best friend, but is also a rival for Bill, who often teases him. He wears long hair which covers most of his head and a cap.
- Hildegarde is Pouf's cousin who lives in the country. She appeared a few times in the series.
- Boule's teacher

== Original albums ==
Boule et Bill were first published by Dupuis in 1959, then from 1988 by Dargaud.

1. Tel Boule, tel Bill
2. Boule et Bill déboulent
3. Les Copains d'abord
4. Système Bill
5. Bulle et Bill
6. Tu te rappelles, Bill ?
7. Bill ou Face
8. Souvenirs de famille
9. Le fauve est lâché
10. Bill, chien modèle
11. Bill de match
12. Sieste sur ordonnance
13. Papa, Maman, Boule et... moi, 1972
14. Une vie de chien, 1973
15. Attention chien marrant !, 1974
16. Jeux de Bill, 1975
17. Ce coquin cocker, 1976
18. Carnet de Bill, 1976
19. Ras le Bill, 1977
20. Bill, nom d'un chien !, 1978
21. Bill est maboul, 1980
22. Globe-trotters, 1982
23. Strip-Cocker, 1984
24. Billets de Bill, 1987
25. Les V'là !, 1999
26. Faut rigoler !, 1999
27. Bwouf allo Bill ?, 1999
28. Les Quatre Saisons, 2001
29. Quel cirque !, 2003
30. La Bande à Bill, 2005
31. Graine de cocker, 2007
32. Mon meilleur Ami, 2009
33. À l'abordage !!, 2011
34. Un amour de cocker, 2013
35. Roule ma poule !, 2014
36. Flair de cocker, 2015
37. Bill est un gros rapporteur !, 2016
38. Symphonie en Bill majeur, 2017
39. Y a d'la promenade dans l'air, 2018
40. Bill à facettes, 2019
41. Bill se tient à Caro, 2020
42. Royal taquin, 2021
43. L'échappée Bill, 2022
44. Te fais pas d’Bill, 2023
45. Bill donne sa langue au chat !, 2024
46. Peinture à l'os, 2025

== Other publications ==
- In 1999, the Boule et Bill series was entirely reedited by Dupuis, in albums of 48 strips, whereas the former albums were composed of either 64, 56 or 48 pages. This series consists of 24 albums published by Dupuis plus three albums originally published by Dargaud and reedited. The nine first albums of the original collection were replaced by 14 albums with different names. The other albums kept their original names, apart from the former 22nd album which was renamed Les v'la!. This new series went on after Roba's death with three new albums drawn by Verron: Quel Cirque! (2003), La bande à Bill (2005), Graine de cocker (2007).
- In 1979 Une extraordinaire aventure de Boule et Bill: Bill a disparu ! was published in Spirou; written by André-Paul Duchateau, Bill goes missing and the various characters from Spirou magazine search for him.
- In 1987 L'album de famille de Boule et Bill was published by Dargaud.
- In 1997 Boule et Bill en famille was published.
- In 1999 Boule et Bill font la fête was published in commemoration of Boule et Bill's 40th anniversary.
- Four Best of Boule et Bill albums composed of previously published strips were published in 2003 and 2004: Plumes poils et compagnie, En vadrouille, Jeux d'hiver, and Home sweet home.
- A series of books for children was published in pocket format, illustrated by Roba and written by Fanny Joly, published by Mango as part of the Bibliomango line.
- An album, A l'école ... vite !, was published in 1999 by Atlas.
- Various special advertising albums were published.

== Translations ==
Cinebook has been publishing the books in English, with Boule and Bill renamed Billy and Buddy, respectively.

1. Remember this, Buddy? – Jun 2009 – ISBN 978-1-905460-91-5
2. Bored Silly with Billy – Sep 2010 – ISBN 978-1-84918-049-8
3. Friends First – Jun 2012 – ISBN 978-1-84918-124-2
4. It's a Dog's Life - Sep 2013 - ISBN 978-1-84918-171-6
5. Clowning Around - Jun 2014 - ISBN 978-1-84918-200-3
6. Buddy's Gang - Oct 2016 - ISBN 978-1-84918-314-7
7. Beware of (Funny) Dog! - Jul 2019 - ISBN 978-1-84918-457-1
8. Fetch and Carry On - Aug 2022 - ISBN 978-1-80044-070-8

The series is translated in about 15 other languages, in which the characters names also vary:

- Breton: Boulig ha Billig
- Catalan: Bola i Bill
- Finnish: Vili & Bill
- German: Schnieff und Schnuff
- Icelandic: Boule og Bill
- Italian: Bill e Bull
- Polish: Ptyś i Bill
- Spanish: Bill y Bolita
- Swedish: Bullen

== Impact ==
Boule et Bill is among the best-selling French-language comics, with 300,000 copies for the new album by Verron in 2009.

=== Film adaptations ===
Boule & Bill (2013) movie poster

In 2013, a Belgian-French-Luxembourgish film was released, "Boule et Bill (fr)", based on the comics. It stars Franck Dubosc as the father, Marina Foïs as the mother, and Charles Crombez as Bill. It was dubbed in different languages. The movie received bad reviews, but was commercially successful enough to warrant a sequel "Boule et Bill 2", released in 2017.

=== Television adaptations ===
Three animated television series based on Boule et Bill were produced:

- Boule et Bill (1975) broadcast on RTB
- Boule et Bill (2005) broadcast on TF1 with 104 episodes
- Boule et Bill (2015) broadcast on France 3 and directed by Philippe Vidal. It includes two seasons comprising 26 10-minute episodes.

=== Video game adaptations ===
A Nintendo DS video game based on the comic was launched in 2008 by Atari and Anuman Interactive.

=== Tributes ===
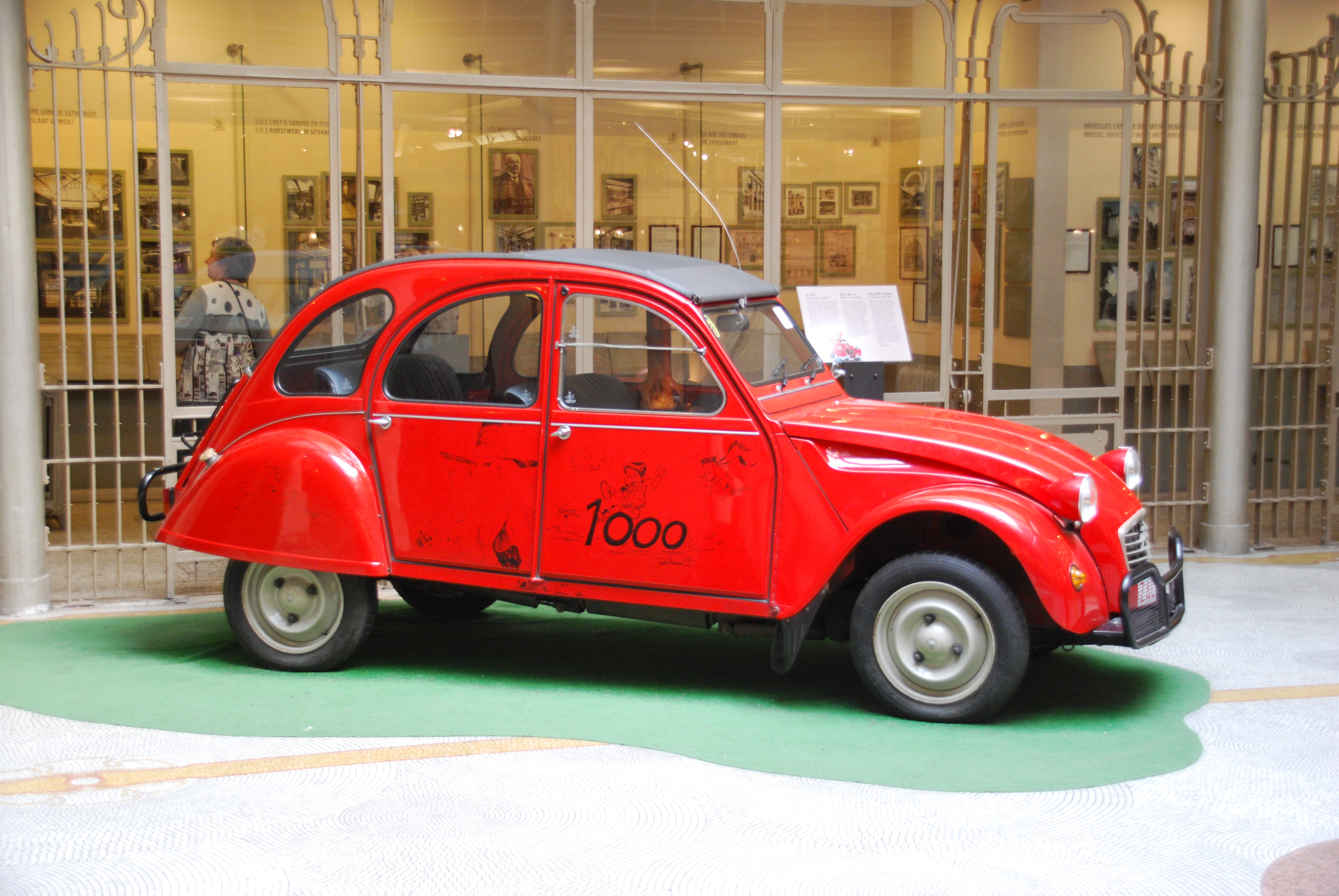
The Citroen 2CV of Boule and Bill, permanent in the Belgian Centre for Comic Strip Art in Brussels.

In the Belgian Comic Strip Center in Brussels the permanent exhibition brings homage to the pioneers of Belgian comics, among them Jean Roba and his series Boule et Bill.

Boule et Bill is among the many Belgian comics characters to jokingly have a Brussels street named after them. The Rue au Beurre/ Boterstraat has a commemorative plaque with the name Rue Boule et Bill / Bollie en Billie straat placed under the actual street sign.

In 1992 a wall painting representing Boule and Bill was painted in the Rue du Chevreuil in Brussels. It was designed by G. Oregopoulos and D. Vandegeerde.

In 2000 a statue of Boule and Bill was erected in Jette, Belgium, next to where Roba lived. It was sculpted by Tom Frantzen. In 2014 the statue was subject of vandalism.

In 2002 La Poste, France's post office system, issued two postage stamps illustrating Boule and Bill. Three out of eight were semi-postal stamps benefiting the French Red Cross.

== See also ==
- Marcinelle school

== Sources ==
- Boule et Bill publications in Spirou Archived 2007-04-08 at the Wayback Machine BDoubliées (in French)
- Boule et Bill albums Bedetheque (in French)
