= Paul Deliège =

Belgian artist and writer of comics

- Born: 21 January 1931 Olne, Liège, Belgium
- Died: 7 July 2005 (aged 74)
- Areas: Writer, Penciller, Inker

Paul Deliège (21 January 1931 – 7 July 2005) was a Belgian artist and writer of comics. He is most famous for his series Bobo.

== Biography ==
Deliège was born in Olne. He started in the daily Le Soir with Père Bricole et Félicien et les Romanis. In 1959, he got into éditions Dupuis where he launched les aventures de Théophile et Philibert with Vicq. at the start of the 1960s, he was the principal creator of the Mini-récits (mini-stories) in the magazine Spirou, where he created Bobo, his best-known hero. The series Les Krostons, about three green imps and their unsuccessful attempts to take over the world, (with Piroton) and Le trou du souffleur (The souffleur's hole) followed shortly. Deliège was also writer for the series Sam et l'Ours (Sam and the bear, drawn by Lagas) and some stories of Sybilline (drawn by Macherot).

The Krostons is being made into a 3-D film of the same name.

Deliège died of a heart attack in 2005.
