= Spirou (magazine) =

Weekly Franco-Belgian comics magazine

- Spirou No. 1 (21 April 1938); Front cover by Rob-Vel.

Publication information
- Publisher: Dupuis
- Schedule: Weekly
- Publication date: 21 April 1938 – present
- Main character: Spirou

Spirou (Note: Spirou is a Walloon word meaning "squirrel" or "lively kid".) (French: Le Journal de Spirou) is a weekly Belgian comics magazine published by the Dupuis company since April 21, 1938. It is an anthology magazine with new features appearing regularly, containing a mix of short humor strips and serialized features, of which the most popular series would be collected as albums by Dupuis afterwards.

== History ==
=== Creation ===
With the success of the weekly magazine Le Journal de Mickey in France, and the popularity of the weekly Adventures of Tintin in Le Petit Vingtième, many new comic magazines or youth magazines with comics appeared in France and Belgium in the second half of the 1930s. In 1936, the experienced publisher Jean Dupuis put his sons Paul and the 19-year-old Charles in charge of a new magazine aimed at the juvenile market.

First appearing 21 April 1938, it was a large format magazine, available only in French and only in Wallonia. It was a sixteen-page weekly comics magazine composed of a mixture of short stories and gags, serial comics and short articles. It introduced two new comics, the eponymous Spirou drawn by the young Frenchman Rob-Vel, and Les Aventures de Tif (later to become Tif et Tondu) written and drawn by Fernand Dineur, and printed American comics such as Superman, Red Ryder and Brick Bradford. On 27 October 1938 the Flemish edition named Robbedoes appeared as well.

=== Second World War ===
Spirou and Robbedoes soon became very popular and the magazine doubled its pages from 8 to 16. After the invasion of the Germans, the magazine gradually had to stop publishing American comics. They were at first continued by local artists and later replaced with new series. When Rob-Vel no longer had the possibility to send his pages from France to Belgium on a regular basis either, his series was continued by Joseph Gillain, a young artist who had previously worked for Petits Belges and used the pen name Jijé. Together with Dineur and Sirius (pen name of Max Mayeu), they filled the magazine with a number of new series and increased the popularity of it even further.

Near the end of the war, due to paper shortages, publication had to be stopped anyway, with only a few irregular almanacs to keep the bond with the readers intact and to provide work for the personnel to prevent them being deported to Germany.

=== The golden years ===
The period 1945–1960 has been described by critics as the golden age of Spirou magazine and of Belgian comics in general, partly incited by the 1946 appearance of the successful competitor Tintin magazine. Spirou resumed publication only weeks after Belgium was liberated, but now on a much smaller format. Jijé was the main author, providing pages from multiple series each week. Some American comics reappeared as well. Jijé started out a studio, where he schooled three talented apprentices, Will, André Franquin and Morris; known as the "Bande à quatre", "Gang of four", they began laying the foundation for the Marcinelle school that marked the magazine for decades.

In 1946 and 1947, the team was joined by some of the main contributors to Spirou for the next decades, including Victor Hubinon, Jean-Michel Charlier and Eddy Paape. After a few years, these artists started their now classic series like Buck Danny by Hubinon and Charlier and Lucky Luke by Morris, while Franquin took over Spirou from Jijé. Gradually, the American comics and reprints were replaced by new, European productions, and by the 50s, nearly all the content was made especially for the magazine. Charles Dupuis remained editor-in-chief of the magazine until 1955 when he appointed Yvan Delporte to that position, so he could himself focus on his increasing interest in the publication of the magazine's series' albums.

The golden ages culminated in the 1950s with the introduction of more authors and series like Peyo (Johan and Peewit in 1952, The Smurfs in 1958), René Follet, Marcel Remacle, Jean Roba (with Boule et Bill), Maurice Tillieux (with Gil Jourdan) and Mitacq. In 1954, Jijé created the realistic western comic Jerry Spring, and in 1957 Franquin introduced the anti-hero Gaston Lagaffe. The authors of the magazine, many of them pupils of Jijé, were grouped stylistically in the Marcinelle school, the counterpart of ligne claire exhibited by the artists grouped around Hergé in Tintin magazine (the main competitor for Spirou).

By 1960, the magazine had achieved a fixed structure and had grown to 52 pages, mainly filled with new, European (mainly Belgian) comics, coupled with some text pages (interaction with the readers) and adverts. Most of the comics were long-running series which were regularly published as albums of 44 or 64 pages, generating a constant source of revenue for the artists and the publisher. In the next decades, the sales of albums would become the main focus, reducing the importance of the magazine which became more of a breeding ground for new talent and series.

=== Rejuvenation in the 1960s and 1970s ===
In the early 1960s, the main changes were the strong editorial work of Delporte, who kept the magazine vibrant despite the more or less fixed series, with numerous supplements, games, and experimental layouts. The magazine demonstrated the pleasure that had gone in creating it, and maintained a strong reader base despite the growing competition from more adolescent and adult French magazines like Pilote. Some of the main authors (Jijé, Franquin, Will, and Hubinon) temporarily started working for other magazines, with Morris the only major name who definitely left the magazine. Their replacements, like Berck, had trouble filling the void.

Around 1959–1960, the first mini-récits (lit. mini-stories) appeared. This was an experiment in which the middle pages of the magazines could be removed, which the reader (armed with a pair of scissors, a stapler and some patience) could fold into a small comics magazine of its own. Several artists were allowed to hone their skills inside these mini-récits before moving on to larger pages, and until the 1970s, more than 500 mini-récits were produced, series that debuted in this format include The Smurfs by Peyo, Bobo by Rosy and Deliège, Flagada by Degotte among many others.

Only in the early 1970s, did a number of new success series and authors emerge. The main contributor for the next decades was Raoul Cauvin, a lithographer who worked as a cameraman for the Dupuis animation studios and wrote stories for series like Musti. He became the main story writer for Dupuis, with major series like Sammy with Berck, Les Tuniques Bleues with Lambil, and later Cédric with Laudec and Agent 212 with Daniel Kox, among many others. Other important new authors were François Walthery with Natacha and Roger Leloup with Yoko Tsuno, together with Isabelle by Will evidence of the new wave of adventurous female-oriented comics of the decade.

A commercial failure but artistic success came along in 1977, when Delporte created the more adult supplement Le Trombone Illustré, which appeared inside Spirou for thirty weeks, and showcased new artists like Didier Comès, Enki Bilal, Claire Bretécher, F'murr, Grzegorz Rosinski, and Frédéric Jannin, next to more established authors like René Hausman, Peyo, Roba, Gotlib, and Franquin, who started his third major series, Idées Noires.

=== Since 1980 ===
The early 1980s had Spirou and Robbedoes searching for a new, appealing identity, with new formulas, more adult comics like XIII by William Vance and Jean Van Hamme or Jeremiah by Hermann. Most artists of the first generation were no longer active, and the productivity of many artists of the second generation slowed down as well. New talents were Tome and Janry, the new team for the Spirou et Fantasio comic, Bruno Gazzotti (Soda), François Gilson (Mélusine), Bercovici, Zidrou, André Geerts, Bernard Hislaire, Midam (Kid Paddle), Frank Pé, Marc Hardy and Luc Cromheecke.

Robbedoes had a severe reduction in the number of readers, and was first reduced to 32 pages (with Spirou growing to 68), before it finally disappeared in 2005.

== Collections ==
From the very start, Spirou and Robbedoes published collections of 10 to 13 consecutive magazines in hardcover format - originally quarterly, but more frequently with the increased page number of the magazine. This series still continues for Spirou with 389 volumes as of August 2026.

== Spirou and Tintin rivalry ==
Since the 1940s, Spirou was in constant competition with Tintin magazine. If one artist was published by one of the magazines, he would not be published by the other one. This was a gentleman's agreement between the two publishers, Raymond Leblanc of Le Lombard and Charles Dupuis of Dupuis. One notable exception was André Franquin, who in 1955, after a dispute with its editor, moved from the more popular Spirou to Tintin. The dispute was quickly settled, but Franquin had signed an agreement with Tintin for five years. He created Modeste et Pompon for Tintin while pursuing work for Spirou. He quit Tintin at the end of his contract. Some artists moved from Spirou to Tintin like Eddy Paape and Liliane & Fred Funcken, while some went from Tintin to Spirou like Raymond Macherot and Berck.

== Main authors and series ==
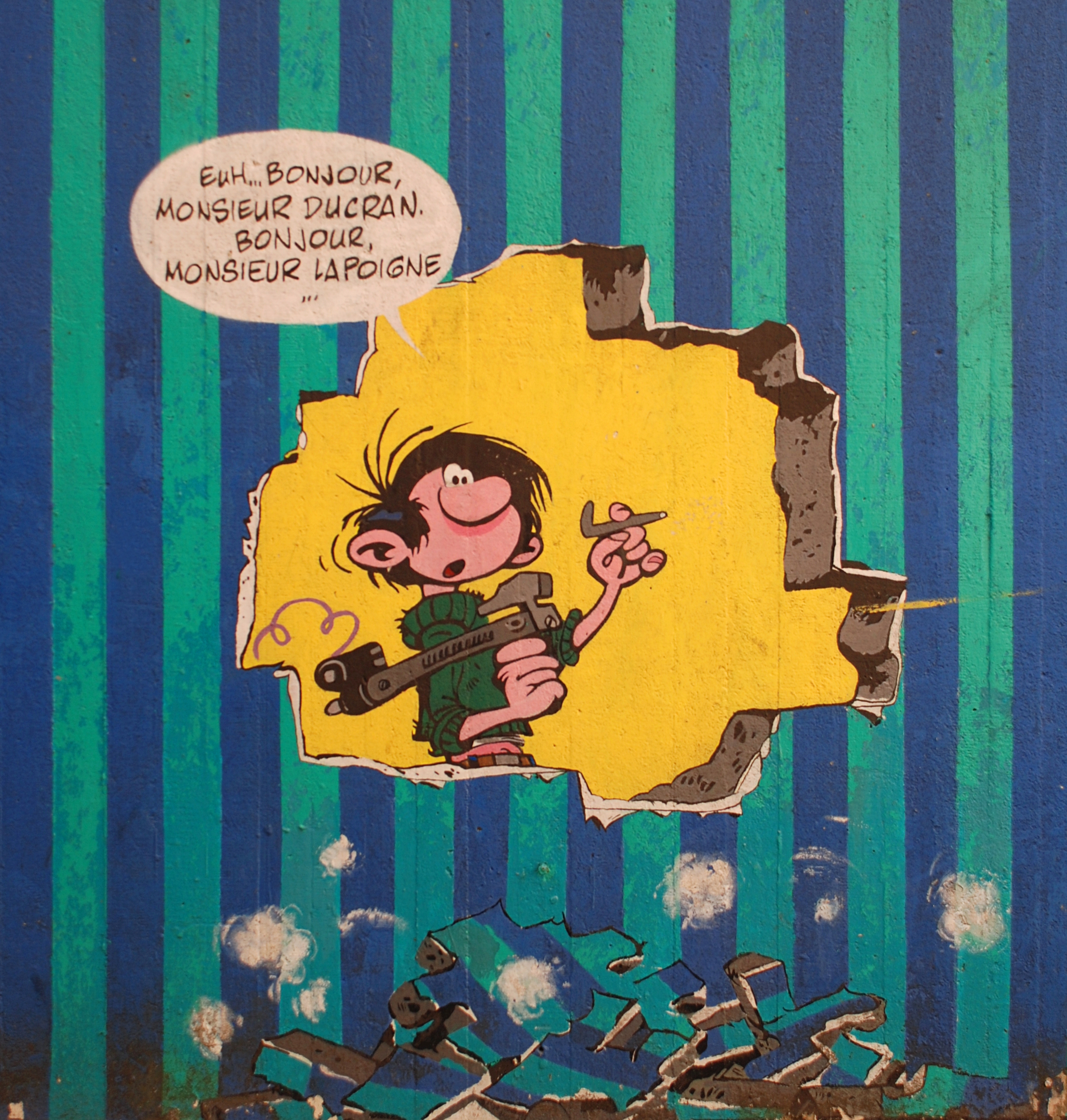
Mural painting representing Gaston Lagaffe in Louvain-la-Neuve (Belgium).

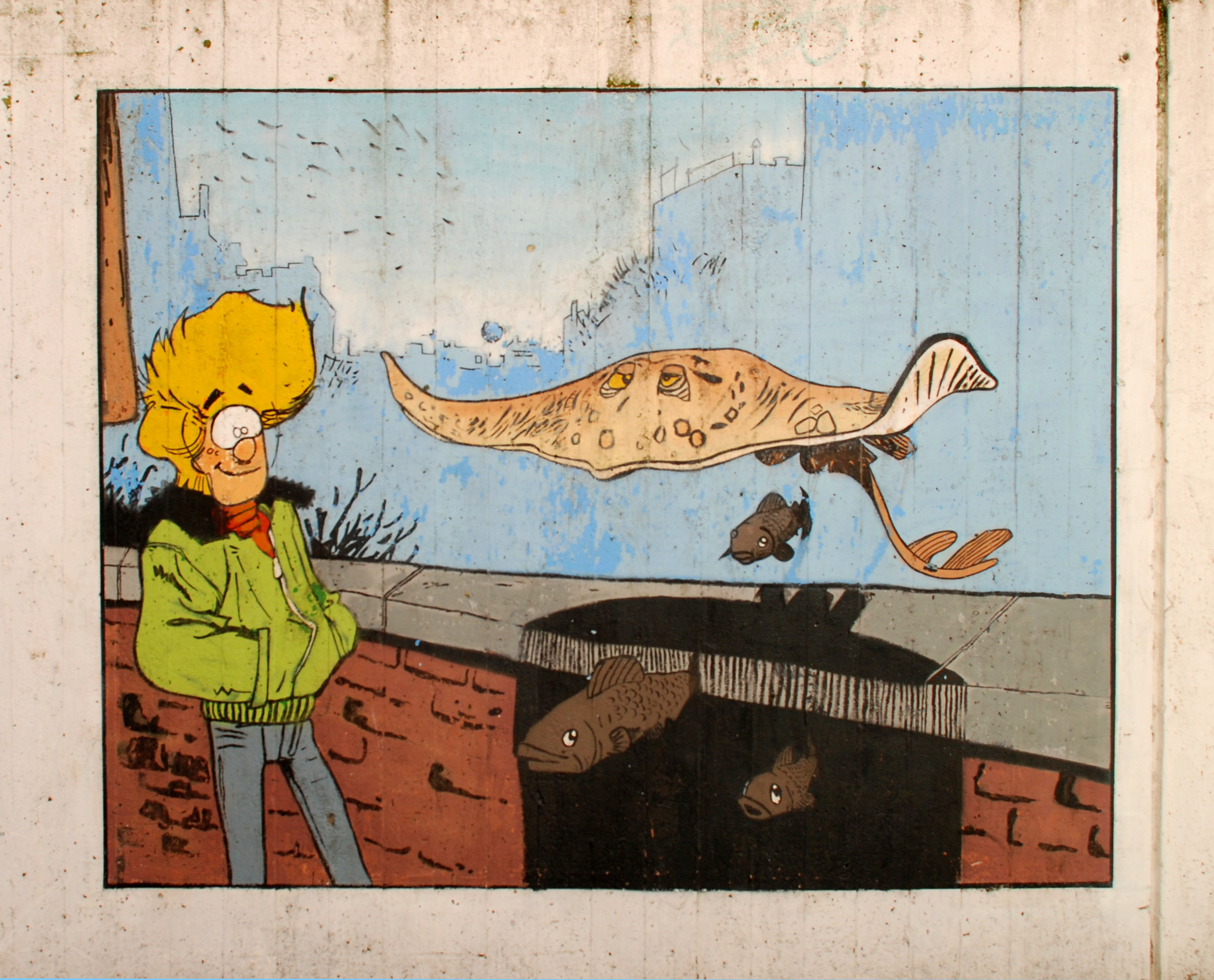
Mural painting « Broussaille » in Louvain-la-Neuve.

- Aymond: Lady S. (2004–2016)
- Batem: Marsupilami (1995–1997, 2013–)
- Bédu: Psy (1992–2019)
- Benn: Mic Mac Adam (1978–1987)
- Berck: Sammy (1970–1994)
- Bercovici: Les Femmes en Blanc (1981–)
- Blesteau: Toupet (1987–2004), Wofi (1976–1987)
- Bom: Broussaille (1983–1989, 2000)
- Raoul Cauvin: Les Tuniques Bleues (1968–2021), Sammy (1970–2009), Cédric (1986–2022), Agent 212 (1975–2022) etc.
- Jean-Michel Charlier: Buck Danny (1947–1978)
- Clarke: Mélusine (1992–2018)
- Stéphane Colman: Billy the Cat (1981–1999)
- Didier Conrad: Les innomables (1980–1982), Donito (1991–1996)
- Luc Cromheecke: Tom Carbone (1985–2011), Plunk ! (2006–2013)
- Darasse: Tamara (2001–), Gang Mazda (1987–1996)
- Lucien De Gieter: Papyrus (1974–2015)
- Arthur De Pins: Zombillénium (2009–)
- Charles Degotte: Flagada (1961–1988), Motards (1984–1993)
- Delaf: The Bellybuttons (2005–2020)
- Paul Deliège: Bobo (1961–1996), Les Krostons (1968–1983)
- Yvan Delporte: Isabelle (1969–1994), The Smurfs (1962–1972)
- Stephen Desberg: Tif et Tondu (1977–1989), Billy the Cat (1982–2004), 421 (1980–1992), Mic Mac Adam (1978–1987)
- Daniel Desorgher: Jimmy Tousseul (1988–2000)
- Jacques Devos: Génial Olivier (1963–1988)
- Fernand Dineur: Tif et Tondu (1938–1951)
- Alain Dodier: Jérôme K. Jérôme Bloche (1982–)
- Dubuc: The Bellybuttons (2005–2020)
- Serge Ernst: Les Zappeurs (1991–2011)
- Benoît Feroumont: Le Royaume (2008–)
- René Follet: Various series (1949–2016)
- Gérald Forton: Kim Devil (1953–1956), Les Belles Histoires de l'oncle Paul (1952–1964)
- Jean-Claude Fournier: Spirou et Fantasio (1969–1979), Bizu (1967–1994), Crannibales (1995–2005, 2011)
- Francis: Marc Lebut (1966–1983)
- Frank: Broussaille (1978–1989, 2000–2002), L'elan (1981–1987)
- André Franquin: Spirou et Fantasio (1946–1969), Gaston Lagaffe (1957–1991)
- Bruno Gazzotti: Soda (1990–2005), Seuls (2006–)
- André Geerts: Jojo (1983–2010)
- François Gilson: Mélusine (1992–2012), Garage Isidore (1991–2012)
- Godard: Toupet (1965–1966, 1987–2004)
- Gos: Scrameustache (1972–2002)
- René Goscinny: Lucky Luke (1955–1967, 1978)
- Bianco Guillaume: Ernest et Rebecca (2010–2021), Zizi chauve–souris (2011–2019), L'Atelier Mastodonte (2011–)
- Marc Hardy: Pierre Tombal (1983–2021)
- René Hausman: Bestiaire (1959–1967), Laïyna (1985–1987)
- Bernard Hislaire: Bidouille et Violette (1978–1985, 2011)
- Victor Hubinon: Buck Danny (1947–1979)
- Gerrit De Jager: Aristote et ses potes (1985–1994)
- Frédéric Jannin: Germain et nous... (1977–1992)
- Janry, Spirou et Fantasio (1981–1998), Le Petit Spirou (1987–), Passe–moi l’ciel (1990–)
- Jidéhem: Gaston Lagaffe (1957–1969), Sophie (1965–1994), Starter (1957–1978)
- Jijé: Spirou et Fantasio (1940–1951), Jerry Spring (1954–1977), Jean Valhardi (1941–1965)
- Joan: Joue avec La Petite Lucie (1994–2020)
- Octave Joly: Les Belles Histoires de l'oncle Paul (1951–1982)
- Daniël Kox: Agent 212 (1975–)
- Lambil: Les Tuniques Bleues (1972–), Pauvre Lampil (1974–2006), Sandy (1959–1974)
- Denis Lapière: Ludo (1997–2009), Oscar (2000–2008)
- Laudec: Cédric (1986–)
- Frank Le Gall: Théodore Poussin (1984–1988, 1997–2004)
- Libon: Animal Lecteur (2006–2018)
- Pic Le Lièvre: Pic et Zou (1998–2018)
- Roger Leloup: Yoko Tsuno (1970–)
- Raymond Macherot: Sibylline (1965–1990)
- Malik: Cupidon (1988–2011), Archie Cash (1971–1987)
- Maltaite: 421 (1980–1992)
- Mazel: Jungles perdues (1975–1987, 2008), Les mousquetaires (1969–1992)
- Midam: Kid Paddle (1993–), Game Over, (2003–)
- Mitacq: La Patrouille des Castors (1954–1993)
- Morris: Lucky Luke (1946–1967, 1978–1985)
- José-Luis Munuera: Spirou et Fantasio (2004-2008), Zorglub (2017-2022), Campbell (2010-2018)
- Nob: Dad, (2014–)
- Eddy Paape: Marc Dacier (1958–1967), Jean Valhardi (1946–1953)
- Peyo: Johan and Peewit (1952–1977), The Smurfs (1959–1988), Benoît Brisefer (1960–1978)
- Arthur Piroton: Jess Long (1969–1995), Michel et Thierry (1962–1968)
- Marcel Remacle: Vieux Nick (1958–1990)
- Jean Roba: Boule et Bill (1959–2006)
- Maurice Rosy: Bobo (1961–1973), Tif et Tondu (1955–1968), Attila (1967–1973)
- Sergio Salma: Animal Lecteur (2006–2018)
- Savoia: Marzi (2004–2017)
- Pierre Seron: Les Petits Hommes (1967–2004)
- Sirius: Timour (1953–1997), L'épervier bleu (1942–1951, 1973–1977)
- Sowa: Marzi (2004–2017)
- Stuf: Passe–moi l’ciel (1990–2015)
- Fabrice Tarrin: Violine (2001–2005), Maki (2008–2011)
- Maurice Tillieux: Gil Jourdan (1956–1978), César (1957–1973), Marc Lebut (1966–1982)
- Tome: Spirou et Fantasio (1981–1998), Le Petit Spirou (1987–2019), Soda (1985–2014)
- Lewis Trondheim: Ralph Azham (2010–2019), Zizi chauve–souris (2011–2019), L'Atelier Mastodonte (2011–)
- Jean Van Hamme: Lady S. (2004–2013), XIII (1984–1986)
- Fabien Vehlmann: Spirou et Fantasio (2006–), Seuls (2006–)
- François Walthéry: Natacha (1970–2007)
- Marc Wasterlain: Docteur Poche (1976–1997, 2011), Jeannette Pointu (1982–2005)
- Weyland: Aria (2002–2015)
- Will: Tif et Tondu (1949–1990), Isabelle (1969–1994)
- Yann: Les innomables (1980–1982), Spirou et Fantasio (2006–2016)
- Yoann: Spirou et Fantasio (2006–)
- Zidrou: Tamara (2001–), Crannibales (1995–2005)

== Format ==
The target audience is between 9 and 16 years, although the magazine appeals to many adults as well. Over the years, Spirou has undergone a few format changes and gradually became thicker, eventually averaging 68 pages. It was distributed in most French and Dutch speaking countries, and for some years, editions in other languages appeared as well (notably in Spain and Portugal).

A few pages, apart from the comics and the advertising, are always put aside for text contents and interaction with the readers (games, letters, jokes, etc.). Often a general theme is used to give the magazine some unity instead of being just a collection of unrelated comics, and this also gets reflected in the layout.

Along with Tintin magazine (founded in 1946), it was considered the home of the Franco-Belgian comics school until the seventies, when its importance declined. Still in publication, Spirou sells some 100,000 copies every week (as of 2009). Robbedoes was eventually shelved in September 2005, after more than 3500 weekly publications.

== Title ==
- On 21 April 1938, the magazine was created under the name Le journal de Spirou.
- On 1 May 1947, it was renamed Spirou.
- On 5 October 1988, it was renamed Spirou Magaziiiine
- On 12 January 1994, it was once again named Spirou.
- On 25 January 2006, it became Spirou HeBDo.
- On 16 April 2008, it again became Spirou.

== Sources ==
- Dossier and issue index of Spirou BDoubliées (in French)
