= Derib =

Swiss francophone comics creator

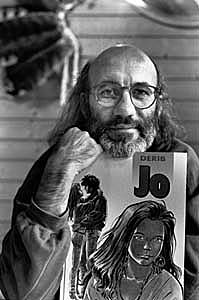
- Born: Claude de Ribaupierre; 8 August 1944 (age 82) La Tour-de-Peilz, Switzerland

Derib (born Claude de Ribaupierre on 8 August 1944 in La Tour-de-Peilz, Switzerland) is a Swiss francophone comics creator. He is best known for creating the comics Les Aventures d'Attila, Buddy Longway and Yakari.

== Awards ==
- 1974: Best Comic at the Prix Saint-Michel, Belgium
- 1978: Best Foreign Artist at the Angoulême International Comics Festival, France
- 1982: Youth Award (9-12 years) at the Angoulême International Comics Festival
- 1994: nominated for Best German-language Comic/Comic-related Publication at the Max & Moritz Prizes, Germany
- 2005: nominated for the Best Series Award at the Angoulême International Comics Festival
- 2006: Youth Award (7-8 years) at the Angoulême International Comics Festival

== Sources ==
- Derib publications in Spirou, Pilote, Belgian Tintin, French Tintin BDoubliées (in French)
- BDParadisio.com (in French)
- Bedetheque.com (in French)
