= Fernand Dineur =

Belgian cartoonist

- Born: 17 April 1904 Anderlecht, Belgium
- Died: 1 April 1956 (aged 51)
- Areas: Writer, Artist
- Notable works: Tif et Tondu

Tif and Tondu by Fernand Dineur.

Fernand Dineur (Anderlecht, Belgium, May 17, 1904–1 April 1956) was a Belgian comics artist, famous for creating "Tif et Tondu". The series was published in Spirou from the very first issue, 1938.
