= Yvan Delporte =

Belgian comics writer

- Delporte in 2004
- Born: 24 June 1928 Brussels, Belgium
- Died: 5 March 2007 (aged 78) Brussels, Belgium
- Areas: Writer, editor
- Notable works: Gaston Lagaffe; Idées noires The Smurfs; Isabelle

Yvan Delporte (24 June 1928 – 5 March 2007) was a Belgian comics writer, and was editor-in-chief of Spirou magazine between 1955 and 1968 during a period considered by many the golden age of Franco-Belgian comics. He is credited with several creative contributions, among these his collaborations with Peyo on The Smurfs, with René Follet on Steve Severin (1/2) and André Franquin with the creation of Gaston Lagaffe and the co-authorship of Franquin's satirical comic Idées noires.

== Biography ==
Delporte started at Spirou at the age of 17. Where his first job was to retouch the cleavage in American comics which at the time were considered excessively lewd. He handled other odd jobs, and over time touched upon a great deal of different occupations within the comics industry. In 1955, upon becoming editor-in-chief of Spirou in place of Charles Dupuis, a long-lasting collaboration with Franquin began, which would spawn many creations. Delporte was also active as a translator of foreign comics.
