= Brussels' Comic Book Route =

Comic strip path in Brussels, Belgium

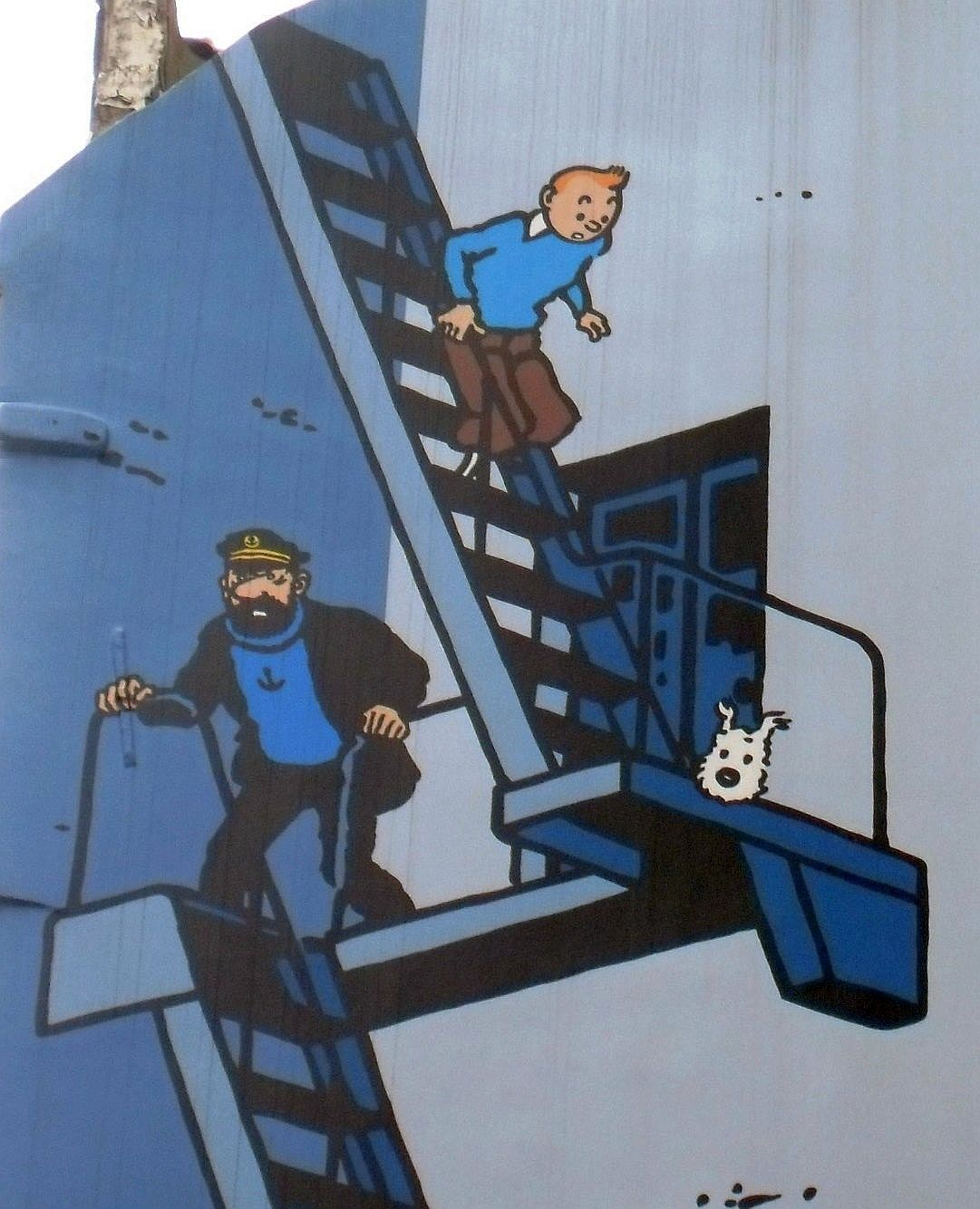
Comic mural in the Rue de l'Étuve / Stoofstraat depicting a scene from The Calculus Affair, featuring Tintin, Captain Haddock and Snowy

Brussels' Comic Book Route (French: Parcours BD de Bruxelles; Dutch: Striproute van Brussel) is a path composed by several comic strip murals, which cover the walls of several buildings throughout the inner City of Brussels, as well as the neighbourhoods of Laeken and Auderghem. The large comic strip murals depict scenes from various popular Belgian comics, for instance The Adventures of Tintin, The Smurfs, Lucky Luke, Gaston, and Marsupilami.

== History ==
The project began in 1991 as an initiative of the local authorities of the City of Brussels in collaboration with the Belgian Comic Strip Center. Initially, the project only intended to embellish empty walls and gables of buildings in the city. It then became an opportunity to celebrate the rich comic book heritage of Brussels, which claims to be the capital of the comic strip.

Nowadays, the Brussels' Comic Book Route offers more than 50 mural paintings, most of them located inside the Pentagon (as the city centre is often called due to its geometrical shape). Following its trail, the Comic Book Route is a good way to discover the capital and even penetrate some neighbourhoods less crowded by tourists. The Brussels tourist association Pro Velo organises a two-hour bike tour starting at the Bicycle Riders House (Maison des cyclistes).

Broussaille was the first comic book wall to be painted, based on an original project of the comic book artist Frank Pé. With its surface of about 35 m^{2} (380 sq ft), the mural painting was inaugurated in July 1991 at the intersection of the Rue du Marché au Charbon/Kolenmarkt and the Rue des Teinturiers/Verversstraat. As with most of the mural paintings, the association Art Mural was in charge of the execution of the work.

Art Mural is an association created by five artists in 1984, mainly aimed to realise mural painting in public areas. Since 1993, it has been devoted to the creation and realisation of new murals for Brussels' Comic Book Route, with a rhythm of two to three new works per year. Georgios Oreopoulos and David Vandegeerde are the only two remaining founder members of the association, having been involved in all the projects and murals, helped with a large number of other artists who have collaborated and worked with them.

== List of comic strip mural paintings ==
=== In central Brussels ===
No.	Mural painting	Author	Date	Realisation	Location	Surface
1	Victor Sackville	Francis Carin	August 2002	Oreopoulos G. Vandegeerde D.	Rue du Marché au Charbon / Rue des Teinturiers (Kolenmarkt / Verversstraat)	± 50 m^{2}
2	Broussaille	Frank Pé	September 1999	Mangnay J.-Y. Oreopoulos G. Pieterhons R. Vandegeerde D.	Rue du Marché au Charbon 39 / Rue des Teinturiers (Kolenmarkt / Verversstraat)	± 45 m^{2}
3	Le Passage	François Schuiten	July 1995	Oreopoulos G. Vandegeerde D.	Rue du Marché au Charbon 17 (Kolenmarkt 17)	±20 m^{2}
4	Ric Hochet	Tibet	November 1994	Oreopoulos G. Vandegeerde D.	Rue du Bon Secours 9 (Bijstandsstraat 9)	±30 m^{2}
5	The Adventures of Tintin	Hergé	July 2005	Oreopoulos G. Vandegeerde D.	Rue de l'Étuve 33 (Stoofstraat 33)	± 36 m^{2}
6	Olivier Rameau	Dany	June 1997	Oreopoulos G. Vandegeerde D.	Rue du Chêne 9 (Eikstraat 9)	±60 m^{2}
7	Le jeune Albert	Yves Chaland	May 2000	Mangnay J.-Y. Oreopoulos G. Pieterhons R. Vandegeerde D.	Rue des Alexiens 49 (Cellebroerstraat 49)	± 110 m^{2}
8	Monsieur Jean	Dupuy and Berberian	November 2002	Oreopoulos G. Vandegeerde D.	Rue des Bogards / Rue du Midi (Bogardenstr. / Zuidstraat)	± 64 m^{2}
9	XIII	William Vance; Jean Van Hamme	September–October 2010	Oreopoulos G. Vandegeerde D. Kuleczko R.	Rue Philippe de Champagne 33 (Philippe de Champagne straat 33)	± 43 m^{2}
10	Yoko Tsuno	Roger Leloup	June 2010	Oreopoulos G. Vandegeerde D. Ardila A. Kuleczko R. Dussart G.	Rue Terre-Neuve 15 (Nieuwland 15)	± 55 m^{2}
11	Isabelle	Will	October 1997	Oreopoulos G. Vandegeerde D.	Rue de la Verdure 13 (Loofstraat 13)	±86 m^{2}
12	The Adventures of Nero	Marc Sleen	May 1995	Oreopoulos G. Vandegeerde D.	Place Saint-Géry 20 (Sint Gorikplein)	±40 m^{2}
13	L'Ange	Yslaire	May 1998	Oreopoulos G. Vandegeerde D.	Rue des Chartreux 19 (Kartuizersstraat 19)	± 22 m^{2}
14	Astérix	Goscinny and Uderzo	August 2005	Oreopoulos G. Vandegeerde D. Marcelle Bordier; Koen Weiss	Rue de la Buanderie 15 (Washuisstraat 15)	± 145 m^{2}
15	Lucky Luke	Morris	June 1993	Oreopoulos G. Vandegeerde D.	Rue de la Buanderie / Rue 't Kindt	±180 m^{2}
16	Cori, de Scheepsjongen ("Cori, the Cabin Boy")	Bob de Moor	September 1998	Oreopoulos G. Vandegeerde D.	Rue des Fabriques 21 (Fabriekstraat 21)	± 48 m^{2}
17	Les rêves de Nic	Hermann Huppen	October 1999	Mangnay J.-Y. Oreopoulos G. Pieterhons R. Vandegeerde D.	Rue des Fabriques / Rue de la Senne (Fabrikstraat / Zennestraat)	± 160 m^{2}
18	Caroline Baldwin	André Taymans and Bruno Wesel	July 2003	Oreopoulos G. Vandegeerde D.	Place de Ninove 10	±150 m^{2}
19	Blake and Mortimer	Edgar P. Jacobs	May–June 2005	Oreopoulos G. Vandegeerde D.	Rue du Houblon 24 (Hopstraat 24)	±104 m^{2}
20	Cubitus	Dupa	October 1994	Oreopoulos G. Vandegeerde D.	Rue de Flandre 109 (Vlaamsesteeenweg 109)	±35 m^{2}
21	Billy the Cat	Stéphane Colman and Stephen Desberg	July 2000	Mangnay J.-Y. Oreopoulos G. Pieterhons R. Vandegeerde D.	Rue d'Ophem 24 (Oppemstraa 24)	± 50 m^{2}
22	Spike and Suzy	Willy Vandersteen	June 1995	Oreopoulos G. Vandegeerde D.	Rue de Laeken 116 (Lakensestraat 116)	±25 m^{2}
23	FC de Kampioenen	Hec Leemans	April 2011	ART MURAL asbl. Oreopoulos G. Vandegeerde D. Ardila A. Kuleczko R. Dussart G.	Rue du Canal 27 (Vaartstraat 27)	±90 m^{2}
24	Corto Maltese	Hugo Pratt	August–September 2009	Oreopoulos G. Vandegeerde D. Ardila A. Kuleczko R. Dussart G.	Quai des péniches (Akenkaai)	± 850 m^{2}
25	La Vache ("The Cow")	Johan De Moor	March–April 1999	d'Hainaut E. Oreopoulos G. Vandegeerde D.	Rue du Damier 23 (Damstraat 23)	32 m^{2}
26	Gaston statue	André Franquin	February 1996	Delhaize Le Lion	Boulevard Pachéco / Rue des Sables (Pachécolaan / Zandstraat)	
27	Le Scorpion	Enrico Marini	May 2002	Oreopoulos G. Vandegeerde D.	Rue du Treurenberg 16 (Treurenbergstraat 16)	± 35 m^{2}
28	Poje	Cauvin and Carpentier	Unknown	Oreopoulos G. Vandegeerde D.	Rue de l'Ecuyer 55 / Rue de dominicains (Schildknaapstraat 55 / Predikherenstraat)	Inconnu
29	Gaston	André Franquin	February 2007	Oreopoulos G. Vandegeerde D.	Rue de l'Écuyer 9 (Schildknaapstraat 9)	± 39 m^{2}
30	Quick & Flupke	Hergé	July 1996	Oreopoulos G. Vandegeerde D.	Rue des Capucins / Rue Haute 191 (Kapucijnenstr. / Hoogstraat 191)	±150 m^{2}
31	Odilon Verjus	Laurent Verron and Yann le Pennetier	June 2004	Oreopoulos G. Vandegeerde D.	Rue des Capucins 13 (Kapucijnenstraat 13)	± 33 m^{2}
32	Blondin et Cirage	Jijé	November 1998	Oreopoulos G. Vandegeerde D.	Rue des Capucins 15 (Kapucijnenstraat 13)	± 32 m^{2}
33	Passe-moi l'ciel	Stuf and Janry	July 2002	Oreopoulos G. Vandegeerde D.	Rue des Minimes 96 (Minimenstraat 96)	± 28 m^{2}
34	Boule et Bill	Jean Roba	October 1995	Oreopoulos G. Vandegeerde D.	Rue du Chevreuil 19 (Reebokstraat 19)	25 m^{2}
35	La Patrouille des Castors	Mitacq	April 2003	Oreopoulos G. Vandegeerde D.	Rue Blaes 200 / Rue Pieremans 47 (Blaesstraat 200 / Pieremansstraat 47)	± 50 m^{2}
36	Jojo	André Geerts	September 1996	Oreopoulos G. Vandegeerde D.	Rue Piermans 41 (Pieremansstraat 41)	±56 m^{2}
37	Le Chat	Philippe Geluck	August 1993	Oreopoulos G. Vandegeerde D.	Bld du Midi 87 (Zuidlaan 87)	±80 m^{2}
38	Heads of Tintin and Snowy	Hergé	Unknown	Lombard Editions	Avenue Paul-Henri Spaak 7 (Paul-Henri Spaaklaan 7)	-
39	Tintin in America	Hergé	January 2007	-	Hall of Brussels-South railway station	Unknown
40	Signor Spaghetti	Dino Attanasio	Unknown	Unknown	Rue van Bergen 22 (Van Bergenstraat)	Unknown
41	Yakari	Derib and Job	Unknown	Unknown	Rue Dethy 25 (Dethystraat)	Unknown
42	Spirou	Robert Velter	Unknown	Unknown	Place Sainctelette, 2 (Saincteletteplein)	Unknown
43	Thorgal & Aaricia	Jean Van Hamme and Grzegorz Rosiński	November 2013	Grzegorz Rosinski	Place Anneessens 2a	Unknown
44	Stam & Pilou	De Marck and De Wulf	May 2011	-	Rue des Alexiens 53-55 (Cellebroersstraat 53-55); Inside the pub Het Goudblommeke in Papier	21 m^{2}

=== In Laeken/Laken ===
N°	Mural painting	Author	Date	Realisation	Location	Surface
1	Titeuf	Zep	September 2006	Oreopoulos G. Vandegeerde D. Weiss K. Ardila A.	Avenue Emile Bockstael 1 (Emile Bockstaellaan 1)	± 160 m^{2}
2	Gil Jourdan	Maurice Tillieux	May 2009	Oreopoulos G. Vandegeerde D. Ardila A. Kuleczko R.	Rue Léopold 1er / Rue Thys-Vanhamstraat (Léopold I Straat / Thys-Vanhamstraat)	± 77 m^{2}
3	Natacha	François Walthéry	October 2009	Oreopoulos G. Vandegeerde D. Ardila A. Kuleczko R. Dussart G.	Rue Jan Bollen 23 (Jan Bollenstraat 23)	± 200 m^{2}
4	Martine	Marcel Marlier and Gilbert Delahaye	October 2004	Oreopoulos G. Vandegeerde D.	Avenue de la Reine 325 / Rue Stéphanie (Koninginnelaan 325 / Stefaniastraat)	± 180 m^{2}
5	Le Roi des mouches	Mezzo	June 2007	Oreopoulos G. Vandegeerde D. Pieterhons R.	Rue Hubert Stiernet 23 (Hubert Stiernetstraat 23)	± 96 m^{2}
6	Lincoln	Olivier Jouvray and Jérôme Jouvray	May 2006	Oreopoulos G. Vandegeerde D.	Rue des Palais outre-pont / Rue Arthur Cosyn (Paleizenstraat over de bruggen / Arthur Cosyn straat)	± 120 m^{2}
7	Kiekeboe	Merho	April 2009	Oreopoulos G. Vandegeerde D. Ardila A. Kuleczko R.	Av. du Gros Tilleul / Av. de Madrid (Madridlaan / Dikkelindelaan)	± 81 m^{2}
8	Petit Spirou	Tome and Janry	May 1996	Oreopoulos G. Vandegeerde D.	Boulevard du Centenaire / Place de Bruparck (Eeuwfeestlaan / Bruparckplein)	±50 m^{2}

=== In Auderghem/Oudergem ===
N°	Mural painting	Author	Date	Realisation	Location	Surface
1	Gil Jourdan	Maurice Tillieux	Unknown	Unknown	Rue du Vieux Moulin (Oudemolenstraat)	Unknown
2	Gil Jourdan	Maurice Tillieux	Unknown	Unknown	Rue Emile Idiers (Emile Idiersstraat)	Unknown
3	Le Scrameustache	Gos and Walt	November 2008	Unknown	Chaussée de Wavre 1314 (Waversesteenweg 1314)	± 50 m^{2}

== See also ==
- Culture of Belgium

== Bibliography ==
- La BD dans la ville. Author: Thibaut Vandorselaer (in French)
- Bruxelles dans la BD, itinéraire découverte, 2004 Versant Sud, B-1348 Lovain-la-Neuve. Author: Thibaut Vandorselaer (in French)
