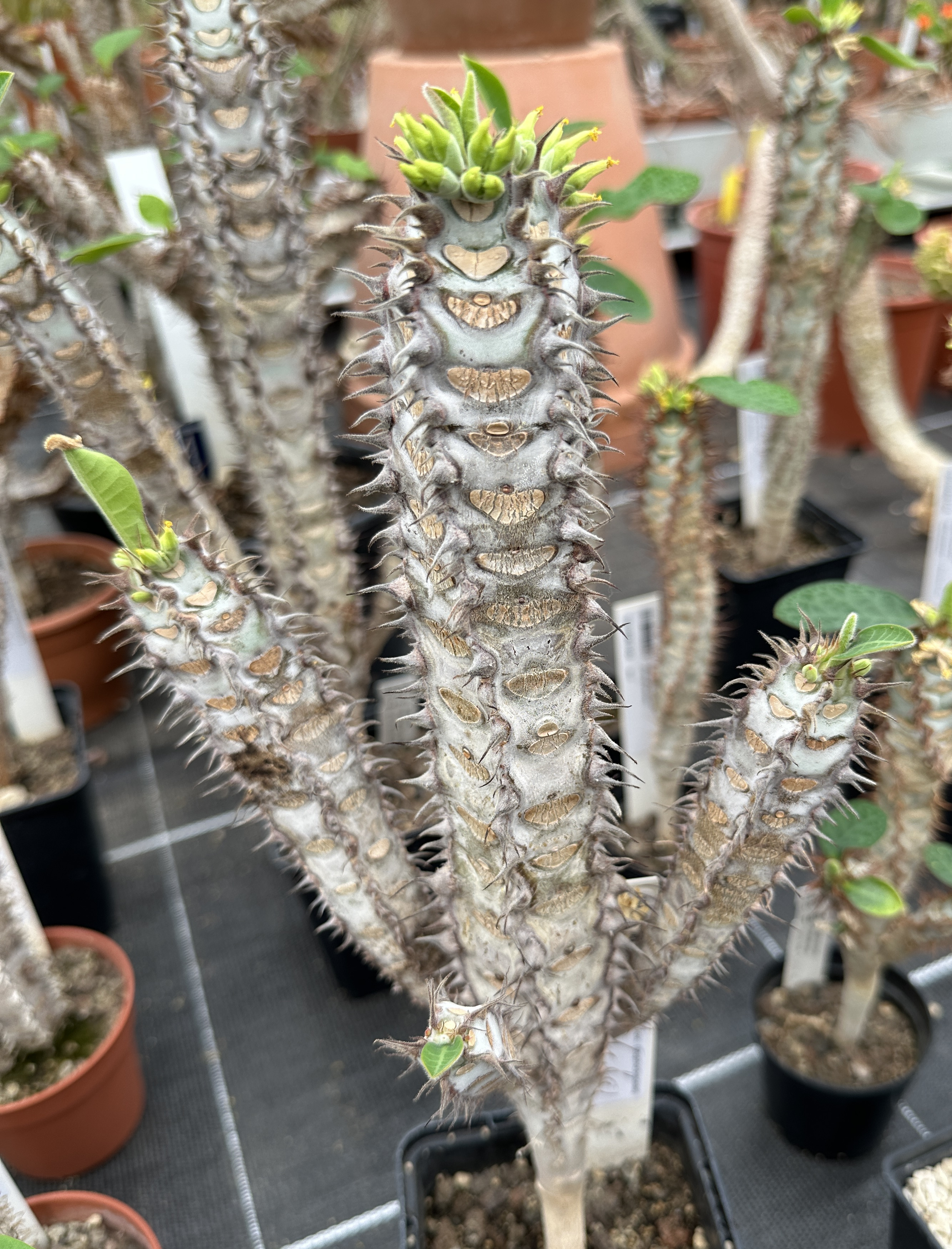

Conservation status
- Data Deficient (IUCN 3.1)

Scientific classification
- Kingdom: Plantae
- Clade: Tracheophytes
- Clade: Angiosperms
- Clade: Eudicots
- Clade: Rosids
- Order: Malpighiales
- Family: Euphorbiaceae
- Genus: Euphorbia
- Species: E. caput-aureum

Binomial name
- Euphorbia caput-aureum Denis

= Euphorbia caput-aureum =

Species of flowering plant

Euphorbia caput-aureum is a species of plant in the family Euphorbiaceae. It is endemic to Madagascar. Its natural habitat is rocky areas.
