= La Ribambelle =

Belgian comic series

- Main characters with the series logo
- Author(s): André Franquin, Marcel Denis, Jean Roba, Vicq, Yvan Delporte, Maurice Tillieux, Zidrou
- Illustrator(s): Jo-El Azara, Jean Roba, Jidéhem, Jean-Marc Krings
- Current status/schedule: Discontinued
- Launch date: 1958
- End date: 2012
- Publisher(s): Dupuis, Le Lombard
- Genre: Adventure

La Ribambelle (French for "flock" or "throng") is a Belgian comics series about a gang of kids living in the same neighbourhood. There were two versions of this strip: Joseph Loeckx (better known under the pen-name of "Jo-El Azara") drew a one-off story in 1958, but the longer-lasting version was that of Jean Roba (best known for Boule et Bill) who created a whole new set of characters who came from various countries and ethnic backgrounds but lived in the same city. They played in a local yard and even had adventures abroad. Others who contributed to the strip included writers Vicq, Maurice Tillieux and artist Jidéhem.

Roba's version was published in Spirou magazine between 1962 and 1975 and in book form.

== Publication history ==
=== Inspirations ===
In the 1920s, the Sunday pages of American artist Martin Branner's Winnie Winkle the Breadwinner focused on the adventures of her little brother Perry and his gang the Rinkydinks, which included a Chinese boy called Chink. Their stories proved very popular in Europe. Perry was renamed Bicot for the French market and European artists made new comics about him and the Rinkydinks when Branner's weekly pages were no longer sufficient. The Our Gang films were also popular and featured African-American kids as well as whites. Among the Belgian children who enjoyed these series were André Franquin and Jean Roba.

=== Early version ===
By 1957 Franquin was a leading artist and contributor to Belgian comics. Artist Joseph Loeckx asked him for advice on a series that could get him work at Spirou magazine. Franquin suggested a gang of kids similar to Branner's Rinkydinks, coming up with the name "Ribambelle" (French for "flock" or "throng"), which "sounded right". A lover of jazz, Franquin also suggested that Loeckx include a black boy trumpeter called Dizzi, named after Dizzy Gillespie.

The first version of the Ribambelle assemble outside their gang hut

Based on a script by Marcel Denis, Loeckx, under the pen-name Joël, drew a four-page strip called Opération ciseaux (French for "Operation Scissors"). The gang's HQ was an old shack in a neighbourhood yard. Most of them appeared to be in their teens and included Tony, the blond-haired leader; Filasse, the artist; Michette, the fiery and heavy-handed only girl; Michel, the slingshot champion; Dizzi, the musician; and a much younger boy whose name was not mentioned.

Published in issue 1041 of Spirou magazine in March 1958, it was drawn in a ligne claire style more usually associated with the rival Tintin magazine; Loeckx having been influenced early in his career by Tintin contributor Willy Vandersteen. Soon afterwards, Loeckx joined the staff of Tintin, where he became best known under the pen-name Jo-El Azara, and the strip, after just one story, became dormant.

=== Roba version ===
A few years later, at Franquin's suggestion, artist Jean Roba started his own series called La Ribambelle but changed most of the characters, giving them varied nationalities and racial backgrounds, the only connection to Loeckx's original being Dizzi. The thorns in their sides were the Caïmans, a trio of rough boys described as "more stupid than nasty".

Their first adventure, La Ribambelle gagne du terrain (French for "The Ribambelle Gains Ground"), started publication in Spirou magazine issue 1247 in early March 1962 and was published in book form in 1965. Several adventures were published in this way until 1975 when Roba dropped the strip and stuck to his more popular Boule et Bill series. The stories have occasionally been republished in Spirou and omnibus editions of their adventures came out in 2004.

A new adventure of the Ribambelle was published in 2011, written by Zidrou (pen-name of Benoît Drousie), best known for L'Élève Ducobu, and drawn by Jean-Marc Krings.

== Characters ==
...And Phil gets through Atchi and Atcha with the ball, and it's a brilliant header by Dizzy, but a save by keeper Archibald. And referee Grenadine calls "Offside!"

=== The Ribambelle ===
The Ribambelle is a gang of friendly kids who attend the same school in a typical mainland European town, probably in France. They hang out in a local yard, their HQ being a battered, abandoned bus. To ensure their privacy, a variety of hidden traps have been laid around the ground to discourage intruders.

Phil: the leader of the group, blond-haired and very supportive of his friends.

Dizzy: a keen trumpeter and jazz fan. His father is part of an orchestra.

Archibald MacDingelling: a Scot from a wealthy family, who lives in a large house with his butler James. He wears glasses and a school uniform, and often a kilt. He can be a bit of a know-all, but the others like him anyway. Technically minded, it was he who installed the traps in the yard but they are so well hidden that even he forgets where they are. Archibald is easily offended, especially when called an Englishman. His father works abroad but sends him letters: white sheets of paper for good news and black sheets for bad, thus saving on ink.

Grenadine: the only girl member, she is of a practical nature, often darning the boys' socks and other clothes torn during play. She also has a first aid box on standby during fights with the Caïmans, though it is usually they rather than her friends who require aspirin and bandages. When the boys divide into groups as part of their games, she usually serves as arbiter. Grenadine is a French soft-drink, popular among young children.

Atchi and Atcha: twin Japanese boys who dress alike and often talk in unison, using lengthy monologues and Japanese "quotations" to describe their observations. They are Judo champions, something that the Caïmans, and even bigger opponents, have learned at their expense.

James Jollygoodfellow: the MacDingelling butler. He looks after Archibald and they are very close. James is himself a Scot and is the epitome of the stiff-upper lip manservant, often putting on airs but remaining friendly and good-humoured and well liked by the children. He escorts them on their journeys abroad, making him almost a de facto member.

=== The Caïmans ===
A trio of local bullies who try to impose themselves on the neighbourhood. They hang out in a garage and wear leather jackets with pictures on the back of the animal they call themselves after. Tatane is the leader (despite being the smallest) and likes to refer to himself as such. The others, Rodolphe and Alphonse, are in awe of him, even when his plans go disastrously wrong, and he addresses them as "mes p'tit gars" ("me little laddies"), even though he is half their size. Tatane has one aim in life: to get the "Ribabies... under my boot".

The Caïmans are often in league with Grofilou (French for "Bigrascal"), a crooked businessman. Grofilou is feared by most of the town — but not by the Ribambelle, who stand up to him and his rotten ways.

== Stories ==
The adventures of the Ribambelle have not been published in English. Below is a list of the French titles, their year of publication, an English translation of the titles and a brief description. They are listed in order of publication.

French title	Date of publication	English translation	Writer	Artist	Summary
Opération ciseaux	1958	[Operation Scissors]	Marcel Denis	Jo–ël	A gang of kids helps an elderly grindstone operator to face up to a younger and unpleasant competitor.
La Ribambelle gagne du terrain	1962	[The Ribambelle Gains Ground]	Jean Roba	Jean Roba	When they learn that the yard they use as a playground is to be sold, the Ribambelle set about trying to get the money to buy it themselves, with advice from a mysterious tramp who has moved into their HQ. But a shady businessman, Grofilou, is also after the ground and employs the Caïmans to deal with the competition.
La Ribambelle en Ecosse	1962	[The Ribambelle in Scotland]	Jean Roba	Jean Roba	When the Golden Thistle, his family's emblem, is stolen by a rival clan, Archibald is summoned to Scotland by his Uncle Angus to recover it and takes his friends with him. But they soon discover that resolving a centuries-old feud is somewhat easier said than done.
La Ribambelle s’envole	1962	[The Ribambelle Takes Off]	Jean Roba	Jean Roba	There is to be a competition in which the aim is to build a plane which is powered by its pilot. With great excitement, Archibald gets down to the design — even if Dizzy is not too keen on being the flyer. But the Caïmans are also out to build a plane, with no regard for rules or fair play.
La Ribambelle engage du monde	1964	[The Ribambelle Recruits]	Jean Roba	Jean Roba	Having failed to take over the Ribambelle's yard due to the traps, the Caïmans decide on a new strategy: "If you can't beat 'em, join 'em — then beat 'em". But they've not counted on the Ribambelle's membership tests.
La Ribambelle au bassin	1964	[The Ribambelle at the Pond]	Jean Roba	Jean Roba	While pursued by police through the park, a man throws something into the pond. This inspires the curiosity of the Ribambelle, but also the Caïmans.
La Ribambelle aux Galopingos	1966	[The Ribambelle at the Galopingos Islands]	Vicq	Jean Roba	Having won a competition to the Galopingos Islands in the Caribbean, the gang discovers that it is only for one person and thus give it to their friend Mister Berlingaud, sweet shop owner and amateur scientist who has never so much as seen the sea. But then Mister Berlingaud mysteriously disappears and so they hurry off to find him. However, an island which includes hostile natives and dragons is not the ideal place for a search. (In this story, published almost 20 years after World War II, the antagonists are mainly ex-pat Germans, including a mad scientist — a possible reference to Nazi exiles like Doctor Josef Mengele and Klaus Barbie who escaped to South America to avoid prosecution for crimes against humanity.)
La Ribambelle enquête	1968	[The Ribambelle Investigates]	Maurice Tillieux	Jean Roba	A dealer in second-hand goods tries to discreetly break into the Ribambelle's yard only to fall foul of the traps and is forced to retreat. So when Archibald appears in his shop in order to buy a present for James, the dealer does not hesitate to lock him into a storehouse in order to get the details of the traps' locations. But he's counted without the concern and loyalty of Archibald's friends and the devoted James.
La Ribambelle contre–attaque	1975	[The Ribambelle Strikes Back]	Maurice Tillieux	Jean Roba, Jidéhem	The gang's old enemy, Grofilou, has discovered the reason for Archibald's recent abduction and intends to put it to his own advantage with the help of the Caïmans. This however is the least of the worries of the re-united Ribambelle, especially after Dizzy's quip about Scottish cuisine.
La Ribambelle reprend du service	2011	[The Ribambelle Gets Back to Business]	Zidrou	Jean-Marc Krings	Upon their return from the holidays, the Ribambelle find their old bus in a terrible state and decide that it will have to be disposed of — but James overhears them and gets the wrong idea. Meanwhile, Tatame unleashes his ultimate weapon against the gang: his sister.
La Ribambelle reprend au Japon	2012	[The Ribambelle in Japan]	Zidrou	Jean-Marc Krings	

== See also ==
• Marcinelle school

• Belgian comics

• Franco-Belgian comics
