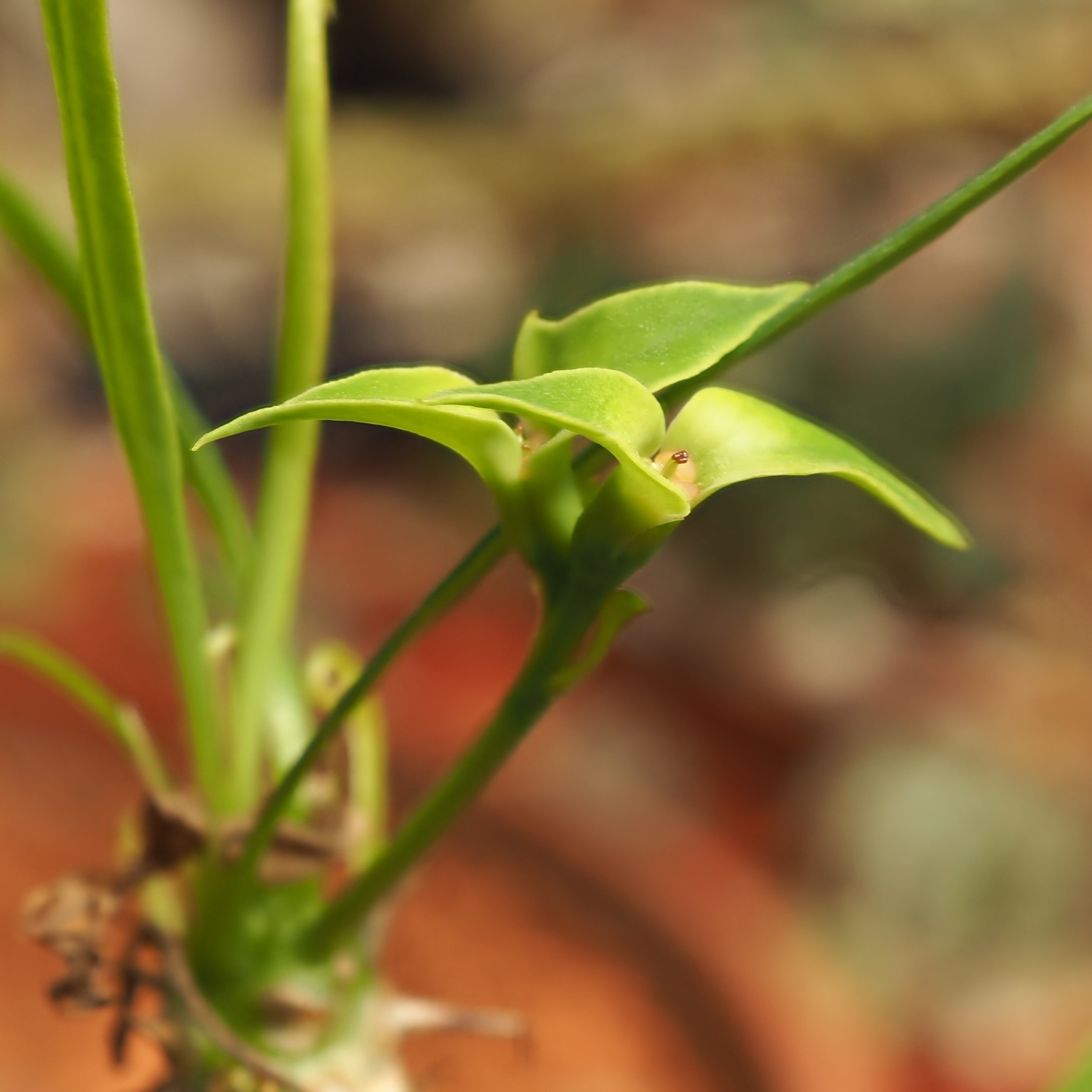

Conservation status
- Endangered (IUCN 3.1)

Scientific classification
- Kingdom: Plantae
- Clade: Tracheophytes
- Clade: Angiosperms
- Clade: Eudicots
- Clade: Rosids
- Order: Malpighiales
- Family: Euphorbiaceae
- Genus: Euphorbia
- Species: E. brachyphylla

Binomial name
- Euphorbia brachyphylla Denis

= Euphorbia brachyphylla =

Species of flowering plant

Euphorbia brachyphylla is a species of plant in the family Euphorbiaceae. It is endemic to Madagascar. Its natural habitat is known to be primarily rocky areas. The main threat to this species is habitat loss.
