= César (comics) =

Belgian comic strip series

- Cover to album 2, La Vie à Deux (1971)
- Author: Maurice Tillieux
- Launch date: Spirou no. 1004, July 11, 1957
- Alternate name: César et Ernestine
- Publisher: Dupuis
- Genre: Humor
- Original language: French

César, or César and Ernestine, is a Belgian comic strip series by author Maurice Tillieux.

It features a cartoonist, César, who has to cope with everyday problems, and Ernestine, his neighbor's daughter, whom he has to look after. He must also put up with his cleaning lady, Églantine, and his neighbor, police officer Petitcarné.

The series, first published in Spirou between 1957 and 1959, was then transferred to Le Moustique between 1959 and 1966 before the gags appearing in Le Moustique were republished in Spirou and its Dutch-language edition Robbedoes from 1969 to 1973. In parallel, the series was published in four paperback editions, then reissued as a complete series in the 1980s and 90s, as well as in November 2011.

== Synopsis ==
The series follows the daily life of César, a single cartoonist. He'd like to lead a quiet life, but unfortunately for him, he has to put up with Ernestine, his neighbor's daughter, whom he has to look after, the police officer Petitcarné, neighbor and Ernestine's father, who gives him tickets for nothing, and the impossible-to-live-with cleaning lady Églantine.

== History ==
The series was first published in Spirou between 1957 and 1959. Caesar's first appearance was in Spirou No. 1004, July 11, 1957, in a two-page story called Petit divertissement en chambre. This first appearance was a rough sketch of the character. He has black hair but already owns an old car.

Ernest returns in Spirou no. 1042 (April 3, 1958) for a special spring issue in which the police officer Petitcarné, disrupts César's spring cleaning. A third story appeared in Spirou's special issue no. 1055 of July 7, 1958, for the 1958 Brussels World's Fair, in which César and Ernest participate in a model-building competition. A fourth and final story appeared in Spirou no. 1107, July 2, 1959. César's appearance has changed, he wears glasses and his hair has thinned.

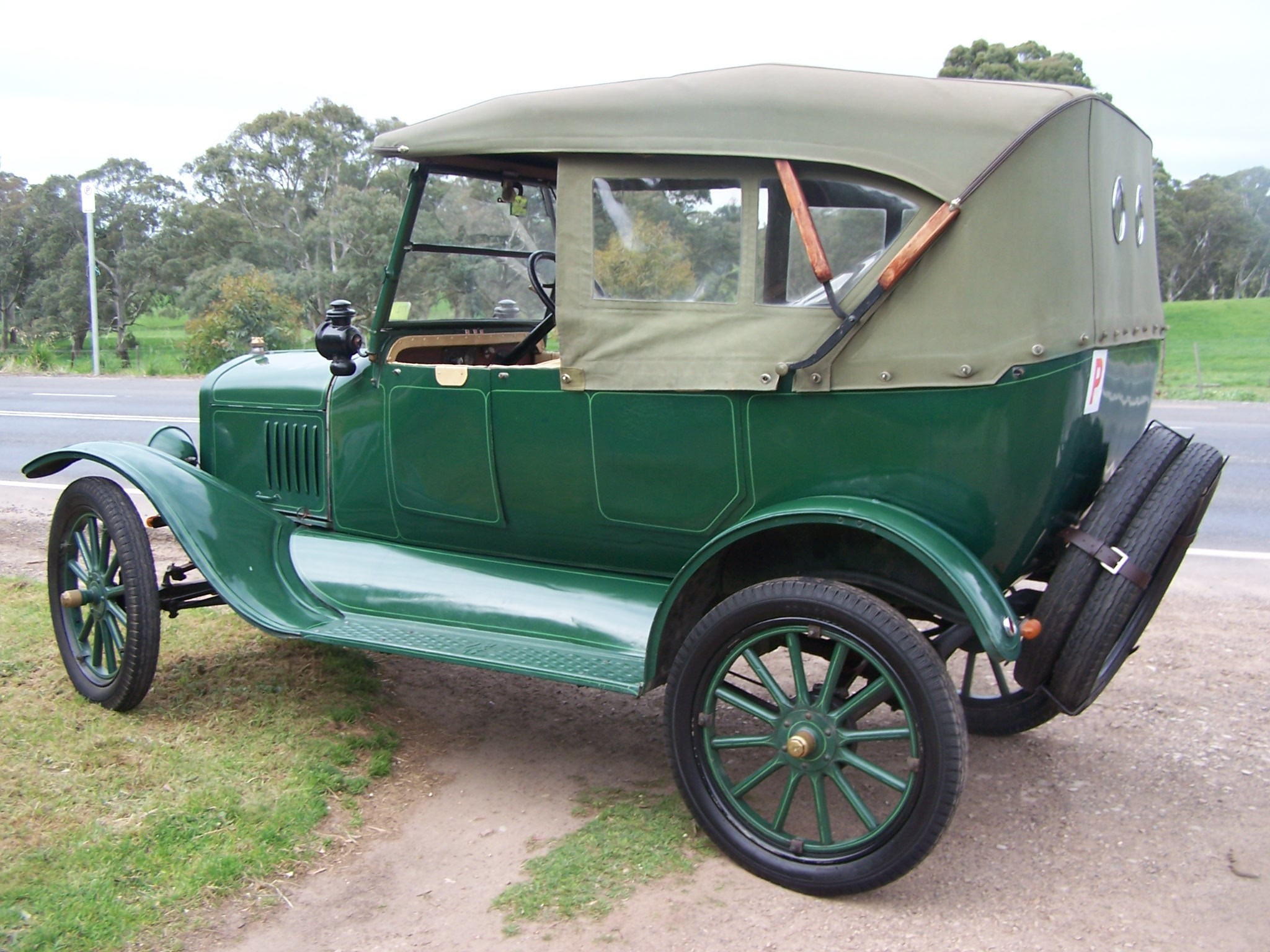
Photo of a Ford T, the car that inspired Caesar's car (which is yellow in the comic strip).

The series was then published in Le Moustique between 1959 and 1966. César left Spirou to join Le Moustique on December 31, 1959. Le Moustique is published by Dupuis, which also publishes Spirou. For a long time, it functioned as a learning class for Spirou's young authors, but by the end of the 1950s, it was mainly British series such as Judd Saxon and Caroline that were published there. Charles Dupuis wanted the magazine to have its hero, so he asked Maurice Tillieux - who had been drawing Gil Jourdan in Spirou since 1956 - to provide one. Maurice Tillieux brought out his character César, created three years earlier in Spirou for four short stories, and modified him slightly by replacing young Ernest with his sister Ernestine. In Le Moustique, the series was published on a half-page, but the layout of the squares - nine squares spread over three strips - would allow it to occupy a full page elsewhere. César's rapid success enabled the series to be published in a full-page format from the nineteenth strip on May 5, 1960.

Secondary characters are grafted on around César, inspired to Maurice Tillieux by real people more or less close to him: Ernestine is inspired by his youngest daughter, the agent Petitcarné by one of his neighbors, and the cleaning lady Églantine by a cleaning lady who had worked for him. All this little world evolves in a neighborhood inspired to Maurice Tillieux by his neighborhood.

The series appeared regularly until July 28, 1966, when Maurice Tillieux stopped the series at gag two hundred and ninety-nine, feeling that he had come to the end of his subject and finding less and less inspiration. This was particularly true of his youngest daughter, who was about to turn eight and no longer uttered the spontaneous lines that inspired Ernestine.

César found a second life when he returned to Spirou from no. 1603, January 2, 1969, and simultaneously to Robbedoes, the Dutch-language equivalent of Spirou until 1973.

For the occasion, the gags that had appeared in Le Moustique were put in color and published in no particular order, with the deletion of some whose puns were unadaptable in Dutch. César was published until no. 1863, December 27, 1973. At the same time, four albums featuring the gags published in Spirou were released by Dupuis, while the gags published in Le Moustique and the first gags published in Spirou remained unpublished until the release of the complete Tout César in two volumes.

The series was published in parallel in four paperback albums, then reissued as a complete series in the 1980s and 1990s, and again in November 2011.

In Spirou no. 3041 of July 24, 1996, cartoonist Godi paid tribute to the series and its author Maurice Tillieux by drawing the three-hundredth gag in the series. Despite its numbering, this gag is only the 298th in the series. There's an error in the numbering of the series. There are two gags no. 33, and no gags no. 35, no. 36 and no. 37. As for gags no. 277 and no. 293, they are seriously modified copies of gags no. 5 and no. 37, respectively. The first four stories published in Spirou between 1957 and 1959 have their numbering, and are not part of the official numbering of the series, which was reset to zero when the series moved to Le Moustique in 1959.

== Characters ==
The hero of the series is César, a bohemian and hardened bachelor cartoonist. His ordinary life is punctuated by everyday troubles, of which he is often the victim. A rebel at heart, he's always repeating: “What's allowed by law must fit on the edge of a postage stamp!”; he's also hot-tempered and kind to the point of being trapped by his goodness. Despite his fits of anger, he's also a peaceful man who likes to smoke a pipe in his armchair and cook, an art in which he excels and knows. He could have a quiet life if he didn't have sticky neighbors around him, a housekeeper who makes trouble, and the local police officer who gave him 3,236 tickets in six months.

César's great accomplice is Ernestine, his neighbor's daughter. She must be around five years old, and possesses the perverse innocence of a child. She doesn't understand the useless complications of the adult world, which leads to some funny, but common-sense remarks. With her incredible repartee, she loves to play tricks, the victim of which is often poor Caesar. Maurice Tillieux drew inspiration for Ernestine's reflections from his own youngest daughter, Anne. Constable Petitcarn is the neighborhood policeman, as well as César's neighbor and Ernestine's father. He likes to write tickets for the smallest of reasons, César being his first victim with 3,236 tickets received in six months. Speaking of César, he likes to say: “I give him tickets for his good ”. A former soldier who fought in the war, he often pesters César with his wartime memories. In his family, he is known to have a sister-in-law who is a farmer and, according to him, never stops having calves. Maurice Tillieux was inspired to create the character by one of his neighbors, who never realized it. César also has a cleaning lady, Églantine, whose main characteristic is that she's lazy. She buys brooms to lean on while she waits for time to pass, and often complains that pretending to work is more tiring than actually working. Nevertheless, César finds her a good woman; she, for her part, criticizes César for being too intellectual and complicated. A lazy cleaning lady who had worked for Tillieux gave her the idea for this character.

Agent Petitcarné's son and Ernestine's brother is Ernest. He played Ernestine's role in the very first stories of the series, before being replaced by her. Thereafter, the only mention of him is that he's always busy playing marbles.

== Publication ==
=== Albums ===
==== Album publication history ====
The first César et Ernestine album appeared in 1964 in the gag de poche collection published by Dupuis. Containing 123 black-and-white pages, its title was simply César, and the series was not yet called César et Ernestine. Shortly afterwards, César (Deuxième service), the second album in the César series, was released in the Gag de Poche collection, as no. 12. Like the first album, it is in black and white.

The revival of César's gags in Spirou gave the series a new lease of life. Editions Dupuis took advantage of the situation to bring out a first large-format album in 1971, entitled L'école des gags. Paperback and in color, the series was renamed for the occasion César et Ernestine (for publications in Spirou, it always bore the name César). The second album, entitled La vie à deux, came out a few months later. The third volume, Quel métier!, in 1972. The fourth volume, Au fil des mauvais jours, was not released until two years later, in 1974. Despite these four albums, many of the César et Ernestine gags published in Le Moustique and Spirou remained unpublished.

They remained unpublished until 1988, when the first volume of Tout César came out, entitled Tout César - L'école des gags, and listing in chronological order the issues published in Le Moustique. It runs to 156 pages and is numbered 7, following the numbering of the earlier Tout Gil Jourdan albums by the same author, which comprised six volumes. The following year, 1989, saw the release of volume two, Au fil des (mauvais) jours, with 160 pages and no. 8.

In 1997, a new 160-page complete edition was released, entitled Tout César - Tome 1. Followed a few months later by volume two.

==== The original collection ====
1. L'école des gags, Dupuis, 1971 (Script and drawing: Maurice Tillieux)
2. La vie à deux, Dupuis, 1971 (Script and drawing: Maurice Tillieux)
3. Quel métier, Dupuis, 1972 (Script and drawing: Maurice Tillieux)
4. Au fil des mauvais jours, Dupuis, 1974 (Script and drawing: Maurice Tillieux)

==== Special issues ====
- GP 1 César, Dupuis, Gag de poche, 1964 (Script and drawing: Maurice Tillieux - Color: Black and white)
- GP 2 César (Deuxième service), Dupuis, Gag de poche, 1964 (Script and drawing: Maurice Tillieux - Color: Black and White)
- TT 7 Tout César - L'école des gags, Dupuis, 1988 (Script and drawing: Maurice Tillieux)
- TT 8 Tout César - Au fil des (mauvais) jours, Dupuis, 1989 (Script and drawing: Maurice Tillieux)
- TT 1 Tout César - Tome 1, Dupuis, 1997 (Script and drawing: Maurice Tillieux)
- TT 2 Tout César - Volume 2, Dupuis, 1997 (Script and drawing : Maurice Tillieux)

=== Magazines ===
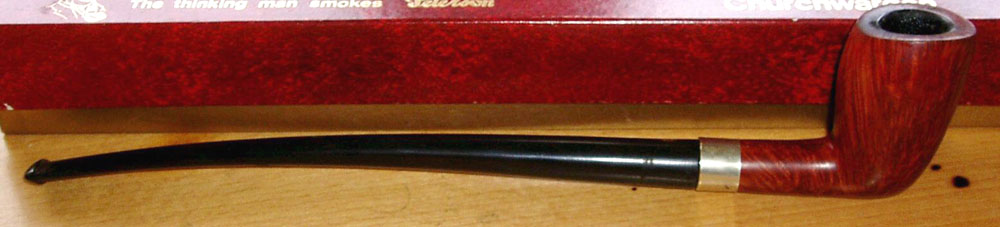
Pipe smoking is one of Caesar's favorite pastimes.

The series was created in Spirou No. 1004 on July 11, 1957, for the duration of four short stories. At the request of publisher Charles Dupuis, it was transferred on December 31, 1959, to Le Moustique, also owned by Editions Dupuis. The series was published in gag form once a week until it was finally discontinued on July 28, 19665. Subsequently, the gags published in Le Moustique were colored and reprinted as “filler” in Spirou and its Dutch-language equivalent Robbedoes. Due to the difficulty of translating the puns into Dutch, not all the gags in the series were reprinted in Spirou. The series made its last appearance in Spirou no. 1863, December 27, 1973. However, in Spirou no. 1999, one of Caesar's first stories was reprinted under the name Classiques Dupuis and in no. 3041, July 24, 1996, cartoonist Godi paid tribute to the series with a gag, no. 300.

== See also ==
- Spirou (magazine)
- Maurice Tillieux
- Dupuis

== Bibliography ==
- Tillieux, Maurice (1988). Tout César : L'école des gags. Dupuis. ISBN 2-8001-1534-3.
- Tillieux, Maurice (1989). Tout César: Au fil des (mauvais) jours, Charleroi/Paris. Dupuis. ISBN 2-8001-1649-8.
- Jour, Jean (1984). Monographie de la bande dessinée: M.Tillieux. Éditions du Perron. ISBN 2-87114-011-1.
- Tillieux, Maurice (2001). Les Dossier de la Bande Dessinée n° 10: Maurice Tillieux.
