= Josette Baujot =

Belgian artist

- Born: Josette Marie Louise Nondonfaz; 17 August 1920 Spa, Belgium
- Died: 13 August 2009 (aged 88)
- Area: Colourist
- Notable works: The Adventures of Tintin

Josette Baujot (17 August 1920 – 13 August 2009) was a Belgian artist and colorist. She is most commonly associated with fellow Belgian comics writer Hergé (Georges Remi) and his Adventures of Tintin series.

== Early life ==
She was born Josette Marie Louise Nondonfaz in Spa, Belgium. There she studied drawing and portraiture at the Academy of Fine Arts in Liège. She married Joseph Baujot in 1944, with whom she moved to Argentina. The couple bought a vineyard there and had a son.

Her life changed abruptly when Joseph was shot dead while hunting in 1953. It was reported that he had been shot by members of the French or Belgian resistance who had tracked him down; however Joseph lived long enough to inform police that he had been accidentally shot by his friend. Josette returned to Brussels after his death. She eventually found work at the Hergé Studios. In Brussels she met cartoonist Joseph Loeckx, also known by his nom de plume Jo-El Azara, creator of the character Taka Takata. He would remain her lifelong companion.

== Career ==
Originally, Hergé drew the cartoons for Tintin completely in black and white. As the popularity of the cartoons increased, he hired colorists to add color to the work. Baujot was hired in 1953, and eventually became Hergé's main colorist, along with Edgar Pierre Jacobs. She arrived as work was being completed for Destination Moon (Objectif Lune). Hergé was eventually very pleased with the outcome of her coloring.

Baujot developed a distinct style of coloring, involving mixing of shades as opposed to the standard use of stark, contrasting colors. She would hone her technique throughout the upcoming Tintin projects, the next being Cigars of the Pharaoh (Les Cigares du Pharaon, 1955).

Despite having differences and often arguing over ideas and plans, Hergé admired and respected Baujot, and they remained close friends. In his unfinished and final work, Tintin and Alph-Art, Hergé drew a new character named "Josette Laijot", an owner of a gallery, based on Baujot.

She died on 13 August 2009.
