= Scrameustache =

Science-fiction Belgian comic series

The Scrameustache

The Scrameustache is a fictional character in a science-fiction Franco-Belgian comics series of the same name. He was created by the Belgian artist Gos. Gos has written and drawn all the Scrameustache's adventures since 1972. Since the mid-1980s he has been assisted by his son Walt. Another son, Benoit has contributed as colourist. It is a popular, ongoing series.

== Background ==
=== Premise ===
The adventures of the Scrameustache first started in issue 1806 of Spirou magazine in November 1972 under the title Khéna et le Scrameustache (Khena and the Scrameustache). The story tells of how Khena, a young Peruvian boy living in Europe, meets a cat-like alien who has come to Earth in his own flying saucer. Khena lives with his adoptive father Uncle Georges in the small town of Chambon-Les-Roses and the Scrameustache moves in with them.

What made it a little different from most Earth-kid-meets-alien stories was that a certain amount of mystery surrounded Khena himself. As a toddler he had been found in the remains of an earthquake in Peru. He was then adopted by Georges Caillau, a European scholar, archaeologist and ethnologist. Some ten years later, Khena met the Scrameustache and proved himself resistant to the alien's (non-lethal) weapons and other technology. This resistance made the Scrameustache curious and he stuck around hoping that time would provide an explanation.

=== Title and Names ===
Khena's name was later dropped from the title of the series which is now just called Le Scrameustache. He does however remain a leading character, some of the stories looking at his development from a boy in his early teens to an actual teenager.

The name "Khena" is taken from the word Quena which is an Inca flute.

The name Scrameustache does not appear to be based on any puns or wordplays. Gos claims that he simply came up with strange names as part of a game with friends. The same could be said about the Smurfs, or Schtroumpfs, created by Peyo, and which Gos worked on for a while. However, in D'où viens-tu, Scrameustache, p. 12, it seems that Scrameustache is a backronym for Sujet Créé par Radiations Artificielles et Manipulations Extra-Utérines Sans Toucher Aux Chromosomes Héréditaires Endogènes (Subject created by artificial radiations and extra-uterine manipulations without touching to hereditary endogenic chromosomes).

Khena's adoptive father is Uncle Georges Caillau. "Caillau" sounds like "caillou" which is the French for "stone". In Le dilemme de Khéna (Khena's Dilemma), the young man indicates that George is descended from an aristocratic family called de la Roche (Roche being the French for "rock")

== The World of the Scrameustache ==
Over the years, Gos has expanded the Scrameustache's universe, with him and Khena travelling to other planets and mixing with other aliens, above all the Galaxians.

Using his saucer, he and Khena divide their time between Earth, planet Aktarka and its two neighbouring moons. Aktarka has at least two continents and a variety of archipelagos in its oceans. Due to the orbit of its moons, both can be seen from one continent, while the other continent only sees one; the continent with view on both moons is referred to as the Continent of the Two Moons. While referred to the other continent is so far not been visited in the series.

Aktarka does not have cities like Earth, instead its human populations lives in towns and villages where each person has a bit of land to cultivate food. Aktarka is mostly tropical, with temperate zones existing near its poles.

It is hinted in later albums that the citizens of Aktarka are descendants of Atlantians who managed to flee before the destruction of their continent on Earth. In the series the destruction is the result of falling debris of Earth smaller moon, when the Atlantians had changed its orbit as a technological boast towards the inhabitants of the continent Mü, they inadvertently placed it in the path of a comet which smashed the moon.

Uncle Georges lives on Earth; some human friends live on Aktarka; the friendly Galaxians live on one of the moons (the smaller of the two); and the warlike Kromoks live on the other.

== Characters ==
=== The Scrameustache ===
The Scrameustache is a genetically-created hybrid alien who resembles an upright cat. His feet are furry and hand-like and he can use them to grasp hold of handrails and other similar supports, in a way similar to a monkey. He was created by Najboul, a human scientist of planet Aktarka, who used elements of his planet's various species.

Aktarka's biggest mainland is known as the Continent of the Two Moons, and that is where the Scrameustache was trained as an astronaut. He later went to Earth on an undefined mission. It is hinted that the Aktarkian leaders feared his superior intelligence would turn against them and thus sent him into some kind of unofficial exile.

He now lives on Earth with Khena and Uncle Georges Caillau and is known to some of the locals.

The Scrameustache is an intelligent and charming character, always willing to go out of his way to help his friends. He can also be mischievous at times, especially towards Uncle Georges.

=== Clothing and Equipment ===
The Scrameustache wears a blue jumpsuit and an anti-gravity belt which slows down his falls. He does not wear shoes, except in winter time.

His main article is a bright red helmet with a brainwave-activated lamp that can be used to illuminate at will. It can also shoot a laser which paralyses people, turning then into pillars of salt for a short time. This is quite harmless unless they happen to be near water, in which case parts of their bodies may shrink as a result.

The aerials on the helmet can be used for communicating or listening into radio-emitted conversations, but this requires a certain amount of concentration on the part of the wearer.

His flying saucer is for intergalactic exploration and, by applying theories and calculations based on faster-than-light travel, can go back in time. He also has a two-seater wheel-less car-like vehicle called the Passe-partout which can fly within a breathable atmosphere.

Tobor is a robot owned by the Scrameustache. His "mouth" has the same functions as the Scrameustache's helmet "lamp": i.e. he can turn people temporarily into salt. He is also capable of flight.

=== Khena ===
Khena was found as a toddler in the remains of an earthquake in Peru. He was adopted by Georges Caillau. He first met the Scrameustache when he was in his early teens.

A later adventure established that Khena was himself an alien who came from Aktarka, the same planet as his cat-like friend. (There are hints in the earlier storyline that Gos intended this from the start.)

Khena and the Scrameustache now spend much of their time travelling to Aktarka and other planets to visit friends and relatives. But their main home is still on Earth where they loyally stick by Uncle Georges.

=== Uncle Georges ===
Uncle Georges Caillau is a European scholar, archaeologist and ethnologist. He adopted Khena while on an archaeological dig in Peru. He refrains from space travelling if he can avoid it and finds journeys back in time a bit nerve-racking. Although a very decent man he is quick-tempered at times, and especially finds his son's alien friends a bit of a handful. (On one occasion the Scrameustache unintentionally produced a clone of himself: "As if one wasn't enough !" groaned Uncle Georges.)

=== The Galaxians ===
The Galaxians are friendly, little green people who live on one of the moons that orbit planet Aktarka. Khena and the Scrameustache frequently visit them.

Galaxian society is very democratic, even in the sharing of tasks: for example, while away on missions, the crew members of a space ship take it in turn to be the ship's captain, or Chief-of-the-Day. The annual head of state is called the Prince-of-the-Year and is the Galaxian who received the most merit points over the past year.

In overall charge is the Council of Elders which is made up of five older long-bearded Galaxians. However, they are not as wise as they would like to make out and one or two of them are quite senile; in fact a lot of their time is spent arguing between each other. The younger Galaxians are quite aware of their deficiencies and often enjoy a good laugh at the Elder's expense (in one story a young Galaxian lawyer did warn the Elders in their faces that he could cause them to "lose what little credit for wisdom you have left".)

(From the early-1980s to the late-1990s, many one-page gags and short stories were published in Spirou magazine under the title Les Galaxiens, giving humorous descriptions of Galaxian society. Some of the longer stories, such as Le prince des Galaxiens (The Galaxian Prince) or L'oeuf astral (The Astral Egg) could be described as actual Galaxian adventures with Khena and the Scrameustache appearing simply because they were the stars of the series.)

The Galaxians are not native to the moon they inhabit, in the album [The Children of the Rainbow]. Khena, Scrameustache and friends are stuck on an island where a strange meteorite blocks their technology. They discover a 'temple' with the story of the first colony ship of the Galaxians, having crash landed on the island due to the same reasons our friends are stuck. The Galaxians left their world cause it was heating up without them knowing why. They later discover a ship sent by the descendants of those who stayed is also stuck on the island. Eventually the meteorite disrupting all the technology is found and neutralized. The colony ship is also found and its passengers awakened set to integrate into the new Galaxian society.

=== Khena's other family ===
Khena's actual parents are Torcal, an eminent scientist from planet Aktarka, and his wife. They were sent to Earth on a mission to Peru and took their baby son Gari with them. However, an enemy had sabotaged their spaceship and, while testing it, they were sent to an unknown period of time and space leaving Gari behind. He was found by local Peruvian Indians and named Khena. Adjusting to life in another period of Earth's past (the European 16th Century), Torcal and his wife had two more children, son Thibaut and a daughter Berengere. They were eventually found and returned to Aktarka. Khena knew that the local laws restricted families to two children each and used this in order to stay on Earth with Uncle Georges. During the school holidays he uses the Scrameustache's saucer to visit them on Aktarka.

Other Aktarkians include Torcal's brother Yamouth and his daughter Pilili.

=== The Ramouchas ===
Ramouchas are bear-like creatures from planet Aktarka. They live on an island separated from the main continent. One of them played an important role in the Scrameustache's upbringing. They are intelligent beings, though they are not capable of speaking. They are friendly and fun-loving but give off electric shocks as a form of humour.

=== Falzar, the Wizard of the Great Bear (Ursa Major) ===
Falzar, the Wizard of the Great Bear (Ursa Major), is the nearest the Scrameustache has to a sworn enemy. He is a powerful and power-crazed wizard. At one stage he was turned into a menhir by undetermined aliens and placed on Earth amongst the Carnac stones in Brittany, France. Falzar occasionally manages to break free of his imprisonment and gets up to all sorts of devilish plots, such as turning people into animals. In the end though, he usually ends up as a menhir again and is returned to the alignments. The word "Falzar" is French slang for trousers.

=== The Kromoks and the Stixes ===
Another set of enemies are the Kromoks and the Stixes. Planet Aktarka has two moons: the friendly Galaxians live on one of the moons; and the warlike Kromoks on the other. While the Stixes often visit Aktarka and its moons, there are no indications that they are native to either. The ape-like Kromoks aim to conquer Aktarka but being naturally stupid does not make it easy. The Stixes, yellow-skinned with pointed heads, are, on the other hand, ingenious and conniving characters and it is they who come up with the plans that the Scrameustache and his friends have to face.

== Story Summaries ==
The Scrameustache's adventures have not been published in English. Below is a list of the French titles, their year of publication, an English translation of the titles and a brief description. They are listed in order of publication. All the stories have been written and drawn by Gos. Since 1985, his son Walt has assisted in the drawing.

Between 1972 and 2019, 44 books of the Scrameustache's adventures have been published.

Title	Date of publication	Written by	English translation	Artist
"L’Héritier de l’Inca"	1972	Gos	[The Heir to the Inca]	Gos
Khena is a young Peruvian boy who lives in the European village of Chambon-Les-Roses with his adopted father, Uncle Georges Caillau. One day he meets the Scrameustache, a friendly cat-like alien, on an undefined mission to Earth.
"Le Magicien de la Grande Ourse"	1974	Gos	[The Wizard of the Great Bear]	Gos
While witnessing extraterrestrial activity amongst the Carnac stones of Brittany, one of Uncle Georges' friends is turned into a minotaur! The Scrameustache's attempt to help him out leads to the unleashing of a powerful and power-crazed wizard called Falzar.
"Le Continent des Deux Lunes"	1974	Gos	[The Continent of the Two Moons]	Gos
Khena is picked up by two human-like aliens who discover that he is in fact one of their own and take him back to his native planet, Aktarka ! They hope to find out what happened to his parents who went missing while on a mission to Earth ten years previously. The Scrameustache follows them to sort things out, and settle a score with an old enemy.
"Le Totem de l'espace"	1975	Gos	[The Totem Pole from Space]	Gos
Khena, the Scrameustache and Uncle Georges travel to the Canadian province of Quebec in order to witness the landing of a rocket ship. It's the prelude to an alien invasion!
"Le Fantôme du cosmos"	1976	Gos	[The Ghost from the Cosmos]	Gos
A distress call leads Khena and the Scrameustache to a haunted spaceship. The ghost, an alien astronaut called Snopsy, asks for help to escape his enemies.
"La Fugue du Scrameustache"	1977	Gos	[The Scrameustache Runs Away]	Gos
Anxious to keep the Scrameustache secret from the locals, Uncle Georges confines him to his cottage. But the mischievous little extraterrestrial has a few ideas of his own and sets off to become more public.
"Les Galaxiens"	1978	Gos	[The Galaxians]	Gos
The Scrameustache is re-united with a group of Galaxians, friendly little green creatures from one of the moons which orbit planet Aktarka. They soon integrate into the life of the local town, but are also unjustly blamed when things go wrong.
"La Menace des Kromoks"	1979	Gos	[The Kromok Threat]	Gos
A Galaxian ship is hijacked by the Kromoks, a warlike race of aliens who intend to conquer planet Aktarka. Khena and the Scrameustache set off to help their friends and relatives.
"Le Dilemme de Khéna"	1980	Gos	[Khena's Dilemma]	Gos
Khena has a dream that leads him to believe that his parents are alive in 16th-century Europe. Accompanied by a Ramoucha and two Galaxians, he, the Scrameustache and Uncle Georges go back in time in order to find out.
"Le Prince des Galaxiens"	1981	Gos	[The Galaxian Prince]	Gos
Every year the most deserving Galaxian is made the annual head-of-state, but proceedings are ruined when a cheat attempts to hack the main computer and get the post for himself. A miscalculation results in him and the real winner being on equal points! Desperate measures are required to sort things out, including help from a very unexpected source.
"Le Renégat"	1981	Gos	[The Renegade]	Gos
The Galaxian who tried to cheat his way into becoming Prince leads a jailbreak involving the leader of the warlike Kromoks. With galactic peace at stake, Khena and the Scrameustache set off to recapture the Renegade and the Kromok chieftain.
"Ramouchas en péril"	1982	Gos	[Ramouchas in Peril]	Gos
The Ramouchas live on a small island on planet Aktarka. When some of them end up drowned on a mainland beach, Khena and the Scrameustache try to find out what prompts them to swim away from their island, and discover a nasty plot.
"Le Satellite fou"	1982	Gos	[The Crazy Satellite]	Gos
A satellite crash-lands in a dense rainforest and its radiation has a strange effect on the local area and wildlife.
"La Saga de Thorgull"	1983	Gos	[The Saga of Thorgull]	Gos
The building of a new road means that Khena, the Scrameustache and Uncle Georges have to vacate their cottage. A Galaxian building crew helps them to restore an old manor house, but a strange young woman also has an interest in the place.
"Le Secret des Trolls"	1984	Gos	[The Secret of the Trolls]	Gos
A Viking helmet has magically stuck itself to Uncle Georges' head! The Scrameustache organises an expedition to go back in time and convince the Troll-witch responsible to lift the curse.
"Les Kromoks en folie"	1985	Gos	[The Kromoks Go Crazy]	Gos, Walt, Pierre Seron
The leader of the warlike Kromoks escapes from a Galaxian prison, taking Khena as a hostage! When the Scrameustache and the Galaxians strike back they get help from some unexpected allies.
"Le Stagiaire"	1986	Gos	[The Trainee]	Gos
A trainee Galaxian astronaut is sent to stay on Earth for a few days, but his bungling attempts at trying to be useful prove quite trying to Uncle Georges' nerves!
"Le Grand Retour"	1987	Gos	[The Great Return]	Gos, Walt
Khena's parents and siblings are due to return to the present from their exile in 16th-century Europe, but things get complicated when Khena's sister disappears to another time period!
"Les Galaxiens s’en vont en gags"	1987	Gos	[Galaxian Gags]	Gos, Walt
A collection of funny stories involving the everyday lives of the Galaxians, Khena and the Scrameustache's little green friends.
"D’où viens-tu Scrameustache ?"	1988	Gos	[Where Are You From, Scrameustache?]	Gos, Walt
The Scrameustache's origins are revealed. He is a genetically-created hybrid of various species of planet Aktarka and is coveted by many unscrupulous characters.
"Les Figueuleuses"	1989	Gos	[The Figueuleuses]	Gos, Walt
The Galaxian known as the Renegade gets married and goes on honeymoon on a tropical part of the planet. But his bride feels that his love is only half-hearted and summons Falzar, the Wizard of the Great Bear, for help! Not the wisest of moves...
"Le Sosie"	1989	Gos	[The Double]	Gos, Walt
A Princess from planet Venicoba asks Khena and the Scrameustache to help save her kingdom from reptile-like invaders. One trick in their favour is that Khena is the spitting image of her brother!
"L’Œuf astral"	1991	Gos	[The Astral Egg]	Gos, Walt
A mysterious gnome asks the Galaxian Princess to intercept an egg travelling through space. The mission, led by Khena, the Scrameustache and the Prince, proves far from easy: the only crew available is made up of young Galaxian space cadets, which leads to chaos all over the ship!
"Chroniques galaxiennes"	1991	Gos	[Galaxian Chronicles]	Gos, Walt
More mishaps in the everyday lives of the Galaxians.
"La Caverne tibétaine"	1992	Gos	[The Tibetan Cave]	Gos, Walt
Khena, the Scrameustache and Uncle Georges set off to help Tibetan monks keep some age-old secrets away from the Chinese forces.
"Le Cristal des Atlantes"	1993	Gos	[The Crystal of the Atlantians]	Gos, Walt
Earth is in danger of being destroyed and it is up to Uncle Georges to save it! But he has no idea of the nature of the threat and his only clue is a pastoral-like staff dating from the time of the lost continent of Atlantis. Another journey back in time is in order.
"Le Bêtisier galaxien"	1992-1996	Gos, Fabrizio Borrini and François Gilson	[Galaxian Howlers]	Gos, Walt
More everyday mishaps for the little green aliens.
"Les Enfants de l’arc-en-ciel"	1994	Gos	[The Children of the Rainbow]	Gos, Walt
While exploring an island on the Galaxian moon world, Khena and the Scrameustache discover that their little green friends are just one of many Galaxian races. (This story highlights race relations and pokes fun at some aspects of political correctness.)
"Les Naufragés du Chastang"	1995	Gos	[The Chastang Castaways]	Gos
Khena and the Scrameustache go to the rescue of telepathic aliens whose ship has crashed in a lake in central France. The recovery of the ship is made complicated by the curiosity of the local military.
"Les Petits Gris"	1996	Gos	[The Little Greys]	Gos
The Galaxians intercept a space probe which is calling Khena and the Scrameustache for help. They have to try to find the last surviving princess of the lost continent of Atlantis, who has been missing for twelve thousand years! (Much of this adventure takes place in the restored village of Pommerol and features the real-life restorer Doctor Paul Vuillard, to whom the story is dedicated.)
"Le Président galaxien"	1997	Gos	[The Galaxian President]	Gos, Walt
A computer breakdown means that the Galaxians have to resort to other means to choose their Prince-of-the-year. But are Earth-like elections really the best solution? (This story pocks fun at democratic politics at a time when many in Western Europe were taking a very cynical view towards democracy. It also raises the issue — and potential chaos — of imposing new forms of government on old established institutions.)
"L’Épreuve du sablier"	1998	Gos	[The Test of the Sand Glass]	Gos
When the Earth continent of Atlantis was destroyed, the inhabitants fled to a new planet, Atlantis II. When the King dies without an immediate heir Khena and the Scrameustache try to help their friend Princess Lila stake her claim to the throne. But a ruthless rival is out to stop them !
"La Fontaine des mutants"	1999	Gos	[The Fountain of the Mutants]	Gos
Khena and the Scrameustache investigate an island on planet Aktarka, whose water source turns living beings into animals.
"Tempête chez les Figueuleuses"	2001	Gos	[Storm Among the Figueuleuses]	Gos, Walt
A violent storm devastates a tropical island on the Galaxian moon world. The Galaxians set off to help the native Figueuleuses, but the mission is fraught with problems. Meanwhile the Scrameustache's investigation of the storm leads him to believe that some old enemies are responsible !
"Le Réveil du Mirmidon"	2001	Gos	[The Mirmidon Awakes]	Gos
During an outing on their moon world, Khena and some Galaxians discover a strange dwarf, who has 48 hours to set up a community for his missing brothers and their wives or face annihilation! But finding them proves a major task, and a foul and smelly experience for the Galaxians.
"Le Retour de Falzar"	2002	Gos	[The Return of Falzar]	Gos, Walt
Khena and the Scrameustache discover the origins of their powerful enemy Falzar, the Wizard of the Great Bear. He himself is brought back to life and provokes havoc all over the place. The Scrameustache decides that he has no option but to face his enemy on equal terms.
"L’Antre de Satic"	2005	Gos	[Satic's Lair]	Gos, Walt
The Scrameustache's attempt to acquire magic powers has some unforeseen consequences, namely a second Scrameustache! Not only that, but the kidnapping of a young boy and the involvement of Galaxians and a Ramucha does not really help Uncle Georges' mood. And there is still Falzar to deal with!
"Casse-tête Olmèque"	2006	Gos	[Olmec Headache]	Gos, Walt
A young woman archaeologist asks Uncle George for help when she discovers an Olmec head statue which displays strange properties: one of which is slowly turning a colleague of hers into gold! This fact alone covets the attention of some strange characters from space as well as some unscrupulous ones from Earth.
"Les Exilés"	2007	Gos	[The Exiled]	Gos, Walt
The testing of a new Galaxian spaceship goes wrong when it is dragged into a blue hole. Khena, Scrameustache and a group of Galaxians end up on an unknown planet, but it soon turns out that one of the group deliberately orchestrated the whole thing.
"L'Elfe des étoiles"	2008	Gos	[The Elf from the Stars]	Gos
"La Clé de l’hexagramme"	2009	Gos	[The Hexagram Key]	Gos
"Les Passagers clandestins"	2010	Gos	[Stowaways]	Gos
"Le Lauréat « K22 »"	2011	Gos	[The "K22" Winner]	Gos
"Le Géant d'Imenoca"	2014	Gos	[The Imenoca Giant]	Gos
"Les caprices de Cupidon"	2016	Gos	[Cupid's Whims]	Gos
"La porte des deux mondes"	2019	Gos	[The Gateway to Two Worlds]	Gos
