= François Gilson =

Belgian comics writer

Gilson
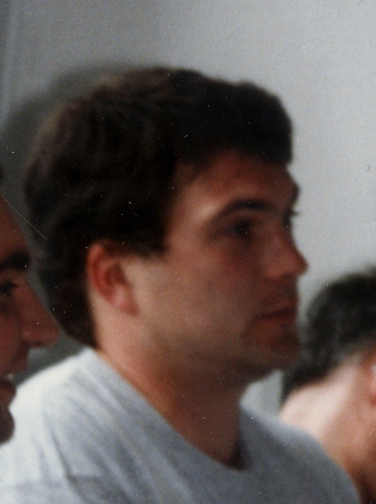
- François Gilson in 1996
- Born: François Gilson; 16 November 1965 (age 61) Arolsen, West Germany
- Area: writer
- Notable works: Mélusine (comics)

François Gilson (French: [ʒilsɔ̃]; born 16 November 1965) is a Belgian comics author. Signing his work simply as Gilson, he is best known for Mélusine.

== Biography ==
François Gilson was born in 1965 in Arolsen, West Germany, where his father, who was with the Belgian Army, was stationed. He studied art at the Academy of Fine Arts in his hometown Liège, but soon turned to writing instead of artwork. Gilson created his first comic Rebecca in 1987, with Clarke, an old friend from school (born on the same day as Gilson) with whom he had started the fanzine Cafard already in secondary school. He professionally started working for Spirou magazine in 1989, where he became one of the main writers. Apart from contributing to the existing series Scrameustache, he wrote new series like Cactus Club for Bercovici, Mélusine for Clarke, and Garage Isidore for Olis (later succeeded by Stédo).

== Bibliography ==
- Rebecca: Bon anniversaire, Papy: 1987: artwork by Clarke, published by Khany
- Garage Isidore: 1990 - : 12 albums, artwork by Olis, Stédo and now Alain Sikorski, published by Dupuis
- Mélusine: 1992 - : 16 albums, artwork by Clarke, published by Dupuis (two translated in English by Cinebook Ltd)
- Cactus Club: 1997 - : 9 albums, artwork by Philippe Bercovici, published by Dupuis
- Sourimousse: 2002 - 2003: 9 illustrated books, artwork by Peral, published by Hemma (4 translated in English, 8 in Spanish, 2 in Norwegian, 1 in Portuguese (Brazil))
- Les Courriers de l'étrange
- Les Vétos: artwork by Peral, first album announced, published by Bamboo
- Les Soeurs du mal: artwork by Schmurl, first album announced
