= Gil Jourdan =

Belgian comic book series

Gil Jourdan is a Belgian detective comic strip created by Maurice Tillieux. It is a combination of mystery, adventure and humour.

From left to right: Libellule, Jourdan and Crouton on the cover of an omnibus edition

== Origin and premise ==
In 1956 the Belgian comic magazine Héroïc Albums ceased publication. Felix, the adventures of a young bespectacled detective written and drawn by Maurice Tillieux, was among the casualties, but returned in Spirou magazine as Gil Jourdan, though without the glasses.

Jourdan made his first appearance in a rather original manner: in issue 962 of Spirou, the bungling police Inspector Crouton takes wisecracking burglar Libellule out of prison in order to proceed to a reconstruction of a theft for which he has been arrested. Libellule is then snatched from right under Crouton's nose by a young man named Gil Jourdan. Jourdan is a private investigator in need of a big break and he thinks that Libellule's burglary skills could be useful in exposing a gang of popaïne [sic] smugglers.

Once the smugglers' ring had been captured, the trio of Jourdan, Libellule and Crouton would proceed to handle other cases which sometimes took them from France to South America and the Middle East, Libellule and Crouton providing the comic relief which contrasted with Jourdan's earnest nature. Looking on was Queue-de-Cerise, Jourdan's secretary who sometimes also helped out in the investigations.

== Main characters ==
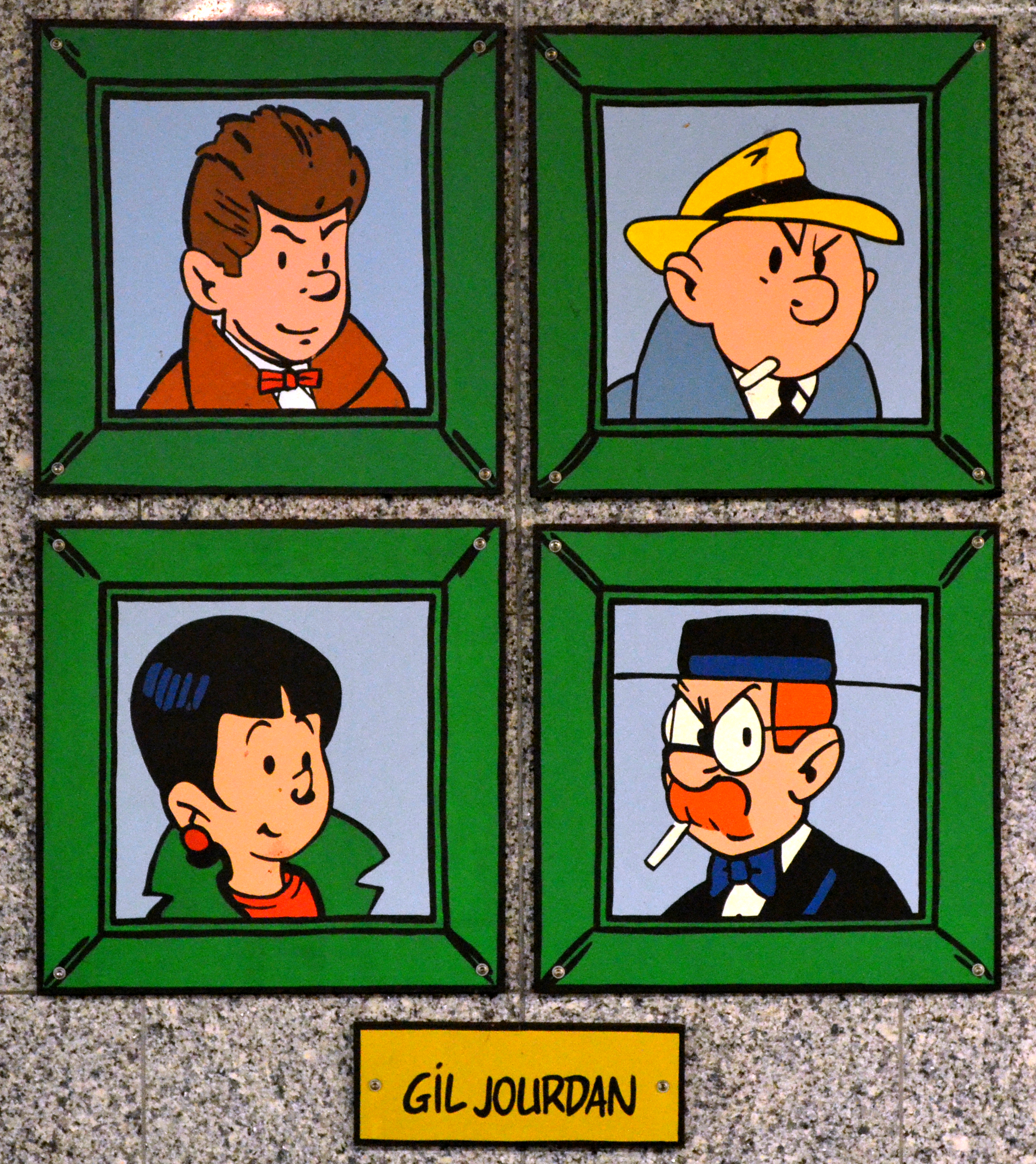
Clockwise from top left: Gil Jourdan, Libellule, Inspector Crouton and Queue-de-Cerise.

Gil Jourdan is a Paris-based detective. A Bachelor of Law ("I started very early"), he is young, earnest, shrewd and cool-headed. No mystery can stand up to him and he has quite a merit in solving them given the people he has to work with.

From the start Jourdan was hardly the sort of hero who was out for Justice in itself. His main motivation was earning money and exposing a gang of drugs smugglers was really a means of obtaining a big break from which he profited in many ways.

Andre Papignolles alias Libellule (French for "Dragonfly") is a former burglar who becomes Jourdan's right-hand. Jourdan finds his know-how in the field of thievery very useful. Libellule is full of good humour, but he tends to be the only one who laughs at his puns and jokes. The name "Libellule" comes from one of Felix's early stories, La Liste n°3, where it was the nickname of a thief who burglarized Felix's hotel room.

Inspector Jules Annibal Crouton is Jourdan's police contact. In the course of their first encounters he was the subject of several humiliating experiences, courtesy of Jourdan and Libellule. He did not bear a grudge however and accompanied them on most of their subsequent cases, even recommending them to clients. Jourdan would even refer to him as "eccentric not stupid", after Crouton had saved his life.

Queue-de-Cerise (French for "Cherry Stem") is Jourdan's secretary and often helps out in the actual cases. Like her boss she is of a serious nature and has little patience for Libellule's humour. She speaks nine languages. Her favourite means of transport is a scooter.

The Renault Dauphine was Jourdan's choice of vehicle in his early adventures. If he has a lucky streak that has got him out of many a dangerous situation, the same cannot be said for his cars which have often been the resultant victims. Later, as his agency became more successful, he obtained a Renault R17.

== Publication and legacy ==
First appearing in Spirou magazine, Jourdan's adventures were then published in book form and even as omnibus editions which included short stories and other Tillieux detectives like Bob Slide (an FBI man in the 1930s), Felix (the original Jourdan) and Marc Jaguar (another detective).

In later years the drawing was entrusted to the artist Gos while Tillieux stuck to the writing. Tillieux' death in a car accident in 1978 brought an end to the series, though a number of short stories by other artists were drawn and published in homage to him and Jourdan some ten years later.

== Notes on some of the stories ==
A short story La poursuite (The Pursuit) was published in issue 1316 of Spirou in 1963 and acted as a prequel to the series. In it Crouton makes several desperate attempts to arrest Libellule. This story takes place before either of them meets Jourdan.

Jourdan's early adventures were banned in France by the censor, who objected to the portrayal of the French police, represented by Crouton, as bungling, incompetent no-hopers. Crouton later became a more efficient police officer, even if he was sometimes a bit slow on deductions. The ban was later lifted.

La rue perdue (The Lost Street), published in 1978, was set in 1953 and was thus yet another prequel to the series. The story is also notable for being published in the quarterly magazine Tintin Special (see Tintin magazine), Spirou's main competitor. Sadly and ironically it was also Tillieux's final Jourdan adventure.

== Stories ==
To date four of Jourdan's adventures have been published in English. Below is a list of the French titles, their year of publication, an English translation of the titles and a brief description. They are listed in order of publication.

=== By Tillieux ===
French Title	Date of Publication	English Translation	Writer	Artist
"Libellule s'évade"	1956	[Libellule Escapes]	Maurice Tillieux	Maurice Tillieux
Convicted burglar Libellule is snatched from under the nose of police Inspector Crouton by private detective Gil Jourdan who needs his help in breaking up a gang of drug smugglers.
"Popaïne et vieux tableaux"	1956	[Popaïne and Old Paintings]	Maurice Tillieux	Maurice Tillieux
Between them Jourdan, Libellule and Queue-de-Cerise have traced the smugglers' route. Now comes the difficult bit: getting the evidence without getting Crouton under their feet.
"La voiture immergée"	1958	[Lit:The Submerged Car, published as Murder by High Tide]	Maurice Tillieux	Maurice Tillieux
While driving off the coast of Brittany, antique dealer Nikita Zix and his car are swept out to sea. Items in his collection then turn out to be fakes. Can Jourdan solve the mystery without falling into the same fatal trap and is Zix really dead?
"Les cargos du crépuscule"	1959	[Lit:The Twilight Cargo, published as Catch as Catch Can]	Maurice Tillieux	Maurice Tillieux
Syringe Joe, a dangerous criminal, escapes from prison in a way that defies explanation. He blames his lawyer for his conviction. Even Jourdan cannot foil the lawyer's kidnapping and events take an even more sinister turn for the young detective himself.
"L'enfer de Xique-Xique"	1960	[The Hell of Xique-Xique, published as Ten Thousand Years in Hell]	Maurice Tillieux	Maurice Tillieux
Jourdan and Libellule journey to a South American dictatorship in order to find a kidnapped weapons designer. Arrested on trumped-up charges of espionage they are taken to the prison-mines of Xique-Xique in the middle of a scorching desert from which escape is said to be impossible.
"Surboum pour 4 roues"	1961	[Having a Bang on 4 Wheels, published as Boom and Bust]	Maurice Tillieux	Maurice Tillieux
Jourdan receives a threatening letter which is actually addressed to someone else. Intrigued, he and Libellule go to see the letter's recipient. Is he really in danger, or are other motives at work?
"Les moines rouges"	1962	[The Red Monks]	Maurice Tillieux	Maurice Tillieux
The mayor of a small village asks Jourdan to investigate a haunted abbey. Jourdan is quick to discover that the ghost is anything but a genuine spook. However solving one mystery does lead to another.
"La poursuite"	1963	[The Pursuit]	Maurice Tillieux	Maurice Tillieux
In a prequel to the series, Crouton investigates the theft of a singer's jewellery. He suspects Libellule but catching the tricky, wisecracking burglar proves easier said than done. (This story takes place before either of them meets Jourdan.)
"Les trois taches"	1963	[The Three Stains]	Maurice Tillieux	Maurice Tillieux
A company specialising in aerial photography is the victim of a burglary and its photographer disappears. Even with a pair of bungling crooks to deal with, Jourdan's inquiry is far from easy.
"Les vacances de Crouton"	1964	[Crouton's Holiday]	Maurice Tillieux	Maurice Tillieux
A well-earned break turns out to be far from relaxing for the hapless inspector.
"Le gant à trois doigts"	1964	[The Three-Fingered Glove]	Maurice Tillieux	Maurice Tillieux
When a box loaded with gloves with just three fingers on them is seized by French customs, Jourdan follows up the case to a Middle Eastern emirate. There he is promptly captured and jailed, but escapes leaving a wave of chaos behind him.
"La guerre en caleçon"	1966	[Underwear Warfare]	Maurice Tillieux	Maurice Tillieux
In a desert war zone, Jourdan, Libellule and Crouton are assigned to recapture three escaped spies. But they are themselves captured by the spies who take their clothes, leaving them to resume the chase in vests and underpants.
"Le Chinois à deux roues"	1966	[The Two-Wheeled Chinaman]	Maurice Tillieux	Maurice Tillieux
A Chinese businessman finds his sales of scooters undercut by non-authorised imports and asks Jourdan to investigate. The smugglers themselves resort to increasingly nasty methods to stay in business.
"Chaud et froid"	1967	[Hot and Cold]	Maurice Tillieux	Maurice Tillieux
Jourdan investigates the theft of valuable fur coats in the principality of Monte-Cavallo, while Libellule becomes a reluctant wrestler.
"Le grand souffle"	1968	[The Big Blow]	Maurice Tillieux	Maurice Tillieux
A mountain gives off huge gusts of air that blow passing sheep up-and-away. This leads to a secret wind tunnel used to test the latest supersonic aircraft. Jourdan is not the only one to be interested in this plane.
"La bouteille"	1968	[The Bottle]	Maurice Tillieux	Maurice Tillieux
A lost bottle of champagne is a good way for a thief to prepare himself for a Christmas robbery, but this one has been filled with laughing gas which Libellule had intended for Crouton.
"L'armée évanouie"	1969	[The Vanished Army]	Maurice Tillieux	Maurice Tillieux
In a written short story, Jourdan, Libellule and Crouton go to Mexico to find out why an entire army went missing during the Mexican Revolution of 1910.
"La maison du mystère"	1969	[The House of Mystery]	Maurice Tillieux	Maurice Tillieux
An old colleague asks Crouton round for a visit. Libellule then discovers that the colleague has been dead for three months, so who summoned Crouton and why?
"Pâtée explosive"	1969	[Explosive Pate]	Maurice Tillieux	Maurice Tillieux
Jourdan decides to check over the property of a man whose behaviour has caused complaints from the neighbours. But when he sneaks in he is attacked by robots and assaulted when he gets out.
"Pris au piège"	1970	[Caught in a Trap]	Maurice Tillieux	Francis Jacques
"Carats en vrac"	1970	[Carats in Bulk]	Maurice Tillieux	Gos
Jourdan and Libellule get more than they bargained for when they give a hitch-hiker a lift. The man is pursued by some determined enemies and this leads to a fast and furious chase from the marshlands of the countryside to the rooftops of Paris.
"Les santons"	1970	[The Christmas Crib Figures]	Maurice Tillieux	Gos
Crouton's purchase of a Christmas present leads to a battle with spies and a pursuit with a hovercraft over land.
"Coup d'éclat"	1971	[A Light Hit]	Maurice Tillieux	Gos
A woman asks Jourdan to help clear her husband who has been arrested for the murder of his business partner by sabotaging his car.
"Gil Jourdan et les fantômes"	1971	[Gil Jourdan and the Ghosts]	Maurice Tillieux	Gos
A man claims to have seen his deceased brother wandering about the countryside. Jourdan's inquiry leads him to an old World War II bunker and two Libellules!
"La cloche hantée"	1971	[The Haunted Bell]	Maurice Tillieux	TBA
"L'abominable jouet"	1971	[The Abominable Toy]	Maurice Tillieux	TBA
"L'homme au pull blanc"	1971	[The Man in the White Sweater]	Maurice Tillieux	Gos
Queue-de-Cerise is harassed by a flea tamer whose sweet little pupils have been stolen and will not take no for an answer. She is more concerned with protecting a former circus manager who has been receiving death threats.
"Les mémoires de Libellule"	1972	[Libellule's Memoirs]	Maurice Tillieux	Gos
"Sur la piste d'un 33 tours"	1972	[On the Trail of a 33 RPM]	Maurice Tillieux	Gos
Libellule buys Crouton a record, but it gets mixed up with another one which has the same cover. The owners of the other record discover the mix-up and go to desperate lengths to recover their own copy: to the point of threatening Queue-de-Cerise and causing chaos all over motorways and camp sites.
"Entre deux eaux"	1978	[Caught in the Water Crossing]	Maurice Tillieux	Gos
An arms collector calls for help when his pride and joy, a pocket submarine, is stolen. Jourdan is intrigued not so much on who did it as to why it was done.
"La rue perdue"	1978	[The Lost Street]	Maurice Tillieux	Maurice Tillieux
In another prequel to the series, Jourdan investigates when a black African student friend is the victim of a macabre joke. (This story is inspired by the case of Madame du Barry and her page Zamor.)

=== Post-Tillieux ===
The series ended in 1978 following Tillieux's death. Ten years later Soleils Editions published the comic book L'Hommage à Gil Jourdan - Les enquêtes de leurs amis ("Homage to Gil Jourdan - Their Friends' Cases") with the approval of Tillieux's family. It featured Jourdan and his colleagues in adventures written and drawn by other writers and artists, including several leading ones such as Pierre Seron, Turk, Éric Maltaite and Tillieux's former assistant Stephen Desberg. The stories also featured some of the crooks from the Tillieux period returning and seeking revenge. Tillieux had been notable for not using the same enemy twice. The cover was drawn by François Walthéry.

French Title	Date of Publication	English Translation	Writer	Artist
"Injection directe"	1989	[Direct Injection]	Turk	Turk
Summoned by a client to a seedy part of town, Jourdan and Libellule face a drug dealer who wants revenge for them busting up his operation.
"Le Secret de Nicolas Flamel"	1989	[The Secret of Nicolas Flamel]	Bom	Pierre Seron
Jourdan investigates when a friend receives various threats aimed at forcing him off his property.
"Meurtre dans la nuit"	1989	[Murder in the Night]	François Dimberton	François Dimberton
An anonymous letter leads Jordan and Libellule to a spooky graveyard which coincidentally leads them straight back to town and a trap.
"Ours en peluche et popaïne"	1989	[Teddy Bear and Popaïne]	Stephen Desberg	Éric Maltaite
Jourdan helps out a young woman threatened by her ex-employer: the owner of a toy store angered at the fact that she sold a teddy bear.
"Les Sept bains de Libellule"	1989	[Libellule's Seven Baths]	Chris Libens	Laudec
It is not easy for Jourdan and Crouton to investigate a murder in the town of Spa with Libellule's constant guffawing at his own jokes.
"Un Bouton de trop"	1989	[A Switch Too Many]	Vittorio	Jacques Sandron
A grateful client sends Jourdan an old Renault Dauphine. Queue-de-Cerise refuses to try it out with Libellule as a fellow passenger, which is just as well...
"Meurtres télécommandés"	1989	[Murder by Remote Control]	François Corteggiani	Pierre Tranchand
Jourdan looks into a series of explosions, the victims of which have included foreign political dissidents and the owner of a video store.
"En pleine forme"	1989	[Fighting Fit]	Vittorio	Gauthier
Jourdan races his Dauphine through the streets; Libellule is the only one who roars with laughter at his own jokes; Queue-de-Cerise drops in a few cynical comments; and Crouton has to put up with it all. Thus it's business as usual, with Tillieux himself looking on.

== English translations ==
In August 2011, Fantagraphics published a translated volume, collecting the third and fourth volume of the original series.

== In popular culture ==
In the Belgian Comic Strip Center in Brussels the permanent exhibition brings homage to the pioneers of Belgian comics, among them Maurice Tillieux and "Gil Jourdan".

Gil Jourdan is among the many Belgian comics characters to jokingly have a Brussels street named after them. The Rue des Bouchers/Lange Beenhouwersstraat has a commemorative plaque with the name Rue Gil Jourdan/ Guus Slim straat placed under the actual street sign.

In May 2009 a wall was dedicated to Gil Jourdan in the Leopold I-straat/Rue Leopold I 201 in Laeken, Belgium as part of the Brussels' Comic Book Route. There are also two mural paintings dedicated to the series in Auderghem, one in the Rue du Vieux Moulin/Oudemolenstraat and the other in the Rue Emile Idiers/Emile Idiers straat.
