= Mélusine (comics) =

Belgian comic strip

- Mélusine the teenage witch, with the series logo

Publication information
- Publisher: Dupuis (French); Cinebook (English)
- Format: Ongoing series
- Genre: Graphic novel
- No. of issues: 27 (in French); 5 (in English)

Creative team
- Created by: Gilson & Clarke
- Written by: François Gilson (1 to 20); Clarke (since 21)
- Artist(s): Clarke (Frédéric Seron)

Mélusine is a Belgian comic strip created by artist Clarke and writer Gilson that features short, humorous stories that centre on the life of a young witch who lives as an au pair in a castle and studies at a witches’ school. The strip first appeared in Spirou magazine in 1992. Since 1995, her adventures have been published in book form by Dupuis—the 27th album came out in 2019. Five albums have been published in English by Cinebook.

== Characters ==
=== Castle inhabitants ===
Some of the main characters of the Mélusine comic series. From left to right: aunt Adrazelle on her broomstick; Mélisande the fairy; Count Gonzaga Hernyvanz the vampire; Mélusine; Winston the manservant; Professor Haaselblatt the teacher; and Duchess Aymee Döperzonn the ghost.

- Mélusine Anoukian is a beautiful and kind-hearted young witch with flaming red hair. In the first album, it is revealed that she is actually 119 years old. Although originally under the impression that she was hired to do magic, she lives as a sort of au pair in a sinister old castle. Outside of doing household chores, she is often performing spells and brewing potions. She also attends a witches' school where she is at the top of her class. However, she is hardly a teacher's pet since her spells work so well that they cause the teacher unexpected aggro, resulting in lessons being suspended: on one occasion, for example, the class had to materialize various objects from out of thin air. These ranged from flies to toads with marks ranging from 0 to 4 out of 10. Mélusine conjured up a huge monster which landed right on top of the teacher: she got a 10 and class was suspended.
- Count Gonzaga Hernyvanz and his wife, the Duchess Aymee Döperzonn, are the master and mistress of the castle where Mélusine works: a somewhat goofy male vampire and a stern female ghost. Mélusine always addresses them as "sir" and "madam", and their real names were only revealed in the eleventh album. Their manservant is called Winston and likes eating cats; he resembles both Lurch and Frankenstein's monster.
- Doctor Kartoffeln was first seen in the eleventh album. A descendant of the original owner of the castle, he claimed to be its rightful owner only to learn that his ancestor had gambled it away. However, Count Gonzaga Hernyvanz allowed him to stay since he could brew some very good tasting blood. Kartoffeln continues his scientific experiments and has been tampering with technology. He is particularly attached to Winston, as his great-grandfather was apparently the one who created him. Mélusine finds his mad scientific experiments disturbing, not to mention adding to her housework. School was therefore appealing since it enabled her to get away from him—until he was hired as a teacher.
- The mummy also lives in the castle. Although nothing more than a skeleton wrapped in bandages, he still has feelings, and is often caught peeping through the keyhole into Mélusine's room. He featured in the early strips but has not been used since.

=== Mélusine's relatives ===
- Adrazelle is Mélusine's nutty old aunt (542 years old, as is revealed in the third album). She lives in a shack somewhere in the neighborhood, and often visits her niece in the castle. She can also be seen speeding across the skies on her broomstick, wearing racing goggles, and seems to have a fondness for toad soup and sabbaths.
- Mélisande was first introduced in the seventh album. She is Mélusine's friendly but silly cousin and is not a witch but a fairy, and thus considered a disgrace to the family. She wears pink and blue and does nothing but conjure up bunnies, sweets and pastries with her magic wand, mumbling things like Bibbidi-Bobbidi-Boo (a reference to Cinderella's fairy godmother in the Disney version of the story). In volume 26, she is revealed to be Mélusine's sister, as their mother is in fact a fairy.
- Pirouline is Mélusine's half-sister, though, as Mélusine herself points out, it is more the reverse since Pirouline is twice her weight and age. Her heavy eating appears to be due to being a single mother—and when you consider the child...
- Malicella is Pirouline's daughter. She is 112 years old (12 in witches' terms) and is rebellious, unpleasant and troublesome. Mélusine finds herself stuck with her for awhile (see volume 15 L'Apprentie sorcière ("The Witch's Apprentice")) and goes through the difficulties of keeping her under control and teaching her magic. When she asks Malicella when her mother will take her back, she reveals that the last time she was entrusted to a third-party was over a period of four years! However, Pirouline soon re-appears and leaves with her progeny—much to the relief of Mélusine and her friends.

=== School ===
Mélusine attends a school for magic which was originally based in a small house in the woods. The premises got blown up as a result of Crancrelune's mishandling of dangerous mixtures. They thus moved to a castle which included a large library and more staff. To give even the hopeless Crancrelune the incentive to pass the exams, Haaselblatt, the teacher, announced that they would be held in the torture chamber.

- Cancrelune is Mélusine's incredibly clumsy and rather dim-witted best friend. Also a witch, she is frequently seen crashing into walls or windows on her broomstick, screwing up spells and potions, or panicking about examinations. What magic she can do successfully is the sleight of hand sort used by stage magicians. The comic strips of the thirteenth album focused, appropriately enough, around her many superstitious beliefs. Cancre-lune literally translates as "dunce-moon".
- Krapella is another student in Mélusine's class and her other best friend. Distinguishable by her somewhat risqué attire (black tube top, miniskirt, thigh-high fishnet stockings and pumps), she is the more outgoing, party-hardy of the group. Although quite competent herself, she does fall a little short of her more bookwormish friend. Always up for a bit of fun, she'll often be the first to forgo studies and drag her friends along with her to partake in various hijinks.
- Mister Haaselblatt is a teacher at the witches' school who was first introduced in the third album. He's small and chubby, and incredibly mean and demanding. He tends to insult his pupils, addressing them as "losers" or "morons", instead of encouraging them. He is often outsmarted by Mélusine, whose spells work so well that they result in chaos and school being suspended for the day—to the delight of Mélusine and the other students.
- Mister Purulóvskovar teaches the class about demonic forces. Muscular, but with an exceptionally ugly face, he looks particularly menacing even when he doesn't try to be and, when speaking, insects fall from his mouth. When he gets a cold, slimy creatures (slug, octopus) are expelled instead.
- Mister Charles Rimbaut teaches cooking. He is an ordinary-looking and quite friendly man, though, Mélusine finds him and his lessons dull and tedious since they have little to do with magic. They were the focus of the fourteenth album, La Cuisine du diable (French for "Hell's Kitchen").

=== Others ===
- The Werewolf is a very sophisticated character, who is very taken with Mélusine. He is probably the nearest she has to a boyfriend and she appreciates him, though, most of the time, she fantasizes being seduced by a handsome prince. The fact that he can only appear during a full moon makes him rather limited—especially since, in human form, he is a weak and pathetic little man and would rather she did not see him as such.
- Although many of the villagers occasionally turn to Mélusine for help—asking for love potions, hair-growing remedies and the like—there is also a group of people that are out to burn her at the stake. This group is led by the town's fanatical pastor, who's obsessed with putting a stop to witchcraft, but never succeeds.

== Albums ==
1. Sortilèges (Spells, 1995)
2. Le bal des vampires (The Vampires' Ball, 1996)
3. Inferno (1996)
4. Histoire à lire au coin du feu (Story to be Read by the Fire, 1997)
5. Philtres d'amour (Love Potions, 1998)
6. Farfadets et korrigans (Imps and Elves, 1999)
7. Hocus pocus (2000)
8. Halloween (2001)
9. Hypnosis (2001)
10. Contes de la pleine lune (Tales of the Full Moon, 2002)
11. Mélusine à l'école des maléfices (Mélusine and the School of Witchcraft, 2003)
12. La belle et la bête (Beauty and the Beast, 2004)
13. Superstitions (2005)
14. La cuisine du diable (The Devil's Kitchen, 2006)
15. L'Apprentie Sorcière (The Witch's Apprentice, 2007)
16. Ballet enchantée (Enchanted Ballet, 2008)
17. Sang pour Sang (Blood for Blood, 2009) (a pun on the French term for 100%)
18. Malédiction! (Curse!, 2010)
19. L'élixir de jouvence (The Elixir of Youth, 2011)
20. Envoûtement (Bewitchment, 2012)
21. Le Tournoi de magie (The Magic Tournament, 2013)
22. Cancrelune (2014)
23. Fées contre sorciers (Fairies Against Witches, 2015)
24. La ville fantome (The Ghost Town, 2016)
25. L'année du dragon (The Year of the Dragon, 2017)
26. En rose et noir (In Pink and Black, 2018)
27. La guerre sans magie (The War Without Magic, 2019)

== English translations ==
The series has been translated into English by Cinebook Ltd, a British publisher specializing in Franco-Belgian comics. So far, five books have been translated.

1. Hocus Pocus, Feb 2007, ISBN 978-1-905460-20-5
2. Halloween, Oct 2007, ISBN 978-1-905460-34-2
3. The Vampires' Ball, Oct 2008, ISBN 978-1-905460-69-4
4. Love Potions, Oct 2009, ISBN 978-1-84918-005-4
5. Tales of the Full Moon, Sept 2014, ISBN 978-1-84918-212-6
