= Het Goudblommeke in Papier =

Historic café/brasserie in Brussels, Belgium

- Het Goudblommeke in Papier (Dutch); La Fleur en Papier doré (French)
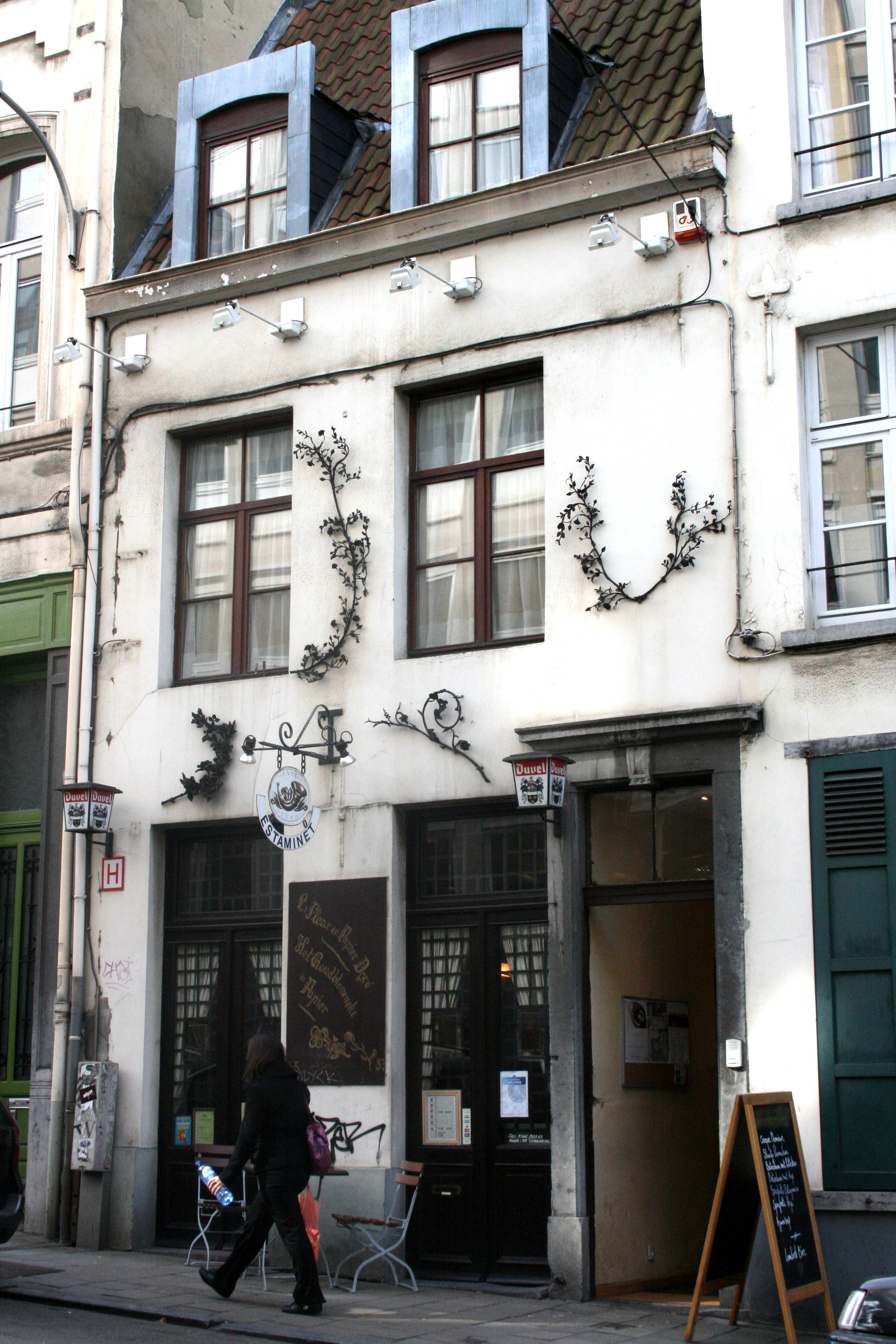
- Het Goudblommeke in Papier

General information
- Type: Café/brasserie
- Location: Rue des Alexiens / Cellebroersstraat 53–55, 1000 City of Brussels, Brussels-Capital Region, Belgium
- Coordinates: 50°50′34″N 4°21′3″E

Website
- goudblommekeinpapier.be

Het Goudblommeke in Papier (Dutch, pronounced [ət ˈɣʌudˌblɔməkə ɪm paːˈpiːr], lit. 'The Paper Marigold') or La Fleur en Papier doré (French, pronounced [la flœʁ ɑ̃ papje dɔʁe], lit. 'The Gilt-Paper Flower') is a historic café/brasserie located at 53–55, rue des Alexiens/Cellebroersstraat in Brussels, Belgium. Established in 1944, it is the oldest establishment of its kind still in operation in the City of Brussels, and the second oldest in the Brussels-Capital Region. It is known in particular for having been an important venue in Brussels' cultural life, acting as a hub for surrealist artists and the CoBrA movement.

== History ==
The café occupies one of the few small 17th-century houses to have survived the bombardment of Brussels of 1695. It was partly refurbished after 1830 by the architect Henri Partoes. According to a memorial plaque on the facade, the house belonged from 1843 to the Sisters of Charity of Saint Vincent de Paul.

At the beginning of the 20th century, an artistic cabaret, the Café des Artistes, opened there, and became a meeting place for surrealist painters and writers from the 1920s onwards. In October 1944, the anarchist poet and gallery owner Gérard (Geert) van Bruaene founded the current café with his partner Marie-Jeanne Cleren. The painter René Magritte, the novelist Louis Paul Boon, and the cartoonist Hergé were all at one time regulars. It was also a meeting place for artists in the CoBrA avant-garde movement such as Christian Dotremont and Pierre Alechinsky, and in 1955, the writer Hugo Claus held his wedding reception there.

Even after Van Bruaene's death in 1964, the Goudblommeke remained a cultural meeting point. The café was registered as a protected monument in 1997. The building is owned by the Public Centre for Social Welfare of the City of Brussels, and partially sublet by AB InBev to the association that runs the café. The café, which went bankrupt in 2006, was taken over by a group of friends who set up a limited liability cooperative company, and reopened on 12 October 2007 after a year of restoration and renovation. In January 2021, it was reported that the COVID-19 pandemic in Belgium had left the business's future precarious, which resulted in another bankruptcy in 2022. As of May 2023, the café has once again reopened with a new manager.

== Interior decoration ==
The walls of the café are covered with 418 works, photographs, texts and objects brought together by Van Bruaene, as well as aphorisms written in his own hand on the wall. The café and its decor have been protected since 1997, and the decoration, documented in its then-state, therefore cannot be modified.

Since May 2011, the café's interior courtyard has displayed a comic strip mural by the cartoonists De Marck and De Wulf (Stam & Pilou). When the new manager took over in 2022, the mural, deemed sexist, was kept but hidden behind a curtain and visible on request.

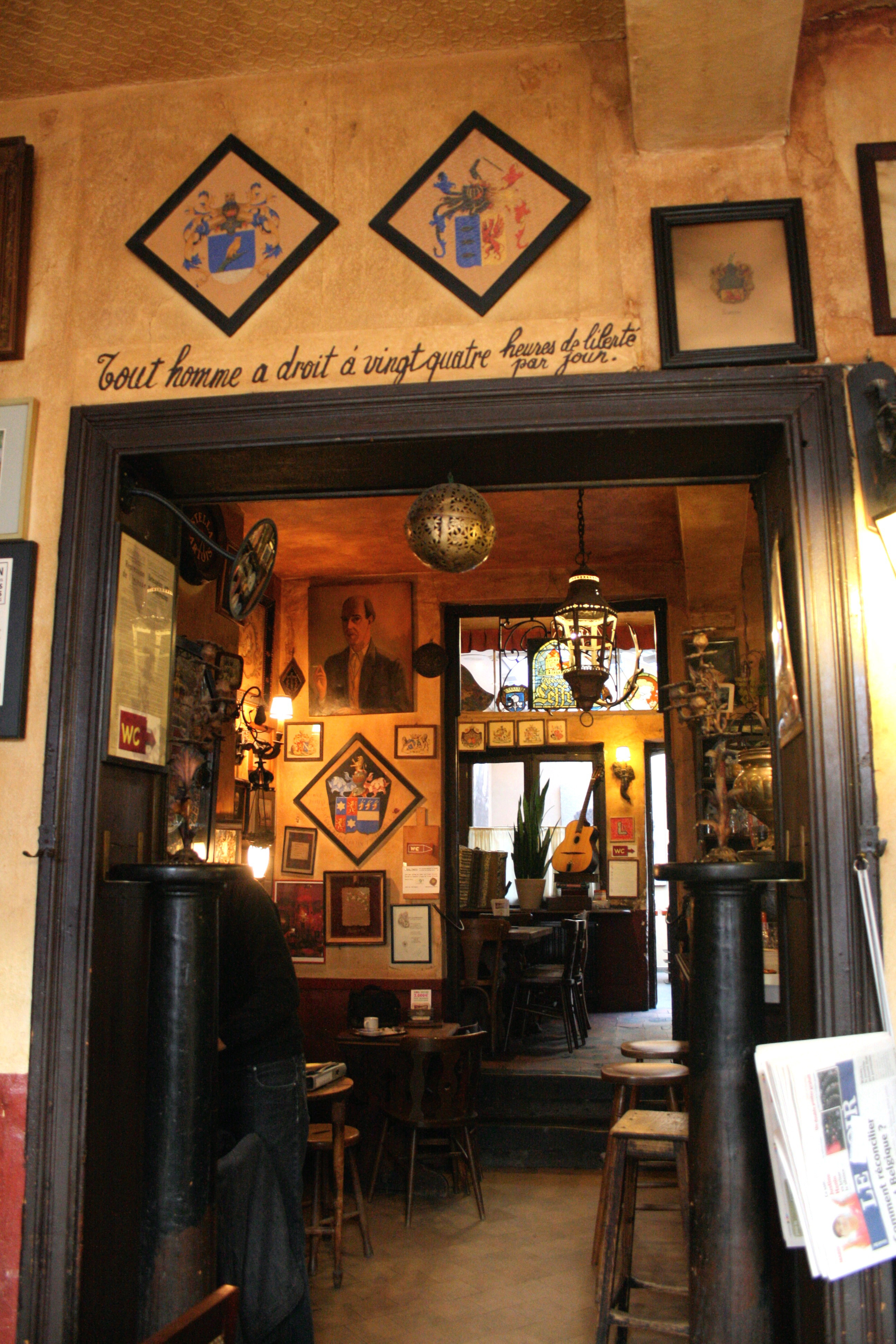
Interior

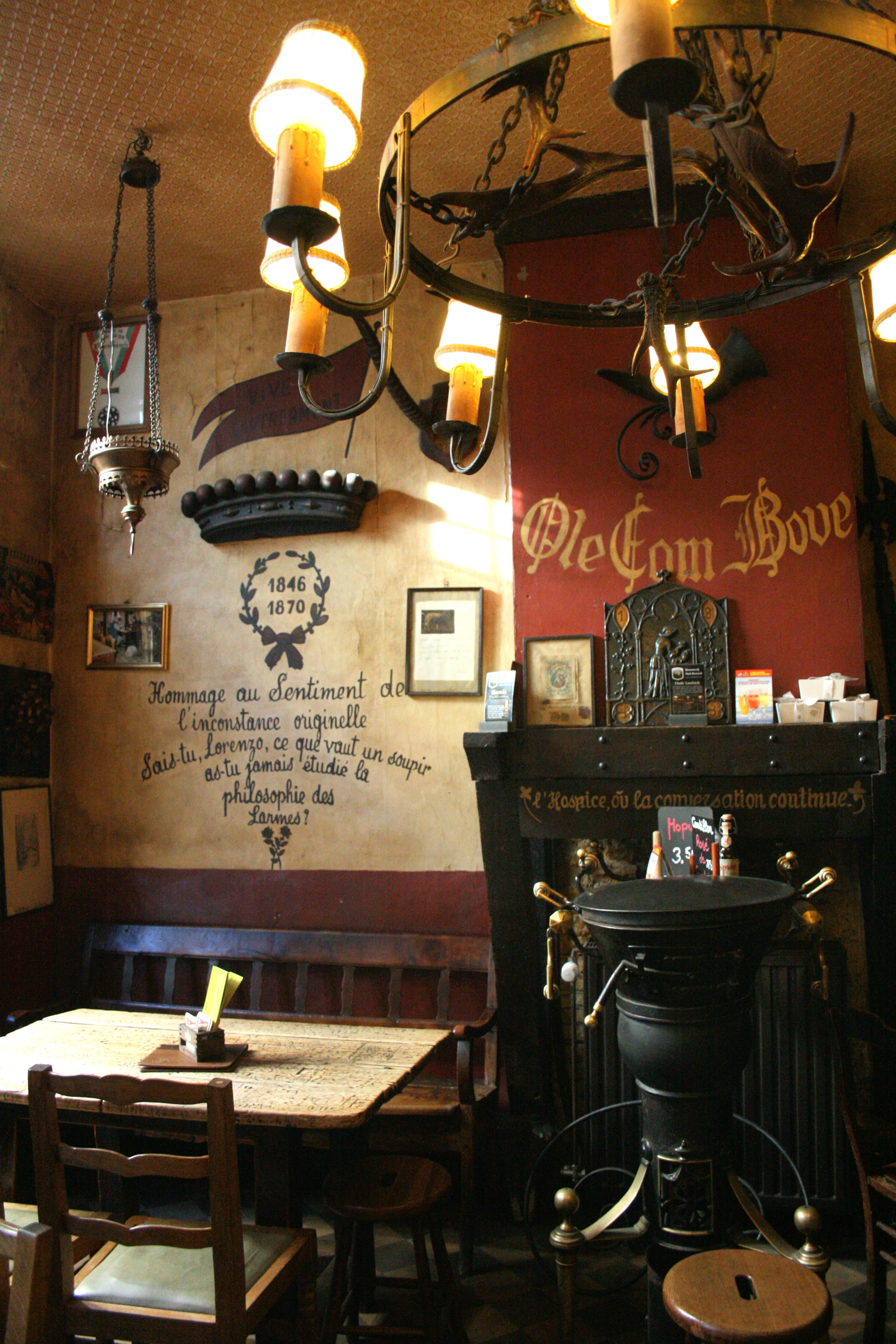
Interior, with aphorisms

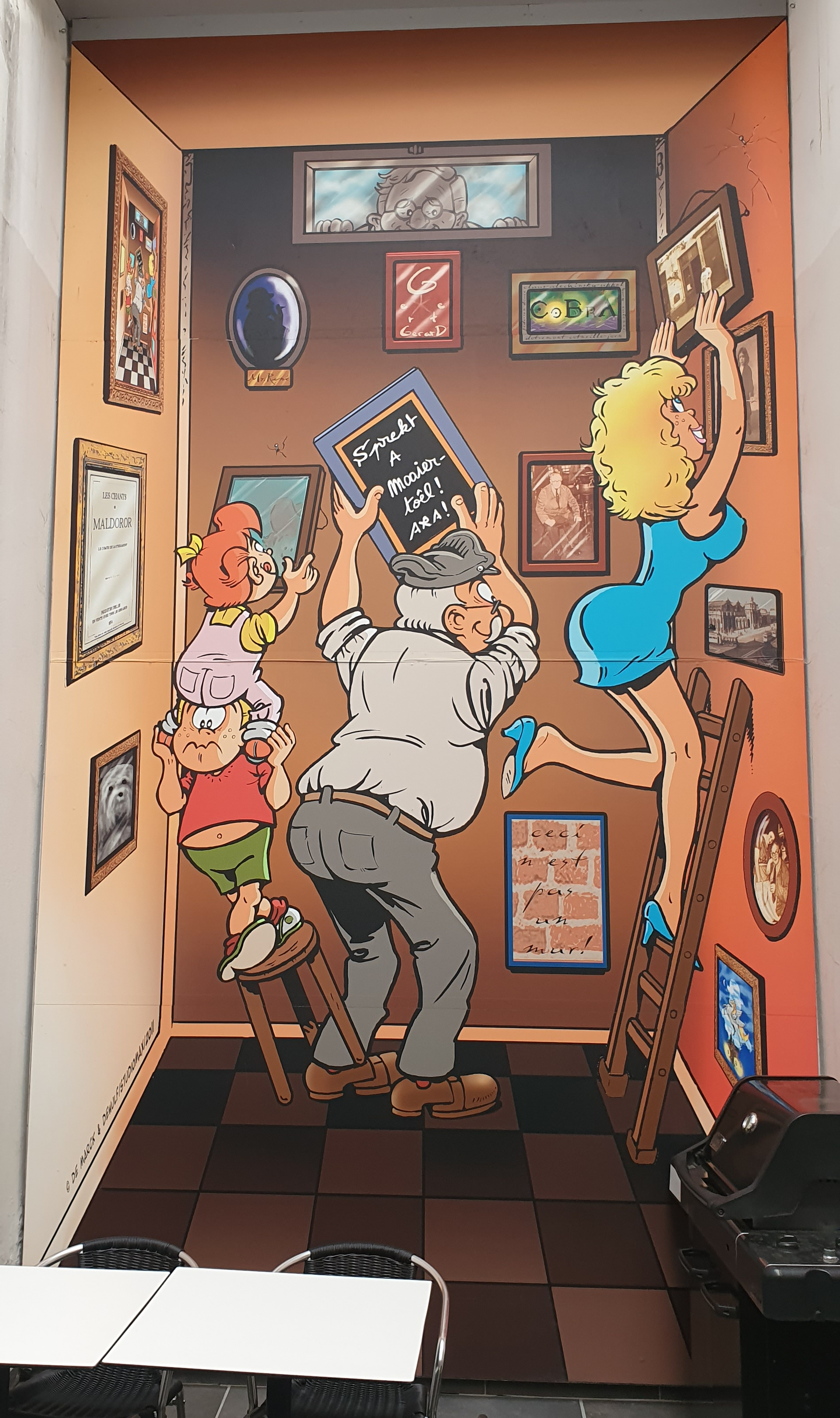
Stam & Pilou mural

== See also ==
- History of Brussels
- Culture of Belgium
- Belgium in the long nineteenth century
