= Marcel Denis =

Belgian comics artist

- Born: 15 February 1923 Monceau-sur-Sambre, Belgium
- Died: 18 March 2002 (aged 79) Lobbes, Belgium
- Areas: Writer, Artist
- Notable works: Tif et Tondu, Hultrasson

Marcel Denis (15 February 1923 – 18 March 2002) was a French-speaking Belgian comics creator. He was the creator of the series Hultrasson and Les Frères Clips in Spirou magazine. He also made two episodes of Tif et Tondu. He was a part of the so-called Marcinelle School, influenced by Jijé and André Franquin.

== Biography ==
=== Early life ===
Marcel Denis was born in Monceau-sur-Sambre in 1923. He studied drawing and painting in a private school in Monceau-sur-Sambre after he finished his secondary studies. Afterwards, during the Second World War, he started working in an office while creating comics in his free time.

=== Debut ===
Marcel Denis made his comics debut aged 17 in 1940 in Le Petit Vingtième with the scout story Pip. In 1947, he published Les Aventures du Professeur Vianrose for the weekly magazine L'Optimiste, and at the same time Les Aventures de Jim et Bill Blutterson détectives in Excelsior, a supplement to the magazine La Défense sociale. This series ran for three episodes: La Poudre silencieuse, La Fusée and Le Secret du Fellah.

From 1944 until 1952, he also created numerous illustrations for Belgian newspapers and magazines, including Le Moustique, Le Soir, Plein Jeu, La Libre Belgique and Pourquoi Pas?.

=== Working for Dupuis ===
Marcel Denis started working for Dupuis in 1952 as a letterer. His work was mainly the reletterring of comics for Robbedoes, the Dutch translated version of the weekly comics magazine Spirou. Starting in 1954, he also contributed to the different publications of Dupuis as a layouter and illustrator in the artistic studio created by the artistic director Maurice Rosy, where he worked alongside Degotte, Deliège, Lambil, Jamic and Salvérius. Salvérius, the future artist for Les Tuniques bleues with Raoul Cauvin, had been hired by Dupuis thanks to Marcel Denis.

=== In Franquin's atelier ===
In 1957, when André Franquin started with a small atelier in Brussels, he was introduced thanks to Jidéhem, already a contributor of Franquin. Together with colorist Jean Verbruggen, the four of them formed the atelier. Marcel Denis left one year later and was replaced by Jean Roba.

In 1957 he wrote two short stories of Spirou et Fantasio, drawn by Franquin and Jidéhem: Le Marsupilami passe l'éponge (renamed Fantasio et le siphon in the album La voix sans maître et 5 autres aventures) appeared in the first issue of Spirou poche, and Les Patins téléguidés (renamed Fantasio et les patins téléguidés in Fantasio et le fantôme et 4 autres aventures), which was made for the second issue of Spirou poche, which never appeared.

In 1957, young comics artist Jo-El Azara came to Franquin looking for some advice on getting a break into the industry. Franquin gave him the idea of a group of kids called La Ribambelle, with the character of a young black trumpet player called Dizzy, named after Dizzy Gillespie. Marcel Denis wrote the four-page story Opération ciseaux, published in Spirou in 1958. (Note: Spirou n°1041, 27 March 1958.) The series was abandoned until 1962 when Jean Roba restarted it.

In 1959, Marcel Denis returned to the atelier of Franquin to collaborate on a collective story, L'Île au Boumptéryx, (Note: Spirou from n°1092 until n°1095 (1959), reprinted in n°1823 (1973).) created for a special Easter issue of Spirou magazine. The basic idea of a bird with explosive eggs was Franquin's, and the story is written by Denis and Franquin together, with art by Jidéhem and Roba.

=== Les Frères Clips and the micro-stories ===
In 1958, when Denis had left the Franquin atelier, he created Les Frères Clips, a series of gag pages and short stories, his first comics for Spirou magazine. Seven later stories are published as micro-stories, a series of miniature booklets published in the middle of the magazine. He continued the series until 1969.. It told the story of two inventors, Jules and Jonas, whose well-intended ideas often result in catastrophes when presented to their boss, minister Beaussillon. (Note: (image) (in French) Un gag des Frères Clips.)

Marcel Denis created nine other micro-stories between 1960 and 1964, including two stories about Professor Bouton (Les Ennuis du Professeur Bouton and Échec à la bombe), and one micro-story created together with Marcel Remacle : Les Blaireaux sont fatigués.

=== Tif et Tondu ===
In 1958, Will, the artist of the long-running strip Tif et Tondu, left Spirou to work for the rival Tintin magazine.

In 1960, Maurice Rosy, writer of Tif et Tondu and artistic director of Spirou, suggested that Denis should take over the illustrating of the strip. Denis made two episodes of the series, Tif et Tondu à Hollywood in 1960 and Ne tirez pas sur Hippocampe! in 1961. Plans to publish these stories as albums were eventually dropped, despite Denis creating a cover drawing for the first one already. Denis even started a third episode, Les Saucisses du Docteur Snoss, but this was finally rejected by Dupuis. Meanwhile, Will returned to Spirou at the end of 1960 after stopping his work at Tintin as artistic director and resumed work on Tif et Tondu in 1964.

Denis' Tif et Tondu à Hollywood was finally published as an album in 1983, and Ne tirez pas sur Hippocampe! was released in 2008 — a limited edition in both cases.

=== Collaboration with Marcel Remacle ===
After a first micro-story together in 1963, Marcel Denis created the series ‘’Hultrasson’’with Marcel Remacle in 1964. He also contributed to two scenarios for Remacle’s series ‘'Le Vieux Nick’’.

Hultrasson is a Viking beer salesman whose main other activity is to prevent the stupid Sépadeffasson taking the throne of king Harald-les-beaux-cheveux. (Note: (image) (in French) Première planche de la série Hultrasson.)

Marcel Denis wrote the first three long stories published in ‘’Spirou’’: Fais moi peur Viking! in 1964, Hultrasson chez les Scots in 1965 and Hultrasson perd le nord in 1966. When finishing the inking of this story, the two auteurs temporarily halted their collaboration after an argument.

Marcel Denis then created on his own a short story of six pages, Les Vikings aux champs, (Note: ’’Spirou’’ n° 1519, 25 May 1967) in 1967. The series was continued in 1973 by Vittorio Leonardo (art) and Maurice Tillieux (story).

In 1966, Denis and Remacle created a spin-off from ‘’Hultrasson’’, centered on the character Sépadeffasson, with two six page stories: Le Bâton des métamorphoses (Note: ’’Spirou’’ n° 1458, 24 March 1966) and Samson le Rouge. (Note: ’’Spirou’’ n° 1478, 11 August 1966)

In 1968, Remacle asked the assistance of Denis for the scenario of his main series ‘’Le Vieux Nick’’. Together, they created the long story Les Commandos du Roy and in 1969 the six page story Sus à la baleine !. (Note: ’’ Spirou’’ n° 1632, 24 July 1969) Another long story, Barbe-Noire aubergiste, followed in 1970, before their final collaboration, the 1971 six-page story Un Coup dans le buffet. (Note: ’’Spirou’’ n° 1719, 25 March 1971) This was the final comic authored by Denis.

=== Declining years ===
After a second and final row with Marcel Remacle and serious health problems, Denis left the comics field in 1971 to get a more steady job with a printer. He returned to drawing and painting at the end of his life, entering the Academy when he was over 70. He died aged 79 in Lobbes.

== Published works ==
=== In newspapers and magazines ===
- Pip, in Le Petit Vingtième, weekly supplement to the newspaper Vingtième Siècle, 1940.
- Les Aventures du Professeur Vianrose, in L'Optimiste, 1947.
- Les Aventures de Jim et Bill Blutterson détectives (et du Professeur Perkins), in Excelsior, supplement to La Défense sociale :
1. La Poudre silencieuse, 1947.
2. La Fusée, 1947.
3. Le Secret du Fellah, 1947.
- Spirou et Fantasio : ‘’Le Marsupilami passe l'éponge’’ (scenario), with Jidéhem and Franquin (art), in Spirou poche n°1, 1957 (republished in Spirou magazine in 1997).
- Krafty (art), with Octave Joly (scenario), commercial page for the Kraft Velveta cheese, in Spirou poche n°1, 1957
- 6 short stories of Les Frères Clips, in Spirou, 1958-1966
- ’’La Ribambelle’’: ‘’Opération ciseaux’’ (scenario), with Jo-El Azara, in Spirou, 1958
- ’’L'Île au Boumptéryx’’, with Roba, Franquin and Jidéhem, in Spirou, 1959. Republished there in 1973.
- Tif et Tondu, in Spirou :
1. Tif et Tondu à Hollywood, 1960
2. Ne tirez pas sur Hippocampe!, 1961
- 9 micro-stories in Spirou: (Note: The number given is the numbering of the micro-stories library.)

17. Professeur Bouton : Les Ennuis du Professeur Bouton, 1960.
28. Professeur Bouton : Échec à la bombe, 1960.
104. La Carpette ensorcelée, 1962.
118. Le Microgloup 15, 1962.
125. Le Canon de Nazarone, 1962.
157. Patates, Humour... et Fantaisie, 1963.
191. Une Vache dans le cosmos, 1963.
197. Les Blaireaux sont fatigués (art) with Marcel Remacle (scenario), 1963.
227. Le Calepin du major Johnson, 1964.

- Hultrasson (scenario), with Marcel Remacle (art), in Spirou :
1. Fais moi peur Viking!, 1964.
2. Hultrasson chez les Scots, 1965.
3. Hultrasson perd le nord, 1966-1967.

- ’’Les Vikings aux champs’’ (art and scenario), 1967

- 2 short stories of Sépadeffason le Viking, in Spirou, 1966
- Les Frères Clips (micro-stories), in Spirou :

307. La Bulla-clipsette, 1966.
356. Le Bœuf ou moi!..., 1967.
371. Feu vert pour les couleurs !, 1967.
385. La Guerre secrète de la saucisse, 1967.
453. Le Zénobiac, 1969.
462. Jules II le robot, 1969.
479. Le Grand Prix du Banalquivir, 1969.

- A number of short stories in ‘’Spirou’’, 1966.
- Vieux Nick (scenario), with Marcel Remacle (art), Dupuis :

- Les Commandos du Roy, 1968.
- « Sus à la baleine ! », 1969.
- Barbe-Noire aubergiste, 1970.
- « Un coup dans le buffet », 1971.

- A gag for Poussy, with Peyo (art), in Spirou, 1968.
- Spirou et Fantasio : ‘’Fantasio et les patins téléguidés’’ (scenario), with Jidéhem and Franquin (art), in Spirou, 2006. First publication of a story initially intended for Spirou poche n°2.

=== In albums ===
- Les Aventures de Jim et Bill Blutterson détectives : La Poudre silencieuse, Excelsior, 1948
- Hultrasson (scenario), with Marcel Remacle (art), Dupuis :
1. Fais moi peur Viking!, 1965
2. Hultrasson chez les Scots, 1966
3. Hultrasson perd le nord, 1968
- Vieux Nick (scenario, not credited), with Marcel Remacle (art), Dupuis :

14. Les Commandos du Roy, 1969
15. Barbe-Noire aubergiste, 1971

- Tif et Tondu, Albino :

3.Tif et Tondu à Hollywood, 1983

- Spirou et Fantasio hors-série, Dupuis :

3. La Voix sans maître et 5 autres aventures : « Fantasio et le siphon » (scenario), with Jidéhem and Franquin (art), 2003
4. Fantasio et le fantôme et 4 autres aventures : « Fantasio et les patins téléguidés » (scenario), with Jidéhem and Franquin (art), 2003
- Republished in l'Intégrale Spirou et Fantasio n° 5, Mystérieuses créatures, 2008

- Tif et Tondu, La Vache qui médite :
1. Tif et Tondu à Hollywood, 2007
2. Ne tirez pas sur Hippocampe!, 2008
