= Pierre Seron =

Belgian comics artist (1942–2017)

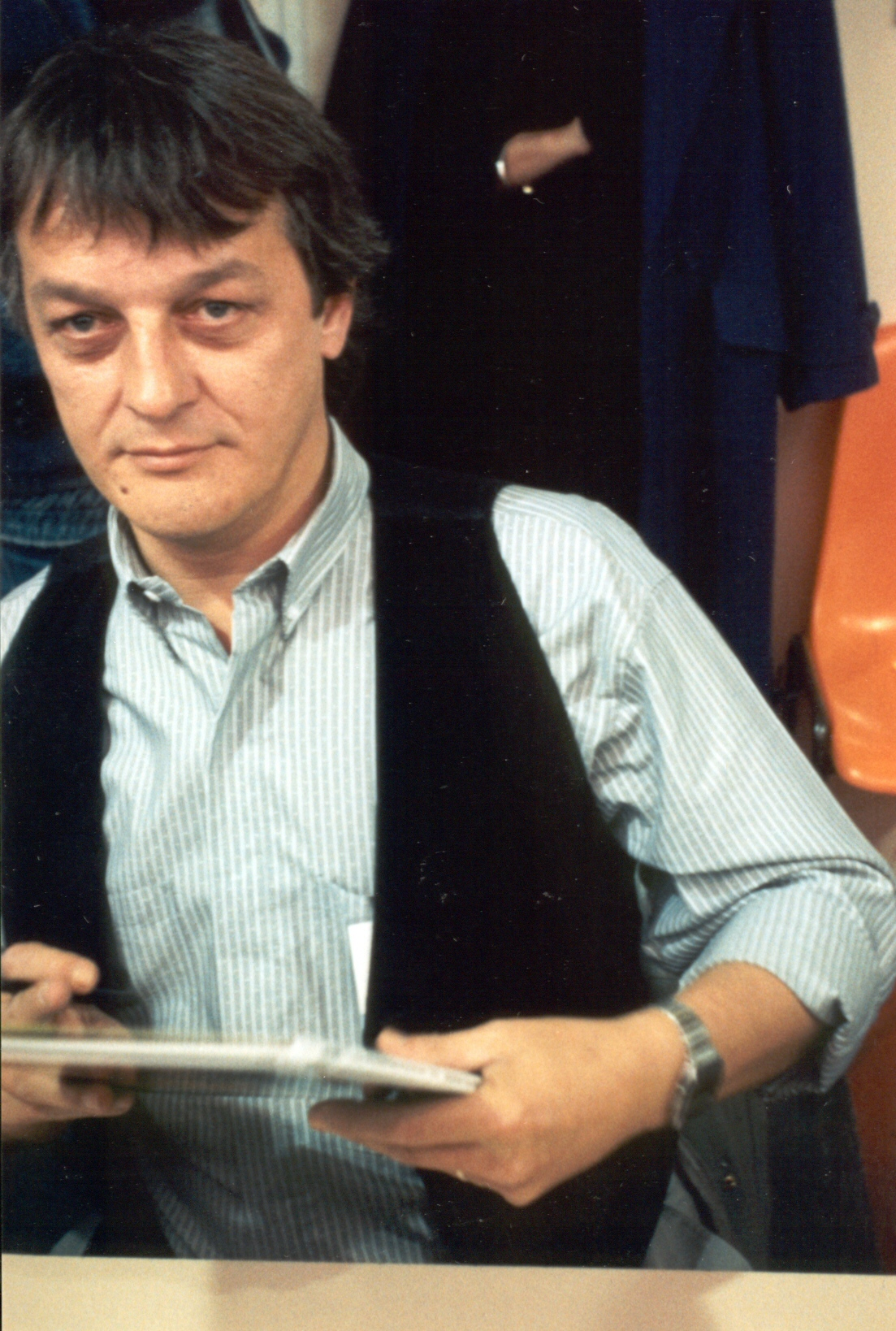
- Pierre Seron, January 1990, Angoulême international comics festival
- Born: 9 February 1942 Chênée, Belgium
- Died: 24 May 2017 (aged 75)
- Areas: artist, writer
- Pseudonym: Foal
- Notable works: Les Petits hommes Les Centaures

Pierre Seron (9 February 1942 – 24 May 2017) was a Belgian comic book artist, most famous for his comic series Les Petits Hommes.

== Biography ==
He spent the first few years of his life in Liège then followed the work transfers of his father, an engineer, to Montreal, Quebec, Canada, Libourne, France, the Bordeaux region, Givet in the Ardennes region and then returned to Liège, where Seron began his studies at the Saint-Luc school.

Seron started in the comics industry as an assistant designer to Dino Attanasio and Mittéï under the pseudonym Foal, working on series such as André Franquin's Modeste et Pompon. Launching his own work, the series Les Petits Hommes (The Little Men), initially in collaboration with journalist Albert Despréchins, began serial publication in Spirou magazine on 7 September 1967, a run continuing into 2004. Revisiting the pseudonym Fohal, he created the series La Famille Fohal which was published in Pif gadget from 1973 to 1976, later published in albums under the name La Famille Martin. His series Aurore et Ulysse (alternately known as Les Centaures) started serial publication on 23 June 1977, also in Spirou.

Prior to his death, Seron lived in the south of France, near Nîmes, where he continued to work on his series, adding the erotic series Les Petites Femmes (The Little Women) aimed at the adult market.

His nephew Frédéric Seron is also a comics author. Signing his work "Clarke", he is best known for writing Mélusine.

== Partial bibliography ==
- Les Petits hommes, 44 albums (1972–2010) ("The Little Men") – the adventures of a Lilliput-like community of little people, but set in modern times.
- La famille Fohal (1973–1976) ("The Fohal Family") – the adventures of the Fohal family
- Les Centaures, 6 albums (1982–1989) ("The Centaurs") – the stories of a centaur couple in a mythical world.
- La Famille Martin, 2 albums (1990–1993) ("The Martin Family") – book collection of La famille Fohal
- Les Petites femmes, 6 albums (1999–2009) ("The Little Women") – small, pygmie-sized women who live on a tropical island – for adult readers!
