= Maurice Tillieux =

Belgian writer and comic artist

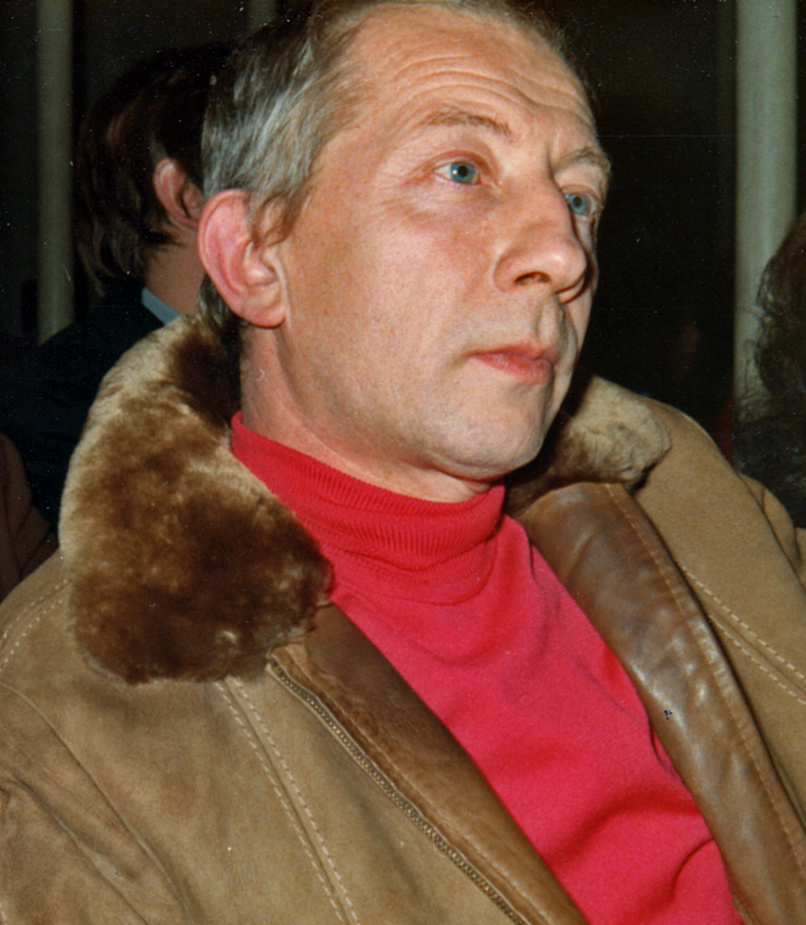
- Tillieux in 1974
- Born: 7 August 1921 Huy, Belgium
- Died: 2 February 1978 (aged 56) Tours, France
- Areas: artist, writer
- Notable works: Félix; Gil Jourdan; Marc Lebut; Tif et Tondu

Maurice Tillieux (7 August 1921 – 2 February 1978) was a Belgian writer and comic artist. He is regarded by many as a major figure of post-war Belgian comics.

== Early life ==
Maurice Tillieux was born in Huy in 1921. At first he studied for the merchant navy, but his career prospects were sunk following the German invasion of Belgium in 1940. He claims that while waiting at Bordeaux for a ship that was to take him and his fellow students to South America, a Stuka dive-bomber attacked another ship, forcing Tillieux's to turn round and Tillieux to go home.

He turned to writing and his first novel Le navire qui tue ses capitaines (The Ship that Kills its Captains) was published in 1943. Many of his stories would be set at sea or in the docks where his early ambitions may have developed. Two other novels are supposed to have been written at this time, but there seems to be some confusion as to whether or not they were actually published.

Tillieux had already done some work as an artist. He contributed to various weekly and monthly comics as artist and writer, often signing his work with a variety of English pseudonyms.

== Career ==
It was in the weekly comic Heroïc-Albums, which started in 1947, that he developed his style and proved himself a master of detective stories loaded with humour and atmosphere. Heroïc-Albums's main appeal was that each issue contained complete stories rather than a number of episodes spread over weekly or monthly instalments.

Tillieux's most notable contribution was Félix, the adventures of a glasses-wearing reporter who travelled the world accompanied by two sidekicks called Allume-Gaz (French for gas lighter) and Inspector Cabarez of the Chilean police. Like most comic strip reporters, Félix spent most of his time fighting crooks and spies rather than simply reporting about them.

Street scene from Gil Jourdan's first adventure

Heroïc-Albums ceased publication in 1956, and Tillieux introduced his most famous character, Gil Jourdan, in Spirou magazine, where he had already worked as an illustrator since 1940. Jourdan was very similar to Félix, though he had clear vision and was an actual PI. Like Félix, he was also flanked by two sidekicks, including a police contact, both of whom provided most of the comic relief which contrasted to the earnest nature of the title character. Some of Félix's stories were the basis for some of Jourdan's adventures.

One major innovation of the Jourdan series was the atmosphere of the places where he would go to. Whereas previous series like The Adventures of Tintin were based in spotlessly clean homes and locations, Jordan's world was made up of dusty offices, littered streets, wet docks and mud-splattered farms.

In later years Tillieux, like many leading figures in the field, stuck to writing while leaving most of the artwork to others. Gos took over the drawing of Gil Jourdan and Tillieux also contributed to other series such as Tif et Tondu and Yoko Tsuno. Another major detective series was Jess Long, the adventures of an FBI agent, which were drawn by Arthur Piroton in a more realistic style.

Tillieux enjoyed action as well as humour and mystery, and many of his strips feature elaborate fights and car chases. On 31 January 1978, while returning from the annual Angoulême International Comics Festival, he was fatally injured in a car crash near Tours, and died two days later on 2 February.

== Humour ==
Tillieux's Gil Jourdan in a typical situation

Humour was an important element of Tillieux's work even in his detective stories. At their best Félix and Gil Jourdan could provide good laughs as well as good adventures and mysteries.

Tillieux therefore also wrote non-detective series with the emphasis on humour. One example was César, a domestic comic strip in which the titled protagonist lives next door to a policeman. Many of the strips involve César babysitting his neighbour's little daughter. Mayhem ensues and, as a reward for his trouble, César ends up being fined by the little girl's father.

Marc Lebut, drawn by Francis, are the adventures of the young owner of a Ford T car who is the bane of his long-suffering neighbour. Lebut is always dragging the poor Mister Goular into all sorts of crazy adventures and dismissing all pleas not to get involved in Mister Goular's own problems. Lebut has a way of making Mister Goular responsible when things go wrong and getting the glory for himself when they go right. He could be described as a pesky anti-hero along the lines of Jolyon Wagg from the adventures of Tintin.

There was also Hultrasson (a pun on the French for ultrasound), which was drawn by Leonardo Vittorio and based in an Hägar the Horrible-like world of Vikings.

Tillieux also contributed a couple of storylines to La Ribambelle, the stories of a multi-racial gang of kids, drawn by Jean Roba and the classic series Tif et Tondu.

== Legacy ==
Maurice Tillieux has been described as a "master of surprise, sarcasm and nonsense".
