= Joseph Loeckx =

Belgian comic book artist (1937–2023)

Jo-El Azara
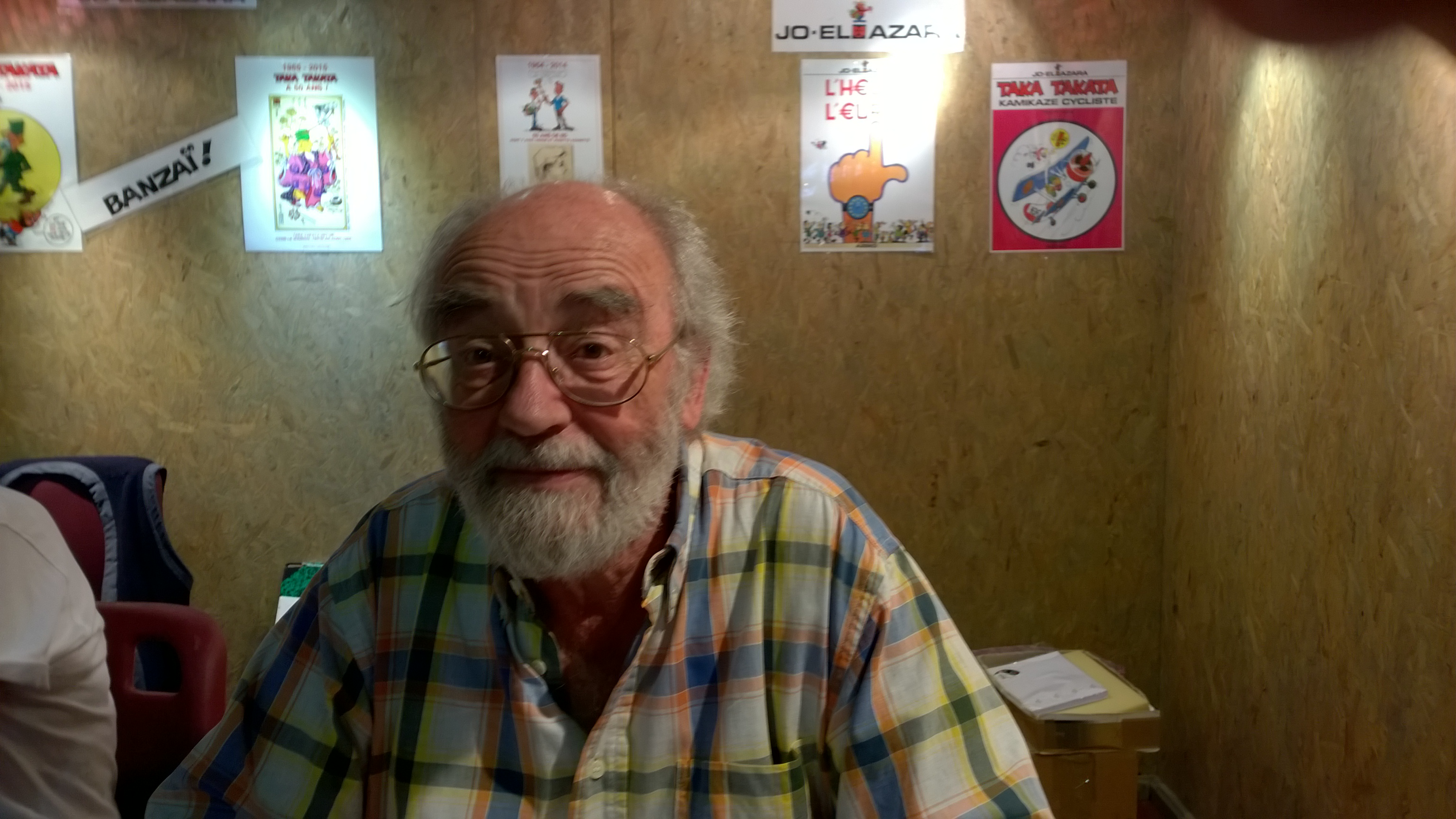
- Loeckx in 2015
- Born: Joseph Franz Hedwig Loeckx; 4 May 1937 Drogenbos, Belgium
- Died: 7 February 2023 (aged 85) Montégut, Gers, France
- Area: Artist
- Pseudonyms: Jo-El, Ernest
- Notable works: Taka Takata

Joseph Franz Hedwig Loeckx (4 May 1937 – 7 February 2023) was a Belgian comic book artist. He worked under the pseudonym of Jo-El Azara. Important series he worked on include Clifton and Taka Takata, both serialized in Tintin.

== Biography ==
Loeckx was born in Drogenbos, Flemish Brabant, near Brussels, Belgium, on 4 May 1937.

Loeckx is sometimes referred to as Joseph-R. Loeckx in error. During his working life, first he used the penname of Jo-El, subsequently Ernest, and thereafter worked as Jo-El Azara, under which name he has drawn most of his comics.

During a long career working with prominent figures in Belgian and French comics, including Hergé, Macherot, and Uderzo, he was active in publishing his own Taka Takata albums under his Azéko label.

Loeckx lived in the south of France, close to the Pyrenees. His lifelong partner, Josette Baujot, died on 13 August 2009. He died on 7 February 2023, at the age of 85.
