= Prix Saint-Michel =

Comics awards presented by the City of Brussels

- Awarded for: Achievements in the field of Franco-Belgian comics
- Sponsored by: (1971–1986) City of Brussels (2002–2019) 9e Art - BD
- Country: Belgium
- First award: 1971
- Final award: 2019

The Prix Saint-Michel (French pronunciation: [pʁi sɛ̃ miʃɛl]) was a series of comic awards presented in the City of Brussels from 1971 to 2019 (with a gap from 1987 to 2001), specifically recognizing excellence in Franco-Belgian comics. The festival awarded several prizes, the most prestigious of which was the "Grand Prix Saint-Michel," honoring lifetime achievement. After its revival in 2002 under new management, the prize continued until 2019, recognizing both outstanding work and the broader cultural significance of Franco-Belgian comics.

== History ==
=== First phase (1971–1986) ===
The Prix Saint-Michel was established in 1971 by André Leborgne (1928–2012), a Belgian comics critic and promoter who had been active in comics fandom since the mid-1960s. (Note: Before founding the Prix Saint-Michel, Leborgne created the Cercle des Amis des Bandes Dessinées (C.A.B.D.) and the fanzine Ran Tan Plan, one of the earliest Belgian journals devoted to comics scholarship. Leborgne also served as a member of the first jury of the Angoulême International Comics Festival (1974), underscoring his central role in the emergence of European comics festivals and prizes.) Sponsored by the City of Brussels, the Prix Saint-Michel was first presented at the Brussels Book Fair, with the inaugural Grand Prix Saint-Michel awarded to Edgar P. Jacobs. It was the first major distinction specifically devoted to Franco-Belgian comics. (Note: Although often said to be the oldest European comics awards, during its existence the Prix Saint-Michel was actually the second oldest comics award in Europe still being presented, behind the Adamson Awards (which originated in 1965).)

During this first period, the prize quickly gained prestige within the Belgian bande dessinée community, honoring major creators such as Hergé, Morris, Jijé, Cosey, Didier Comès, and Bernard Hislaire, and encompassing multiple categories that celebrated both lifetime achievement and notable works from the year, including artistic style, writing, illustration, and efforts to promote comics as a cultural form.

The prize went dormant after 1986, a pause attributed to the growing prominence of newer, more publicized comics awards in France, Switzerland, and Québec, many of which benefited from greater media attention and public funding.

=== Second phase (2002–2019) ===
In an attempt to restoring its historical prestige, the Prix Saint-Michel was revived in 2002 under the auspices of the Brussels-Capital Region Comics Festival, organized by the ASBL 9e Art - BD. The new organizers streamlined the number of categories to better highlight artistic merit and the year’s most notable works, while maintaining the Grand Prix Saint-Michel for an author’s entire career. Later laureates included Hermann, Grzegorz Rosiński, Gotlib, Jean Van Hamme, Philippe Geluck, Milo Manara, and Philippe Berthet.

== Jury and organization ==
Throughout its existence, the Prix Saint-Michel was adjudicated by a jury of professionals from across the comics industry, including publishers, artists, editors, and booksellers. The committee met several times each year to assess trends in the bande dessinée field and to select laureates. The award’s guiding goals were to honor the body of work of established creators and to encourage emerging talent within the Franco-Belgian comics tradition.

== Categories and structure ==
The structure and categories of the Prix Saint-Michel evolved significantly since the award’s creation. The prize’s history can be divided into two broad phases: the early period of the 1970s–1980s, marked by a large number of specialized distinctions, and the post-2002 revival, when the award was reorganized and standardized under the Brussels-Capital Region Comics Festival.

=== 1970s–1980s ===
During its first decade, the Prix Saint-Michel featured a wide range of categories recognizing both artistic and writing achievements across different genres. The 1971 edition, for example, included distinctions for Best Realistic Artwork, Best Comical Artwork, Best Science-Fiction Artwork, Best European Artist, Best Non-European Artist, Best Realistic Writing, Best Comical Writing, Best Science-Fiction Writing, and Promotion of Comics, in addition to the Grand Prix Saint-Michel for lifetime achievement and two “Future Prizes” for emerging artists (one realistic, one comical).

By the mid-1970s, the list of categories had become more focused. The 1977 edition awarded a Grand Prix Saint-Michel alongside prizes for Best Realistic Artwork, Best Comical Artwork, Best Foreign Artist, Best Realistic Writing, Best Comical Writing, and a Revelation prize for new talent.

In the 1980s, the awards appear to have been scaled back, whether due to limited records or reduced activity. By 1981, only a few categories were reported, including Grand Prix Saint-Michel, Best Comic, Best Foreign Artist, and Best Comical Artwork.

=== 2002 revival–2019 ===
After a long hiatus, the Prix Saint-Michel was revived in 2002 under the auspices of the Brussels-Capital Region Comics Festival. The structure was simplified to emphasize artistic excellence and major achievements. Core categories typically included the Grand Prix Saint-Michel for an author’s career, Best Comic (French-language), Best Comic (Dutch-language), Best Artwork, Best Story, a Press Prize, Future (for emerging talent), Youth, and Prestige awards [citation]. (Note: The bilingual framework reflected Belgium’s linguistic landscape and the Prix’s continued recognition of creators across both French- and Dutch-language comics traditions.) Occasional distinctions such as the Prix Saint-Michel Prestige and Grand Prix de l’Illustration were also presented in later years.

== Awards ==
=== First phase ===
==== 1971 ====
- Grand Prix Saint-Michel: Edgar Pierre Jacobs
- Best realistic artwork: Victor Hubinon
- Best comical artwork: prize shared by Willy Vandersteen and Jean Roba
- Best science-fiction artwork: Eddy Paape
- Best European artist: Jean Giraud
- Best non-European artist: Al Capp
- Best realistic writing: Jean-Michel Charlier
- Best comical writing: Maurice Tillieux
- Best science-fiction writing: Greg
- Comics promotion: CSP Imagine (organizers of the Lucca Comics & Games festival)
- Future prize: realistic: Juan Manuel Cicuéndez
- Future prize: comical: Dany

==== 1972 ====
- Grand Prix Saint-Michel: Morris
- Best graphical research: Les Conquérants du Mexique by Jean Torton
- Best realistic artwork: William Vance
- Best comical artwork: André Franquin
- Best science-fiction artwork: Edgar P. Jacobs
- Best European artist: Sydney Jordan
- Best non-European artist: Richard Corben
- Best realistic writing: Greg
- Best comical writing: Raoul Cauvin
- Best science-fiction writing: Greg
- Comics promotion: Vasco Granja (for promoting comics in Portugal)

==== 1973 ====
- Grand Prix Saint-Michel: Hergé
- Best comical artwork: Berck
- Best research and documentation: Jacques Devos
- Best realistic artwork: Comanche by Hermann, Le Lombard
- Best comical artwork: Sammy by Berck, Dupuis
- Best science-fiction artwork: Les Petits hommes by Pierre Seron, Dupuis
- Best European artist: Bonvi (Franco Bonvicini), for Sturmtruppen
- Best non-European artist: Jim Steranko
- Best realistic writing: François Craenhals, for Chevalier Ardent, Casterman
- Best comical writing: Peyo and Yvan Delporte, for The Smurfs
- Best science-fiction writing: Vicq, for Sophie, Dupuis
- Comics promotion: Claude Moliterni, for his work with the French Society of Bandes Dessinées
- Special mention (humour): Louis Salvérius (posthumous)
- Special mention (science-fiction): Philippe Druillet for Lone Sloane

==== 1974 ====
- Grand Prix Saint-Michel: Jacques Laudy
- Best comic: Yoko Tsuno: La Forge de Vulcain by Roger Leloup, Dupuis
- Best comic (joint winner): Buddy Longway: Chinook by Derib, Le Lombard
- Best realistic artwork: Corentin: Le royaume des eaux noirs by Paul Cuvelier
- Best realistic story: Hugo Pratt
- Best satiric story: Le sergeant Laterreur by Gérald Frydman
- Best satiric artwork: Rififi by Mouminoux
- Best comical artwork: Le sergeant Laterreur by Touis
- Best comical story: Nero: Het lachvirus by Marc Sleen, Standaard Uitgeverij
- Research: Rock Dreams by Guy Peellaert
- Best foreign artist: La vie au grand air by Jean-Marc Reiser
- Special prize: Roland Topor, for his collaboration to the movie La Planète Sauvage

==== 1975 ====
- Grand Prix Saint-Michel: Jijé
- Best comical artwork: Sammy: Les gorilles font les fous by Berck (artist) and Raoul Cauvin (author), Dupuis
- Best realistic artwork: Claude Auclair
- Best fantasy artwork: Sirius
- Best foreign artist: F'Murr
- Best comical story: Raoul Cauvin
- Best realistic story: Claude Auclair
- Best fantasy story: Sirius
- Revelation: René Follet
- CABD Prize: Jacques Stocquart

==== 1976 ====
- Grand Prix Saint-Michel: Moebius
- Best epic artwork: Chevalier ardent: La dame des sables by François Craenhals, Casterman
- Best fantasy artwork: Wladimir by Monique and Carlos Roque, Dupuis
- Best foreign artist: Alex Barbier
- Best realistic story: Claude Auclair
- Best animated movie: Tarzoon by Boris Szulzinger
- Revelation (joint winners): René Deynis and Cosey

==== 1977 ====
- Grand Prix Saint-Michel: Jacques Tardi
- Best realistic artwork: Claude Auclair
- Best comical artwork: Marc Wasterlain
- Best foreign artist: Bonvi and Michel Blanc-Dumont
- Best realistic writing: Hugo Pratt
- Best comical writing: Raoul Cauvin
- Revelation: Serge Ernst

==== 1978 ====
- Grand Prix Saint-Michel: Yvan Delporte
- Best story: Histoire sans héros by Jean Van Hamme, Le Lombard
- Best comical story: Christian Godard
- Future: Frédéric Jannin
- Prix: Le goulag part 1 by Dimitri, Le Square

==== 1979 ====
- Grand Prix Saint-Michel: Cosey
- Best realistic artwork: Thorgal: L'île des mers gelées by Rosiński, Le Lombard
- Best comical story: Bidouille et Violette by Bernard Hislaire, Dupuis
- Best comical story (joint winner): Docteur Poche: L'île des hommes-papillons by Marc Wasterlain, Dupuis

==== 1980 ====
- Grand Prix Saint-Michel: Didier Comès
- Best story: Jean Van Hamme
- Prix: Jeremiah by Hermann, Le Lombard
- Best comical artist: André Geerts

==== 1981 ====
- Grand Prix Saint-Michel: Pastiches by Roger Brunel
- Best comic: Le Bal du Rat mort ^{FR} by Jean-François Charles and Jan Bucquoy
- Best foreign artist: Joost Swarte
- Best comical artwork: Robin Dubois: Dites-le avec des gags! by Turk, Le Lombard

==== 1982 ====
- Grand Prix Saint-Michel: Franz Drappier
- Prix: Jean-Claude Servais
- Best comic: Bob Fish by Yves Chaland

==== 1983 ====
- Best comic (joint winners):
  - La Belette by Didier Comès, Casterman
  - Thorgal: Au-delà des ombres by Rosiński (artist) and Jean Van Hamme (author), Le Lombard
- Best comical artist: Serge Ernst

==== 1984 ====
- Grand Prix Saint-Michel: Jeannette Pointu: Le dragon vert by Marc Wasterlain, Dupuis

==== 1986 ====
- Grand Prix Saint-Michel: Sambre by Yslaire, Glénat

=== Second phase ===
==== 2002 ====
- Grand Prix Saint-Michel: Hermann
- Best author (French language): Jacamon
- Best author (Dutch language): Luc Cromheecke
- Best artwork: Jean-François Charles
- Best story: Richelle
- Press prize: Miralles by Jean Dufaux
- Iris award: Le marquis D'Anaon: L'île de Brac by M. Bonhomme and Fabien Vehlmann, Dargaud

==== 2003 ====
- Grand Prix Saint-Michel: Jacques Martin
- Best author (French language): Juanjo Guarnido
- Best author (Dutch language): Jan Bosschaert
- Best artwork: Jean-Mouis Mourier
- Best story: André-Paul Duchâteau
- Press prize: Yves Swolfs
- Future: Le voyageur by Etienne Jung
- Youth (French language): Jojo by André Geerts
- Youth (Dutch language): Roboboy by Luc Cromheecke

==== 2004 ====
- Grand Prix Saint-Michel: Grzegorz Rosiński
- Best comic (French language): Ou le regard ne porte pas by Olivier Pont and George Abolin
- Best comic (Dutch language): De bewaker van de lans (part 3) by Ersel and Ferry
- Best artwork: Muchacho by Emmanuel Lepage
- Best story: Du plomb dans la tête by Matz
- Best international series: Donjon by Sfar and Trondheim
  - Nominated series: Betelgeuse by Léo, Capricorne by Andreas, Le Choucas, Les Coulisses du pouvoir, Le Cri du peuple, Djinn, Fog, Jerôme K. Jerome Bloche by Dodier and Makyo, Ludo, Les Olives Noires, Persepolis by Marjane Satrapi, Sambre by Yslaire, Tramp, Le Tueur, and Bouncer by François Boucq and Alejandro Jodorowsky.
- Press prize: Peyo l'enchanteur by Hugues Dayez
- Future: Dido: Le trophée d'effroi by Fahar
- Youth: L'élève Ducobu: Miss 10 sur 10 by Godi and Zidrou
- Public: Armelle et l'oiseau by Antoine Dode
- Illustration: Martine by Marcel Marlier, Casterman

==== 2005 ====
- Grand Prix Saint-Michel: Jean Graton
- Prestige: Albert Uderzo
- Best comic (French language): A l'ombre des bougainvillées by Jean-François Charles and Maryse Charles
- Best comic (Dutch language): Bye, bye, Kluit by Vincent
- Best artwork: Terra Incognita by Floc'h
- Best story: Le tour de valse by Lapière
- Press prize: Les éditeurs de Bande Dessinée by Thierry Bellefroid, Niffle
- Future: Fishermen story: En attendant Hemingway by Konior, Caravelle
- Youth: Game Over: Blork raider by Midam and Adam
- Best series: Lincoln by Jouvray

==== 2006 ====
- Grand Prix Saint-Michel: Lambil

- Jean Van Hamme
- François Walthéry
- Jacques Tardi
- André Juillard

- Best comic (French language): Shandy 2: Le dragon d'Austerlitz, Bertail and Matz, Delcourt

- Seuls 1: Disparition, Bruno Gazzotti and Fabien Vehlmann, Dupuis
- Vengeance du comte Skarbek 2: Un coeur de bronze, Grzegorz Rosiński and Yves Sente, Dargaud
- Alim le tanneur 2: Le vent de l'exil, Virginie Augustin and Wilfrid Lupano, Delcourt
- Combat ordinaire 3: Ce qui est précieux, Emmanuel Larcenet, Dargaud
- Sur les traces de Dracula 1: Vlad l'empaleur, Hermann and Yves H., Casterman
- Lune d'argent sur providence 1: L'enfants de l'abime, Éric Hérenguel, Glénat

- Best comic (Dutch language): Het belang van Ernst, Tom Bouden

- Vlad 7: 15 novembre, Griffo and Yves Swolfs, Le Lombard
- XIII 17: L'or de Maximilien, William Vance and Jean Van Hamme, Dargaud
- Suske en Wiske, Willy Vandersteen, Standaard Uitgeverij

- Best artwork: Révélations 2, Ramos and Jenkins, Soleil

- Shandy 2: Le dragon d'Austerlitz, Bertail and Matz, Delcourt
- Murena 5: La déesse noire, Philippe Delaby and Jean Dufaux, Dargaud
- Le ciel au-dessus de Bruxelles 1: Avant, Yslaire, Futuropolis
- Messire Guillaume 1: Contrées lointaines, Bonhomme and Bonneval, Dupuis
- Shelena 1, René Follet and Jéromine Pasteur, Casterman

- Best story: Le ciel au-dessus de Bruxelles 1: Avant, Yslaire, Futuropolis

- Protecto 1: La fabrique des mères éplorées, Matteo and Zidrou, Dupuis
- Quintett 3: Histoire d'Elias Cohen, Cuzor and Giroud, Dupuis
- Lune d'argent sur providence 1: L'enfants de l'abime, Éric Hérenguel, Glénat
- Combat ordinaire 3: Ce qui est précieux, Emmanuel Larcenet, Dargaud
- Mr. Mardi Gras descendres 4: Le vaccin de la resurrection, Eric Libergé, Dupuis
- Les petits ruisseaux 1, Pascal Rabaté, Futuropolis

- Press prize: Morris, Franquin, Peyo et le dessin animé, Philippe Capart and Dejasse, L'an 2

- Dino Attanasio, 60 ans de BD, Dino Attanasio, Coulon and De Kuyssche, Dargaud
- Sir Arthur Benton, Wannsee 1942, Perger and Tarek, Proust
- René Goscinny, première vue d'un scénariste de génie, Chatenet and Marmonnier, De La Martinie
- Periode glacière, Nicolas de Crécy, Futuropolis
- Jack Palmer, l'affaire du voile, René Pétillon, Albin Michel

- Future: Alim le tanneur 2: Le vent de l'exil, Virginie Augustin and Wilfrid Lupano, Delcourt

- Sir Arthur Benton, Wannsee 1942, Perger and Tarek, Proust
- Achtung Zelig 1, Krzysztof Gawronkiewicz and Rosenberg, Casterman
- Codex angélique 1: Izael, Mikaël Bourguion and Thierry Gloris, Delcourt
- Cross fire 2: Au service secret de sa sainteté, Pierre-Mony Chan and Sala, Soleil

- Youth: Blagues de Toto 4: Tueur à gags, Thierry Coppée, Delcourt

- Kid Paddle 10: Dark j'adore, Midam, Dupuis
- Démons d'Alexia 3: Yorthopia, Ers and Dugomier, Dupuis
- Spirou et Fantasio 48: L'homme qui ne voulait pas mourir, José-Luis Munuera and Jean-David Morvan, Dupuis
- Voyage d'Esteban 1: Baleinier, Bonhomme, Milan
- Ratafia 2: Un zèle imbecile, Frédéric Salsédo and Nicolas Pothier, Treize étrange

==== 2007 ====
- Grand Prix Saint-Michel: Marcel Gotlieb

- André Juillard
- Régis Loisel
- Jacques Tardi
- Jean Van Hamme

- Prestige: Willy Vandersteen
- Best comic (French language): Les Cinq conteurs de Bagdad, Frantz Duchazeau and Fabien Velhmann, Dargaud

- La Guerre des Sambre 1: Hugo & Iris, Jean Bastide and Vincent Mezil, Glénat – Futuropolis
- Le Sang des Porphyre 1: Soizik, Joël Parnotte and Balac, Dargaud
- Magasin général 2: Serge, Régis Loisel and Jean-Louis Tripp, Casterman
- Miss pas touche 2: Du sang sur les mains, Kerascoët and Hubert, Dargaud
- Muchacho 2, Emmanuel Lepage, Dupuis

- Best comic (Dutch language): De Maagd en de Neger, papa en Sofie, Judith Vanistendael, De Harmonie - Oog & Blik

- Suske en Wiske 292: De Nachtwachtbrigade, Luc Morjeau and Peter Van Gucht, Standaard Uitgeverij
- De Rode Ridder 214: De regensteen, Claus Scholtz and Martin Lodewijk, Standaard Uitgeverij
- Kaamelott 1: De heerscharen van de dood, Steven Dupré and Alexander Astier, Casterman
- De bewaker van de lans 5: De erfgenamen, Ersel and Ferry, Glénat

- Best artwork: Sur les traces de Dracula 3: Transylvania, Dany, Casterman

- Le ciel au-dessus de Bruxelles 2: Après, Yslaire, Futuropolis
- Le vent dans les sables 2: étranges étrangers, Michel Plessix, Delcourt
- Magasin général 2: Serge, Régis Loisel and Jean-Louis Tripp, Casterman
- Muchacho 2, Emmanuel Lepage, Dupuis
- Murena 6: Le sang des bêtes, Philippe Delaby, Dargaud

- Best story: Sir Arthur Benton 3: l'Assaut final, Tarek, Emmanuel Proust

- Largo Winch 15: Les yeux des gardiens du tao, Jean Van Hamme, Dupuis
- Le complexe du chimpanze 1: Paradoxe, Richard Marazano, Dargaud
- Le janitor 1: l'Ange de Malte, Yves Sente, Dargaud
- Quintett 4: Histoiure de Nafsika Vasli, Frank Giroud, Dupuis
- RG 1: Riyad-sur-Seine, Pierre Dragon, Gallimard

- Press prize: Arnest Ringard et Augraphie, Frédéric Jannin and Yvan Delporte, Marsu Productions

- Bruxelles métropole 1: Ville haute, Pablo Santander and Jean-François Di Giorgio, Glénat
- Gotlib 1: Ma vie en vrac, Gotlib, Flammarion
- Le Bouddha d'azur 2, Cosey, Dupuis
- Le retour à la terre 4: Le déluge, Manu Larcenet and Jean-Yves Ferri, Dargaud
- Les noëls de Franquin, André Franquin and Yvan Delporte, Marsu Productions

- Future: La Guerre des Sambre 1: Hugo & Iris, Jean Bastide and Vincent Mezil, Glénat - Futuropolis

- La licorne 1: Le dernier temple d'Asclepios, Anthony Jean and Mathieu Gabella, Delcourt
- Le grand siècle 1: Alphonse, Andriveau Simon, Delcourt
- Le monde selon François 1: Le secret des écrivains, Renaud Collin and Vincent Zabus, Dupuis
- Le trone d'argile 2: Le pont de Montereau, Theo Caneschi and Nicolas Jarry, Delcourt
- Orbital 2: Ruptures, Serge Pelle and Sylvain Runberg, Dupuis

- Youth: Nävis: Latitzoury, José-Luis Munuera and Jean-David Morvan, Delcourt

- Basil et Victoria 5: Ravenstein, Edith and Yann, Les Humanoïdes Associés
- Jojo 16: Jojo vétérinaire, André Geerts, Dupuis
- Le monde selon François 1: Le secret des écrivains, Renaud Collin and Vincent Zabus, Dupuis
- Le voyage d'Esteban 2: Traqués, Mathieu Bonhomme, Milan
- Ma maman ... 1: Est en Amérique et elle a rencontrée Buffalo Bill, Emile Bravo and Jean Regnaud, Gallimard

==== 2008 ====
- Grand Prix Saint-Michel: Raoul Cauvin

- Christophe Arleston
- Moebius
- Jean Van Hamme
- François Walthéry

- Best comic (French language): Spirou hors série 4: Journal d'un ingénu, Emile Bravo, Dupuis

- Bois des vierges 1, Béatrice Tillier and Jean Dufaux, Robert Laffont
- De Gaule a la page, Jean-Yves Ferri, Dargaud
- Il était une fois en France 1: L'empire de monsieur Joseph, Sylvain Vallée and Fabien Nury, Glénat
- Les aigles de Rome 1, Enrico Marini, Dargaud
- Miss Endicott 1 and 2, Xavier Fourquemin and Jean-Christophe Derrien, Lombard
- Sang des porphyre 2: Konan, Joel Parnotte and Balac, Dargaud

- Best comic (Dutch language): ''Jump 1-3, Charel Cambré, Standaard Uitgeverij

- De eenzame snelweg: In het spoor van..., Raoul Deleo and Auke Hulst, Meulenhoff
- De Furox 1: Diaspora, Simon Spruyt, Bries
- Havank 1: Hoofden op hol, Daan Jippes and HF Van Der Kallen, Luitingh-Sijthoff
- Het jaar van de olifant 3-6, Willy Linthout, Bries
- Meccano 10: De ruwe gids, Hanco Kolk, De Harmonie

- Best artwork: La Quête de l'oiseau du temps 2: Le grimoire des dieux, Mohamed Aouamri, Dargaud

- Bois des vierges 1, Béatrice Tillier, Robert Laffont
- Bouncer 8: La veuve noire, François Boucq, Humano
- La femme accident 1, Olivier Grenson, Dupuis
- Les aigles de Rome 1, Enrico Marini, Dargaud
- Pêches mignons 2: Chasse à l'homme, Arthur De Pins, Fluide Glacial
- Sang des porphyre 2: Konan, Joel Parnotte, Dargaud
- Spirou hors série 3: Tombeau des Champignac, Fabrice Tarrin, Dupuis

- Best story: Il était une fois en France 1: L'empire de monsieur Joseph, Fabien Nury, Glénat

- Coeur des batailles 1 and 2, Jean-David Morvan, Delcourt
- Pascal brutal 2: Male dominant, Riad Sattouf, Fluide
- RG 2: Bangkok-Belleville, Pierre Dragon, Gallimard
- Sept missionaires 4, Alain Ayroles, Delcourt
- Spirou hors série 4: Journal d'un ingénu, Emile Bravo, Dupuis
- Tanatos 1: L'année sanglante, Didier Convard, Glénat
- Tiffany 2: Célestine T 1867, Yann, Delcourt

- Press prize: J'étais Tintin au cinéma, Hergé and Jean-Pierre Talbot, Jourdan

- De Gaule a la page, Jean-Yves Ferri, Dargaud
- Franquin: Chronolgie d'un oeuvre, André Franquin, Bocquet and Verhoest, Marsu Productions
- RG 2: Bangkok-Belleville, Frederik Peeters and Pierre Dragon, Gallimard
- La véritable histoire de Futuropolis 1: 1972 - 1994, Florence Cestac, Dargaud
- Voyaguer de Troy: Entretien avec Arleston, Christophe Arleston and Thierry Bellefroid, Soleil

- Future: Lawrence d'Arabie 1: La revolte arabe, Alexis Horellou and Tarek, Emmanuel Proust

- Le monde selon François 2: Les amants éternels, Renaud Collin and Vincent Zabus, Dupuis
- Pêches mignons 2: Chasse à l'homme, Arthur De Pins, Fluide Glacial
- Taiga rouge 1, Vincent Perriot and Arnaud Malherbe, Dupuis
- La ligne de fuite, Benjamin Flao and Christophe Dabitch, Futuropolis

- Youth: Démons d'Alexia 4: Le syndrôme de Salem, Benoît Ers and Dugomier, Dupuis

- Jacques le petit lézard géant 1, Libon, Dupuis
- Jojo 17: Confisqué, André Geerts, Dupuis
- Le monde selon François 2: Les amants éternels, Renaud Collin and Vincent Zabus, Dupuis
- Seuls 3: Le clan du requin, Bruno Gazzotti and Fabien Vehlmann, Dupuis
- Spirou hors série 3: Tombeau des Champignac, Fabrice Tarrin, Dupuis

==== 2009 ====
- Grand Prix Saint-Michel: Jean Van Hamme
- Best comic (French language): Il était une fois en France, Fabien Nury and Sylvain Vallée, Glénat
- Best comic (Dutch language): Kaamelott, Steven Dupré, Casterman
- Best artwork: Long John Silver 2: Neptune, Mathieu Lauffray, Dargaud
- Best artwork (joint winner): XIII Mystery 1: La mangouste, Ralph Meyer, Dargaud
- Best story: Lulu femme nue, Etienne Davodeau, Futuropolis
- Press prize: Marzi: La bruit des vi!lles, Sylvain Savoia, Dupuis
- Future: Pico Bogue: Situations critiques, Dominique Roques and Alexis Dormal, Dargaud
- Youth: Légende de Changeling: Le croque-mitaine, Xavier Fourquemin and Pierre Dubois, Le Lombard

==== 2010 ====
- Grand Prix Saint-Michel: André-Paul Duchâteau
- Best comic (French language): Quai d'Orsay 1, Christophe Blain and Abel Lanzac, Dargaud

- Bouncer 7, François Boucq and Alejandro Jodorowsky, Humanoïdes
- Il était une fois en France 3, Sylvain Vallée and Fabien Nury, Glénat
- Long John Silver 3, Matthieu Lauffray and Xavier Dorison, Dargaud
- Rebetiko 1, David Prudhomme, Futuropolis

- Best comic (Dutch language): Boerke 6, Pieter de Poortere, Oog en Blik

- Apostata 2, Ken Broeders, Standaard Uitgeverij
- De telescoop, Paul Teng and Jean Van Hamme, Casterman
- Het jaar van de olifant 2, Willy Linthout, Catullus
- Playin' Smilin' Fightin' Cookin' , Philippe Paquet and different writers, Bries

- Best artwork: Le dernier des Mohicains, Cromwell, Soleil

- Bois Maury 14, Hermann, Glénat
- Murena 7, Philippe Delaby, Dargaud
- Siegfried 2, Alex Alice, Dargaud
- Chat qui courait sur les toits, René Hausman, Lombard

- Best story: Lefranc 28, Michel Jacquemart, Casterman

- Ethan Ringler 5, Denis-Pierre Filippi, Dupuis
- Il était une fois en France 3, Fabien Nury, Glénat
- Long John Silver 3, Xavier Dorison, Dargaud
- Signe de la lune, Enrique Bonet, Dargaud

- Press prize: Pour l'Empire 1, Merwan and Bastien Vives, Dargaud

- Encyclopédie de la féerie 1, Mohamed Aouamri and Pierre Dubois, Dargaud
- Putain de guerre intégrale 2, Jacques Tardi and Jean-Pierre Verney, Casterman
- Ben Laden Dévoilé, Philippe Bercovici and Mohamed Sifaoui, 12 Bis
- Yvan Delporte: rédacteur en chef, Christelle and Bertrand Pissavy-Yvernault, Dupuis

- Future: Magus 2, Annabel, Glénat

- Missi Dominici 1, Benoit Dellac and Thierry Gloris, Vents d'Ouest
- Talisman 2, Montse Martin and François Debois, Glénat
- Koryu d'Edo, Dimitri Piot, Glénat

- Youth: Quatre de Bakerstreet 2, David Etien, Djian and Legrand, Vents d'Ouest

- Jerome K. Jerome Blôche 21, Alain Dodier, Dupuis
- Pico Bogue 3, Alexis Dormal and Dominiques Roques, Dargaud
- Une aventure de ... Spirou 6, Fabrice Parme and Lewis Trondheim, Dupuis
- Tamara 8, Christian Darasse and Zidrou, Dupuis

==== 2011 ====
- Grand Prix Saint-Michel: Philippe Delaby
- Best comic (French language):Sambre 6, Yslaire, Glénat

- Blacksad 4, Juanjo Guarnido and Juan Diaz Canales, Dargaud
- Matteo 2, Jean-Pierre Gibrat, Futuropolis
- Page Noire, Ralph Meyer, Frank Giroud and Denis Lapière, Futuropolis
- Zombillenium 1, Arthur de Pins, Dupuis

- Best comic (Dutch language): Ondergronds, Wauter Mannaert and Pierre De Jaeger, Oog & Blik

- Apache Junction 1, Peter Nuyten, Silvester
- Dickie 4, Pieter De Poortere, Glénat
- Grand Prix 2, Marvano, Dargaud
- Vincent van Gogh, Marc Verhaeghen and Jan Kragt, Eureducation

- Best artwork: Sept Cavaliers 3, Jacques Terpant, Delcourt

- Bois des Vierges 2, Beatrice Tillier, Delcourt
- Polina, Bastien Vives, Casterman
- XIII Mystery 3, Eric Henninot, Dargaud
- Yaxin 1, Man Arenas, Soleil

- Best story: Alter Ego, Pierre-Paul Renders and Denis Lapière, Dupuis

- Il était une fois en France 4, Fabien Nury, Glénat
- Mezek, Yann, Lombard
- Les mondes de Thorgal: Kriss de Valnor 1, Yves Sente, Lombard
- La Mort de Staline: Une histoire vraie 1, Fabien Nury, Dargaud

- Press prize:Maurice Tillieux, Maurice Tillieux and Vincent Odin, Daniel Maghen

- La Mort de Staline: Une histoire vraie 1, Thierry Robin and Fabien Nury, Dargaud
- Spirou Dream Team, Simon Leturgie and Yann, Dupuis
- Venus Noire, Renaud Pennelle and Abdellatif Kechiche, Proust

- Future:Khaal, Valentin Secher and Stephane Louis, Soleil

- Barracuda 1, Jeremy Petiqueux and Jean Dufaux, Dargaud
- Ondergronds, Wauter Mannaert and Pierre de Jaeger, Oog & Blik
- Les voyages de Lefranc, Olivier Weinberg, Jacques Martin e.a., Casterman

- Youth:Le royaume 3, Benoît Feroumont, Dupuis

- La légende du changeling 4, Xavier Fourquemin and Pierre Dubois, Lombard
- Maki 2, Fabrice Tarrin, Dupuis
- Mon pépé est un fantôme 4, Taduc and Nicolas Barral, Dupuis

==== 2012 ====
- Grand Prix Saint-Michel: Jean-François Charles
- Best comic (French language):Le Mort de Staline, Fabien Nury and Thierry Robin
- Best comic (Dutch language): Afspraak in Nieuwpoort, Ivan Adriaenssens
- Best artwork: XIII Mystery: Colonel Amos, François Boucq
- Best story: Olympe de Gouges, José-Louis Bocquet
- Press prize:Svoboda 2, Jean-Denis Pendanx and Kris
- Future:Du vent sous les pieds emporte mes pas, Gaëtan Brynaert
- Youth:Les Légendaires origines, Nadou
- Prestige: Stelo Fenzo

==== 2013 ====
- Grand Prix Saint-Michel: Philippe Geluck
- Best comic (French language):Il était une fois en France 6, Fabien Nury and Sylvain Vallée
- Best comic (Dutch language): Amoras 1, Charel Cambré and Marc Legendre
- Best artwork: Le Loup des Mers, Riff Reb's
- Best story: Dent d'Ours 1, Yann
- Press prize:Marcinelle 1956 , Sergio Salma
- Future:La Peau de l'Ours, Oriol
- Youth:Lou 6, Julien Neel

==== 2015 ====
- Grand Prix Saint-Michel: François Walthéry
- Best comic (French language): Amère Russie 2 by Anlor and Aurélien Ducoudray
- Best comic (Dutch language): De terugkeer van de wespendief by Aimée de Jongh
- Best artwork: Ralph Meyer for Undertaker 1
- Best story: Pat Perna for Kersten, médecin d'Himmler 1
- Press prize: Mobutu dans l'espace by Eddy Vaccaro and Aurélien Ducoudray
- Future: Roi ours by Mobidic
- Youth: Les carnets de Cérise 3 by Aurélie Neyret and Joris Chamblain

==== 2016 ====
- Grand Prix Saint-Michel: Milo Manara
- Best comic (French language): L'homme qui tua Lucky Luke by Matthieu Bonhomme
- Best comic (Dutch language): Jhen 15 by Paul Teng
- Best artwork: Frederik Peeters for L’odeur des garçons affamés
- Best story: Xavier Dorison and Fabien Nury for Comment faire fortune en juin 40
- Press prize: Christophe Simon for Corentin 8
- Future: Communardes 2 by Lucy Mazel
- Youth: Les enfants de la résistance 2 by Benoît Ers and Vincent Dugomier

==== 2017 ====
- Grand Prix Saint-Michel: Philippe Berthet
- Best comic (French language): L'adoption 2 by Arno Monin and Zidrou
- Best comic (Dutch language): Het wijfje by Nele Sys
- Best artwork: José Homs for Shi 1
- Best story: Nathalie Sergeef for Hyver 1709 2
- Press prize: Mickey Mouse, café Zombo by Régis Loisel
- Future: Reporter n° 1 Bloody Sunday by Gontran Toussaint
- Youth: Dad 3 by Nob

==== 2018 ====
- Grand Prix Saint-Michel: Jean-Claude Mézières
- Best comic (French language): Il s'appelait Ptirou by Yves Sente and Laurent Verron
- Best artwork: David Sala for Le joueur d'échecs
- Best story: Lewis Trondheim for Je vais rester
- Future: Churchill et moi by Andrea Cucchi
- Youth: Frnck 3 by Brice Cossu and Olivier Bocquet
- Humour: The Old Geezers 4 by Paul Cauuet and Wilfrid Lupano

==== 2019 ====
- Grand Prix Saint-Michel: François Boucq
- Best comic (French language): Kivu by Christophe Simon and Jean Van Hamme
- Best artwork: Laurent Astier for La Venin
- Best story: Vincent Perriot for Negalyod
- Future: Le Dernier Refuge by Alex-Imé
- Youth: Raowl by Tébo
- Humour: Les Méchants de l’Histoire - Hitler by Ptiluc and Wilfrid Lupano
