= Frank Pé =

Belgian comics artist (1956–2025)

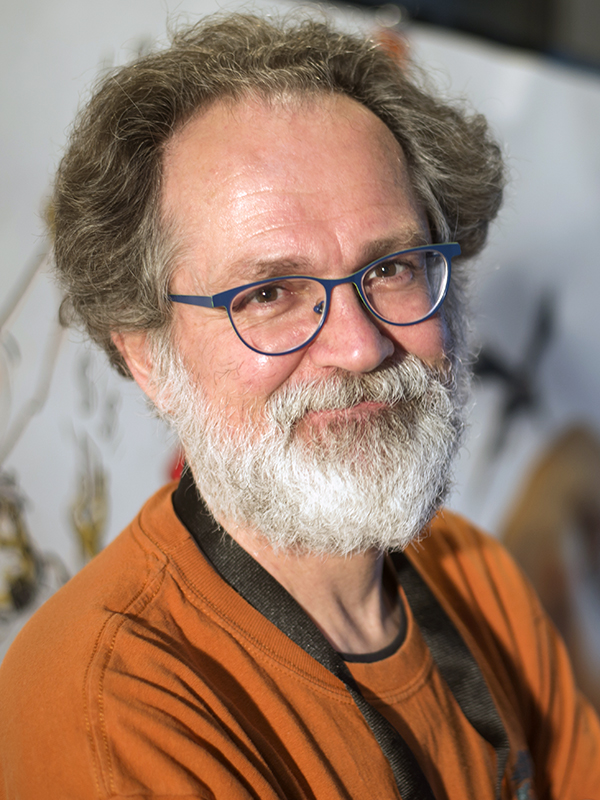
- Pé in 2016
- Born: 15 July 1956 Elsene, Belgium
- Died: 29 November 2025 (aged 69)
- Areas: Cartoonist, Writer, Artist, Colorist
- Awards: Full list

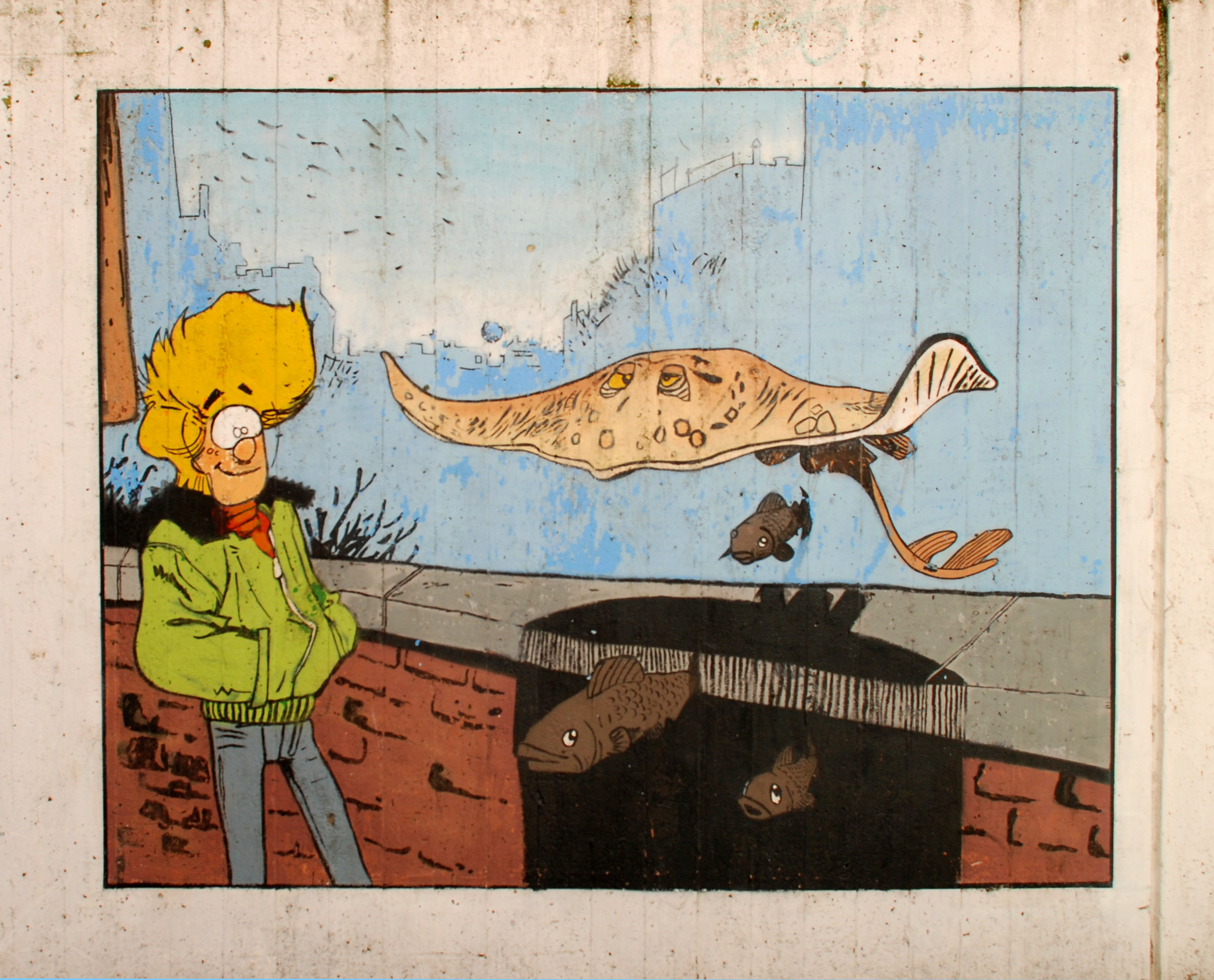
Mural "Broussaille" in Louvain-la-Neuve (Belgium).

Frank Pé (15 July 1956 – 29 November 2025), often signing solely as Frank, was a Belgian comic book artist, best known for Broussaille and Zoo.

== Life and career ==
Frank Pé was born in Ixelles on 15 July 1956. After studying sculpture for three years at the Institut Saint-Luc in Brussels (with costudents like Bernard Hislaire), he began to create comics and illustrations for Spirou magazine, specializing in articles about animals. The fictional presenter of these stories, an adolescent named Broussaille, later got his own series, putting Pé in the limelight.

In the meantime, he also created L'élan, a moose whose aim in life is to have his own comic and his own albums. His first album was the one-shot Comme un animal en cage (Like an Animal in a Cage), written by Thierry Martens, then editor-in-chief at Spirou. Beginning in 1994, he worked on his two main series: Zoo, planned as a trilogy, and Broussaille. Zoo is a romantic and nostalgic series, while Broussaille is contemporary, allowing the author to intertwine it with his own life – featuring adventures in Brussels and in countries he has visited, such as Japan.

Pé was a slow worker, having only published 10 albums in 22 years. Over that time, he also contributed to the Warner Bros. Animation movie Quest for Camelot, but not much of his work was kept in the final film. He also made sculptures in bronze, and produced many illustrations for Scouting calendars. In 1993, he developed the series Matur for Kodansha.

As his main influences, Pé cited comics artists like André Franquin, Dany and Wasterlain, but also different artists like the sculptor Auguste Rodin, the painter Egon Schiele, and the film director Andrei Tarkovsky. Apart from art and comics, Pé's main interest was animals. He raised 50 reptiles, including 16 crocodiles.

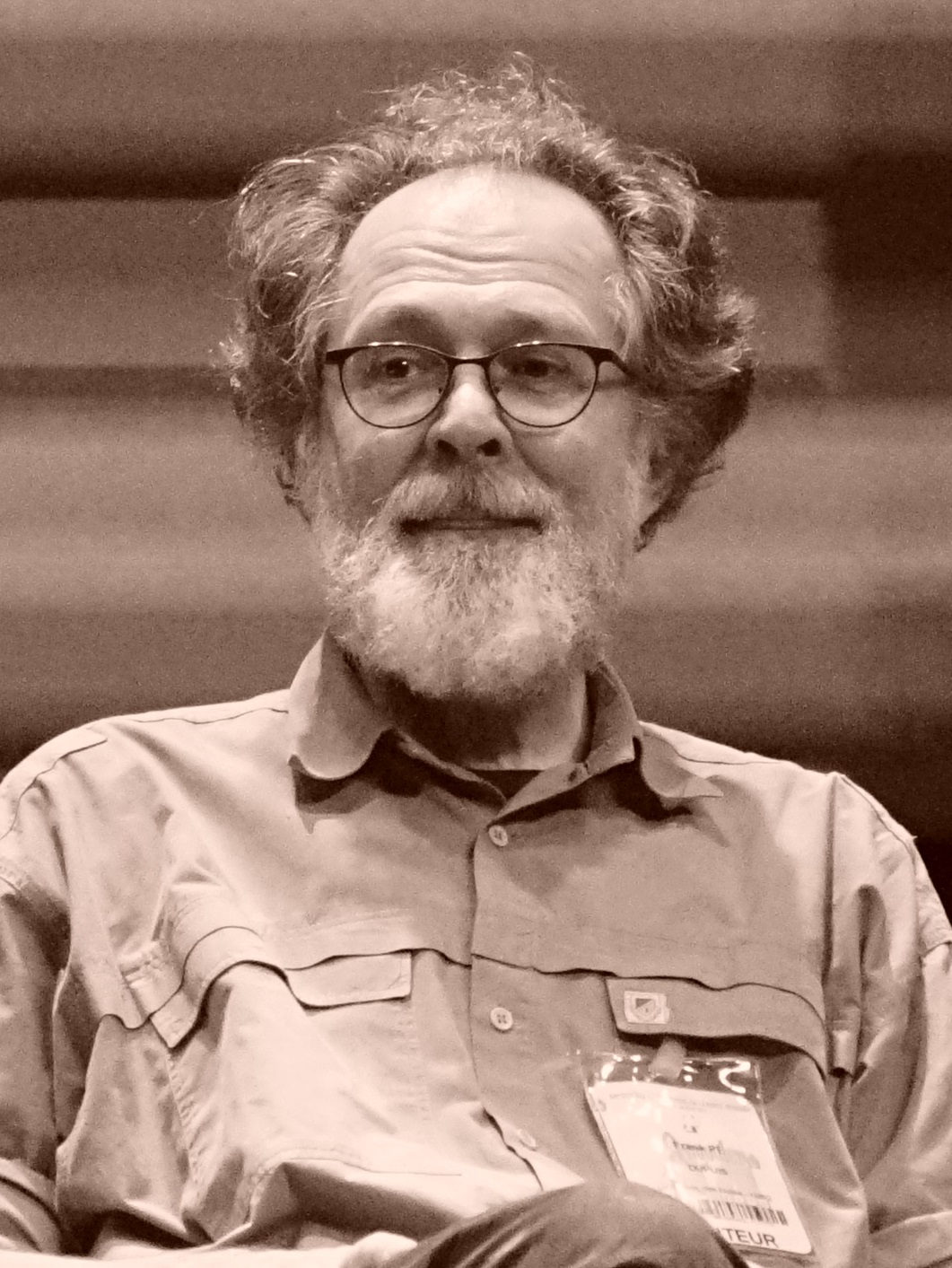
Pé during the 2017 Angoulême International Comics Festival

Pé died on 29 November 2025, at the age of 69.

== Bibliography ==
Series	Years	Volumes	Scenarist	Editor
Mémoires de l'élan	1984–1992	2	Frank Pé	Dupuis and BD Club (Genève)
Comme un animal en cage	1985	1	Terence (Thierry Martens)	Dupuis
Broussaille	1987–	5	Bom (last album by Frank Pé alone)	Dupuis
Zoo	1994–2007	3	Bonifay	Dupuis
Le Spirou de…	2016	1	Zidrou	Dupuis
La Bête	2020	2	Zidrou	Dupuis

He also contributed illustrations to Entre Chats, a 1989 book with other drawings by André Franquin, René Hausman, André Juillard and Max Cabanes, published by Delcourt.

== Awards ==
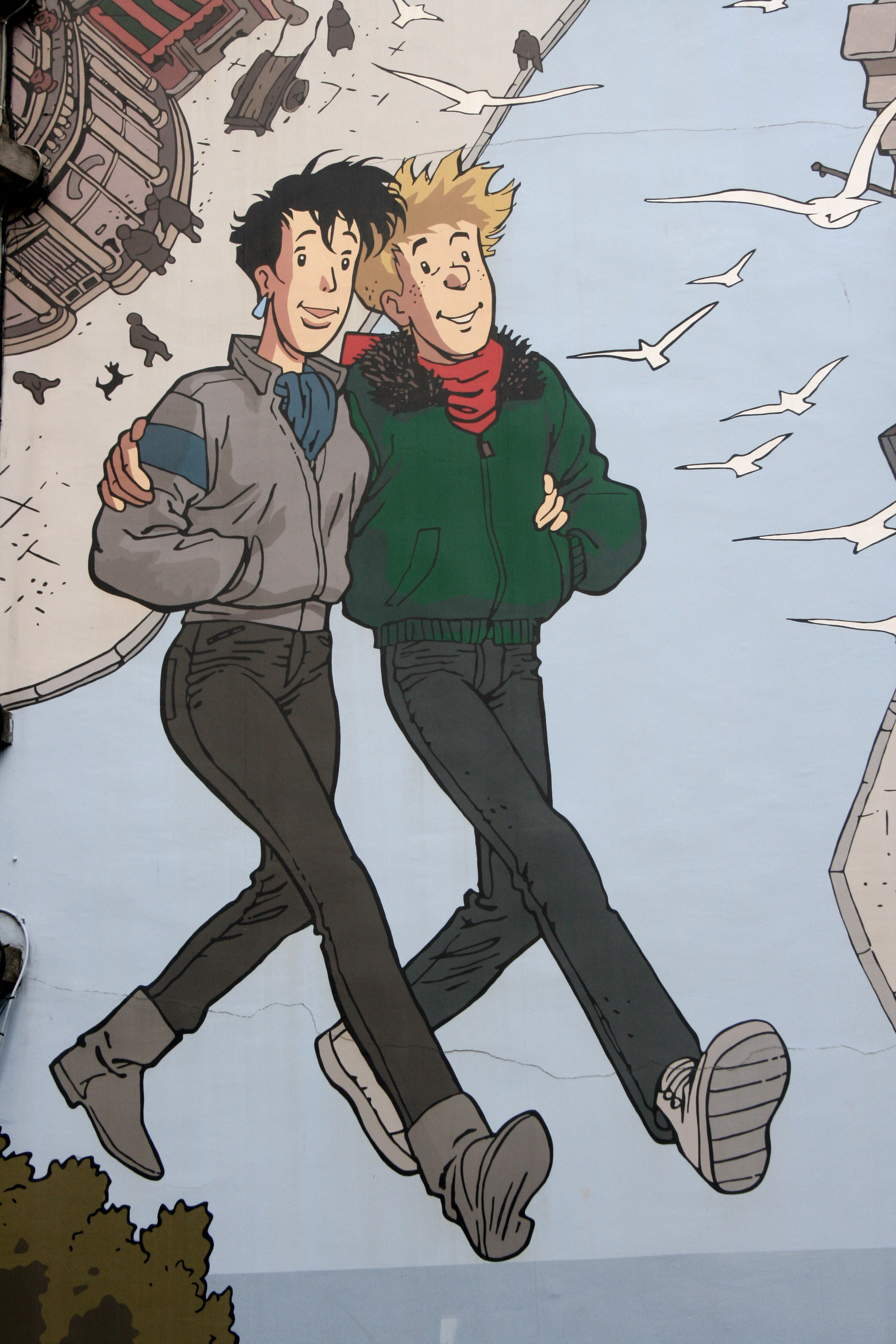
Pé's 1991 mural in Brussels was the first of the Comic Book Route

- 1984: (Belgium) Promise Award given by the Belgian Chamber of Comic Strip Experts (Brousaille, tome 2)
- 1985: (Switzerland) Alpages Prize in Sierre (Broussaille, tome 1)
- 1989: (France) Grand Prix de Grenoble (Broussaille, tome 1)
- 1990: (France) Christian Comic Award and Audience Award at the Angoulême International Comics Festival (Brousaille, tome 3)
- 1994: (Belgium) Award for best drawing given by the Belgian Chamber of Comic Strip Experts (Zoo)
- 1996: (Germany) Best imported comic at the Max & Moritz Prizes (Zoo)
- 2002: (France) Quai des Bulles festival prize for his complete works
- 2006: (Belgium) City of Andenne prize for his complete works
- 2017: (Belgium) Prix Atomium (La Lumière de Bornéo)
- 2021: (France) Prix Albert-Uderzo (La Bête)

In 1991, a mural painting of Broussaille was unveiled in Brussels. It was the first in a long series of now over 30 murals celebrating comic heroes in the city.

== Sources ==
- Béra, Michel; Denni, Michel; and Mellot, Philippe (2002): "Trésors de la Bande Dessinée 2003–2004". Paris, Les éditions de l'amateur. ISBN 2-85917-357-9
