= Long John Silver (disambiguation) =

Long John Silver is the fictional character from Robert Louis Stevenson's novel Treasure Island

Long John Silver may also refer to:

- Long John Silver (film), a 1954 film starring Robert Newton as the character
- The Adventures of Long John Silver, a 1955 TV series starring Robert Newton as Silver
- Long John Silver's, a restaurant chain
- Long John Silver (album), by Jefferson Airplane
- Long John Silver (comics), a graphic novel series written by Xavier Dorison and illustrated by Mathieu Laufray
- "Long John Silver", a 1996 song by German group Loft
- "Long John Silver", a 2015 song by Richard Thompson from his album Still

== See also ==
- Long john (disambiguation)
