= Angoulême International Comics Festival Religious award =

Former comics award at the Angoulême festival

A variety of religious awards has been presented to comics at the Angoulême International Comics Festival between 1985 and 2003. This award is granted by religious organizations or newspapers and it is not part of the official festival.

== 1980s ==
- 1985: Christian testimony award: Le Transperceneige by Jean-Marc Rochette and Jacques Lob, Casterman
- 1986: Christian testimony award: Sang d'Arménie by Guy Vidal and Florenci Clavé
- 1987: Christian testimony award: Route vers l'enfer by Daniel Goossens
- 1987: Christian comic award: Raoul Follereau: Le vagabond de la charité by Bruno Le Sourd
- 1988: Christian testimony award: Maus: un survivant raconte by Art Spiegelman, Flammarion
- 1988: Christian comic award: Les fumées bleues du Caire by Jean Duverdier and Michèle Blimer
- 1989: Christian testimony award: Ramadan by Farid Boudjellal
- 1989: Christian comic award: Mathilde Wrede by Carmen Levi and Alex Lochen

== 1990s ==
- 1990: Christian testimony award: Afrikaans bazaar by Jean-Louis Tripp
- 1990: Christian comic award: Broussaille: La nuit du chat by Frank Pé and Bom, Dupuis
- 1991: Christian comic award: Melmoth by Marc-Renier and Rodolphe
- 1992: Christian comic award: Ignace, nous n'irons plus à Jérusalem by Cécile Schmitz and Jacques Stoquart
- 1992: Christian comic youth award: Yasuda by Martin Ryelandt and Jung
- (1993: no awards in this category)
- 1994: Oecumenic jury award: Tonnerre en Chine by Luc Foccroulle and Dominique Bar, Coccinelle BD (according to ToutenBD) / Mademoiselle Louise volume 1 by André Geerts and Sergio Salma, Casterman (according to newspapers reporting on the death of Geerts)
- 1995: Oecumenic jury award: Le Centenaire by Jacques Ferrandez, Casterman
- (1996: no awards in this category)
- (1997: no awards in this category)
- (1998: no awards in this category)
- (1999: no awards in this category)

== 2000s ==
- 2000: Oecumenic jury award: La terre sans mal by Emmanuel Lepage and Anne Sibran, Dupuis
- 2000: Christian comic award: La Bible by Jeff Anderson and Mike Maddox, Pre-au Clerc
- 2001: Oecumenic jury award: Le Journal de mon père part 3 by Jiro Taniguchi, Casterman
- 2002: Oecumenic jury award: Amours Fragiles: Le dernier printemps by Jean-Michel Beuriot and Philippe Richelle, Casterman
  - Special mention: Un Ilot de bonheur by Christophe Chabouté, Éditions Paquet
- 2003: Christian comic award: Voyage vers Léon IX by Francis Keller and Thierry Wintzner, Editions du Signe
  - Special mention: Auriac by Marco Venanzi and Benoît Despas, Coccinelle BD
- 2003: Oecumenic jury award: Le Chat du Rabin part 1 by Joann Sfar, Dargaud
  - Special mention: Petit Polio by Farid Boudjellal, Soleil
