= Anouk Ricard =

French comic book writer and illustrator (born 1970)

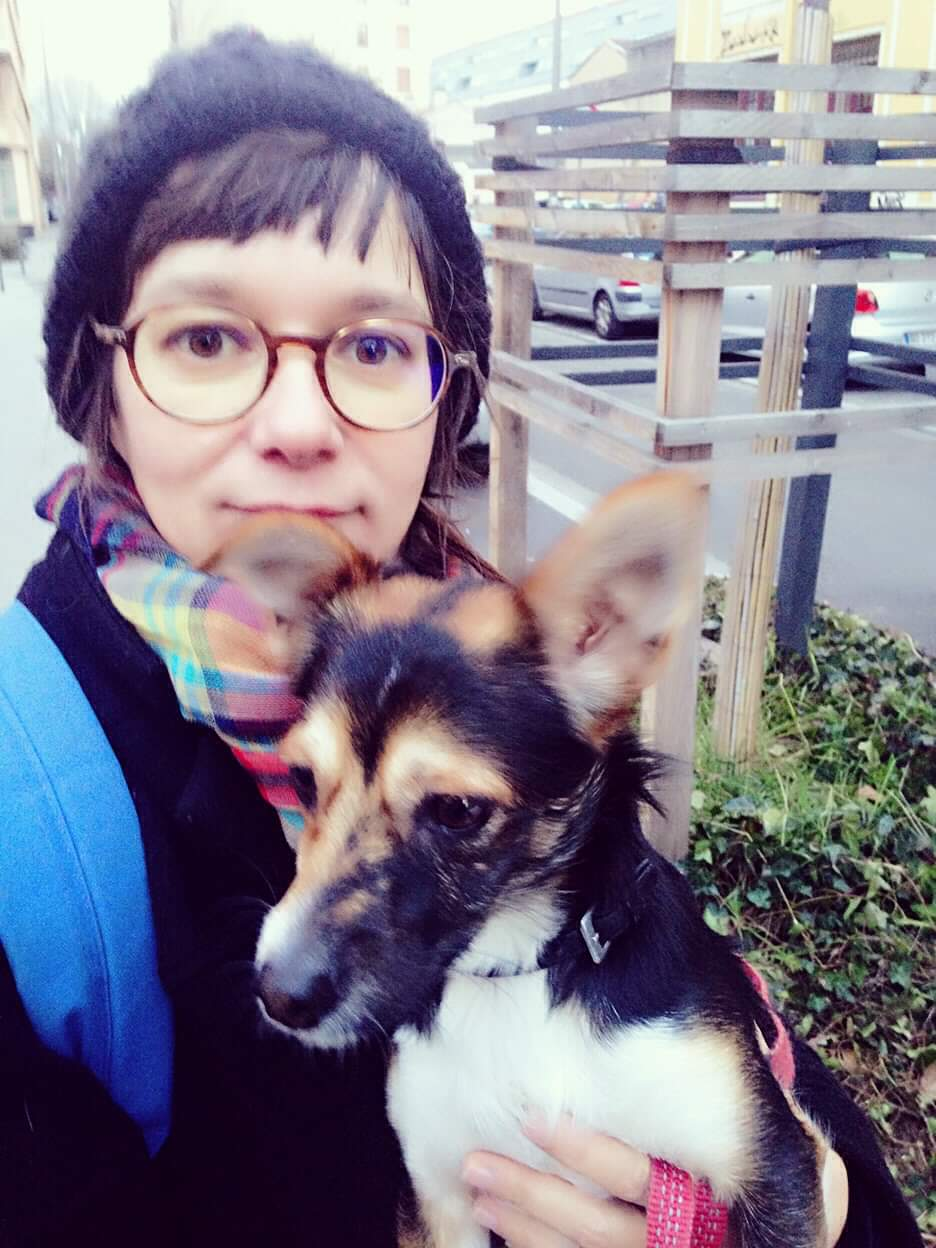
- Born: 28 December 1970 (age 55); Istres, France
- Known for: comics author

Anouk Ricard (born 28 December 1970) is a French comic book writer and illustrator.

== Life ==
Ricard was born in Istres, studied two years at the École supérieure d'art d'Aix-en-Provence and received a diploma in illustration from the École supérieure des arts décoratifs de Strasbourg. She then settled in Marseille where she produced animated films, worked for youth publishers and produced her first books. She returned to Strasbourg, where she began working on graphic novels. Her series Anna et Froga which she began in 2004 for Capsule Comique. Her work was selected three times for awards at the Angoulême International Comics Festival; in 2025 she won the Grand Prix. She also produced Commissaire Toumi, aimed at an older market. In 2009, she began a series of strips Galaxie chérie with Hugo Piette for the magazine Spirou. This was followed by Patti et les fourmis in 2010 and Coucous Bouzon in 2011; these were both official selections of the International Comics Festival. In 2014, she was named by GQ France magazine as one of the 25 most humorous women in France. She currently lives in Lyon.

Ricard also produces paintings for comics festivals and sings and plays music under the pseudonym Frouky.
