= Long John =

Long John may refer to:

== People with the nickname or stage name ==
- Long John Baldry (John William Baldry, 1941-2005), British-born Canadian blues singer and voice actor
- Giorgio Chinaglia (1947-2012), Italian footballer
- John Daly (golfer) (born 1966), American golfer
- John Ewing (baseball) (1863-1895), American professional baseball player
- Long John Hunter (John Thurman Hunter, Jr., 1931-2016), American guitarist, singer and songwriter
- Raymond Martorano (1927-2002), Italian-American mobster
- Long John Nebel (John Zimmerman, 1911-1978), American radio host
- John Reilly (baseball) (1858-1937), American baseball player
- John Sorrell (ice hockey) (1906-1984), Canadian ice hockey player
- John Wentworth (Illinois politician) (1815-1888), American politician and newspaper editor

== Other uses ==
- Long John Silver, a fictional character in the novel Treasure Island
- Long John (bull), #58x, (2010–2017) a world champion bucking bull
- Long John (doughnut), a bar-shaped pastry
- Long John (bicycle), a two-wheeled front-loading freight bicycle
- Long underwear, also called long johns
- Long John, a blended Scotch whisky

== See also ==
- Long John Silver (disambiguation)
- Tillandsia 'Long John', a hybrid plant cultivar
