= François Boucq =

French comic book artist

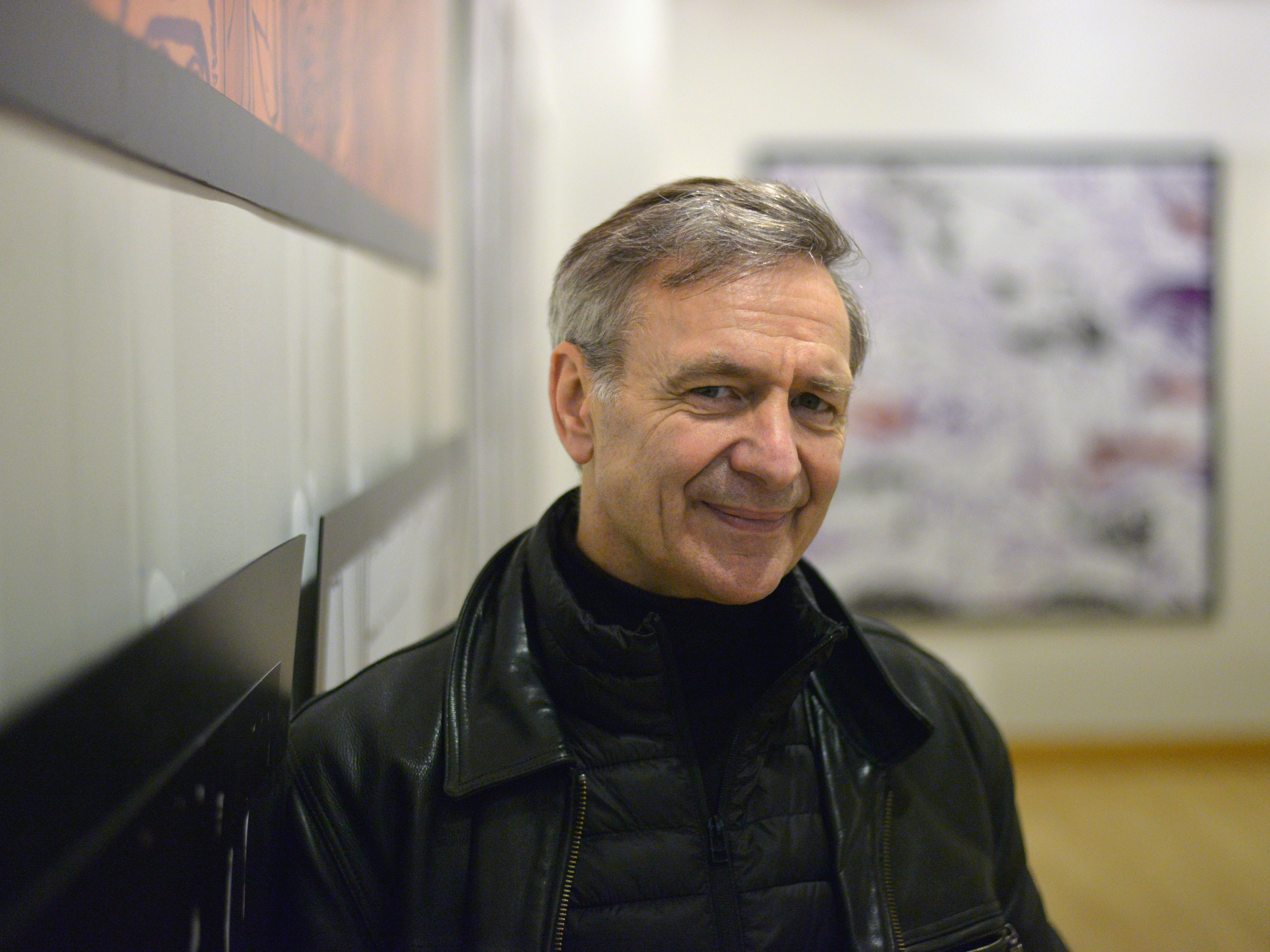
Francois Boucq in 2015

François Boucq (French: [buk]; born 28 November 1955 in Lille), is a French comic book artist. He is most famous for his satirical and surreal comics revolving around the main character Jérôme Moucherot.

== Career ==
Boucq published cartoons in magazines like Le Point or L'Expansion at an early age. Soon, he also created comic albums, becoming famous with Les pionniers de l'aventure humaine. Many more have been published in the meantime, including La Femme du magicien (1986) Bouche du diable (1990) and Little Tulip (2014) with American novelist Jerome Charyn. Boucq created the successful series Face de Lune in cooperation with the artist Alexandro Jodorowsky. 1994 saw the publication of Les dents du recoin, the first album of a series of surreal comics that feature Jérôme Moucherot, a door-to-door insurance salesman with a fountain pen through his nose, who is dressed in a leopard fur suit; his bizarre adventures take place in a world where Smurfs are jungle-dwelling headhunters and sharks swim around in the blue wallpapers of bourgeois living rooms.

Boucq later teamed up with Jodorowsky again, creating the graphic novel series Bouncer, set in a bleak Western scenario.

In 1998, Boucq was awarded the Grand Prix de la ville d'Angoulême. In keeping with the festival's tradition, he was the president of the jury in the following year.

== Personal life ==
Apart from his comic book career he is an enthusiast of kendo (Japanese fencing), in which he achieved a 5 Dan master grade.

== Selected bibliography ==
- Les pionniers de l'aventure humaine (Pioneers Of The Human Adventure)
- La Femme du magicien (The Magician's Wife) with writer Jerome Charyn
- La pédagogie du trottoir
- Bouche du diable (Billy Budd, KGB) with writer Jerome Charyn
- Face de Lune with Alejandro Jodorowsky
- Un point c'est tout
- Les dents du recoin
- Little Tulip with writer Jerome Charyn
- Bouncer, with Alejandro Jodorowsky

== Awards ==
- 1985: Prix de la critique at the Angoulême International Comics Festival, France
- 1986: Best French Comic at the Angoulême International Comics Festival
- 1992: nominated for Best German-language Comic/Comic-related Publication at the Max & Moritz Prizes, Germany
- 1996: nominated for Best Drawing at the Haxtur Awards, Spain
- 1998: Grand Prix de la ville d'Angoulême, France
- 1999: nominated for Best Short Comic Strip at the Haxtur Awards
- 2001: nominated for the Humour Award at the Angoulême International Comics Festival
- 2002: nominated for the Canal BD Award at the Angoulême International Comics Festival
- 2003:
  - nominated for the Audience Award at the Angoulême International Comics Festival
  - La Plumilla de Plata (The silver inkpen) in Mexico.
- 2004:
  - nominated for the Audience Award and the Series Award at the Angoulême International Comics Festival
  - nominated for Best international series at the Prix Saint-Michel, Belgium
- 2006:
  - Award for Best Drawing at the Albert Uderzo Awards
  - nominated for the Audience Award and the Series Award at the Angoulême International Comics Festival
- 2008: nominated for Best Artwork at the Prix Saint-Michel
- 2010: nominated for Best French Language Comic at the Prix Saint-Michel
- 2012: Award for Best Artwork at the Prix Saint Michel
