= Didier Comès =

Belgian comics artist

- Born: Dieter Hermann Comès; 11 December 1942 Sourbrodt, Belgium
- Died: 7 March 2013 (aged 70)
- Area: Writer
- Notable works: Le Dieu vivant Ergün l'errant Silence

Didier Comès (11 December 1942 – 7 March 2013) was a Belgian comics artist, best known for his graphic novels published in the magazine (À Suivre).

== Biography ==
Didier Comès was born as Dieter Hermann Comès in Sourbrodt in 1942. Growing up in a small village in the Hautes Fagnes with a German-speaking father and a French-speaking mother, he defines himself as a "bastard of two cultures". He left school at 16 to start working as an industrial artist in a factory in Verviers, making his debut in the newspaper Le Soir with the comic strip Hermann in 1969. Four years later he made his first typical long story, Le Dieu vivant, the first part of the series Ergün l'errant, for the Franco-Belgian comics magazine Pilote. In this story, like in most of his later work, the cinematic images take precedence over the story, which is fantastic, and centers around death and mythology.

His breakthrough followed with Silence, a harrowing story featuring a mute boy in the Ardennes after World War II. All these elements, war, mythology, troubled relations, witchcraft, animals, and death, often placed in the Ardennes, the region where he is born and lived, are recurring themes in most of his later graphic novels, long unrelated stories in black and white. Comès was early on influenced by fellow Ardennais comic artists René Hausman and Paul Deliège, and would later become friends with his example Hugo Pratt.

He died, aged 70, in March 2013.

== Bibliography ==
Series	Years	Volumes	Editor
Ergün l'errant	1974-1981	2	Casterman and Dargaud
Silence	1980	1	Casterman
L'Ombre du corbeau	1981	1	Le Lombard
La Belette	1983	1	Casterman
Eva	1985	1	Casterman
L'arbre-coeur	1988	1	Casterman
Iris	1991	1	Casterman
La Maison ou rêvent les arbres	1995	1	Casterman
Les larmes du tigre	2000	1	Casterman
Dix de der	2006	1	Casterman

== Awards ==
- 1980: Grand Prix Saint-Michel, Brussels, Belgium

- Yellow Kid for best foreign artist at the Festival of Lucca, Italy

- 1981: Best Comic Book at the Angoulême International Comics Festival, France
- 1983: Best Comic at the Prix Saint-Michel

== Sources ==
- Béra, Michel; Denni, Michel; and Mellot, Philippe (1998): "Trésors de la Bande Dessinée 1999–2000". Paris, Les éditions de l'amateur. ISBN 2-85917-258-0
