= Florence Cestac =

French cartoonist and former publisher

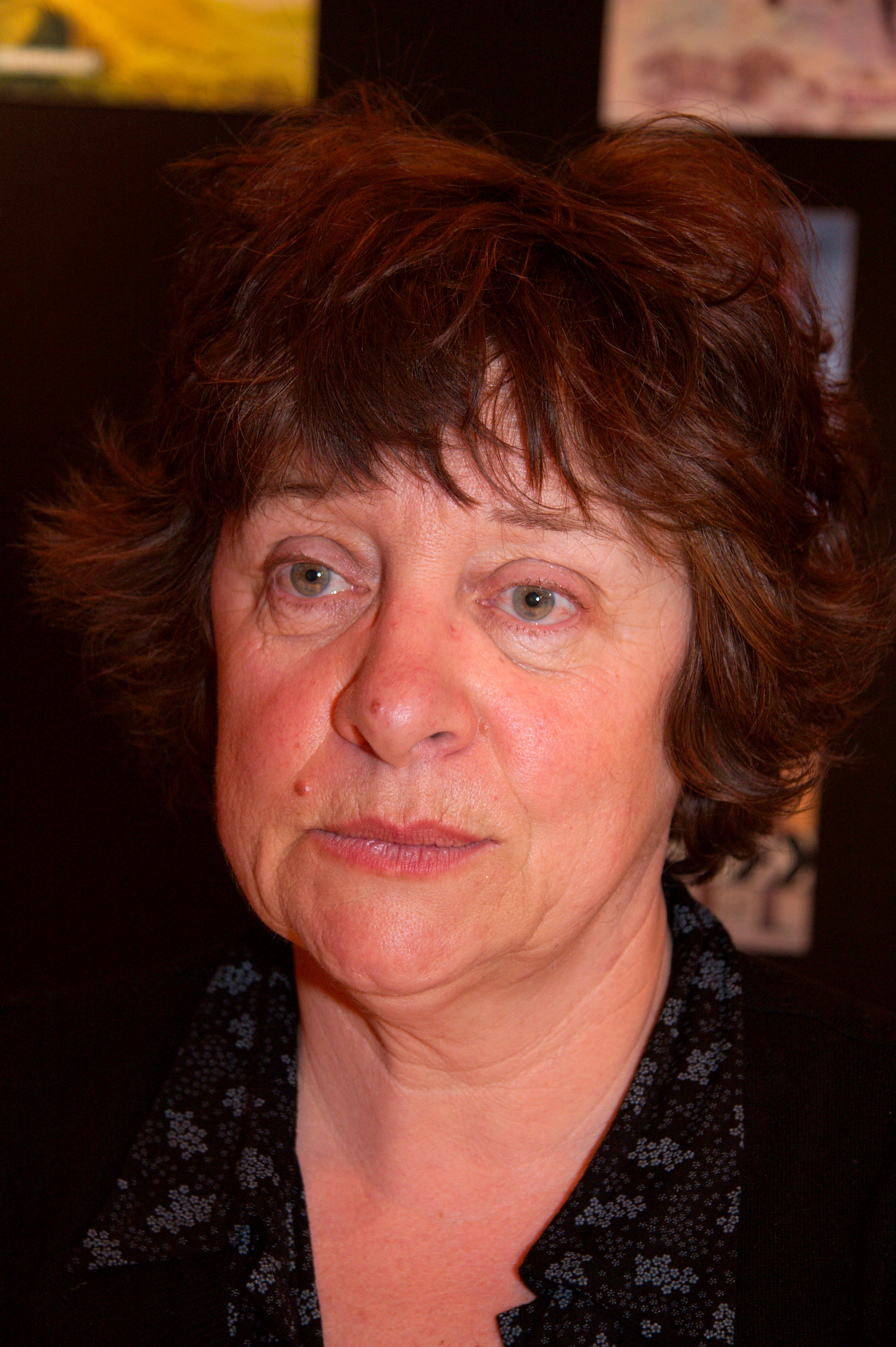
Florence Cestac in 2008

Florence Cestac (born 18 July 1949) is a French cartoonist and former publisher. She is the first woman to have won the prestigious Grand Prix de la ville d'Angoulême, in 2000, and was the only one until Rumiko Takahashi in 2019.

== Career ==
Born in Pont-Audemer, Cestac initially worked as an illustrator. In 1972, she took over the bookstore "Futuropolis" with her husband Étienne Robial, and transformed it into the comics publisher Futuropolis.

She created the humorous detective stories of Harry Mickson for the comics magazines L'Écho des savanes, Charlie Mensuel, Pilote and Ah ! Nana. After Futuropolis was bought by Gallimard in 1994, she created the series Les Déblok for Le Journal de Mickey, working with Nathalie Roques.

Her series Cestac pour les grands, aimed at an adult audience, brought her popular success and recognition. One album, Le Démon de midi (1996), was adapted for the stage and as the 2005 film The Demon Stirs.

== Awards ==
- 1989: Alph-Art humour, festival d'Angoulême, for Harry Mickson vol. 5
- 1997: Alph-Art humour for Le Démon de midi
- 2000: Grand Prix de la ville d'Angoulême
- 2014: Grand Prix Saint-Michel

== Books ==
- Harry Mickson (1979-1988)
- Les Déblok (1994-2002) with Nathalie Roques
- Le Démon de midi (1996)
- Le Démon d'après midi... (2005)
- Le Démon du soir (2013)
- Les Ados (2006-2010)
- La Véritable Histoire de Futuropolis (2007)
- Je voudrais me suicider mais j'ai pas le temps (2009) written by Jean Teulé. Biographical graphic novel about the comics artist Charlie Schlingo
- Des salopes et des anges (2011) written by Tonino Benacquista
- Un amour exemplaire (2015) written by Daniel Pennac
- Un papa, une maman, une famille formidable (la mienne !) (2021)
