= Le Cahier bleu =

1994 French comic book

Le Cahier bleu is a bande dessinée album created by André Juillard in 1994. It is divided into three chapters. A sequel, Après la pluie, was published in 1998.

== Story ==
Chapter 1 tells the story of two friends, Victor and Armand, who see a young lady, Louise, in her flat whilst the Paris Metro broke down just outside. They immediately fall in love with her. However whilst Armand meets her soon after seeing her, Victor does not meet her until later in the chapter. Having met her later on, he then gets acquainted with her. Chapter 1 ends by Louise discovering a diary, Le Cahier bleu, in her post box.

Chapter 2 is a re-run of events from chapter 1, except there is one major difference - the reader discovers that Victor has been cataloguing all the events of chapter 1 in his diary (which is the one that Louise finds at the end of chapter 1 - her discovering the diary was not Victor's intention - he did not put it in her postbox). It transpires that Victor has followed her during chapter 1 - Juilliard has used a paralipsis, in that Victor was there all along during chapter 1, but was just outside the diegesis. Chapter 2 ends with Louise having finished reading the diary.

Chapter 3, opens with Pauline, Louise's older sister, and Victor in the Juge d'Instruction's. It has turned out that Armand has died and that Victor is a possible suspect for his death. Louise's reaction to the diary is one of anger - she cannot believe that Victor would do such a thing as create a diary of all he did with her. Victor thinks all is well between Louise and him, however her reaction is a negative one. Victor asks Louise's older sister, Pauline, why Louise reacted in that way. Pauline, having read the diary, does not think it is as bad as Louise thinks, nevertheless, Pauline advises Victor to forget about Louise.

There is then a flashback to the time when Victor works out that Armand was the one responsible for Louise discovering the diary - at the end of meeting up with Victor at Victor's flat, Victor put a bag of rubbish out which contained the diary. It is clear from here that Armand took it and planted the diary, so that Louise would take it. The question of why Armand would betray his friend is raised - it is because Armand discovers that his love rival for Louise is Victor.

Victor then storms to Armand's flat and confronts him about planting the diary in Louise's post box. They break out into a fight. After this, Victor then goes. Elena, a friend of Armand who was in Armand's flat at the time of the fight, runs after Victor, talking about the diary.

Back to the present day, it turns out that Victor has in jail, under suspicion of killing Armand, however Elena acts as Victor's alibi, thus clearing him of Armand's death - it transpires that Armand died accidentally. Through this evidence, Victor is released without charge.

At the same time as being released, Louise is rushing to meet him, thus she could have had second thoughts about him. However, when she gets to the prison, it turns out that she is too late - Victor is walking off with Elena when she gets there.

== Awards ==
- 1995: Angoulême International Comics Festival Award for the best French comic of the year, France

- Special prize of the jury in Sierre, Switzerland
- Prize of the Festival of Charleroi, Belgium

- 2000: After the rain, the English translation of the sequel Après la pluie, is nominated for a Harvey Award for best foreign material
