= Auke Hulst =

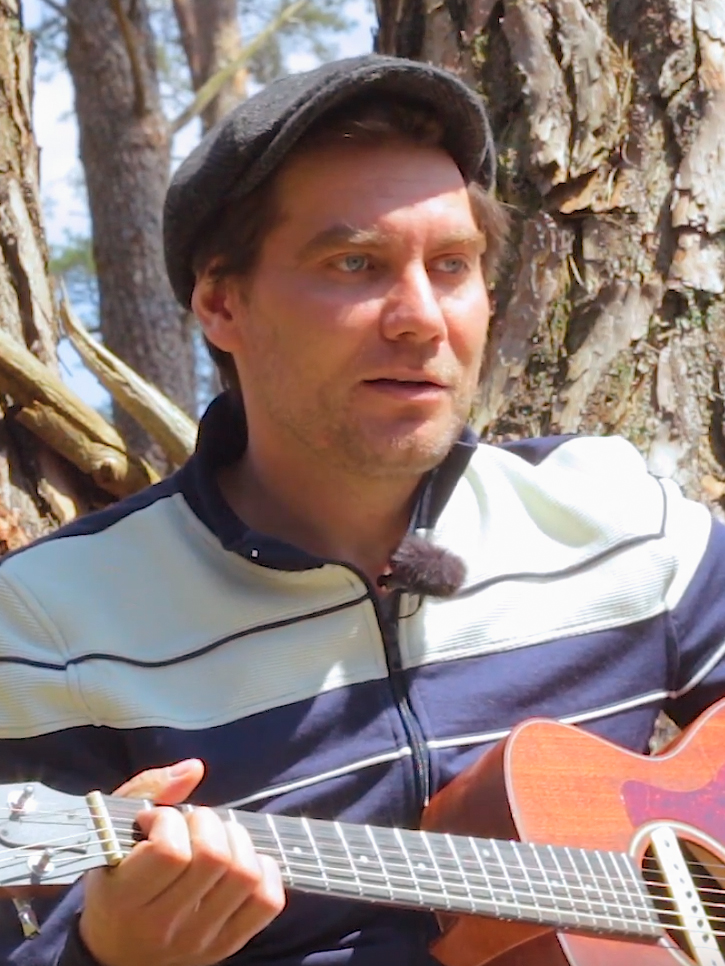
- Auke Hulst (2017)

Background information
- Birth name: Auke Anthony Hulst
- Born: 20 May 1975 (age 49); Hoogezand-Sappemeer, Groningen Province
- Origin: Hoogezand-Sappemeer, The Netherlands
- Genres: Singer-songwriter, pop, rock, jazz
- Occupation(s): Novelist, musician
- Instrument(s): Vocals, guitar, piano, bass, keyboards, programming
- Labels: SBP, Silvox, Meulenhoff
- Website: official website

Auke Anthony Hulst (born 20 May 1975) is a Dutch novelist, journalist and musician.

== Biography ==
Hulst was raised in the hamlet of Denemarken (meaning: Denmark), in the north of the Netherlands. After a disorganized upbringing he studied audiovisual arts, Dutch literature and English at the University of Groningen. He did not finish any of these studies.

From 1998 on Hulst has been working for a number of prominent Dutch and Belgian newspapers and magazines, like Vrij Nederland, Esquire, Knack Focus, NRC Handelsblad, De Groene Amsterdammer, and De Standaard. In 2006 he made his literary debut with the novel Jij en ik en alles daartussenin (translation: You and me and everything in between.) In 2007 he produced, together with cartoonist Raoul Deleo, a hybrid between literary non-fiction and graphic novel, called De eenzame snelweg (translation: The lonely highway). It's the impressionistic story of a cross-country trip the authors made, commemorating fifty years of On the Road by Jack Kerouac. The book was nominated for a stripschap-penning and the Prix Saint-Michel.

In May 2009 Hulst publishes Wolfskleren (translation: Wolf's Clothes), a novel that coincides with a rock-album by Hulst's Sponsored by Prozac-project. Hulst also is one of the main drivers behind the Dutch-language band De Meisjes.

In 2012 his semi-autobiographical novel Kinderen van het Ruige Land (translation: Children of the Savage Land) was published to both critical and commercial acclaim, winning several smaller literary awards. After his publisher Meulenhoff failed to submit the book for both the Libris and Gouden Boekenuil-awards, two of the most important literary accolades for Dutch writers, Hulst changed publishers. At Anthos he published the travel book Buitenwereld, binnenzee (2014, translation: Outside World, Inner Sea) and the novels Slaap zacht, Johnny Idaho (2015, trans: Sleep Tight, Johnny Idaho) and En ik herinner me Titus Broederland (2016, Brotherland), both of which were awarded the Harland Awards Book Prize. In 2017 he published the travel book Motel Songs, which was accompanied by the musical album of the same name. That book was awarded the Bob den Uyl Prize for Best Dutch travel book. In 2018 Hulst published the novel Zoeklicht op het gazon (trans: Searchlight on the Lawn), a psychological portrait of Richard Nixon. His most recent novel, De Mitsukoshi Troostbaby Company (2021, trans: The Mitsukoshi Consolation Baby Company) was shortlisted for the two major Dutch literary awards, the Libris Literatuurprijs and the Boekenbon Literatuurprijs. It was also shortlisted for the Belgian Confituur Boekhandelsprijs, and longlisted for the Belgian De Boon Literatuurprijs.

Together with Wim Melis, curator of the Noorderlicht photo festival in Groningen, Hulst has created the photobook The Pursuit of Happiness (2009). As editor and essayist he co-created the Noorderlicht-publications Warzone (2010), which was about the war experiences of soldiers on international missions, and The Sweet and Sour Story of Sugar (2013).
