= Jean-Marc Reiser =

French comics creator

Reiser
- Born: Jean-Marc Roeiser; 13 April 1941 Réhon, France
- Died: 5 November 1983 (aged 42) Paris, France
- Area: Cartoonist
- Pseudonyms: J.-M. Roussillon, Jiem (in his early career only)
- Notable works: Gros Dégueulasse; Vive les Femmes
- Awards: Full list

Signature
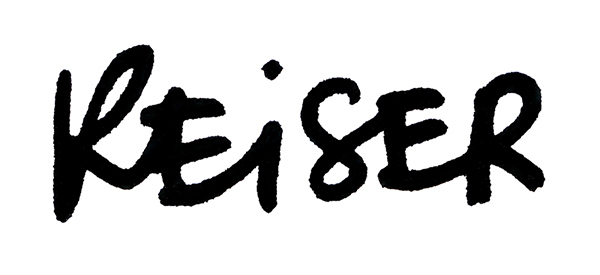

Jean-Marc Reiser (French: [ʁɛzɛʁ]; born Jean-Marc Roeiser; 13 April 1941 – 5 November 1983) was a French comics creator, notable for his black comedy and controversial contemporary satire.

== Biography ==
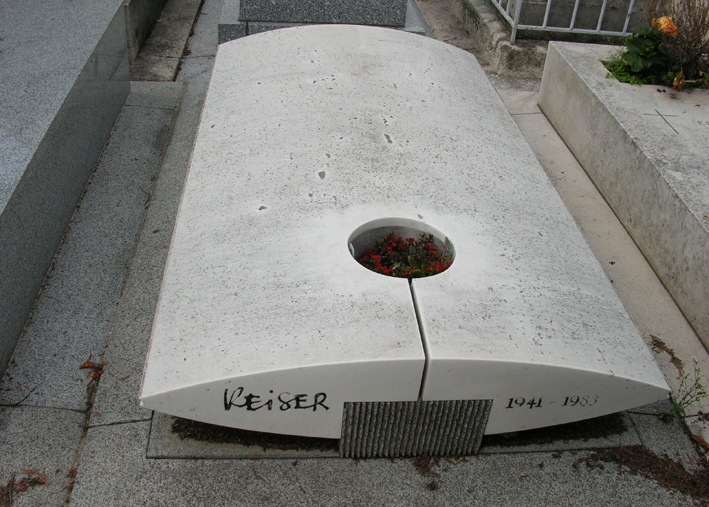
Reiser's tombstone at the Montparnasse Cemetery

A prolific cartoonist from 1959 until his death, Reiser made his debut in the publication La Gazette de Nectar for the Nicolas winery. His works are to this day controversial, with some people enthusiastically endorsing them, and others loathing them. At a 2004 exhibition of his works in the Centre Pompidou, the entrance displayed the warning "Beware! Some of the exhibited pictures could hurt the feelings of several visitors."

He founded the Franco-Belgian comics magazine Hara-Kiri in 1960 together with Fred and François Cavanna. Reiser was known to attack taboos of all kinds. Hara-Kiri was banned in 1970 by the French Minister of the Interior for mocking the just deceased Charles de Gaulle. Reiser subsequently published his drawings in the follow-up magazine Charlie Hebdo and several other publications. In 1978 he won the Grand Prix de la ville d'Angoulême. He died on 5 November 1983, in Paris, of bone cancer.

== Awards ==
- 1974 Prix Saint-Michel, for La vie au grand air
- 1978 Angoulême Festival, Grand Prix de la ville

== Selected bibliography ==
- Ils sont moches (Éditions du square, 1970)
- Mon Papa (Éditions du square, 1971)
- Je vous aime (Euréditions, 1971)
- La vie au grand air (Éditions du square, 1972)
- La vie des bêtes
- On vit une époque formidable
- Vive les femmes
- Vive les vacances
- Phantasmes
- Les copines
- Gros Dégueulasse (Reiser et Éditions Albin Michel, 1982)
- Fous d'amour

== Sources ==
- Reiser publications in Pilote, Charlie Mensuel, BD, L'Écho des savanes BDoubliées (in French)
- Reiser albums Bedetheque (in French)
