= Grand Prix de la ville d'Angoulême =

Franco-Belgian lifetime achievement award for comic artists

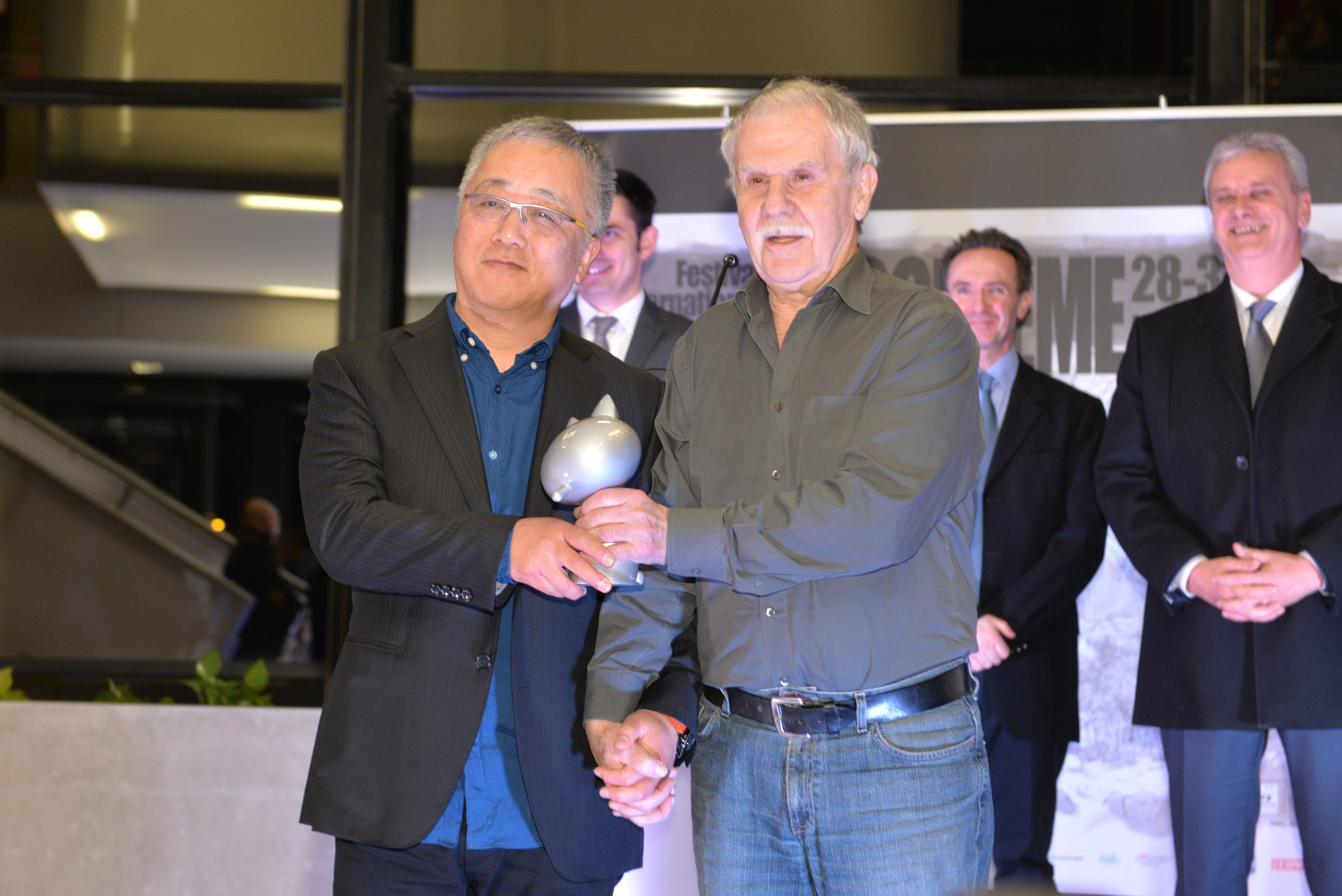
The previous year's recipient Katsuhiro Otomo (left), presenting Hermann Huppen with the Grand Prix de la ville d'Angoulême in 2016.

The Grand Prix de la ville d'Angoulême is a lifetime achievement award given annually during the Angoulême International Comics Festival to a comics author. Although not a monetary award, it is considered the most prestigious award in Franco-Belgian comics.

It has been awarded mainly to French and Belgian authors, but also to international authors. Recipients are, on average, 50 years old. Five women, Florence Cestac, Rumiko Takahashi, Julie Doucet, Posy Simmonds, and Anouk Ricard have been awarded the prize.

== History ==
The prize was first awarded during the first Angoulême festival in 1974. Traditionally, the winner has been selected as the president of the board and the prize jury of next year's festival. Since 1982, the winners have also drawn the next year's festival poster. In 1984, cartoonist Claire Bretécher received a special tenth anniversary award apart from the main prize, a practice since repeated on subsequent anniversaries.

After 1989, the prize was awarded by a jury of all previous winners, except for the time from 1997 to 1999 when all creators attending the festival voted on the winner. The jury system was criticized for favoring cronyism and Franco-centrism, and was abandoned after 2012. Subsequent years have seen a variety of changing award mechanisms. In 2015, the winner was again selected by vote of all registered comics creators, based on a list of nominees.

In January 2016, 12 of the 30 nominees for the 2016 prize withdrew their names from consideration in protest against a shortlist of exclusively male nominees. Following media reports, the festival's board first announced 6 additional female nominees, then retracted all nominees, allowing registered professionals to vote for any person.

== Winners ==
=== 1970s ===
- 1974 André Franquin (Gaston, Marsupilami, Spirou et Fantasio)
- 1975 Will Eisner (A Contract with God, The Dreamer, To the Heart of the Storm)
- 1976 René Pellos (René Pellarin) (sports cartoonist)
- 1977 Jijé (Joseph Gillain) (Spirou et Fantasio, Jerry Spring, Tanguy et Laverdure)
- 1978 Jean-Marc Reiser (cartoonist)
- 1979 Marijac (Jacques Dumas) (youth comics)

=== 1980s ===
- 1980 Fred (Othon Aristides)
- 1981 Moebius / Jean Giraud
- 1982 Paul Gillon
- 1983 Jean-Claude Forest
  - 10th anniversary Claire Bretécher
- 1984 Jean-Claude Mézières (Valérian and Laureline)
- 1985 Jacques Tardi
- 1986 Jacques Lob
- 1987 Enki Bilal
- 1988 Philippe Druillet
  - 15th anniversary Hugo Pratt
- 1989 René Pétillon

=== 1990s ===
- 1990 Max Cabanes
- 1991 Gotlib (Marcel Gotlieb)
- 1992 Frank Margerin
  - 20th anniversary Morris (Maurice de Bevere)
- 1993 Gérard Lauzier
- 1994 Nikita Mandryka
- 1995 Philippe Vuillemin
- 1996 André Juillard
- 1997 Daniel Goossens
- 1998 François Boucq
- 1999 Robert Crumb
  - Special prize of the millennium Albert Uderzo

=== 2000s ===
- 2000 Florence Cestac
- 2001 Martin Veyron
- 2002 François Schuiten
- 2003 Régis Loisel
- 2004 Zep (Philippe Chappuis)
  - 30th anniversary Joann Sfar
- 2005 Georges Wolinski
- 2006 Lewis Trondheim
- 2007 José Antonio Muñoz
- 2008 Dupuy and Berberian
- 2009 Blutch

=== 2010s ===
- 2010: Baru
- 2011: Art Spiegelman
- 2012: Jean-Claude Denis
- 2013: Bernard Willem Holtrop (Willem)
  - 40th anniversary Akira Toriyama
- 2014: Bill Watterson
- 2015: Katsuhiro Otomo
- 2016: Hermann Huppen
- 2017: Cosey (Bernard Cosendai)
- 2018: Richard Corben
- 2019: Rumiko Takahashi

=== 2020s ===
- 2020: Emmanuel Guibert
- 2021: Chris Ware
- 2022: Julie Doucet
- 2023: Riad Sattouf
- 2024: Posy Simmonds
- 2025: Anouk Ricard
