= Charel Cambré =

Belgian comics artist and author

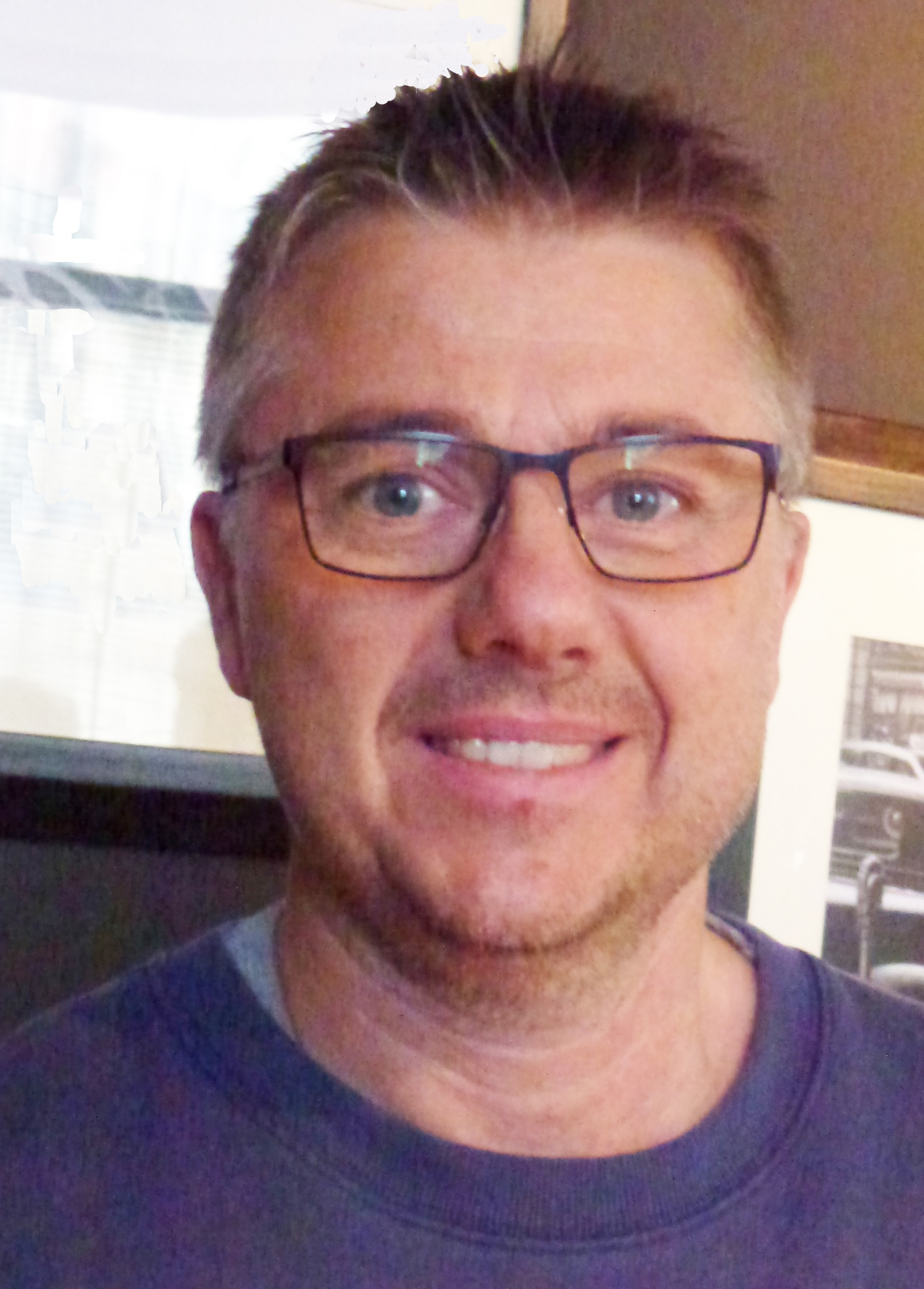
- Cambré in 2016
- Born: Carl Cambré; 27 April 1968 (age 57); Herenthout, Belgium
- Occupation: Author

Charel Cambré (born 27 April 1968 as Carl Cambré) is a Flemish Belgian comics artist and author.

== Biography ==
Carl Cambré was born in 1968 in Herenthout. After his studies at the art school of Lier and animation at the Royal Academy of Ghent, he worked in some foreign animation studies, before he started creating comics. He lives in Nieuwrode, a part of Holsbeek.

His first published comic was Streetkids in Suske & Wiske Weekblad, which appeared from 1993 until 2003. From 2005 on he worked for the Studio Vandersteen, while continuing to create his own series at the same time. He often works together with Marc Legendre, first on the Spike and Suzy spin-off series Amoras, and since 2017 on the Spirou et Fantasio spin-off Robbedoes Special, which marks the first time that Flemish authors have created an album in the iconic Franco-Belgian comic series.

Amoras was a limited series of six albums, and became one of the best-selling comics in Flanders, with nearly 500,000 copies sold by February 2015. It was continued with the prequel De Kronieken van Amoras, and the Belgian Comic Strip Center devoted in 2016 an exposition to the series.

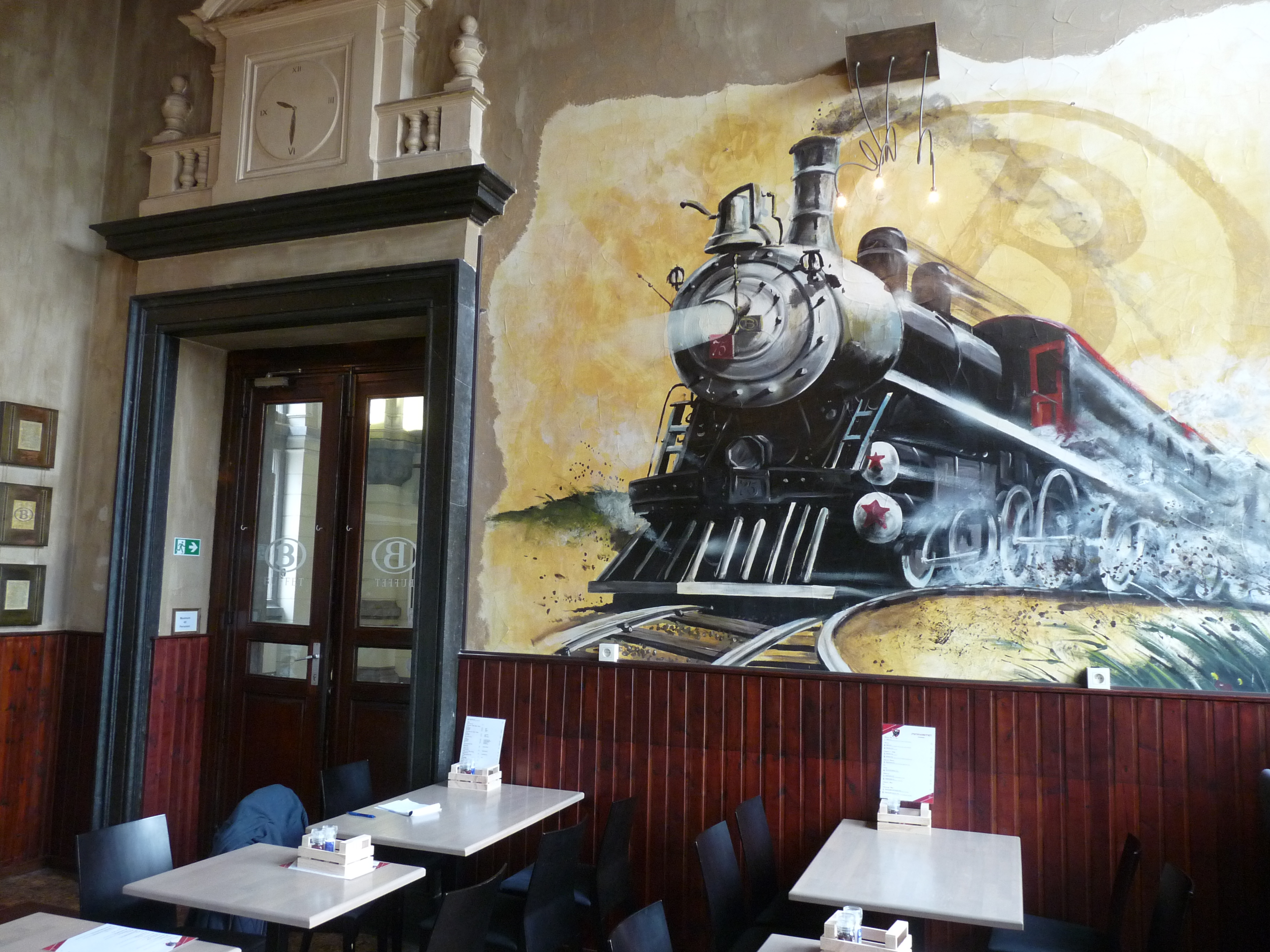
In his early years he also painted on walls. This one in 1998 in the railway station of Turnhout

== Bibliography ==
- 2002-2003: De Pfaffs: 2 albums, celebrity comic about the family of goalkeeper Jean-Marie Pfaff
- 2004-2007: Spring: 6 albums, derived from a Flemish TV series
- 2007-2009: Mega Mindy: 6 albums, derived from a Flemish TV series
- 2007-2016: Jump: 19 albums (translated in French)
- 2008-2013: Albert & Co: satirical comic series about Albert II of Belgium. 7 albums (translated in French)
- 2009-2010: The New Adventures of K3: 2 albums, about a famous Flemish band
- 2010-2013: BeeVee, 2 albums, cartoons about famous Flemish persons
- 2013-2016: Amoras: 6 albums, a spin-off of Spike and Suzy (with Marc Legendre): translated in French as Amphoria
- 2014-...: Filip van België, renamed Filip & Mathilde': 3 albums, continuation of Albert & Co after the abdication of Albert II of Belgium and the ascension of Philip of Belgium
- 2015-...: Pinanti United: 2 albums
- 2017-...: De Kronieken van Amoras: 1 album, a prequel to Amoras
- 2017-...: Robbedoes Special: 1 album, a spin-off of Spirou et Fantasio (with Marc Legendre)

== Awards ==
- 2014: Gouden Potlood for best comics artist from the Comics Festival of Middelkerke
- 2014: Fnac Award for best comic for Amoras #4
- 2015: Vandersteenprijs for best Dutch language comic for Amoras #5
