= René Hausman =

Belgian comics artist

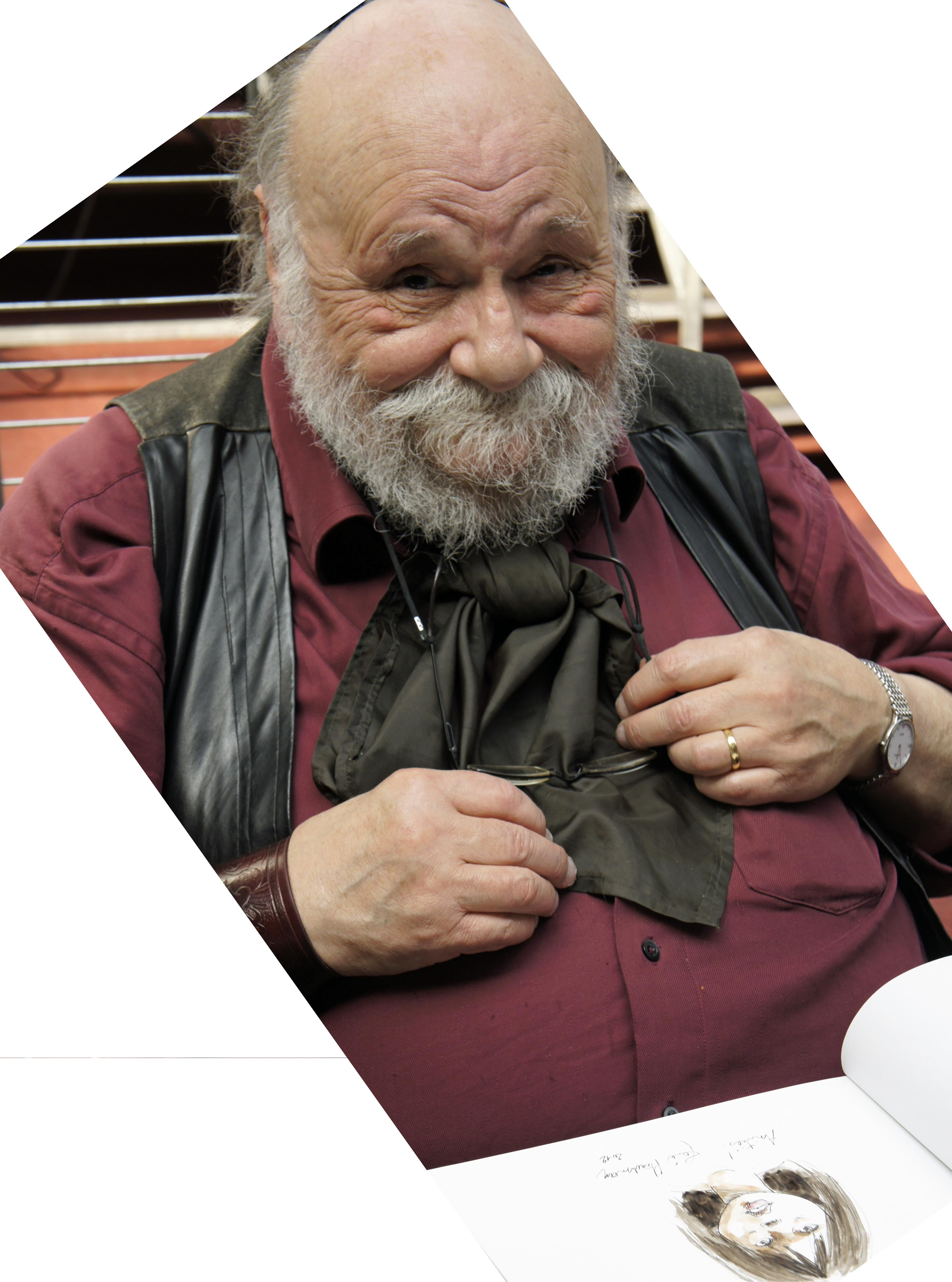
- Born: 21 February 1936 Verviers, Belgium
- Died: 28 April 2016 (aged 80) Antwerp, Belgium
- Areas: artist, writer
- Notable works: Laïyna

René Hausman (21 February 1936 – 28 April 2016) was a Belgian comic-book writer and artist, best known for his dark fairytales and watercolour drawings.

== Biography ==
René Hausman was born in Verviers, Belgium in 1936. After meeting already famed comics author Raymond Macherot when he was 18 years old, he quit his studies and made illustrations for local magazines. A few years later, he started working for Le Moustique, a family magazine from publisher Dupuis. From there, he moved to Spirou, the Franco-Belgian comics magazine of the same publisher, where he contributed in 1957 Saki et Zunie, his first comic, with a story by Yvan Delporte. In the following years, he provided more than 500 illustrations for the magazine, specializing in animals and local folklore, which earned him the nickname "Bard of the Ardennes".

In the following decades, he widened his oeuvre to more adult comics, including erotic fables in the French magazine Fluide Glacial, but he got his major breakthrough in 1985 when he created Laïyna, a fairy story in two parts, the first of which was published as a supplement to Spirou in one week. It became a few years later the first album in Aire Libre, the new graphic novels collection of Dupuis. He later made three more comics for the same series.

Also known as a sculptor and a bagpipe player, Hausman never had a major commercial success but got wide recognition for his use of colours and the use of the fantastic in his stories. All his stories feature nature and animals, and Hausman himself has lived for all his life in the country. He has been a major influence on many younger Franco-Belgian comics artists, including Frank Pé and Didier Comès. In 1995, he was made an honorary citizen of the city of Durbuy.

== Bibliography ==
This bibliography only mentions the comics by Hausman which have been published as an album, and does for the moment not include his book illustrations, magazine illustrations, and music album covers.

Series	Years	Volumes	Story	Editor	Remarks
Saki et Zunie	1980–1998	3	Yvan Delporte	Ed. Chlorophylle and Noir Dessin	Originally started in 1957
Laïyna	1987–1988	2	Pierre Dubois	Dupuis	
Allez coucher, sales bêtes!	1991	1	Yann, Marcel Gotlieb, Christian Binet, Yvan Delporte, ...	Dupuis	
Les trois cheveux blancs	1993	1	Yann	Dupuis	
Le Prince des Ecureuils	1998	1	Yann	Dupuis	
Les chasseurs de l'aube	2003	1	René Hausman	Dupuis	
La Grande Tambouille des Fées	2003	1	Michel Rodrigue	Au bord des continents	

Apart from publications in French and Dutch, his comics also have been translated into German, Spanish and Swedish.

Hausman has also designed different stamps for the Belgian Post, illustrating native animals of the Ardennes. His stamp for the Horses Procession in Opwijk was even praised as the best Belgian stamp of 2002.

== Sources ==
- Béra, Michel; Denni, Michel; and Mellot, Philippe (2002): "Trésors de la Bande Dessinée 2003–2004". Paris, Les éditions de l'amateur. ISBN 2-85917-357-9
