= Bernard Hislaire =

Belgian comic book creator (born 1957)

- Born: 11 January 1957 (age 69) Brussels
- Areas: Writer, Artist
- Pseudonyms: Sylaire, Yslaire

Bernard Hislaire (born 11 January 1957) is a Belgian comics artist. He is also known as Sylaire and as Yslaire, his current artist name.

== Biography ==
Bernard Hislaire was born in 1957 in Brussels, Belgium. Passionate about comics since he was very young, he produced his first drawings in the Robidule fanzine, and worked on his style at the Institut Saint-Luc in Brussels. At the age of 18, he joined the drawing team of the Spirou magazine, where he published a story in the section dedicated to young creators. Soon, he began a 16-page story, Le Troisième Laron. He was then supported by the best known scenarists of Dupuis, such as Raoul Cauvin and Jean-Marie Brouyère, with whom he realised various series including Coursensac et Baladin. In 1978 he launched his own characters in the Spirou magazine, Bidouille et Violette, which continued until 1985, achieving considerable success with the public. Meanwhile, he also published humorous drawings in La Libre Belgique and the Spirou supplement Le Trombone Illustré.

In 1986, after having met the scenarist Balac, he created Sambre, a 19th-century saga, about an impossible love story between Bernard Sambre, a rich young man, and Julie, a farmer girl, during the 1848 revolution in France. This series was original because the graphical style used in these albums is different from the one Hislaire used before, and because the number of colours used is very restricted and centered on red. This was the first publication on which he used the name Yslaire. The whole series was published by Glénat and was a critical and commercial success.

In 1997 he surprised his fans again with the release of Mémoires du XXe ciel: 98, later renamed XXe ciel.com: Mémoires98 after it changed publishers as well as some of its content. In 2001, the sequel, Mémoires99 was released. XXe ciel.com has as its central theme the existence of angels.

Hislaire has also written scripts for other artists, both under his own name and as Yslaire. Some of these works were Trois vierges for Boccar and Le Gang Mazda for Darasse.

== Bibliography ==
- Bidouille et Violette (Dupuis, 1981–1986)
  - les Premiers Mots (1981)
  - les Jours sombres (1982)
  - la Reine des glaces (1984)
  - la Ville de tous les jours (1986)
- Sambre (Glénat, 1986–2003)
  - Plus ne m'est rien (1986, republished in 2003)
  - Je sais que tu viendras (1990, republished in 2003)
  - Faut-il que nous mourrions ensemble ? (1990, republished in 2003)
  - Liberté, liberté... (1993, republished in 2003)
  - Maudit soit le fruit de ses entrailles (2003)
- Le Gang Mazda (Dupuis, 1988–1997); script assistance, art by Darasse
- Mémoires du XXe ciel then XXe ciel.com (Delcourt then Les Humanoïdes Associés, 1997–2004)
  - Introduction au XXe ciel (Dargaud, 1997)
  - 98 (Dargaud, 1999)
  - Mémoires98 (Les Humanoïdes Associés, 2000)
  - Mémoires99 (Les Humanoïdes Associés, 2001)
  - Mémoires<19>00 (Les Humanoïdes Associés, 2004)
  - Mémoires<20>00 (Les Humanoïdes Associés, 2004)
- Cousensac et Baladin (Point image, 2002)
  - Au pays de Tahétéhus (2002)
- Trois vierges (Glénat, 2003); writing, art by Jeanlouis Boccar
  - Trois vierges: Dyane (2003)
  - Trois vierges: Atena (2006)
- Le Ciel au dessus de Bruxelles (2006–2007)
  - [Avant]... (Futuropolis, 2006)
  - [Après]... (Futuropolis, 2007)
- Sambre - La guerre des Sambre (Futuropolis/Glénat, 2007–2008); writing, art by Jean Bastide and Vincent Mézil

== Awards ==
- 1979: Best Comical Story at the Prix Saint-Michel, Brussels, Belgium
- 1986: Grand Prix St-Michel at the Prix Saint-Michel
- 1987: Libération Award at the Angoulême International Comics Festival, France
- 1998: Best Drawing at the Haxtur Awards, Spain

- nominated for Best Long Comic Strip and Best Script at the Haxtur Awards

- 2004: nominated for the Audience Award and the Best Series Award at the Angoulême International Comics Festival
- 2004: nominated for Best International Series at the Prix Saint-Michel
- 2006: Best Story at the Prix Saint Michel

- nominated for Best Artwork at the Prix Saint-Michel
- nominated for Best Adult Album at the Albert Uderzo Awards, France

- 2007: nominated for best artwork at the Prix Saint-Michel
- 2011: Best Comic (French language) at the Prix Saint-Michel
