= Cosey (cartoonist) =

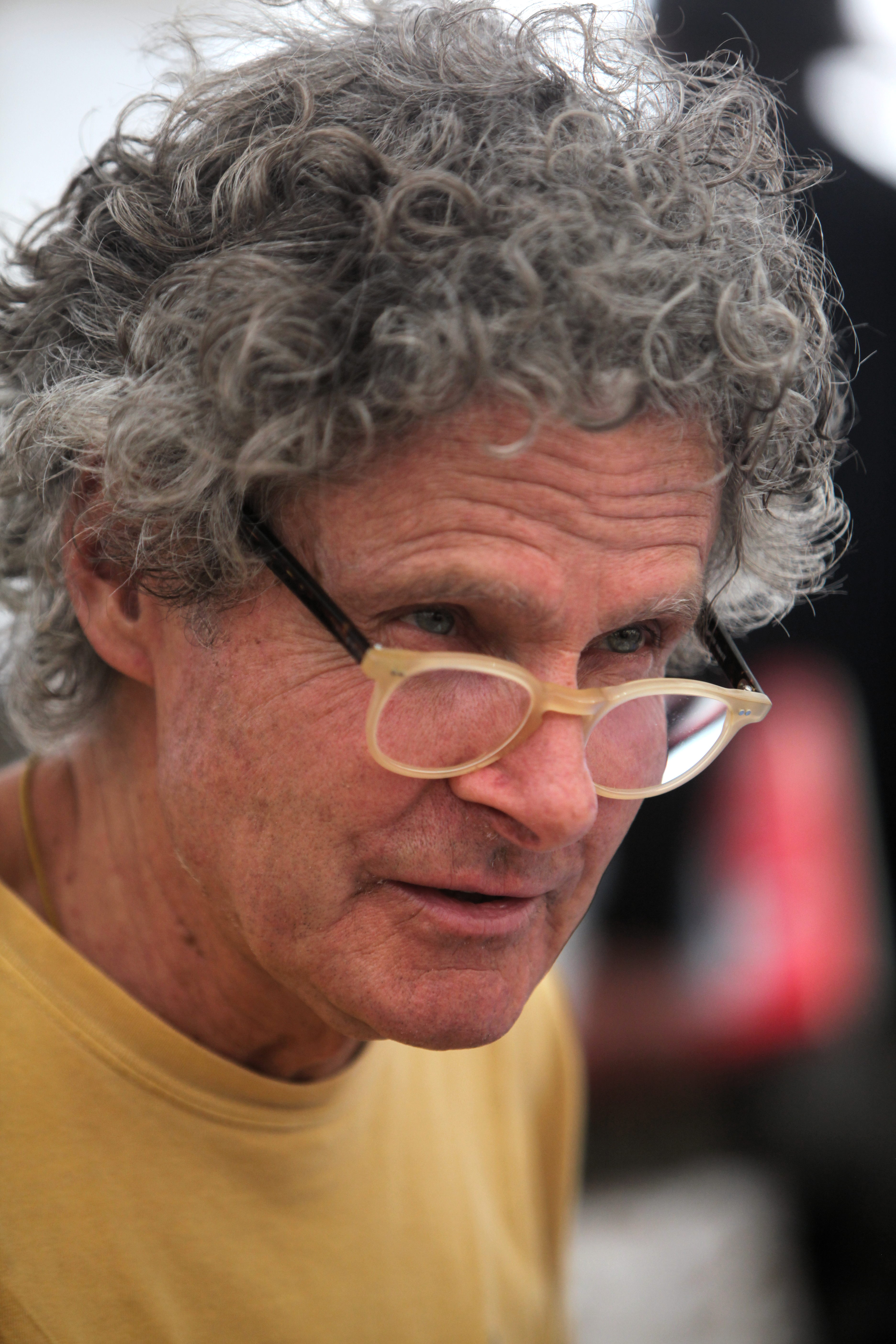
- Cosey, in 2021
- Born: Bernard Cosendai; 1950 (age 75–76) Lausanne, Switzerland
- Notable works: Jonathan
- Awards: Angoulême International Comics Festival Prize for Best Album; Max und Moritz Award; Grand Prix de la ville d'Angoulême

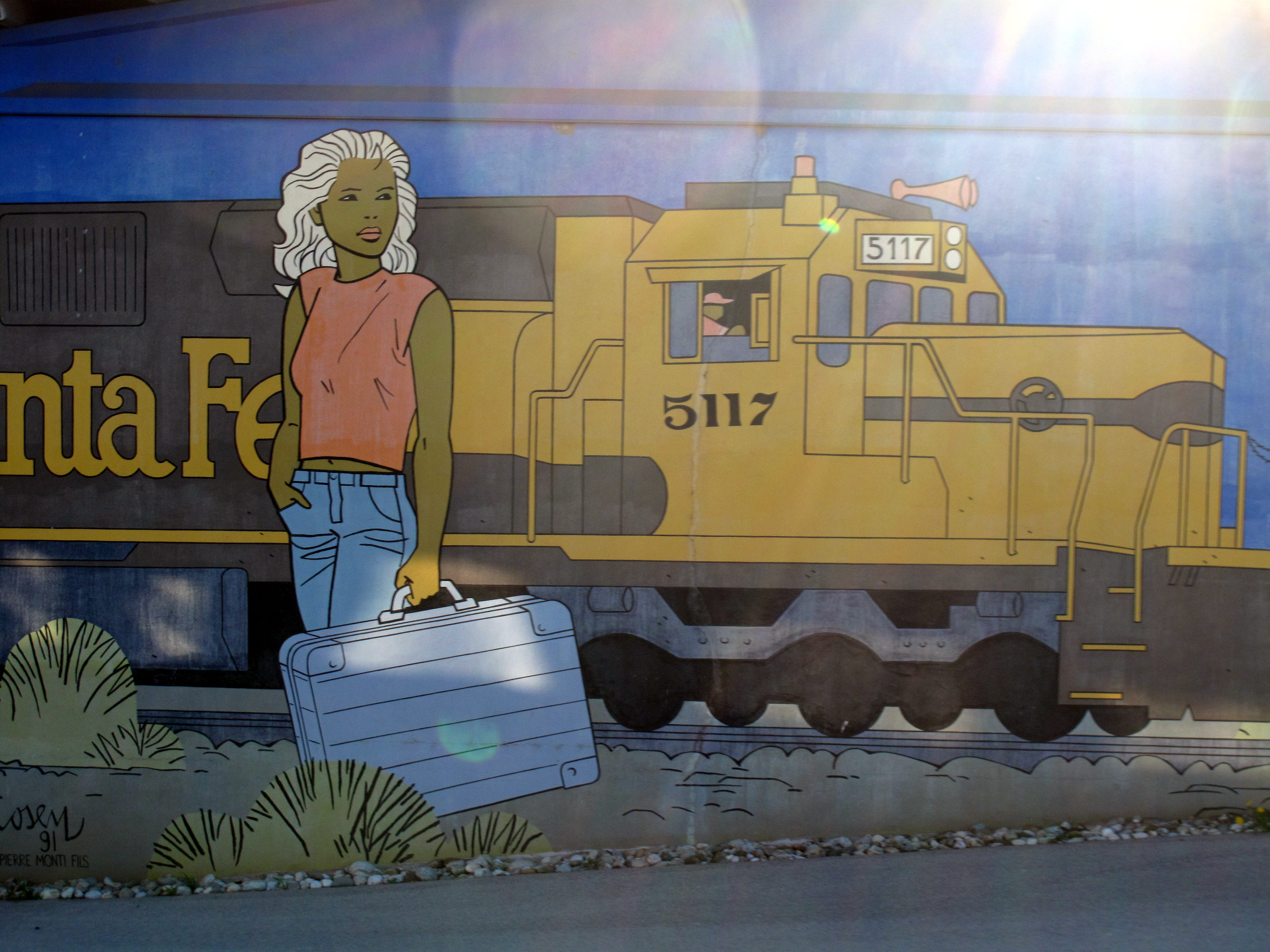
Mural by Cosey decorating a hangar near Morges railway station, in Switzerland.

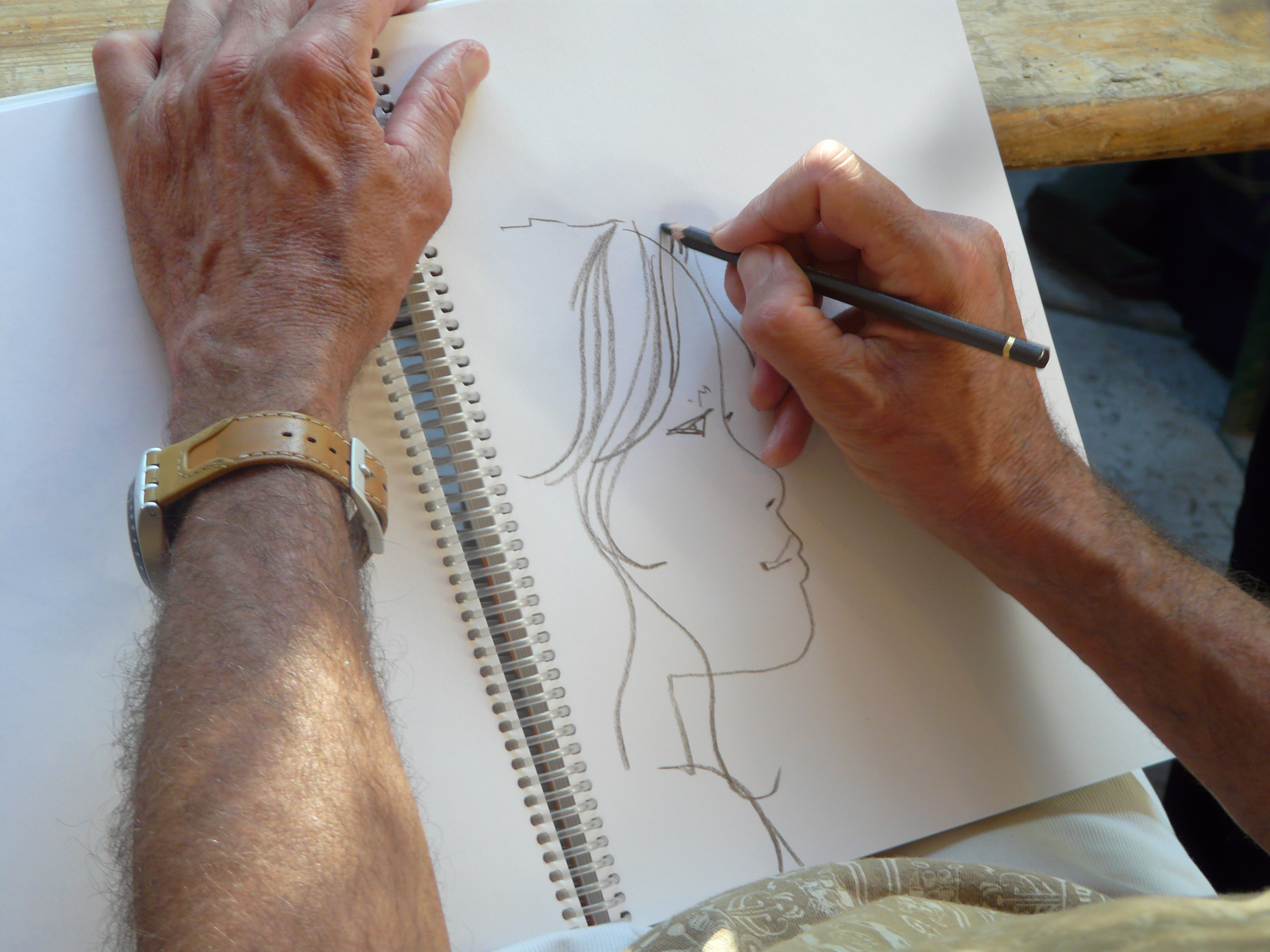
Photographs of Cosey drawing.

Bernard Cosendai (born 1950), known by the pen name Cosey, is a Swiss cartoonist.

== Biography ==
Cosey is born in 1950 at Lausanne. In 1966, he began working for advertisement. In 1970 he met Derib, who was at this time the only cartoonist in Romandy, and he became his apprentice. Since 1972, he created comics series Paul Aroïd, Clarence and Séraphin Ledoux for Swiss newspaper 24 heures.

In 1975, he began his serie Jonathan in the comics magazine Tintin. This serie is his major work, and became "a cult serie" ("une série devenue culte"). Completed in 2021, including 17 albums, it tells the story of a young man with amnesia who travels in Asia, especially in Tibet.

Cosey is also the author of graphic novels, such as À la recherche de Peter Pan, published as a diptych in 1983 and 1984.

In 2017, Cosey was awarded the Grand Prix de la ville d'Angoulême.

== Selected bibliography ==
- Un shampooing pour la couronne – Une Aventure de Clarence, Publishing & Copyright, 1974.
- Jonathan, Le Lombard, 17 albums, 1975-2021 :
  - Souviens-toi, Jonathan, 1977
  - Et la montagne chantera pour toi, 1977
  - Pieds nus sous les rhododendrons, 1977
  - Le Berceau du Bodhisattva, 1979
  - L'Espace bleu entre les nuages, 1980
  - Douniacha, il y a longtemps..., 1980
  - Kate, 1981
    - Angoulême International Comics Festival Prize for Best Album 1982
  - Le Privilège du serpent, 1982
  - Neal et Sylvester, 1983
  - Oncle Howard est de retour, 1985
  - Greyshore Island, 1986
  - Celui qui mène les fleuves à la mer, 1997
  - La Saveur du Songrong, 2001
  - Elle ou dix mille lucioles, 2008
  - Atsuko, 2011
  - Celle qui fut, 2013
  - La Piste de Yéshé, 2021
- À la recherche de Peter Pan, Le Lombard, collection « Histoires et Légendes » :
  - À la recherche de Peter Pan 1, 1984
  - À la recherche de Peter Pan 2, 1985
    - Max und Moritz Award for best German-language comic 1988
- Le Voyage en Italie, Dupuis, coll. « Aire libre », 2 volumes, 1988
- Orchidea, Dupuis, coll. « Aire Libre », 1990
- Saigon - Hanoï, Dupuis, coll. « Aire Libre », 1992
- Zélie Nord - Sud, Le Lombard, coll. « Signés », 1994
- Joyeux Noël, May !, Dupuis, coll. « Aire Libre », 1995
- Zeke raconte des histoires, Dupuis, coll. « Aire Libre », 1999
- Une maison de Frank L. Wright, Dupuis, coll. « Aire Libre », 2003
- Le Bouddha d'azur, Dupuis, coll. « Empreinte(s) » :
  - Tome 1, 2005.
  - Tome 2, 2006.
- Calypso, Futuropolis, octobre 2017.
