= André Juillard =

French comics creator (1948–2024)

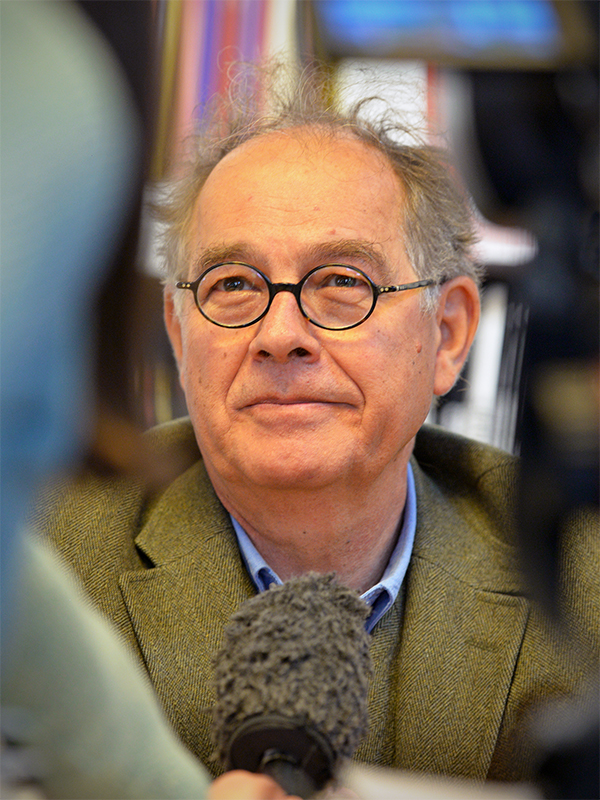
- Juillard in 2014
- Born: 9 June 1948 Paris, France
- Died: 31 July 2024 (aged 76)
- Area: Artist
- Notable works: Les Sept Vies de l'Épervier; Arno; Blake and Mortimer
- Awards: full list

André Juillard (9 June 1948 – 31 July 2024) was a French comics artist.

== Biography ==
Born in Paris, Juillard was one of the most prolific artists of historical comics in France. His career began in 1974. After studies in the School of Decorative Arts of Paris (l'école des Arts décoratifs de Paris), Juillard started in the popular magazine Formule 1, drawing La Longue Piste de Loup Gris, a Western story with scenario by Claude Verrien. He then adapted Roméo et Juliette for the magazine Djin. In 1976, he began his first long series, featuring the knight Bohémond de Saint-Gilles, based on a text written by Verrien, published in Formule 1. During this period he also started Isabelle Fantouri based on texts by Josselin, for Djin, as well as Les Cathares with Didier Conrad for the same publication.

Juillard died on 31 July 2024, at the age of 76.

== Bibliography ==
- Bohémond de Saint Gilles (1979–1983)
1. Les chevaliers du désert
2. Sortilèges à Malte
3. Duel en Sicile
4. L'or des croisés
- Cheminot (1982)
- Les Cathares (1982)
- Arno (1983–1997)
1. Le Pique rouge
2. L'Œil de Kéops
3. Le Puits nubien

Le maître des oiseaux, cover of 5th issue of the Les 7 vies de l'épervier series.

- Les Sept vies de l'Epervier (1983–1991)
1. La blanche morte
2. Le temps des chiens
3. L'arbre de mai
4. Hyronimus
5. Le maître des oiseaux
6. La part du diable
7. La marque du Condor
- Chasseurs d'or (1987)
- Masquerouge (1988–2004)
- Le Cahier bleu (1994)
- Plume aux vents (1995–2002)
1. La folle et l'assassin
2. L'oiseau-tonnerre
3. Beau-Ténébreux
4. Ni Dieu ni diable
- Après la pluie (1998)
- Blake & Mortimer (2000-2024)
1. La Machination Voronov (2000)
2. Les Sarcophages du 6e Continent vol 1 (2003)
3. Les Sarcophages du 6e Continent vol 2 (2004)
4. Le Sanctuaire du Gondwana (2008)
5. Le Serment des Cinq Lords (2012)
6. Le Bâton de Plutarque (2014)
7. Le Testament de William S. (2016)
8. Signé Olrik (2024)

== Awards ==
- 1995: Award for Best Album at the Angoulême International Comics Festival, France
- 1996: Grand Prix de la ville d'Angoulême, France
- 1997: nominated for Best Cover at the Haxtur Awards, Spain
- 2000: Best Short Comic Strip at the Haxtur Awards

- nomination for the Harvey Award for Best American Edition of Foreign Material, U.S.

- 2006: nominated for the Grand Prix Saint-Michel, Belgium
- 2007: nominated for the Grand Prix Saint-Michel, Belgium
