= Yves Swolfs =

Belgian comic book writer and artist

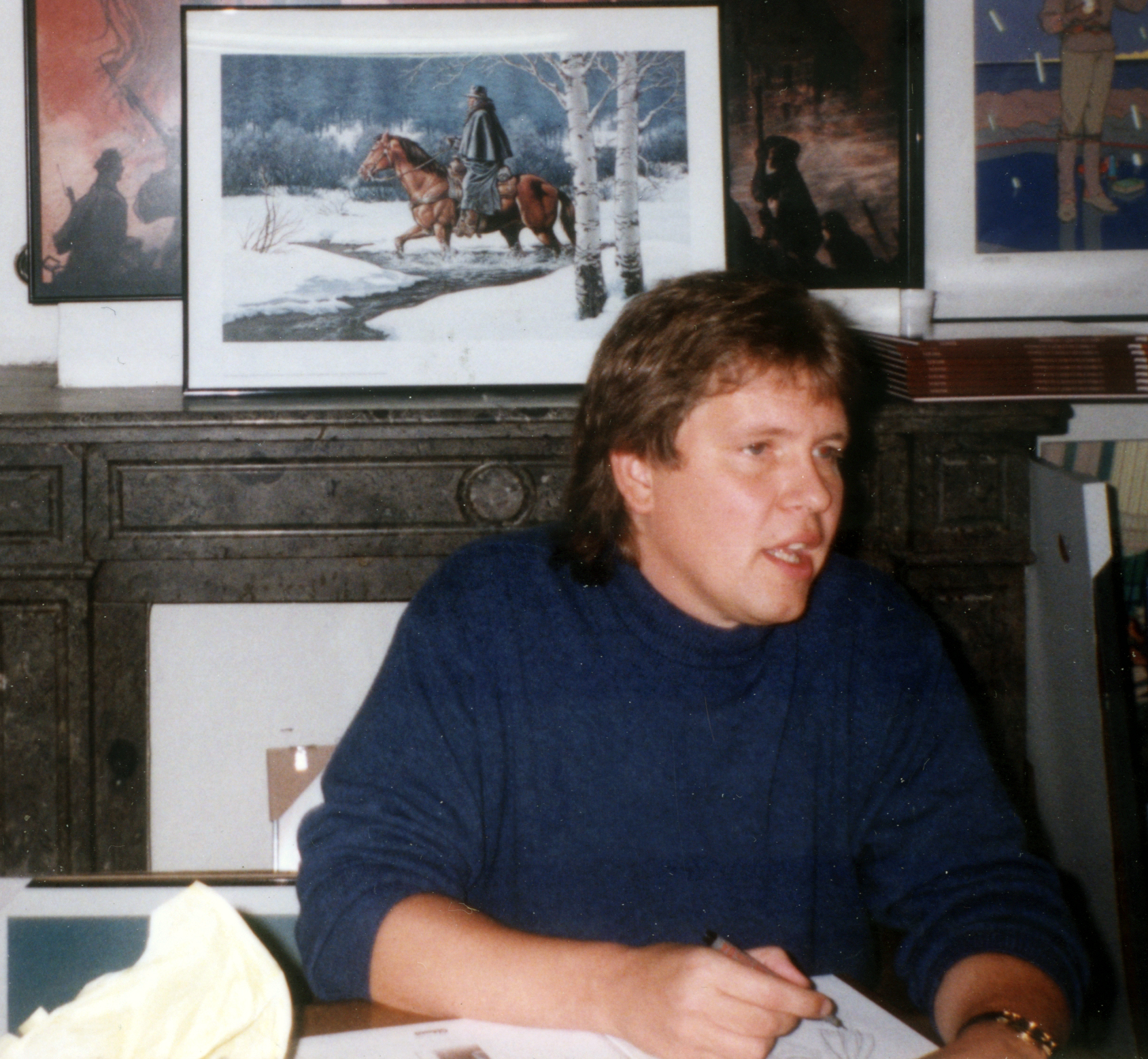
Portrait Yves Swolfs December, 1994

Yves Swolfs (born 25 April 1955) is a Belgian comic book writer and artist.

He is most known for his western series Durango, which started in 1980. Among his other works are the vampire series Le prince de la Nuit (1994–2001); the dystopian science fiction series Vlad (2000–2006, illustrated by Griffo); and the fantasy series Légende (since 2003). His comics were published by Edition des Archers, Glénat, Soleil Productions and Le Lombard, amongst others.
