= Emmanuel Lepage =

French comics artist (born 1966)

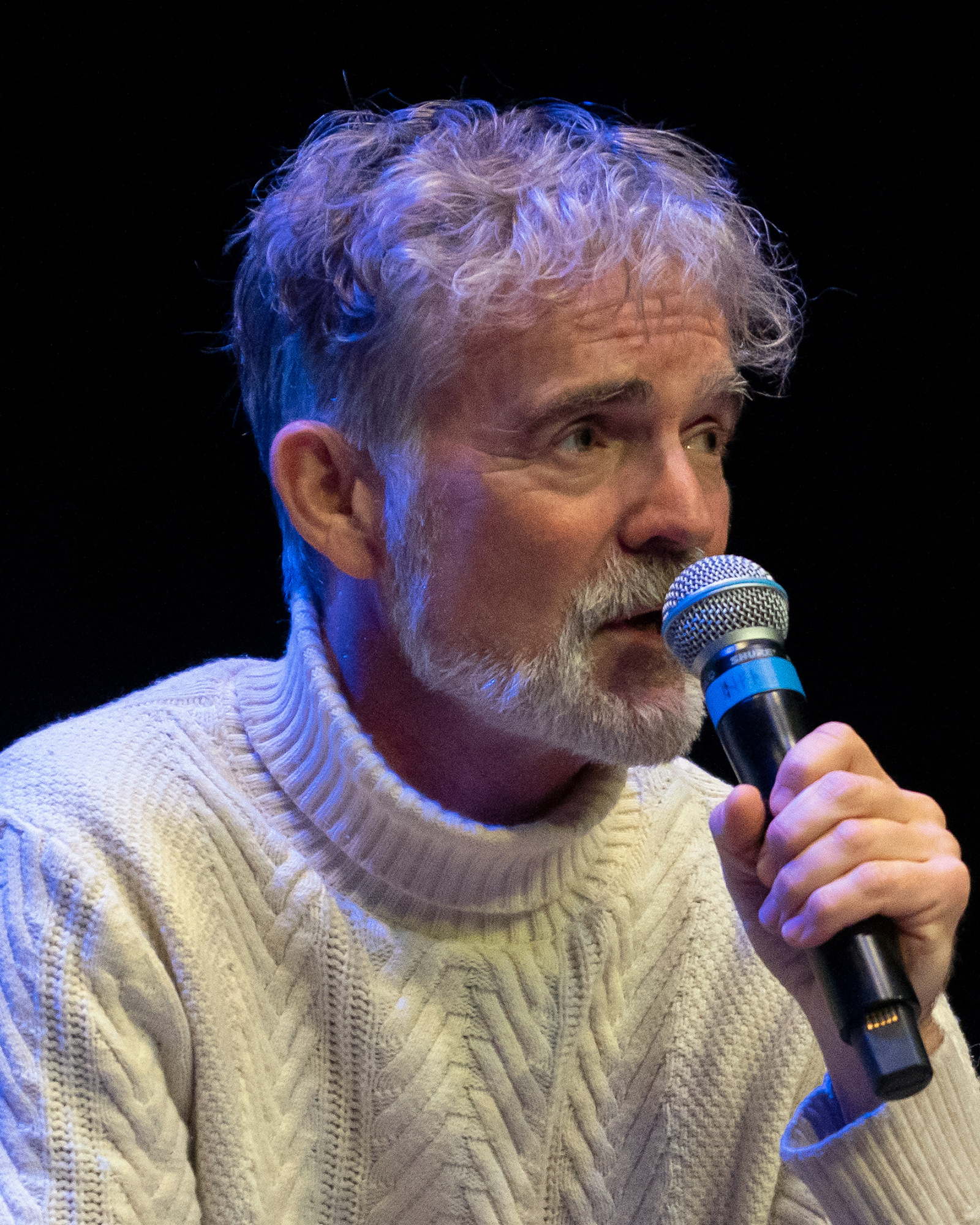
- Born: September 29, 1966
- Occupation: Comics artist, drawer, artist, illustrator
- Awards: (1999); (2005); Éléphant d'or du meilleur dessin (2007); (2012); France Info Prize (2015); Prix Grand Boum (2018); (2022)

Signature
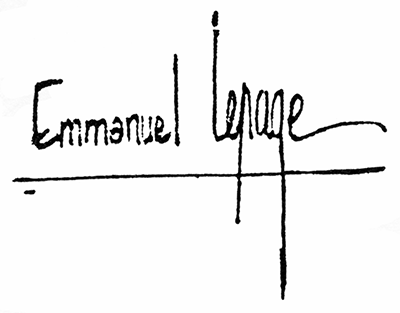

Emmanuel Lepage (born September 29, 1966) is a French comics artist. He has won numerous awards in his native country and his albums have been published throughout Europe and also in the United States, Nicaragua, Japan, South Korea and China.

== Early years ==
Lepage was born in Saint-Brieuc, Côtes-d'Armor. His artistic vocation came at the age of six, when he read Hergé's Tintin in the Land of the Soviets and decided that as an adult he would dedicate himself to comics.

At the age of thirteen, Lepage met Jean-Claude Fournier, who at the time was publishing the Spirou and Fantasio comic book series, and was taught by him. He was also taught by cartoonists Pierre Joubert and Christian Rossi. At the age of 16, he published his first drawings in the newspaper Ouest-France and in different Breton magazines.

== Career ==
At university, Emmanuel Lepage was trained as an architect, and between 1987 and 1988 he produced the Kelvinn series (Éditions Ouest-France). With a script by Georges Pernin, he drew the duology L'envoyé (Lombard).

In 1991, together with scriptwriter Dieter, he published the first volume of the Névé series (Glénat) and in 1999, with a script by writer Anne Sibran, he published La terre sans mal (Aire Libre Collection, Dupuis).

A year later, in 2000, he published Alex Clément est mort (Vents d'Ouest), with scenario by Delphine Rieu. In 2000, he went on a long journey. His travel notebooks with notes and sketches were published by Casterman under the titles Brésil and America. In 2005, he illustrated Sophie Michel's texts for Les Voyages d'Anna (Maghen), and the two volumes of Muchacho (a story set during the Sandinista Revolution in Nicaragua, about a homosexual seminarian who ends up joining the guerrillas) were published in 2004 and 2006 by Dupuis (Aire libre collection). The comic was awarded several awards such as the 16th Japan Media Arts Festival Awards in 2013.

In 2008 and 2009 he collaborated again with Sophie Michel on the two volumes of Oh, les filles (Futuropolis) and published a new travelogue (with Gildas Chasseboeuf) in 2008, where they tell the story of a trip to Chernobyl, Springtime in Chernobyl (Les fleurs de Tchernobyl; Association les Dessin'acteurs). A new, enlarged version of this book was published in 2012 by La Boîte à bulles.

In 2011, he turned his career around with the publication of Voyage aux îles de la Désolation, a "reportage in the form of a comic strip" (BD reportage, according to the author) about his voyage aboard the oceanographic ship Marion Dufresne through the French southern possessions, such as the Kerguelen Islands and the Crozet Archipelago).

With his brother, the photographer François Lepage, he published in 2014 La lune est blanche, a chronicle of his voyage to Antarctica. The magazine Télérama considered this album as one of the ten best published in 2014. This work was a finalist in 2015 for the Grand Prix de la Critique of the ACBD (Association of comic book critics and journalists) and won the 2015 France Info Prize.

Emmanuel Lepage has collaborated with numerous magazines, such as La Revue Dessinée or Long Cours. His work has also been published in numerous collective books and he has participated in exhibitions.

On September 30, 2021, Emmanuel Lepage was the first comics artist appointed official painter of the Navy (Peintre de la Marine) by the Minister of the Armed Forces.
