= Long John Silver (comics) =

French comics series

- The first book in the series, Lady Vivian Hastings.

Publication information
- Publisher: Dargaud (French); Cinebook (English)
- Format: Ongoing series
- Genre: Graphic novel for Adults
- No. of issues: 4

Creative team
- Written by: Xavier Dorison, Mathieu Lauffray
- Artist(s): Mathieu Lauffray

Long John Silver is a French comics series written by Xavier Dorison, illustrated by Mathieu Laufray and published by Dargaud in French and Cinebook in English.

== Story ==
After three years without any notice from her frightful husband Lord Byron Hastings, Lady Vivian Hastings learns from her brother-in-law Edward Hastings she has to abandon her frivolous lifestyle and enter a cloister as all her family's goods, properties and titles are sold to raise money for an expedition to the Amazon River. Indeed, it appears as if Lord Hastings has finally found the legendary city of Guyanacapac and its immense riches somewhere in South America with the help of the local indigenous Moxtechica (Mox). Desperate and pregnant from her lover, Vivian decides to join the expedition and visits Dr. Livesey in search for help. Reluctantly, Dr. Livesey introduces her to the former pirate and cook Long John Silver whose help Vivian needs if she wants to take command of the expedition, thus preparing a mutiny. Interested, Long John Silver agrees and manages to plant several of his men among the crew of Captain Edward Hastings' ship Neptune before joining the crew himself, together with Dr. Livesey. After several weeks of hard work under Captain Hastings, the pirates led a successful mutiny, which places Silver into the captain's position. However, as the map to Guyanapac was lost together with Captain Hastings in the mutiny, the crew has to rely on Mox's guidance across the meanders of the Amazonas river and its numerous effluents. Not even yet arrived in Guyanacapac, the adventure takes a turn for the worse when the Neptune suddenly disappears shortly after finding what is left of the Nimrod, Lord Byron Hastings' ship, amid increasingly mysterious circumstances.

== Volumes ==
1. Lady Vivian Hastings - 05/2007 ISBN 978-2-205-05683-9
2. Neptune - 10/2008 ISBN 978-2-205-06024-9
3. The Emerald Maze - 05/2010 ISBN 978-2-205-06348-6
4. Guiana Capac - 26/04/2013 ISBN 978-2205067514

== Translations ==
Cinebook Ltd has published Long John Silver in English:

1. Lady Vivian Hastings - November 2010 ISBN 978-1-84918-062-7
2. Neptune - March 2011 ISBN 978-1-84918-072-6
3. The Emerald Maze - October 2011 ISBN 978-1-84918-105-1
4. Guiana-Capac - November 2013 ISBN 978-1-84918-175-4

As it happens with other Cinebook publications, the books are published in censored form using graphically altered panels to cover or disguise nudity.

== Covers ==
Lady Vivian Hastings (2010)

Neptune (2011)
