= Belgian comics =

Distinct subgroup in the comics history

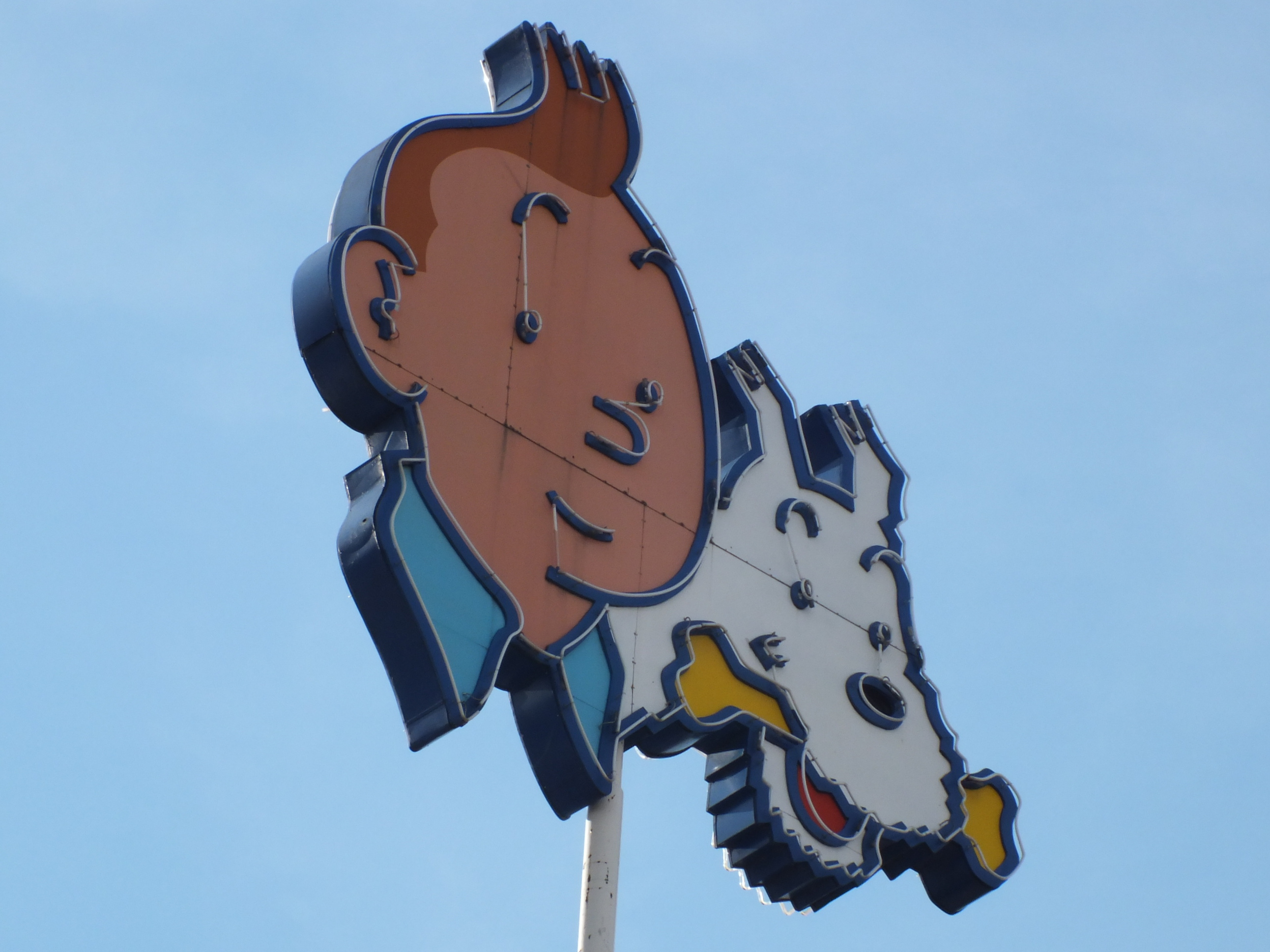
- Tintin and Snowy (Hergé), on the roof of the former headquarters of Le Lombard near Brussels-South railway station
- Earliest publications: Late 1920s
- Publishers: Casterman; Dupuis; Le Lombard
- Creators: André Franquin; Hergé; Morris; Jef Nys; Peyo; Willy Vandersteen
- Series and characters: The Adventures of Tintin; Spike and Suzy; Spirou et Fantasio; The Adventures of Nero; The Smurfs; Jommeke; Gaston Lagaffe; Blake and Mortimer; Kid Paddle; Largo Winch; Lucky Luke; Thorgal
- Languages: Dutch; French; German (rarely)

Related articles

Belgian comics have played a major role in the development of European comics, alongside French comics with which they share a long common history. While the comics in the two major language groups and regions of Belgium (Flanders with Dutch and Wallonia with French) each have distinct characteristics, they are constantly influencing one another, and meeting each other in Brussels and in the bilingual publication tradition of the major editors. As one of the few arts where Belgium has had an international and enduring impact in the 20th century, comics are known to be "an integral part of Belgian culture".

== History ==
=== Before 1940 ===
The first large-scale production of comics in Belgium started in the second half of the 1920s. Earlier, illustrated youth pages were still very similar to the Images d'Épinal and the Flemish equivalent, the Mannekensbladen. The comics that were available came from France and were mostly available in parts of Belgium where the French language dominated (Wallonia and Brussels). The most popular were La Semaine de Suzette, L'Épatant and Le bon point illustré. French authors like Marijac contributed to Belgian magazines as well.

The 1920s saw the formation of many new youth magazines, some independent like the bilingual Petits Belges/Zonneland from Catholic publishers Altiora Averbode or scout magazines like Le Boy-Scout Belge, where Hergé (Georges Remi) debuted; others were published as newspaper supplements. The most famous of these was Le Petit Vingtième, the weekly youth supplement to the Catholic newspaper Le Vingtième Siècle. Founded in 1928, it employed the young artist Georges Remi as editor-in-chief and main contributor. Remi, better known as Hergé, launched in January 1929 a new series for the supplement: The Adventures of Tintin. Initially heavily influenced by the work of French comics authors Alain Saint-Ogan and Pinchon and the American George McManus, Hergé soon developed his own style. Tintin soon became very popular, and sales of the newspaper quadrupled on Thursdays, when the supplement was included. It would become the prototype for many Belgian comics to come, in style (the so-called ligne claire), appearance rhythm (weekly), use of speech balloons (whereas comics from other countries, like the Netherlands and Denmark, would keep the text beneath the drawings for decades to come), and the method of using a first appearance in a magazine or newspaper and subsequent albums.

While Tintin was very popular, it would take almost a decade before the next successful comics magazine would appear. In the meantime, an increasing number of youth magazines would publish some pages with comics influenced by Tintin.

George Van Raemdonck, the first major Flemish comics artist, worked almost exclusively in the Netherlands until after World War II. Still, he influenced some of the earliest pre-war Flemish artists like Jan Waterschoot and Buth, and as a newspaper artist with a daily comic strip, he paved the way for the typical publishing method of the Flemish comics when compared to the prevalent Walloon magazine publications.

More situated in the classic arts than in the mainstream comics publishing was Frans Masereel, a Flemish wood engraver whose 1926 "Passionate Journey", a wordless story told in 165 woodcuts, is sometimes considered as the first graphic novel.

In the second half of the 1930s, most Walloon youth magazines made room for one or more comics by local artists. Examples are Jijé in Le Croisé in 1936 and in Petits Belges in 1939, François Gianolla in Jeunesse Ouvrière, and Sirius in Le Patriote Illustré. Dupuis, a publisher based in Marcinelle near Charleroi, was already having success with its two family magazines Le Moustique and Bonnes Soirées. Charles Dupuis, son of the CEO, decided to start a youth magazine centred around a new hero, Spirou. It debuted on 21 April 1938. French artist Robert Velter, a former assistant of Martin Branner, was asked to create the title series, and the rest of the magazine was filled with popular American comics such as Superman. 8 months later, in an unusual move, the magazine was published in Dutch under the name Robbedoes. This would have a profound influence on the development of the Flemish comics and assured that Belgian comics would have a large part of their development in common. In 1939, Jijé joined the magazine. He worked there until his death in 1980, and was the driving force of the magazine during and directly after the war. He was responsible for its expansion and success in the next decades, and was as the inspirator for the later generation of comics artists in the 1940s and 1950s which is known as the Marcinelle school. Apart from Hergé, Jijé's main inspiration came from American artists such as Milton Caniff and Noel Sickles.

Some Flemish magazines started producing more modern local comics as well, with works by established artists like Frans Van Immerseel in Zonneland and the expressionist painter Frits Van den Berghe in Bravo, or new names like Jan Waterschoot in Zonneland or Eugeen Hermans (aka Pink) in Ons Volkske, a weekly newspaper supplement inspired by Le Petit Vingtième. The most important comics writer for Bravo and Zonneland was John Flanders, who would continue to provide stories for the Flemish magazines until the 1960s.

=== World War II ===
During the war, many magazines had to stop publication or scale back their activities due to paper shortage and the limitations imposed by the German occupiers. Le Petit Vingtième was dissolved after the German invasion, and Hergé started working for the collaborating newspaper Le Soir, where he had to change from a weekly double page of Tintin to a daily strip. Paper shortage also forced him to reduce the number of pages per album from the previous 120 to 62. To compensate for this, the editor Casterman decided to start publishing the albums in colour instead of black and white. This became the post-war standard for all albums by the Walloon and Brussels publishers: From the 1960s on, almost all Flemish comics have been printed in colour.

Other magazines tried to continue publication, but had to replace the forbidden American comics with local material. This was an opportunity for new talent to emerge. In Spirou, Jijé was joined by Sirius and the young illustrator Maurice Tillieux.

The Flemish magazine Bravo, started in 1936 with almost exclusively American comics, had to change course in 1940, and created a French-language version as well, attracting a number of young Belgian artists like Edgar P. Jacobs, Jacques Laudy, Raymond Reding and the Flemish Willy Vandersteen, together with the already well-known illustrator Jean Dratz.

Another way out for young artists were a number of small animation studios, created when the popular American animated movies of the 1930s might no longer be shown. In Antwerp, Ray Goossens and Bob de Moor started with AFIM, and in Brussels, André Franquin, Eddy Paape, Peyo and Morris worked for CBA.

=== 1944–1958 ===
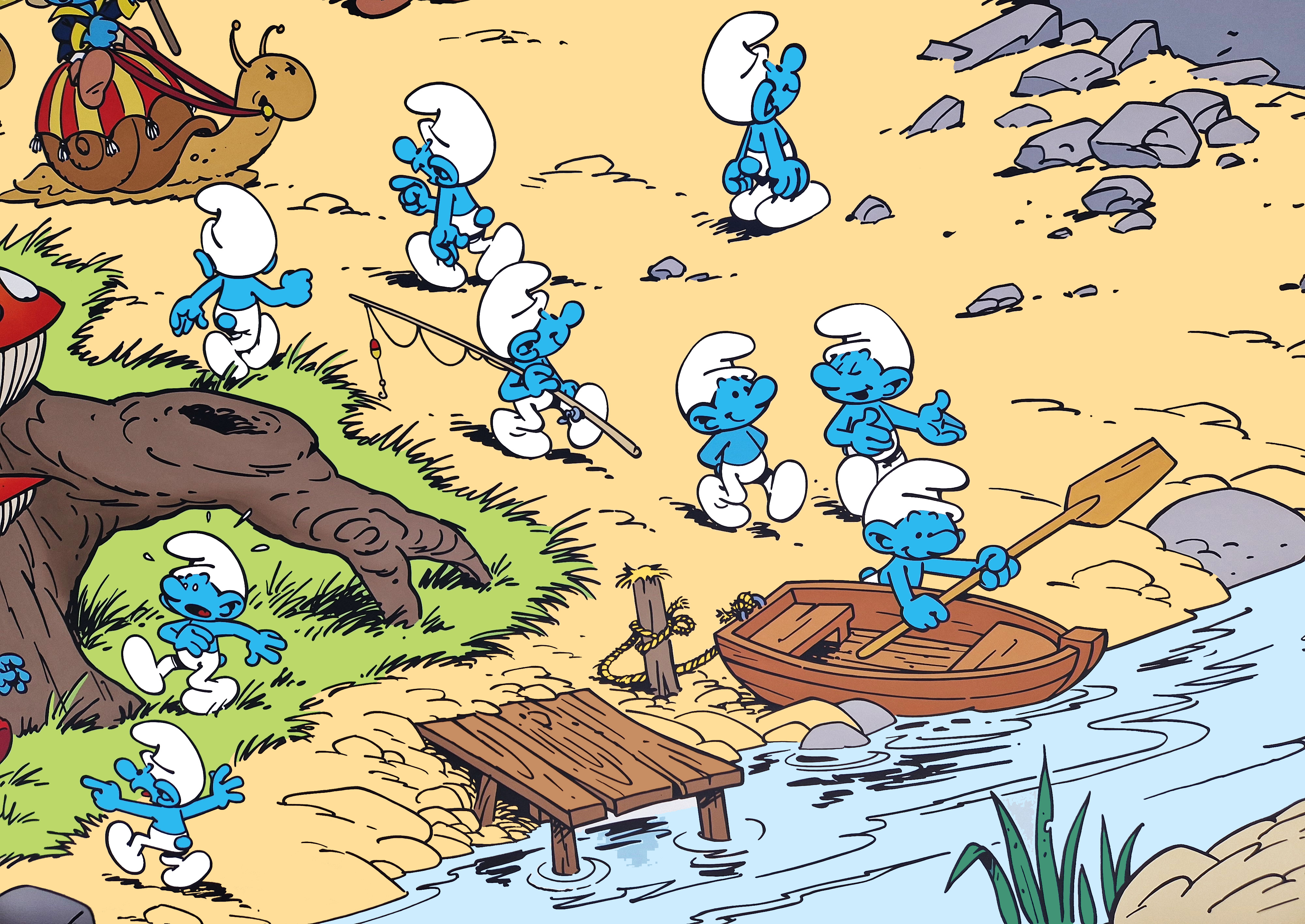
The Smurfs (Peyo), originating in Spirou magazine, became international bestsellers.

The end of World War II was a second caesure, with again many magazines disappearing or changing hands, while a huge amount of new magazines appeared now that censure and paper shortage were coming to an end. Spirou, which had disappeared at the end of 1943, reappeared in 1944 with the same authors. Bravo on the other hand got new owners, and the main contributors searched new publishers. The newspaper Le Soir replaced its wartime version and all the staff with the pre-wartime owners and staff, and Hergé was left without a publication outlet for nearly two years while allegations of collaboration with the Germans were investigated.

In 1946, Raymond Leblanc wanted to start a youth magazine to expand his small publishing house Lombard, and decided to use the already very popular Tintin as the main hero for Tintin magazine. It started in 1946 with a French and Dutch language version (the latter called Kuifje), as had become the custom for Belgian comics magazines. A version for France followed in 1948. The magazine immediately employed mainly Belgian artists, most coming from Bravo: Jacobs (who already had collaborated with Hergé), Laudy, and the young debutant Paul Cuvelier. It was an instant success, and soon other names joined, including Jacques Martin. To get the same success with the Flemish version (where Tintin was not so well known yet), two of the best new Flemish artists were contacted: Bob de Moor and Willy Vandersteen. De Moor stayed with Hergé and Tintin until the end of his life, but Vandersteen left the magazine again after 11 years.

Many other magazines only survived for a few years, and their best artists then joined either Spirou or Tintin. Magazines like Bimbo, Story or Wrill mainly had regional success and lacked a truly popular main series. Tillieux worked for Bimbo, Martin for Wrill, André-Paul Duchâteau started his writing career in the new version of Bravo. Petits Belges/Zonneland continued to be published, but only devoted a few pages to comics. The main artist in these days is Renaat Demoen, later joined by François Craenhals.

The main competitor for Tintin and Spirou in this period was Heroic-Albums, which had a different publishing method: instead of a number of continuing stories which often appeared continuously with a rhythm of one page a week, Heroic published one complete long story every week. The main artists were Tillieux, Fred Funcken, Tibet, François Craenhals, Greg, ... Due to being censored in France, the magazine finally disappeared in 1956.

In Flanders, there was a similar boom of new magazines, but the most important artists and comics in the long run worked mainly for the newspapers: Marc Sleen filled many pages in the magazine 't Kapoentje, but his main series Nero appeared in the newspaper Het Volk from 1947 on. Willy Vandersteen worked for a whole series of magazines, both in Dutch and French, but his main series Spike and Suzy appeared in De Standaard from 1945 on.

These two artists dominated the Flemish comics scene until 1980, but even though Nero gets translated in French and German, the only success outside Flanders was Spike and Suzy, which became the most popular comic of the Netherlands and got a sizable audience in Wallonia as well, mainly because of the appearance of seven specially created stories in Tintin, which are commonly considered to be the best of the series. Due to this success, Vandersteen opened a Studio which produced hundreds of comics and gave many young local artists a steady job. However, contrary to the School of Marcinelle and to a lesser degree the Studios Hergé, very few artists had a successful independent career after leaving the studio. One of the major series of the Studio was Bessy, originally made for the Walloon newspaper La Libre Belgique in 1952, and which would only later find its way to Flanders and finally to a series of more than 1000 comic books in Germany.

Meanwhile, many artists who would later become famous debuted on a small scale in the Walloon newspapers: Peyo, Greg, Albert Uderzo, René Goscinny, etc.

In the 1950s, the comics scene in Belgium is dominated by three main publishing methods: the main magazines Tintin and Spirou, coupled with the albums published afterwards by the editors Lombard and Dupuis; the daily newspaper comics in Flanders, with the cheaper black and white albums afterwards by De Standaard and Het Volk: and the weekly newspaper supplements of the French language newspapers, which mainly lacked subsequent albums. The number of other magazines slowly decreased, and the independent comic albums publishers without a magazine disappeared with the exception of Casterman, publisher of the comics by Hergé and a limited number of other comics.

In this period, the Belgian comics had their Golden Age, a period of constant growth and expansion, with the start and continuation of many of the most popular Belgian series.

Spirou expanded from 12 pages of newspaper quality to 52 full colour pages, and the number of American comics, reintroduced after the end of the war, dwindled to near nil in 1950. Their place was taken by Victor Hubinon and Jean-Michel Charlier (Buck Danny), Maurice Tillieux (Gil Jourdan), Eddy Paape, Will, and most importantly André Franquin, Morris, and Peyo. Their respective series Gaston Lagaffe, Lucky Luke and The Smurfs became international bestsellers.

While the first generation learned much of the art while working with Jijé, many younger artists started their professional career in the Studio Peyo before creating their own series, assuring the continuation of the School of Marcinelle. The humour aspect of the magazine was assured by the editor-in-chief Yvan Delporte, writer for Franquin, Will and Peyo. Together with the main artists of Tintin, they defined the Franco-Belgian comics for decades to come.

Tintin had a similar story, with rapid success and expansion. New artists like Jean Graton (Michel Vaillant) and Raymond Macherot reached new audiences. Hergé started his Studio to help him with the work on the Tintin comics, and it defined the style of many artists like Bob de Moor and Roger Leloup.

The styles of the two magazines were distinctly different, with the ligne claire and the more serious, didactic tone of Tintin contrasting with the humorous, more caricatural Marcinelle school of Spirou.

In Flanders, no local magazine could equal the success of the two translated Walloon magazines, and to survive this period, they disappeared as independent magazines and became weekly newspaper supplements. The most important was 't Kapoentje, which published the work of Buth and Rik Clément, but which had no influence outside Flanders. The only new artist to become truly successful in this period was Jef Nys with Jommeke, which debuted in 1955 and became the third major daily newspaper comic in Flanders.

Artists like Pom, Bob Mau or Renaat Demoen were less successful and had only a limited audience, while other Flemish artists started working for the French language magazines, following in the footsteps of Morris in Spirou and Bob de Moor in Tintin. The most successful of those in this period was Berck, who first appeared in this period in Tintin before moving to Spirou.

=== 1959–1977 ===
Boule et Bill (Roba) was the biggest new Spirou series in the 1960s.

From 1959 on, the dominance of Spirou and Tintin slowly disappeared. The first generation of artists could not continue the publication rhythm of the previous decades, and French magazines reached new audiences, helped by the protectionistic censoring by the French authorities. French artists like René Goscinny and Albert Uderzo, who previously worked for Belgian magazines and newspapers, started their own magazine Pilote, and the less restrictive atmosphere there attracted some of their main colleagues from Spirou like Morris, Jijé, Charlier and Hubinon. Apart from Morris, they all continued working for Spirou as well, but the decline had started.

Tintin suffered from the lack of new stories by Hergé. Greg became the new editor-in-chief in 1962 and stayed on until 1975, introducing a new, more adult style and content to the magazine, and introducing some major new artists like Hermann Huppen, William Vance, Jean Van Hamme and Dany. However, despite the critical acclaim of these authors, the circulation slowly declined from the record high of 270,000 copies a week in France alone, and the different international editions of Tintin disappeared over the next decade, but not before launching a last major series with Thorgal by Rosinski.

Spirou as well had to introduce new artists and series to fill the pages and keep their readers. It took many of them until around 1970 to become real stars, with the rise of Raoul Cauvin as the new main writer of the magazine. The biggest new series of the 1960s was Boule et Bill by Franquin-collaborator Jean Roba. It became the most popular series of the magazine together with Gaston Lagaffe after the disappearance of Lucky Luke in 1967. Around 1970, Berck (Sammy), Lambil (Les Tuniques Bleues), François Walthéry (Natacha), and Leloup (Yoko Tsuno) were the main new artists and series, with Raoul Cauvin as the most important writer. However, the top circulation of about 280,000 copies a week (France and Belgium combined), was no longer reached after 1966.

In Flanders, the situation was very stable, with the limited local publication possibilities all taken by the established authors of the 1940s and 1950s, leaving no room for new talents after the disappearance of most magazines. New artists either started working in the large Studio Vandersteen or tried to get into Spirou and Tintin, thereby strengthening the bond between the comics scenes of both language groups.

Comics fandom, started in the Netherlands and France in the 1960s, emerged in Flanders in 1966 with the different publications by Jan Smet, who also created the first Flemish comics award in 1972. This developed into the Bronzen Adhemar, the most important comics award of Flanders, named after the child prodigy character Adhemar in The Adventures of Nero. In Wallonia, it only seriously commenced in 1971, with the first awards (the Prix Saint-Michel in Brussels) and fanzine (Ran Tan Plan), both by André Leborgne (1928–2012), and the first specialized shop and republisher of old material, Michel Deligne. The Institut Saint-Luc in Brussels created a comics department with teachers like Eddy Paape, and was largely responsible for the new, more adult-oriented authors who came to the fore in the 1980s and 1990s. Expositions with the major artists were organized throughout the country, some by amateur enthusiasts, some endorsed by the government.

=== 1978–present ===
The last decades have shown the further decline of the traditional publication systems of the Belgian comics, and the end of the dominance of the Belgian authors in European comics.

Reflecting the shift from the dominance of weekly youth comics to longer adult comics was the demise of Tintin and the start of A Suivre in 1978, the more adult oriented monthly magazine of publisher Casterman. It published longer "chapters" of the main European authors of graphic novels, with artists like Hugo Pratt and Jacques Tardi. Among them, room was still reserved for the best Walloon and Brussels' talents, including Didier Comès, Benoît Sokal, and François Schuiten. The magazine, seen as the more intellectual reply to French magazines like Métal Hurlant who were more oriented towards graphical innovation, was a big success and had a lot of influence, but turned out to be relatively short-lived. The Dutch language edition, started in 1980, folded in 1989 (the same year Pilote ceased publication), and in 1997 the French language edition disappeared as well, further demonstrating the demise of the magazine format in a market where most people prefer to immediately buy the albums.

In Flanders, a final experiment with a youth comics magazine was started in 1993 with Suske en Wiske Weekblad by Standaard Uitgeverij: with a mix of classic comics and new series and carried by the most popular Dutch language series and a sizable promotional campaign, it got a sizable audience at first, but slowly lost momentum and disappeared in 2003.

The only comics magazine to survive is Spirou, but with the end of the Dutch version Robbedoes in 2005, when the circulation had dropped to only about 3,000 copies, no mass-market comics magazines for the Flemish audience remained, making it harder for young Flemish artists to gain a larger audience.

Spirou, meanwhile, after a decline during the 1970s and 1980s from 280,000 to 160,000 copies, holds on to a quite steady circulation, and is a mix of a showcase for Dupuis and a method to test new artists and series before doing the sizable investment of an album series. After experiments to target a more mature audience in the late 1970s and in the 1980s with the supplement Le Trombone Illustré and the publication of comics like XIII and Jeremiah, the focus is again fixed on humour series and an audience of young teenagers. Famous artists like Bernard Hislaire, Zep, Tome, Janry or Midam debuted or still publish in the magazine.

Both Lombard and Dupuis have since been bought by the French media concern Média Participations, but retain a large degree of independence. Next to the magazine, Dupuis, like all the other editors, targets the older audience as well with a collection of graphic novels.

In Flanders, this period started with the appearance of two new newspaper comics, Bakelandt by Hec Leemans and Kiekeboe by Merho, which were top sellers with 80,000 to 100,000 copies sold by publication. After this, comics in Flanders centered around albums, and most series and authors, like Urbanus or F. C. De Kampioenen, were only known locally. A few Flemish authors like Ever Meulen, who is mainly an illustrator, or Kamagurka, who is more of a cartoonist, were published across Wallonia, France and the Netherlands, but apart from those, the main approach for Flemish comics artists is being published by the three French language publishers.

Some of the most successful of these since the 1960s are William Vance, Jo-El Azara, Griffo, Marvano, Jean-Pol, Jan Bosschaert and Luc Cromheecke.

== Importance ==
=== Sales ===
While until 1930 almost all comics published in Belgium were either French or American, due to the success of Tintin, in 1950, almost no foreign comics were published in Belgium anymore, and by 1960, many or even most comics read in other Western European countries (excluding the United Kingdom) were made by Belgians or for Belgian magazines. By 1944, 275,000 albums of Tintin had been sold: by 2000, the worldwide sales had multiplied to nearly 200 million.

In 2000, almost 40 million albums were printed in Belgium each year: 75% of those were exported. An estimated 75% of the comics sold in France were made by the three large Belgian comics publishers, Dupuis, Le Lombard and Casterman. Dupuis alone, with a production of 9 to 10 million albums a year and a back catalogue of 1,000 titles, is responsible for one third of the French comics market. The Flemish market is largely monopolized by the giant Standaard Uitgeverij, whose Spike and Suzy are produced with 300,000 to 400,000 copies for each new title, half of which are exported to the Netherlands, and who also publishes Nero, Kiekeboe and Urbanus. Het Volk, who largely existed due to one title, Jommeke, with a total sales of 50 million copies in 50 years, has sold its comics to Dupuis. Even though most of these editors are now in foreign (mainly French) hands, they still operate from Belgium and are led by Belgian people. Belgium has more than 700 professional comics creators, making it the country with the most comics artists per km².

In 2010, four of the ten bestselling comics authors in France were Belgians: Jean Van Hamme, Hergé, Raoul Cauvin, and Stephen Desberg. Similarly, six of the ten bestselling comics titles were partly or completely of Belgian origin, with Largo Winch, Lucky Luke, Blake and Mortimer, Le Chat, Le Petit Spirou, and Thorgal. In Flanders, comics make up about 14% of the total number of sales of books, with 5 comics (3 from De Kiekeboes and 2 from FC De Kampioenen) in the top 20 of bestselling books of 2010. Only one translated comic made it into the top 20 of bestselling comics in Flanders, Largo Winch, indicating that while Francophone comics are still widely translated in Dutch, the major sellers are local Flemish products.

=== Influence and recognition ===
Belgium has played a major role in the development of comics as the "9th art". The Belgian cartoonist Morris introduced the term in 1964 when he started a series about the history of comics in Spirou. Belgium's comic-strip culture was called "Europe's richest" by Time magazine, and the Calgary Sun calls Belgium "the home of the comic strip".

Recognition for the Belgian comics outside the fandom was slow to come, but in the 1970s more and more comics and authors got reviews and articles in newspapers and magazines. The first official stamp picturing a comics hero was made in 1979, showing Tintin, and most famous Belgian comics followed in the next decades. Major expositions were organized from 1969 on, and finally the Belgian Comic Strip Center, commonly called the Comic Art Museum, was opened in Brussels in 1989 in an old fabric store designed by Victor Horta. It grew rapidly, with 160,000 visitors in 1994 and 240,000 by 2000. Different Belgian towns have mural paintings and statues of the major comics, and some of the most famous artists have been knighted. In 2024, the art of comics was included in the inventory of intangible cultural heritage of the Brussels-Capital Region.

Belgian comics, the authors and the magazines are generally regarded as being central in the development of the European comic. Hergé, with Tintin, and Jijé, as a comics teacher, are considered as the most influential of the early Belgian authors. French author Tibet said that the comics artists consider Hergé as God the Father and Jijé as the Godfather. Jijé was not only the teacher of important Belgian authors like André Franquin, but also of major French authors like Jean Giraud and Jean-Claude Mézières. In the Hergé Studio worked French authors like Jacques Martin, and Swiss author Derib worked for years in the Studio Peyo. The comic magazines Tintin and Spirou were translated in different languages, and the major comics from the magazines were reprinted in the main comics magazines in Italy, Spain, Portugal, Germany, or the Netherlands. Albums of the main series and authors have been translated in dozens of languages, and even many minor series have been translated in different languages in Western Europe. Artists like the Dutch Joost Swarte, American Chris Ware, Australian Bill Leak or Norwegian Jason are heavily influenced by the ligne claire of Hergé, while others like the Spanish Daniel Torres, Finnish Pora and French Yves Chaland more closely followed the "Atom Style" of Jijé and Franquin. More recent artists like Kamagurka and Philippe Geluck are especially popular in France. More recently, Belgian graphic novels have been translated in English as well, like Jean-Philippe Stassens Deogratias, while many older series are reprinted as well, though often with limited success.

Especially Hergé and Tintin have also had a lot of influence on other artists outside the circle of comics authors, like Roy Lichtenstein and Andy Warhol. Hergé has also been recognised by a street and a statue in Angoulême, France, and both the French and the Dutch postal offices have issued stamps remembering Tintin.

Video games and animated and live action movies have been made for series such as XIII, Tintin, Spirou et Fantasio, Spike and Suzy and Lucky Luke, and the long-running Hanna-Barbera series of The Smurfs which became a worldwide success with massive merchandising. The success of such shows continues as evidenced by the ratings that animated cartoons based on the adventures of Tintin and Lucky Luke had in Germany and Canada in 2005 and 2006. More mature graphic novels like The Wedding Party by Hermann Huppen and Jean Van Hamme have been turned into movies.

Most major European comic artists worked for a while, often early in their career, in Belgium: French authors like Albert Uderzo and René Goscinny, Jacques Tardi, Jean Graton and Claire Bretécher, a German like Andreas, the Polish author Grzegorz Rosiński, the Portuguese Carlos Roque, Swiss authors Zep and Cosey. Even the major Italian author Hugo Pratt created many of his best known later works for Casterman.

== See also ==
- Brussels' Comic Book Route
- Belgian Comic Strip Center
