= Averbode =

Averbode may refer to:

- Averbode (village), a village in Scherpenheuvel-Zichem, Belgium
- Averbode Abbey, an abbey in the village
- Averbode (beer), see Beer in Belgium
- Averbode (publisher), a publishing company owned by the abbey
