= Georges Chaulet =

French writer (1931–2012)

Georges Chaulet (25 January 1931 – 13 October 2012) was a French writer most famous for the series Fantômette, a series he created in 1961. His books were destined for young readers and Fantômette featured a female superhero for the first time in French literature. He is also the author of Les 4 As, a series created in 1957. He also released Le Petit Lion children's book series.

== Career ==
Chaulet's father was an engineer, and his mother a shopkeeper. The family settled in 1936 in Antony (Hauts-de-Seine), France. After his baccalaureate, Georges Chaulet continued studying architecture at École nationale supérieure des Beaux-Arts. From 1952 to 1954, he served in the French Army in Germany. Then he returned to Antony, where he worked in the family coffee business with his parents, at the same time starting to write as an author. He would stay in Antony most of the time.

In 1957, Georges Chaulet proposed his first series, Les 4 As, to Hachette, one of France biggest publishers. But Hachette refused to publish it, having just bought the rights to all of Enid Blyton's novels, most notably The Famous Five. Eventually Casterman, another major French publisher, published Chaulet's work. There were six books in the series, followed by 43 volumes as a comics series narrated by Chaulet and drawn by François Craenhals. The series was the basis of the Belgian illustrated novel Les 4 As au collège by Chaulet and Craenhals, first published in 1962. The novel was published by Casterman in the Relais series.

Strengthened by the success of Les 4 As, George Chaulet then proposed a new series titled Fantômette to Hachette, and this time the publishing house accepted. Forty-nine volumes of Fantômette were published from 1961 to 1987 in the Bibliothèque rose series. The Fantomette books were aimed at eight- to twelve-year-old girls. There are 52 books in the series. It also resulted in a comic book series by François Craenhals, and a 1993 live-action TV series starring Katia Sourzac and a cartoon series in 1998. In 2006, to celebrate the 150 years of the Bibliothèque rose, and after an eighteen-year absence, Georges Chaulet wrote a new adventure of his favorite heroïne titled Le Retour de Fantômette.

Chaulet also authored Le Petit Lion, a series of 13 children books inspired by the TV series of the same title. The books were published between 1968 and 1979 on Hachette in the collection series Bibliothèque rose.

Chaulet died on 13 October 2012, having written more than one hundred and fifty books for youth in the course of his career, and having sold over 15 million copies.

== Publications ==
=== Les 4 As series ===
Books

1. 1957: Le Fantôme de Campaville
2. 1958: Les 4 As font du cinéma
3. 1959: Les 4 As et Picasso
4. 1961: Les 4 As et le Serpent de mer
5. 1962: Les 4 As et le Secret du donjon
6. 1962: Les 4 As au collège

Comics

1. 1964: Les 4 As et le Serpent de mer
2. 1964: Les 4 As et l'Aéroglisseur
3. 1964: Les 4 As et la Vache sacrée
4. 1965: Les 4 As et le Visiteur de minuit
5. 1966: Les 4 As et le Couroucou
6. 1967: Les 4 As et la Coupe d'or
7. 1968: Les 4 As et le Dragon des neiges
8. 1969: Les 4 As et le Rallye olympique
9. 1970: Les 4 As et l'Île du Robinson
10. 1971: Les 4 As et le Tyran
11. 1973: Les 4 As et la Ruée vers l'or
12. 1974: Les 4 As et le Picasso volé
13. 1975: Les 4 As et la Bombe F
14. 1976: Les 4 As et la Saucisse volante
15. 1977: Les 4 As et le Gang des chapeaux blancs
16. 1978: Les 4 As et le Vaisseau fantôme
17. 1979: Les 4 As et le Diamant bleu
18. 1980: Les 4 As et la Licorne
19. 1981: Les 4 As et l'Iceberg
20. 1982: Les 4 As et le Château maléfique
21. 1983: Les 4 As et le Trésor des Tsars
22. 1984: Les 4 As et le Hold-up de la Big Bank
23. 1985: Les 4 As et le Magicien
24. 1987: Les 4 As et le Secret de la montagne
25. 1988: Les 4 As et la Déesse des mers
26. 1989: Les 4 As et la Navette spatiale
27. 1990: Les 4 As et le Requin géant
28. 1991: Les 4 As et l'Empire caché
29. 1992: Les 4 As et le Mystère de la jungle
30. 1993: Les 4 As et les Extraterrestres
31. 1994: Les 4 As et le Fantôme du mont Saint-Michel
32. 1995: Les 4 As et le Robot vandale
33. 1996: Les 4 As et l'Atlantide
34. 1997: Les 4 As et les Sorcières
35. 1998: Les 4 As et les Dinosaures
36. 1999: Les 4 As et la Momie
37. 2000: Les 4 As et les Fantômes
38. 2001: Les 4 As et le Monstre des océans
39. 2002: Les 4 As et Halloween
40. 2003: Les 4 As et le Loup de Tasmanie
41. 2004: Les 4 As et le Grand Suprême
42. 2005: Mission Mars
43. 2007: La Balade des 4 As (by Sergio Salma and Alain Maury)

=== Fantômette series ===
1. 1961 : Les Exploits de Fantômette
2. 1962 : Fantômette contre le hibou
3. 1963 : Fantômette contre le géant
4. 1963 : Fantômette au carnaval
5. 1964 : Fantômette et l'Île de la sorcière
6. 1964 : Fantômette contre Fantômette
7. 1965 : Pas de vacances pour Fantômette
8. 1966 : Fantômette et la Télévision
9. 1966 : Opération Fantômette
10. 1967 : Les Sept Fantômettes
11. 1967 : Fantômette et la Dent du Diable
12. 1968 : Fantômette et son prince
13. 1968 : Fantômette et le Brigand
14. 1969 : Fantômette et la Lampe merveilleuse
15. 1970 : Fantômette chez le roi
16. 1970 : Fantômette et le Trésor du pharaon
17. 1971 : Fantômette et la Maison hantée
18. 1971 : Fantômette à la Mer de sable
19. 1971 : Fantômette contre la Main Jaune
20. 1972 : Fantômette viendra ce soir
21. 1972 : Fantômette dans le piège
22. 1973 : Fantômette et le Secret du désert
23. 1973 : Fantômette et le Masque d'argent
24. 1973 : Fantômette chez les corsaires
25. 1974 : Fantômette contre Charlemagne
26. 1974 : Fantômette et la Grosse Bête
27. 1974 : Fantômette et le Palais sous la mer
28. 1975 : Fantômette contre Diabola
29. 1975 : Appelez Fantômette!
30. 1975 : Olé, Fantômette!
31. 1976 : Fantômette brise la glace
32. 1976 : Les Carnets de Fantômette
33. 1977 : C'est quelqu'un, Fantômette!
34. 1977 : Fantômette dans l'espace
35. 1977 : Fantômette fait tout sauter
36. 1978 : Fantastique Fantômette
37. 1978 : Fantômette et les 40 Milliards
38. 1979 : L'Almanach de Fantômette
39. 1979 : Fantômette en plein mystère
40. 1979 : Fantômette et le Mystère de la tour
41. 1980 : Fantômette et le Dragon d'or
42. 1981 : Fantômette contre Satanix
43. 1982 : Fantômette et la Couronne
44. 1982 : Mission impossible pour Fantômette
45. 1983 : Fantômette en danger
46. 1984 : Fantômette et le Château mystérieux
47. 1984 : Fantômette ouvre l'œil
48. 1985 : Fantômette s'envole
49. 1987 : C'est toi Fantômette!
50. 2006 : Le Retour de Fantômette
51. 2007 : Fantômette a la main verte
52. 2009 : Fantômette et le Magicien

Plus: Hors-Série (2011) : Les Secrets de Fantômette

=== Le Petit Lion series ===
1. 1968 : Le Petit Lion premier ministre — Illustrations by Pierre Leroy, coll. Nouvelle Bibliothèque rose No. 295
2. 1969 : Le Petit Lion et la Source enchantée — Illustrations by Pierre Leroy, Nouvelle Bibliothèque rose No 318
3. 1969 : Le Petit Lion se fâche — Illustrations by Pierre Leroy, Nouvelle Bibliothèque rose No 328
4. 1970 : Le Petit Lion astronaute — Illustrations by Pierre Leroy, Nouvelle Bibliothèque rose No 338
5. 1970 : Le Petit Lion va se marier — Illustrations by Jeanne Hives, Nouvelle Bibliothèque rose No 363
6. 1971 : Le Petit Lion dans la tempête — Illustrations by Jeanne Hives, Nouvelle Bibliothèque rose No 389
7. 1972 : Le Petit Lion tourne un grand film — Illustrations by Jean Sidobre
8. 1973 : Le Petit Lion à l’école — Illustrations by Jeanne Hives
9. 1974 : Le Petit Lion inventeur — Illustrations by Jeanne Hives
10. 1975 : Le Petit Lion cow-boy — Illustrations by Jeanne Hives
11. 1975 : Le Petit Lion grand chasseur — Illustrations by Jeanne Hives
12. 1976 : Le Petit Lion au palais des merveilles — Illustrations by Jeanne Hives
13. 1979 : Le Petit Lion et les Sept Pingouins — Illustrations by Jeanne Bazin

=== Others ===
- 1963: Les 3D à la chasse aux timbres, illustrations by Jacques Fromont, Hachette, Nouvelle bibliothèque rose
- 1964: Les 3D à l'hôtel flottant, illustrations by Jacques Fromont, Hachette, Nouvelle bibliothèque rose
- 1963: Une rapière pour Béatrice, illustrations by François Batet, Bibliothèque verte
- 1965: Béatrice au grand galop, illustrations by François Batet, Bibliothèque verte
- 1965: Béatrice à l'abordage, illustrations by François Batet, Bibliothèque verte
- 1966: Le Bathyscaphe d'or, illustrations by François Batet, Idéal-Bibliothèque
- 1979: Le Prince Charmant chez la fée Pervenche, Bibliothèque rose
- 1979: Le Trésor du prince Charmant, Bibliothèque rose
- 1980: Le Prince Charmant face au géant, Bibliothèque rose
- 1980: Le Prince Charmant contre la Sorcière Verte, Bibliothèque rose
- 1989: Le Trésor de la Trinité, Bibliothèque rose
- 1989: Le Trésor des Apaches, Bibliothèque rose
- 1989: Le Trésor des Templiers, Bibliothèque rose
- 1990: Le Trésor des alchimistes, Bibliothèque rose
