= Les 4 As au collège =

Belgian illustrated novel

Les 4 As au collège is a Belgian illustrated novel by Georges Chaulet and François Craenhals. It was first published in 1962. The novel was published by Casterman in the Relais series.

The novel stars the characters of Les 4 As, a French-language comic book series. The characters are interns in a college where mysterious thefts were committed. Lastic, having discovered an anomaly in the college's plans, found an ancient cache that solved the mystery.
