= Renaat Demoen =

Belgian comics artist and illustrator

Renaat Demoen (11 June 1914 – 22 May 1986) was a Belgian illustrator and comics creator. He is most associated with the children's magazines of De Goede Pers, among them Zonneland.

== Biography ==
Renaat Demoen worked for a number of publishers, including Lannoo, when he met Nonkel Fons, editor-in-chief of the youth publications of Averbode, in 1942. Demoen soon became one of the main illustrators for the magazines, and lived at the medieval gate house of the Averbode Abbey until his marriage in 1968, when he moved to the village of Averbode.

Demoen was a self-taught illustrator and layouter. When the magazine Zonneland reappeared after the second World War, he redesigned the magazine, provided most of the illustrations, and created a comic for the front page. He created 15 comics between 1945 and 1959, but only a few of those were published in book format at the time. His main work are the illustrations for Zonneland and Petits Belges until the early 1970s, and a few hundred covers for the Vlaamse Filmpjes. Furthermore, he illustrated more than 400 books, mainly destined for the youth. Most of these were published by Averbode as well, but also for Opdebeeck and other Flemish publishers. Two of these books were written by Demoen.

As a comics creator, his early works, from 1945 to 1950, are remarkable due to their experiments with page lay-outs and coloring, and their strong stories. Spits de Durver was one of the few Flemish comics about the war, and described the adventures of a boy whose father was deported to Germany. Following stories were mainly based around the figures of Johnny and Annie, but were less realistic and more escapist. A final masterpiece was De Zwarte Veroveraar (The Black Conqueror), with a story by John Flanders, about the life of Pierre-Jean De Smet. He was one of the main early comics authors in Flanders, together with Marc Sleen, Willy Vandersteen and Bob de Moor, but due to his shorter career and limited audience, he has become largely forgotten.

He also created the images for the Druivelaar, a daily calendar which was very popular in Flanders. As of 2007, his images are still used here.

For his own pleasure, he also painted, both landscapes and brutally coloured scenes with gnomes.

== Bibliography ==
- List of 326 books illustrated by Demoen and published by Averbode
- Comics created by Demoen which were published as albums:

Title	Year	Scenarist	Editor	Remarks
Het geheim van Stormwind	1948	Nonkel Fons	Averbode	Appeared in French as Le Mystère de Hurlevent
Het geheim rond den spookput	1949	René Adriaensens	Averbode	Appeared in French as La Marmite du dragon
De staf van den tovenaar	1950	Marie-Hélène	Averbode	Appeared in French as Le Bâton du féticheur
De kat met de gouden staart	1951	Renaat Demoen	Averbode	
Auto-stop	1953	Nonkel Fons	Averbode	
Het geheim van het Riethof	1956	Nonkel Fons	Averbode	
De zwarte veroveraar	1978	John Flanders	De Dageraad	Reprint of an old story

== Sources ==
- Béra, Michel; Denni, Michel; and Mellot, Philippe (2002): "Trésors de la Bande Dessinée 2003–2004". Paris, Les éditions de l'amateur. ISBN 2-85917-357-9
- Matla, Hans: "Stripkatalogus 9: De negende dimensie". Panda, Den Haag, 1998. ISBN 90-6438-111-9
