= Arthur Berckmans =

Belgian comics author (1929–2020)

- Born: 3 May 1929 Leuven, Belgium
- Died: 28 December 2020 (aged 91)
- Areas: Writer, Artist
- Pseudonym: Berck
- Notable works: Sammy
- Awards: full list

Arthur Berckmans (3 May 1929 – 28 December 2020), better known as Berck, was a Belgian comics author, best known for Sammy.

== Biography ==
Arthur Berckmans was born in Leuven in 1929. He studied drawing at the Art academy of Leuven and at the Institut Saint-Luc in Brussels. His first job as an illustrator was in 1948 for the Flemish Jesuit magazine Pro Apostolis. He also illustrated some youth novels, and started to work at PubliArt, a publicity division of Le Lombard, where he made many drawings and a few publicity comics, appearing in many Belgian newspapers and magazines.

In 1958, Berck was asked by Tintin magazine to collaborate with René Goscinny on a new comical series, Strapontin. The series became a moderate success, and Berck created a few other series for the magazine, the most notable being Rataplan.

In the meantime, he also started working for Zonneland, the youth magazine of Altiora Averbode, the publishing house of the abbey of Averbode. In later years, he contributed to Sjors, one of the major Dutch comics magazines, where he created the series Lowietje.

But his main breakthrough came when he worked for Spirou magazine. His first series, Mulligan, did not make much of an impact, but when he teamed up with Raoul Cauvin for Sammy, a series about an unlikely pair of bodyguards in Chicago at the time of Al Capone and Eliot Ness, he quickly became one of the more popular artists of the magazine, and the albums got impressive sales. Berck ceased his work on all other series to focus solely on Sammy.

In 1994, Berck announced that he would retire. While this is usual in Belgium at the age of 65, it was an almost unprecedented move for a comics' artist. Sammy was continued by the experienced artist Jean-Pol.

== Bibliography ==
Series	Years	Volumes	Scenarist	Editor
Strapontin	1962–1975	9	René Goscinny and Jacques Acar	Le Lombard and Dargaud
De Sjeik van de Woestijn	1964	1	Yves Duval	Parein
Rataplan	1965–1973	9	Yves Duval	Le Lombard and Dargaud
De Zwartepinken	1970	2	Maurits Renders	Altiora Averbode
Sammy	1972–1994	31	Raoul Cauvin	Dupuis
Rolf Kauka's Mischa	1972–1975	0	Studio Berck	Kauka
De Donderpadjes	1973–1981	2	Rudy Jansen	Oberon and De Dageraad
Lowietje	1976–1982	7	Raoul Cauvin	Oberon
Lombok	1978–1985	3	Daniël Janssens	Standaard Uitgeverij and Bédéscope
Mulligan	1983	1	Raymond Macherot and Yvan Delporte	Bédéscope
Het H.A.P.-mysterie	1986–1987	4	Raoul Cauvin	De Ruijter

This bibliography only lists the comics Berck made which were published as an album in French or Dutch. He further made many short stories, illustrations, and comics for magazines only (e.g. 59 short comics featuring Mischa). His work has been translated into Danish, Finnish, German and Spanish.

== Awards ==
- 1973: Prix Saint-Michel for Best Comical Artwork, Brussels, Belgium
- 1975: Prix Saint-Michel for Best Comical Comic
- 1985: Bronzen Adhemar, Turnhout, Belgium

== Sources ==
- Béra, Michel; Denni, Michel; and Mellot, Philippe: "Trésors de la Bande Dessinée 1999-2000". Les éditions de l'amateur, Paris, 1998. ISBN 2-85917-258-0
- Matla, Hans: "Stripkatalogus 9: De negende dimensie". Panda, Den Haag, 1998. ISBN 90-6438-111-9
