= Andreas Bernardus de Quertenmont =

Flemish painter, copyist, engraver and etch artist

Andreas Bernardus de Quertenmont (1 February 1750, in Antwerp – 3 June 1835, in Antwerp) was a Flemish painter, copyist, engraver and etch artist. He was also an art educator and administrator as he held positions as a professor and director of the Academy of Fine Arts in Antwerp. He was born in the Austrian Netherlands in the Holy Roman Empire.

== Life ==
De Quertenmont studied with the Antwerp engraver Philippus Keminckx while studying at the same time drawing at the Academy of Fine Arts in Antwerp.

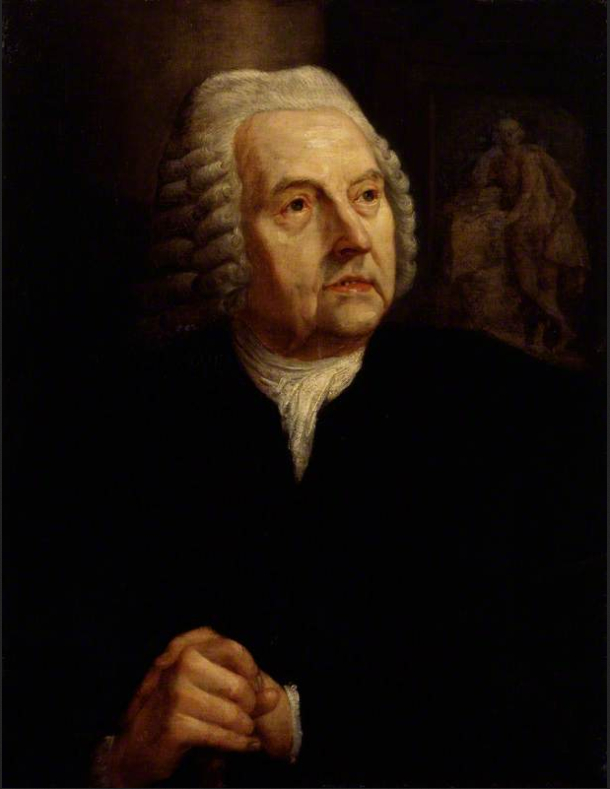
Portrait of Peter Scheemakers, 1776

He won the first prize for live model drawing at the Antwerp Academy in 1771. The same year he became master in the local Guild of Saint Luke. He subsequently became a professor at the academy. He was appointed director of the academy in 1778 and held that position until the academy was closed down by the French occupiers in October 1794. He then opened his own drawing workshop which was very successful. He received in 1790 a membership diploma of the Kunstakademie Düsseldorf.

De Quertenmont had numerous pupils, including Adriaan de Lelie and Frans Balthazar Solvyns.

== Work ==
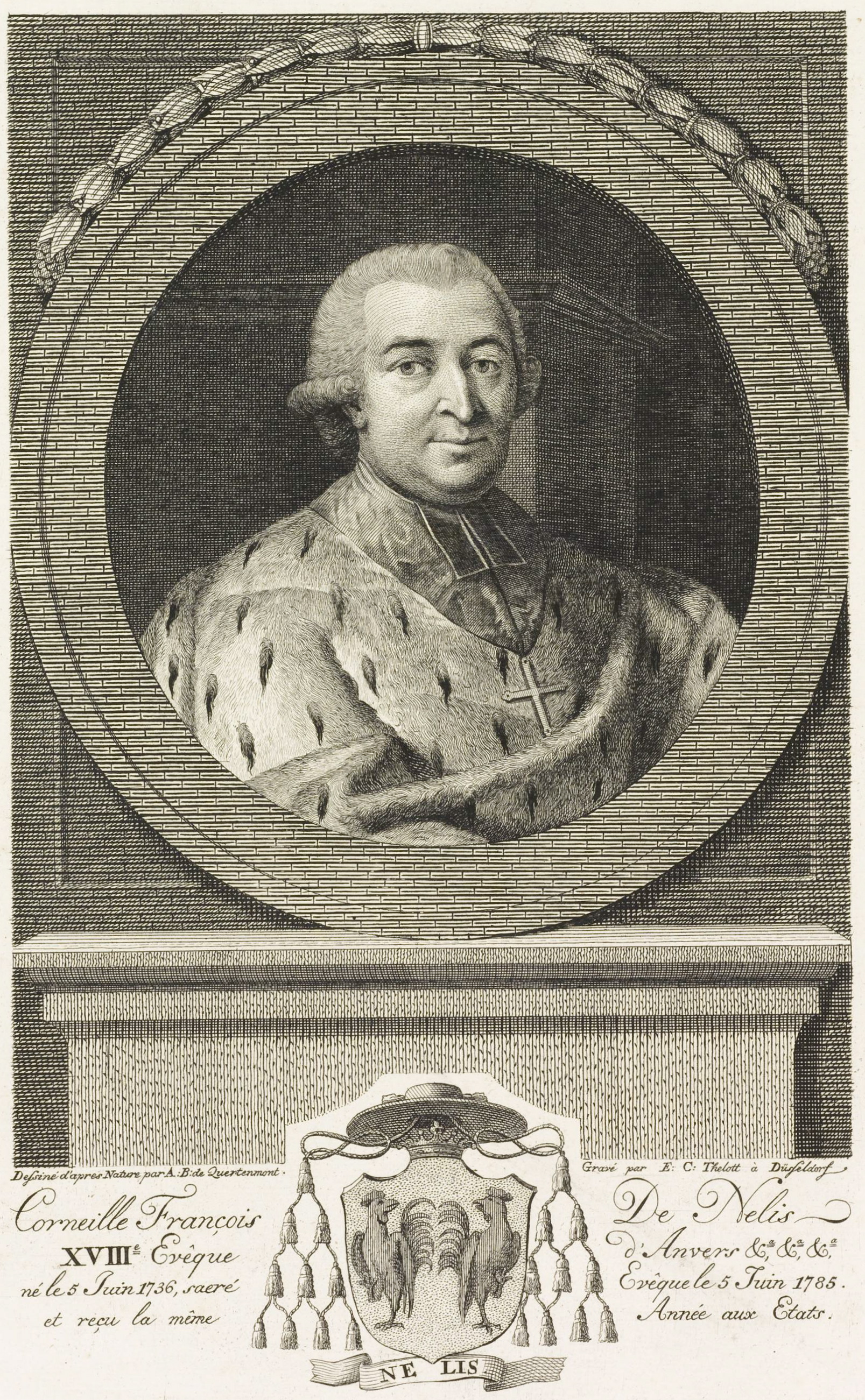
Cornelius Franciscus Nelis, engraving by Ernst Carl Gottlieb Thelott after a drawing by de Quertenmont

De Quertenmont made compositions of historical and religious scenes, and specialized in portrait painting. Very few paintings by his hand survive and he is now mainly known through his graphic work and drawings.

In 1787, de Quertenmont made a series of 55 portraits commemorating an important meeting of the States of Brabant. He had originally planned a series of 80 portraits. De Quertenmont commissioned different foreign engravers to engrave the series. Some of the preparatory drawings have been preserved and show de Quertenmont to be an excellent draughtsman who could make lively and expressive portraits.

De Quertenmont was an accomplished copyist respected for his technique. It was to him that was entrusted the task of making a copy of the Madonna of the Rosary by Caravaggio after Emperor Joseph II of Austria claimed the original by Caravaggio, which was the property of the Dominicans in Antwerp, for his art collection in 1786. He painted a portrait of Gregorius Thiels abbot of Averbode.

De Quertenmont produced a number of etchings, including portraits after paintings by Rubens and van Dyck as well as after his own drawings.
