= Gregorius Thiels =

The Reverend Lord Gregorius Thiels OPraem
- Abbas Monast. Averbodiensis
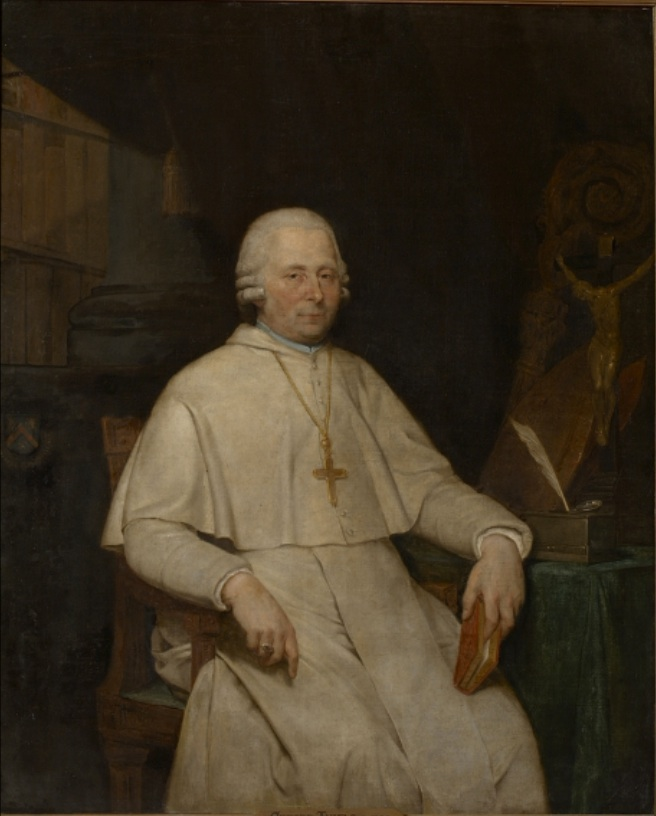
- Portrait in Averbode.
- Church: Roman Catholic
- Predecessor: Mauritius Verboven
- Successor: Norbertus Dierckx
- Other post: President College Louvain

Orders
- Ordination: 1790

Personal details
- Born: Norbert; 1742 Herselt
- Died: 1822 (aged 79–80)

Gregorius Thiels, O Praem., was the 43rd abbot of Averbode Abbey, the last before the French Revolution.

Thiels entered Averbode abbey in 1762. He studied theology at Louvain University. In 1774, after his ordination he received the name Gregorius. He was elected abbot in 1770, and by permission of the Emperor sat in the States of Brabant as a member for the First Estate. Four years later, the monks were chased out of their abbey. In 1808, the abbot returned. He died there in 1822.

His portrait painted by Andreas Bernardus de Quertenmont is kept inside Averbode Abbey.
