= Fantômette =

Children's book series by Georges Chaulet

- Cover to "Les secrets de Fantômette" (2011)
- Author: Georges Chaulet
- Original title: Fantômette
- Country: France
- Language: French
- Genre: Children's literature; adventure; mystery
- Publisher: Hachette
- Published: 1961–2011
- Media type: Print
- No. of books: 52

Fantômette is a series of 52 volumes created in 1961 by Georges Chaulet. The books were destined for young readers and feature a female superhero of the same name. It was published in the Bibliothèque rose series from Hachette Editions. Fantômette's alter ego, Françoise Dupont, is a girl of about twelve years who dresses up in order to fight crime. She has two sidekicks: Ficelle, a tall and not-very-bright blonde, and Boulotte, a short and chubby brunette who is fixated on food. Neither of them are aware of her secret identity, despite meeting Fantômette regularly and idolising her.

Fantômette was the first female superhero in French literature. The Fantômette books were aimed at eight- to twelve-year-old girls. There are 52 books in the series, which is still published today, as well as a comic book series by François Craenhals, a 1993 live-action TV series starring Katia Sourzac, and a cartoon series in 1998.

In 1957, the author, Georges Chaulet, proposed his first series, Les 4 As au collège, to Hachette, one of the biggest French publishers. But Hachette refused, having just bought the rights to all of Enid Blyton's novels, most notably The Famous Five. It was finally Casterman, a French-Belgian publisher, that published it. Very quickly, Les 4 As au collège was adapted as a comic book.

George Chaulet then proposed Fantômette to Hachette, this time accepted. Forty-nine volumes were then published from 1961 to 1987 in the Bibliothèque rose series. In 2006, to celebrate the 150 years of the Bibliothèque rose and after an eighteen-year absence, Georges Chaulet wrote a new book, Le Retour de Fantômette.

== List of titles ==
Here is the complete list of the Fantômette novels in their original order of publication:

1. 1961: Les Exploits de Fantômette
2. 1962: Fantômette contre le hibou (July 1962)
3. 1963: Fantômette contre le géant (January 1963)
4. 1963: Fantômette au carnaval (September 1963)
5. 1964: Fantômette et l'Île de la sorcière (August 1964)
6. 1964: Fantômette contre Fantômette
7. 1965: Pas de vacances pour Fantômette
8. 1966: Fantômette et la Télévision
9. 1966: Opération Fantômette
10. 1967: Les Sept Fantômettes
11. 1967: Fantômette et la Dent du Diable
12. 1968: Fantômette et son prince
13. 1968: Fantômette et le Brigand
14. 1969: Fantômette et la Lampe merveilleuse
15. 1970: Fantômette chez le roi
16. 1970: Fantômette et le Trésor du pharaon
17. 1971: Fantômette et la Maison hantée
18. 1971: Fantômette à la Mer de sable
19. 1971: Fantômette contre la Main Jaune
20. 1972: Fantômette viendra ce soir
21. 1972: Fantômette dans le piège
22. 1973: Fantômette et le Secret du désert
23. 1973: Fantômette et le Masque d'argent
24. 1973: Fantômette chez les corsaires (October 1973)
25. 1974: Fantômette contre Charlemagne (March 1974)
26. 1974: Fantômette et la Grosse Bête
27. 1974: Fantômette et le Palais sous la mer
28. 1975: Fantômette contre Diabola
29. 1975: Appelez Fantômette !
30. 1975: Olé, Fantômette !
31. 1976: Fantômette brise la glace
32. 1976: Les Carnets de Fantômette
33. 1977: C'est quelqu'un, Fantômette !
34. 1977: Fantômette dans l'espace
35. 1977: Fantômette fait tout sauter
36. 1978: Fantastique Fantômette
37. 1978: Fantômette et les 40 Milliards
38. 1979: L'Almanach de Fantômette
39. 1979: Fantômette en plein mystère
40. 1979: Fantômette et le Mystère de la tour (August 1979)
41. 1980: Fantômette et le Dragon d'or (June 1980)
42. 1981: Fantômette contre Satanix (April 1981)
43. 1982: Fantômette et la Couronne (January 1982)
44. 1982: Mission impossible pour Fantômette (October 1982)
45. 1983: Fantômette en danger (October 1983)
46. 1984: Fantômette et le Château mystérieux
47. 1984: Fantômette ouvre l'œil
48. 1985: Fantômette s'envole
49. 1987: C'est toi Fantômette !
50. 2006: Le Retour de Fantômette
51. 2007: Fantômette a la main verte
52. 2009: Fantômette et le Magicien
- Hors-serie (2011): Les Secrets de Fantômette (encyclopedia on the adventures of Fantômette containing an original novel: Fantômette amoureuse)

== Adaptations ==
=== Live-action TV series ===
The series was first adapted in 1993 (21 episodes of 24 minutes) starring Katia Sourzac. It uses the characters from the novel in original new adventures. The series was first aired on the French channels France 3 and Canal J on 20 April 1993.

- Title: Fantômette
- Realisation: Christiane Spiero, Marco Pauly, Christiane Lehérissey
- Scenario: based on the Fantômette of Georges Chaulet
- Décors: Patrick Corrand, Christian Siret, Patrick Bocquet
- Photography: Jean-Claude Hugon
- Production: Les Films du 3e étage, France 3, Méditerranée Films Productions, IMA Productions
- Country: France
- Language: French
- Number of episodes: 21 (2 seasons)
- Length of episodes: 24 minutes
- Date of first airing: 20 April 1993

=== Cartoon ===
An animated series of 26 episodes of 25 minutes each was produced in 1999. The settings are drastically different from the ones of the novels. The action takes place in an international metropolis named Furtive-Ville instead of the small fictive French city of Framboisy. The young characters have families, sometimes parents in the animated series when they had none and lived independently in the novels. (For example, Œil-de-Lynx becomes Ficelle and Boulotte's brother whereas in the books, there was absolutely no family bond between them at all). Françoise is even given a particularly dramatic family past (dead Egyptologists for parents), something that does not exist in the books. Boulotte lose her obsession with food, having instead a passion for animals, while Ficelle appear much more intelligent than in the novels.

As far as graphism goes, the Fantômette of the animated series is heavily influenced by the American animated series of the time such as Batman.

=== Comic books ===
A series of comic books following the original scenarios of Georges Chaulet was published from 1982 to 1985 for a total of four albums, drawn by François Craenhals for the first three albums and Endry for the last one.

1. Fantômette se déchaîne, Hachette, May 1982 ISBN 2-01-008210-9
2. Fantomette livre bataille, Hachette, September 1982 ISBN 2-01-008481-0
3. Fantômette risque tout, Hachette, March 1983 ISBN 2-01-008937-5
4. Fantômette fend les flots, Hachette, January 1985 ISBN 2-7333-0168-3

== Miscellaneous ==
- Fantômette appears at the end of the film La Femme invisible (2009), by Agathe Teyssier, played by Jeanne Balibar.
- In the French animated series Miraculous: Tales of Ladybug & Cat Noir, the school that protagonists Marinette Dupain-Cheng and Adrien Agreste attend is named Françoise Dupont.

== See also ==
- List of superheroines
