= Sammy (comics) =

Magazine ad for a Sammy book, featuring the stars of the series: Jack Attaway (seated with a Tommy gun) and Sammy Day, with highlights from their early adventures

Sammy is a popular humour Belgian comics series. It first started in 1970 in the weekly comic Spirou magazine, it has been published in book form, and even been the subject of several omnibus editions by Dupuis. Raoul Cauvin wrote the series while artist Berck (aka Arthur Berckmans) drew the first thirty or so adventures before being succeeded by Jean-Pol (aka Jean-Pol Van Den Broeck).

Set mainly in 1920s Chicago, the series centres on freelance bodyguards Jack Attaway and his sidekick Sammy Day. Their assignments have them protecting people from all walks of life, from young children to celebrities, fighting gangsters both at home and abroad and even facing elements of fantasy and science-fiction. The real-life gangster Al Capone and his sworn enemy Eliot Ness of the "Untouchables" are also regular characters. Although occasionally violent, the emphasis of the series is on humour.

The 40th book in the series was published in 2009 and it was announced that it would be Sammy's final adventure.

== Synopsis ==
The series is based in 1920s Chicago at the height of Prohibition. Jack Attaway runs a bodyguard agency with his sidekick Sammy Day and their adventures take them all over the world. Although their main (and rarely lucrative) activity is protecting people, the pair have occasionally worked with the police.

Jack calls Sammy "p'tit" ("kid"), while Sammy addresses him as "patron" ("boss"), but they are close friends who stick by each other through thick and thin.

Their clients have varied from the average to the bizarre: ordinary people threatened by gangsters, movie stars, eccentric millionaires, mad scientists and even a 200-year-old skeleton back from the dead. Also requesting their help are actual crooks and gangsters like Al Capone or law-enforcers like Eliot Ness.

The series has delved on a number of themes ranging from Hollywood to the Ku Klux Klan, the Mafia, espionage and protection rackets, and also more fantastic elements like robots, the undead and the elixir of youth.

== Publication history ==
Comics artist Arthur Berckmans, better known under his pen-name Berck, joined the staff of Spirou magazine in 1968 after working at rival Tintin magazine for almost ten years. His first strip at Spirou was the short-lived Mulligan, the adventures of an Irish tugboat captain in the docks of 1930s New York City. Berck wanted to draw adventures featuring gangsters, cops and robbers and it was suggested that he work with Raoul Cauvin, who had shown promise with the writing of the series Les Tuniques Bleues (French for "The Blue Coats").

Cauvin suggested a strip set in Chicago at the height of the Prohibition era which focused on a bodyguard agency rather than police or private detectives, arguing that this would give the strip a wider scope, taking the characters to various parts of the world and facing widespread situations.

The first story La Samba des gorilles (French for "Samba of the Gorillas") was published in 1970 in issues 1667 to 1677 of Spirou magazine. This was a short strip of 22 pages and was followed by a similar one later that year. Sammy was the titular star of both these stories, his boss Jack Attaway assigning him with the job of protecting people from harm and himself getting more involved later on in the plot. By the third adventure however, Jack, a classic hot-tempered but big-hearted figure, had taken over the strip with Sammy being his right-hand and providing the more common sense side of the operation. By the publishers' own admission, the series should have been called Jack Attaway et Sammy Day or just Les Gorilles (French for "gorillas", slang term for bodyguard).

The first two stories were published together in book form in 1972. Readers' reactions were positive and after four more 22-page stories, the strip evolved into the regular 44-page story format. Book editions followed, the 40th issue being published in 2009.

Berck retired in 1994 and the drawing of the strip was taken over by Jean-Pol Van Den Broeck, who goes by the pen-name "Jean-Pol".

=== Sammy gets prohibited ===
In Les Gorilles et le roi dollar ("The Gorillas and the Dollar King"), Jack and Sammy took on a network of corruption involving police, gangsters and politicians. When it appeared in book form in 1977, the French censor banned it from sale in France. The official reason was never given, but the publishers have suggested that the theme of corruption in society was too close to home for the censor's liking — a number of scandals having recently been exposed by the press. However, copies of the book were acquired in the French-speaking parts of Belgium and Switzerland, taken to France and sold "under the counter" — quite ironic for a story based on Prohibition. The ban was lifted when the book was re-submitted a few years later.

== Main characters ==
The Jack Attaway - Gorilles en tout genre ("Jack Attaway - Gorillas of All Kinds") agency: gorillas being slang for bodyguards. Before the series began the agency was made up of about 20 men, most of whom got hospitalised while protecting a court witness. Then the agency had five members, including Jack, Sammy and three others called Jacky, Freddy and Tony. The last three appeared in a handful of adventures before being phased out.

Jack Attaway: the head of the agency, rough, tough, hot-tempered but with a heart of gold. He is always willing to take on any assignment that provides a hefty fee, though he seldom gets the opportunity to cash in on it. Although an honest man, Jack is on first-name terms with many leading underworld figures, including Al Capone, as well as law-enforcers like Eliot Ness.

Sammy Day: Jack's sidekick. They refer to one another as "boss" and "kid", but are close friends. Sammy tends to be the more level-headed of the two. He is more cautious than his boss, querying their missions, especially when they fail to get the full details beforehand (which Jack later regrets) but standing by him through thick and thin anyway — though it often means getting little in return in terms of monetary value for either of them and often ending up in hospital or even the insane asylum.

Al Capone and Eliot Ness hold a typically "pleasant" conversation

Al Capone: Chicago's most powerful gangster, who sometimes calls on Jack and Sammy to protect him from other crime lords. They do so grudgingly, though Capone's money can be a very powerful incentive.

Eliot Ness: the leader of the Untouchables, often calls on Sammy and Jack to help him in his feud with Al Capone and other crooks like Miss Kay.

Mrs Attaway aka Miss Kay: Jack's mother, a charming little old lady who is well aware that her son's business is not as successful as he makes out. She thus tries to find ways of raising a fortune which he will then inherit. To that end she has taken the name of "Miss Kay", recruited some pensioners from a local old folks home and gone into alcohol-smuggling and other illegal businesses. Sammy soon discovers this, but he also knowns how shattered Jack would be on knowing the truth: at one stage the dilemma even leads him to a nervous breakdown!

Lady O: a young woman who is an expert on weapons, martial arts and disguises. Originally hired by Capone after Ness had arrested his lieutenants, she then turned against the master criminal, aiming to take over his empire, with Sammy, Jack and Ness getting caught in the crossfire!

== Stories ==
The Sammy series has not been published in English. Below is a list of the French titles, their year of publication, an English translation of the titles and a brief description. They are listed in order of publication.

Title	Publication	English Translation	Writer	Artist
"La Samba des gorilles"	1970	[The Samba of the Gorillas]	Raoul Cauvin	Berck
Mister Harris is the MOST targeted man in Chicago. In their attempts to dispose of him his enemies have already hospitalised a dozen of Jack Attaway's bodyguards. The only way to recoup on his expenses is for Jack to keep the annoying little man alive, long enough for him to testify in court and collect the large reward offered for the exposure of crime lord Rocco — but can even Sammy last longer than his predecessors?
"Des Mômes et des gorilles"	1970	[Kids and Gorillas]	Raoul Cauvin	Berck
The offer of protecting two young ladies from harm is very tempting — until you discover that the ladies in question are young enough to be toddlers! In any case, the fact that they, the daughters of a wealthy man, are the targets of kidnappers means that Sammy has little choice but to stick to the assignment.
"gag"	1970	[short gag]	Raoul Cauvin	Berck
"Bon vieux pour les gorilles"	1970	[Old Boys for the Gorillas]	Raoul Cauvin	Berck
Jack and Sammy are hired to watch over the occupants of an old folks home — made up of retired gangsters! The pensioners' hobbies include exploding dynamite, firing machine-guns and pickpocketing and they also hate one another with a passion! No wonder so many of the home's staff have already quit.
"Gorilles et spaghetti"	1971	[Gorillas and Spaghetti]	Raoul Cauvin	Berck
Gangster Tonio Garcia escapes from prison with only one aim in mind: to get rival crime lord Jose Lumbago, the one who betrayed him to the police. Jose calls on Sammy and Jack to escort him to safety, boasting that he has thought of everything to cover his escape — but so has Tonio.
"Gorilles et robots"	1972	[Gorillas and Robots]	Raoul Cauvin	Berck
Booley and Dooley are twins, mad scientists and hate each other to boot. They have each built their own robot, both machines created with the sole purpose of destroying the other — with Jack, Sammy and some double-crossing crooks caught in the mêlée.
"gag"	1972	[short gag]	Raoul Cauvin	Berck
"Les Gorilles marquent des poings"	1972	[The Gorillas Score Hits]	Raoul Cauvin	Berck
A manager hires Sammy and Jack to watch over his boxer who has been targeted by a crooked rival. (This story features a cameo of Clarence D. Russell's Pete the Tramp whose strips were published in Europe.)
"Rhum row"	1972	[Rum Row]	Raoul Cauvin	Berck
A police inspector asks Sammy and Jack to go undercover and trace the route of smuggled alcohol which ends up at the rum row, a group of casino-ships anchored beyond territorial waters. Joining forces with the formidable Captain Ron Kalbery, they face pirates, coast guards, storms and the ruthless competitiveness of other smugglers.
"El presidente"	1973	[El Presidente]	Raoul Cauvin	Berck
Firmin Deramelier is the President of a small island who wants Jack to train his bungling and incompetent presidential guard, and will even go so far as to subtly kidnap Jack's beloved mother in order to obtain his reluctant co-operation. (Firmin Deramelier was inspired by dictator Jean-Claude Duvalier (aka "Baby Doc") who was dictator of Haiti at the time, while rebel leader Chico bears more than a passing resemblance to Fidel Castro.)
"Le Gorille à huit pattes"	1974	[The Eight-Footed Gorilla]	Raoul Cauvin	Berck
A man staggers into Jack's office, goes through the window and ends up on a flagpole before hitting the pavement. Furthermore he has multiple knife and gunshot wounds and a deadly spider in his possession. The trail leads Sammy and Jack to Sicily, and multiple attempts to get hold of the box containing the spider, but goes cold due to the "rule of silence" imposed by the local Black Hand.
"Les Gorilles font les fous"	1974	[The Gorillas Go Crazy]	Raoul Cauvin	Berck
Almost killed in a drive-by shooting, Aldo "the Weasel" Colmaris is comatose, his life and sanity hanging by a thread. However, his evidence could be crucial to nail the "Godmother" of the underworld so Sammy and Jack are assigned to protect him: not easy in a hospital overrun with hitmen, an erratic doctor on the verge of a nervous breakdown and a gossipy nurse.
"Les Gorilles et le roi dollar"	1975	[The Gorillas and the Dollar King]	Raoul Cauvin	Berck
Police detective Clay Anderson asks Sammy and Jack to help break up a network of corruption involving police, gangsters and politicians, and before long their campaign of sabotage tries the nerves and patience of crime lord Luciano. (see Sammy gets prohibited for more on this story.)
"Les Gorilles au pensionnat"	1975	[The Gorillas at Boarding School]	Raoul Cauvin	Berck
The principal of a college for young ladies calls on Jack and Sammy for assistance. Her charges are the daughters of crooks, spies, pickpockets and pyromaniacs, and in many cases have inherited the habits of their parents. As if trying to enforce discipline was not hard enough, one of the girls is targeted by gangsters who want to know the location of her father's stolen loot.
"Les Pétroleurs du désert"	1976	[The Desert Oilmen]	Raoul Cauvin	Berck
Middle Eastern Emir Siman El Boyard hires Sammy and Jack to watch over his only oil well which is under threat by his rival Abor El Saizy. El Saizy for his part has already found oil and bought fighter planes and tanks for his army, while all the Gorillas have are their Tommy guns and revolvers.
"Nuit blanche pour les gorilles"	1976	[A Sleepless Night for the Gorillas]	Raoul Cauvin	Berck
Jack and Sammy investigate when a model prison becomes the scene of a never-ending stream of inmate suicides. Before long they discover that it just a cover for escaping prisoners, but before they can get anywhere on that they are distracted by sightings of vampires in the vicinity.
"L’Élixir de jeunesse"	1977	[The Elixir of Youth]	Raoul Cauvin	Berck
An elderly and irritable millionaire believes that the elixir of youth is in a sunken galleon in the Caribbean and gets Sammy and Jack to accompany him to find it. As if dealing with a bad-tempered and demanding old man was not enough, there is also his ambitious nephew and his henchmen who intend to get their hands on his wealth.
"gag"	1978	[short gag]	Raoul Cauvin	Berck
"Le Grand frisson"	1978	[The Great Freeze]	Raoul Cauvin	Berck
Two scientists, Hans and Vonder, perfect an atomic battery, but things go wrong and the energy meant for the battery ends up inside Vonder instead. Although he does not suffer serious injuries he has become a living battery, giving off huge amounts of heat. Hans hires Sammy and Jack to escort Vonder to the Arctic in order that he can feel more at ease, while protecting him from crooks who intend to use him for military purposes.
"Une si jolie petite plage"	1979	[Such a Pretty Little Beach]	Raoul Cauvin	Berck
A beach would be an ideal spot for a short break if it weren't for the shark who terrorises the area.
"Les Gorilles marquent un but"	1980	[The Gorillas Score a Goal]	Raoul Cauvin	Berck
Two rival football teams use underhand tactics to force one another out of the competition. Hired by the coach of one of the teams, Sammy and Jack must become players themselves and face the consequences: if they win they'll be attacked by the teams' opponents, if they lose they'll be attacked by the team's supporters. To cap it all, the rival team will not wait for the game itself to knock them out of the match. (In this story, the creators look into the theme of football hooliganism and stadium riots in particular.)
"Les Bons comptes de Noël font les bons amis"	1980	[The Best Scores at Xmas Make the Best Friends]	Raoul Cauvin	Berck
"Les Gorilles à Hollywood"	1980	[The Gorillas in Hollywood]	Raoul Cauvin	Berck
On screen, Randolf Valentini is a dashing man of action, but off-screen he's more of a mound of trembling jelly, so when the Mafia threatens the production of his latest film he quickly flees the set. Fortunately for the producer, Jack Attaway happens to be the spitting image of Randolf so he's ideal to complete the picture, but Jack soon finds that the Mafia is nothing compared to a fanatical female following. (Whereas Les Gorilles marquent un but looked at man-dominated football hooliganism, this story looks at out-of-hand celebrity fan adoration, represented mainly by women who chased after such figures as Rudolph Valentino. Cauvin, who once worked in animation, features as the film director's assistant.)
"Ces Drôles de dames"	1981	[Strange Ladies]	Raoul Cauvin	Berck
"Ku–Klux–Klan"	1981	[Ku–Klux–Klan]	Raoul Cauvin	Berck
In the Deep South, Sammy and Jack encounter hostility from both sides of the racial divide, corrupt officialdom and the infamous Ku Klux Klan.
"Ma Sammy"	1982	[Ma Sammy]	Raoul Cauvin	Berck
"Les Bébés flingueurs"	1983	[The Gunbabies]	Raoul Cauvin	Berck
A group of gangsters turned into babies by the elixir of youth set off to settle their scores with their enemy and Jack and Sammy find that armed toddlers can be just as dangerous as fully-grown adults.
"Panique au vatican"	1983	[Panic at the Vatican]	Raoul Cauvin	Berck
Sammy and Jack are sent by the Secret Service to recover a metallic tube which a spy has hidden in a church in Rome. Sounds simple at first, but they soon discover that they are facing some tough competition in the form of agents from various countries, including a karate-kicking Japanese woman.
"Ma Attaway"	1984	[Ma Attaway]	Raoul Cauvin	Berck
Jack's beloved mother has moved to Chicago and it's important for him not to let her realise that business is not as good as he has told her. But Mrs Attaway is not one to be easily deceived and Sammy soon finds that she has hit on a radical, if dubious, solution to Jack's problems.
"Les Gorilles en piste"	1985	[The Gorillas in the Ring]	Raoul Cauvin	Berck
Jack and Sammy are sent to find Boris Kazamadjove who has the files of his late brother Igor, a specialist in biological warfare, and is offering them to the highest bidder. They and other agents infiltrate the circus run by another brother, Ivan, by putting on various performances, but someone is determined to reduce the competition by making the "death-defying" acts live up to their names.
"Miss Kay"	1986	[Miss Kay]	Raoul Cauvin	Berck
Eliot Ness of the Untouchables asks Jack to help him track down Miss Kay, a notorious supplier of illegal alcohol, on the basis that she cannot know him. But Sammy knows that Ness couldn't be more wrong: Miss Kay knows Jack better than anyone since she happens to be his own mother and keeping this a secret from him turns out to be more than Sammy's nerves can take.
"L’Homme qui venait de l’au–delà"	1986	[The Man who came from Beyond]	Raoul Cauvin	Berck
Samuel Ranson asks Sammy and Jack to help him recover the fortune swindled away by crooks from his great-great-great-grandson. Jack's not one to turn down a client but a 200-year-old skeleton back from the dead may prove very trying for his own well-being, especially since they have to take on a training camp of mercenaries.
"Verglas"	1986	[Black Ice]	Raoul Cauvin	Berck
"La Diva"	1987	[The Diva]	Raoul Cauvin	Berck
Sandra Harvey is a talented singer, wealthy, beautiful, healthy and devout. Everything is against her. Pursued by her fans, harassed by the press, pressured by offers of marriage, she desperately turns to Jack and Sammy to protect her from all these intrusions into her life, but is that possible when, even for them, it's a case of love at first sight? (This story dwells on the issue of tabloid journalism and the pressures celebrities can face from both the public and the media.)
"Du Rififi dans les nuages"	1988	[Chaos in the Clouds]	Raoul Cauvin	Berck
When the building of a skyscraper comes under threat by protection racketeers, Sammy and Jack argue as to who should keep a watch out at the top of the tower, "vertigo" being a common problem with both of them. Of course, it should the boss to take responsibility so Jack makes Sammy the boss — at least until the conclusion of the case.
"Le Mandarin"	1989	[The Mandarin]	Raoul Cauvin	Berck
At Ness' request Sammy and Jack break up a Chinese alcohol distillery. Later a heavyweight and powerful Chinese crime lord literally breaks into their office and breaks even more of the furniture. Thus the two Gorillas are forced to go into hiding before their necks get the same treatment, but where can you hide in a country full of Chinese informants?
"Crash à Wall Street"	1989	[Wall Street Crash]	Raoul Cauvin	Berck
Millionaire Gilles Palance lives in a palace-like home, has an army of servants, a collection of fine cars and a hoard of starlets for company. He even hires Sammy and Jack as bodyguards as part of the image. Life seems ideal but when things go wrong at the stock market they find that his life was more of an image than they thought.
"Les Gorilles ont du chien"	1990	[A Dog's Life for the Gorillas]	Raoul Cauvin	Berck
Eléonore Dukakiskoff, an eccentric Russian Duchess, hires Sammy and Jack to watch over her beloved Pekingese while she is away. They soon find that others have also set their sights on the dog and not as pet lovers.
"Cigarettes et whisky"	1991	[Cigarettes and Whisky]	Raoul Cauvin	Berck
Dave Kennedy lives in a run-down shack on the property of his wealthy uncle, who owns a palatial home in the same area. The problem is that Dave is a chain-smoking, heavy-drinking, womanising slob who has to change his ways in order to inherit his uncle's fortune and will only be able to achieve this by force. Getting this human wreckage back into shape in hard enough for Sammy and Jack without Al Capone suddenly turning up with plans of his own.
"Des Gorilles et des folles"	1992	[Gorillas and Crazy Women]	Raoul Cauvin	Berck
Three widows, who lost their husbands to alcohol, hire Sammy and Jack to protect them while they break up the illegal bars spread around the city. It's not long of course before Capone gets involved and Jack faces a deal with the devil.
"Les Gorilles portent jupons"	1993	[The Gorillas in Skirts]	Raoul Cauvin	Berck
Steffy Granger escapes from prison and goes into hiding. Since he was a potential witness against Capone it is essential to find him. The trail leads Sammy and Jack to a bar frequented by transvestites and find themselves having to mix in more ways than one. Then Ness and Capone appear, also on Granger's trail — and adopting similar tactics!
"L’Alcool aux pruneaux"	1994	[Pruned Alcohol]	Raoul Cauvin	Berck
Jack is tired of trying to make a living from an honest job and getting next-to-no financial reward in return so he decides to go into producing alcohol and other dubious activities. Sammy is not too keen on this, especially when it puts Jack in competition with Capone and Miss Kay.
"La B.A. des gorilles"	1995	[The Gorillas' Good Deed]	Raoul Cauvin	Jean-Pol
A raid on one of Capone's distilleries results in Ness suffering serious head injuries and memory loss. As a result he comes to believe that he is a priest, giving blessings wherever he goes. If either Capone or Ness' superiors find out then it could spell the end of the Untouchables so Sammy and Jack have to hide him and go to great lengths to restore him to normal.
"Un Gorille en cage"	1996	[A Caged Gorilla]	Raoul Cauvin	Jean-Pol
While sheltering from the rain in the home of a zoologist, Jack tries out what he thinks is some brandy only to find himself turning into a gorilla — and a literal one at that.
"Mae West"	1997	[Mae West]	Raoul Cauvin	Jean-Pol
The famous actress Mae West asks Jack and Sammy to protect her. There have been several attempts on her life and she suspects it to be someone whose advances she rejected — the problem being that there have been so many she can't think who it could be.
"Les Gorilles mènent la danse"	1998	[The Gorillas Lead the Dance]	Raoul Cauvin	Jean-Pol
When a young immigrant called Antonio steals $200,000 from gangster Frankie Diamond, the latter sends his men to kill both Antonio and his sister Lolita who rushes to Jack and Sammy for help. With Jack and Lolita forced to participate in a never-ending dance marathon, Sammy tries to negotiate a solution to the problem, made all the more complicated by the involvement of Al Capone.
"Papy Day"	2000	[Papy Day]	Raoul Cauvin	Jean-Pol
Gangster "Crazy" Jerry fakes his own death and then sets off to settle his scores with rival Al Capone who, in terror for his life, turns to Jack and Sammy for help. The problem is that Jerry has undergone plastic surgery and nobody now knows what he looks like. (This story highlights the issue of nursing homes where residents are ill-treated and bullied by the staff.)
"Lady O"	2002	[Lady O]	Raoul Cauvin	Jean-Pol
When Ness catches Capone's henchmen red-handed in criminal activity, Capone hires a young woman called Lady O who proves more than up to the job of replacing them. However she also proves to be quite ambitious and turns on her employer with Sammy, Jack and Ness caught in the crossfire — which is not her only means of striking terror.
"Deux Gorilles à Paris"	2003	[Two Gorillas in Paris]	Raoul Cauvin	Jean-Pol
Elderly millionaire Harry Moons sends Jack and Sammy to Paris in order to find out if his estranged nephew is capable of taking over his huge fortune. When they arrive in the French capital it is to find Jean-François-Ferdinand Moons in a lunatic asylum complete with gag and straitjacket and aggressive tendencies. This hardly makes him ideal to run the family business, but getting a raving madman off their hands proves easier said than done.
"Les Pépées flingueuses"	2005	[The Gunladies]	Raoul Cauvin	Jean-Pol
Multiple attacks on Capone's business empire and attempts on his own life lead him to a nervous breakdown. Ness suspects that another would-be kingpin is out to take over and it does not take long for Sammy to discover that Lady O is back in town. With Ness now her target and facing a breakdown of his own, Jack suggests that the best way to counter a woman is another woman, but is Mae West really the best option?
"Un Scénariste chez les gorilles"	2008	[A Scriptwriter at the Gorillas]	Zidrou	Jean-Pol
"Boy"	2009	[Boy]	Raoul Cauvin	Jean-Pol
Sammy and Jack meet Boy, a young child who lives in an orphanage. Boy wants their help to find his father, but the only lead is a taxi driver who takes him a present on his birthday every year. Not much to go on, and the Gorillas soon find themselves facing quite a few surprises in their investigation.
