= Jean Dratz =

Belgian painter and illustrator

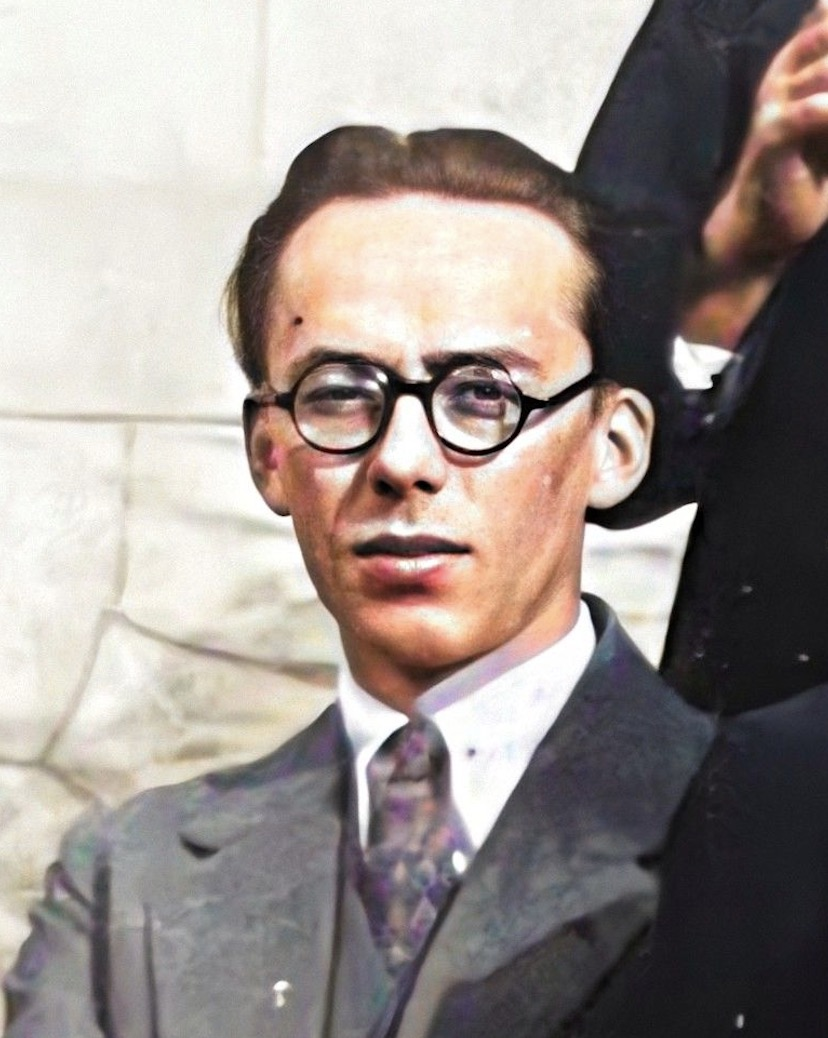
Jean Dratz in 1925

Jean Pierre Gustave Dratz (1903–1967) was a Belgian painter and illustrator.

== Biography ==
Dratz was born in Mont-Saint-Guibert, Belgium, on 16 March 1903 as the son and student of Constant Dratz. He first married Eliane D'Hondt (1904–1941) on 3 March 1926. Together, they had a daughter, Corinne (1933–2021). They divorced on 28 September 1936, and he later married Emma Baecken in Koekelberg (Brussels), on 15 February 1939. He studied Law and Economy at the Université libre de Bruxelles. As an artist, he is best known for his sober, realistic and melancholic Belgian landscapes which show Japanese influences. Other works were inspired by his travels in France and Italy.

Well known as a caricaturist and illustrator, he was a co-founder of the association of Belgian humoristic artist "Mine Souriante". He was the editor-in-chief of the French-language version of the Belgian comics magazine Bravo, where he also contributed numerous illustrations. He also created numerous theatre decors, and contributed the decoration for the national pavilions of Brazil and Chile at the 1935 World Exhibition of Brussels, and of the national pavilion of the Republic of the Congo at the Expo 58.

He was sometimes nicknamed "The Belgian Dubout".

He died in Uccle (Brussels) in October 1967.

== Works ==
=== Book illustrations ===
- Les jours de l'homme by Docteur Besançon – Edition Terres Latines - no date.
- Le visage de la femme by Docteur Besançon – Edition Terres Latines - no date.
- Ne pas dételer by Docteur Besançon – Edition Terres Latines - no date.
- Petit Bréviaire de l'amateur de vin by Henri Brochier – Numerous reeditions.
- Histoires extraordinaires by Edgar Allan Poe - Edition Nilsson - 1929.
- Scène de la vie de Bohème by Henri Murger - Edition Nilsson - no date.
- Knock ou le triomphe de la Médecine by Jules Romains - Edition Terres Latines - [1965].
- Le Naïf aux quarante enfants by Paul Guth - Imprimerie Scheerders van Kerchove - no date.
- Trois hommes dans un bateau by Jerome K. Jerome - Edition La Boétie - 1944.
- Bel Ami by Guy de Maupassant - Imprimerie L.F.De Vos & Cie. S.A.- no date.
- Les Œuvres by François Villon - Edition de la Nef d'Argent - 1943.
- Clochemerle by Gabriel Chevallier - Edition Terres Latines - no date.
- Zuur en Zoet by Victor Thijs - Edition Ontwikkeling - 1945.
- Contes pour les enfants by A. Huvelle-Levé - Edition Office de Publicité - 1927.
- Le berger des étoiles by Maurice Des Ombiaux - Edition Office de Publicité - 1928.
- Le Petit homme de la Gare by Adrienne Jelley-Bruyère alias Danièle Vindor - Edition Office de Publicité - 1929.
- Le Voyage d'Agrément by Adrienne Jelley-Bruyère alias Danièle Vindor - Edition Office de Publicité - 1937.
- Mounch de Adrienne Jelley-Bruyère alias Danièle Vindor - Edition Office de Publicité - 1933.
- Les véridiques histoires de tante Hélène by Hélène de Harven - Edition Office de Publicité
- Souvenir et Anecdotes by C. Perlès - Edition Office de Publicité - 1925.
- Bobby Histoire d'un chien by Aimé De Cort - Edition Office de Publicité - French-language version in 1934, Dutch-language version in 1939.
- Le Roman d'un Lapin Blanc et d'autres contes by Aline Eberhart-Sorel - Edition Office de Publicité - 1938.
- Robert "le diable" by Aline Eberhart-Sorel - Edition Office de Publicité - 1933.
- Histoire d'un petit "Teddy" by Aline Eberhart-Sorel - Edition Office de Publicité - 1932.
- Par-dessus les Clochers by Hubert Stiernet - Edition Office de Publicité - 1931.
- Le Roman du chien et de l'enfant by Louis Delattre - Edition Office de Publicité - 1924 and 1933.
- Quand nous étions petits... Contes vrais by Giovannotti - Edition Office de Publicité - 1927.
- L'Espagne de Franco by André Villers, 1903-?, born in Grez-Doiceau, Belgium - Edition Ecran du monde - 1955.
- Comme sur des Roulettes by André Villers, 1903-?, Born in Grez-Doiceau, Belgium - Edition de la Paix - 1955.
- Drôles de Bêtes by André Villers, 1903-?, Born in Grez-Doiceau, Belgium - Edition La Renaissance du Livre - 1953.
- Jacky et Sambo by André Villers, 1903-?, Born in Grez-Doiceau, Belgium - Edition La Renaissance du Livre - 1951.
- Arsène et Chrysostome by André Villers, 1903-?, Born in Grez-Doiceau, Belgium - Edition l'Églantine - 1931.
- La Gerbe des Tendresses by Charles Moureaux - Printing Cie. Liège - no date.
- Saint-Josse-ten-Noode by José Camby - presses des Editions et Impressions Contemporaines (EDIMCO, S. A.) - 1952.
- Les Fables de Pitjes Schramouille by Roger Kervyn - Edition Rex - 1931.
- Mon Oncle et son écluse by Luca Rizzardi - Edition du Cercle d'Art - 1949.
- De l'Anarchie au t.s. Sacrement by Paul Bay - Edition l'Églantine - 1932.
- Hardi Montarchain by Pierre Hubermont - Edition l'Églantine - 1932.
- Pour lire en Parachute by Jean Dess alias Hixe - Edition l'Églantine - 1932.
- Nous ou le Député Piret dans ses terres by Marianne and Marc-Antoine Pierson - Edition Office de Publicité - 1936.
- De la cuisine et... voilà tout by Paul Bouillard - Edition Albin Michel - no date.
- Collette Diplomate by Maurice Darin - Edition Albert - 1937.
- Le Mariage d'Evariste Lambert by Anicet Lenoir - Edition La Nef de Paris - 1954.
- Regards sur notre Congo by Julien Vanhove - Edition La Renaissance du Livre - 1943.
- A nos Héros coloniaux morts pour la civilisation (1876–1909) published by la ligue des souvenirs Congolais 1931.
- La Prise de Troie by Virgil - Edition de la belle plume - 1931.
- Le Manuel du Parfait Mobilisé du Caporal by Jean Dratz and Baud - Edition Pim Services - no date.
- Le code pénal by Jacques Nyns - Edition Ysy Brachot Fils - 1950.

=== Press illustrations ===
Among the many illustrations he made for numerous magazines can be mentioned:

- Editor-in-chief of Bravo, numerous illustrations.
- Monthly magazine "Le Bouclier" published by the prévoyance sociale Belge.
- Covers for the weekly "Pourquoi Pas?"
- Automobile and tourism publications: Royal Auto, Auto Touring, Reflet du Tourisme, Touring Club de Belgique, Libra illustré
- Annuals for the Royal Automobile Club de Belgique (1950 and 1953)
- Cover of the weekly Tintin magazine on 28 January 1953.
- Englebert magazine
- Jeunesse, magazine of the Belgian Red Cross.
- Art Savoir Beauté magazine
- La Conquête de l'Air magazine
- Toute l'Alimentation food magazine
- Weekly magazine Le Soir Illustré between 1932 and 1940.

Furthermore, he made illustrations for records, student magazines, post cards, and publicity.
