= Zonneland =

Dutch-language Belgian magazine

- Logo of Zonneland, issue 23
- Categories: Children's magazine
- Frequency: Weekly
- Circulation: 84,500
- Publisher: Uitgeverij Averbode
- Founded: 1920; 105 years ago
- Company: Plantyn
- Country: Belgium
- Based in: Averbode, Belgium
- Language: Dutch

Zonneland is a Belgian Dutch-language youth magazine published by Averbode since 1920. A French version called Petits Belges also started in the same year. It changed its name to Tremplin in 1960.

== History and profile ==
Zonneland was first published in 1920, and by 1922 had 100,000 subscribers. It was a catholic magazine, directed and published by the Averbode Abbey. It shared some elements with Petits Belges, but the French language version had less purely catholic contents and more stories and general information. Between 1929 and 1934, Petits Belges was replaced by a magazine for girls (Stella) and one for boys (Cadet).

In 1930, the first of the long-running series of Vlaamse Filmpjes (complete stories of 32 pages, published every week or every two weeks) was inserted as a supplement to Zonneland.

By 1935, Zonneland had dropped to 60,000 subscribers, while Petits Belges only was printed in 28,000 copies. In 1936, Father Daniel De Kesel became the new editor-in-chief, and started writing articles using the pen name "Nonkel Fons". He remained in charge until 1984. The magazines had to suspend publication between September 1943 and November 1944 due to the censoring and paper shortage during the war. In 1966, Zonneland had nearly 120,000 subscribers, and by 1976 this had increased to 135,000.

Zonneland was initially aimed at all children aged 7 to 12, but later got more specifically targeted towards 10- and 11-years old children. For younger children Averbode started publishing Dopido (2-3 years, from 1990) Doremi (1-5 years, from 1965 on), Zonnekind (6-7 years, from 1958 on), and Zonnestraal (8-9 years, from 1966 on), while children between 12 and 15 got Top magazine (1973, replaced by iD in 1995 ), and the 16- and 17-years old were reached through Yell (1981).

Well-known authors who published in Zonneland include Edward Poppe, John Flanders, Ernest Claes, and Leopold Vermeiren. Comics authors include Jan Waterschoot, Jeff Broeckx, Jean-Pol, Renaat Demoen, Gray Croucher, Berck, Buth, and François Craenhals. Petits Belges published some of the first works by Jijé.
