= Averbode (publisher) =

Belgian publisher of books and magazines

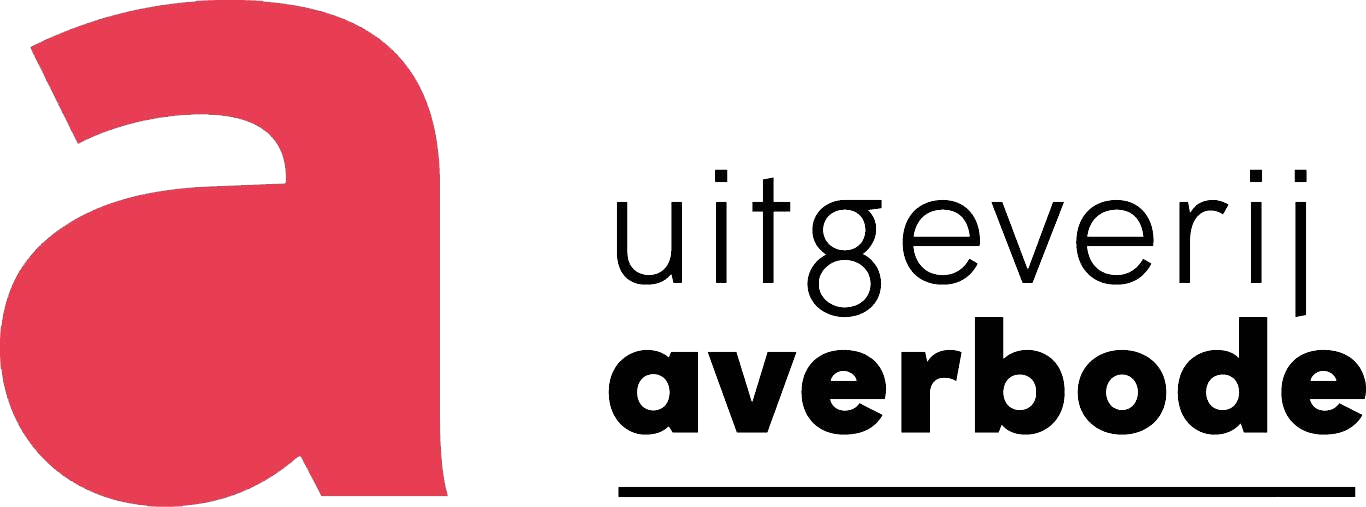
- Parent company: Plantyn
- Founded: 1920
- Country of origin: Belgium
- Headquarters location: Averbode, Belgium
- Publication types: Books, magazines, children's literature, education literature
- Official website: uitgeverijaverbode.be

Uitgeverij Averbode is a Belgian publisher of books, comics, and magazines. The company is located in Averbode and is part of the Averbode Abbey. It has changed its name a few times since its foundation in 1877.

== Names ==
Altiora Averbode has been known as "Goede Pers", "Altiora", "Altiora Averbode", "N.V. Altiora", "N.V. Averbode", and now "Uitgeverij Averbode".

== History ==
=== 1877–1918 ===
From 1877 on, with the creation of the Brotherhood of Our Lady of the Sacred Heart, the abbey made a lot of publications to reach out to all the members of the Brotherhood and for promotion. To reduce the costs, on 14 February 1881, a small printing press was bought in Paris, and started producing flyers and other material. Already in 1882, a second printing press and a paper cutting machine were added.

By 1885, the Brotherhood has 25,000 members, and in 1886 the members' magazine Bode der Aartsbroederschap van O.-L.-Vrouw van het H. Hart was created as a monthly, which changed to a biweekly magazine in 1887. A French edition followed in 1895. To make this possible, a new press was bought in 1885, and a steam driven press was added in 1890. The circulation of both magazines together increased to nearly 100,000 at the start of World War I. Other publications soon followed, with different parish newspapers in 1904, and the weekly Averbode's Weekblad in 1907. The Abbey also printed for other customers, and produced a few books as well.

Two rotary printing presses were bought in 1897 and 1898, and electric power was installed in 1903. At the time, about 80 people, mainly men, worked in the factory, then called "Drukkerij van Averbode" or "Drukkerij van de abdij van Averbode" ("Printing of Averbode" or "Printing of the Abbey of Averbode"). It was at the time one of the major employers of the town, and was crucial in the coming of the tramway in 1900 and the post office in 1909 to Averbode. At the start of World War 1, some 267,000 magazines were published and printed weekly in Averbode.Most of this economic activity came to a halt during the first World War though.

=== 1919–1940 ===
After the war, the Brotherhood had lost much of its momentum, and the Abbey started the "Eucharistische Kruistocht" ("Eucharistic Crusade") in 1920, as a means to get the Christian faith to the youth of Belgium. The printing continued some old publications, especially Averbode's Weekblad, but the new magazines Zonneland (Sun Country) and its French language counterpart Petits Belges (Small Belgians) soon became very popular as well. To print these magazines, a new four colour press was bought in 1924.

The 1920s were a period of expansion, with the success of the Eucharistic Crusade as the motor. New magazines appeared all the time, and the publication of books started to boom as well from 1925 on. The cultural magazine Hooger Leven (Higher Life) started in 1927, and Vlaamsche Filmkens (Flemish Movies), a weekly story of 32 pages for the youth, debuted in 1930. New presses were also bought for commercial printing, with limited success. Finally, in 1932 the existing magazine Ons Land (Our Country) was acquired. All decisions and control was still done by the monks of the abbey, and in the early 1930s, it became obvious that the printing had acquired a large debt which even threatened the abbey itself. In 1934, the debt was estimated to be 27 million Belgian Francs, which, keeping inflation in mind, would amount to more than 17 million Euros currently. TO resolve this, a new structure was created, with professional external help for the financial part. The printing was no longer a part of the same company as the abbey and was renamed "Altiora". All activities were scrutinized, and those that created the losses were dropped, while new, more commercial activities were started. The circulation of Ons Land rose from 16,000 in 1932 to 60,000 in 1938. From 1937 on, the printing started to make a profit, and continued to do so until 1943, when due to World War II, most activities had to be stopped.

=== 1940–1945 ===
During the second World War, the printing was much restricted. Most publications of Averbode first continued, but soon the number of pages and the frequency dropped, due to rationing, even though the popularity of most publications soared. The biggest success was Ons Land, with a circulation of nearly 130,000 copies in May 1942. The magazine became gradually more German-friendly, although it never became a true propaganda magazine, and only ceased publication in May 1944, when the paper rationing was at its worst, and when the supply of electricity couldn't be assured any longer. The shortage of paper and other materials had already led to the end of the publications of Vlaamsche Filmkens, Zonneland, Petits Belges and other popular magazines in 1943. On 6 May 1942, a fire destroyed most of the printing. Due to a high insurance, this fire together with the success of the magazines led to a serious reduction of the debts of the abbey. The larger abbey fire of 29 December 1942, did not touch the printing factory, but strained the resources and manpower of the abbey even further.

=== After 1945 ===
Altiora sold the profitable but due to its too German friendly contents during the War tainted magazine Ons Land in 1946, although it was further printed in Averbode until 1959. Some other publications did not restart after the war, but the biggest successes all returned. In November 1944, Zonneland, Petits Belges, Averbode's Weekblad and La Semaine all restarted.

Things went rather uneventful until the 1960s, when the market in Belgium changed drastically. While the youth magazines of Averbode flowered and multiplied fared the adult magazines like Averbode's Weekblad and La Semaine worse. Averbode's Weekblad disappeared in 1964 with a circulation of less than 10,000, and La Semaine ended four years later. These losses were compensated by the appearance of Zonnekind (1958), Doremi (first called Prutske, 1963), and Zonnestraal (1966). With the addition of Top in 1973, these youth magazines, mainly distributed through Catholic schools, had a combined circulation of 400,000. The number of employees varied between 200 and 300 in those years.

The 1973 oil crisis was felt heavily in Belgium, and Altiora (the printing) and Goede Pers (the publisher) plunged deep into the red. New investments were delayed until the end of the 1970s, and it took until the mid-1980s before the worst had passed and the finances were once again healthy. Altiora expanded, and started to attract clients from outside Belgium as well, raising the turnover to over 1 billion Belgian Francs (25 million Euro). In the 1990s, the structure of the company once again changed. All printing activities were renamed to Agora in 1997, and formed no longer a part of the abbey. The book publishing activities were centralized in Uitgeverij Altiora Averbode in 1993, and all magazines were grouped in Goede Pers in 1993, which was renamed to Uitgeverij Averbode in 2000.

== Publications ==
By 2000, Averbode had published about 146 magazines, some with a circulation of over 100,000, and over 8,000 books, with nearly 2,000 books for adults (mainly religiously inspired), and over 6,000 youth books.

=== Magazines ===
Averbode is probably best known for its youth magazines which were distributed via the Catholic schools in Belgium.

The magazines had many famous Belgian authors amongst its contributors, including Ernest Claes and Jijé, but the one author most associated with the magazines is probably Jean Ray, writing as "John Flanders".

Major magazines include:

Title	First year	Last year	Remarks
Bode	1886	1972	Name changed from Bode der Aartsbroederschap van O.-L.-Vrouw van het H. Hart to shorter versions over the years. Circulations was around 10,000 from the 1930s to the late 1960s
Messager	1895	1968	French version of the Bode, originally called Messager de l'Archiconfrérie du Notre-Dame du Sacré-Coeur. Circulation was only about 2,000 in the 1950s and 1960s
Averbode's Weekblad	1907	1964	Circulation ranged from 54,000 in 1920 to less than 20,000 from 1954 on. Changed its name to Het Weekblad in 1956 and to MK-Het Weekblad in 1961
La Semaine	1907	1968	French version of Averbode's Weekblad. Circulation reached 56,000 by 1929, but dropped below 20,000 in 1956
Zonneland	1920		Main magazine for the Catholic youth, distributed via schools. Originally for all youth from 6 to 14, now aimed at children of 10–12 years old. Circulation reached already 110,000 in 1924, dropped again to 60,000 by 1935, but again reached about 100,000 by 1966, and 135,000 in 1976
Petits Belges	1920		French version of Zonneland. Changed its name to Tremplin in 1960. Circulation varied between 20,000 and 50,000
E.K. Berichten	1925	1968	Magazine for the participants of the "Eucharistische Kruistocht". Circulation was between 2,000 and 3,000 for all of its life
Hooger Leven	1927	1938	Cultural and literary magazine, led by Gerard Walschap. Circulation was only slightly above 3,000
Vlaamse Filmpjes	1930		Originally called Vlaamsche Filmkens, they had an initial circulation of nearly 50,000. After World War 2, this dropped to between 5,000 and 7,000
Ons Land	1932	1944	Had a circulation of only 16,000 when Averbode bought it in 1932, but quickly raised to 127,000 by 1943. Sold after the second World War
Presto Films	1934	1940	French version of Vlaamse Filmpjes. Circulation dropped from 6,000 to under 3,000 in its short existence
Vlam	1937	1969	Magazine for older members of the "Eucharistische Kruistocht". Circulation was over 10,000 until the end of the war, but dropped to below 5,000 afterwards
Zonnekind	1958		Aimed at 6 to 8 years old, it reached a circulation of over 100,000 by 1964, and 130,000 in 1976
Zonnestraal	1966		Aimed at 8 to 10 years old, its circulation reached 100,000 after only two years, in 1968, further increasing to over 137,000 in 1976
Bonjour	1960		French version of Zonnekind. Circulation rose from an initial 8,000 to over 30,000 by 1968
Doremi	1963		Originally called Prutske, as a multilingual magazine. Became the Dutch language Doremi in 1964. Had a circulation of over 100,000 by 1967
Doremi	1963		French version of the magazine for children between 3 and 6. Circulation of over 40,000 by 1967
Top	1973	1995	Magazine for 12 to 15 years old. Circulation increased from an initial 40,000 to 100,000 in 1981, to drop down again from then on
Dopido	1991		For 3 to 4 years old, a spin-off from Doremi
ID	1995		Replaced Top.

=== Books ===
Averbode has two major ranges of books, youth publications and religious publications.

While occasionally, books were published from about 1900 on, the first serious effort started in 1921 with the Trekkersreeks, and in 1925 with the series Uit Verre Landen (From Faraway Countries), a series of over thirty books translated from German, mostly about missionaries. These series was quite successful, and was reprinted and expanded to over 40 books, some written especially for Averbode, after World War II.

Averbode published also a few classic Flemish youth books, with De Waanzinnige Kluizenaar (The Mad Hermit) by Karitas (pseudonym of Hans Happel) in 1931, reprinted 9 times until 1979, and Spoken op de Ruwe heide (Ghosts on the Rough Heath) by John Flanders in 1934, reprinted 7 times until 1993. The most successful translated book was Het Licht der Bergen (The Light of the Mountains) by F. X. Weiser, 9 times reprinted between 1934 and 1962. It was originally written in German.

Between 1945 and 1970, most youth books produced by Averbode were either reprints of prewar successes, collections of short stories from the magazines, or new editions of fairy tales. While often very nicely illustrated, they were soon out of date with post-war Belgium, and were often criticized in newspaper reviews. The major successes were simple books for beginning readers. Among the many writers are only a few names with a wider appeal, like the prolific John Flanders and Leopold Vermeiren, and classic Flemish writer Ernest Claes.

In the 1970s, Averbode tries to regain the contact with the elder readers, from 10 to 15 years, with new authors and new layouts. The Top-series, called after the magazine for 12 to 15 year olds, is the biggest success, both commercially and critically. A first success is De dinderen van de vrede by Guido Staes, winner of the Staatsprijs in 1972. But the real expansion happens mostly in the 1980s. Authors like Gerda Van Cleemput and René Swartenbroeckx become quite popular in Flanders. Averbode also publishes a lot of translated youth literature, mainly from English language authors like William Bell and Monica Hughes, and German language authors like Hans Brunner and Jo Pestum. The most popular of the Flemish authors is the young Bart Moeyaert, whose debut Duet met valse noten is reprinted 11 times in 15 years.

The success continues until well into the 1990s, but by 2000, Averbode refocuses on the magazines and educational publications, and the number of books greatly diminishes.

=== Comics ===
Altiora was one of the first publishers to bring comics in their magazines, and has printed many unpublished comics over the years. However, contrary to other publishers with more purely comic magazines like Dupuis (with Spirou magazine) and Le Lombard (with Tintin magazine), they had little success with the edition of comic albums, and produced only a limited number of those. The most successful was Rikske en Fikske by Gray, a juvenile series about a boy and his dog. Other series by authors like Jijé, Renaat Demoen, François Craenhals or Berck were more short-lived or limited to a single story. Altiora has published no comics since the 1970s.

=== Multimedia ===
In recent years, the company has branched out into multimedia publications, amongst others with CD-Roms with the imprint "Lascaux" (from 1992 on), and their websites KidCity and Explorian (from 2000 on).
