= François Craenhals =

Belgian cartoonist (1926–2004)

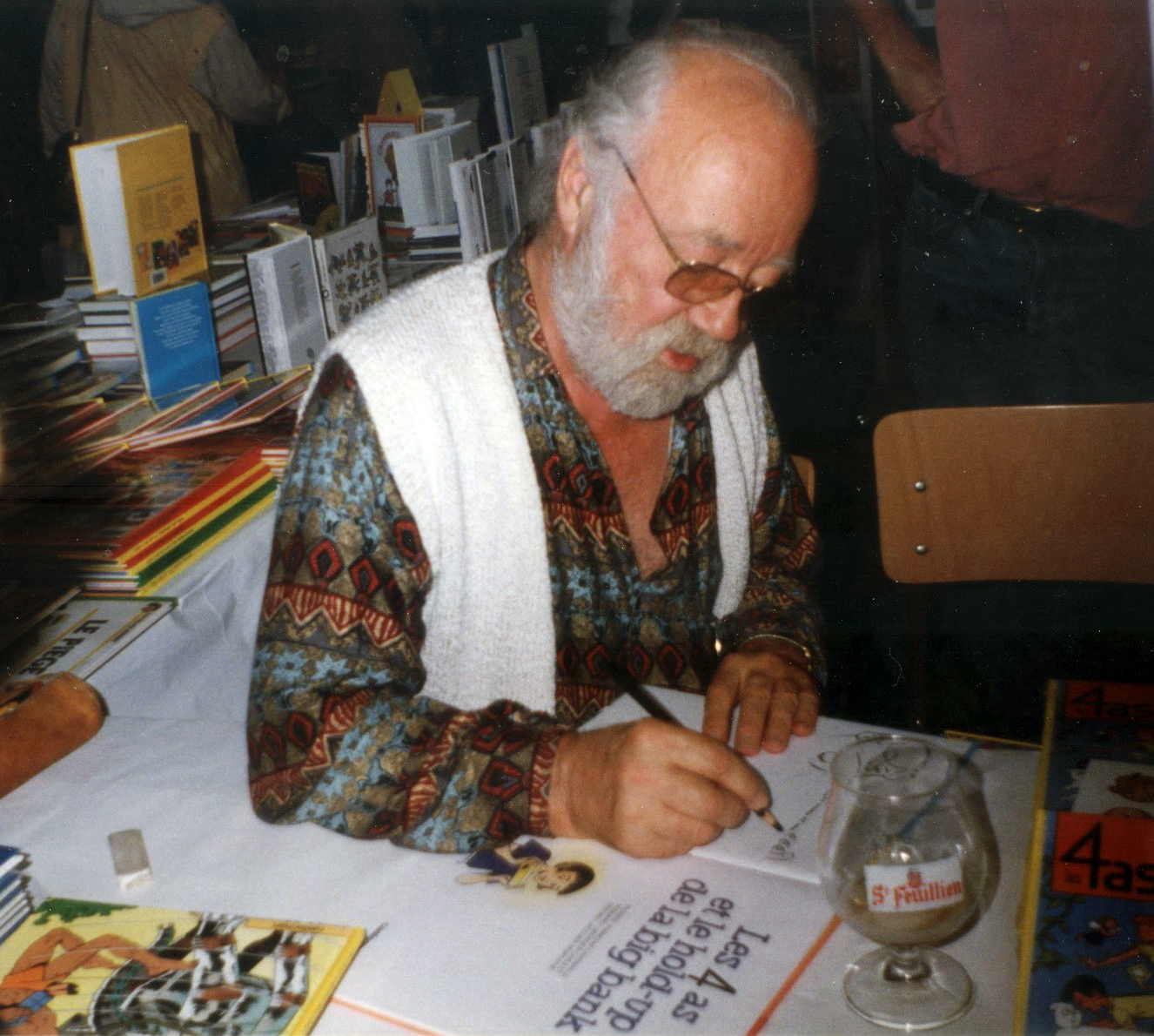
- Craenhals in 1993
- Born: 15 November 1926 Ixelles, Belgium
- Died: 2 August 2004 (aged 77) Montpellier, France
- Areas: Artist, writer
- Pseudonyms: F. Hal, Clopp
- Notable works: Fantômette; Chevalier Ardent; Les 4 As; Pom et Teddy

Signature
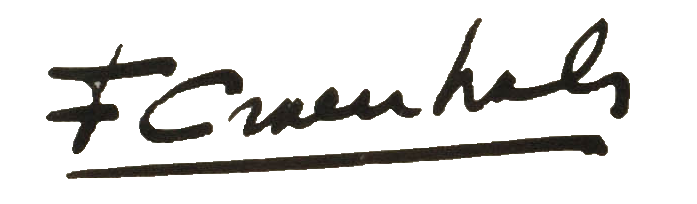

François Craenhals (15 November 1926 – 2 August 2004) was a Belgian comics artist best known for the comic series Chevalier Ardent and Les 4 As.

== Biography ==
François Craenhals was born in Ixelles in 1926. He was a fan of American comics by Alex Raymond and Hal Foster, and created his first comic Karan in the vein of Tarzan at the end of the 1940s. For the weekly magazine Le Soir Illustré, he made at the same time a medieval comic about a knight.

When he presented these comics to Tintin magazine, he was accepted as art director and gradually started making short comics for the magazine. His first main series debuted in 1953: Pom et Teddy was a series about a boy and a girl and their pet donkey, and the first stories were gentle stories about a circus.

Craenhals soon became one of the main producers of comics for magazines and newspapers, and a number of collaborators joined his studio. He worked for the Averbode magazine Petits Belges, and published for many years Primus et Musette in La Libre Belgique. He was one of the first comics artists to join Hergé at the editor Casterman, where his two main series were published: the juvenile Les 4 As about a band of four youngsters (three boys and a girl) and their over-the-top adventures; and the more adult, Prince Valiant-inspired Chevalier Ardent (The Brave Knight), about a young knight in the Middle Ages. Both series were reasonable good selling series, and the latter was a critical success as well.

In the 1990s, Craenhals moved to Rivières-de-Theyrargues in the south of France, where he continued drawing his two series until his death in 2004 in Montpellier.

== Bibliography ==
Series	Years	Volumes	Editor	Remarks
Rémy et Ghislaine	1955	2	Le Lombard	
Pom et Teddy	1956-1980	11	Le Lombard, Dargaud, Samedi-Jeunesse and Rijperman	
Sensations à Lourdes	1958	1	Altiora Averbode	
Primus et Musette	1961-1973	27	La Libre Belgique and La Cité	
Aventure à Sarajevo	1962	1	Le Lombard and Dargaud	
Les 4 As	1964-2004	41	Casterman	Additional artwork by J. Debruyne
Chevalier Ardent	1970-2001	20	Casterman	
Fantômette	1982-1984	4	Hachette	Story by Georges Chaulet
Mystère de l'An...	1989-1995	2	Harambee	Story by R. Dardenne
Un drame dans six coeurs	1995	1	Harambee	Story by R. Dardenne
Une lumière dans la nuit	1995	1	Harambee	Story by R. Dardenne

His comics have been translated in many languages, including Dutch, German and Swedish.

== Awards ==
- 1976: Best Story at the Prix Saint-Michel, Belgium

== Sources ==
- Béra, Michel; Denni, Michel; and Mellot, Philippe (1998): "Trésors de la Bande Dessinée 1999–2000". Paris, Les éditions de l'amateur. ISBN 2-85917-258-0
