= Averbode Abbey =

Premonstratensian abbey in Scherpenheuvel-Zichem, Flemish Brabant, Belgium

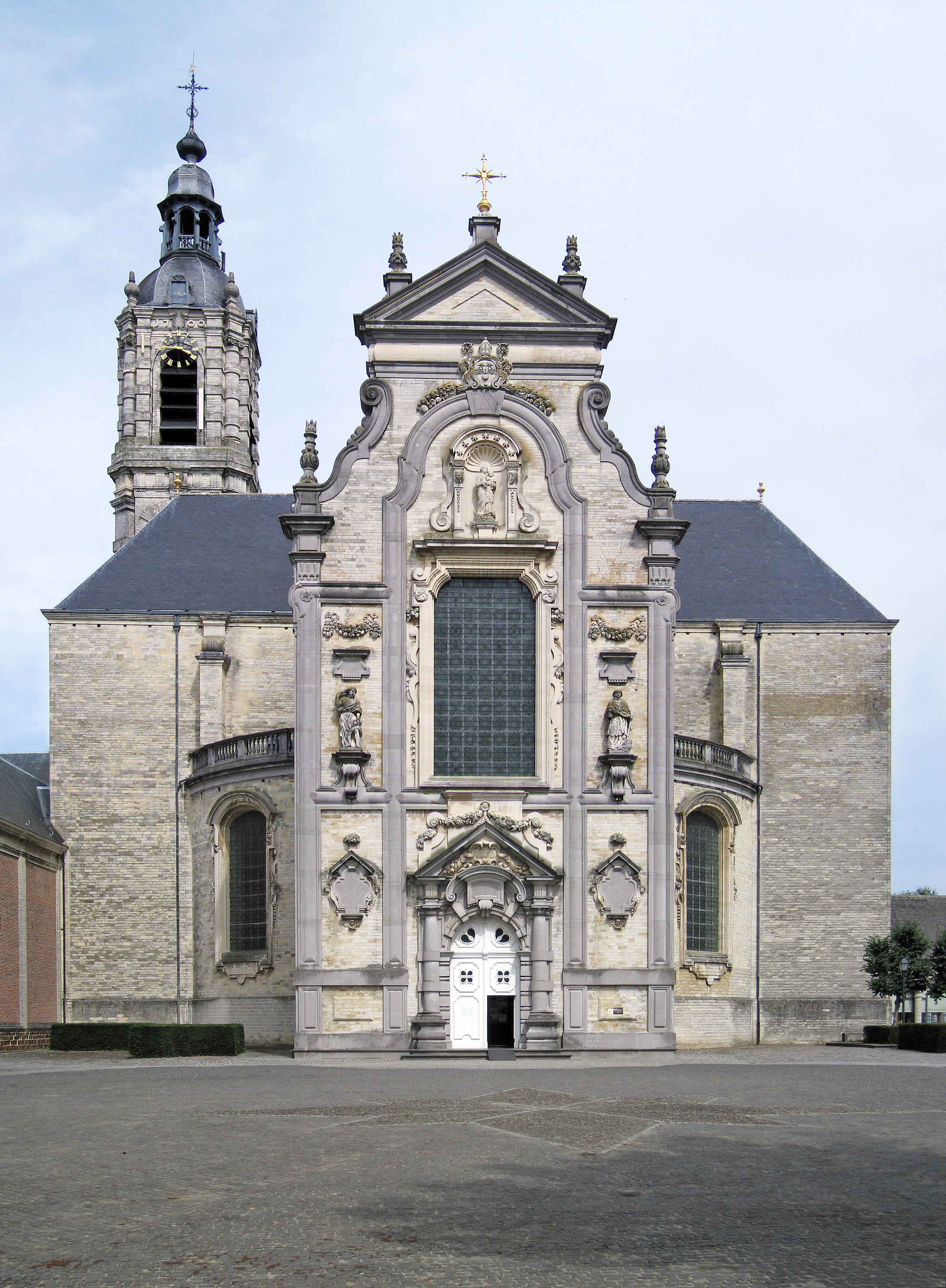
- Entrance of the Baroque church, finished in 1672
- Averbode Abbey
- 51.0333°N 4.9797°E
- Location: Scherpenheuvel-Zichem, Flemish Brabant
- Country: Belgium
- Denomination: Premonstratensian

History
- Founded: About 1134–1135

Architecture
- Architect: Jan Van den Eynde II
- Style: Baroque; Gothic; Renaissance
- Years built: 1664-1672
- Groundbreaking: 31 July 1664
- Completed: 11 July 1672

Administration
- Archdiocese: Mechelen-Brussels

Averbode Abbey is a Premonstratensian abbey situated in Averbode, in the municipality Scherpenheuvel-Zichem (Flemish Brabant), in the Archdiocese of Mechelen-Brussels in Belgium. It was founded about 1134, suppressed in 1797, and reestablished in 1834. Throughout the 20th century the abbey press was a leading children's publisher in Belgium. The church's building is a peculiar synthesis of Baroque and Gothic, with Renaissance ornament details, dominating the monastery complex. The whole structure was built of iron sandstone from Langdorp and white sandstone from Gobertange between 1664 and 1672, after a design by the Antwerp architect Jan Van den Eynde II.

== History ==
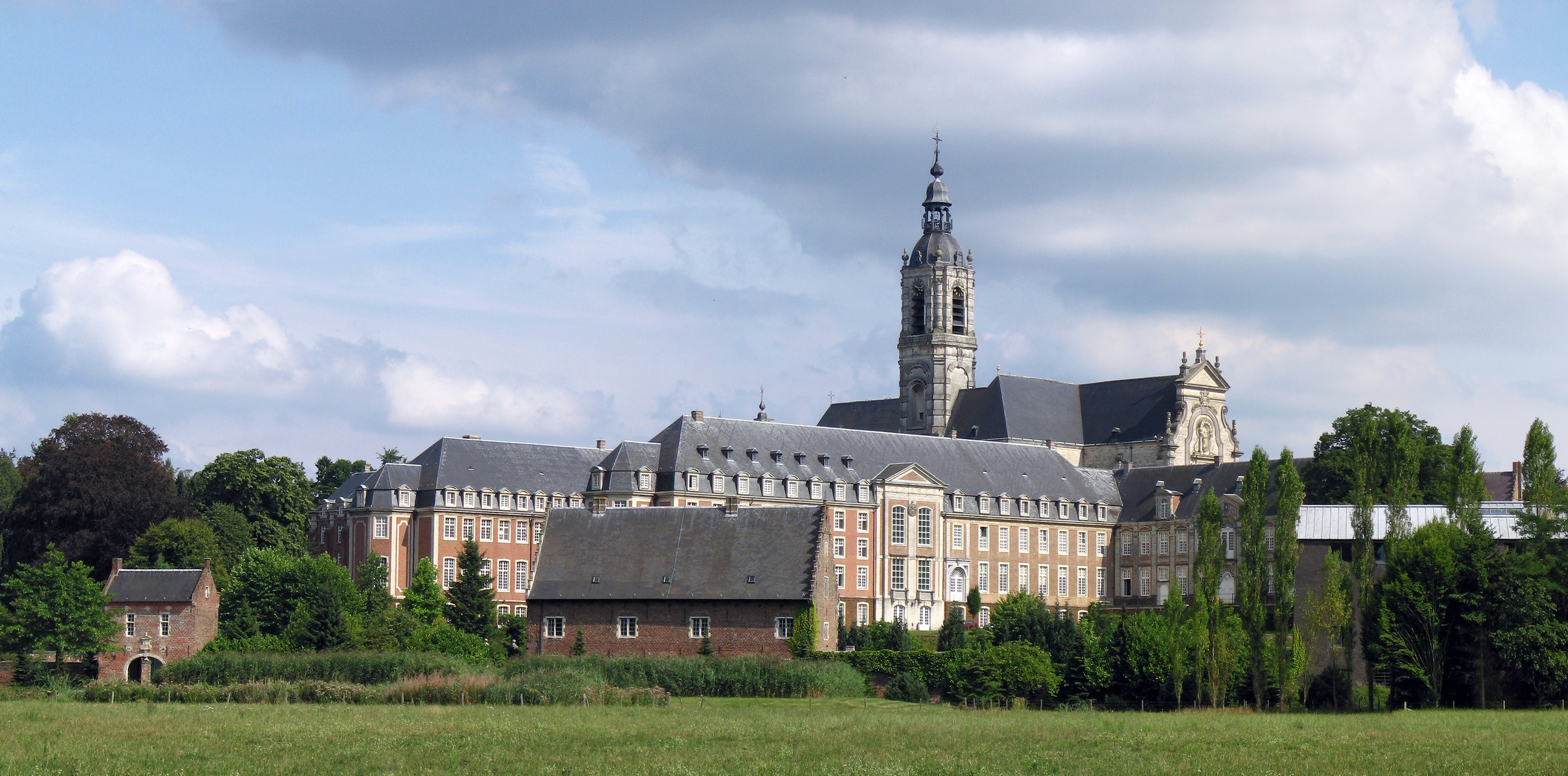
Averbode Abbey

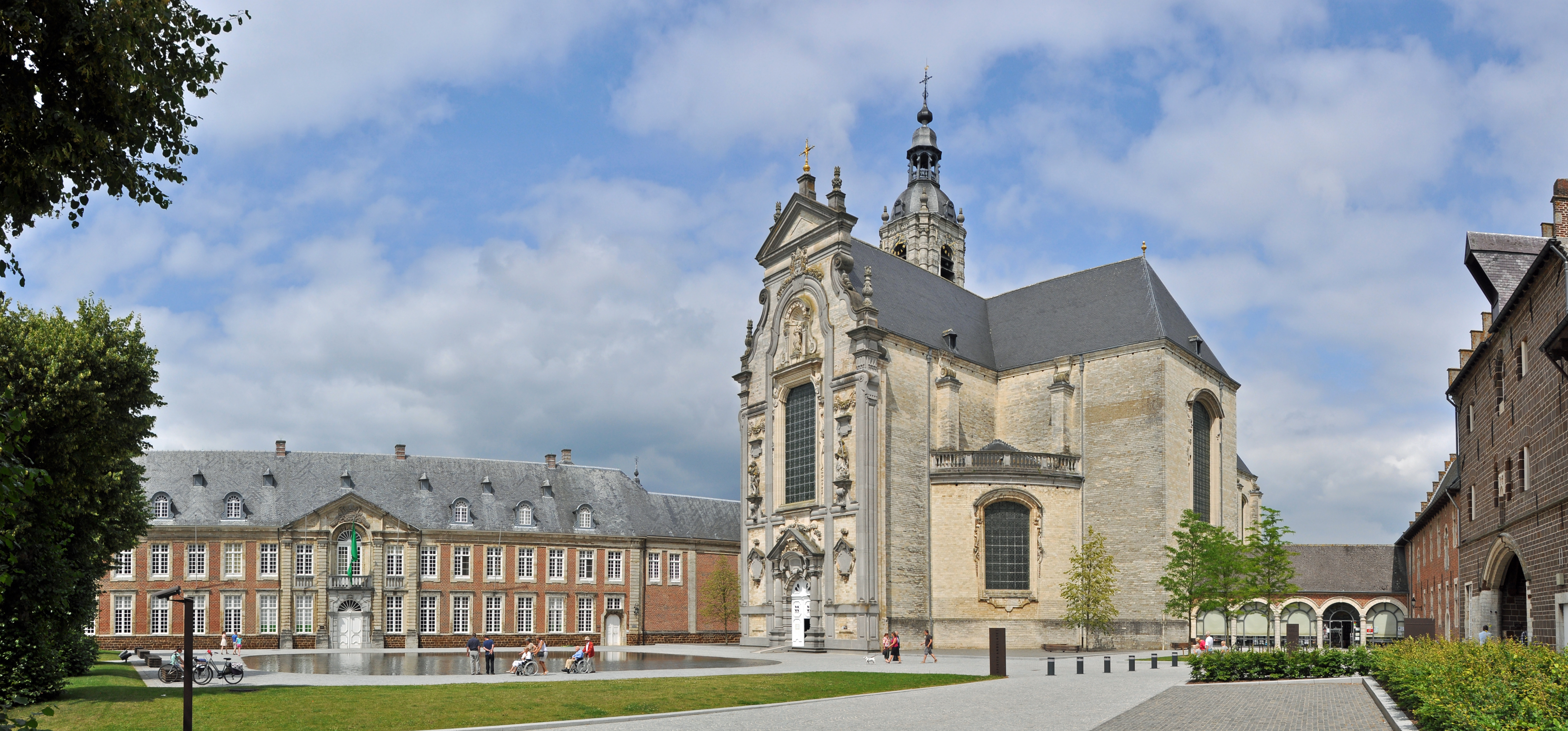
Averbode Abbey: the abbot's house (left) and the church (centre)

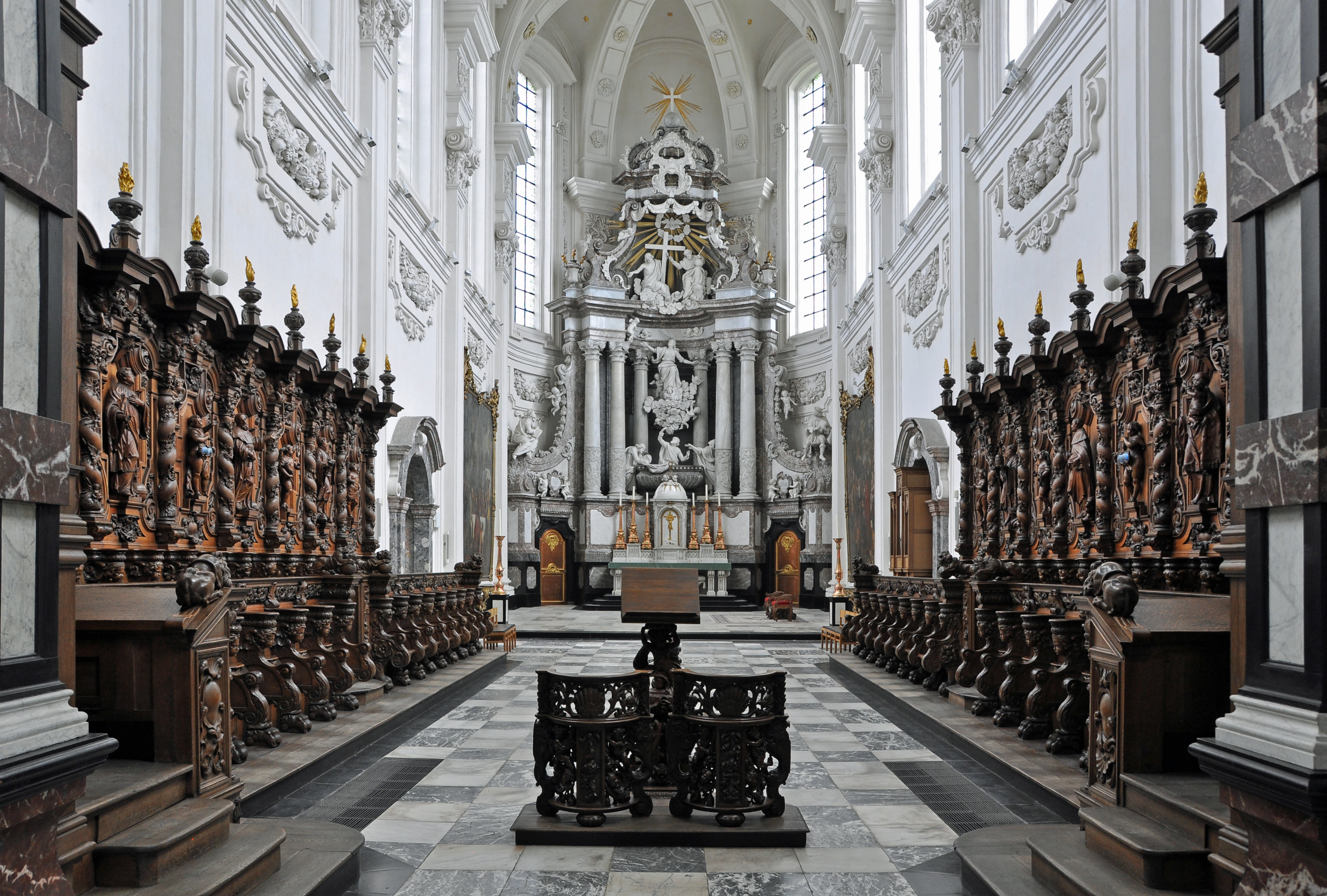
Chancel of the church

=== 1134–1800 ===
Averbode Abbey was founded about 1134–1135 by Arnold II, Count of Loon. With land donations from the Abbey of Sint-Truiden, the lords of Aarschot and Diest, and some years later Godfrey III of Leuven, the abbey was situated right on the border of the County of Loon and the Duchy of Brabant. The first canons and abbot Andreas came from the Sint-Michielsabdij in Antwerp, founded in 1124.

The abbey started rather small but grew over the centuries, until it was some 5500 ha in the seventeenth century, including farms, fields, woodland, mills, heath, and local chapels. The abbey also provided the priests for 27 parishes. The first abbey church was inaugurated in 1194, and soon after the nuns, who until then resided in Averbode as well, moved to Keizerbos, where it stayed until it disappeared in 1796.

The gatehouse, built at the end of the 14th century, is the oldest remaining building. The church and part of the abbey was destroyed by a fire after a lightning strike on 25 October 1499.

The abbey went through a prosperous period in the first half of the 16th century, under Abbot Gerard vander Schaeft. The church was rebuilt and richly decorated. Unrest and plundering troops made it necessary to flee the abbey four times in this period. Political and religious instability in the latter half of the century, with the Beeldenstorm, made the canons flee the abbey again in 1578 to the refuge of Diest. The death of 12 monks in 1579 because of the bubonic plague reduced the abbey to only 28 monks in 1584. They returned to Averbode only in 1604. The seventeenth century saw a return to strength of the abbey, with 80 monks by 1670.

At the end of the 18th century, in 1789, the Brabantse Omwenteling started a period of great political turmoil, with the French and the Austrians fighting for control over Brabant. Travelling troops heavily damaged the abbey. After the French disbanded most abbeys on 1 September 1796, the canons of Averbode were evicted on 14 February 1797. Most parts of the library and the archive, including the sumptuous Mosan masterpiece, the Evangeliary of Averbode, were brought to safety beforehand, and the abbot and some canons fled across the Rhine. In 1802, brother Ignatius Carleer bought the abbey and some monks were able to return. The church was used as parish church for Averbode (village). Because of financial problems, most of the church treasure had to be sold. Meanwhile, the library and archive were seized by the government and transferred to the University of Liège and the Royal Archives of Belgium in Brussels.

=== 1834–1918 ===
The abbey was reestablished on 14 December 1834, with the 12 surviving monks of 1796. Averbode also served as the novitiate for the abbeys of Postel, Grimbergen and Tongerlo. By 1840, there were again 23 people connected to the abbey, a figure which slowly rose to 31 in 1850 and 43 in 1868, of which only 19 actually stayed in the abbey. Most of the others where parish priests.

In 1877, the abbey founded a "Broederschap van O.-L.-Vrouw van het Heilig Hart" ("Brotherhood of Mother of the Sacred Heart"), linked with the Missionaries of the Sacred Heart of Issoudun. This brotherhood would give a new élan to the abbey and define its status and works until today. Membership soared, with 60,000 in 1879 and 100,000 in 1883, reaching 400,000 by 1894. In 1881, a first press was bought to print the magazines and leaflets for the Brotherhood. In the meantime, the judicial status of the abbey was still unclear, and in 1887 the abbey was sold to the Countess of Merode, and most of the ground to her father. In the years before World War I, the abbey prospered and grew through the Brotherhood and the printing activities, with some of its magazines printed in more than 100,000 copies. The abbey was now the largest employer of the region, and built social houses for its employees in 1899 and created a cooperative dairy in 1907 and a bank in 1911.

The abbey was at the time a motor of the village life, with also a school, a library and a thespian society. It was the center of Marian-centred pilgrimages, which attracted many visitors and benefited the local shops and bars.

In 1896, the abbey first started with missionary work, when two canons left for Pirapora, Brazil, where they started a school which also served as the seminary until 1949. Another school was started in Jaguarão in 1901, which was moved to Jaú in 1915. The college in Petropolis came under the leadership of Averbode in 1909 as well. A second mission started in 1903 in Denmark, where the abbey founded the parish of Vejle, with a new Catholic school and from 1913 on a hospital.

=== 1921 onwards ===
In 1921, the abbey was able to buy back its buildings and grounds from the family de Merode. The year before, the "Eucharistische Kruistocht" ("Eucharistic Crusade") was founded, a movement to bring the faithful more in line with the Church and its doctrines, in line with the teachings of Pope Pius X. The priest Edward Poppe, although not a member of the abbey, was the leading force behind the Crusade until his death in 1924 at the age of 34. New youth magazines were created as a means of spreading the Crusade amongst the youth, who were the main target of the movement. These would become the second main branch of the printing activities, together with the purely religious publications.

In the early 1930s, the abbey came into financial problems due to the high costs of new buildings for the abbey and machinery for the publishing company. A reorganisation, which made the publishing company a separate company owned by the abbey instead of an integral part of the abbey, and a strict financial control helped the abbey to pay off the debts over the next decade. On the other hand, the abbey flourished now more than ever. Because of the success of the Brotherhood, the Crusade and the missions, and the population explosion in Belgium, the numbers of canons increased to 230 by 1937.

The central buildings of the abbey, apart from the church, burned down almost to the ground on 29 December 1942. In 1945, a school in Brasschaat which was run by the abbey was hit by a V-1 flying bomb, killing a canon and three priests. The abbey reached its greatest population in 1959 with 242 people, 88 of which resided in the abbey. The others were divided over the missions, schools, dependencies and parishes maintained or serviced by Averbode. In the same year, a second Sint-Michielscollege was founded in Schoten, complementary to the one in Brasschaat. In Brazil, a new parish in Piracicaba was started, and an abbey was founded in Salto in 1963.

The general decline of Catholicism in Western Europe and especially in Flanders started to affect the abbey of Averbode as well though. The work on the new abbey in Brazil was stopped and the college of Jaú was closed down. The schools in Brasschaat and Schoten saw the canons leave as well, but they continued to exist. The publishing activities also were more and more led by laymen, and the printing activities were sold in 1996. In 2011, the abbey housed 78 canons, of which 45 lived and worked in the abbey.

== Abbey church ==
Between 1664 and 1672, a new church was built, after a design by the Flemish architect Jan van den Eynde II. Almost all the buildings were rebuilt during this century. Van den Eynde was awarded the commission in 1664, after Lucas Faydherbe’s plans were rejected. The first stone was laid on 31 July 1664. The ground-plan of this Baroque church combines a centralized cruciform space to the west for the laity with a deep choir, which was necessary for Norbertine choral services. The treatment of space is more emphatic here than in other Norbertine abbey churches, on account of the happy combination of a radial plan with a very long and axially accentuated choir. The design combined Gothic structural forms, such as ribbed vaults, with Renaissance ornamental details. The church is considered a peculiar synthesis of Baroque and Gothic. No dome was built over the central section because in January 1668 one of the major piers collapsed. Because two other pillars collapsed after that, the fourth pillar also had to be pulled down. Works restarted with more solid material and the building was roofed over by the end of 1670. The community inaugurated the new abbey church on 11 July 1672, the feast of St. Norbert. The solemn consecration was not celebrated until 19 June 1681. Van den Eynde also produced the church's sculptures.

== Present day ==
In 2010, the courtyard was redesigned to include a reflecting pool.

The abbey has a long tradition of the sustainable production of food and drink. Old service buildings were repurposed to house a abbeycafé with a brewery, a bakery and an abbey shop. The Abbey Cafe features a variety of products, including the house beer, Momentum, which is brewed on the premises. The Abbey Shop stocks products ranging from books to regional produce, including bread baked on site. The Abbey also has a dairy farm.

Zonneland is a Belgian Dutch-language youth magazine published by Averbode since 1920. A French version is called Tremplin.

== Mitred Prelates and Abbots ==
1. Andreas, died 1166.
2. Stephanus
3. Sibertus
4. Alexander
5. Aegeric
6. Godfried
7. Boudewijn
8. Robertus
9. John of Bossut.
10. Walthery of Wesemael.
11. Godfried of Tesselt.
12. John of Tieldonck.
13. Otto of Louvain.
14. John of Rotselaer.
15. John of Louvain.
16. Reinout of Aerschot.
17. Arnold of Venlo.
18. Henry of Winxele.
19. Arnold of Thulden.
20. John Vucht.
21. Daniel Laekmans.
22. Joannes Boudewijns, first Mitred prelate of Averbode, by pontifical right of Nicolas V, died in 1460.
23. Arnold van den Valgaet
24. Bartholomew van den Valgaet.
25. Gerald van der Schaeft.
26. Paul Gielemans.
27. Hyroniemus Fabry.
28. Matthew Foullon.
29. Egide Heiyns
30. Arnold van der Heiyden
31. Matthew Valentyns.
32. Niclaas Ambrosy
33. Servaas Vaes.
34. Stephen vander Steghen.
35. Frederic van Panhuysen.
36. Simon Brauxman.
37. Ghijsbert Halloint.
38. Adriaan Salle.
39. Mauritius Verboven.
40. Gregorius Thiels.

=== Abbots since the French Revolution ===
1. Gregorius Thiels.
2. Norbertus Dierckx.
3. Sulptitius de Sespes.
4. Frederic Mahieu.
5. Leopold Nelo, first mitred Abbot of Averbode.
6. Gummarus Crets (1887 tot 1942), general Abbot, papal prelate.
7. Emmanuel Gisquière
8. Koenraad Stappers
9. Ulrik Geniets
10. Jos Wouters

== See also ==
- Postel Abbey
