= Marie Marcks =

German artist and cartoonist (1922–2014)

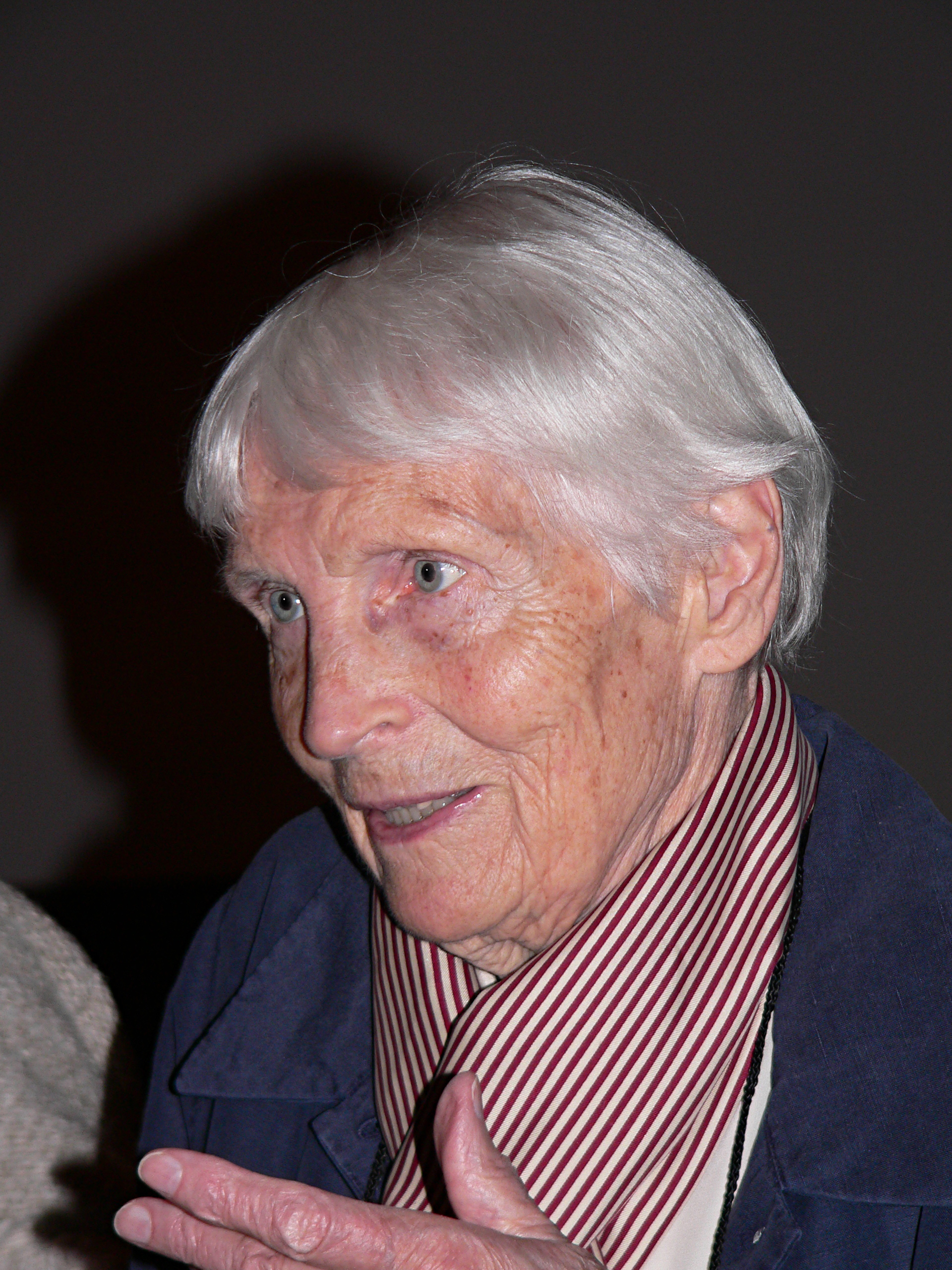
- Marcks in 2006
- Born: 25 August 1922; Berlin, Prussia, German Republic
- Died: 7 December 2014 (aged 92); Heidelberg, Baden-Württemberg, Germany
- Known for: Social and political caricatures
- Style: Caricature, cartoons, graphic novel

Marie Marcks (25 August 1922 – 7 December 2014) was a German graphic artist and cartoonist. She published numerous books, regular caricatures in widely circulated German publications as well as autobiographical graphic novels on everyday life. A well-known artist since the post-war years in the Federal Republic of Germany, she is considered among the most important caricaturists and has been called "the Grande Dame of political caricature in Germany".

== Life and career ==
Marcks grew up in Berlin, the daughter of an architect and a graphic designer, who ran a private art school. Her uncle was the sculptor Gerhard Marcks. Her early years were overshadowed by the Nazi regime and the Second World War. Like other young Germans, she had to join the Reich Labour Service, picking up potatoes at a farm and working in a plant for aircraft engines.

After attending secondary school at the reformist Birklehof boarding school in Hinterzarten (Black Forest) and training at her mother's art school, Marie Marcks studied architecture for a few semesters in Berlin and Stuttgart. Having abandoned her studies, Marcks worked as a freelance artist from 1945 onwards in Heidelberg.

In the late 1940s and 1950s, she created posters for student clubs and jazz bands, including for the US forces in Heidelberg. In 1958, she was commissioned to design the graphic design for the German participation at Expo 58, the world exhibition in Brussels.

In the 1960s, Marcks began creating caricatures. These were first published in the magazine atomzeitalter, where she worked as a permanent cartoonist from 1963 to 1966. Over time, she expanded her drawings to include social, political and feminist causes, with cartoons critical of the education system, nuclear power plants, gender inequality, abortion law and German public servants with a Nazi background, among other issues. She became one of the most important political caricaturists in the Federal Republic of Germany.

Marcks published more than 30 books and numerous caricatures in widely circulated publications. These included German newspapers and magazines, such as Stern, Der Spiegel and Vorwärts. For more than 20 years, she was a regular editorial cartoonist for the Süddeutsche Zeitung. Working for the satirical magazines Pardon and Titanic, Marcks collaborated with caricaturists of the New Frankfurt School, such as F. K. Waechter and Chlodwig Poth, with whom she shared a professional and artistic relationship. In terms of her stylistic influences, art historians have mentioned French caricaturists Jean-Marc Reiser and Jean-Jacques Sempé, as well as American cartoonist Saul Steinberg. Her work in turn was followed by younger German female cartoonists Franziska Becker and Katharina Greve.

In 1984 and 1989, her autobiographical graphic novels Marie, es brennt! and Schwarz-weiß und bunt were published in two volumes, with a total of over 300 pages. Her images, drawn in black-and-white or with coloured pencils, are often telling their message with additional speech balloons or captions. Richness of detail and ironical word play are typical characteristics of her style.

In her private life, Marcks raised five children as a single mother. She continued her work until shortly before she died, aged 92.

== Reception ==
On the occasion of the 100th anniversary of her birth, the German Historical Museum called Marcks the "Grande Dame of political caricature in the Federal Republic." Commenting on Marcks's work, the former President of the German Federal Constitutional Court, Jutta Limbach, said: "No artist before her has caricatured gender relations in such a sarcastic way." Further, she recognized how Marcks had frequently portrayed the "narrow-minded patriarch."

Her artistic estate of around 2,500 works was acquired in 2013 by the Wilhelm Busch Museum in Hanover, which organised a retrospective exhibition of the artist's work from May to October 2015. A two-volume edition of her work was published in 2022 to mark her 100th birthday. In Heidelberg, where she spent most of her life, the Marie-Marcks-School was named after her.

During her lifetime, Marcks was honoured with several awards, including the German Order of Merit in 1995, the 2004 Caricature Prize of the German Bar Association and the German Caricature Prize in 2008. Her work has been shown in numerous solo exhibitions, both during her lifetime and for her centenary anniversary at the Mark Twain Center for Transatlantic Relations in Heidelberg.

== Selected works ==
- Marie, es brennt! Frauenbuchverlag Weismann Verlag, München 1984, ISBN 3-88897-108-X.
- Sternstunden der Menschheit – von Marie Marcks. Karikaturen der letzten 50 Jahre. Edition Braus im Wachter Verlag, 2000, ISBN 3-926318-73-2.
- Hast du jetzt den Überblick? Verlag Antje Kunstmann, München 2002, ISBN 3-88897-316-3.
- Niemand welkt so schön wie du! Verlag Antje Kunstmann, München 2005, ISBN 3-88897-409-7.
- Meister der komischen Kunst: Marie Marcks. Antje Kunstmann, Munich 2011, ISBN 978-3-88897-717-6.
- Nichts gegen Männer … Karikaturen und Zeichnungen von Marie Marcks. Catalogue for the exhibition at the Wilhelm Busch Museum, Hannover, 2015.
- Die große Marie Marcks. Zweibändige Werkausgabe. Antje Kunstmann, Munich 2022, ISBN 978-3-95614-520-9.

== See also ==
- Caricatura Museum Frankfurt
- German comics

== Literature ==
- Thomas Werner (ed.) (2000): Sternstunden der Menschheit – von Marie Marcks. Karikaturen der letzten 50 Jahre. Anlässlich einer Ausstellung im Kurpfälzischen Museum der Stadt Heidelberg. Wachter Verlag, ISBN 3-926318-73-2, pp. 273–275.
- Michael Buselmeier (ed.) (2000): Erlebte Geschichte erzählt 1994–1997. Das Wunderhorn, Heidelberg, ISBN 3-88423-175-8, pp. 221–235.
- Kotthoff, Helga (2000). "Gender and joking: On the complexities of women's image politics in humorous narratives". Journal of Pragmatics. 32 (1): 55–80. doi:10.1016/S0378-2166(99)00031-4. ISSN 0378-2166.
- Fraser, Catherine C.; Hoffman, Dierk O. (2006). Pop Culture Germany!: Media, Arts, and Lifestyle. Bloomsbury Publishing USA. pp. 39, 119, 120. ISBN 978-1-85109-738-8.
- W. P. Fahrenberg (ed.) (2011): Meister der komischen Kunst: Marie Marcks. Antje Kunstmann, Munich, ISBN 978-3-88897-717-6, pp. 105–110.
- Kesper-Biermann, Sylvia (2023). "Between Sex Revolt and 'Relationship Stuff': Gender Relations in Comics of the 1968 Generation". In Lucenti, Maria (ed.). Women in Formal and Informal Education. Brill. pp. 112–132. ISBN 978-90-04-52569-6.
