= Caricatura Museum Frankfurt =

German museum for comic art

Coordinates: 50°06′36″N 8°41′07″E

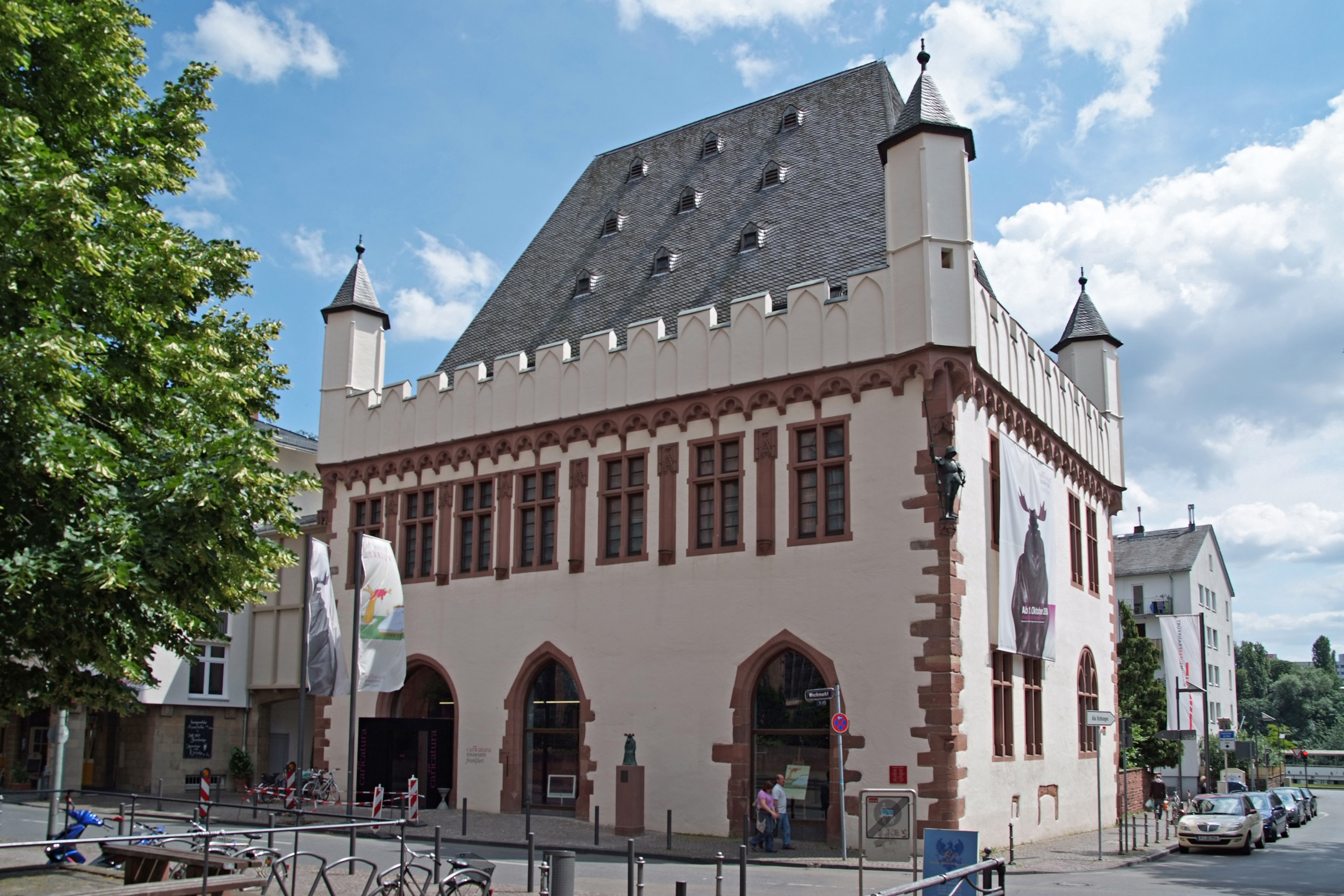
The Museum in the Leinwandhaus

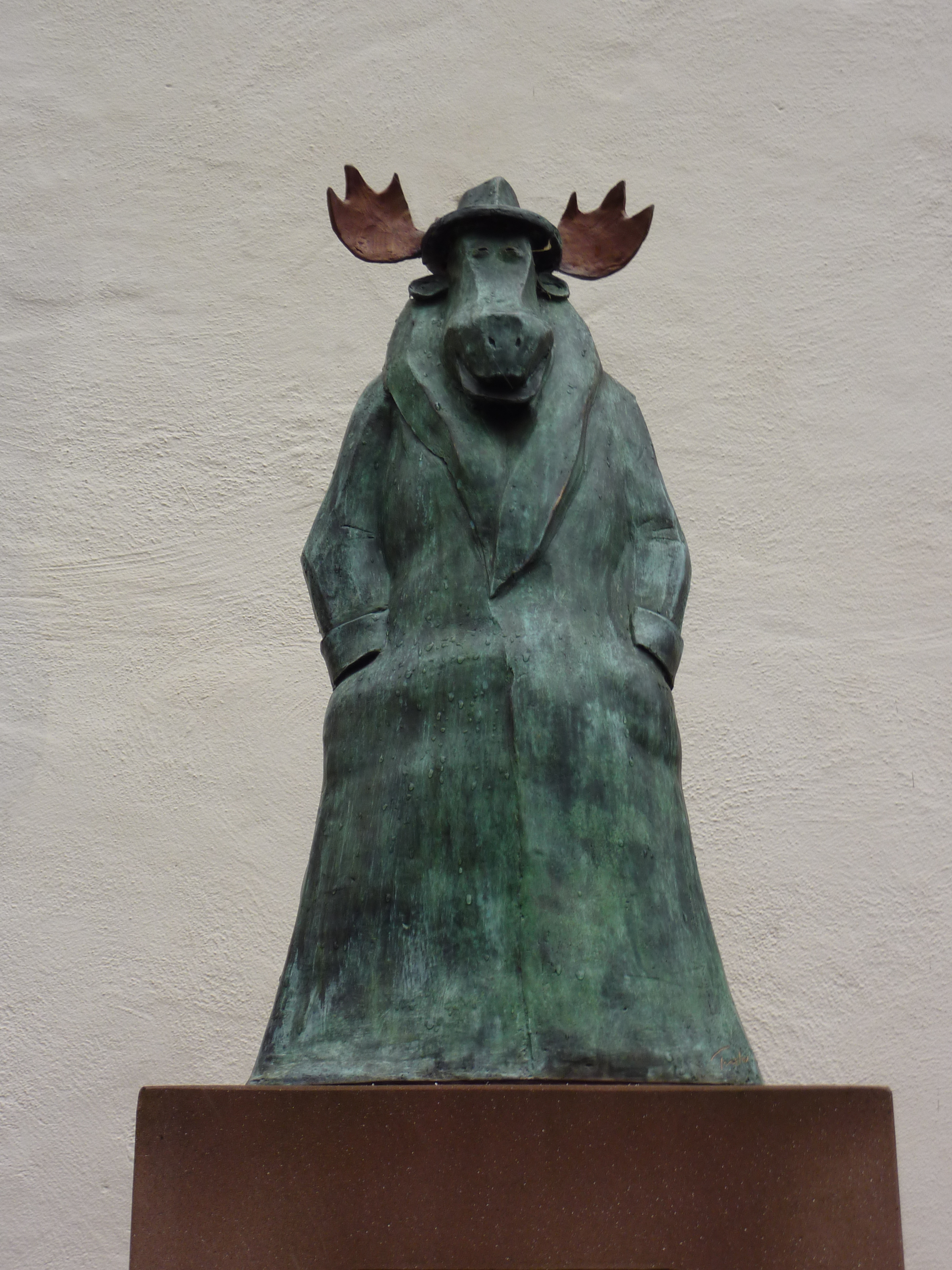
Elch, sculpture by Hans Traxler

The Caricatura Museum, official name Caricatura Museum für Komische Kunst, is a museum for comic art in Frankfurt, Hesse, Germany. It shows a in a permanent exhibition works by the artists of the Neue Frankfurter Schule, and additionally exhibitions of contemporary artists. It is part of Frankfurt's Museumsufer (Museum Riverbank).

== History ==
In 2000, a group called Caricatura of the Historical Museum, Frankfurt, began to prepare a museum for comic art in Frankfurt. The Caricatura Museum was opened on 1 October 2008 in the Leinwandhaus in the Altstadt. The permanent exhibition shows works by F. W. Bernstein, Robert Gernhardt, Chlodwig Poth, Hans Traxler, and F. K. Waechter, including literary works and films. It is complemented by readings, book presentations and other events.

The trade mark of the museum is a bronze sculpture in front of the building by Hans Traxler. The Elch sculpture carries the names of the eight most important representatives of the Neue Frankfurter Schule, and a two-line poem by F. W. Bernstein, "Die schärfsten Kritiker der Elche / waren früher selber welche" ("The harshest critics of the moose / used themselves to be some").

== Former temporary exhibitions ==
2008

- Bernd Pfarr – Komische Welten (2 October 2008 – 11 January 2009)

2009

- Greser & Lenz – Hurra, die Krise ist vorbei (29 January – 26 April 2009)
- Hans Traxler – Löhleins Katze (7 May – 26 July 2009)
- ATAK (Georg Barber) and Fil (Philip Tägert) – Superpeter – Struwwelpeter Superheld (6 August – 20 September 2009)
- Titanic – das Erstbeste aus 30 Jahren (3 October 2009 – 31 January 2010)

2010

- Chlodwig Poth – Poth für die Welt (11 February – 25 April 2010)
- Franziska Becker – Letzte Warnung (27 May – 19 September 2010)
- Guido Sieber and Franz Dobler — Die Geschichte der Populären Musik (30 September 2010 – 30 January 2011)

2011

- Jean-Marc Reiser – Vive Reiser! (10 February – 26 June 2011)
- Haderer (7 July – 27 November 2011)
- Tomi Ungerer – Satiricon (8 December 2011 – 18 March 2012)

2012

- Nikolaus Heidelbach – Wurst, Wein, Weihnachten, Wild und Gemüse (29 March – 29 July 2012)
- Marie Marcks (9 August – 11 November 2012)
- Caricatura VI – Die Komische Kunst (22 November 2012 – 3 March 2013)

2013

- F. W. Bernstein – Zeichenzausels Werkschau (14 March – 7 July 2013)
- Rattelschneck – Lachsack statt Airbag (18 July – 3 November 2013)
- Sowa Hurzlmeier Kahl - Weltfremde Malerei (14 November 2013 – 16 March 2014)

2014

- Ralf König – Paul vs. Paulus (27 March – 3 August 2014)
- Kurt Halbritter (14 August – 16 November 2014)
- Kamagurka – How to become a German. Die Deutschwerdung des Kamagurka (27 November 2014 – 22 March 2015)

2015

- Gerhard Glück – Auch das noch! (2 April – 13 September 2015)
- Gerhard Seyfried (27 September 2015 – 24 January 2016)

2016

- Detlef Beck (11 February – 12 June 2016)
- Sebastian Krüger (30 June – 30 October 2016)
- Stern-Humor (10 November 2016 – 12 March 2017)

2017

- Ari Plikat (23 March – 23 July 2017)
- Frank Hoppmann (3 August – 3 December 2017)
- Robert Gernhardt (15 December – 15 April 2018)

2018

- Otto – Die Ausstellung (25 April – 2 September 2018)
- Volker Kriegel – (13 September 2018 – 20 January 2019)

2019

- Ernst Kahl (7 February – 12 May 2019)

2023

- Loriot
