= Manifest für Frieden =

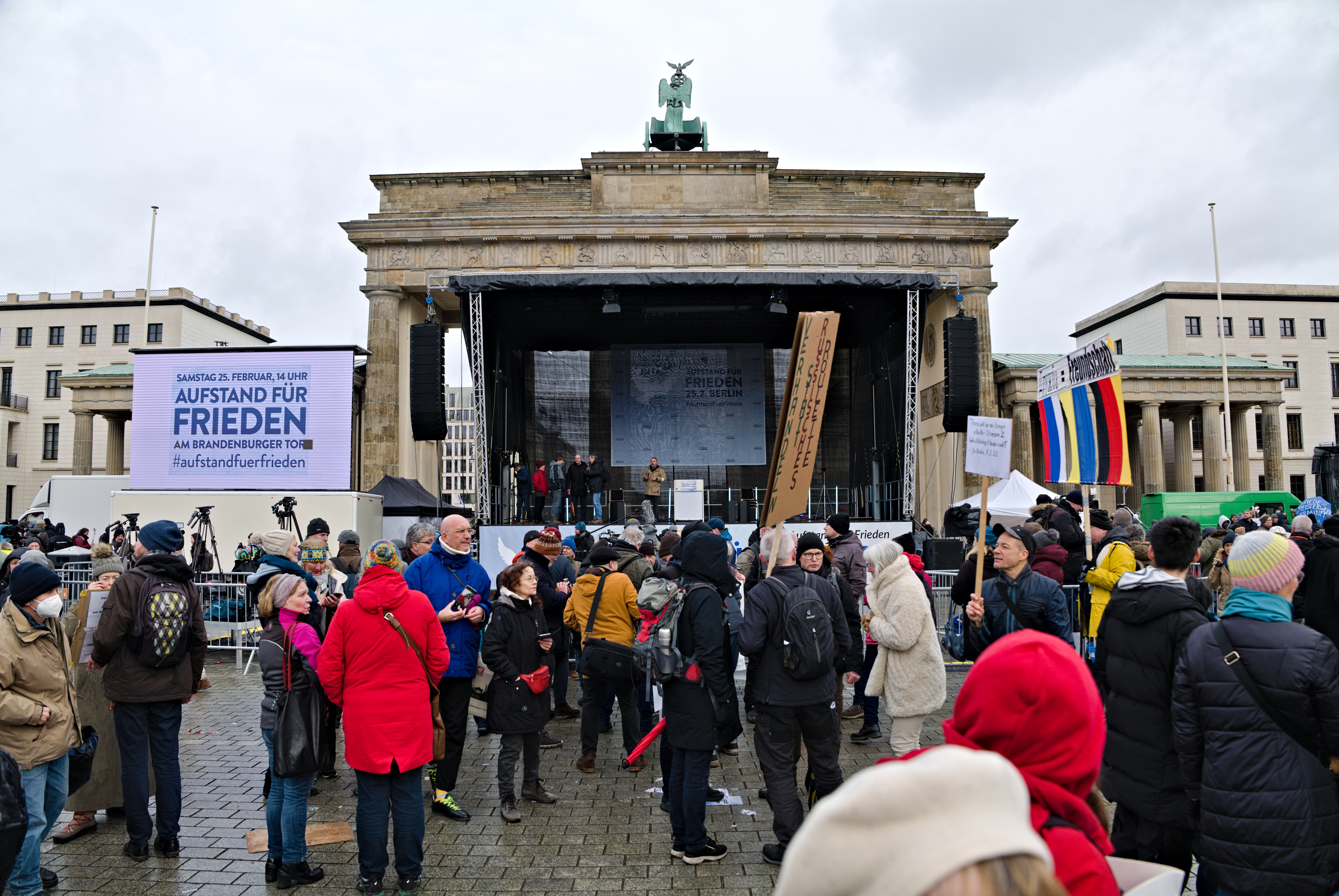
Aufstand für Frieden demonstration in Berlin, 25 February 2023

The Manifest für Frieden (lit. 'Manifesto for peace') is a German manifesto and an online petition against Germany's arms deliveries to Ukraine and in favour of peace negotiations in the Russo-Ukrainian war.

== Background ==
Directed to the Chancellor Olaf Scholz, it was written by Sahra Wagenknecht, a politician for the German party BSW, and Alice Schwarzer, publisher of the feminist magazine EMMA, and launched on 10 February 2023.

The petition quickly reached several hundred thousand signatures, was accompanied by the demonstration Aufstand für Frieden that drew around 13,000 people to the Brandenburg Gate on 25 February 2023, and caused intense debate in the German media. People from mainstream media and political parties accused Wagenknecht and Schwarzer of repeating Russian propaganda, and of not sufficiently disavowing right-wing populists who also oppose the arms deliveries.

== Signatories ==
=== Initial 69 signatories ===
- Franz Alt, journalist
- Bigi Alt
- Christian Baron, author
- Franziska Becker, cartoonist
- Thilo Bode, founder of Foodwatch
- Peter Brandt, historian
- Reiner Braun, of the International Peace Bureau
- Andrea Breth, director
- Ulrich Brinkmann, sociologist
- Christoph Butterwegge, poverty researcher
- Angelika Claußen, Vice-President of IPPNW Europe
- Daniela Dahn, author
- Rudolf Dreßler, former Secretary of State (SPD)
- Eugen Drewermann, theologian
- Anna Dünnebier, author
- Petra Erler, former politician
- Valie Export, artist
- Bettina Flitner, photographer and author
- Justus Frantz, conductor and pianist
- Holger Friedrich, publisher of Berliner Zeitung
- Katharina Fritsch, artist
- Hajo Funke, political scientist
- Peter Gauweiler, politician and lawyer
- Jürgen Grässlin, director of the German Peace Society
- Wolfgang Grupp, entrepreneur
- Ulrike Guérot, political scientist
- Gottfried Helnwein, artist
- Hannelore Hippe, author
- Henry Hübchen, actor
- Wolfgang Hummel, jurist
- Otto Jäckel, chairman of the IALANA
- Dirk Jörke, political scientist
- Margot Käßmann, theologian
- Corinna Kirchhoff, actress
- Uwe Kockisch, actor
- Matthias Kreck, mathematician
- Oskar Lafontaine, former Minister of Finance and leader of the SPD
- Detlef Malchow, businessman
- Gisela Marx, journalist
- Rainer Mausfeld, psychologist
- Roland May, director
- Maria Mesrian, theologian
- Reinhard Mey, musician
- Hella Mey
- Klaus Moegling, political scientist
- Michael Müller, chairman of Naturfreunde
- Franz Nadler, chairman of Connection e.V.
- Christof Ostheimer, chairman of ver.di Neumünster
- Tanja Paulitz, sociologist
- Romani Rose, chairman of the Central Council of German Sinti and Roma
- Eugen Ruge, author
- Helke Sander, filmmaker
- Michael von der Schulenburg, former United Nations diplomat
- Hanna Schygulla, actress
- Martin Sonneborn, journalist and leader of Die PARTEI
- Jutta Speidel, actress
- Hans-Christof von Sponeck, former United Nations Assistant Secretary-General
- Wolfgang Streeck, sociologist
- Katharina Thalbach, actress
- Jürgen Todenhöfer, politician
- Gerhard Trabert, professor of social medicine
- Bernhard Trautvetter, of the Friedensratschlag
- Erich Vad, retired Brigadier General
- Johannes Varwick, political scientist
- Günter Verheugen, former European Commissioner
- Antje Vollmer, theologian and politician
- Peter Weibel, artist and art and media theorist
- Nathalie Weidenfeld, author
- Hans-Eckardt Wenzel, songwriter
- Theodor Ziegler, religious educator
