= Wilhelm Busch Prize =

German poetry award

The Wilhelm Busch Prize is an biennial poetry award for 10,000 €, for humorous and satirical verse, administered by the Schaumburger Landschaft, named after Wilhelm Busch. An additional award by the organization is the Hans Huckebein Prize, former Wilhelm-Busch-Förderpreis.

== Recipients ==
- 2006 Robert Gernhardt
- 2007 Vicco von Bülow, "Loriot"
- 2008 F. W. Bernstein
- 2011 Ernst Kahl
- 2013 Franziska Becker
- 2015 Hans Traxler
- 2017 Ralf König
- 2019 Isabel Kreitz
- 2021 Markus Witzel alias Mawil
- 2024 Hilke Raddatz

== Hans Huckebein Prize ==
former Wilhelm-Busch-Förderpreis

Year	1st Prize	Title	2nd Prize	Title	3rd Prize	Title	4th Prize	Title
2019	Volker Henning	"Mäusehochzeit"	Dieter Brandl	"Das Match"				
2017	Dieter Brandl	"Die Beratung"	Werner Schwuchow	"Der Schlaf"				
2015	Roland Kielmann	"Sterben, erben, Spaß verderben"	Volker Henning, Reiner Koch, Arno Meiser	"Betriebsweihnachtsfeier", "Bart", "Stundentakt"				
2013	Volker Henning, Dieter Brandl	"Die Buchlesung", "Die Cuvée"						
2011	Barbara Bürger	"Gruß aus der Gerüchteküche"	Antje Mesdag	"Der Popel"	Fritz Hans Rückel	"Tortengeflüster"		
2008	Christian Maintz		Christian Mahnke					
2007	Gerhard Seyfried	"Proofreading"	Bruno Wendt	"Growth"	Lena Krochmann	"Snowball fight"		
2006	Dirk Nachtigall	"The spotted hyena"	Helmut Opitz	"Flashlights"				
2005	Rune Becker	"The reading"	Christian Maintz	"For the love lives of animals: Today the Boar"	Peter Düker	"Separation of luck, Is it you?"		
2004	Alex Dreppec	"My biology teacher and his lichen"	Bernd Penners	"How it really was, back in Mariapfarr Lungau ..."	Peter Düker	"Whenever I go to sleep and other"	Dieter Schweimler	"The Züngelmann"
2003	Bettina Hoffmann-Günster	"At sea, roses, the salts"	Ody (Gregor Köhne)	"Bolero "	Jörg-Martin Willnauer	"The Gordian Bart and others "	Dietrich Hucke	"Warning to a horn player who breaks out in Africa"
2002	Christian Maintz	"An experience of Goethe and The Frog Pond"	Ody (Gregor Köhne)	"Bullfighting and Luise"	Maik Altenburg	"Sales talk "		
2001	Ody (Gregor Köhne)	"The Yorkie trilogy"	Manfred Brinkmann	"Ode to the solid foundation of Liedertafel"	Jürgen Lux	"The midlife crisis "	Reiner Koch	"Art Enjoyment"
2000	Jörg Borgerding	"Jesus and I - or how I nearly saved the world and had breakfast with Robert G. "	Klaus Schafmeister	"Lyricist nightmare "	Josef Kuhn	"O mutatio temporum, including image-Care "	Melitta Kessaris	"Unsuccessful Love's Labors"
1999	Jürgen Lux	"The zero-diet"	Gisela Walitzek-Platten	"Rogue Strings "	Inge Methfessel	" In addition to line (or: Why we are not descended from Neanderthals) "	Marlies Kalbhenn	"Helene 1999"
1998	Hermann Leibbrand	"On to the Caribbean! "	Karsten Kretschmann	"Insurance agent"	Fritz-Hans Rückel	"The successful soul therapy"	Klaus Schafmeister	"second attempt!"
1997	Alfred Paul Schubert	"Jan Bliefnich, prevented the Vicar"	Friedhelm Kändler	"Chapter: The Scream (from: Kröhlmann)"	Günter Nehm	"letter to his old friend Balduin"	Michael Schalich	"The pious Helene"
