= Robert Gernhardt =

German painter

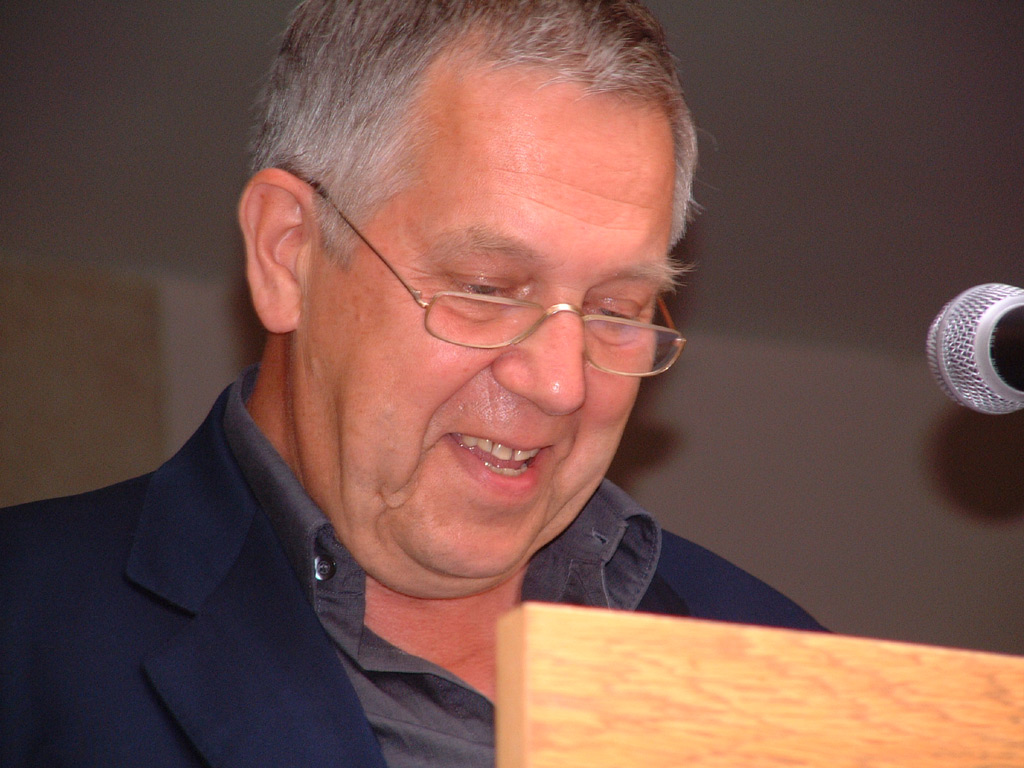
- Born: 13 December 1937; Tallinn, Estonia
- Died: 30 June 2006 (aged 68); Frankfurt am Main, Germany
- Occupations: poet, cartoonist, short story writer
- Writing career
- Notable works: Wörtersee, Herz in Not, Kippfigur

Robert Gernhardt (13 December 1937 – 30 June 2006) was a German writer, painter, graphic artist and poet.

== Life ==
Robert Gernhardt was born the son of a judge and a chemist in Tallinn, where his family was part of the Baltic German minority. In 1939 they had to relocate to Poznań. In 1945 his father was killed in the war, and after the end of the war, his mother fled west with her three sons Robert, Per, and Andreas, finally ending up in Göttingen, where Robert Gernhardt finished school in 1956.

Afterwards, he studied painting, first in Stuttgart and then at the Hochschule der Künste in Berlin, also doing German Studies at Berlin's Freie Universität.

Beginning in 1964, he lived in Frankfurt, working as a freelance artist and writer. In 1965 he married his first wife, Almut Gernhardt, née Ulrich, who died in 1989. In 1990 he married his second wife, Almut Gehebe.

Since purchasing a house in Tuscany in 1972, he regularly spent many months in Italy.

In 1996 he had to undergo a multiple bypass operation and, in 2002, he was diagnosed with Colorectal cancer, which he succumbed to in 2006.

== Work ==
Robert Gernhardt was a regular contributor to the satirical magazine pardon, where he edited the section Welt im Spiegel ("World in the Mirror") with F. K. Waechter and F. W. Bernstein, using the pseudonym Lützel Jeman until 1971.

Gernhardt co-founded the satirical magazine Titanic in 1979. He was a member of the so-called Neue Frankfurter Schule (New Frankfurt School) together with artists like Waechter, Chlodwig Poth, and Hans Traxler. Gernhardt's satirical style combines social critique with a self-consciously irreverential attitude to cultural and literary traditions.

His poetry and prose are situated within the comic traditions of Wilhelm Busch, Christian Morgenstern and the urban poetry of Heinrich Heine and Bertolt Brecht. Gernhardt's poems, which frequently produce their comic effects through play with language and sound as well as through playfully quoting literary tradition, have become part of public consciousness in Germany.

During the '70s and '80s, he wrote material for Otto Waalkes, one of Germany's most popular comedians. A lot of Waalkes' most famous routines were written by Gernhardt, often in collaboration with Peter Knorr and Bernd Eilert.

In 2006, shortly before his death, he was the Writer in Residence at the German department of the University of Warwick.

He died on 30 June 2006 in Frankfurt am Main, after a long fight against cancer, aged 68.

In 2009 a CD-ROM with the title: der ton im wörtersee was published in the German language.

== Awards ==
He won the Deutscher Jugendliteraturpreis in 1983 and the Kassel Literary Prize in 1991. He won the Bertolt-Brecht-Literaturpreis in 1998, and the Rheingau Literatur Preis in 2002. In 2004 he was awarded the Heinrich Heine Prize, and in 2006, the Wilhelm Busch Prize.

The state-owned bank Helaba is sponsoring an award named after Gernhardt.

== See also ==
- List of German painters
