= Franziska Becker =

German cartoonist (born 1949)

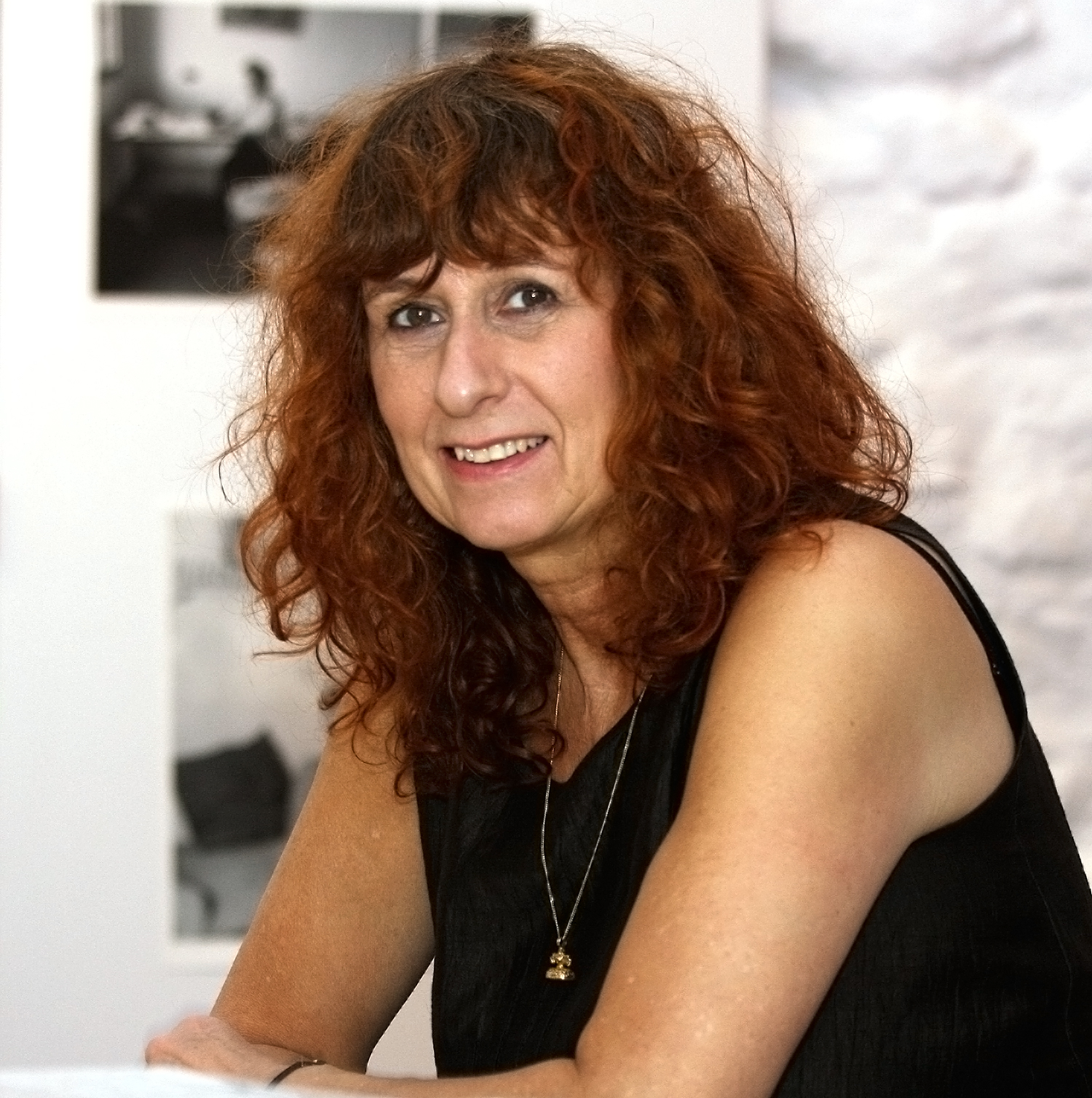
Becker in 2009

Franziska Becker (born 10 July 1949) is a German cartoonist.

== Biography ==
Franziska Becker was born in Mannheim in 1949. After finishing secondary school, she professionally trained as a technical medical assistant. Between 1972 and 1976 she studied at the Academy of Fine Arts in Karlsruhe, where she was taught by Markus Lüpertz, among others.

In 1973 she became involved in the feminist movement in Heidelberg, where she met Alice Schwarzer, the editor-in-chief of the feminist magazine EMMA. Becker's first published cartoon appeared in the first issue of this magazine. Since then Becker's cartoons, caricatures and illustrations have appeared in numerous German magazines and journals. Further, she also has published twenty books. Her work has been seen in the tradition of caricaturist Marie Marcks, "the Grande Dame of political caricature in Germany".

In 1988 Becker was awarded the Max and Moritz Prize for best comic artist. In 2010, a solo exhibition was shown at the Caricatura Museum Frankfurt, consisting of some 300 works. In 2019 she was honoured with the Hedwig-Dohm-Award by the German Union of Women Journalists.

== Controversy ==
Following the award, some of her cartoons showing Muslim women in headscarves and burqas were criticized on social media and by German journalists Sibel Schick and Teresa Bücker as racist stereotypes. In an interview Becker commented about these accusations. She stated that satire should be allowed to be critical and that her caricatures of some Muslim women were meant to criticize Islamist attitudes and the obligatory headscarf. On the other hand, German activist Zana Ramadani, of Albanian Muslim descent, defended Becker's caricatures on the grounds of her own experience and opposition towards obligatory headscarfs.

== Awards ==
- 1988: Max & Moritz Prize
- 2012: Göttinger Elch
- 2013: Wilhelm Busch Prize
- 2019: Hedwig-Dohm-Urkunde
