= Martin Sonneborn =

German satirist, journalist and politician

Martin Sonneborn MEP
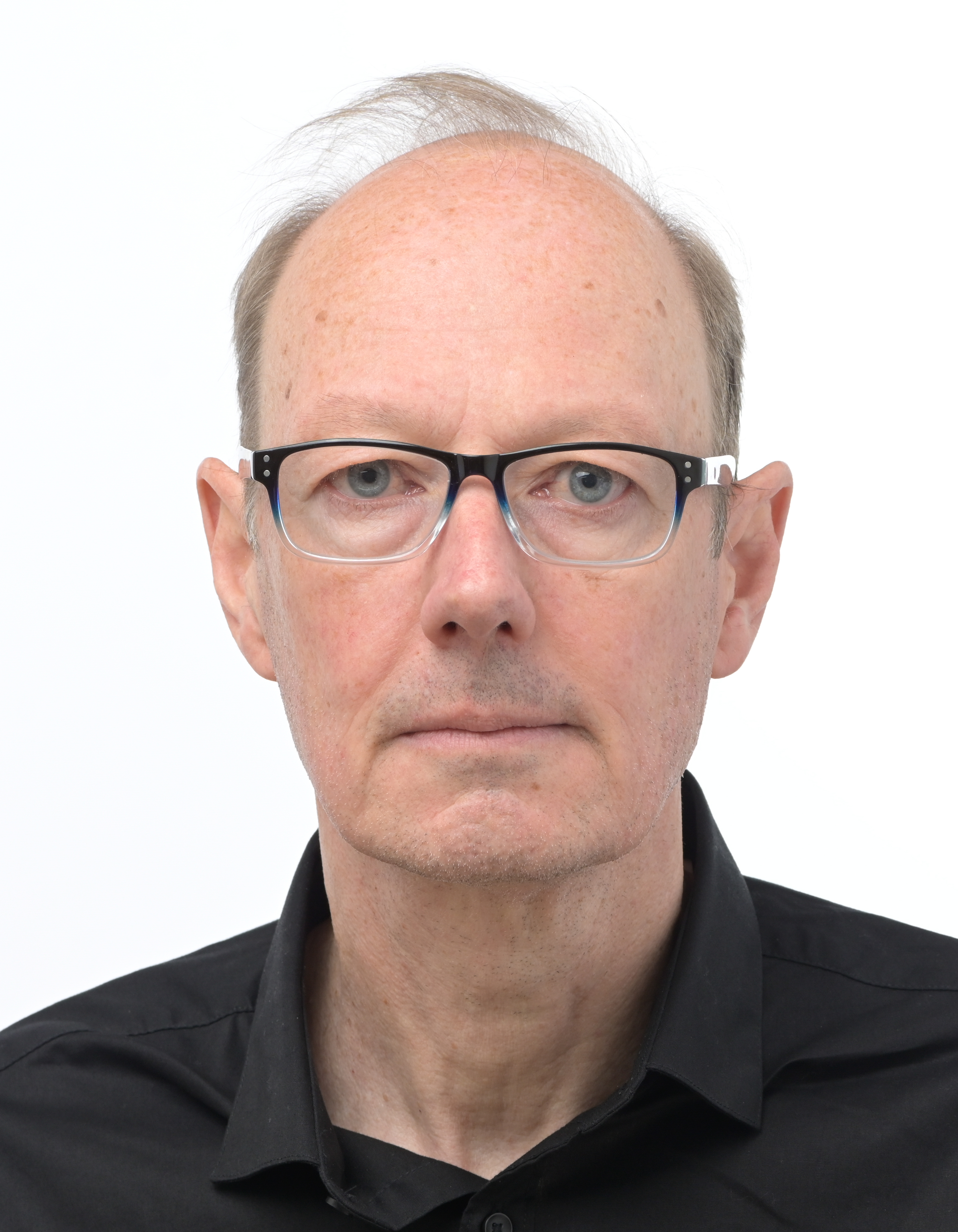
- Sonneborn in 2024

Leader of Die PARTEI
- Incumbent
- Assumed office 2 August 2004
- Deputy: Peter Mendelsohn
- General Secretary: Thomas Hintner
- Preceded by: Office established

Member of the European Parliament for Germany
- Incumbent
- Assumed office 1 July 2014
- Constituency: Germany

Personal details
- Born: Martin Hans Sonneborn; 15 May 1965 (age 61) Göttingen, West Germany
- Party: Die PARTEI
- Children: 2
- Education: Communication; German; Political science
- Website: martinsonneborn.de

Martin Hans Sonneborn (German pronunciation: [ˈmaʁtiːn ˈhans ˈzɔnəbɔʁn]; born 15 May 1965) is a German politician and Member of the European Parliament (MEP). He is a founder and federal chairman of Die PARTEI. He was editor-in-chief of the satirical magazine Titanic from 2000 to 2005 and works for Spiegel Online and ZDF.

== Family and early life ==
Sonneborn grew up with his brother as a son of the career counselor and later presidential candidate Engelbert Sonneborn and a housewife. He was born in Göttingen. He went to school in Osnabrück, where he passed the Abitur exam. After military service and a successful apprenticeship as an insurance salesman, he studied communication, German and Politics in Münster, Vienna and Berlin. His master's thesis covered the satirical magazine Titanic and the complete lack of effectivity of satire. Sonneborn's father was an independent candidate in the 2017 German presidential election. Sonneborn has two daughters.

== Career ==
After undertaking an internship at satirical magazine Eulenspiegel in 1995, Sonneborn started writing for Titanic, whose editor-in-chief he became in 2000. He was superseded by Thomas Gsella in October 2005, but remained column writer until April 2012. He has been co-editor of Titanic since 2006. Sonneborn was staff leader of satirical column SPAM at Spiegel Online since November 2006 and reporter for the satirical TV programme heute-show on ZDF from May 2009 to September 2014.

On 2 August 2004 Sonneborn founded, along with other editors of Titanic, the satirical political party Die PARTEI, one of whose aims is to rebuild the Berlin Wall. He has been its chairman since 2004 and was the lead candidate in the 2011 Berlin state election. During the election campaign in 2005 Sonneborn appeared in a number of TV campaign commercials. Along with director Andreas Coerper, Sonneborn filmed a documentary about the party's development and activities from foundation until 2009.

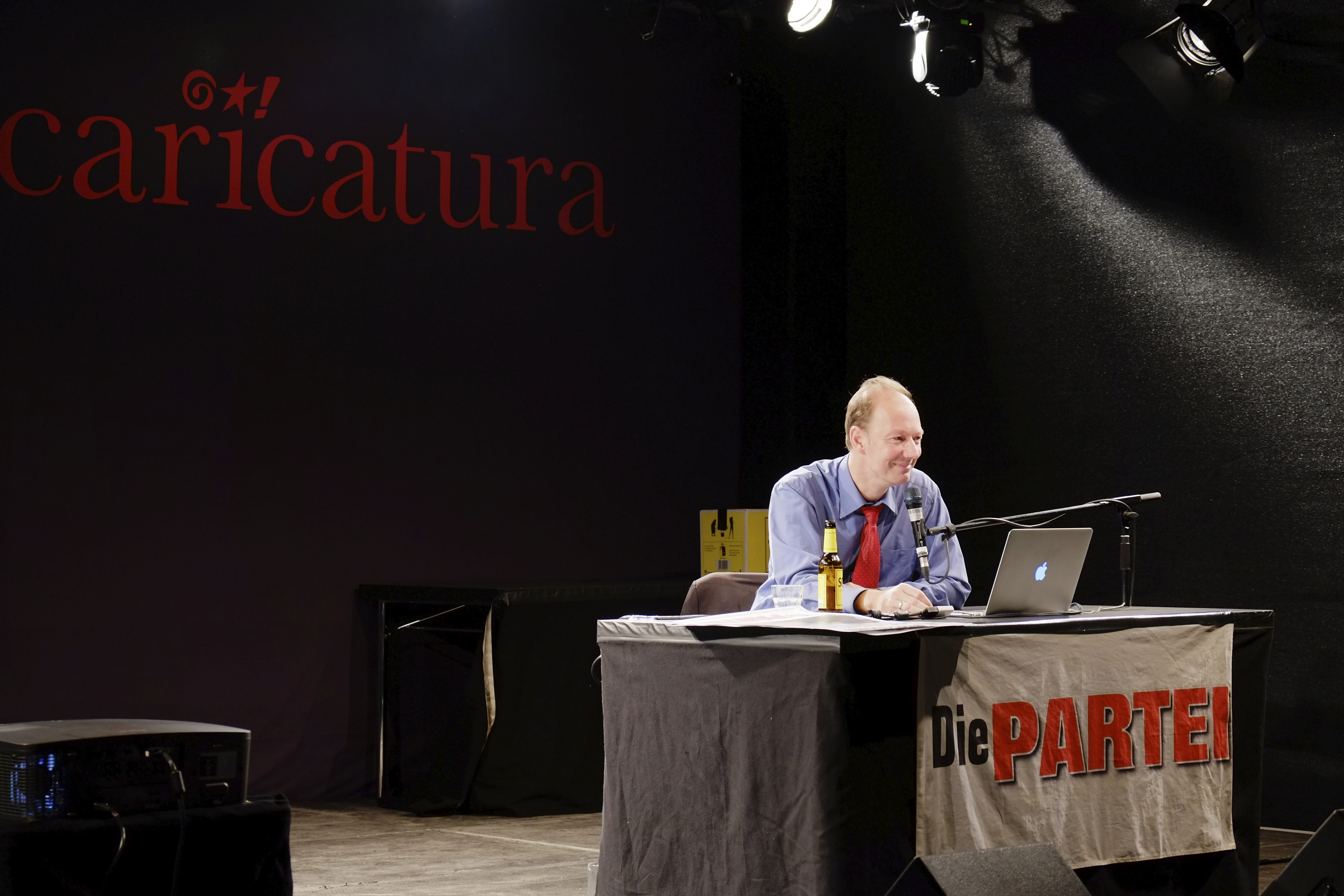
Sonneborn in 2013

He regularly holds readings both solo and as part of the trio Titanic Boygroup, together with Thomas Gsella and Oliver Maria Schmitt who preceded Sonneborn as editor-in-chief.

After joining the European Parliament in 2014, he had to quit his jobs at Spiegel Online and ZDF since both companies wanted to stay objective in presenting politics. He is a member of the European Parliament Committee on Culture and Education (CULT), member of the Korea-delegation and substitute of the European Parliament Committee on Budgetary Control (CONT).

In August 2018, Sonneborn met with Armenian Prime Minister Nikol Pashinyan, who thanked him for his "pro-Armenian activities within the European Parliament, especially as regards the Armenian Genocide and the Nagorno-Karabakh conflict".

In February 2023, Sonneborn was one of 69 first signatories of the Manifest für Frieden initiated by politician Sahra Wagenknecht and publicist Alice Schwarzer, which calls for a stop to arms deliveries to Ukraine and a ceasefire and peace negotiations with Russia.

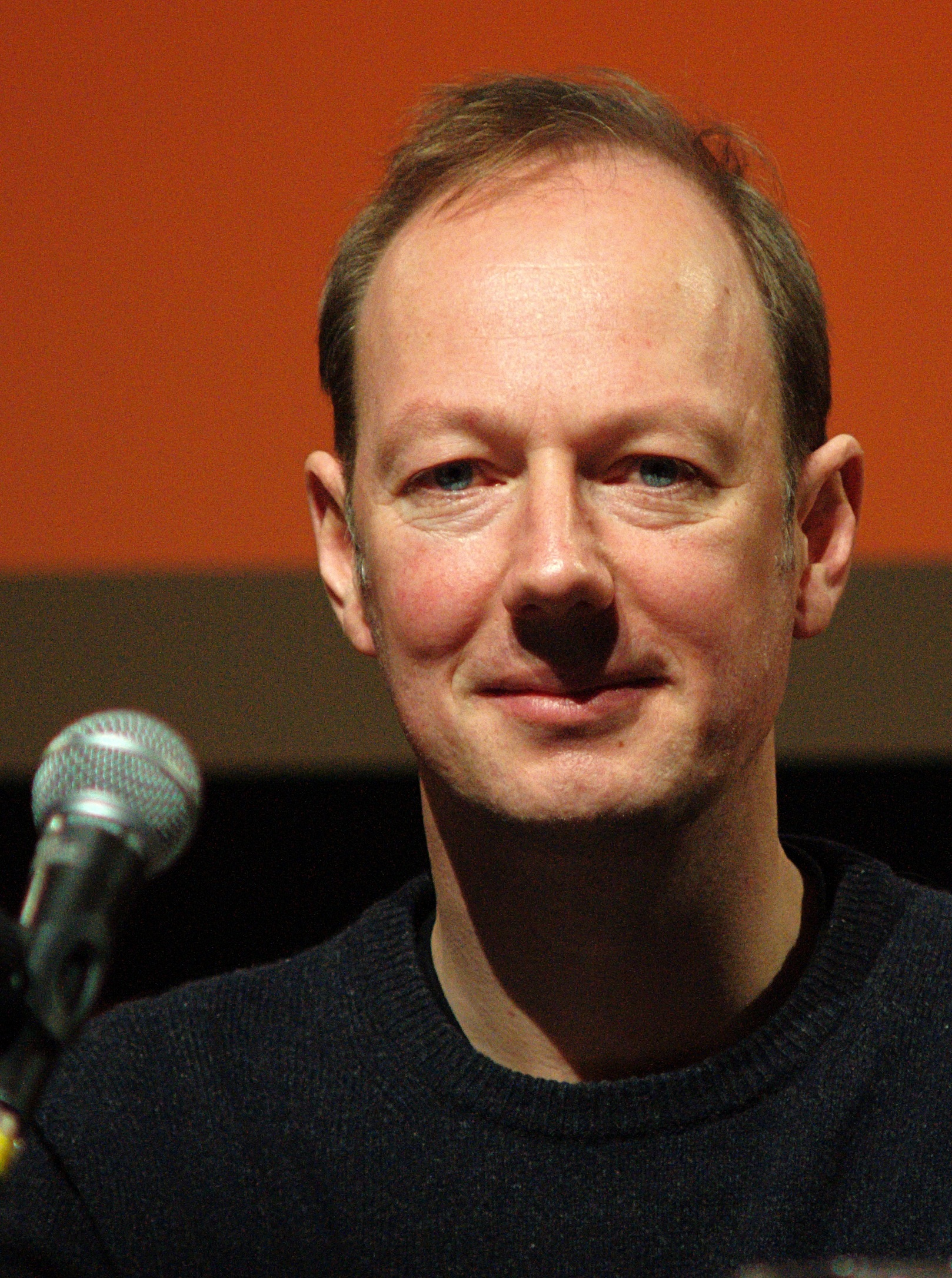
Sonneborn in 2009

== Controversy ==
In September 2011 he was criticized by UK media for a blackface Obama billboard "Ick bin ein Obama." (I am an Obama.) in the Berlin election campaign, a satirical reference to a speech by John F. Kennedy.

== Bibliography ==
- "Ich tat es für mein Land." Wie TITANIC einmal die Fußball-WM 2006 nach Deutschland holte: Protokoll einer erfolgreichen Bestechung. Bombus, München 2005, ISBN 978-3-936261-37-0.
- Das PARTEI-Buch: Wie man in Deutschland eine Partei gründet und die Macht übernimmt. Kiepenheuer & Witsch Verlag, Köln 2009, ISBN 978-3-462-04090-6.
- Heimatkunde: Eine Expedition in die Zone. Ullstein Hc, 29. September 2010, ISBN 978-3-550-08791-2.
- Ich will auch mal Kanzler werden. Kiepenheuer & Witsch Verlag, Köln 2011, ISBN 978-34-620-4257-3.
- Quatsch...und mehr. Kiepenhauer & Witsch, 2012, ISBN 978-3-462-04475-1.
- Beerdigung von Herrn Krodinger im Biergarten: Ein Schild sagt mehr als 1000 Worte. Kiepenhauer & Witsch, Köln 2015, ISBN 978-3-462-04775-2.
- Titanic BoyGroup Greatest Hits - 20 Jahre Krawall für Deutschland. Rowohlt, Berlin 2015, ISBN 978-3-87134-818-1.

== Filmography ==
- 2008: Heimatkunde
- 2009: Die PARTEI
- 2010: The Final Fax
- 2013: Sonneborn rettet die Welt at ZDFneo
- 2014: Sonneborn rettet die EU at SpiegelOnline
- 2019: Sonneborn Semsrott - Für Europa reicht's
