= F. W. Bernstein =

German poet and cartoonist (1938–2018)

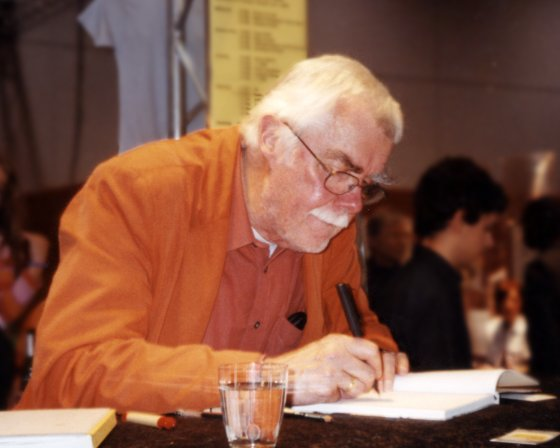
- Bernstein in 2005
- Born: Fritz Weigle; 4 March 1938; Göppingen, Germany
- Died: 20 December 2018 (aged 80); Berlin, Germany
- Education: Stuttgarter Kunstakademie; Berlin Academy of the Arts; Free University of Berlin
- Occupations: Poet; cartoonist; satirist; academic
- Organizations: pardon; Berlin Academy of the Arts; Neue Frankfurter Schule
- Spouse: Sabine Weigle
- Awards: Kassel Literary Prize; Wilhelm Busch Prize

F. W. Bernstein (born Fritz Weigle; 4 March 1938 – 20 December 2018) was a German poet, cartoonist, satirist, and academic. He worked for the satirical biweekly pardon. After teaching at schools, he was professor of caricature and comics at the Berlin Academy of the Arts from 1984 to 1999. He was one of the founding members of the Neue Frankfurter Schule, which published the satirical magazine Titanic.

== Career ==
Born in Göppingen on 4 March 1938, Fritz Weigle was the only son of Anna (née Krathwohl) and Friedrich Weigle. He attended the gymnasium in Göppingen, where he was known by the nickname Bernstein. (Note: Nickname probably because he was always raving about the American cartoonist Saul Steinberg.) He studied from 1957 at the Stuttgarter Kunstakademie where he met Robert Gernhardt. In 1958, they both moved to the Berlin Academy of the Arts. Weigle returned to Stuttgart where he took the exam to be an art teacher in 1961. Later in 1961, he studied graphics in Berlin, and simultaneously German at the Free University of Berlin, completing in 1964. He began work as a teacher in 1966 in Frankfurt-Sachsenhausen at the Freiherr-vom-Stein-Schule, followed by a post in Bad Homburg vor der Höhe from 1968.

He taught at the Georg-Büchner-Gymnasium in Bad Vilbel from 1970 to 1972, and moved then to the School of education (Pädagogische Hochschule) in Göttingen. He was appointed professor of caricature and comics at the Berlin Academy of the Arts in 1984, the only such chair, and held the post until he retired in 1999. In April 1964, he began work for the satirical biweekly magazine pardon. He founded together with Gernhardt and F. K. Waechter its appendix Welt im Spiegel (World in the mirror), published until 1976.

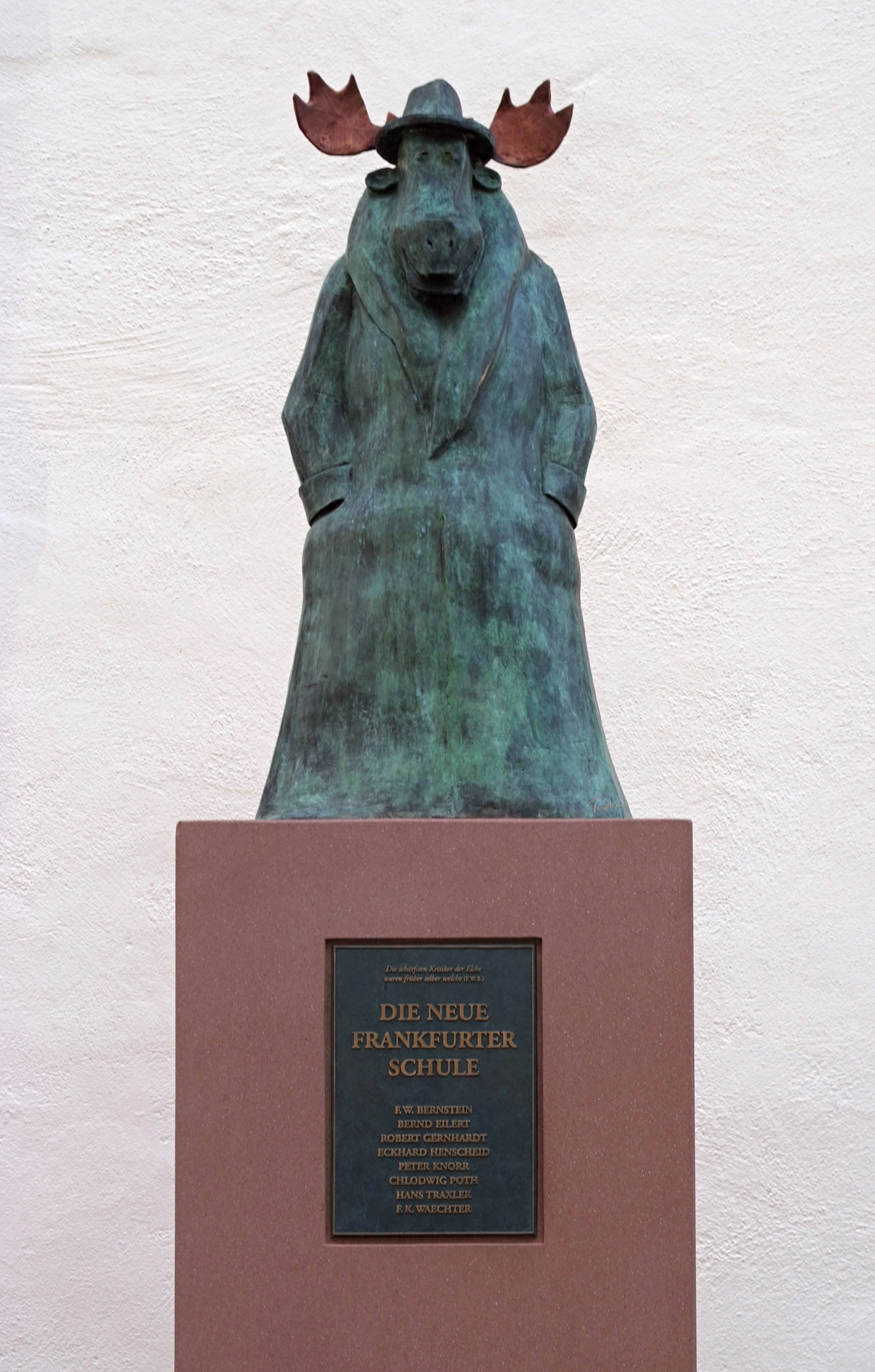
"Die schärfsten Kritiker der Elche waren früher selber welche“ ("The hottest critics of the moose were formerly ones themselves") Bronze by Hans Traxler in front of the Caricatura Museum Frankfurt

Together with Gernhardt, Eckhard Henscheid, Waechter, Chlodwig Poth, Bernd Eilert, Peter Knorr, and Hans Traxler, Bernstein founded the group Neue Frankfurter Schule, publishing the satirical magazine Titanic from 1979.

F. W. Bernstein lived and worked in Berlin-Steglitz. He and his wife Sabine had two children. He died on 20 December 2018, aged 80.

== Work ==
His works are held by the German National Library, including:

- with Robert Gernhardt and F. K. Waechter (1966). Die Wahrheit über Arnold Hau: fiktive Biografie (in German). Frankfurt am Main: Fischer. ISBN 978-3-596-13230-0.
- Fritz Weigle (1969). Lehrprobe – Report aus dem Klassenzimmer (in German). Frankfurt am Main: Bärmeier & Nikel.
- with mit Robert Gernhardt (1976). Besternte Ernte. Gedichte (in German). Frankfurt am Main: S. Fischer Verlag. ISBN 3-596-13229-0.
- Der Zeichner als – Sehr interessante Zeichnungen (in German). Göttingen: Studentenwerk. 1978.
- with Robert Gernhardt and F. K. Waechter (1994). Welt im Spiegel. WimS 1964–1976 (in German). Frankfurt am Main: Zweitausendeins. ISBN 3-86150-050-7.
- Reimwärts: Gedichte (in German). Gießen: Anabis. 1981. ISBN 3-87038-087-X.
- with F. K. Waechter and Robert Gernhardt (1981). Die Drei: Die Wahrheit über Arnold Hau / Besternte Ernte / Die Blusen der Böhmen (in German). Frankfurt am Main: Zweitausendeins. ISBN 3-86150-022-1.
- with Alfred Messerli and Dieter Richter (1984). Die Kinderfinder. Reisen in alte Bilder (in German). Hamburg: VSA-Verlag.
- with Eckhard Henscheid, ed. (1982). Unser Goethe – Ein Lesebuch (in German). Zweitausendeins.
- with Reinhold Wittig (1984). Kleine Phantasieschule: Spiel (in German). Göttingen: Edition Perlhuhn.
- with Eckhard Henscheid (1984). Literarischer Traum- und Wunschkalender auf das Jahr 1985 in Wort und Bild (in German). Zürich: Haffmans.
- Sternstunden eines Federhalters – Neues vom Zeichner Lebtag (in German). Zürich: Haffmans. 1992. ISBN 3-251-00067-5.
- with Eckhard Henscheid (1987). TV-Zombies – Bilder und Charaktere (in German). Zürich: Haffmans. ISBN 3-251-00115-9.
- Lockruf der Liebe: Gedichte (in German). Zürich: Haffmans. 1988. ISBN 3-251-00118-3.
- Bernsteins Buch der Zeichnerei – Ein Lehr-, Lust-, Sach- und Fach-Buch sondergleichen (in German). Zürich: Haffmans. 1989. ISBN 3-86150-185-6.
- Die Luftfracht, ein teurer Spaß (in German). Schwäbisch Gmünd: Stecknadel Klink. 1990. ISBN 3-927350-03-6.
- Kampf dem Lern (in German). Gießen: Anabas. 1991. ISBN 3-87038-165-5.
- Der Blechbläser und sein Kind. Grafik, Gritik, Gomik (in German). Greiz: Weisser Stein. 1993. ISBN 3-928681-20-6.
- Wenn Engel, dann solche (in German). München: Verlag Antje Kunstmann. 1994. ISBN 3-88897-092-X.
- Reimweh – Gedichte und Prosa (in German). Reclam-Verlag. 1994. ISBN 3-15-009308-2.
- Die Stunde der Männertränen – Texte auf Papier (in German). Berlin: Edition Tiamat. 1995. ISBN 3-923118-54-6.
- with Manfred Bofinger (1999). Berliner Bilderbuch brominenter Bersönlichkeiten (in German). Zweitausendeins. ISBN 3-86150-300-X.
- Die 3 Frisöre. Eine haarige Lesung von Robert Gernhardt, F. W. Bernstein und F. K. Waechter (in German). Zürich: Ullstein Hörverlag. 1999. ISBN 3-251-94568-8.
- Elche, Molche, ich und du: Tiergedichte (in German). München: Verlag Antje Kunstmann. 2000. ISBN 3-88897-248-5.
- Der Untergang Göttingens und andere Kunststücke in Wrt & Bld.: Materialsammlung und Lebensabschnittsbericht über die Zeit von 1972 bis 1985. Herausgegeben von Peter Köhler (in German). Göttingen: Satzwerk Verlag. 2000.
- Richard Wagners Fahrt ins Glück. Sein Leben in Bildern und Versen (in German). Alexander Fest. 2002. ISBN 3-8286-0140-5.
- In mir erwacht das Tier. Gedichte (in German). München: Verlag Antje Kunstmann. 2004. ISBN 3-88897-360-0.
- Kunst & Kikeriki (in German). Springe: Zu Klampen Verlag. 2004. ISBN 3-934920-40-3.
- Die Superfusseldüse. 19 Dramen in unordentlichem Zustand (in German). München: Kunstmann. 2006. ISBN 978-3-88897-450-2.
- Die Gedichte (in German) (2. ed.). München: Kunstmann. 2007. ISBN 978-3-88897-340-6.
- Meister der komischen Kunst: F. W. Bernstein (in German). München: Kunstmann. 2012. ISBN 978-3-88897-757-2.
- with Henner Drecher, Rosemarie Heilig, Stephan Heldmann, Katja Aplet, Dieter Batezko, Peter Strege, Harry Oberländer and Grünflächenamt Frankfurt am Main (2014). Bäume (in German). Frankfurt am Main: Dielmann. ISBN 978-3-86638-189-6.
- Frische Gedichte. Verlag Antje Kunstmann, München 2017, ISBN 978-3-95614-169-0.

== Exhibitions ==
- 2011 F. W. Bernstein: Den Rest können Sie sich denken! Mathematikum
- 2013 F. W. Bernstein zum 75. Geburtstag. Wilhelm Busch – Deutsches Museum für Karikatur & Zeichenkunst
- 2013 F. W. Bernstein – Zeichenzausels Werkschau. Museum für Komische Kunst, Frankfurt am Main

== Awards ==
Bernstein received several awards, including:

- 2003: Göttinger Elch
- 2003: Binding-Kulturpreis
- 2008: Kassel Literary Prize for grotesque humour
- 2008: Wilhelm Busch Prize
- 2011: Deutscher Karikaturenpreis
- 2018: Ludwig Emil Grimm-Preis for caricature

== Notes ==
Awards
Preceded by Karl Otto Götz	Binding-Kulturpreis; 2003; With: Bernd Eilert; Robert Gernhardt; Peter Knorr; Chlodwig Poth; Hans Traxler; F. K. Waechter	Succeeded by Hans Günther Bastian
Preceded by Heinz Kreutz	Binding-Kulturpreis; 2003; With: Bernd Eilert; Robert Gernhardt; Peter Knorr; Chlodwig Poth; Hans Traxler; F. K. Waechter	Succeeded by Hans Günther Bastian
Preceded by Otto Greis	Binding-Kulturpreis; 2003; With: Bernd Eilert; Robert Gernhardt; Peter Knorr; Chlodwig Poth; Hans Traxler; F. K. Waechter	Succeeded by Karl Rarichs
Preceded by Bernard Schultze	Binding-Kulturpreis; 2003; With: Bernd Eilert; Robert Gernhardt; Peter Knorr; Chlodwig Poth; Hans Traxler; F. K. Waechter	Succeeded by Karl Rarichs
Preceded by Gerhard Polt	Kassel Literary Prize; 2008	Succeeded by Peter Rühmkorf
Preceded by Loriot	Wilhelm Busch Prize; 2008	Succeeded by Ernst Kahl
