= Jürgen Grässlin =

German author and peace activist (born 1957)

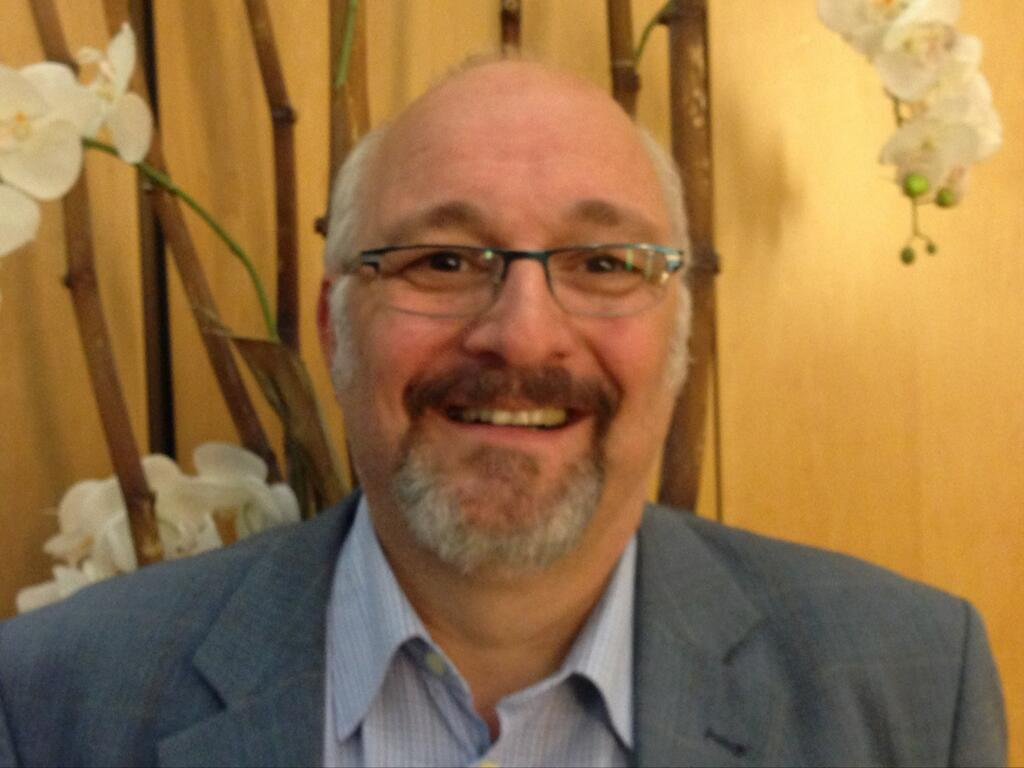
Jürgen Grässlin (2013)

Jürgen Grässlin (born 18 September 1957 in Lörrach) is a German teacher, journalist and peace activist, who rejects the use of violence. Since the 1990s he is regarded as the most prominent German opponent of the weapons industry. Having published several books concerning the automotive industry, the arms industry as well as the German army (Bundeswehr), he is the spokesperson of the German Peace Society, (ger. Deutschen Friedensgesellschaft-Vereinigte KriegsdienstgegnerInnen) and of other associations, supporting disarmament.

== Life ==
Grässlin and his family moved to Freiburg im Breisgau in 1960. After obtaining the Abitur, a document similar to A-levels enabling German students to attend university, Grässlin attended Freiburg University of Education (ger. Pädagogische Hochschule Freiburg). In 1978 his studies were interrupted as Grässlin was conscripted for military service, which ended after five months officially for health reasons. He started teaching at a Realschule, a German type of secondary school, in 1982. Since 1983 he works actively against arms transfer by Heckler & Koch and other arms factories. In 1989 he founded the Rüstungs-Informationsbüro Oberndorf (RIO), an organization informing about arms transfers all over the world and peacefully demonstrating to raise awareness for the topic, in Oberndorf am Neckar. In the same city in which Heckler & Koch headquarters are located. Moving to Freiburg, the RIO changed into RüstungsInformationsBüro (RIB), which was co-founded by Grässlin himself, in 1992. Right after the founding Grässlin served as chairperson, today he serves as a RIB board member still advocating the stop of all arms transfers. The RIB includes an extensive archive consisting of information about military in general, arms production and arms transfers. Grässlin is married, father to two children and lives in Freiburg.

== Controversy ==
In February 2023, Grässlin was one of the initial signers of Manifest für Frieden, a petition to Olaf Scholz calling for an end to military support to Ukraine in the wake of the 2022 Russian invasion of Ukraine.
