= Pardon (magazine) =

pardon
- Editor: Hans A. Nikel; Erich Bärmeier
- Categories: Satirical magazine
- Frequency: biweekly
- First issue: 27 August 1962
- Final issue: July 1982
- Country: Germany
- Based in: Frankfurt
- Language: German

pardon was a German satirical magazine, which appeared biweekly from 1962 to 1982. It was published to criticise the conservative situation of the Adenauer era.

pardon worked in a combination of politics and humour, information and satire, philosophy and graphics. Its authors included students who became known only later, writers Robert Gernhardt and F. W. Bernstein, and graphic artists F. K. Waechter, Kurt Halbritter, Hans Traxler, Volker Ernsting and Chlodwig Poth. Guest authors included Alice Schwarzer, Günter Wallraff and Gerhard Kromschröder. Commentators included Freimut Duve and Robert Jungk. Wilhelm Genazino was a member of the editorial staff for some time.

== History ==
=== 1961 to 1971 ===
A test version of pardon appeared in 1961, the first regular issue appeared om 27 August 1962, founded by publishers Hans A. Nikel and Erich Bärmeier. Loriot designed the first title page. Among the first writers were Werner Finck, Wolfgang Bauer, Hans Magnus Enzensberger, Martin Walser and Günter Grass. pardon was successful from the start. The FAZ summarised later that pardon influenced the zeitgeist of its era, leaving a mark on post-war history ("Pardon hat unter Nikels Leitung mit dessen literarisch-satirischem Spürsinn 18 Jahre lang Einfluss auf den Zeitgeist der Republik genommen – eine markante Phase der Nachkriegsgeschichte.") pardon was for a while the most popular satirical magazine in Europe, reaching more than 1.5 million regular readers then. The politician Franz Josef Strauß began 18 legal cases against the magazine, and lost them all.

=== Reorganisation ===
In 1971, Erich Bärmeier left the team. Several authors disliked a change to less satire and more film and travel topics. Some of them founded the group Neue Frankfurter Schule which published the Titanic magazine from 1979. Nikel won authors such as Elke Heidenreich and Peter Härtling, among others. He discovered new talent, including Paul Badde and Matthias Horx. He published caricatures by Tom Bunk, Freimut Wössner, Gerhard Seyfried, Brösel and Bernd Pfarr. Nikel ended his tenure in October 1980, leaving the pardon license to Hermann L. Gremliza of konkret, with chief editor Henning Venske. Their first issue appeared in May 1982, but the magazine was discontinued in July that year. Revivals have been tried but were shortlived.

== Literature ==
- Oliver Maria Schmitt: Die schärfsten Kritiker der Elche in Wort und Strich und Bild. Alexander Fest, Berlin 2001, ISBN 3-8286-0109-X.
- Kurt Halbritter: Adolf Hitler's Mein Kampf - Gezeichnete Erinnerungen an eine Große Zeit [Adolf Hitler's My Struggle - drawn memories of a big time]. (1968)
  - Carl Hanser Verlag, 4. edition 1998, ISBN 3-446-15063-3.
  - NBad Malente: Vitolibro. 2014, ISBN 978-3-86940-110-2
