= Teresa Bücker =

German journalist, author

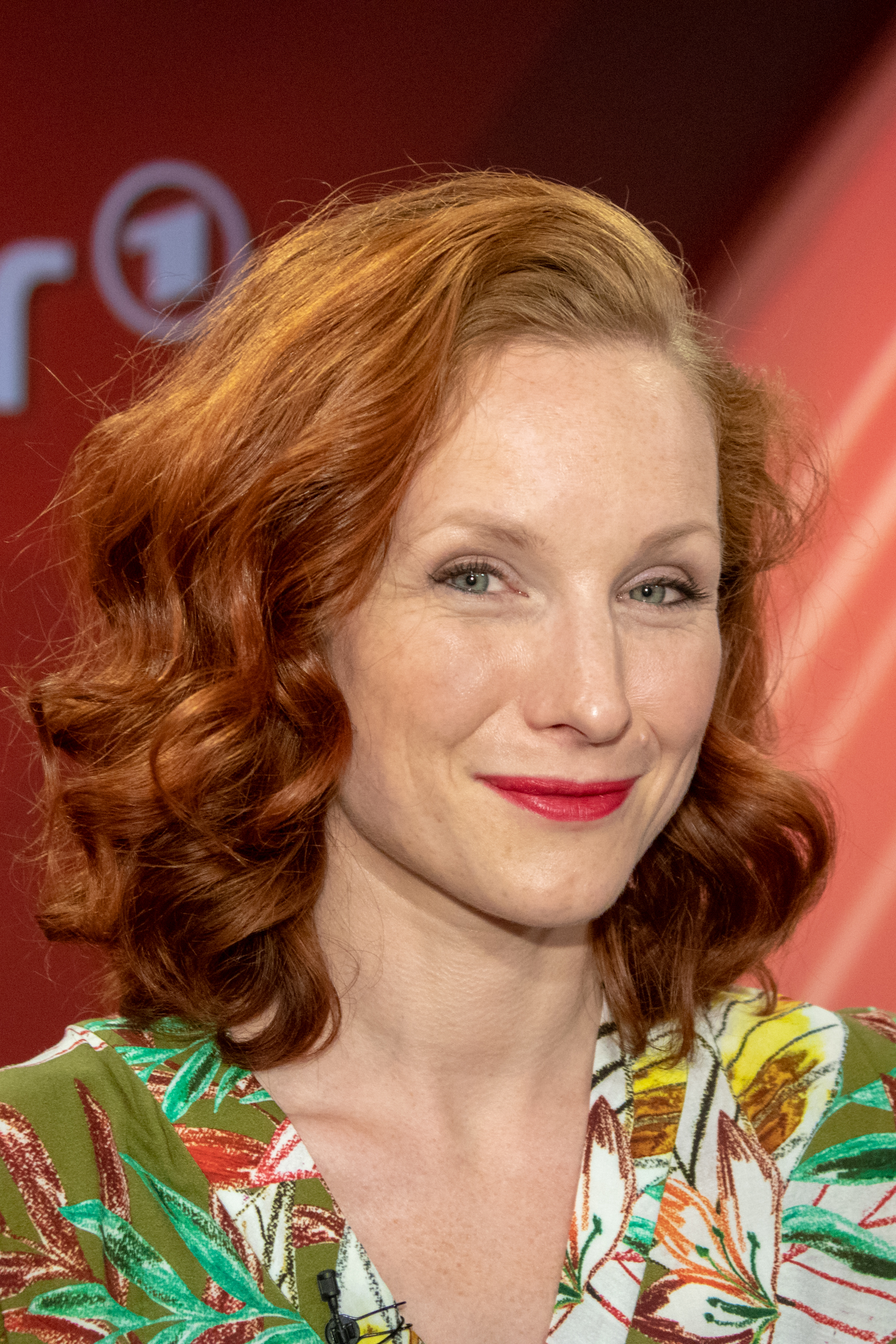
Teresa Bücker

Teresa Maria Bücker (born 13 March 1984 in Meschede) is a German journalist, author and blogger. She writes from a feminist perspective on contemporary socio-political issues. From 2017 to 2019, she was editor-in-chief of the online magazine Edition F.

== Life and work ==
Bücker grew up in Meschede and graduated from high school there in 2003. She then studied veterinary medicine at Free University of Berlin from 2003 to 2004 and journalism, psychology and politics from 2004 to 2008, but did not complete her studies. In 2007 she started to bloggen and since 2008 she has been active on Twitter. From 2008 to 2010, she was head of the Community and Social Media departments of the weekly newspaper der Freitag.

From 2010 to 2012, she worked as a consultant for digital strategy for the SPD party executive and from 2012 to 2014 as a consultant for social media for the SPD parliamentary group. In 2011, she was one of the founding members of the D64 - Centre for Digital Progress association, of which she was a member of the board from 2012 to 2014.

From 2014 to 2017, Bücker was editorial director of the feminist online magazine Edition F and its editor-in-chief from 2017 to 2019. Since November 2019, she has been writing the column Freie Radikale – die Ideenkolumne for the Süddeutsche Zeitung Magazin Online on a fortnightly basis.

At the same time, she wrote as a freelance author for other media, including the FAZ blog "Deus Ex Machina" and for Zeit Online. She was also a member of the jury for the Deutscher Reporterpreis from 2018 and a member of the jury for the Nannen Preis in 2019.

Bücker is the mother of two children and lives in a patchwork family in Berlin.
