= F. K. Waechter =

German cartoonist, author and playwright

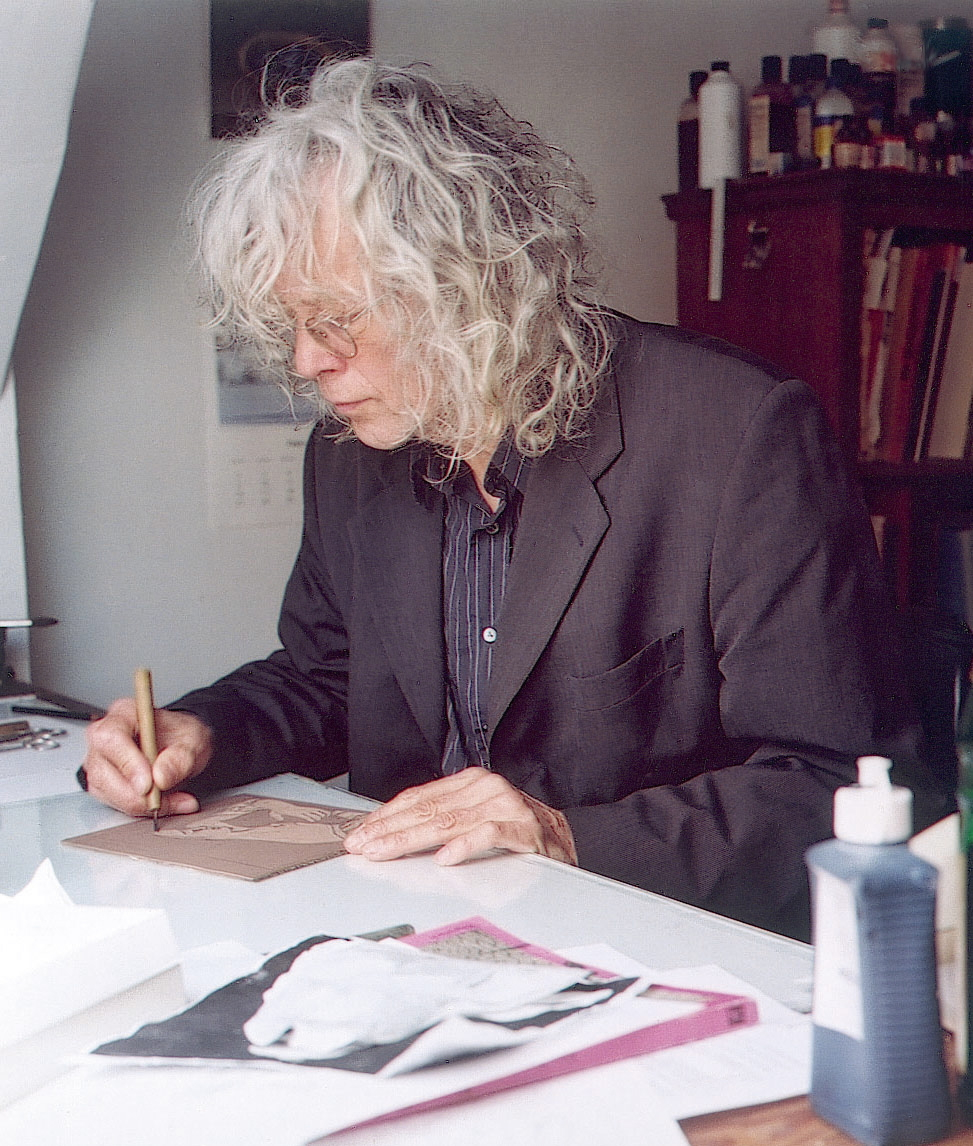
Waechter (2001)

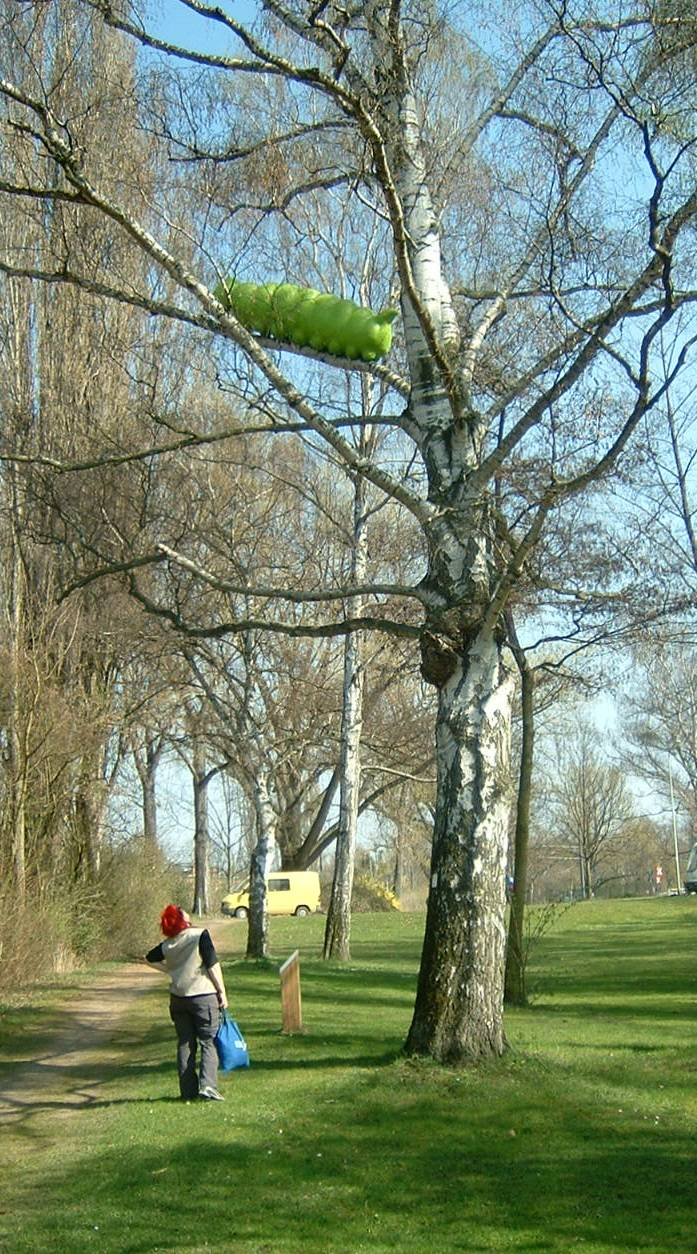
Sculpture Big caterpillar by Waechter

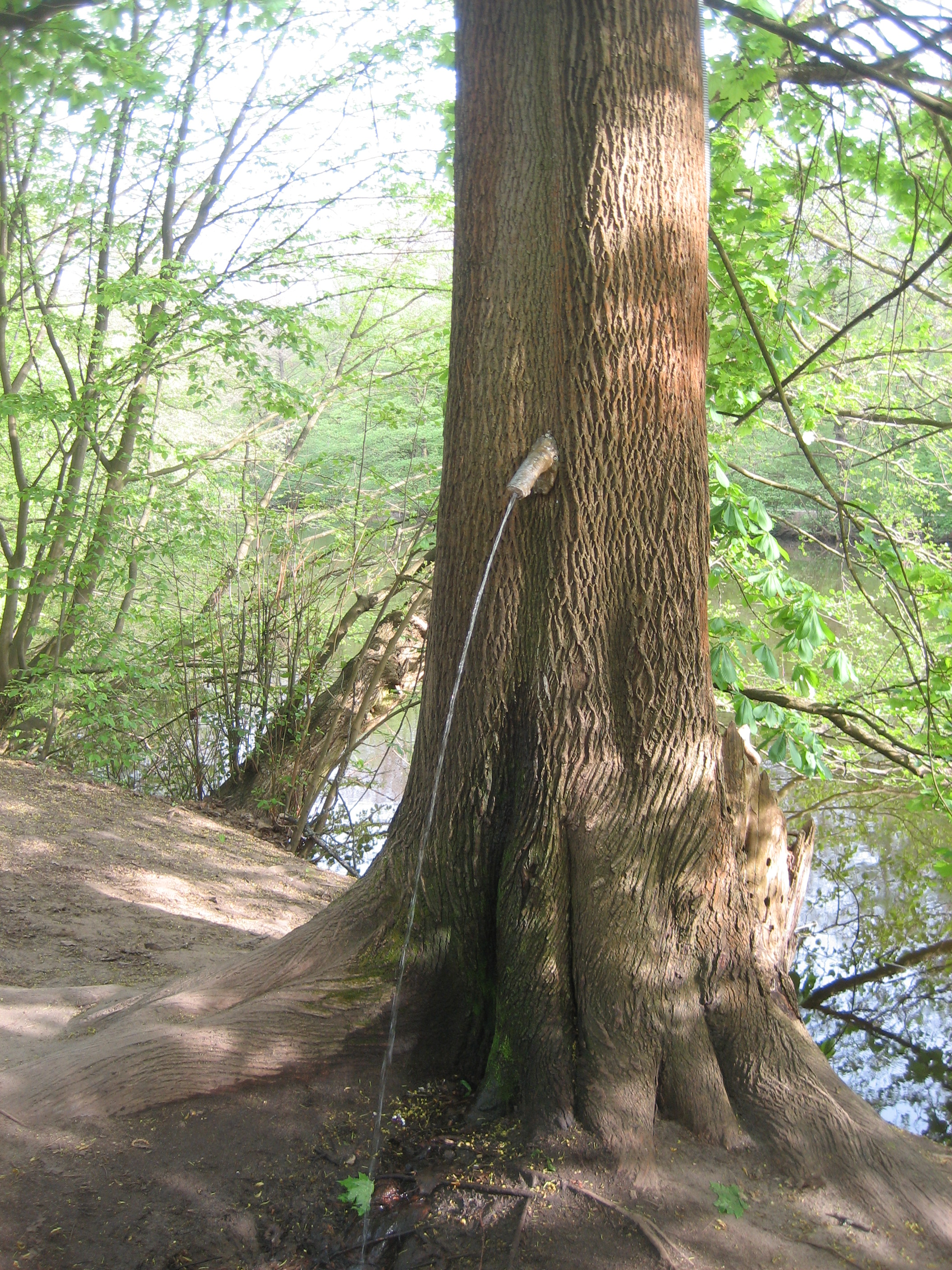
The Pinkelbaum, (peeing tree) by Waechter in the Frankfurt City Forest

Friedrich Karl Waechter (3 November 1937 in Danzig – 16 September 2005 in Frankfurt) was a renowned German cartoonist, author, and playwright.

== Life ==
Waechter was born in Danzig as a son of a teacher. His family fled over the Baltic Sea after World War II and settled in Sahms (Schleswig-Holstein).

Waechter attended the Lauenburg Scholar School in Ratzeburg, where his graphic talents became apparent. He then studied graphic art in Hamburg. In 1962, he moved to Frankfurt and took a job drawing cartoons in an advertisement magazine Die Zeit. His work attracted the attention of the editors of the soon-to-be satire magazine, Pardon. They gave Waechter a preliminary copy and asked for his suggestions. Waechter's constructive criticism earned him a job with the fledgling magazine.

While at Pardon, he co-founded the Neue Frankfurter Schule (New Frankfurt School), a group of eminent comic writers and cartoonists. The name was a play on the Frankfurter Schule of Theodor Adorno and Max Horkheimer. The group included Robert Gernhardt, F. W. Bernstein, Bernd Eilert, Eckhard Henscheid, Peter Knorr, Hans Traxler, and Chlodwig Poth. Their work celebrated subversive nonsense, typified by Pardon's regular "Welt in Spiegel" ("In the Mirror") feature.

Waechter became a father and, by 1970, began writing children's books. Many of these encouraged the reader to complete puzzles and drawings, write in the book, cut it up, or otherwise participate in the story. The books appealed to both children and adults and showcased his artistic talents: simple yet expressive cartoons, carefully cross-hatched pen and ink, collage, and realistic paintings. He would write some forty books throughout his life. They are typified by Anti-Struwwwelpeter ("Anti-Strawpeter," a parody of Heinrich Hoffman's popular German children's book, Struwwelpeter), Die Schoepfung (Waechter's re-telling of Biblical creation), and Der Kronenklauer ("The Crown Snatchers," an anti-authoritarian fable).

In 1979 he co-founded Titanic, another satirical magazine. His cartoons featured regularly until 1992, when he began focusing on teaching, writing books, and writing and directing plays.

Waechter's final work was Vollmond ("Full Moon"), a fantastic tale of a space journey. He completed it while undergoing treatment for lung cancer. He died on September 16, 2005, at the age of 67, leaving behind a wife and three sons.

== Honors ==
- 1975: Deutscher Jugendliteraturpreis for Wir können noch viel zusammen machen
- 1983: Brüder-Grimm-Preis des Landes Berlin
- 1993: Hessischer Kulturpreis
- 1999: Deutscher Jugendliteraturpreis for Der rote Wolf
- 2003: Alex-Wedding-Preis
- 2003: Preis der Binding-Kulturstiftung

== Books ==
- Ich bin der Größte, 1966 (Frankfurt am Main: Bärmeier & Nikel)
- Die Wahrheit über Arnold Hau, 1966 (with F. W. Bernstein and Robert Gernhardt).
- Der kleine Zweckermann, 1969 (Frankfurt am Main: Bärmeier & Nikel)
- Der Anti-Struwwelpeter, 1970
- Die Kronenklauer, 1972 (with Bernd Eilert)
- Tischlein deck dich und Knüppel aus dem Sack, 1972 (Subtitle: Ein neues Märchen)
- Brülle ich zum Fenster raus, 1973
- Wir können noch viel zusammen machen, 1973 (picture book)
- So dumm waren die Hebräer, 1973
- Das Ungeheuer-Spiel, 1975
- Opa Huckes Mitmach-Kabinett, 1976
- Schule mit Clowns, Der Teufel mit den drei goldenen Haaren, Pustekuchen (1975/76 Ellermann Verlag, Verlag der Autoren)
- Die Bauern im Brunnen, 1978
- Wahrscheinlich guckt wieder kein Schwein, 1978
- Kiebich und Dutz, 1979
- Die Reise, 1980 (Subtitle: Eine schrecklich schöne Bildergeschichte, "A Terribly Beautiful Picture History")
- Es lebe die Freihei..., 1981 ISBN 3-257-00303-X
- Fühlmäuse, 1981
- Wer kommt mit auf die Lofoten?, 1982
- Das Grundgesetz für die Bundesrepublik Deutschland, 1982
- Männer auf verlorenem Posten, 1983
- Nur den Kopf nicht hängen lassen, 1983
- Glückliche Stunde, 1986
- Die Mondtücher, 1988
- Mich wundert, daß ich fröhlich bin, 1991
- Die letzten Dinge, 1992
- Da bin ich, 1997
- F. K. Waechters Erzähltheater, 1997
- Der rote Wolf, 1998
- Mein 1. Glas Bier, 1998
- Der Kleine im Glaspott, 1999
- Die Geschichte vom albernen Hans, 2000
- Der Frosch und das Mädchen, 2000
- Steinhauers Fuß, 2001
- Die Schöpfung, 2002
- Waechter, 2002
- Prinz Hamlet, 2005
- Vollmond, 2005

== Plays (selection) ==
- Die Beinemacher (1974)
- Der Teufel mit den drei goldenen Haaren (1975)
- Die Bremer Stadtmusikanten (1977)
- Die Reise nach Aschenfeld (1984)
- Ausflug mit Clowns (1985)
- F. K. Waechters Ixypsilonzett (1990)
- Die letzten Dinge (1992)
- Die Eisprinzessin (1993, in two versions)
- Prinz Hamlet (1995)
- Lysistrata (after Aristophanes, 1997)
- Die Aschenputtler ( 1998)
- Tristan und Isolde (2002)
- Karneval der Tiere (2002)
- Der Narr des Königs (Kwast) (2003)

== Criticism ==
- Die schärfsten Kritiker der Elche. Die Neue Frankfurter Schule in Wort und Strich und Bild, Oliver Maria Schmitt, Berlin: Alexander Fest Verlag 2001. ISBN 3-8286-0109-X
