= Gerhard Seyfried =

German comic artist, cartoonist, and writer

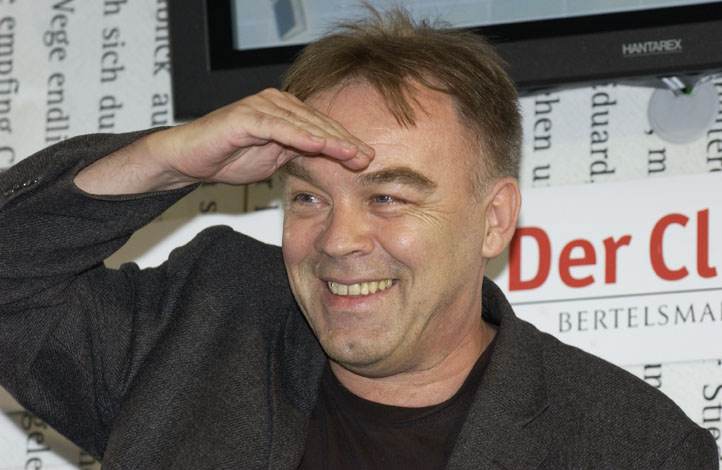
Gerhard Seyfried, 2004

Gerhard Seyfried (born March 15, 1948) is a German comic artist, cartoonist, and writer. One of the most popular German underground artists, he won the Max & Moritz Prize in 1990.

== Working method ==
With Flucht aus Berlin (1989/90) he changed his drawing style and switched from the "scurrying line that curls around the tiniest little things" (F. W. Bernstein) to ligne claire. In the meantime, he uses the computer to color his figures: "I draw with pencil, then trace it with ink, but no longer color by hand. That's too expensive and too toxic." His colleague Ziska judged, "He's very precise and an incredibly good technician." When he works alone on a new comic book, he does without a "storyboard," i.e., a visualized scene book, and relies entirely on his spontaneous intuition. Only in the case of the comic albums that were created together with Ziska was a storyboard developed jointly.

When writing his historical novels, on the other hand, he first reconstructs the "framework of historical events." To do this, however, he does not limit himself to the historical-scientific secondary literature, but researches archives for original documents and primary sources. Old photographs are also helpful to him, since he can "glean a vast amount of stuff from them." Only at the end of the research does he connect the context of the events with fictional characters, who act primarily as observers.
