= Neue Frankfurter Schule =

Group of satirical artists and writers

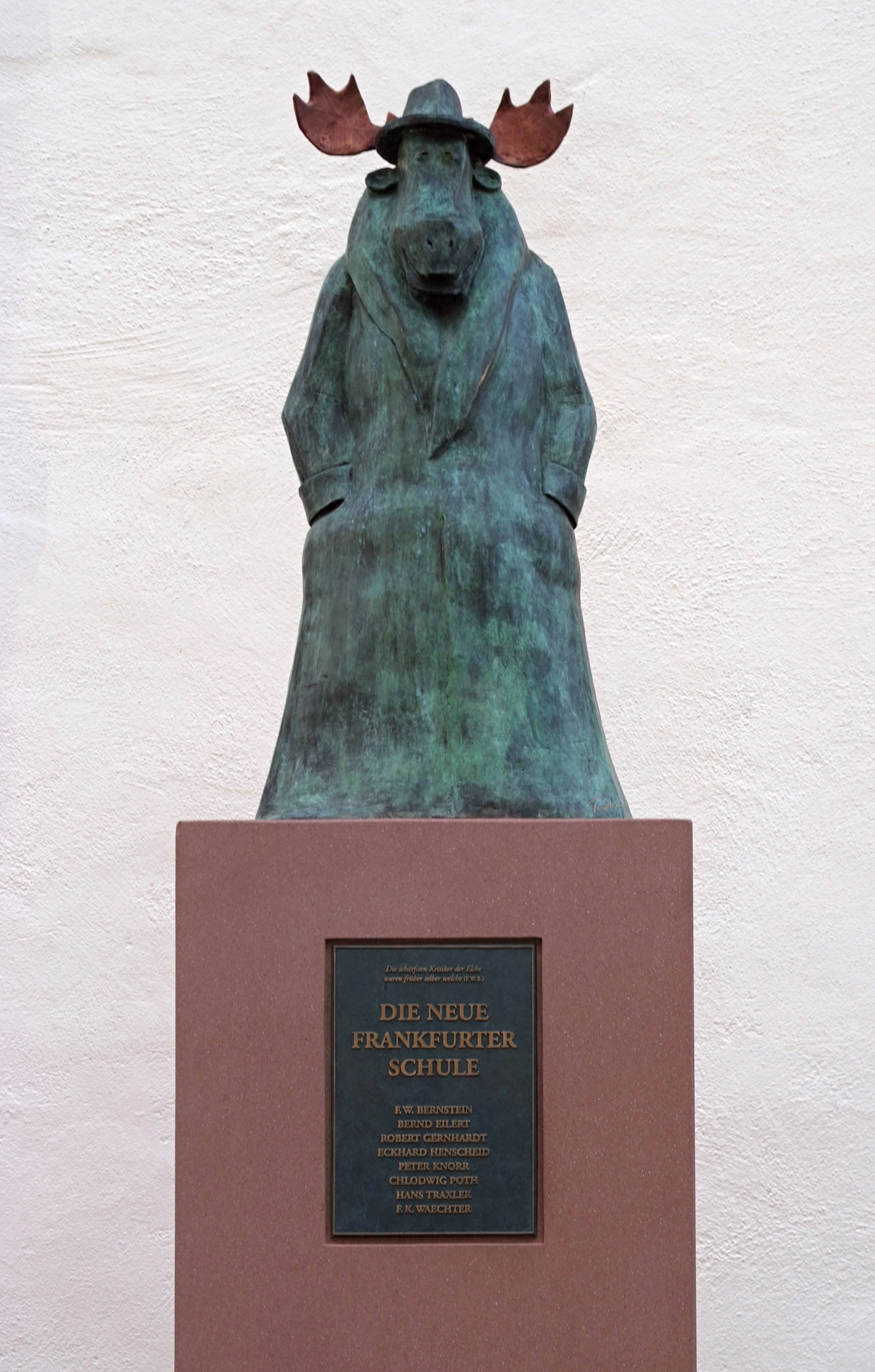
"Die schärfsten Kritiker der Elche / waren früher selber welche" Bronze sculpture by Hans Traxler in front of the Caricatura Museum Frankfurt

Neue Frankfurter Schule (NFS, New Frankfurt School) is a group of writers and artists which was founded by former members of the editorial staff of the German satirical magazine pardon. They have published the magazine Titanic from 1979.

== History ==
Among the founding members of the group, which first had no name, were:

- F. W. Bernstein (1938–2018)
- Bernd Eilert (born 1949)
- Robert Gernhardt (1937–2006)
- Eckhard Henscheid (born 1941)
- Peter Knorr (born 1939)
- Chlodwig Poth (1930–2004)
- Hans Traxler (1929-2026)
- F. K. Waechter (1937–2005)

The name Neue Frankfurter Schule was chosen in memory of the philosophical Frankfurter Schule (Frankfurt School) around Max Horkheimer and Theodor W. Adorno, among others, which had pursued a critical theory of society in the 1930s. The name Neue Frankfurter Schule alludes firstly to Frankfurt as a centre for many members and the publication of Titanic. Secondly, the name is a satiric allusion to the Franfurter Schule. Thirdly, serious similarities connect the NFS to the critical theory of the former group. Oliver Maria Schmitt regards cultural critic as the focus of the NFS, Michael Rutschky noted that the satirical conscience ("satirisches Bewußtsein") of the NFS is the focus of the Frankfurter Schule.

The name was chosen years after the forming of the group, in 1981, when a good name was needed for an exhibition of works by Gernhardt, Traxlera and Waechter.

A second generation of NFS members has included Max Goldt, Gerhard Henschel, Simon Borowiak, Thomas Gsella, Ernst Kahl, Duo Rattelschneck and, after the Peaceful Revolution, Michael Rudolf.

In 2006, the city of Frankfurt acquired c. 7,000 original drawings by Bernstein, Gernhardt, Traxler and Poth for a new museum of comic art, the Caricatura Museum Frankfurt, which was opened on 1 October 2008 as an independent department of the Historical Museum.

== Literature ==
- W. P. Fahrenberg (ed.): Die Neue Frankfurter Schule, ARKANA Göttingen 1987, ISBN 3-923257-70-8
- Oliver Maria Schmitt: Die schärfsten Kritiker der Elche. Die Neue Frankfurter Schule in Wort und Strich und Bild, Berlin 2001, ISBN 3-8286-0109-X
- Klaus Cäsar Zehrer: Dialektik der Satire. Zur Komik von Robert Gernhardt und der ‚Neuen Frankfurter Schule. (dissertation) Universität Bremen. 2002.
