= Anna Haifisch =

German cartoonist and illustrator (born 1986)

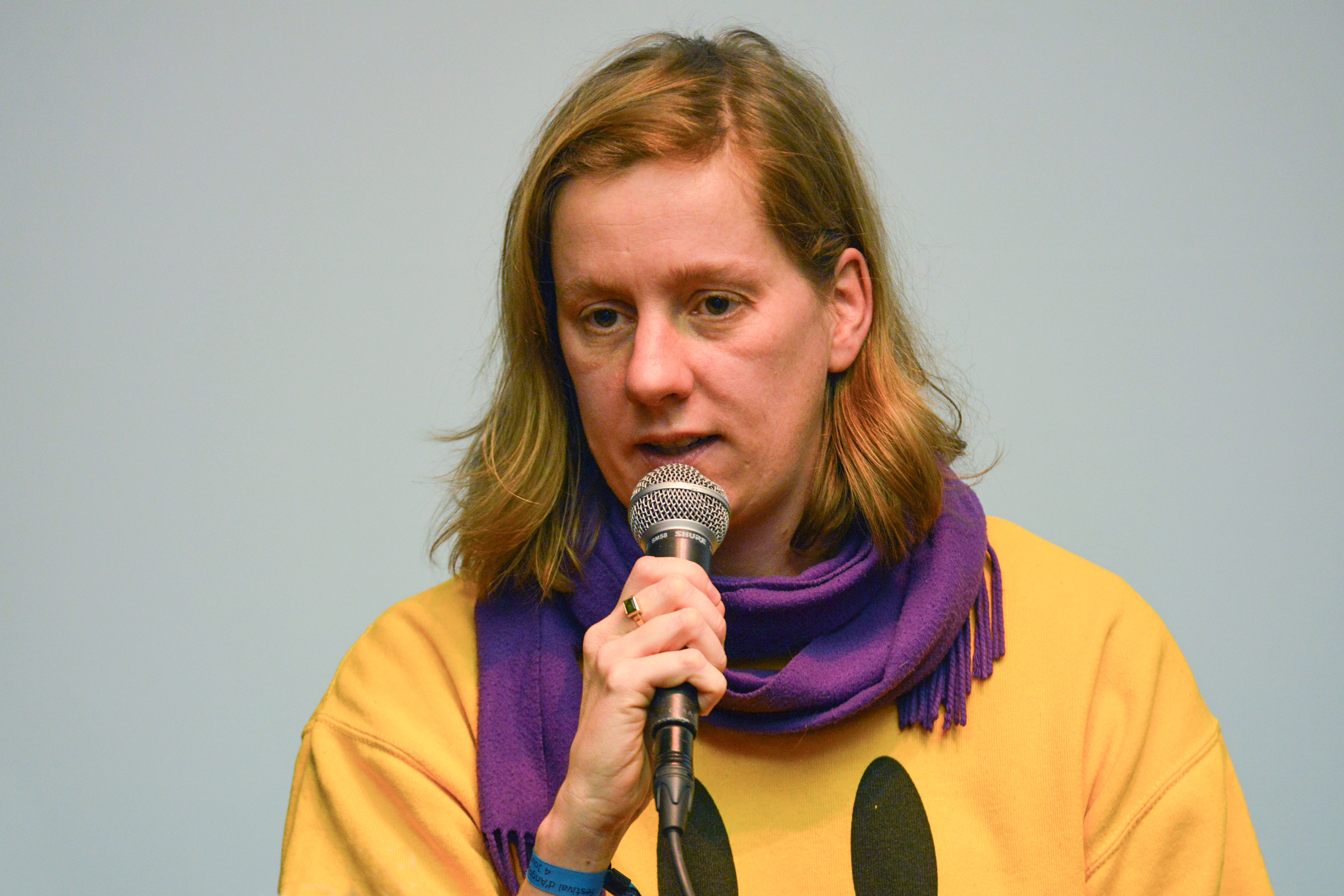
- Haifisch in 2019
- Born: 1986 (age 39–40); Leipzig, East Germany
- Education: Hochschule für Grafik und Buchkunst Leipzig
- Known for: cartoons; webcomics; illustrations
- Notable work: The Artist; Drawn to MoMA; Google Doodle
- Awards: Max und Moritz Award
- Website: Official website

Anna Haifisch (born 1986) is a German cartoonist and illustrator who has been working for German and international media. She is best known for her cartoons titled The Artist, first published by Vice magazine, her 2018 doodle for Google and her contribution to the series Drawn to MoMA of the New York Museum of Modern Art. Her work has received several awards and has been translated into English, French, Spanish and other languages.

== Life and career ==
Haifisch was born in Leipzig, East Germany. She studied graphic design and printmaking at the Academy of Fine Arts in Leipzig from 2004 to 2011. Still a student in 2008, she travelled to the US for the first time to improve her knowledge of printmaking technique, while working in a screen printing workshop in Brooklyn. Following this, she continued her postgraduate course at the same art school in Leipzig until 2015.

In 2013, with friends including James Turek and Max Baitinger, she founded the festival for comics and illustration The Millionaires Club, which has been organized in parallel to the Leipzig Book Fair. Her webcomic The Artist was published by Vice magazine as Today's comic between September 2015 and December 2016. This series of comics featured a conceited artist, changing between self-pity and overconfidence, who wants to make it in the world of art. As Haifisch commented, the story is not closely inspired by her own life, "but the protagonist does have a lot in common with me in terms of temperament." Episodes of The Artist have also been published as books since 2016.

In 2018, Haifisch was a featured guest artist at the MoCCA Arts Festival, Manhattan's largest independent comics, cartoon and animation festival. Celebrating International Women's Day 2018, Google chose Haifisch as one of 12 international graphic artists to design a doodle. In 2020, the New York Museum of Modern Art commissioned her work for their series Drawn to MoMA.

Haifisch, whose name means shark in German, often uses graphic versions of human-like "funny animals" as main characters of her stories. These animal figures are experiencing the absurdities of daily life. In particular, her bird-like character The Artist reflects the challenges of being an artist in an ironical way. Her work is further characterized by thin lines drawn with an ink pen and expressive yellow and orange colours. In her large-size book Drifter, she was said to "bend[...] the rules of comics." Her style has been described as a combination of "dark" melancholy and "silly" elements, influenced by the graphic styles and colours of past decades.

Having grown up and studied in Leipzig, an important cultural centre in the Eastern part of Germany, during the years following the fall of the Berlin Wall, Haifisch named Czech and Russian graphic art as influences. As a child, she was attracted to American culture, which included comics by Walt Disney and other elements of the American way of life. Her illustrations have appeared in German and international magazines and newspapers, including Die Zeit, The New Yorker, The New York Times, Bloomberg Businessweek, Le Monde diplomatique and others.

== Reception ==
Among other recognitions, The Artist was nominated for the 2017 Los Angeles Times Book Prize. In 2020, Haifisch was distinguished with the international Max-und-Moritz-Preis as Best Comic Artist in German language publications.

Apart from other group and solo exhibitions of her graphic art, the Museum für Kunst und Gewerbe in Hamburg presented around 300 works in 2024 as an overview of her artistic creations, including illustrations, prints, comics, drawings and products with her designs.

== Awards and recognition ==
- 2016: e.o.plauen Prize
- 2017: nominated for Los Angeles Times Book Prize
- 2018: Sondermann-Preis
- 2020: Max-und-Moritz-Preis as Best Comic Artist in German language
- 2021: Art Prize of the Leipziger Volkszeitung
- 2022: Grant by Villa Aurora, Pacific Palisades, USA

== Selected publications ==
- Von Spatz. Kassel: Rotopolpress, 2015, ISBN 978-3-940304-97-1.
- The Artist. Berlin: Reprodukt, 2016, ISBN 978-3-95640-032-2.
- The Artist. (French edition) Misma Editions, 2016, ISBN 978-2-916254-54-8
- The Artist – Der Schnabelprinz. Reprodukt, 2017, ISBN 978-3-95640-123-7.
- Drifter. Chicago: Perfectly Acceptable Press, 2017.
- The Artist 2 – Le cycle éternel. Misma Editions, 2018, ISBN 978-2-916254-66-1
- The Artist. The Circle of Life. Fantagraphics, 2019, ISBN 978-1-911081-07-4.
- Residenz Fahrenbühl. Leipzig: Spector Books, 2021, ISBN 978-3-95905-434-8.
- Schappi. (French edition) Misma Editions, 2021, ISBN 978-2-916254-87-6.
- Mouse in Residence (English edition), Leipzig: Spector Books, 2021, ISBN 9783959055031.
- Schappi (English edition), Fantagraphics, 2022, ISBN 9781683965268.
- Chez Schnabel (German / English), Leipzig: Spector Books, 2022, ISBN 9783959056038.
- Ready America (English edition), Fantagraphics, 2024, ISBN 9781683969426.

== Selected exhibitions ==
- 2024 Museum für Kunst und Gewerbe, Hamburg, Germany
- 2024 Souris au bec – Musée Tomi Ungerer – Centre international de L'Illustration, Strasbourg, France
- 2023 The Artist at Museum Folkwang, Essen, Germany
- 2022/23 HOMI, Kunsthalle Osnabrück, Germany
- 2018/2019 Fuji-san, Museumsquartier Vienna, Austria
- 2017 The Artist, Kunstsammlungen Chemnitz, Germany

== General and cited references ==
- Bongers, Helene L. (1 January 2024). "The Critique of the Modern Art Museum in Four Colors: Anna Haifisch's The Artist x MoMA". Source: Notes in the History of Art. 43 (2): 152–162. doi:10.1086/730295. ISSN 0737-4453.
- Kraenzle, Christina; Ludewig, Julia (2 January 2020). "Transnationalism in German comics". Journal of Graphic Novels and Comics. 11 (1): 1–9. doi:10.1080/21504857.2020.1718836. ISSN 2150-4857.
- Moster-Hoos, Jutta, Kristina Gerigk (2018). Die neunte Kunst. Aktuelle deutsche Graphic Novels. Hans Hillmann, Max Baitinger, Anke Feuchtenberger, Anna Haifisch, Jakob Hinrichs, Lukas Jüliger, Reinhard Kleist, Isabel Kreitz, Olivier Kugler, Ulli Lust, Felix Pestemer, Simon Schwartz, Birgit Weyhe, Barbara Yelin. Oldenburg, Germany: Horst-Janssen-Museum Oldenburg, ISBN 9783730814420.
