= Isabel Kreitz =

German cartoonist (born 1967)

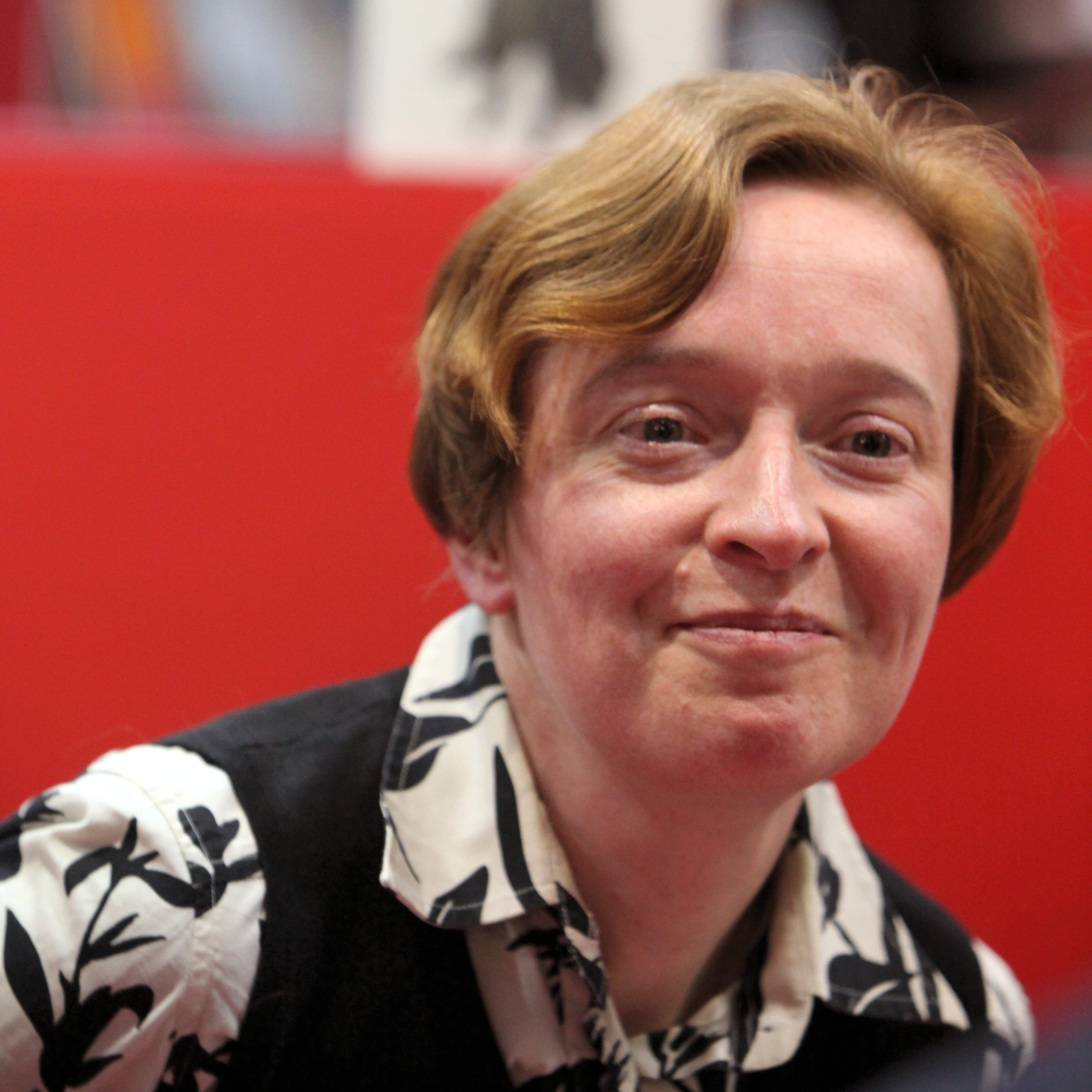
- Kreitz in 2011
- Born: 1967 (age 58–59); Hamburg
- Known for: Graphic novels, comics
- Notable work: Stalin's Spy in Tokyo
- Awards: Max und Moritz Award
- Website: Official website (in German)

Isabel Kreitz (born 1967 in Hamburg) is a German cartoonist. Her graphic novels have been published mainly in German, but also in English and other languages. She has received several notable awards, including the German Comic Prize, the Wilhelm Busch Prize and the prestigious German Max und Moritz Award. Further, she is considered as one of the most celebrated German artists working in comics and graphic novels.

== Life and career ==
Kreitz studied Visual Design at the precursor of the Hamburg University of Applied Sciences and spent one semester at the Parsons School in New York. There, she saw how graphic novels were made in a professional way. As of 2021, Kreitz was one among estimated 500 full-time cartoonists in Germany, where graphic novels usually are only printed in 5000 copies.

After having published several cartoons and graphic novels since 1994, her first major success was a 2008 graphic novel about the German spy Richard Sorge titled Die Sache mit Sorge, later published in English as Stalin's Spy in Tokyo. Richard Sorge was a German journalist and Soviet military intelligence officer who was active before and during World War II and worked undercover as a German journalist in both Nazi Germany and the Empire of Japan. Kreitz drew Sorge's covert activities in Japan between 1933 and 1944 in black-and-white, expressionist images, hiding the future political events. Subsequently, the novel was translated into English, French and Spanish.

In 2011 she published a graphic novel with the title Deutschland. Ein Bilderbuch (Germany, a picture book). For this work, she chose one important event from almost every year in the history of the German Federal Republic. The first event was the return from exile of German writer Thomas Mann in 1949, and the last dealt with the financial crisis following the crash of Lehman Brothers Bank in 2008. Other works by Kreitz have been graphic novels based on books for young adults by German authors Erich Kästner and Uwe Timm.

In the 2020 book about German-East Asian Encounters and Entanglements: Affinity in Culture and Politics, Kreitz has been called "one of the most celebrated German artists working in comics and graphic novels."

== Awards and distinctions ==
- 1997: First German Comic Prize as best cartoonist in German language
- 2008: Max und Moritz Award in the category for children and young adults
- 2008: Sondermann Award for Die Sache mit Sorge
- 2011: Sondermann Award for Haarmann
- 2012: Max-und-Moritz-Preis as best artist in German language
- 2019: Wilhelm Busch Prize
- 2023: e.o.plauen Award

== Selected works ==
- 2008: Die Sache mit Sorge – Stalins Spion in Tokio, Carlsen Verlag, mit einer Dokumentation von Frank Giese, ISBN 978-3-551-78743-9.
  - English translation: Kreitz, Isabel (2012). Stalin's Spy in Tokyo. Blank Slate Books. ISBN 978-1-906653-20-0.
  - French translation: L'Espion de Staline, translated by Paul Derouet. Brussels: Casterman, ISBN 9782203029637.
  - Spanish translation: El Caso Sorge: Un Espía de Stalin En Tokio. Barcelona: La Cúpula, ISBN 9788416400485.
- 2009: Pünktchen und Anton, Cecilie Dressler Verlag, ISBN 978-3-7915-1160-3.
- 2010: Haarmann, Carlsen Verlag, ISBN 978-3-551-79107-8.
  - French translation: Haarmann, Le Boucher de Hanovre. Translated by Carline Dolmazon and Paul Derouet. Nouvelle édition. Bruxelles: Casterman, ISBN 9782203056787.
  - Spanish translation: Haarmann: El Carnicero de Hannover. Un Asesino en Serie. Translated by María Dolores Pérez Pablos. Barcelona: Ediciones La Cúpula, ISBN 9788418809224.
- 2011: Deutschland. Ein Bilderbuch, DuMont Verlag, ISBN 978-3-8321-9621-9;
- 2012: Emil und die Detektive, Cecilie Dressler Verlag, ISBN 978-3-7915-1168-9.
- 2015: Rohrkrepierer, Carlsen Verlag, ISBN 978-3-551-78378-3.
- 2016: Das doppelte Lottchen, Cecilie Dressler Verlag, ISBN 978-3-7915-1171-9.
- 2018: Minzi Monster in der Schule. Text: Friedbert Stohner. Illustrationen: Isabel Kreitz, dtv, München 2018, ISBN 978-3-423-64040-4.

== See also ==
- Non-fiction comics
- German comics
- List of German comic books
- List of German comic creators

== Literature ==
- Kavaloski, Joshua (2015). "The Haarmann Case: Remapping the Weimar Republic". The German Quarterly. 88 (2): 219–241. doi:10.1111/gequ.10235. ISSN 0016-8831.
- Moster-Hoos, Jutta, Kristina Gerigk, Horst-Janssen, Museum Oldenburg. Die neunte Kunst. Aktuelle deutsche Graphic Novels. Hans Hillmann, Max Baitinger, Anke Feuchtenberger, Anna Haifisch, Jakob Hinrichs, Lukas Jüliger, Reinhard Kleist, Isabel Kreitz, Olivier Kugler, Ulli Lust, Felix Pestemer, Simon Schwartz, Birgit Weyhe, Barbara Yelin. Oldenburg: Isensee, ISBN 9783730814420.
