= Sondermann =

Cartoon character created by Bernd Pfarr in Germany

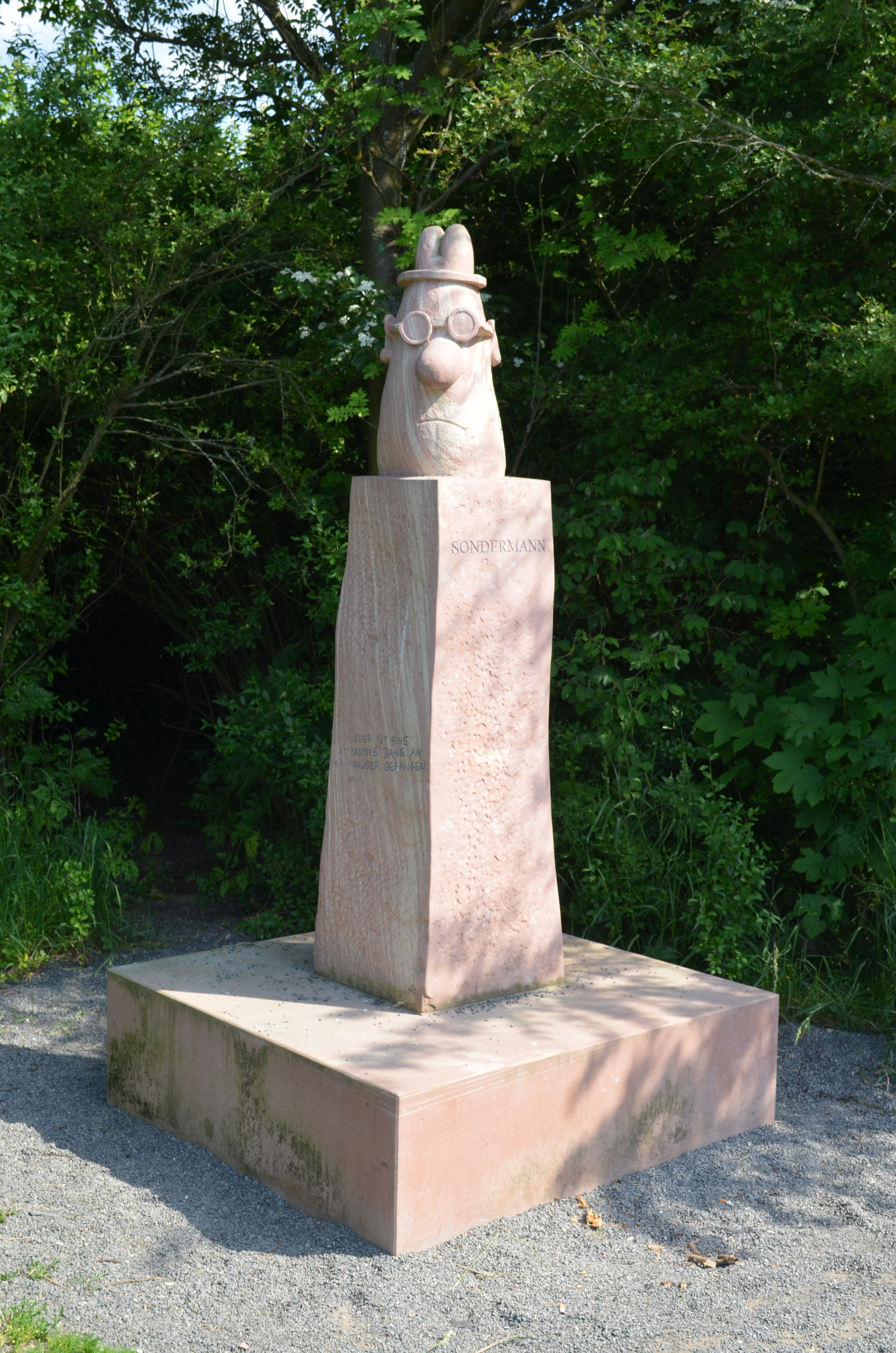
Monument to the character

Sondermann is a cartoon character of the painter and cartoonist Bernd Pfarr, which appeared, until August 1994, in a column of the same name by the writer Simone Borowiak and, from 1987 to August 2004, regularly in the satirical magazine Titanic. Model for the name was Gerhard Sondermann, the first publisher of Titanic.

Sondermann is a creation of an illustrator, who, as Bernd Pfarr himself once said, wants "to drive reality out of the pictures" (German: "den Bildern die Realität austreiben").

== The comic ==
The world of Sondermann is subject to its own, individual laws: "Negro scrubbing" (German: "Negerschrubben") is a traditional ritual at Sondermann's company, Sondermann and his boss subdue their hunger by "huddling softly together" (German: "sich weich aneinander schmiegen"), consuming a Schnitzel and taking out the trash are common yoga exercises, and Sondermann defeats God (German: "den lieben Gott") in Tennis.

Sondermann's world is populated by strange creatures:

- a neighbor, Schulze, who often "comes to detonate" (German: "zum Sprengen kommt");
- God, as mentioned above;
- the blowdryer-armed super hero Supererpel, who is not actually that heroic;
- the brothers Strittmatter, also neighbors of Sondermann, who are penguins and "detonate saurians in their spare time" (German: "in ihrer Freizeit Saurier sprengen");
- Mr. Sharp, "lord over seven flies" (German: "Herr über sieben Fliegen"), who is for inexplicable reasons unbeloved by Sondermann, and is also a penguin and the "latest stallion" (German: "neuester Stecher") of Sondermann's mother;
- Herr Detlev Siehlbeck, who always carries a dead fish with him and expects that people pet it;
- a small dog named Willi, whose "freethinking remarks about the preparation of his food" (German: "freigeistige Ausführungen der Zubereitung seines Fresschens betreffend") impress the Weltgeist so much that they cause metaphysical levitation in it;
- and not least Sondermann himself: accountant, single and eager to learn, with a pronounced artistic side, while not insusceptible to erotic or homoerotic attraction.

Early Sondermann episodes mostly limited themselves to the master-servant relationship between Sondermann and his boss. The pandemonium of the above-listed characters grew gradually out of this fundamental conflict. According to writer Robert Gernhardt, the character very soon developed a "life of its own" (German: "Eigenleben"), for which even the editorial staff of Titanic was not prepared.

== Sondermann Award ==
Since 2004, the name of Bernd Pfarr's character also denotes an audience prize for comics awarded by and at the Frankfurt Book Fair in collaboration with the magazine Comixene, the Frankfurter Rundschau, and Spiegel Online. Some of the prizes include a cash sum.

=== Recipients 2004 ===
- International comic: Asterix and the Class Act by Albert Uderzo and René Goscinny
- Domestic comic: Nichtlustig 2 by Joscha Sauer
- International manga/manhwa: Angel Sanctuary by Kaori Yuki
- Domestic manga: Without Identity by Sascha Schätzchen
- Newcomer 2004: Joscha Sauer (Nichtlustig 2)

=== Recipients 2005 ===
- International comic: Onkel Dagobert by Don Rosa
- Domestic comic: Die Chronik der Unsterblichen by Wolfgang Hohlbein, Benjamin von Eckartsberg and Thomas von Kummant
- International manga/manhwa: One Piece by Eiichiro Oda
- Domestic manga: Dystopia by Judith Park
- Cartoon: Shit happens! by Ralph Ruthe
- Newcomer 2005: Arne Bellstorf (Acht, neun, zehn)
- Bernd-Pfarr-special-prize for comical art: Rudi Hurzlmeier

=== Recipients 2006 ===
- International comic: Sin City by Frank Miller
- Domestic comic: Adolf – der Bonker by Walter Moers
- International manga/manhwa: Shinshi Doumei Cross by Arina Tanemura
- Domestic manga: Jibun-Jishin by Nina Werner
- Cartoon: Shit happens! by Ralph Ruthe
- Newcomer 2006: Moki (Asleep in a foreign place)
- Bernd-Pfarr-special-prize for comical art: Greser & Lenz

=== Recipients 2007 ===
- International comic: Calvin & Hobbes by Bill Watterson
- Domestic comic: Cash – I see a darkness by Reinhard Kleist
- International manga/manhwa: Death Note by Takeshi Obata and Tsugumi Ōba
- Domestic manga: Gothic Sports by Anike Hage
- Cartoon: Shit happens! by Ralph Ruthe
- Newcomer 2007: Dirk Schwieger
- Bernd-Pfarr-special-prize for comical art: Rattelschneck (Stulli, das Pausenbrot)

=== Recipients 2008 ===
- International comic: Prinz Eisenherz by Hal Foster
- Domestic comic: Die Sache mit Sorge by Isabel Kreitz
- International manga/manhwa: Volume 44 of One Piece by Eiichiro Oda
- Domestic manga: Stupid Story 1 by Anna Hollmann
- Cartoon: Shit happens! by Ralph Ruthe
- Newcomer 2008: Barbara Yelin
- Bernd-Pfarr-special-prize for comical art: Stephan Rürup

=== Recipients 2009 ===
- International comic: Der Dunkle Turm by Jae Lee et al. (illustration), Peter David and Robin Furth (text), based on The Dark Tower by Stephen King
- Domestic comic: Prototyp by Ralf König
- International manga/manhwa: Volume 48 of One Piece by Eiichiro Oda
- Domestic manga: Stupid Story 2 by Anna Hollmann
- Cartoon: Nichtlustig 4 by Joscha Sauer
- Newcomer 2009: Michael Meier
- Bernd-Pfarr-special-prize for comical art: Kamagurka

=== Recipients 2010 ===
- Comic: Asterix and Obelix's Birthday by René Goscinny and Albert Uderzo, Egmont Ehapa
- Manga/Manhwa: Legend of Zelda 1 by Akira Himekawa, Tokyopop
- Cartoon: Das schwarze Buch by Uli Stein, Lappan
- Webcomic (endowed with 1,000 Euro): Beetlebum by Johannes Kretzschmar.
- Newcomer 2010: Felix Mertikat and Benjamin Schreuder (Jakob)
- Bernd-Pfarr-special-prize for comical art: Ari Plikat

=== Recipients 2011 ===
- Comic international: Das Leben von Anne Frank von Ernie Colón (drawings) and Sid Jacobson (text), Carlsen
- Domestic comic (national): Haarmann von Isabel Kreitz (drawings) and Peer Meter (text), Carlsen
- Manga international: Fairy Tail, 4th part, by Hiro Mashima, Carlsen
- Domestic manga (national): Die Wolke by Anike Hage, after Die Wolke von Gudrun Pausewang, Tokyopop
- Webcomic (endowed with 1,000 Euro): Entoman von David Füleki
- Newcomer 2011: Asja Wiegand
- Bernd-Pfarr-special-prize for comical art: Eugen Egner

=== Recipients 2012 ===
- Comic international: Habibi von Craig Thompson, Reprodukt
- Domestic comic (national): Steam Noir von Felix Mertikat (drawings) und Benjamin Schreuder (text), Cross Cult
- Manga international: Pretty Guardian Sailor Moon von Naoko Takeuchi, EMA
- Domestic manga (national): Stupid Story 3 von Anna Hollmann, Tokyopop
- Webcomic (endowed with 1,000 Euro): Das Leben ist kein Ponyhof von Sarah Burrini
- Newcomer 2012: Aisha Franz
- Bernd-Pfarr-special-prize for comical art: Christoph Niemann

=== Recipients 2013 ===
- Bernd-Pfarr-special-prize for comical art: Hilke Raddatz
- Sponsorship award: Katharina Greve

=== Recipients 2014 ===
- Bernd-Pfarr-special-prize for comical art: Ernst Kahl
- Sponsorship award: Sebastian Lörscher
- Scholarship: Leonard Riegel

=== Recipients 2015 ===
- Bernd-Pfarr-special-prize for comical art: Michael Sowa
- Sponsorship award: Leonard Riegel
- Scholarship: Ella Carina Werner

=== Recipients 2016 ===
- Bernd-Pfarr-special-prize for comical art: Thomas Kapielski
- Sponsorship award: Jan Böhmermann
- Scholarship: Fabian Lichter

=== Recipients 2017 ===
- Sondermann-Preis für Komische Kunst: Hans Traxler
- Sponsorship award: Kathrin Fricke
- Scholarship: Daniel Sibbe

=== Recipients 2018 ===
- Sondermann-Preis für Komische Kunst: Otto Waalkes for life work
- Sponsorship award: Anna Haifisch
- Scholarship: Paula Irmschler

=== Recipients 2019 ===
- Sondermann-Preis für Komische Kunst: Nicolas Mahler for his comics based on masterpieces of world literature
- Sponsorship award: Stefanie Sargnagel
- Scholarship: Adrian Schulz
