= Max und Moritz Award =

Comics awards

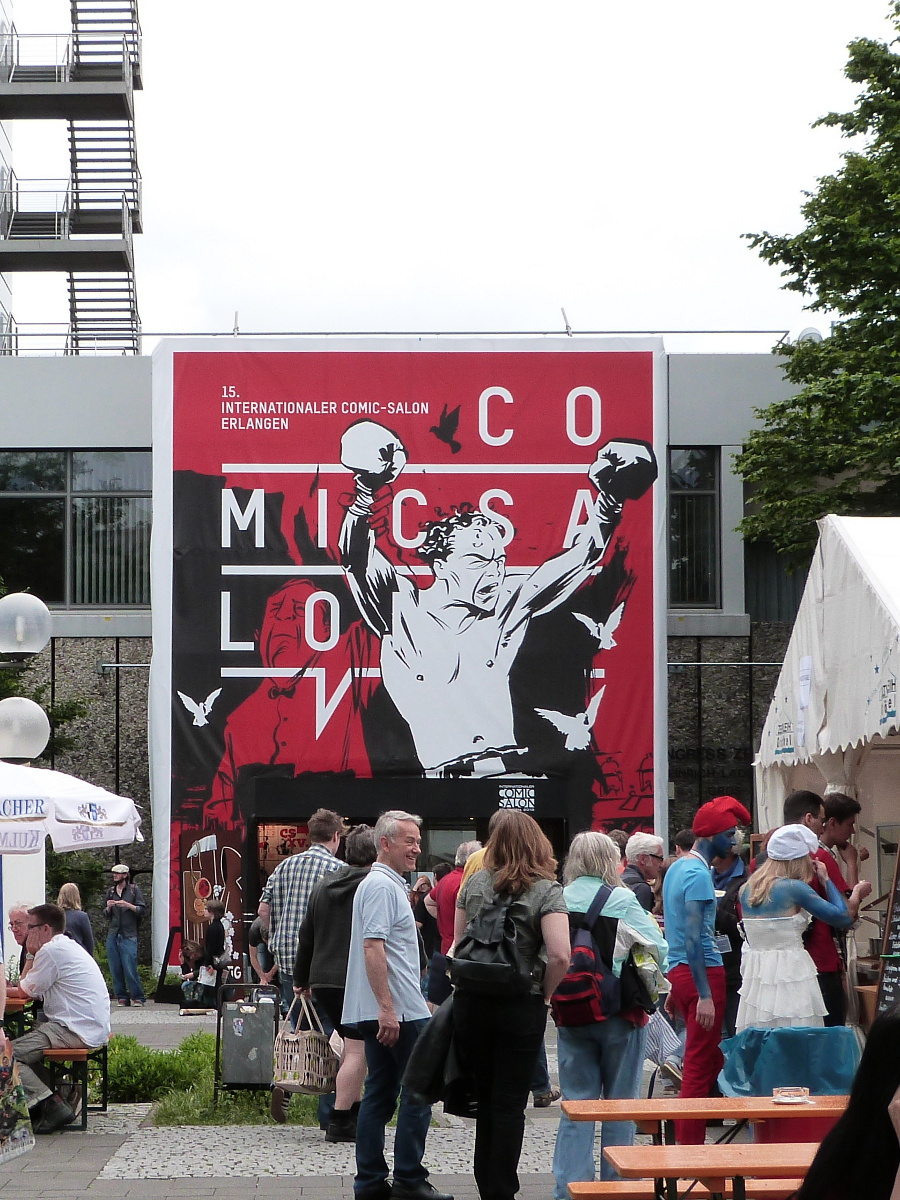
Comic event in Erlangen

The Max und Moritz Award (German: Max-und-Moritz-Preis), also known as the Max & Moritz Prize, is a prize for comic books, comic strips, and other similar materials. It has been awarded at each of the biennial International Comics Shows of Erlangen since 1984, and is awarded in several categories, including an audience award and lifetime achievement award. It is open to all material published in Germany.

== 1984 ==
- Best German-language Comic Artist: Chris Scheuer
- Best Comic Strip: Hägar the Horrible, by Dik Browne
- Best German-language Comic/Comic-related Publication: Edition Comic Art (series) (Carlsen Verlag)

== 1986 ==
- Best German-language Comic Artist: Matthias Schultheiss
- Best Comic Strip: Animal Crackers by Rog Bollen
- Best German-language Comic/Comic-related Publication:
  - Macao - Internationale Comics (Macao Books, Wuppertal)
  - Strapazin Comic Art Magazine (Zürich, Munich)
  - Coeurs de sable, by Jacques de Loustal & Philippe Paringaux (Schreiber & Leser)
  - Peter and the Wolf, by Jörg Müller & Loriot (Verlag Sauerländer)

== 1988 ==
- Best German-language Comic Artist: Franziska Becker
- Best Comic Strip: Mafalda, by Quino
- Best German-language Comic/Comic-related Publication: A la recherche de Peter Pan, by Cosey (Carlsen Verlag)

== 1990 ==
- Best German-language Comic Artist: Gerhard Seyfried
- Best Comic Strip: Calvin and Hobbes, by Bill Watterson
- Best German-language Comic/Comic-related Publication:
  - Quotidiania delirante, by Miguelanxo Prado (Egmont Ehapa)
  - Watchmen, by Alan Moore & Dave Gibbons (Carlsen Verlag)
  - Volumes of Tardi's work (Edition Moderne)
  - Boxer Comic Art Magazine (Edition Kunst der Comics)
- Special Prize: Art Spiegelman, for Maus

== 1992 ==
- Best German-language Comic Artist: Ralf König
- Best Comic Strip: B.C., by Johnny Hart
- Best German-language Comic/Comic-related Publication:
  - Peter Pan, by Régis Loisel (Egmont Ehapa)
  - Théodore Poussin, by Frank Le Gall (Carlsen Verlag)
  - Les pionniers de l'aventure humaine, by François Boucq (Alpha-Comic Verlag)
  - Die Bibliothek der großen Comic-Klassiker (series) (Carlsen Verlag)
  - Fires, by Lorenzo Mattotti (Edition Kunst der Comics)
- Special Prize for outstanding lifetime achievement: Alberto Breccia

== 1993 (in Hamburg) ==
- Best German-language Comic Artist: Walter Moers
- Best Comic Strip or Cartoon Series: The Far Side, by Gary Larson
- Best German-language Comic/Comic-related Publication:
  - Domestic: Es ist ein Arschloch, Maria!, by Walter Moers (Eichborn Verlag)
  - Import: L'Uomo alla Finestra, by Lorenzo Mattotti & Lilia Ambrosi (Edition Kunst der Comics)
  - Humor: Myrtil Fauvette, by Riff Reb's (Feest Comics)
  - For Children and Young People: Jimmy Boy, by Dominique David (Carlsen Verlag)
  - Publication About Comics: Entretiens avec Moebius, by Numa Sadoul (Carlsen Verlag)
  - Self-published Comic: Artige Zeiten, by Andreas Michalke
- Special Prize for outstanding lifetime achievement: Carl Barks

== 1994 ==
- Best German-language Comic Artist: Hendrik Dorgathen
- Best Comic Strip or Cartoon Series: Captain Star, by Steven Appleby
- Best German-language Comic/Comic-related Publication:
  - Domestic: Der unschuldige Passagier, by Martin tom Dieck (Arbeitskreis Stadtzeichner Alsfeld)
  - Import: Foligatto, by Nicolas de Crécy & Alexios Tjoyas (Egmont Ehapa)
  - Import: Jeux pour mourir, by Jacques Tardi (Edition Moderne)
  - Import: Red Road, by Derib (Carlsen Verlag)
  - For Children and Young People: Full Moon Soup, by Alastair Graham (Bertelsmann Verlag)
- Best International Writer: Jean van Hamme
- Special Prize of the Jury: Mecki - Einer für alle, by Eckart Sackmann (comicplus+)
- Special Prize for outstanding lifetime achievement: Will Eisner

== 1996 ==
- Best German-language Comic Artist: Thomas Ott
- Best Comic Strip or Cartoon Series: Mutts, by Patrick McDonnell
- Best German-language Comic/Comic-related Publication:
  - Domestic: Lovecraft, by Reinhard Kleist & Roland Hüve (Egmont Ehapa)
  - Import: Saint-Exupéry - le dernier vol, by Hugo Pratt (Egmont Ehapa)
  - Import: Zoo, by Frank Pé & Philippe Bonifay (Splitter Verlag)
  - for Children and Young People: John Chatterton détective, by Yvan Pommaux (Moritz Verlag)
  - Publication About Comics: 100 Jahre Comic Strips, by Bill Blackbeard, et al. (Carlsen Verlag)
- Best International Writer: Pierre Christin
- Special Prize of the Jury: Dietmar Hahlweg, prior mayor of the city of Erlangen
- Special Prize for outstanding lifetime achievement: André Franquin

== 1998 ==
- Best German-language Comic Artist: Bernd Pfarr
- Best Comic Strip or Cartoon Series: Dilbert, by Scott Adams
- Best German-language Comic/Comic-related Publication:
  - Domestic: Wüttner, by Haimo Kinzler (Zwerchfell Verlag)
  - Import: City of Glass, by David Mazzucchelli & Paul Karasik (Rowohlt Verlag)
  - for Children and Young People: Illustrierte Kinderklassiker (series) (Egmont Ehapa)
- Best International Writer: Neil Gaiman
- Special Prize of the Jury: Le Guide des cités, by François Schuiten & Benoît Peeters (Egmont Ehapa)
- Special Prize for outstanding lifetime achievement: Robert Crumb

== 2000 ==
- Best German-language Comic Artist: Martin tom Dieck
- Best Comic Strip or Cartoon Series:
  - International: Zits, by Jerry Scott and Jim Borgman
  - Domestic: Touché, by ©TOM
- Best German-language Comic/Comic-related Publication:
  - Domestic: Geteilter Traum, by Daniel Bosshart (Edition Moderne)
  - Import: Approximate Continuum Comics, by Lewis Trondheim (Reprodukt)
  - for Children and Young People: The Wind in the Willows, by Michel Plessix (Carlsen Verlag)
  - Publication About Comics: Die deutschsprachige Comic-Fachpresse, by Eckart Sackmann (comicplus+)
- Best International Writer: Alan Moore
- Special Prize of the Jury: The Long and Unlearned Life of Roland Gethers, by Shane Simmons (MaroVerlag)
- Special Prize for outstanding lifetime achievement: Moebius/Jean Giraud

== 2002 ==
- Best German-language Comic Artist: Peter Puck
- Best Comic Strip or Cartoon Series:
  - International: Liberty Meadows, by Frank Cho
  - Domestic: Perscheids Abgründe, by Martin Perscheid
- Best German-language Comic/Comic-related Publication:
  - Domestic: Moga Mobo - 100 Meisterwerke der Weltliteratur
  - Import: Lost Girl, by Nabiel Kanan (Lost Comix)
  - For Children: Doktor Dodo schreibt ein Buch, by Ole Könnecke (Carlsen Verlag)
  - For Young People: Come la vita - Cuori imbranati, by Carlos Trillo & Laura Scarpa (Edition Schwarzer Klecks)
  - Publication About Comics: Lexikon der Comics, by Marcus Czerwionka (ed.) (Corian-Verlag)
- Best International Writer: Frank Giroud
- Special Prize of the Jury: Karl Manfred Fischer, creator & director of the Erlangen Comics Show
- Special Prize for outstanding lifetime achievement: José Muñoz

== 2004 ==
- Best German-language Comic Artist: Ulf K.
- Best Comic Strip: Strizz, by Volker Reiche
- Best German-language Comic/Comic-related Publication:
  - Domestic: Held, by Flix (Carlsen Verlag)
  - Domestic: Leviathan, by Jens Harder (Éditions de l'An 2)
  - Import: Persepolis, by Marjane Satrapi (Edition Moderne)
  - For Children and Young People: W.I.T.C.H., by Elisabetta Gnone, Alessandro Barbucci, Barbara Canepa, et al. (Egmont Ehapa)
- Best International Writer: Joann Sfar
- Special Prize of the Jury: 36 vues de la Tour Eiffel, by André Juillard (Salleck Publications)
- Special Prize for outstanding lifetime achievement: Albert Uderzo

== 2006 ==
- Best German-language Comic Artist: Volker Reiche
- Best Comic Strip: Doonesbury, by Garry Trudeau
- Best German-language Comic/Comic-related Publication:
  - Domestic: Das Unbehagen, by Nicolas Mahler (Edition Moderne)
  - Import: Gli Innocenti, by Gipi (avant-verlag)
  - Manga: Barefoot Gen, by Keiji Nakazawa (Carlsen Verlag)
  - For Children and Young People: Jónas Blondal, by Jens F. Ehrenreich (Epsilon Verlag)
- Best International Writer: Max Goldt
- Special Prize of the Jury: Ralf König, for his cartoons and commitment to the conflict revolving around the Danish Mohammed cartoons.
- Special Prize for outstanding lifetime achievement: Jacques Tardi

== 2008 ==
- Best German-language Comic Artist: Anke Feuchtenberger
- Best Comic Strip: Flaschko – Der Mann in der Heizdecke, by Nicolas Mahler
- Best German-language Comic/Comic-related Publication:
  - Domestic: Cash – I see a darkness, by Reinhard Kleist (Carlsen Verlag)
  - Import: Epileptic, by David B. (Edition Moderne)
  - Manga: A Distant Neighborhood, by Jiro Taniguchi (Carlsen Verlag)
  - For Children and Young People: Der 35. Mai, by Isabel Kreitz (Dressler Verlag)
  - Art school project: Plusplus
- Best International Writer: Olivier Ka
- Special Prizes of the Jury:
  - Hannes Hegen
  - Hansrudi Wäscher
- Special Prize for outstanding lifetime achievement: Alan Moore

== 2010 ==
- Best German-language Comic Artist: Nicolas Mahler
- Best Comic Strip: Prototyp and Archetyp, by Ralf König
- Best German-language Comic/Comic-related Publication:
  - Domestic: Alpha. Directions, by Jens Harder (Carlsen Verlag)
  - Import: Pinocchio, by Winshluss (avant-verlag)
  - For Children and Young People: Such dir was aus, aber beeil dich, by Nadia Budde (S. Fischer Verlag)
  - Art school project: Strichnin
  - Prize Awarded by the Audience: Today is the Last Day of the Rest of Your Life, by Ulli Lust (avant-verlag)
- Special Prize of the Jury: German Edition of Will Eisner's A Contract with God (Carlsen Verlag) and The Spirit (Salleck Publications)
- Special Prize for outstanding lifetime achievement: Pierre Christin

== 2012 ==
- Best German-language Comic Artist: Isabel Kreitz
- Best Comic Strip: Schöne Töchter, by Flix
- Best German-language Comic/Comic-related Publication:
  - Domestic: Packeis, by Simon Schwartz (avant-verlag)
  - Import: Footnotes in Gaza, by Joe Sacco (Edition Moderne)
  - For Children and Young People: Boucle d'or et les Sept Ours nains, by Émile Bravo (Carlsen Verlag)
  - Art school project: Ampel Magazin
  - Prize Awarded by the Audience: Grablicht, by Daniela Winkler (Droemer Knaur)
- Special Prize of the Jury: Rossi Schreiber (Schreiber & Leser)
- Special Prize for outstanding lifetime achievement: Lorenzo Mattotti

== 2014 ==
- Best German-language Comic Artist: Ulli Lust
- Best Comic Strip: Totes Meer, by 18 Metzger
- Best German-language Comic/Comic-related Publication:
  - Domestic: Kinderland, by Mawil (Reprodukt)
  - Import: Billy Bat, by Naoki Urasawa & Takashi Nagasaki (Carlsen Verlag)
  - For Children and Young People: Hilda and the Midnight Giant, by Luke Pearson (Reprodukt)
  - Art school project: Triebwerk
  - Prize Awarded by the Audience: Schisslaweng, by Marvin Clifford
- Special Prize of the Jury: Tina Hohl and Heinrich Anders, for the German translation of Jimmy Corrigan, the Smartest Kid on Earth (Reprodukt)
- Special Prize for outstanding lifetime achievement: Ralf König

== 2016 ==
- Best German-language Comic Artist: Barbara Yelin
- Best Comic Strip: Das Hochhaus, by Katharina Greve
- Best German-language Comic/Comic-related Publication:
  - Domestic: Madgermanes, by Birgit Weyhe (avant-verlag)
  - Import: This One Summer, by Jillian Tamaki & Mariko Tamaki (Reprodukt)
  - For Children and Young People: Kiste, by Uwe Heidschötter & Patrick Wirbeleit (Reprodukt)
  - Art school project: Wunderfitz
  - Prize Awarded by the Audience: Crash 'n' Burn, by Mikiko Ponczeck (Tokyopop)
- Special Prize of the Jury: avant-verlag
- Special Prize of the Jury: Luz, for Catharsis (S. Fischer Verlag)
- Special Prize for outstanding lifetime achievement: Claire Bretécher

== 2018 ==
- Best German-language Comic Artist: Reinhard Kleist
- Best Comic Strip: Das Leben ist kein Ponyhof by Sarah Burrini
- Best German-language Comic/Comic-related Publication:
  - Domestic: Wie ich versuchte, ein guter Mensch zu sein by Ulli Lust, Suhrkamp Verlag
  - Import: Esthers Tagebücher (Esther's notebooks) by Riad Sattouf, Reprodukt
  - For Children and Young People: Die drei ??? – Das Dorf der Teufel (comic book adaptation of the Three Investigators) by Ivar Leon Menger, John Beckmann and Christopher Tauber, Kosmos publishers
  - Art school project: Paradies curated by Jonathan Kunz (Hochschule der Bildenden Künste Saar)
  - Prize Awarded by the Audience: NiGuNeGu by Oliver Mielke and Hannes Radke, Pyramond
- Special Prize of the Jury: Paul Derouet
- Special Prize for outstanding lifetime achievement: Jean-Claude Mézières

== 2022 ==
- Best German-language Comic Artist: Birgit Weyhe
- Lifetime Achievement Award: Naoki Urasawa
