= Mikiko Ponczeck =

German-Japanese comic book artist

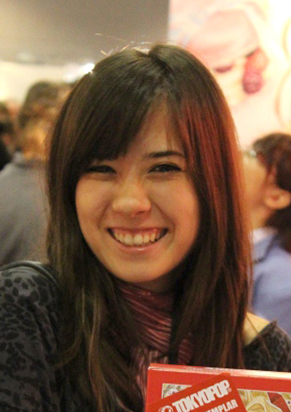
- Ponczeck at the Frankfurt Bookfair 2011.
- Born: 2 February 1984 (age 42)
- Occupations: Comics artist, Manga artist
- Website: https://mikiko.art/

Mikiko Ponczeck (born February 2, 1984, in Tokyo) is a German-Japanese comic book and manga artist.

== Early life ==
Due to her father's line of work, Ponczeck has moved a lot in her childhood, which resulted in her growing up learning many languages and living in places such as Hong Kong and Brussels. She is fluent in German, English, Japanese and French.
In 1999 she moved to Germany, where she finished school.
Until August 2016 she lived in Düsseldorf, Germany. Currently she lives and works in London, United Kingdom.

== Career ==
In August 2007, Ponczeck published her first graphic novel Lost and Found at an indie publisher called The Wild Side. This, as well as her following artbook was released under her early online handle, Zombiesmile.
Ponczeck was hired as a graphic designer at the Wild Side Publishing for a few years, where she was learned graphic design for packaging and lettering. She also translated English manga into German. At the release of her artbook BLUE, she gave a detailed interview to the Koneko magazine (issue 33, July/August 2009).
In 2010 she was approached by the German branch of Tokyopop, to participate in an anthology project as an hommage to the Grimm's Manga series, which has been published in July 2011. With her contribution of King Thrushbeard her work is published alongside famous German comic artists such as Anike Hage (Gothic Sports), Anna Hollmann, Inga Steinmetz, Nina Werner and Reyhan Yildirim. Early 2010, she was active as an online tutor for the Comicademy for their 'Scribble Club' course. In the same year she was hired as a colorist for Rombies, a comic written by Tom Taylor and illustrated by Skye Ogden, for Gestalt Publishing. Shortly after she also illustrated M.I.D.A.S. in collaboration with Taylor (writer) and Justin Randall (cover) which was finally released in 2016.
Throughout her freelancing years she has contributed various work for Subway (franchise), Animexx (German anime community), and Fireangels Publishing.

In 2011, she participated in a charity-auction organised by the German branch of Tokyopop to raise money for the 2011 Tōhoku earthquake and tsunami victims. At the end of the year, she was featured in an episode of Aufgezeichnet.tv, reviewing manga and graphic novels for the first time, and is now working as a presenter and reviewer on a regular basis for their online channel.

In July 2012, her profile on deviantArt reached one million pageviews. Grimms Manga Sonderband won the AnimaniA Award for Best National Manga in the same month, while her debut Lost And Found came in second.

Starting in February 2013, she hosted an online livestream show called J-MAG, which airs biweekly on MyVideo, a German video portal similar to YouTube. The show revolves around Anime, Manga, Japanese culture and popculture.

In 2015 she worked for Nintendo, providing cover artwork for the EU release of Fossil Fighters: Frontier and Teddy Together in 2016.

2016 in may, she was invited to the German educational children's show Tigerenten Club along with popsinger Jamie-Lee Kriewitz for a guest appearance, soon after she won the prestigious German Max & Moritz Prize for her comic Crash'n'Burn.

2018 Ponczeck's short story 'Crimson' appeared in the anthology Traces of the Great War alongside Bryan Talbot, Mary Talbot, Ian Rankin, Dave McKean, Charlie Adlard, Juan Díaz Canales, Victoria Lomasko and more international artists. This project was released in October in both the UK and France, for the centenary of the First World War to remember the impact it has had across cultures and borders to this day.

In the same year she began working for Adobe on social media as a promoter and regularly appears on stage at comic shows such as MCM London and Leipzig book fair.

== Work ==
- Lost and Found, 2007 August / The Wild Side / ISBN 978-3-939484-04-2
- Manga-Mixx 5, 2008 / Animexx (Coverillustration)
- BLUE (Artbook), 2009 September / The Wild Side / ISBN 978-3-939484-14-1
- Grimms Manga Sonderband, 2011 July / Tokyopop / ISBN 978-3-8420-0236-4
- Rombies, 2011 / Gestalt Publishing
- Lost and Found, 2011 September/ Tokyopop / ISBN 978-3-8420-0341-5
- BLUE (Artbook), 2011 Oktober/ Tokyopop / ISBN 978-3-8420-0343-9
- Grimms Manga Sonderband - Perfect Edition, 2013 January / Tokyopop / ISBN 978-3-8420-0638-6
- Crash 'n' Burn, 2 volumes, 2014 / Tokyopop / ISBN 978-3-8420-0524-2 / ISBN 978-3-8420-0523-5
- Scars, 2015 November/ Pyramond / ISBN 978-3-945943-03-8
- miki's mini comics, May 2017/ Pyramond/ ISBN 9783945943168
- Traces of the Great War, November 2018/ Image Comics/ ISBN 1534311505
