= Turba =

Turba is a surname. Notable people with the surname include:

- Ctibor Turba (1944–2025), Czech actor
- David Turba (born 1982), German voice actor
- Giovanni Turba (1905–1994), Italian sprinter
- Wilfrid J. Turba (1928–2005), American politician

== See also ==
- Turba, Estonia, borough in Saue Parish, Harju County, Estonia
