= Anna Hollmann =

German comic book artist

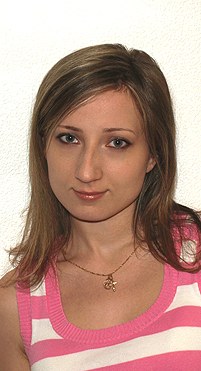
- Born: 1983 (age 42–43); Germany

Anna Hollmann (born 1983) is a German comic book artist.

She drew her first stories in 2003 and soon afterwards was published in Animexx's Manga Mix. Her series Stupid Story appeared in 2009; it is of the shonen-ai or "boy love" genre which is mainly targeted at young women. She has received several Sondermann Awards for her work. In 2011, she contributed an adaptation of the classic Rumpelstiltskin story to the German manga collection Grimms Manga Sonderband.

She also received an AnimaniA award in 2009.
