= Egmont Manga & Anime =

German publishing imprint

- Company type: GmbH
- Industry: Publishing
- Founded: 2000
- Headquarters: Gertrudenstraße 30–36, 50667 Köln, Germany
- Area served: Germany
- Key people: Klaus Thorsten Firnig
- Products: Comics
- Parent: Egmont Group
- Website: Egmont-Manga.de

Egmont Manga (EMA, formerly Egmont Manga & Anime) is one of the largest publishers of manga in Germany. It was founded in 2000 as a daughter company of Egmont Ehapa, after the manga boom in Germany became apparent around the turn of the millennium. Since 2003, EMA has been part of Egmont vgs in Cologne.

== History ==
In 1878, Egmont H. Petersen opened his own print shop in Copenhagen, which formed the foundation of the publishing firm. Its first big success was the family magazine, Hjemmet, in 1904, which still exists today in Scandinavia. For the opening of its large printery building, the Gutenberghus, Egmont received the title of royal court printery in 1914.

In 1948, the publishing company managed to secure the rights to Disney comics for several European countries. In 1951, a German subsidiary was founded, Ehapa. In the field of comics, it sold Disney works (translated by Dr. Erika Fuchs) and later also Asterix and Lucky Luke. In 1991, the Reiner Feest Verlag was bought out.

The first manga of the publishing house appeared in February 1994 under this label, with Appleseed. Further manga followed, but the great breakthrough did not occur until 1997/1998 with Sailor Moon.

In 2000, Ehapa published manga directed toward Japanese readers for the first time, with Wedding Peach. In October of the same year, the firm Egmont Manga & Anime (EMA) was founded. Since then, the head of the publisher has been Georg F.W. Tempel, who had already been responsible for the previous manga publications as the former chief editor for trend subjects at Ehapa. EMA is the first German manga publisher to have an advisor directly on location in Japan.

Weiß Kreuz, the first anime, followed in 2001. It was produced in cooperation with Anime-Virtual under the label of IKASU. In 2002, EMA was again integrated with Ehapa, but the label was kept. There was a merger of several companies from the Ehapa concern, as well as a fusion with Egmont vgs, in 2003. This resulted in EMA and the Ehapa Comic Collection (ECC) moving to Cologne. ECC became responsible for the comic publications of Ehapa in the book trade and it has also been led by Georg F.W. Tempel since the fusion with vgs. The Ehapa magazine department, which also publishes the Micky Maus magazine, is still located in Berlin.

From 2003 until 2005, EMA in cooperation with the organisation, Animexx e.V., organised the annual anime convention, Connichi, in Kassel.

The semi-annual program preview is the Shinkan.
