= Perscheid (surname) =

Perscheid' is a German language habitational surname. Notable people with the name include:

- Martin Perscheid (1966–2021), German cartoonist
- Nicola Perscheid (1864–1930), German photographer
