= Aisha Franz =

German illustrator and comic book artist

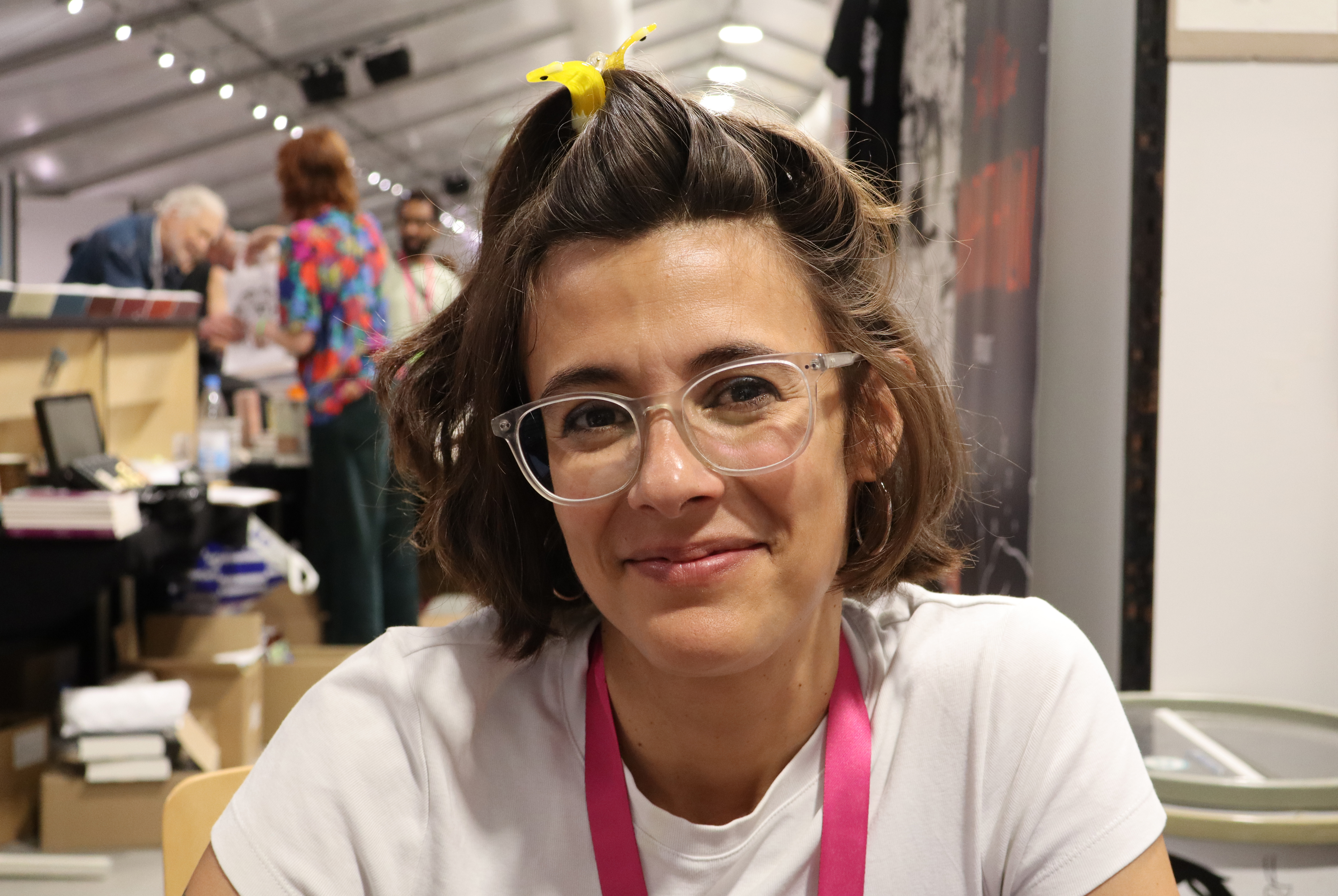
- Born: 1984 (age 41–42); Fürth, Germany
- Known for: comic books

Aisha Franz (born 1984) is a German illustrator and comic book artist based in Berlin. She is known for her internationally published graphic novels and zines.

== Life and career ==
The daughter of Colombian-Chilean immigrants, she was born in Fürth, Germany. Franz originally wanted to be a figure skater and create animated drawings for Walt Disney. She went on to study illustration at the School of Art and Design in Kassel. She lives and works in Berlin. Franz is part of the German comic publishing collective The Treasure Fleet.

Her first graphic novel Alien appeared in 2011; it was also published in France under the title Petite Terrienne by Éditions çà et là and in English as Earthling by Drawn & Quarterly. Her work has been published in Germany by Rotopolpress and Reprodukt and has also been included in various anthologies.

Her graphic novel Alien received an award for best foreign work at the 2013 Treviso Comic Book Festival.

Her work lays in the convergence of daily life routine and the existential inquiries around them, highlighting the absurdity of human reality. She also taught at the Kunsthochschule Kassel in the class for illustration and comic together with Hendrik Dorgathen.

== Selected works ==
- Alien (2011)
- Brigitte und der Perlenhort (2013), published in French as Brigitte et la perle cachée
- Shit is Real (2016)
- Work-Life-Balance. Reprodukt, Berlin 2022, ISBN 978-3-95640-308-8.
