= Thomas von Steinaecker =

German writer and filmmaker (born 1977)

- Steinaecker in 2026
- Born: 6 February 1977 (age 49); Traunstein, West Germany
- Occupation: novelist; journalist; filmmaker; comics writer

Thomas von Steinaecker (born 6 February 1977) is a German novelist, journalist, documentary filmmaker and comics writer.

== Life and work ==
Thomas von Steinaecker was born in Traunstein in Bavaria on 6 February 1977. He studied German, English and American literature and obtained a doctorate in 2006.

His debut novel, the family saga Wallner beginnt zu fliegen, was published in 2007. His other novels include Die Verteidigung des Paradieses (2016), set in a post-apocalyptic future, and Die Privilegierten (2023), focused on contemporary issues of media, technology and disasters.

Steinaecker's documentary films include Werner Herzog: Radical Dreamer (2022), about the filmmaker Werner Herzog, and Rilke: Du musst Dein Leben ändern (2025), about the poet Rainer Maria Rilke. Steinaecker wrote the comic book The Summer of Her Life (2017) which was illustrated by Barbara Yelin. It was published in English translation in 2020.

He lives in Augsburg.
