= Connichi =

Annual anime convention in Germany

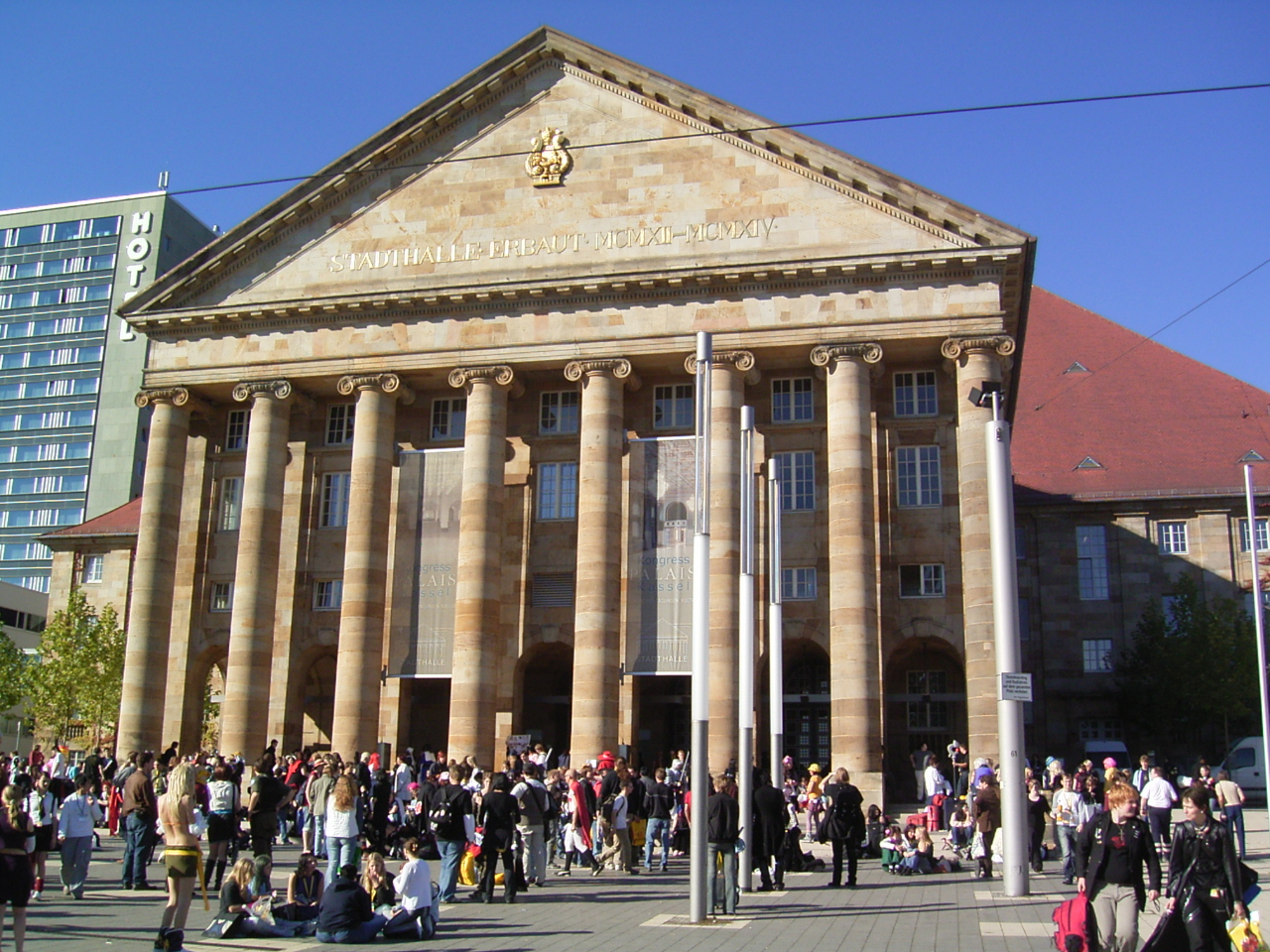
Front of the 'Kongress Palais Kassel' during Connichi 2005

Connichi is an annual, 3-day anime convention in Germany and one of the largest of its kind in the German-speaking world with over 24,000 visitors in 2013. It is held by the German anime association Animexx e.V.

== History ==
Connichi was first held in 2002 in Ludwigshafen, counting 1,500 visitors. Ever since, Connichi has been held every September in Kassel with visitor numbers having grown quickly beyond 12,000 in 2006.

== Location ==
The Kongress Palais Kassel and parts of the adjacent Hotel Ramada host the majority of events. The concert hall, "Festsaal", offers seating for about 1,500 people. Additional events such as Japanese rock concerts and visual kei cosplay events are held at the nearby venue Nachthallen.

A park next to, and an area at the entrance of, the Kongress Palais, as well as the surrounding architecture offer cosplayers space and background for photo shooting. Food and drinks may be purchased at the Palais, as well as at shops and supermarkets in the vicinity a number of which have in recent years begun to open for extended hours even on Sunday during the Connichi weekend.

During the event, the Connichi ticket allows to use public transport within a certain tariff zone for free.

== Agenda ==
Connichi offers a variety of attractions typical to anime conventions, such as shows and concerts, contests, video rooms, console games rooms, karaoke, vendors and exhibitors, and Bring'n'Buy flea markets; as well as workshops in Japanese language and culture such as how to wear a Kimono or how to draw manga-style. The latter are regularly held by Guests of Honour working in that area (see below for a list of guests).

=== Contests ===
Participation in any contest is free for every visitor but may be subject to prior registration or even submission of artistic material. While the actual range of contests may vary from Connichi to Connichi, the following contests are staple.

- Cosplay

Cosplayers can participate in separate contests which allow either one or two persons at a time, or up to five persons at a time. Since 2004 Connichi also holds the preliminary contest for the World Cosplay Summit to determine the German finalists. Besides the chance to participate in the WCS, the winner receives a flight ticket for the trip to Nagoya, Japan.

- Ramen Eating Contest

A cup of instant ramen noodles, usually sponsored by Nissin Foods, is freshly prepared, quickly cooled to prevent scalding, and to be eaten in the shortest time possible. Current record (2010) is 8.7 s.

- AMV Contest

In several categories, winners are determined whose videos will be shown.

Further staple contests include a console games competition, tournaments in Go, TCG and CMG, a hard Anime quiz, as well as Karaoke and Dōjinshi contests. Usually, the winners are announced and rewarded at the closing ceremony.

=== Guests of Honour ===
Connichi Guests of Honour come from a wide range of characters notable for their contributions to Japanese pop culture both in Germany and internationally, such as manga and anime artists, voice actors, as well as singers, idols and bands. Notably, Hiroyuki Yamaga has been enjoying attending every Connichi since 2003.

Connichi 2002 (May 3–5, 2002)
Anime: Kazuya Tsurumaki (Gainax)
Connichi 2003 (September 5–7, 2003)
Anime: Yasuhiro Takeda (Gainax), Hiroyuki Yamaga (Gainax)
Music: Toru Tanabe (Japanese Baritone singer)
Connichi 2004 (September 10–12, 2004)
Anime: Yasuhiro Takeda (Gainax), Hiroyuki Yamaga (Gainax), Takami Akai (Gainax)
Music: Blood, Toru Tanabe (Baritone)
Voice Actors: Rubina Kuraoka, Tobias Müller, Daniel Schlauch, Sebastian Schulz
Connichi 2005 (September 16–18, 2005)
Anime: Kazuhiro Takamura (Gainax), Hiroyuki Yamaga (Gainax)
Manga and Manhwa: Lee So-young, Sanami Matoh
Music: dream, Toru Tanabe (Baritone)
Voice actors: Sabine Bohlmann
Connichi 2006 (September 15–17, 2006)
Anime: Takami Akai (Gainax), Yoshiyuki Sadamoto (Gainax), Shoji Saeki (Gainax), Hiroyuki Yamaga (Gainax)
Manga: Makoto Tateno
Music: Toru Tanabe (Baritone)
Voice actors: Yukari Fukui, David Turba
Connichi 2007 (September 7–9, 2007)
Anime: Yuji Nunokawa (Studio Pierrot), Hiroyuki Yamaga (Gainax), Savin Yeatman-Eiffel (Director Ōban Star-Racers)
Manga: Ayano Yamane
Music: Haruko Momoi, M.o.v.e., Rentrer en Soi
Voice actors: Nobuyuki Hiyama, Tetsuya Kakihara
Connichi 2008 (September 12–14, 2008)
Anime: Takami Akai (Gainax), Hiroyuki Yamaga (Gainax), Yasuhiro Takeda (Gainax), Hiroyuki Imaishi (Director Gurren Lagann), Atsushi Nishigori (Charakter Design Gurren Lagann), Masahiko Ōtsuka (Storyboard Gurren Lagann), Yō Yoshinari (Mecha Design Gurren Lagann), Ryōji Masuyama (Artist Gurren Lagann)
Manga: Kazusa Takashima
Music: Haruko Momoi, Pornophonique
Connichi 2009 (September 18–20, 2009)
Anime: Hidenori Matsubara (Gainax), Takami Akai (Gainax), Hiroyuki Yamaga (Gainax), Haruko Momoi
Manga: Robert Labs
Music: Back-On
Connichi 2010 (September 10–12, 2010)
Anime: Hiroyuki Yamaga (Gainax), Yutaka Uemura (Gainax, Director Dantalian no Shoka), Gakuto Mikumo (Gainax, Writer Dantalian no Shoka)
Manga: You Higuri
Music: Olivia Lufkin, Haruko Momoi, Rumi Shishido
Misc: Kumiko Uehara (Lead Design for fashion label Baby, The Stars Shine Bright), Noir (Gainax, Director Market Research)
Connichi 2011 (September 16–18, 2011)
Anime: Hiroyuki Yamaga (Gainax), Osamu Kobayashi (Director), Michihiko Suwa (Yomiuri TV)
Music: Kouhei Tanaka, Cécile Corbel, May'n, Novala Takemoto (Dantalian no Shoka ending song writer)
Misc: Kumiko Uehara, Hideki Kenmochi (Vocaloid chief developer for Yamaha)
Voice Actor: Kaya Matsutani

=== Show acts ===
Apart from Japanese artists that go on stage, Connichi hosts a variety of amateur performers showing plays and musicals, singing and/or doing standup comedy with anime-related themes.

=== Workshops ===
The workshops vary from event to event. The following workshops are staple to Connichi.

- Fandub Workshop

Various scenes from anime are dubbed by visitors. The result is presented at the closing ceremony.

- Go Workshop

Visitors can get familiar with the game of Go or improve their skills.
