= Berliner Mythen =

2016 comic book by Reinhard Kleist

- Date: 26 April 2016
- Page count: 96 pages
- Publisher: Carlsen Verlag

Creative team
- Writer: Reinhard Kleist
- Artist: Reinhard Kleist

Original publication
- Published in: Zitty
- Date of publication: 2013–?
- Language: German
- ISBN: 978-3-551-72815-9

Berliner Mythen (lit. 'Berlin Myths') is a German comic by Reinhard Kleist. It consists of anecdotes and legends from Berlin, told by the Turkish taxi driver Ozan in a frame story. It is based on stories Kleist heard from many different sources while living in Berlin, including from taxi drivers.

The comic was published in the Berlin city magazine Zitty, beginning in 2013. Carlsen Verlag published the 96 pages long book version in 2016.
