= Chris Scheuer =

Austrian comic book author and illustrator (1952–2026)

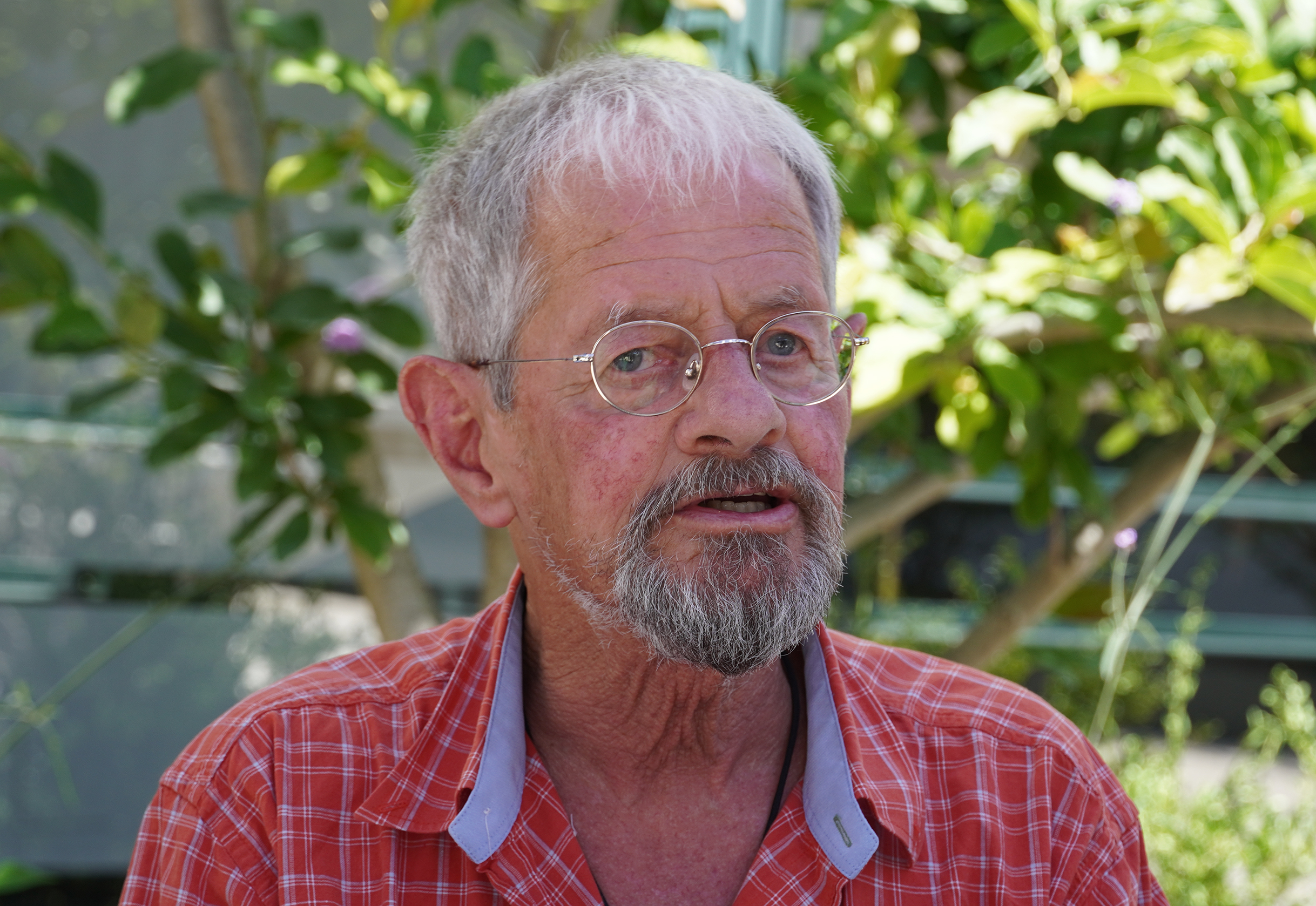
- Scheuer in 2025
- Born: 19 September 1952; Graz, Styria, Allied-occupied Austria
- Died: 12 July 2026 (aged 73)
- Occupations: Comic book author Illustrator

Chris Scheuer (19 September 1952 – 12 July 2026) was an Austrian comic book author and illustrator.

Scheuer notably received the Max und Moritz Award in 1984 for Best German-language Comic Artist.

Scheuer died on 12 July 2026, at the age of 73.

== Publications ==
- Comic-Lexikon (1988)
- Meister des Pinselstrichs. "Reiche Ernte“ – Das überraschende Comeback des Chris Scheuer (2021)
