= Animexx =

German association for the promotion of Japanese pop culture

- Animexx e. V
- Formation: January 30, 2000; 26 years ago
- Type: Nonprofit organization
- Legal status: Eingetragener Verein (e. V.)
- Purpose: Promotion of Japanese popular culture, especially anime and manga
- Location: Munich, Bavaria, Germany
- Region served: Germany
- Members: 646 (22 May 2024)
- Official language: German
- Website: https://verein.animexx.de

Animexx is a German voluntary association (Eingetragener Verein) for promotion of Japanese popular culture, in particular anime and manga. It was founded on 30 January 2000 in Munich when two other groups, 1. Sailor-Moon-Online-Fanclub and Animangai, merged. On 5 May 2008 Animexx became a member of Verband Deutsch-Japanischer Gesellschaften, a group of organizations and people interested in the relations between Japan and Germany.

As of May 2024, Animexx claims to currently have around 600 club members worldwide and approximately 28,000 online club members. Its site includes discussion forums, fanart galleries, and areas for publishing fanfiction and doujinshi. In association with Egmont Manga & Anime, and online magazine AnimePro, they republish some doujinshi in anthologies. According to German magazine Spiegel Online, it is "the largest web portal for Manga Artists in Germany".

There are over 10,000 doujinshi available on the site, which are quality controlled and checked for "legal acceptability". Real-person slash is not permitted, and there is a "complete ban" on shotacon and lolicon. Schwarzer Turm, a small publisher that specialises in publishing German work, uses Animexx to find new artists to publish, and they publish manga anthologies together.

In May 2002, the group also began organizing the Connichi fan convention, as well as four other smaller conventions: Hanami in Ludwigshafen, YukiCon in Zuffenhausen, J-Con in Merzig and Animuc in Fürstenfeldbruck.
