= Barbara Yelin =

German cartoonist (born 1977)

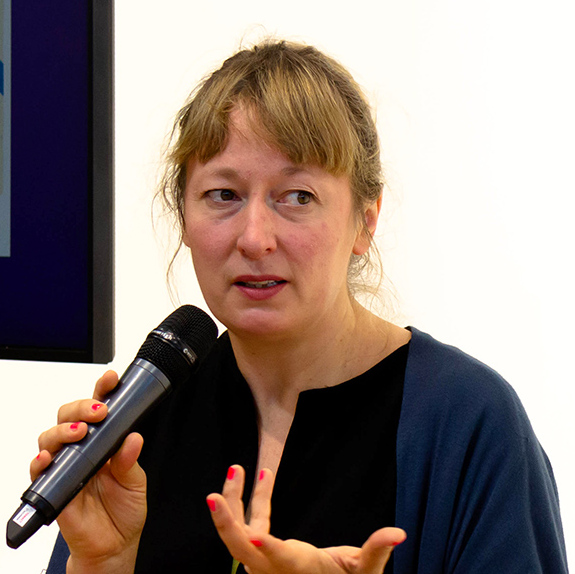
- At the Frankfurt Book Fair 2022
- Born: 26 July 1977 (age 49) Munich, Germany
- Area: cartoonist
- Awards: Bayerischer Kunstförderpreis; Max & Moritz Prize; Ernst-Hoferichter-Preis

Barbara Yelin (born 26 July 1977 in Munich) is a German cartoonist who has won several awards in Germany including the Bayerischer Kunstförderpreis, Max & Moritz Prize, and the Ernst-Hoferichter-Preis. As an educator, she has been affiliated with Hochschule der Bildenden Künste Saar and University of Applied Arts Vienna.

== Education ==
Barbara Yelin studied illustration at the Hamburg University of Applied Sciences and graduated in 2004.

== Career ==
She first published the comic stories Le visiteur (2004) and Le retard (2006) in France. In Germany, she drew contributions for the anthologies Spring. and Pomme d'amour. In 2010, she produced her comic Gift about the story of Gesche Gottfried based on a scenario by Peer Meter.

Between 2011 and 2012, the Frankfurter Rundschau regularly published her comic strip Riekes Notizen, and Reprodukt published a selection of the strips in 2013.

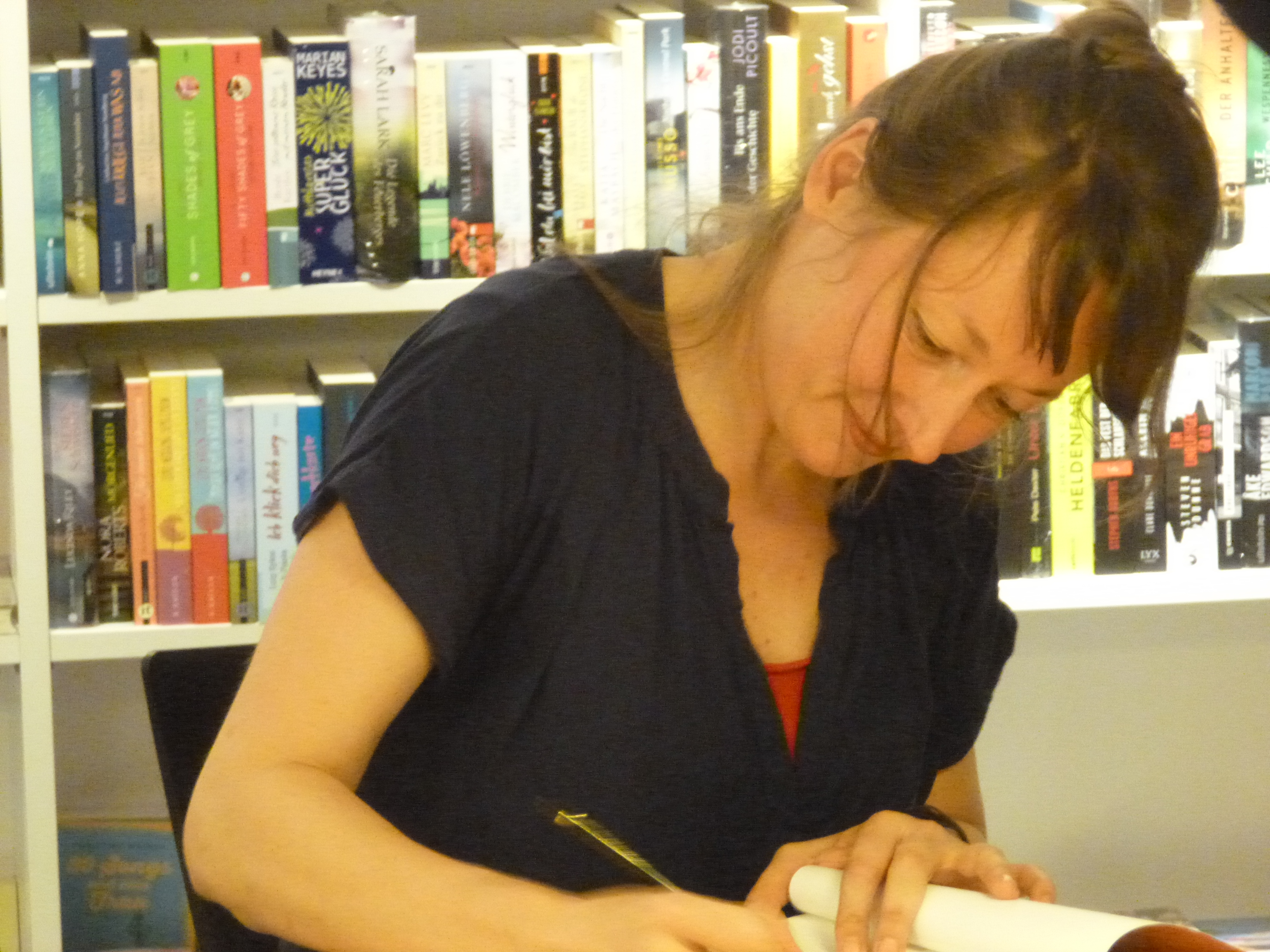
In Dortmund (2015)

In 2014, her story Irmina about a collaborator during the Nazi Germany period, was also published by Reprodukt, with which she also covered some of her own family history. As of March 2022, Yelin's work has been translated into 10 languages, including English, French, Italian, Dutch, and Turkish.

From autumn 2015, together with the author Thomas von Steinaecker, she published the web sequel comic Der Sommer ihres Lebens, which was also published as a book by Reprodukt in 2016.

In 2018, Carlsen Verlag published Die Unheimlichen, Yelin's adaptation of Das Wassergespenst von Harrowby Hall in the series edited by Isabel Kreitz. In 2019, Yelin self-published Unsichtbar, in which she tells the story of an Eritrean refugee in collaboration with Ursula Yelin.

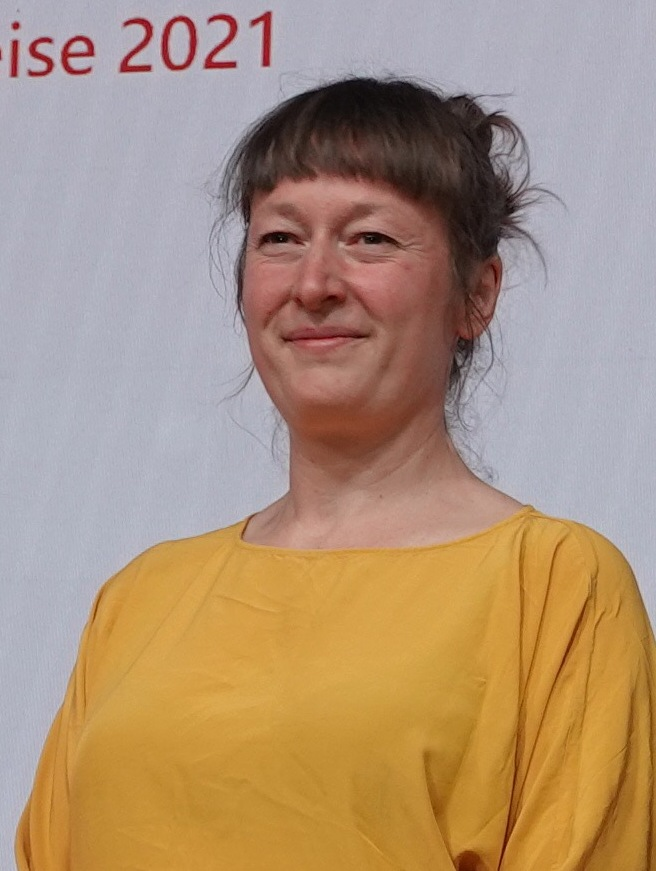
Winner, Ernst Hoferichter Prize 2022

In cooperation with Alex Rühle, the children's book Gigaguhl und das Riesen-Glück was published by dtv Junior in 2020. In May 2022, But I live was published by the University of Toronto Press, in which Yelin talks about remembrance, based on the life of Holocaust survivor Emmie Arbel. The book portrays three Holocaust survivors in the format of graphic novels.

In 2012, Yelin was appointed visiting professor for comics and graphic novels at the Hochschule der Bildenden Künste Saar. During the period of 2013 to 2015, she was a lecturer at the "Comic-Seminar" in Erlangen. In 2018, she was a writer-in-residence at Grinnell College in Iowa. Also since 2018, she has been teaching at the University of Applied Arts Vienna. Since 2018, she has directed and moderated the Comic Bar, a series of lectures by the Munich City Library with international guests.

== Personal life ==
Yelin was a member of the Berlin Atelier Bilderbureau. She works and lives with her partner and their son in Munich.

== Awards (selection) ==
- 2015, Prix Artémisia
- 2015, Bayerischer Kunstförderpreis
- 2016, Max & Moritz Prize, category, "Best German-language Comic Artist"
- 2016, Residency grant from the Künstlerresidenz Chretzeturm, Stein am Rhein
- 2017 Nomination for an Eisner Award
- 2018, Calendar Prize of the Frankfurt Book Fair
- 2018, Rudolph-Dirks-Award for "Der Sommer ihres Lebens" with Thomas von Steinaecker
- 2019, Rudolph-Dirks-Award for "Das Wassergespenst von Harrowby Hall"
- 2021, Ernst-Hoferichter-Preis
- 2021, Working grant for Munich authors
- 2025, Großer Preis der Deutschen Akademie für Kinder- und Jugendliteratur e.V. Volkach

== Selected works ==
- With Gilad Seliktar, Miriam Libicki: But I Live: Three Stories of Child Survivors of the Holocaust. University of Toronto Press, Toronto 2022, ISBN 978-1-48752684-9
- With Paul-Moritz Rabe (Herausgeber): Tagebuch eines Zwangsarbeiters. Verlag C. H. Beck, Munich 2022, ISBN 978-3-406-78165-0
- With Alex Rühle: Gigaguhl und das Riesen-Glück. dtv Junior, Munich 2020, ISBN 978-3-423-76286-1
- Die Unheimlichen: Das Wassergespenst von Harrowby Hall. Carlsen Verlag, Hamburg 2018, ISBN 978-3-551-71350-6
- With Thomas von Steinaecker: Der Sommer ihres Lebens. Reprodukt, Berlin 2017, ISBN 978-3-95640-135-0
- With David Polonsky: Vor allem eins: Dir selbst sei treu. Die Schauspielerin Channa Maron. Reprodukt, Berlin 2016, ISBN 978-3-95640-102-2
- Irmina. Reprodukt, Berlin 2014, ISBN 978-3-95640-006-3
- Riekes Notizen. Vorwort Hella von Sinnen. Reprodukt, Berlin 2013, ISBN 978-3-943143-51-5
- Vincent van Gogh. Kunst-Comic, with Mona Horncastle, Prestel, Munich 2011, ISBN 978-3-7913-7071-2
- Albrecht Dürer. Kunst-Comic, with Mona Horncastle, Prestel, Munich 2011, ISBN 978-3-7913-7070-5
- Gift. with Peer Meter, Reprodukt, Berlin 2010, ISBN 978-3-941099-41-8
- Le retard. Translated from the German by Thierry Groensteen. Edition de l’An 2, Angoulême DL 2006, ISBN 978-2-84856-068-7
- Le visiteur. Edition de l’An 2, Angoulême DL 2004, ISBN 978-2-84856-029-8
