= Ulli Lust =

Austrian cartoonist (born 1967)

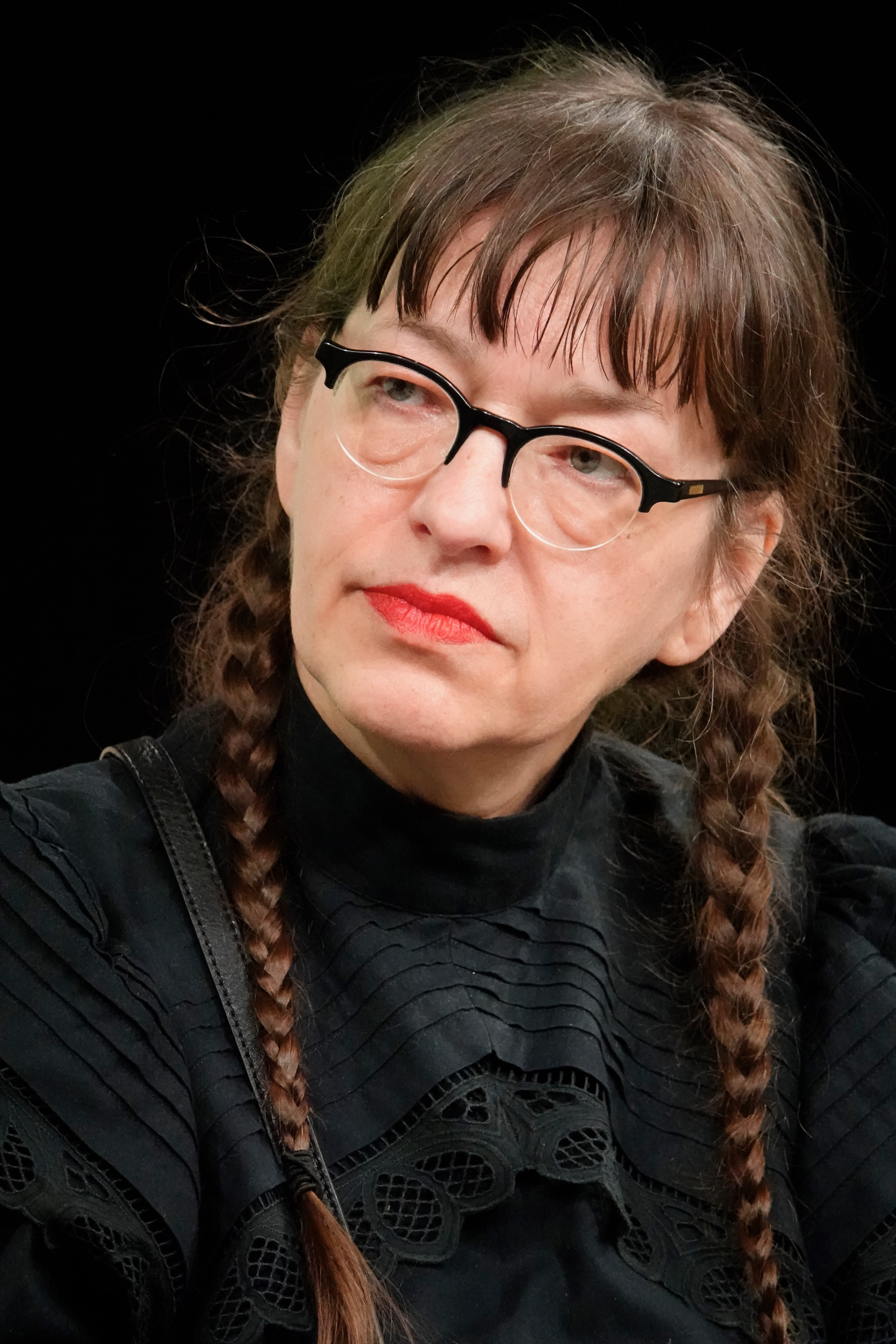
- Ulli Lust in 2026
- Born: 1967 (age 58–59) Vienna, Austria
- Area: Cartoonist
- Notable works: Today is the Last Day of the Rest of Your Life

Ulli Lust (born 1967) is an Austrian cartoonist who lives and works in Berlin.

Her most recent graphic novel Am Anfang der Geschichte, 2025 (English translation, Early Man Was a Woman: Reclaiming Prehistory) won the 2026 Max Und Moritz Award for Best Non-fiction Comic, considered the most important and prestigious graphic literature award in German-speaking countries. Her graphic novel Today is the Last Day of the Rest of Your Life was translated into English and published by Fantagraphics Books in 2013. In 2013, Today is the Last Day of the Rest of Your Life won an Ignatz Award for best graphic novel, the LA Times Book Award for Graphic Novels and then in 2014 was nominated for an Eisner Award for Best Reality-Based Work. In 2013, Lust also published an adaptation of Marcel Beyer's 1995 novel, Flughunde, which presents a fictional account of Helga Goebbels, the daughter of German World War II minister of propaganda Joseph Goebbels. This was published in English as Voices in the Dark.

Many of the books of Lust are published in German, Dutch, French, Swedish, Italian, Spanish and English. She holds a professorship at the University of Applied Sciences and Arts in Hannover, Germany, and holds lectures and workshops internationally and on digital channels.

== Works ==
- Fashionvictims, Trendverächter: Bildkolumnen und Minireportagen aus Berlin, Suhrkamp Verlag, 2008.
- Heute ist der letzte Tag vom Rest deines Lebens, avant-verlag, 2009. (English translation, Today is the Last Day of the Rest of Your Life, Fantagraphics Books, 2013)
- Voices in the Dark, New York Review Comics, 2017
- How I Tried to Be a Good Person, Fantagraphics Books, 2019
- Die Frau als Mensch: Am Anfang der Geschichte, Reprodukt 2025. (English translation, Early Man Was a Woman: Reclaiming Prehistory, The Experiment, 2026)
- Die Frau als Mensch: Schamaninnen, 2026
