= Martin Perscheid =

German cartoonist (1966–2021)

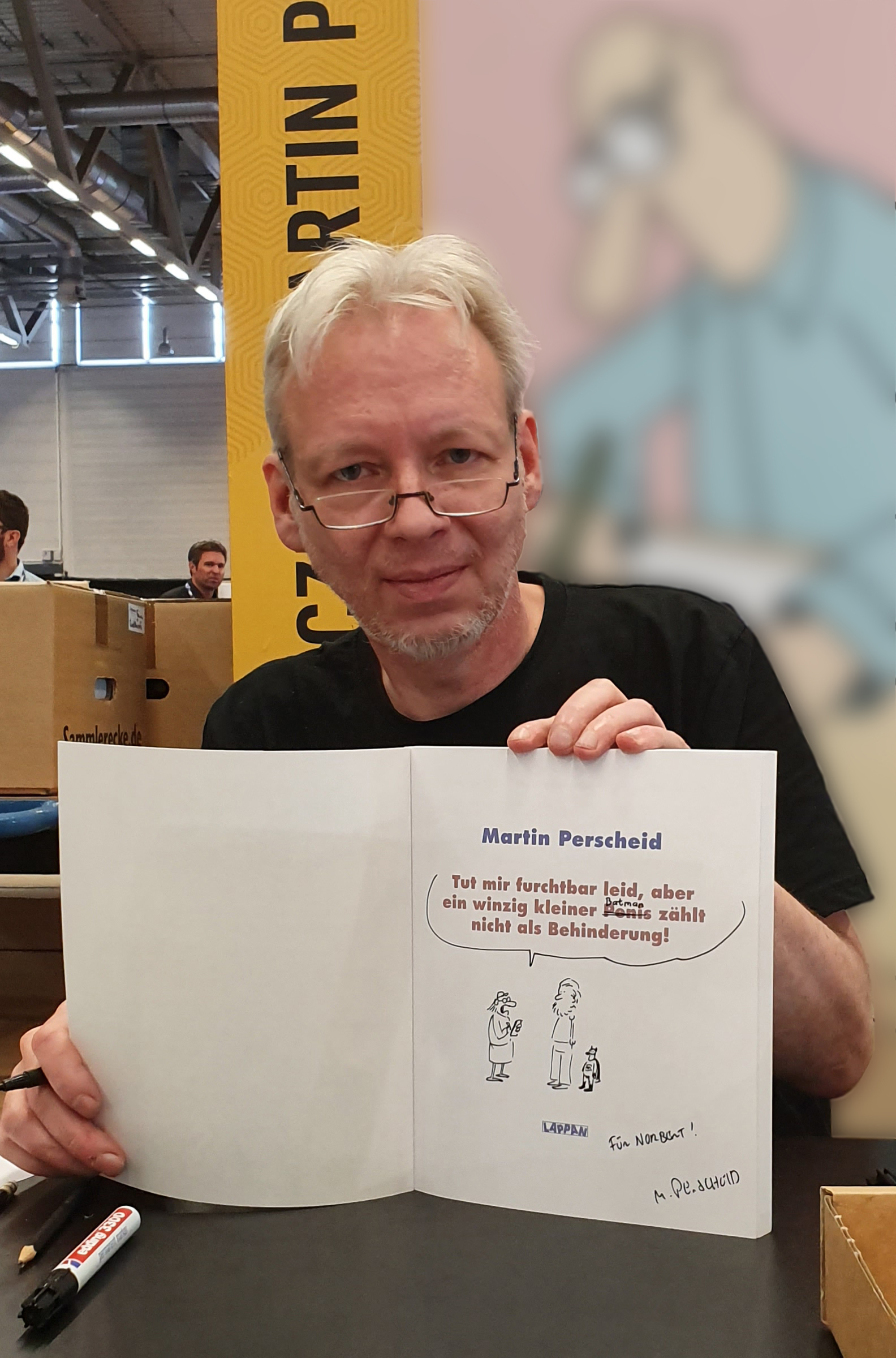
- Perscheid at 2019 CCXP in Cologne
- Born: 16 February 1966; Wesseling, Germany
- Died: 31 July 2021 (aged 55); Wesseling, Germany
- Occupation: Cartoonist
- Known for: Perscheids Abgründe
- Awards: Max & Moritz Prize
- Website: www.martin-perscheid.de

Martin Perscheid (16 February 1966 – 31 July 2021) was a German cartoonist. He created a main character in 1994, who appeared from 1998 under the title Perscheids Abgründe (Perscheid's abysses). More than 4,300 strips appeared in several German newspapers and magazines. He is known for his "fearless glimpses into human abysses of sexism, racism, ignorance, corruption and stupidity, captured with black humour."

== Life ==
Perscheid was born in Wesseling on 16 February 1966, where he lived and worked until his death. He was trained as a lithograph designer. Perscheid was married and had two children but at the time of his death he was in a relationship with fellow cartoonist Nadia Menze. Perscheid died on 31 July 2021 after a long battle with cancer.

Born to a Catholic family, Perscheid soon became an atheist and humanist which influenced his work significantly. From 2020 to his death, he was a member of the board of advisers of the Giordano Bruno Foundation, a German non-profit organization that promotes evolutionary humanism and enlightenment.

== Cartoons ==
Perscheid's drawing style has been compared to that of Gary Larson. His themes are usually satirical, not avoiding taboo subjects, and often including black comedy. His series were in an unchanged upright format framed black, drawn with sparse lines and unerring punch line delivery ("mit zielsicherer Pointenführung").

His works have been published in various German newspapers and magazines. In 1994, he joined the Lappan Verlag, and remained with the house until his death. He then created his main character, a bald, bespectacled man, and a stand-in for Perscheid himself. His series around the character was named Perscheids Abgründe (Perscheid's Abysses) in 1996. He created over 4,300 strips. He published his first book in 1995. In his career, he published over 25 books with cartoons.

== Awards and legacy ==
Perscheid's cartoons have been presented in museums, including a show of the Caricatura museum in Kassel and the Museum der niederrheinischen Seele in 2017.

He received many awards for his work, including the Max & Moritz Prize 2002 for the best Cartoon Series in German, as well as the "Kulturplakette" (Culture Award) from his hometown of Wesseling. The Caricatura museum honoured him by a sculpture of his cartoon character, named Der unbekannte Idiot (The unknown idiot).

His publisher, Carlsen Verlag, wrote in an obituary: "His fearlessness of glimpses into human abysses of sexism, racism, ignorance, corruption and stupidity, and how he captured all this in cartoons with biting derision and black humour, was unique."
