= Nicolas Mahler =

Austrian cartoonist

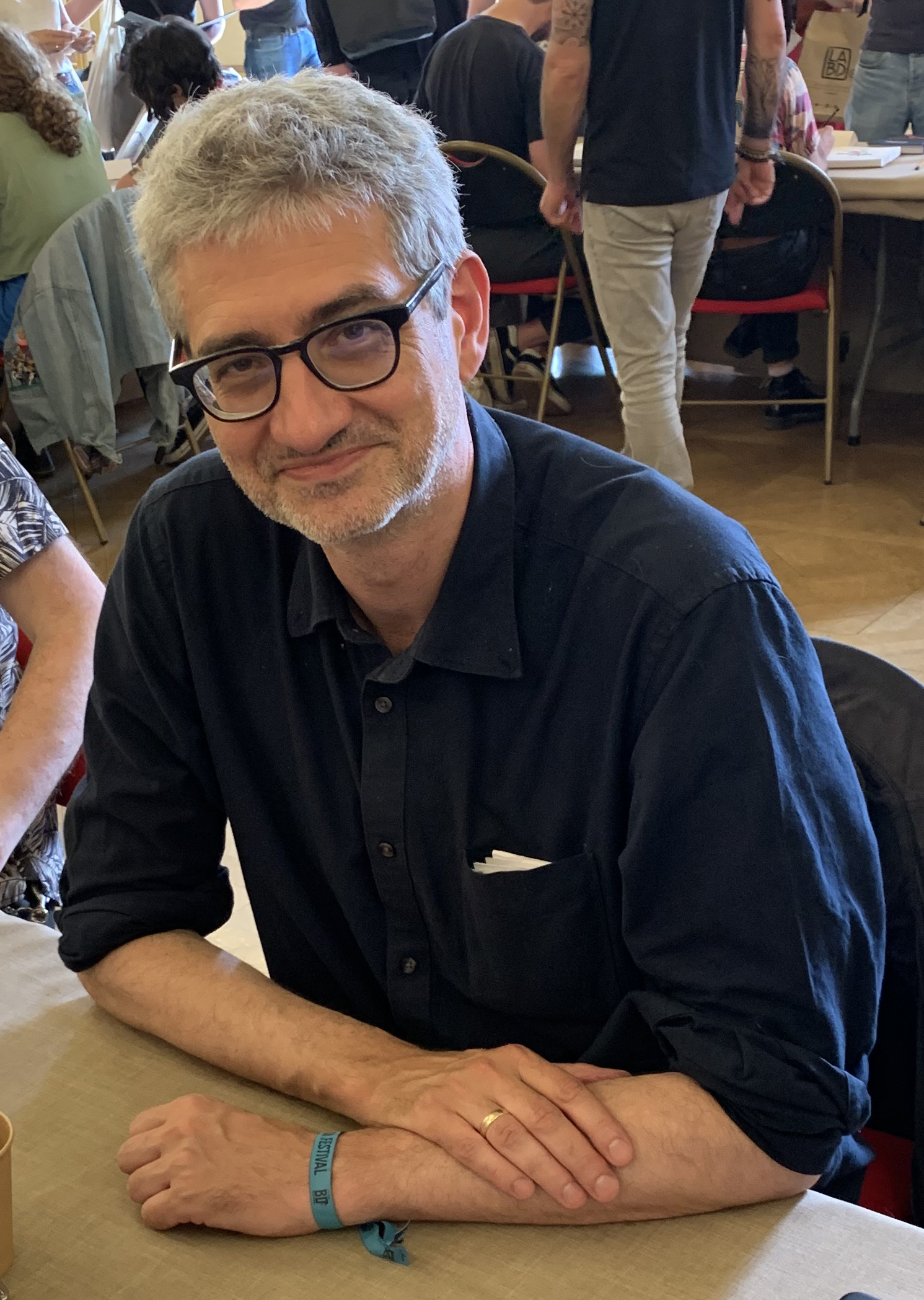
- Mahler in 2024
- Born: 1969 (age 56–57); Vienna, Austria
- Occupation: Cartoonist
- Notable work: Flaschko, Kratochvil
- Awards: Max & Moritz Prize; Preis der Literaturhäuser

Nicolas Mahler (born 1969) is an Austrian cartoonist and illustrator. Die Zeit, NZZ am Sonntag, Frankfurter Allgemeine Sonntagszeitung and Titanic print his comics. He is known for his comics Flaschko and Kratochvil and for his literary adaptations in comic form. His comics have been adapted into films and theatre plays. He was awarded the Max & Moritz Prize and the Preis der Literaturhäuser.

== Life and career ==
Mahler was born in Vienna. He is an autodidact, and started working as an illustrator soon after leaving school. Mahler draws for Austrian, German and Swiss newspapers, magazines and anthologies. He has published over twenty books, including in France and Canada. His Flaschko-comics were adapted as animated films and screened at various short film festivals in Europe. His comic Kratochvil was performed as a puppet play in Switzerland, Austria and France. In 2003, together with Rudi Klein and Heinz Wolf, he founded the Kabinett für Wort und Bild in Vienna Museumsquartier.

Mahler produced several literary adaptations in comic form, including Alte Meister (after Thomas Bernhard's novel), Alice in Sussex (based on Alice's Adventures in Wonderland) and Der Mann ohne Eigenschaften (after Robert Musil's novel) as well as adaptations in 2020 of James Joyce's Ulysses and Finnegans Wake. In addition to his fictional stories, Mahler published Kunsttheorie versus Frau Goldgruber (Art Theory vs. Mrs. Goldgruber), Die Zumutungen der Moderne (The Impositions of Modernity), Pornographie und Selbstmord (Pornography and suicide), as well as Franz Kafkas Nonstop Lachmaschine (Franz Kafka's Nonstop Laughing Machine), as autobiographical comics in which he processes his sometimes absurd experiences in everyday life and in the comic scene.

Mahler has been known to German readers through his publications in the satirical magazine Titanic. From 2014 to 2016, he also published in the monthly magazine Chrismon.

Mahler lives in Vienna. He is married and has a son.

== Style ==
Mahler's style is characterised by an extremely reduced stroke with which he captures cranky characters. The award citation for the Max & Moritz Prize states:

Die Figuren von Nicolas Mahler haben keine Augen, keine Ohren, keine Münder – aber sie haben zweifellos Charakter. Stets gelingt es Mahler, mit minimalistischen Zeichnungen und maximalem Humor seine wenigen Striche auf den Punkt zu bringen. Dabei pendelt er virtuos zwischen banal, absurd und kafkaesk.

(Nicolas Mahler's figures have no eyes, no ears, no mouths – but they undoubtedly have character. Mahler always succeeds in getting to the heart of his few strokes with minimalist drawings and maximal humour. In doing so, he virtuously oscillates between banal, absurd and kafkaesque.)

== Awards ==
- 1999: ICOM Independent Comic Preis – Special prize (Flaschko – Der Mann in der Heizdecke and TNT: Eine Boxerstory)
- 2006: Max & Moritz Prize for the best comic in German (Das Unbehagen)
- 2007: Deutscher Karikaturenpreis, "Geflügelter Bleistift" in Silver
- 2008: Max & Moritz Prize for the best comic-strip (Flaschko – Der Mann in der Heizdecke)
- 2010: Max & Moritz Prize for the best comic-artist in German
- 2013: Sepp-Schellhorn-Stipendium (scholarship) in Goldegg
- 2015: Preis der Literaturhäuser
- 2019: Sondermann Award

== Publications ==
=== Cartoon collections ===
- Das Unbehagen. Humor-Zeichnungen. Edition Moderne, Zürich 2005, ISBN 3-907055-95-0.
- Die Herrenwitz-Variationen. Edition Moderne, Zürich 2008, ISBN 978-3-03731-036-6
- Was fehlt uns denn?. Edition Moderne, Zürich 2011, ISBN 978-3-03731-071-7.
- Mein Therapeut ist ein Psycho. Edition Moderne, Zürich 2013, ISBN 978-3-03731-116-5.
- Die Smalltalkhölle. Edition Moderne, Zürich 2014, ISBN 978-3-03731-127-1.
- Der Urknall. Edition Moderne, Zürich 2015, ISBN 978-3-03731-141-7.
- In Zukunft werden wir alle alt aussehen. Edition Moderne, Zürich 2017, ISBN 978-3-03731-159-2.
- Wir müssen reden. Edition Moderne, Zürich 2019, ISBN 978-3-03731-188-2.

=== Comics ===
- TNT: Eine Boxerstory. ISBN 978-3-9500656-4-0.
- Lone racer. 1999, ISBN 2-84414-029-7 (French first edition L'Association; In English at Top Shelf 2006; in German at Reprodukt 2012).
- Lame ryder. 2001, ISBN 3-931377-74-1.
- Das Raupenbuch. Edition 52, 2002, 20 pages, ISBN 978-3-935229-17-3.
- leicht beschädigte tiere. 2002, ISBN 3-9500656-5-2.
- Kunsttheorie versus Frau Goldgruber. 2003, ISBN 3-85266-221-4.
- Kratochvil. Edition Selene, Wien 2004, ISBN 3-907055-78-0.
- Die Zumutungen der Moderne. Reprodukt, Berlin 2007.
- Van Helsing macht blau. 2008, ISBN 978-3-938511-98-5 (German version of Van Helsing's Night Off. ISBN 1-891830-38-4).
- Längen und Kürzen. Luftschacht, Vienna 2009. ISBN 978-3-902373-47-2
- SPAM. Reprodukt, Berlin 2009. ISBN 978-3-941099-17-3
- Engelmann: Der gefallene Engel. Carlsen Verlag, Hamburg 2010. ISBN 978-3-551-78503-9
- Pornografie und Selbstmord. Reprodukt, Berlin 2010. ISBN 978-3-941099-33-3
- Franz Kafkas nonstop Lachmaschine. Reprodukt, Berlin 2014. ISBN 978-3-943143-93-5
- Partyspaß mit Kant. Suhrkamp, Berlin 2015. ISBN 978-3-518-46634-6.
- Das kleine Einschlafbuch für Große. Suhrkamp, Berlin 2016. ISBN 978-3-518-46723-7.
- Die Goldgruber-Chroniken. Reprodukt, Berlin 2017. ISBN 978-3-95640-121-3
- Das Ritual. Reprodukt, Berlin 2018, ISBN 978-3-95640-165-7.
- Der Fremde. Carlsen, Hamburg 2018. ISBN 978-3-551-71349-0
- Das kleine Überlebens-ABC. Suhrkamp, Berlin 2018. ISBN 978-3-518-46875-3.
- Thomas Bernhard. Die unkorrekte Biografie. Suhrkamp, Berlin 2021, ISBN 978-3-518-47125-8.
- Schwarze Spiegel. Suhrkamp, Berlin 2021, ISBN 978-3-518-22528-8.
- Nachtgestalten (with Jaroslav Rudiš) Luchterhand, Munich 2021, ISBN 978-3-630-87638-2.

==== Flaschko ====
- Flaschko, der Mann in der Heizdecke. Dämon Damenlikör. 2002, ISBN 3-907055-63-2.
- Flaschko, der Mann in der Heizdecke. Die Staublunge. 2007, ISBN 978-3-03731-021-2.
- Flaschko, der Mann in der Heizdecke. Die Müllsekte. 2009, ISBN 978-3-03731-047-2.

=== Illustrations ===
- Die kleine Unbildung. Liessmann für Analphabeten (with Konrad Paul Liessmann). Zsolnay, Vienna 2018, ISBN 978-3-552-05912-2.

=== Literary adaptations ===
- Alte Meister. Comedy by Thomas Bernhard, Andreas Platthaus (ed.): Suhrkamp, Berlin 2011, ISBN 978-3-518-46293-5.
- Der Mann ohne Eigenschaften. Graphic novel after Robert Musil. Suhrkamp, Berlin 2013, ISBN 978-3-518-46483-0.
- Alice in Sussex. Suhrkamp 2013, ISBN 978-3-518-46386-4.
  - Previously as: Alice in Sussex. in Frankfurter Allgemeine Zeitung, since 6 November 2012.
- Lulu und das schwarze Quadrat. Suhrkamp, Berlin 2014. ISBN 978-3-518-46575-2.
- Comic adaptation after Marcel Proust's In Search of Lost Time. Suhrkamp, Berlin 2017, ISBN 978-3-518-46808-1.
- Nicolas Mahler, James Joyce: Ulysses. Suhrkamp, Berlin 2020, ISBN 978-3-518-47006-0.
- Nicolas Mahler, James Joyce: Finnegans Wake (series mini kuš! Nr. 92). Grafiskie stāsti, Riga 2020, ISBN 978-9934-581-30-4

=== Poetry (with illustrations) ===
- Gedichte. With an afterword by Raimund Fellinger (Insel-Bücherei. 1385). Insel Verlag, Berlin 2013, ISBN 978-3-458-19385-2.
- Dachbodenfund. Gedichte. Luftschacht Verlag, Vienna 2015, ISBN 978-3-902844-54-5.
- In der Isolierzelle. Gedichte. Luftschacht Verlag, Vienna 2017, ISBN 978-3-903081-10-9.
- Solar Plexy. Gedichte. Luftschacht Verlag, Vienna 2018. ISBN 978-3-903081-29-1

=== Scenarios ===
- Molch. Luftschacht, Wien 2008 (Illustrator: Heinz Wolf). ISBN 978-3-902373-37-3
