= Ernst-Hoferichter-Preis =

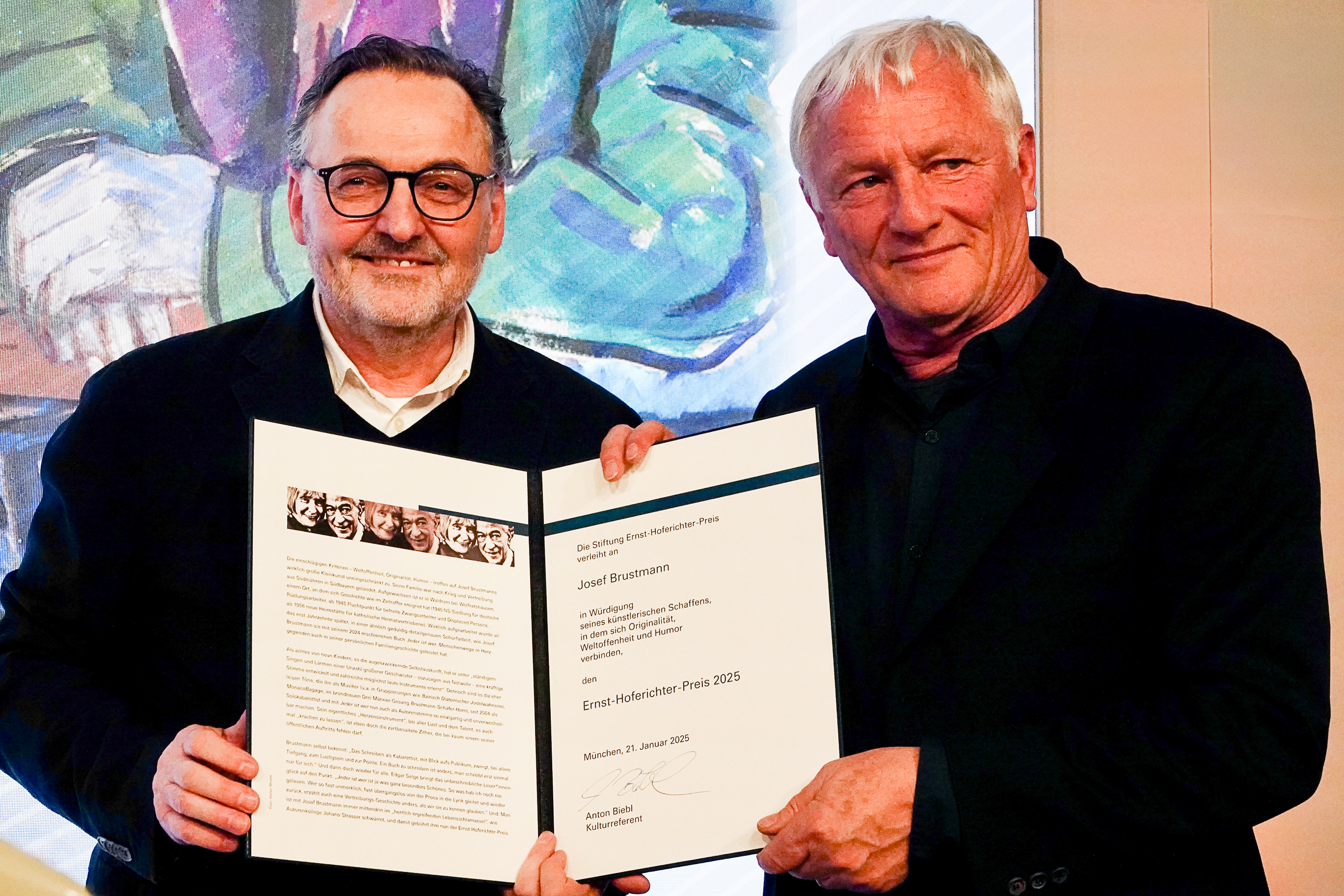
Josef Brustmann (right) receiving the Ernst Hoferichter Prize 2025, presented by Munich's cultural representative Anton Biebl.

Ernst-Hoferichter-Preis is a literary prize of Germany. It was established in 1975 and is awarded to writers and artists from Munich. Winners are awarded €5,000.
