= Simon Schwartz (artist) =

German illustrator

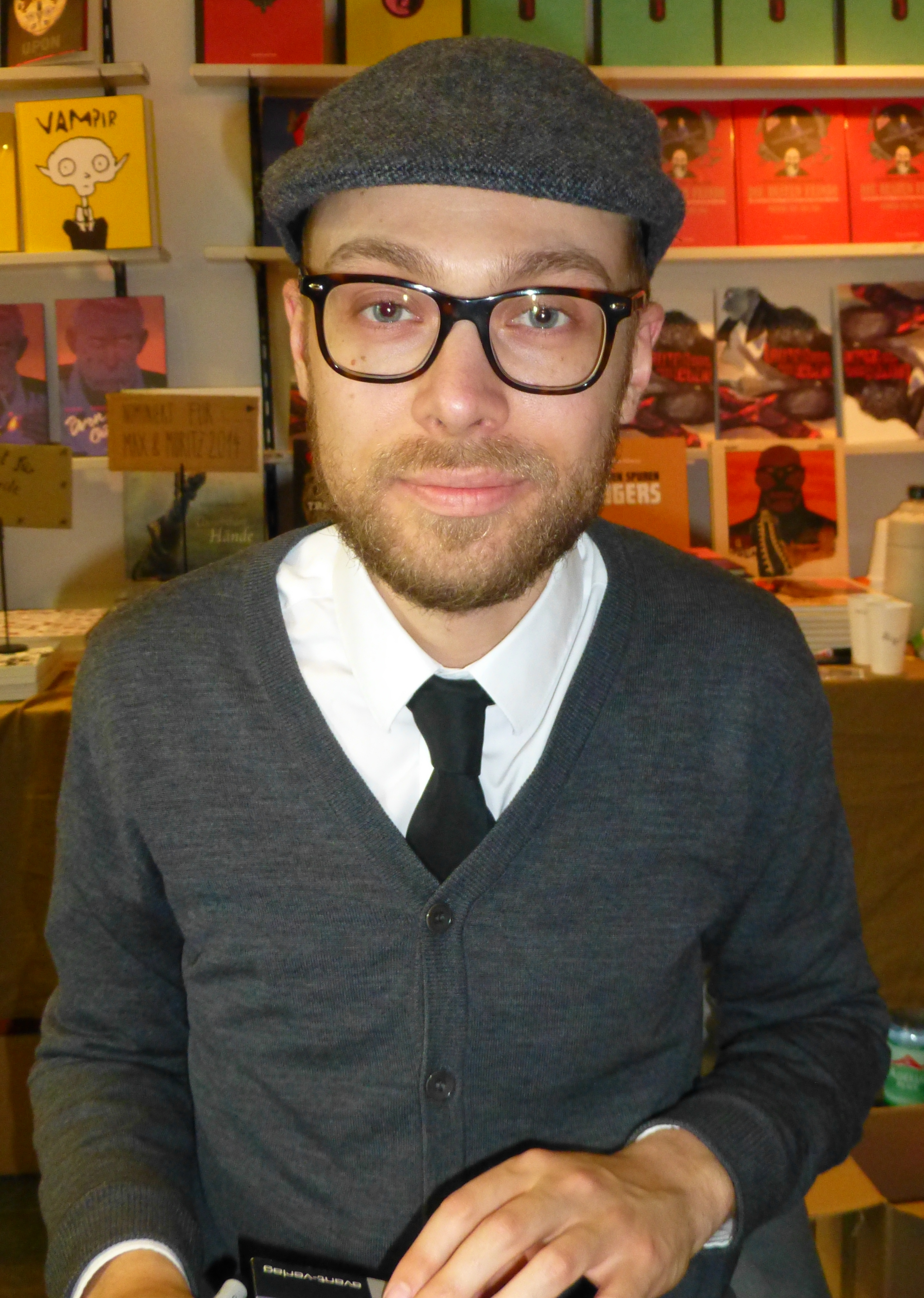
Simon Schwartz at the "Comic Salon", Erlangen in 2014

Simon Schwartz (born 5 October 1982) is a German illustrator, comic writer and cartoonist. His work is published in the Frankfurter Allgemeine Sonntagszeitung, Die Zeit and other newspapers and magazines. He has written graphic novels including "drüben!" and "Packeis" and his work has been translated into French and English.

== Life and work ==
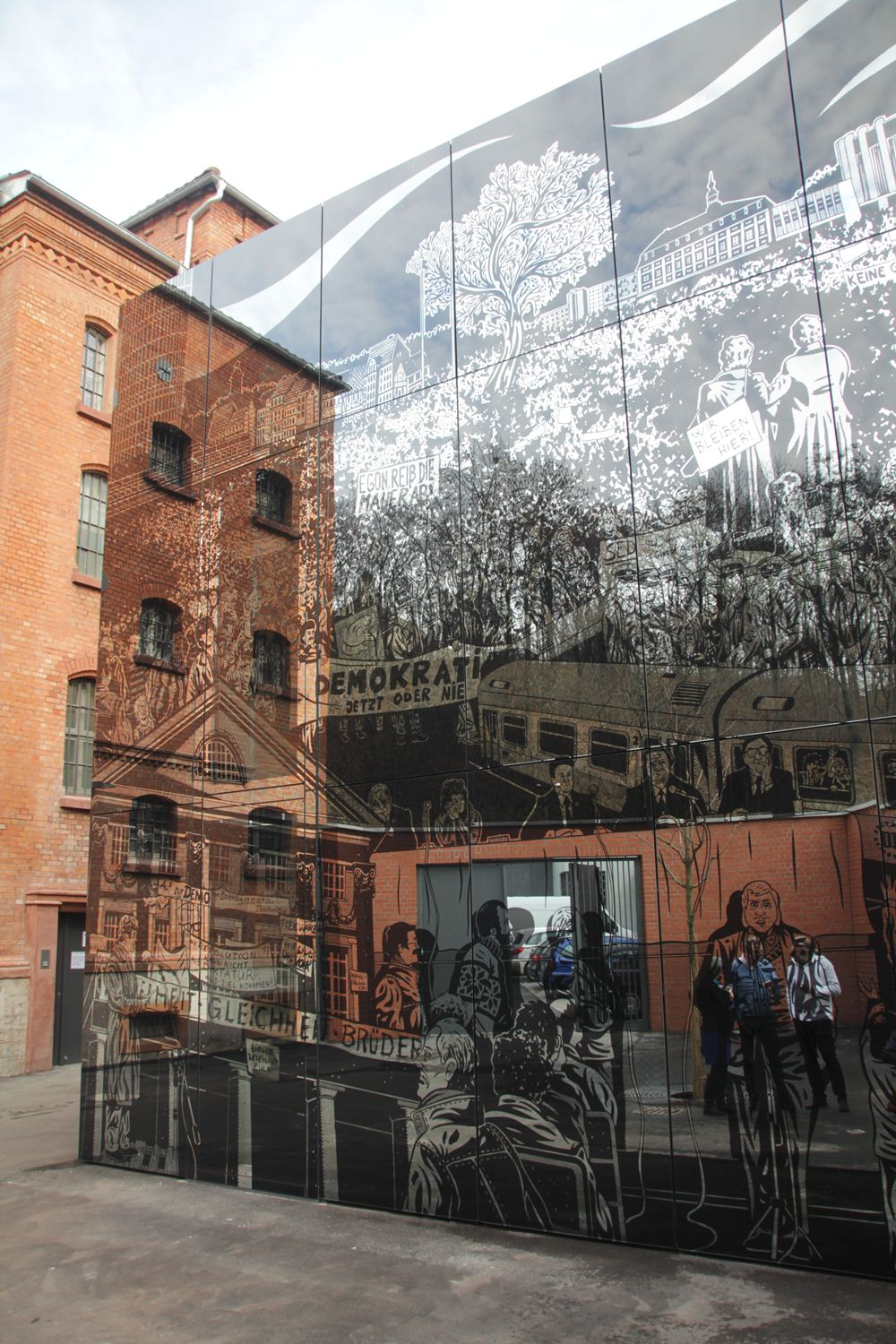
The "Kubus" at the Memorial and Education Centre Andreasstrasse, Erfurt, on which Schwartz's work "Thuringia in Autumn" is drawn.

Schwartz was born in 1982 in Erfurt, which was then in East Germany. When he was 18 months old he moved with his parents to West Germany, where the family lived in the Berlin district of Kreuzberg.

He studied illustration at the Hamburg University of Applied Sciences under the cartoonist Anke Feuchtenberger, undertaking a Diploma in Illustration, 2004-2009, and a Master of Arts, 2011-2014. He taught illustration at the University from 2011-2016.

Schwartz has worked as a freelance illustrator since 2006. From 2008 he has worked regularly for the Frankfurter Allgemeine Zeitung. He has regularly produced comics for the political section of the newspaper Die Zeit since 2010. His illustrations are published in the children's magazine GEOlino, and the newspaper Der Tagesspiegel.

=== Graphic novels ===
Schwartz's work is often based around historical and biographical events. His first graphic novel, "drüben!" ("Over there") was written as course work for his Diploma in Illustration and published in 2009. It tells the story of how his parents left the East Germany, with him as a small child, and the difficulties they encountered. They left legally, by applying for an "Ausreiseantrag" (permit to leave), but this was a risky course of action as many applications were turned down, and it brought applicants to the attention of the authorities as not being loyal to the state. The Schwartz's application took three years to process. The novel was published in French in 2011 and in English, as The Other Side of the Wall, in 2015.

His second graphic novel Packeis (Pack ice) was published in 2012, as a French translation in 2014 and in English in 2015, as First Man: Reimagining Matthew Henson. It is a fictional story based on the life of the African-American explorer Matthew Henson, who was part of the 1909 expedition that claimed to be the first to reach the North Pole.

=== Kubus der Friedlichen Revolution ===
In 2012 Schwartz created the 7.5 m high and 40 m long graphic work "Thüringen im Herbst" (Thuringia in Autumn) for the Memorial and Education Centre Andreasstrasse, a museum in Erfurt which is housed in a former Stasi remand prison for political prisoners. The work is drawn on an architectural glass box, the "Kubus der Friedlichen Revolution" ("The Cube of the Peaceful Revolution") in the museum courtyard. In the style of a graphic novel, it tells the story of the Peaceful Revolution of 1989, and of the occupation of the prison and the Erfurt Stasi district headquarters on 4 December 1989, which was the first time East German citizens had taken such action against the Stasi. It is based on over 100 contemporaneous photographs of the protests.

== Bibliography ==
- Schwartz, Simon (2019) Das Parlament 45 Leben für die Demokratie. Berlin: Avant-verlag ISBN 978-3-96445-006-7
- Schwartz, Simon (2018) Ikon. Berlin: Avant-verlag ISBN 978-394503-479-8
- Schwartz, Simon (2018) Geschichtsbilder - Comics & Graphic Novels: Katalog zur Ausstellung. Berlin: Avant-verlag ISBN 978-394503-491-0
- Schwartz, Simon (2015) The Other Side of the Wall (English translation of "drüben!", 2009). Minneapolis: Graphic Universe/Lerner Publishing Group ISBN 978-146776-028-7
- Schwartz, Simon (2015) First Man: Reimagining Matthew Henson (English translation of Packeis, 2012). Minneapolis: Graphic Universe/Lerner Publishing Group ISBN 978-146778-106-0
- Schwartz, Simon (2014) Vita Obscura. Berlin: Avant-verlag ISBN 978-393908-094-7
- Schwartz, Simon (2012) Packeis. Berlin: Avant-verlag ISBN 978-393908-052-7
- Schwartz, Simon (2009) drüben!. Berlin: Avant-verlag ISBN 978-393908-037-4

== Exhibitions ==
- Simon Schwartz: "Das Parlament - 45 Leben für die Demokratie". An exhibition at the Bundestag (German Parliament), Berlin, 4 April - 31 August 2019. Biographies, in comic form, of 45 German politicians from the time of the Frankfurt Parliament in 1848 until German reunification in 1990. The project was commissioned by the Arts Council of the German Parliament.
- Simon Schwartz: "Das Parlament". An exhibition at the Bundestag, Berlin, 5 September 2017 - 21 January 2018. Biographies of 20 German members of Parliament, from 1848 to 1933, told in comic form.
- Simon Schwartz: "Geschichtsbilder – Comics & Graphic Novels". Exhibition from 18 May - 9 September 2018, Angermuseum Erfurt and 29 September 2019 - 21 January 2020, Ludwiggalerie, Schloss Oberhausen.

== Awards ==
- 2012 - Max & Moritz Prize - Best German language comic for Packeis
- 2016 - Independent Publisher Book Awards, Multicultural Non-fiction Juvenvile-Young Adult section - Silver medal for The Other Side of the Wall
