= Egmont Ehapa =

German publishing house

Egmont Ehapa (officially Egmont Ehapa Media GmbH since 2014; formerly Ehapa Verlag) is a German publishing company. It is a subsidiary of the Egmont Group.

Ehapa is known as a multi-faceted publisher of various kinds of digital and print media, including magazines, comics, books, movies, and even television shows. Egmont is commercially active in 21 different countries and, as of 2005, had approximately 3,600 employees and a yearly revenue of 1.2 billion euros.

== History ==
Egmont Ehapa was created in 1951, as a subsidiary of Egmont (then known as Gutenberghus). The name "Ehapa" was taken from the initials of its founder: Egmont Harald Petersen.

Some of the more popular German-language comics published by Egmont Ehapa Verlag GmbH include: Asterix, Lucky Luke, Donald Duck, Mickey Mouse, Winnie the Pooh, Wendy and SpongeBob SquarePants.

In September 2001, Egmont Interactive made a surprise announcement that it would discontinue its business activities as of September 30, 2001. The games distributed by Egmont Interactive and the joint label Shoebox were continued by dtp entertainment. The closure of Egmont Interactive was justified by worldwide restructuring at Egmont Ehapa Verlag. Only one of five employees was kept on within the publishing company, the other four employees were laid off.

Several of the publisher's publications have been awarded the Max and Moritz Prize.
