= David Turba =

German voice actor

David Turba is a German voice actor. He is best known as the voice of Jun Manjōme in the German dub of Yu-Gi-Oh! GX.

== Roles ==
=== Television animation ===
- Avatar: The Last Airbender (Sokka (Jack DeSena))
- Cardcaptor Sakura (Syaoran Li (Motoko Kumai))
- Ed, Edd n Eddy (Edd (Samuel Vincent))
- Fullmetal Alchemist (Edward Elric (Romi Park))
- Mobile Suit Gundam SEED (Arnold Neumann (Isshin Chiba))
- My Life as a Teenage Robot (Brad Carbunkle (Chad Doreck))
- Peacemaker Kurogane (Okita Sōji (Mitsuki Saiga))
- Recess (Michael "Mikey" Blumberg (Jason Davis))
- Watership Down (Fiver (Andrew Falvey))
- W.I.T.C.H. (Matt Olsen (Jason Marsden))
- Wolf's Rain (Toboe (Hiroki Shimowada))
- X (Nataku (Motoko Kumai))
- Yu-Gi-Oh! Duel Monsters (Leonhart von Schroider (Seiko Noguchi))
- Yu-Gi-Oh! GX (Jun Manjōme (Taiki Matsuno))

=== Live action ===
- Disturbia (Kale (Shia LaBeouf))
- Entourage (Vincent Chase (Adrian Grenier))
- Everwood (Ephram Brown (Gregory Smith))
- Hairspray (Link Larkin (Zac Efron))
- The Hills Have Eyes (Bobby Carter (Dan Byrd))
- Jack Frost (Rory Buck (Taylor Handley))
- Indiana Jones and the Kingdom of the Crystal Skull (Mutt Williams (Shia LaBeouf))
- Lonely Hearts (Eddie Robinson (Dan Byrd))
- Nip/Tuck (Matt McNamara (John Hensley))
- Prison Break (David "Tweener" Apolskis (Lane Garrison))
- Queer as Folk (Justin Taylor (Randy Harrison))
- Terminator 3: Rise of the Machines (Bill Anderson (Brian Sites))
- The Texas Chainsaw Massacre: The Beginning (Dean (Taylor Handley))
- Transformers (Sam Witwicky (Shia LaBeouf))
- Veronica Mars (Wallace Fennel (Percy Daggs III))
