= Reprodukt =

German comic book and graphic novel publisher

Reprodukt is a German comic book and graphic novel publisher headquartered in Berlin.

== History ==
Reprodukt was founded by Dirk Rehm in 1991. Rehm chose the name—the German word for "reproduce"—because he viewed the printed pages of published comics as reproductions of the original artwork. Entering the industry with a German-language republication of the Hernandez brothers' Love and Rockets established the company's focus on alternative comics, especially avant-garde works by comic creators with distinctive styles. Many of their published titles are autobiographical works targeted at educated, middle-class adult readers, although they also release children's comics. One such series, "Kiste", a story about an animated cardboard box, has been one of their bestsellers.

Reprodukt has published comic books by American comic artists including Charles Burns, Dan Clowes, and Craig Thompson, New Zealander Dylan Horrocks, and Austrian artist Nicolas Mahler, as well as German comic book creators such as Mawil Anna Haifisch and Barbara Yelin

== Impact ==
Since its founding, Reprodukt has grown to become one of Germany's largest and most important comic book publishers. The majority of the company's releases have been licensed republication of previously published works. By doing so, especially by republishing works in translation, they have made foreign artists more accessible to German-speaking audiences. At times, this process of translation and republication is transformative rather than merely editorial, changing elements such as "binding, paper quality, format, and ... cost" that can alter readers' impressions of the works. Some artists, such as Mahler, have even produced additional content specifically for Reprodukt editions.

Both the company itself and its published works have been recognized with a variety of awards. Reprodukt received one of the Berlin Publishing Prize's sponsorship awards in 2018, and a seal of quality from the German Publishing Prize four times between 2019 and 2023. In 2020, Rehm received the K.-H Zillmer Publisher Prize for Reprodukt's role in introducing graphic novels to German culture.
