= Birgit Weyhe =

German cartoonist (b. 1969)

Birgit Weyhe, born 1969 in Munich, is a German cartoonist and illustrator.

== Biography ==
Weyhe was born in Munich and spent her childhood in Uganda and Kenya. After taking the German college entrance exams, known as the Abitur, she returned at the age of nineteen to Germany and completed a Magister in German Literature and History in Konstanz and Hamburg. From 2002 to 2008 she completed an additional course of study in illustration with Anke Feuchtenberger at the Hamburg University of Applied Sciences.

Weyhe lives and works in Hamburg where she is also employed as a lecturer in the design department of the Hamburg University of Applied Sciences.

In 2007 Weyhe competed in the Fumetto Comix-Festival in Lucerne obtaining the second place prize for the competition theme of Future and in 2009 she participated in the at Next-Comic Festival in Linz, taking home the first-place prize.

For the Goethe Institute, Weyhe has organized workshops concerning her work in Montréal (Canada), Montevideo (Uruguay) and Córdoba (Argentina). In 2012 she participated in a several week-long Goethe Institute exchange program for comics artists in São Paulo (Brazil) teil. The Polish Goethe Institute recommends Birgit Weyhe's Graphic Novel Im Himmel ist Jahrmarkt as a primary material to support learning the German language and offers it in a didactically commented form for download on its homepage.

== Awards ==
- 2007: Second place at the Fumetto Comix-Festival in Lucerne.
- 2009: First place at the Nextcomic-Festival in Linz
- 2015: Comic Book Prize of the Berthold Leibinger Stiftung for the graphic novel Madgermanes
- 2016: Max & Moritz Prize for „Best German-language Comic“ for Madgermanes

== Selected works ==
- Ich weiß, Mami Verlag, Berlin 2008.
- Frozen Ititi, Excerpt from Frozen Charly, Mami Verlag, 2010, .pdf (downloadable)
- Reigen: Eine Erzählung in zehn Kapiteln, Avant-Verlag, Berlin 2011, ISBN 978-3-939080-57-2.
- La Ronde: Une histoire en dix chapitres (französische Ausgabe von Reigen), Cambourakis, Paris 2013, ISBN 978-2-916589-97-8.
- Im Himmel ist Jahrmarkt, Johann Ullrich und Birgit Weyhe, Avant-Verlag, Berlin 2013, ISBN 978-3-939080-81-7.
- Madgermanes, Avant-Verlag, Berlin 2016, ISBN 978-3-945034-42-2.
