= Anke Feuchtenberger =

German artist and cartoonist

Anke Feuchtenberger (born 1963, in East Berlin) is a German artist and cartoonist. She studied at the Kunsthochschule Berlin. Since 1997, she has held a professorship for drawing at the Hamburg University of Applied Sciences. She is a mother and grandmother and lives and works in Hamburg and Vorpommern.

== See also ==
- List of German women artists
- Simon Schwartz (artist)
