= Reinhard Kleist =

German graphic designer and cartoonist

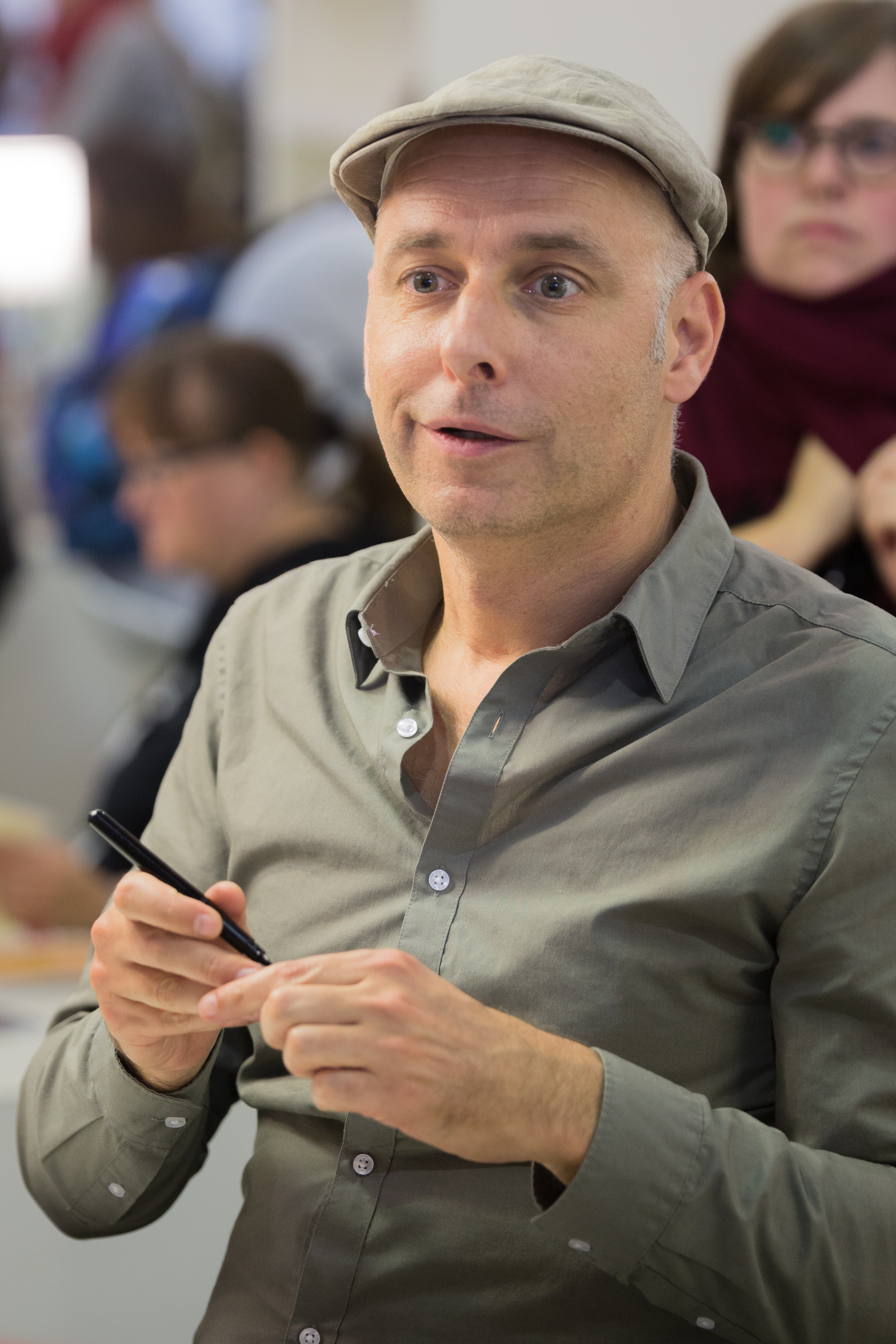
Reinhard Kleist at the Frankfurt Book Fair 2017

Reinhard Kleist (born 11 February 1970, Hürth, Germany) is a German graphic designer and cartoonist.

== Life ==
Kleist studied graphic design at the Fachhochschule Münster. There he created his albums "Lovecraft," "Dorian" and as a thesis "Abenteur eines Weichenstellers". After finishing his degree he moved to Berlin. In 1996, at the International Comics Salon in Erlangen, he won the Max-and-Moritz-Prize for the best German-language Comic Album. Since 2003 he has been working together with author Tobias O. Meißner on the comics series "Berlinoir," which is published with Edition 52.

In September 2006, Kleist's biography on Elvis Presley was released with the title "Elvis." In 2008, Kleist learned Spanish to travel to Cuba, where he drew and sketched street scenes from Havana, which he compiled in the graphic novel "Havanna" in 2007.

In 2011, his book "Der Boxer" (The Boxer) was released, which tells the story of Jewish Boxer Harry Haft. In 2013, he began to publish a comic based on anecdotes and legends from Berlin in the magazine Zitty. The material was published as the book Berliner Mythen in 2016. Kleist's graphic novel about the Somali runner Samia Yusuf Omar was published in 2015 under the title "Der Traum von Olympia" (The Dream of Olympia). Several of his books have been translated into English, French or Arabic.

== Selected works ==
- Minna. 1994
- Lovecraft. 1994
- Das Festmahl. 1995
- Dorian. 1996
- Amerika. 1998
- Fucked. 2000
- Steeplechase. 2001
- Paul. 2001
- Das Grauen im Gemäuer. 2002
- Berlinoir. Band 1: Scherbenmund.
- Berlinoir. Band 2: Mord! 2004
- Cash – I See a Darkness. 2006
- ELVIS – Die illustrierte Biographie. 2007
- The Secrets of Coney Island. 2007
- Berlinoir. Band 3: Narbenstadt. 2008
- Havanna. 2008
- Castro. 2010
- Der Boxer. Die wahre Geschichte des Hertzko Haft. Carlsen, Hamburg 2011, ISBN 978-3-551-78697-5. (Translated into English in 2014)
- Reinhard Osteroth, Text: 1914. Ein Maler zieht in den Krieg. Aladin Verlag, Hamburg 2014, ISBN 978-3-84890078-7
- Der Traum von Olympia. Die Geschichte von Samia Yusuf Omar. Carlsen, Hamburg 2015, ISBN 978-3-551-73639-0
- Berliner Mythen. Carlsen, Hamburg 2016, ISBN 978-3-551-72815-9
- Nick Cave: Mercy on Me, 2017 — a graphic biography of musician Nick Cave
