= Entoman =

Fictional anthropomorphic duck

Entoman is a fictional character created by David Füleki. He is an anthropomorphic duck with superhuman powers who has major or minor roles in many comic books.

== Characteristics ==
According to his creator, Entoman is the incarnation of Siegmund Freud's id, which means that he does everything he wants without being bound by his conscience. Furthermore, Entoman often shows very crude forms of brutality but also high intelligence and even childish behavior. His only weakness may be his desire for ice cream.

== Major Appearances ==
- 78 Tage auf der Straße des Hasses a.k.a. Manga-Madness: 78 Tage auf der Straße des Hasses (since 2008, Delfinium Prints; 2012, Tokyopop)
- Super Epic Brawl Omega (since 2009, Shounen Go!Go!)
- Entomans Eiscreme-Party der tödlichen Sünden (2009, Delfinium Prints)
- Entomans fröhliche (aber leider auch tödliche) Weihnachten (2010, in e-Comix #3 by UndergroundComix)
- Blutrotkäppchen a.k.a. Manga-Madness: Blutrotkäppchen (2010, Comicstars; 2010, Delfinium Prints; 2012, Tokyopop)
- Entoman vs. Aprilwetter (2010, Comicstars; 2011, Delfinium Prints)
- Entoman: Serial Sausage Slaughter a.k.a. Manga-Madness: Serial Sausage Slaughter (2010, Comicstars; 2011, Tokyopop)

== Awards ==
- ICOM Independent Comic Preis 2011: praising mention for the first Entoman book Blutrotkäppchen
- Sondermann 2011: category: best webcomic for Entoman: Serial Sausage Slaughter
- ICOM Independent Comic Preis 2012: outstanding artwork
