= PIQ =

PIQ or Piq may refer to:

- PiQ (magazine), a short-lived American popular culture magazine
- Performance IQ, a sub-type of an intelligence test
- Prefetch input queue, pre-fetched computer instructions stored in a data structure
- Property Information Questionnaire, a document completed by the seller of a property in the UK
