= List of manga magazines published outside Japan =

The following is a list of notable manga magazines that were, and are published outside Japan. Not all magazines abroad published their own manga or had the rights to serialize manga originally published in Japan. To qualify for this list, the magazine has to have serialized manga included, or have a section discussing manga. Manga discussion can either be through reviews, or upcoming manga release info in detail. All magazine titles are written the same way in English, unless otherwise noted.

- Most recent issue published only online

Name	Language	Country	First published	Last published	Frequency	Publisher	Description
A-CLUB (A-CLUB 動畫俱樂部)	Traditional Chinese	British Hong Kong; Hong Kong SAR, China	1986	2001	Bi-weekly	Lam Caa-lei group	A-CLUB was a magazine that was published in Hong Kong until 2001. Its main topic included Japanese anime, manga and the Japanese video game industry.
Action Hiken	Brazilian Portuguese	Brazil	2015		Monthly	Estúdio Armon	A monthly anthology to reveal new talent in the national market, this magazine is very similar to Weekly Shōnen Jump, as it features the Table of Contest system and releases print for popular works.
AmeriManga	English	Canada; United States	2002	2003	Monthly	Studio Ironcat	Published by Studio Ironcat, Amerimanga was a short lived magazine that focused on original English-language manga.
AnimaniA	German	Germany	1994		Bi-Monthly	Animagine GmbH	Germany's oldest manga magazine, AnimaniA has been in publication for over 20 years. The magazine talks about the industry in general which also includes anime/pop culture.
Anime	Finnish	Finland	2005	2017	Semi-quarterly	H-Town Oy	This magazine focused on mainly anime, but also had info on manga, and pop culture.
Anime Insider	English	Canada; United States	2001	2009	Monthly	Wizard Entertainment	Published by Wizard, this magazine mainly focused on anime, but had upcoming manga release info as well as talk about Japanese culture. Publication ceased on March 26, 2009, with staff layoffs.
Anime UK	English	United Kingdom	1991	1996	Monthly	Ashdown Publishing	Anime UK was a magazine that was published in the early/mid 1990s that focused on Japanese animation/culture. Notable people who worked for the magazine include Jonathan Clements, James Swallow, and Helen McCarthy.
Animerica	English	Canada; United States	1992	2005	Monthly	Viz Media	Animerica was a popular magazine that focused on anime and manga titles, as well as related works.
Animerica Extra	English	Canada; United States	1998	2004	Monthly	Viz Media	This magazine was a complement to its monthly review magazine Animerica. The target audience was intended to be for young females. Serialized titles include Banana Fish, Marionette Generation, and Video Girl Ai among others.
Animonster	Indonesia	Bandung; Indonesia	1999	2014	Monthly	Megindo Tunggal Sejahtera	This magazine focused on manga drawing, learning talk in Japanese language, anime previews, Kathleen's corner, lifestyle, cosplay events, tokusatsu, sneak peek upcoming manga, etc.
Aniway	Dutch	Netherlands; Belgium	1999	2023	Quarterly	Aniway Foundation	This magazine focused on anime, manga, and Japanese pop culture in general.
Arigato Magazine	Polish	Poland	2008		Quarterly	Studio Lain	Arigato talks about the latest anime and manga releases to come out of Japan.
Banzai!	German	Germany	2001	2005	Monthly	Carlsen Verlag	Banzai! was the German adaptation of the Japanese magazine Weekly Shōnen Jump. The magazine serialized manga titles from WSJ, as well as some original German manga-influenced comics.
Be x Boy	French	France	2009	2012	Bi-Monthly	Asuka	Be x Boy was a magazine that was a French adaptation of its Japanese counterpart.
B's LOG	Spanish	Spain	2009	2011	Monthly	Planeta DeAgostini	Published for two years, B's LOG focused on manga releases, and Japanese pop culture.
Co-co! Magazine	Chinese	Hong Kong SAR, China	1997		Weekly	Rightman Publishing	Co-co! is a magazine that has been published in Hong Kong for almost 20 years. It includes its own Chinese-influenced comics.
Comic Champ (코믹챔프)	Korean	South Korea	1991		Bi-weekly	Daewon C.I.	Comic Champ specializes in serializations of domestic Korean and imported Japanese comics. Titles serialized in Comic Champ are collected into volumes and published under the Champ Comics imprint.
Daisuki	German	Germany	2003	2012	Monthly	Carlsen Verlag	This magazine was a German manga anthology for girls, publication lasted until May 2012 with the final issue.
Hanalala	Indonesian	Indonesia	2006	2010	Monthly	Elex Media Komputindo	Hanalala was the Indonesian version of the manga magazines Hana to Yume and LaLa. Its target was a young female readership.
Kawaii	Polish	Poland	1997 2018 (relaunch)	2005 2020 (second cancelation)	Monthly	The Future Network	Kawaii was a Polish magazine that had manga reviews, as well as info on Japanese culture. The magazine was suspended in 2005 due to poor sales. Kawaii returned in 2018 and has been cancelled another time in 2020, because of COVID-19 pandemic and financial problems of press market caused by it.
Kids Zone	German	Germany	2000	2011	Monthly	Computec Media	Kids Zone dealt with anime, manga, and trading cards for children.
Kiseki	English	Australia	2009	2012	Bi-Monthly	Independent	In addition to reviews, Kiseki also serialized several different dōjinshi series including Death & Fairy and Just in Time!.
Kreko Komik Remaja	Bahasa Malaysia	Malaysia	1999	2019	Irregular	Comics Media	Kreko Komik Remaja or Kreko is a Malaysian magazine published every ten days; 80% of its readership is male.
Koneko	German	Germany	2004		Bi-Monthly	Raptor Publishing	Published bi-monthly, Koneko talks about Japanese pop culture, and has news about the newest anime and manga series that come out from Japan.
RAN	Spanish	Argentina	1994	1998	Bi-Monthly	Independent	RAN (acronym of Robot Argentino Nipón) was a magazine about Japanese animation. It started as a fanzine and gained a more professional look since its fifth issue. The publication consisted of 18 issues.
Lazer	Spanish	Argentina	2008	2009	Irregular	Editorial Ivrea	Lazer was a magazine that specialized in anime, comics, manga, series and other media. It ceased publication in 2009 due to copyright issues.
Manga Artist	English	United Kingdom	2014		Annually	Future plc	Part of ImagineFX, this magazine mainly has art tops for manga artists, but also discusses the manga industry.
Manga Max (formerly Manga Mania)	English	United Kingdom	1993	2000	Monthly	Dark Horse Comics, Manga Entertainment, Titan Magazines	Manga Mania began in 1993, and primarily featured serialised comics, as well as anime and manga news and reviews. It was re-launched as Manga Max in 1998, and folded in 2000. Notable staff included Helen McCarthy and Jonathan Clements.
Manga Mover	English	United Kingdom	2004	2004	Published once	Diamond Distributors	This magazine was only published once, it featured works from "upcoming" manga artists from Japan.
Mangajin (漫画人)	English	Canada; United States	1990	1997	Monthly	Mangajin	Mangajin was a magazine for students of Japanese language and culture. The magazine also featured manga such as What's Michael?
Mangaphile	English	Canada; United States	1999	2004	Quarterly	Radio Comix	Mangaphile published Amerimanga and featured reviews with artists such as Adam Warren, Fred Perry, and Kenichi Sonoda. Publication ended in July 2004.
Manga Power	German	Germany	1996	2004	Bi-Monthly	Egmont Manga and Anime	The first version of Manga Twister ran from 1996 to 1997 and the second version from 2002 to 2004.
Manga Twister	German	Germany	2003	2006	Bi-Monthly	Egmont Manga and Anime	Manga Twister ran mainly shōjo and shōnen titles that were adapted for a German audience.
Mangazine	English	Canada; United States	1985	2005	Monthly	Antarctic Press	Mangazine was a long-running magazine that was published by Antarctic Press. Its focus was American manga compilations (Amerimanga).
Mangazine	Italian	Italy	1989	1995	Monthly	Granata Press	Mangazine is also the name of an Italian magazine that was published mainly in the early 1990s. The magazine featured information about manga and related Japanese culture.
MyM	English	United Kingdom	2012	2018	Monthly	MCM Expo Group	This magazine originally focused on various aspects of Japanese pop culture including manga, but has since become a full entertainment magazine.
Nakayoshi Gress	Indonesian	Indonesia	2004	2017	Monthly	Elex Media Komputindo	Nakayoshi Gress was an Indonesian adaptation of the shōjo magazine Nakayoshi.
Neo	English	United Kingdom; Ireland	2004	2024	Monthly	Uncooked Media	Neo focused primarily on anime and East Asian cinema.
Newtype Korea (뉴타입)	Korean	South Korea	1999	2014	Monthly	Daewon C.I.	Newtype Korea was a Korean adaptation of the magazine Newtype with added emphasis on domestic Korean animation projects.
Newtype USA	English	United States	2002	2008	Monthly	A.D. Vision	Newtype USA was an English adaptation of the magazine Newtype which featured anime and manga reviews.
Otaku	Polish	Poland	2006		Monthly	Studio JG	This magazine talks about anime & manga series, it came into existence after the collapse of the manga magazine Kawaii.
Otaku USA	English	Canada; United States	2007		Bi-monthly	Sovereign Media	Otaku USA first started in 2007, and focuses on anime, manga, and Japanese pop culture. Notable reviewers include Jason Thompson and Shaenon K. Garrity.
OzTAKU	English	Australia	2004	2007	Unknown	Independent	OzTAKU was an anthology magazine that published dōjinshi. Artists included Ian C. Thomas among others.
PiQ	English	United States	2008	2008	Monthly	A.D. Vision	PiQ was a magazine that was a replacement for Newtype USA that had ceased publication. After only 4 issues though PiQ itself folded with a final issue in July, 2008.
Play	English	United States	2002	2010	Monthly	Fusion Publishing	Play was a U.S.-based magazine that focused on video games, manga, anime, and other media such as film and television, comics, and music.
Protoculture Addicts	English	Canada; United States	1987	2008	Irregular	Protoculture Inc.	Protoculture Addicts was a Canadian-based anime and manga themed magazine. It was later acquired by Anime News Network, but eventually ceased publication in 2008.
Pulp	English	Canada; United States	1997	2002	Monthly	Viz Media	Pulp was a monthly manga anthology that was marketed at adults rather than teenage readers. Some of titles serialized in the magazine included: Uzumaki, Banana Fish, and Dance Till Tomorrow.
Raijin Comics	English	Canada; United States	2002	2004	Monthly	Gutsoon! Entertainment	Rajin published, and imprinted several titles that included Bomber Girl and Fist of the North Star before going on hiatus in 2004. The magazine is considered defunct after losing its website domain.
Shojo Beat	English	Canada; United States	2005	2009	Monthly	Viz Media	Shojo Beat serialized several different shōjo manga series in English before ceasing publication in July 2009. Viz stated that the "difficult economic climate" was behind the cancellation.
Shonen Jump	English	Canada; United States	2002	2012	Monthly	Viz Media	Various English language shōnen manga series were serialized in Shonen Jump. The magazine was discontinued in 2012 when it went digital under the name Weekly Shonen Jump.
Shonen Jump	Norwegian	Norway	2005	2007	Monthly	Schibsted Förlag AB	This was a Norwegian language edition of Weekly Shōnen Jump. Two short imprints were published which were titled "En Bok Fra Shonen Jump" and "Dragon Ball Ekstra" (Dragon Ball Extra). A film comic was also released under the "TV Anime Comic" imprint.
Shonen Jump	Swedish	Sweden	2005	2007	Monthly	Bonnier Carlsen	This was a Swedish language edition of Weekly Shōnen Jump. The magazine included chapters from various Weekly Shōnen Jump titles before being discontinued in 2007.
Shonen Magz	Indonesian	Indonesia	2004	2013	Monthly	Elex Media Komputindo	Shonen Magz was the Indonesian version of the Japanese Weekly Shōnen Magazine. Various shōnen manga titles were published before it was cancelled in July 2013.
Shonen Star	Indonesian	Indonesia	2005	2013	Semi-monthly	Elex Media Komputindo	Shōnen Star was the Indonesian version of Weekly Shōnen Sunday. The magazine published titles such as Kurozakuro, Robot Boys, My Wing, and Midori Days before being cancelled in November 2013.
Smile	English	Canada; United States	1998	2002	Monthly	Tokyopop	Smile was a magazine aimed at a young female readership. Titles serialized in the magazine included Sailor Moon and Peach Girl.
Starz	Malaysian	Malaysia	2004	2008	Semi-monthly	Art Square Group	Starz contained articles that were about the latest anime, manga, and anime-related things such as DVDs, OSTs, and toys. Serialized series included Helios Eclipse and Fatal Chaos.
Super Manga Blast!	English	Canada; United States	2000	2005	Weekly	Dark Horse Comics	Super Manga Blast! was a manga anthology that ran for 59 issues before being discontinued.
Tokyopop (formerly MixxZine)	English	Canada; United States	1997	2000	Monthly	Tokyopop	MixxZine originally started as a magazine aimed towards a young female readership before changing its name to Tokyopop and switching to more information on Asian culture. The magazine published several manga series in English including Sailor Moon and Magic Knight Rayearth.
Weekly Comic (漫画周刊)	Mandarin	Malaysia	1991		Weekly	Comics Media	Weekly Comic is a weekly manga magazine based in Malaysia that serializes manga that was originally published in Japan. The magazine is aimed at Chinese readership.
Weekly Passion Times (熱血少年月刊)	Chinese	China	2013		Weekly	Passion Times	This magazine is used by Hong Kong-based manga creators as a platform to release their works. In 2014, the magazine was forced to apologize after publishing content that was deemed as obscene in China.
Weekly Shonen Jump (formerly Weekly Shõnen Jump Alpha)	English	Canada; United States	2012	2018	Weekly	Viz Media	Weekly Shonen Jump was a digital magazine that serialized English language adaptations of manga originally published in Japan. The magazine published its final digital magazine issue and launched the Shonen Jump digital vault membership on December 10, 2018. Following the succession, a global version of Shonen Jump+ launched on January 28, 2019, called Manga Plus by Shueisha.
Xuan Xuan	English	Australia	2003	2006	Tri-annual	Independent	Xuan Xuan was a magazine that was a collection of short serialized manga produced by amateur Australian writers and artists.
Yen Plus	English	Canada; United States	2008	2013	Monthly	Yen Press	Yen Plus was a magazine that ran several different manga series before ending in December, 2013.

== See also ==
- List of manga magazines
- List of Japanese manga magazines by circulation
- List of manga distributors
