= Daisuki (magazine) =

German manga magazine

- Categories: Manga, Shōjo
- Frequency: Monthly
- Circulation: 215,000 (2008)
- First issue: January 2003
- Final issue: June 2012
- Company: Carlsen Verlag
- Country: Germany
- Language: German
- Website: daisuki-online.de

Daisuki was a German manga anthology for girls published by Carlsen Verlag. It was the first girl's comics (shojo manga) magazine published outside Asia. One edition was about 256 pages long and costs 5.95 Euros in Germany. The chief editor for Daisuki was Anne Berling. Due to declining sales figures, the magazine was discontinued.

== Overview ==
Carlsen began publishing Daisuki in January 2003. The company also owned other German manga magazines, Dragon Ball and Banzai!.

== See also ==
- List of manga magazines published outside of Japan
