= David Füleki =

German comic artist

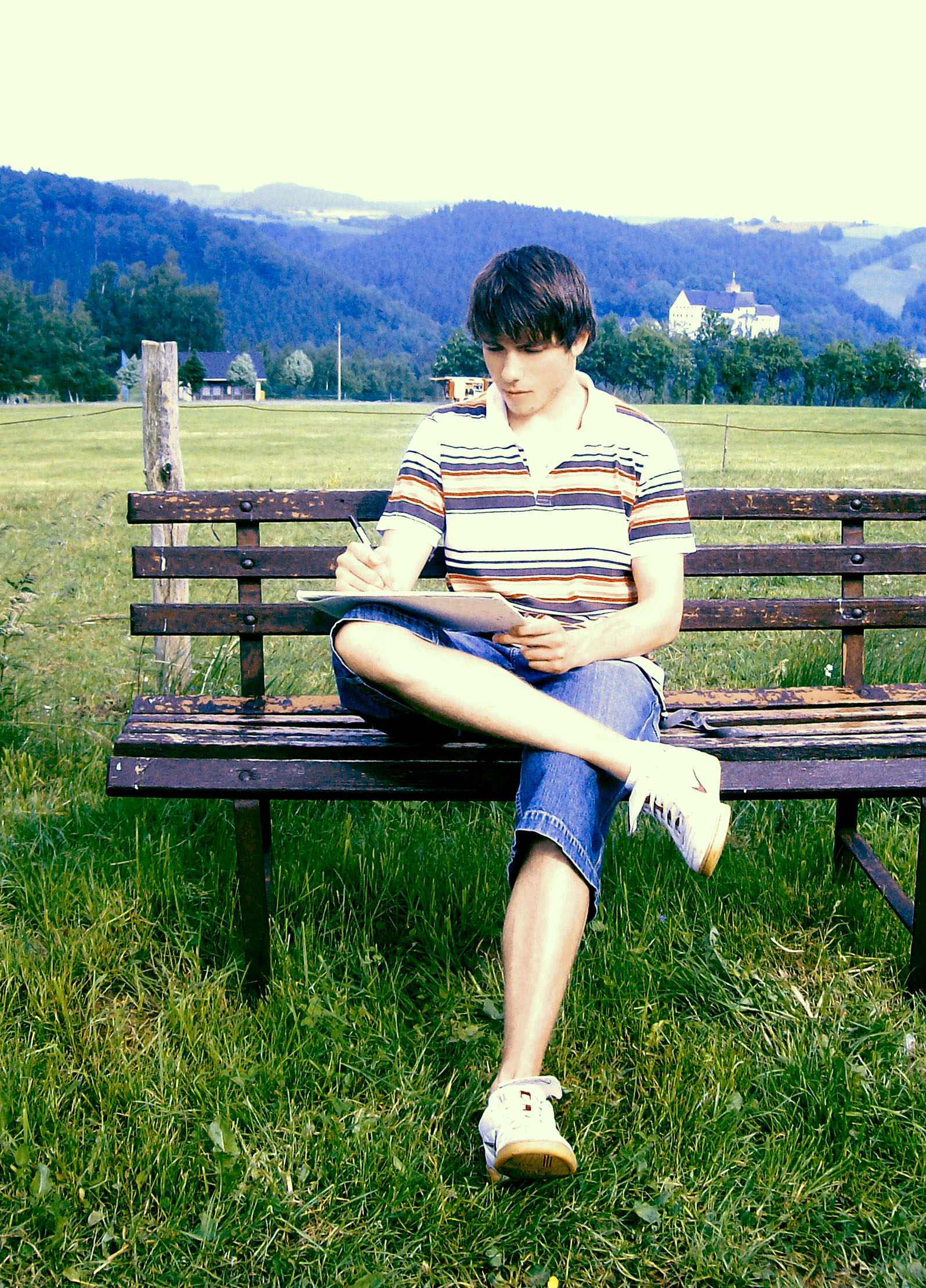
- Born: August 24, 1985 (age 41) Zschopau, East Germany
- Area: cartoonist
- Pseudonyms: Def, Yeo, Fülecki the Kid
- Notable works: Struwwelpeter: Die Rückkehr, Struwwelpeter: Das große Buch der Störenfriede, 78 Tage auf der Straße des Hasses
- Awards: winner of the Comic Duell 2008, doujinshi and weapon creator contest winner of the magazine BANZAI!, ICOM Independent Comic Preis (ensemble award shared with other artists), Sondermann, PENG! Award, German Influencer Award
- www.instagram.com/davidfueleki

David Füleki (born 24 August 1985 in Zschopau, East Germany) is a German comic artist. His comics were and are published by the publishing houses Carlsen Verlag, Tokyopop, New Ground Publishings, Delfinium Prints, the manga anthology Shounen Go! Go! and many others. Besides his occupation as a comic author Füleki studies media communication at Chemnitz University of Technology. He also invented the popular character Entoman.

== Publications ==
=== One Shots ===
- Vereinigung der Superkrieger introducing Toh-Fu (2001, in the fourth issue of BANZAI!)
- Apokalypse am Wochenende (2002, in the first issue of Manga Talente)
- Like a Hero (2003, in the second issue of Tokyopop's Manga Talente)
- Die Gabe (2005, in the 50th (and final) issue of BANZAI!)
- Die höchst fragwürdige Resozialisierung des Wilbert Plumduff oder Die Rückkehr der Robo-Affen (2006, in the second issue of Manga Fieber)
- Itsy bitsy Spider (2008, published in the first issue of Unheimlich Manhwa)
- Monsterjagd (2008, in the third issue of Comicgate-magazine; 2011, in Fool on the Hill #14)
- The Big L (2008, in the second issue of Shounen Go!Go!; 2009, by Delfinium Prints)
- Happy Birthday Zombie (2009, in the first issue of Fallout Girl, published by Delfinium Prints)
- Entomans Eiscreme-Party der tödlichen Sünden (2009, Delfinium Prints)
- Familiensache? (2010, published by IKOS and Delfinium Prints)
- Unsichtbare Monster (2010, in the second issue of Baito Oh!)
- Entomans fröhliche (aber leider auch tödliche) Weihnachten (2010, Delfinium Prints; 2010 in UndergroundComix online-anthology eComix #3)
- Tristesse, Beton und Menschlichkeit (2010, three different versions published in Fool on the Hill #13, in JAZAM! #5 and by Delfinium Prints)
- Aiko x Yuuki - Ausklang einer bittersüßen Leidenschaft (2010, in the 10th anniversary edition auf Animexx anthology Manga-Mixx)
- O Tannenbaum (2010 in UndergroundComix Weihnachts Horror Comix)
- Jingle Bells (2010 in UndergroundComix Weihnachts Horror Comix)
- Im Namen der Forschung (2011, in Animexx' anthology Manga-Mixx 8)
- Blutrotkäppchen (complete edition, 2011, Delfinium Prints)
- G. Jäger des Gräfenberg-Vermächtnisses (2011, Comicgate-Magazin #6)
- Friendly Neighborhood Rickshaw Boy: Bank Job (2011, JAZAM! #6)
- Friendly Neighborhood Taxi Family (2011, JAZAM! #6)
- Heilandstaufe (2012, JAZAM! #7)
- Der alte zynische Bastard und das feine Leben (2012, JAZAM! Der Sinn des Lebens)
- Kesse Disco-Schlampen und die Schneckokalypse (2012, in Animexx anthology Manga-Mixx 9)
- Beppo Biber: Wie entstehen Wolken? (2013, in JAZAM! #8)
- Die letzte ihrer Art (2013, in Perry - Unser Mann im All #141 as well as in Comix 9/2013; cooperation with Andreas Völlinger und Martin Geier)
- Fickschnittchen Schneewittchen (2014, in Hentai-Mixx Runde 2)
- Auris (2014, in Perry - Erlangen Ashcan-Special #2)
- Quadrillion Raging Fists Apollo. Final Chapter: The Fall (2014, in JAZAM! #9)
- Hipsters vs. Killer-Robosaurus and Hipsters vs. Pokémon (2014, in Hipsters vs. by Adrian vom Baur)
- Zombie Movie (2014, in Dead Ends; cooperation with Michel Decomain)
- Das X markiert den Schatz (oder: Entoman vs. Niereninsuffizienz) (2015, in JAZAM! #10)
- Ahornella die Fischdamenfrau (2015, in Krakel Komik. Meerjungfrauen, Nymphen, Nixon)
- Mutters gelber Schirm (2015, Delfinium Prints)
- Entoman: Amikoverse Heroes (seit 2015, Delfinium Prints; bisher zwei Teile erschienen)
- Allani Persephone (2015, Delfinium Prints)
- Biorogie. Das Nudel Hugi lebt! (2016, in Krakel Komik. Bio)
- Nobo mit der Spitzhacke gegen Rokatrix (2016, in JAZAM! #11)
- Random Quest for 27 magische Wunschdrachen-Artefakte (2016 in Manga-Mixx 10)
- Another Christmas Carol (2016, Delfinium Prints)
- Saga of Eternity Crystals. Legend of Spielstand 2 (2017, in JAZAM! #12)
- Entoman vs. Work-Life-Balance (2017, in Krakel Komik. Mach's dir selbst!)
- Entoman. Süßes oder Saures, Miau! (2017, Delfinium Prints)
- Definition von Albtraum (2018, in JAZAM! Schreckgeschichten)
- Die Wunder des Krakel (2019, in Krakel Komik. Das 5. Buch Krakel)
- Das Martyrium des Krakel (2019, in Krakel Komik. Das 5. Buch Krakel)
- JAZAM! The Best (and Worst) of David Füleki (2019, anthology with short stories)

=== Series ===
==== 78 Tage auf der Straße des Hasses ====
- 78 Tage auf der Straße des Hasses #1: Mofi spielt Baseball (2008, published by Delfinium Prints)
- 78 Tage auf der Straße des Hasses #2: Lausbuben Battle Royal (2008, published by Delfinium Prints)
- 78 Tage auf der Straße des Hasses #3: Anderthalb Tage auf der Insel des Hasses (2008, published by Delfinium Prints)
- 78 Tage auf der Straße des Hasses #4: Chicken Melee Style der 1000 Methoden versus Boston Bleach Bones' Nekromantie (2008, Delfinium Prints)
- 78 Tage auf der Straße des Hasses #5: Zombies, Pfaffen, Herz-Konverter (2009, Delfinium Prints)
- 78 Tage auf der Straße des Hasses #6: Gegen die Herren mit Hut (2010, Delfinium Prints)
- 78 Tage auf der Straße des Hasses #7: Night of the dying living Dead (2010, Delfinium Prints)
- 78 Tage auf der Straße des Hasses #8: Kesse Disco-Schlampen reiten die Schwänze des Zorns (2011, Delfinium Prints)
- 78 Tage auf der Straße des Hasses #9: Rosinen-Unverträglichkeit (2011, Delfinium Prints)
- 78 Tage auf der Straße des Hasses #10: Herr Gans kennt keine Gnade! (2011, Delfinium Prints)
- 78 Tage auf der Straße des Hasses #11: 512 (2013, Delfinium Prints)
- 78 Tage auf der Straße des Hasses #12: Grammatik of Doom (2013, Delfinium Prints)
- 78 Tage auf der Straße des Hasses #13: Def vs. Joe (2013, Delfinium Prints)
- 78 Tage auf der Straße des Hasses #14: Vollmond (2013, Delfinium Prints)
- 78 Tage auf der Straße des Hasses #15: Roy vs. Entoman (2014, Delfinium Prints)
- 78 Tage auf der Straße des Hasses #16: "Und ob wir uns kennen" - Im Angesicht des Spielführers ... oder: Der zerfledderte Blutkrüppel gibt sich Mühe (2014, Delfinium Prints)
- 78 Tage auf der Straße des Hasses #17: Gerold Giraffe mit bleihaltigem Asbest-Druckknopf (2014, Delfinium Prints)
- 78 Tage auf der Straße des Hasses #18: Evil Twin (2014, Delfinium Prints)
- 78 Tage auf der Straße des Hasses #19: Barriere (2018, Delfinium Prints)
- 78 Tage auf der Straße des Hasses #20: Backsteini (2018, Delfinium Prints)
- 78 Tage auf der Straße des Hasses - Sonderheft #1 (2010, Delfinium Prints)
- 78 Tage auf der Straße des Hasses - Sonderheft #2 (2010, Delfinium Prints)

==== Dead Guys with the Glasses ====
Part of a comic anthology about the cast of That Guy with the Glasses featuring Doug Walker as the Nostalgia Critic.

- Dead Guys with the Glasses. Volume 1: In the Room (2011, in The That Guy with the Glasses Fancomic)

==== Demon Mind Game ====
- Demon Mind Game 1: Nio (2017, Tokyopop)
- Demon Mind Game 2: Rakhnall (2019, Tokyopop)
- Encyclopaedia Daemonica (2019, companion book)

==== Entoman - Powered by Comicstars ====
Discontinued Series for publisher Droemer Knaur featuring Entoman. The works have been transferred to Tokyopop and Delfinium Prints respectively.

- Blutrotkäppchen #1: Auf dem Weg zur Großmutter (2010, Comicstars)
- Blutrotkäppchen #2: Warum hast du so große Zähne? (2010, Comicstars)
- Blutrotkäppchen #3: Komm schon, alter Mann!! (2010, Comicstars)
- Blutrotkäppchen #4: Märchen-Monster-Massaker (2010, Comicstars)
- Entoman vs. Aprilwetter (2010, Comicstars)
- Entoman: Serial Sausage Slaughter #1: Code Gelb (2010, Comicstars)
- Entoman: Serial Sausage Slaughter #2: Toast Trace (2010, Comicstars)
- Entoman: Serial Sausage Slaughter #3: Toastface (2010, Comicstars)
- Entoman: Serial Sausage Slaughter #4: Crime Core (2010, Comicstars)

==== Infamous Justice Force Strikers ====
A super sentai like action series about a group of former villains who are forced to fight on missions to save the earth.

- Infamous Justice Force Strikers. Mission 001: Feuerbach (2014, Delfinium Prints)

==== Manga-Madness ====
- Blutrotkäppchen (2012, Tokyopop)
- Entoman: Serial Sausage Slaughter (2012, Tokyopop)
- 78 Tage auf der Straße des Hasses #1 (2014, Tokyopop)
- 78 Tage auf der Straße des Hasses #2 (2014, Tokyopop)
- 78 Tage auf der Straße des Hasses #3 (2016, Tokyopop)

==== Roy und die Frauen ====
- 1: Teil 1 bis 20 (2010, Delfinium Prints)

==== Suburbia Highschool ====
- Suburbia Highschool #1: Willkommen an der Suburbia Highschool! (2008, Delfinium Prints)
- Suburbia Highschool #2: Bad Hair Day (2009, Delfinium Prints)
- Suburbia Highschool #3: Leckere Menschenbabys (2009, Delfinium Prints)

==== Struwwelpeter ====
A manga style adaption of Struwwelpeter.

- Struwwelpeter: Die Rückkehr (2009, Tokyopop)
- Struwwelpeter: Das große Buch der Störenfriede (2009, Tokyopop)
- Struwwelpeter in Japan (Free Comic Book Day comic; 2012, Delfinium Prints)

==== Super Epic Brawl Omega ====
- Super Epic Brawl Omega: Meister zwischen den Welten (2009, in the third issue of Shounen Go!Go!; 2009, Delfinium Prints)
- Super Epic Brawl Omega: Auf der Suche nach dem Steinhuhn mit Nagel durch (2009, in the fourth issue of Shounen Go!Go!; 2010, Delfinium Prints)
- Super Epic Brawl Omega: Gesichtselfmeter of Great Justice (2010, in the fifth issue of Shounen Go!Go!; 2011, Delfinium Prints)
- Super Epic Brawl Omega: Angriff auf die Quantengeist NULL (2011, in the sixth issue of Shounen Go!Go!; 2012, Delfinium Prints)
- Super Epic Brawl Omega: Suicide Stockenten Squadron (2011, in issue 7.1 of Shounen Go!Go!; 2013, Delfinium Prints)
- Super Epic Brawl Omega: 16-Bit-Land (2012, in issue 7.2 of Shounen Go! Go!; 2014, Delfinium Prints)

==== tuchfühlung-Comic ====
- Ich und meine TU Chemnitz und umgekehrt: Mein Abenteuer mit dem Herrn Holly (nach einer wahren Geschichte (2007, in the first issue of tuchfühlung)
- Mein letztes Erlebnis mit der Sprachberatung (introducing Robobob) (2007, in the second issue of tuchfühlung)
- Arbeit, Wohlstand und Schönheit: Die Reise in den Goldenen Osten (2007, in the third issue of tuchfühlung)
- Roys Bandprobe mit Spitzenpointe – Introducing Roy als himself (2008, in the fourth issue of tuchfühlung)
- tuchfühlung kontra VOLLKONTAKT (2008, in the fifth issue of tuchfühlung; 2009, in issue 6/2009 of the magazine Animania)
- Willkommen in der Donnerkuppel - Eine verstörende Zukunftsvision bezüglich der TU Chemnitz (2008, in the sixth issue of tuchfühlung; 2009, in issue 6/2009 of the magazine Animania)
- "Nak Nak, Bitches!" Sturm und Drang des ehrwürdigen Entoman (2009, in the seventh issue of tuchfühlung; in issue 6/2009 of the magazine Animania)
- Studieren mit Rind - Muhltikuhltureller Qampusz Chemnitz (2009, in the eighth issue of tuchfühlung; in issue 6/2009 of the magazine Animania)
- Fritz-Heckert-Gebiet relaoded (2009, in the ninth issue of tuchfühlung)
- Letzter Aufschwung Ost (2009, in the tenth issue of tuchfühlung)
- Woher der Nischel (dieser riesige Bronze-Kopf, der da in Chemnitz rumsteht) kommt. Chemnitzer Geschichte - kompakt, aber leider falsch auf einer Seite (2010, in the 11th issue of tuchfühlung)
- Hoppla, ich bin eine Bratwurst! (2010, in the 12th issue of tuchfühlung)
- Klingentanz im Jahr der Ente: Entoman vs. ehrwürdige Schwertkampf-Tradition der Meister des Ostens (2010, in the 13th issue oftuchfühlung)
- Abschaum! Der Comic zum Shirt (2010, in tuchfühlung #14)
- Spuk im Wohnheim. Der Exorzismus des Michael Baumgärtel (2011, in tuchfühlung #15)
- Hipsters vs. Mörder Mensa Mucke (2012, in tuchfühlung #16)
- Auf ans Werk! Def vs. Abschlussarbeit (2012, in tuchfühlung #17)
- Entgelt zahlt Empfänger (2012, in tuchfühlung #18)
- Bis(s) zum Ende des Seminars. Sexy Untote auf dem Campus (2013, in tuchfühlung #19)
- Mach 3000. Der Weihnachtsmann brennt! (2013, in tuchfühlung #20)
- Was ich mal werden will (2014, in tuchfühlung #21)
- Mission to Mars (2015, in tuchfühlung #22)
- 80 m^{2} (2015, in tuchfühlung #23)

== Awards (selection) ==
- Manga-Talente 2003: 3rd place for Like a Hero
- Comic-Duell 2008: Winner
- 1st place BANZAI! doujinshi contest for Die Gabe
- ICOM Independent Comic Preis 2009: special award for Comicgate-Magazin #3
- ICOM Independent Comic Preis 2011: special award for JAZAM! #5
- ICOM Independent Comic Preis 2011: praising mention for Blutrotkäppchen
- PENG! award 2011: best German manga: 2nd place for Struwwelpeter: Die Rückkehr
- Sondermann 2011: best webcomic for Entoman
- 1st place IFA manga contest 2011
- 1st place Marvel/Cinestar X-Men-contest 2011
- 1st place 12 hour comic day 2012 (by myComics) for Struwwelpeter in Japan
- ICOM Independent Comic Preis 2012: best artwork
- AnimaniA Award 2013: 3rd place for Blutrotkäppchen
- PENG! Award for 78 Tage auf der Straße des Hasses
- Goldener Gartenzwerg: 3rd place for 78 Tage auf der Straße des Hasses
- 1st place 12 hour comic day 2015 (by myComics) for Mutters gelber Schirm
- Stiftung Lesen Label for Das Schlaufuchs-Magazin
- ICOM Independent Comic Preis 2018: Best Independent Comic for JAZAM Vol. 12: Spiel including Füleki's short story Saga of Eternity Crystals. Legend of Spielstand 2)
- German Influencer Award 2020: Rising Star (category: Art)
