= Banzai! (magazine) =

Discontinued shōnen manga anthology

- Cover of the 7th issue, with cover date of 5 March 2002
- Categories: manga, shōnen
- Frequency: Monthly
- Circulation: 130,000 (2003)
- First issue: November 2001
- Final issue Number: December 2005; 50
- Company: Carlsen Verlag
- Country: Germany
- Based in: Hamburg
- Language: German

Banzai!, officially stylized BANZAI!, is a discontinued shōnen manga anthology that was published in Germany by Carlsen Verlag, from November 2001 to December 2005. It debuted in November 2001 as a German language adaptation of the popular Japanese manga anthology Weekly Shōnen Jump, published by Shueisha. In addition to various series from Weekly Shōnen Jump, the magazine serialized some original German manga-influenced comics, including Crewman 3. Issues also included educational articles to teach readers Japanese and columns with news updates on anime and manga series. Series published in the magazine were also published in tankōbon volumes under the Banzai! präsentiert and the highly popular series under the Best of Banzai! label. The name Banzai! came from the transliteration of 10,000 years, a traditional Japanese exclamation.

Banzai! was the first German manga magazine aimed at boys. Banzai! initially circulated with 130,000 copies per period.

The magazine was discontinued in December 2005 due to Shueisha declining to renew Carlsen Verlag's license for the adaptation. The German division of Tokyopop was able to acquire the license to publish other tankōbon volumes of the Weekly Shōnen Jump magazine. The already published manga volumes from Banzai! remain under the Banzai! präsentiert line.

== Series ==
=== Manga ===
Title	Author	First Issue	Last Issue
DNA²	Masakazu Katsura	November 2001	March 2003
Hunter × Hunter (Hunter X Hunter)	Yoshihiro Togashi	November 2001	December 2005
Naruto	Masashi Kishimoto	November 2001	December 2005
Sand Land (Sandland)	Akira Toriyama	November 2001	May 2002
One Piece – Rogue Town	Eiichiro Oda	December 2001	September 2002
Shaman King	Hiroyuki Takei	December 2001	December 2005
Neko Majin	Akira Toriyama	June 2002	August 2002
Dr. Slump (Dr. Slump – Neues aus Pinguinhausen)	Akira Toriyama	July 2002	January 2003
Yu-Gi-Oh!	Kazuki Takahashi	September 2002	January 2005
One Piece Red	Eiichiro Oda	April 2003	August 2003
Hikaru no Go (Hikaru No Go)	Yumi Hotta, Takeshi Obata	November 2003	December 2005
Neko Majin Z	Akira Toriyama	April 2004	June 2004
I"s	Masakazu Katsura	February 2005	May 2005
Black Cat	Kentaro Yabuki	June 2005	August 2005

=== Original works ===
In addition to manga series, Banzai! included chapters from a few original German language manga-influenced comics.

Title	Author	First Issue	Last Issue
Halloweens	Isabel Kreitz	November 2001	November 2002
Crewman 3	Robert Labs	January 2003	October 2003
Hakuchi One	Michael Rühle	December 2004	December 2005
Die Gabe	David Füleki	December 2005	December 2005

== See also ==
- List of manga magazines published outside of Japan
