= A-CLUB =

Hong Kong magazine

A-Club
- Issue #2 featuring Plawres Sanshiro
- Editor: Lam Caa-lei (林查理)
- Categories: Anime, Manga, Manhua
- Frequency: Biweekly
- Publisher: Lam Caa-lei group
- First issue: 10 October 1986
- Final issue Number: 25 May 2001; 352
- Country: Hong Kong
- Language: Traditional Chinese

A-CLUB, short for Anime-club, (Chinese: A-CLUB 動畫俱樂部) was a popular magazine in Hong Kong in the 1980s. Its main topics include Japanese anime, manga, and the Japanese video game industry. It also covered some aspects of Hong Kong manhua, and eventually US comics in the later years. It ceased publication in 2001.

== Operation ==
Prior to the internet age in the 1980s and early 1990s, the magazine was one of the main sources for Japanese anime culture materials in Hong Kong. The cover usually featured the hottest topics at the time.

The founding price was HK$10 per issue, it later increased to HK$35.

In its final year the magazine was only able to sell about 3,000 copies.

== See also ==
- List of manga magazines published outside of Japan
