= Property Information Questionnaire =

Document completed by the seller of a property

The Property Information Questionnaire (PIQ) is a document completed by the seller of property in the United Kingdom containing details of utilities and services to the property, access arrangements, council tax bands, changes to the property parking arrangements, damage to the property and leasehold information. The PIQ is a required part of the Home Information Pack (HIP), a set of documents that must be provided before a property in England and Wales can be put on the open market for sale with vacant possession. In December 2008, the Labour Minister for Housing, Margaret Beckett, announced proposals to improve and simplify the consumer content of the HIP. As of 6 April 2009, all newly-commissioned HIPs must contain a PIQ.

The PIQ was designed to be easy for sellers to complete without professional help and will provide buyers with basic, useful information about a property that will help to inform their decision to view a property or make an offer. The questionnaire is of a similar nature to the previous Home Use Form (HUF). Prior to the April 2009, the HUF was an authorized document that was rarely included in a seller’s HIP due to the form being non-mandatory.

With the suspension of HIPs from 21 May 2010, Property Information Questionnaires are now redundant and not required when selling a house in the United Kingdom, except for Scotland, where they are an important part of the selling process. A house in Scotland, except for a few circumstances, i.e. new builds is not allowed to be marketed, with an agent or privately, without a home report being available within 9 days of going on sale. The single survey, which forms a part of the Home Report, is conducted by a chartered surveyor, who also gives a valuation for the property, independent of estate agents. This means, that to a great degree, valuations of housing in Scotland are more accurate than in the rest of the UK, where houses may be marketed at inflated prices set by estate agents or sellers. It is normal practice is Scotland for this to be the only survey conducted on a home, apart from a few circumstances. The seller information questionnaire and the energy report form the other two parts of the Scottish home report.

== History ==
The rule changes which came into effect on 6 April 2009 require every home to have a completed HIP in place before it can be put on the market. Before the new law, a HIP was required only to have been ordered before a home could be placed on the market.

Under the provisions of the Housing Act 2004 a Home Information Pack, previously known as a Seller’s Pack, must be provided before a property in England and Wales can be put on the open market for sale with vacant possession. The pack comprises a set of documents about the property: an Energy Performance Certificate, local authority searches, title documents, guarantees, etc. While the introduction of HIPs has been subject to delays and reduced requirements, they became mandatory for homes with four or more bedrooms on 1 August 2007 and were extended to three-bedroom properties from 10 September that year.

== Contents ==
Sellers are required to complete the PIQ and to be "truthful and accurate". A PIQ is typically about eight pages long, unless the home being sold is a leasehold property, in which case there are further questions to be completed. There are two types of questionnaire: one for newly built properties and another for other types of property. The information required on the PIQ only relates to the time during which the seller owned the property. However, if any of the information changes before the sale is completed, the seller is obliged to update the PIQ. The PIQ is available in a paper format from some Home Information Pack providers. It can be downloaded from the Communities and Local Government web site or it can be used in an online interactive format.

== Controversy ==
The introduction of the PIQ has sparked heated debate. Estate Agents in particular claim that the PIQ adds further delay to an already convoluted process. HIP providers counter-claim that there need not be any delay as long as the vendor fills out the questionnaire in a timely fashion. The Association of Home Information Pack Providers (AHIPP) claims its members are currently turning HIPs around in an average of five days. But the association warns that this is only possible if sellers complete the PIQ rapidly and allow energy assessors into their homes as quickly as possible.

While recent government research indicating that both sellers and buyers have largely been ignoring the HIP, representatives of the AHIPP argue that the questionnaire will significantly increase the number of consumers viewing the pack. The Conservative Party and lawyers alike argue that political dogma is behind the decision to continue with HIPs, despite their potential to further damage the property market. Lawyers in particular point out that the PIQ represent an erosion of the legal doctrine of caveat emptor, indicating that the PIQ is a legally binding document which, for first time, gives a buyer the ability to withdraw from a transaction and sue the seller for providing inaccurate information within the PIQ regardless of whether or not the information was provided negligently.
