= PiQ (magazine) =

American pop culture magazine from 2008

- PiQ, April 2008 (premiere issue)
- Executive Editor: Kevin Gifford
- Categories: Anime, comics, gadgets, lifestyle, manga, video games
- Frequency: Monthly
- First issue: April 2008
- Final issue Number: July 2008; 4
- Company: PiQ, LLC
- Country: United States
- Language: English
- ISSN: 1941-0522

PiQ /ˈpiːk/ was an American popular culture magazine that was published by PiQ, LLC, a subsidiary of A.D. Vision, from March through July 2008. Launched as a replacement for the magazine Newtype USA, which was discontinued in February 2008, PiQ went beyond anime and manga to include coverage on video games, popular American comics, and television series.

PiQ started with the Newtype USA staff and its 15,000 subscribers, who received two PiQ issues for every one of Newtype USA remaining on their accounts. The first issue was received with mixed reviews by readers and critics. After only four issues, the magazine was abruptly discontinued in July 2008, which the editorial staff blamed on low revenue, bad management, and lack of marketing.

== History ==
The magazine premiered in March 2008, as a replacement for the A.D. Vision magazine Newtype USA, which ceased publication in February 2008.

In addition to covering anime and manga, the magazine had expanded coverage of other subjects beyond those covered by Newtype USA, including American comics, high tech gadgetry, U.S. television series and films, and video games.

At its formation, PiQ retained many of the editorial staff and freelance writers that worked on Newtype USA, as well as the magazines 15,000 subscribers. In June 2008, after only four issues had been released, PiQ freelancers received word from Kevin Gifford, the editor of PiQ, that the magazine was being canceled and the PiQ offices had been closed down. The July 2008 issue, which had already been released when the announcement was made, was the magazine's last issue.

As part of the announcement, PiQ promised to compensate freelance writers for the work already done for the unpublished August issue. The editorial staff confirmed the news on the PiQ website, while also venting their own frustrations over the closure.

It's unfortunate that we'll never get a chance to see how successful PiQ could have been, but a combination of low advertising revenue, poor business management and a lack of proper marketing and promotion all hamstrung the magazine from the start. We, the editorial/creative/production staff, did the best we could to put together a quality publication, but as we've discovered, without a good financial backing, it's all an exercise in futility

— PiQ Editorial Staff, PiQ website

The magazine's website was also later shut down.

== Circulation and reception ==
Targeted at males 18–25 years of age, the first issue of PiQ had a planned circulation of 100,000. The publishers hoped to reach a circulation of 150,000 by the fourth quarter of the year.

Readers of the magazine had mixed reactions to it. Some enjoyed the greater coverage, while others strongly disliked it, to the point one group of fans organized monthly gatherings to burn their copies in effigy. Reviewers criticized the editorial tone of the magazine and its use of derogatory terms to refer to its readers. In the first issue, readers are called "nerds, dorks, geeks, freaks, maniacs, and pervos." Mania.com's Nadia Oxford felt the terms negatively impacted the magazine's otherwise high energy writing.

Christopher Butcher, of Comics212, referred to it as "weak all-around", feeling the editorial staff had a poor understanding of its demographic and had produced a substandard work. In looking at the first issue, he criticized its lack of focus, poor editorial mandate, and persistent mistakes in the prose that affected readability. Butcher did feel that with work, the magazine had the potential to be successful, praising its design and several articles as being a sign of what the magazine could be.

== See also ==
- List of manga magazines published outside of Japan
