= Delfinium Prints =

German independent publisher

Delfinium Prints is a German independent publisher specialised on comics. It was founded by David Füleki and Roy Seyfert in 2008.

== Publications (selection) ==
=== Comics ===
- 78 Tage auf der Straße des Hasses
- Grablicht
- Chicken King
- Rasselbande Adventures
- Suburbia Highschool
- Super Epic Brawl Omega
- Patina
- Go in and win

=== Other products ===
- T-shirts
- Posters
- Postcards
- Buttons
- Trading cards
