= List of Hunter × Hunter chapters =

First volume cover, released by Shueisha on June 4, 1998

Hunter × Hunter is a Japanese manga series written and illustrated by Yoshihiro Togashi. It initially focuses on a boy named Gon Freecss and his quest to become a Hunter in order to find his father, Ging, who is himself a famous Hunter.

Hunter × Hunter has been serialized in Weekly Shōnen Jump magazine since March 16, 1998, The first tankōbon volume was released by Shueisha on June 4, 1998, and 39 volumes have been published as of July 3, 2026. Kurapika's Memories (クラピカ追憶編, Kurapika Tsuioku-hen), a two-part manga Togashi wrote to act as a prequel to the first animated film Phantom Rouge, was published in Weekly Shōnen Jump in December 2012. The two chapters were collected into a single tankōbon, numbered Volume 0 of the series, that was given to the first one million theatergoers of the film. The series has also been published in a sōshūhen edition that aims to recreate the manga as it was originally serialized in Weekly Shōnen Jump in the same size and with the color pages. 11 volumes were released between December 9, 2011, and April 18, 2014, covering up to the Election story arc.

In North America, Hunter × Hunter is licensed for English publication by Viz Media as part of their Shonen Jump Advanced line of graphics novels, aimed at older teenagers. They published the first volume on April 5, 2005, and all 37 volumes have been released as of October 3, 2023. Viz included the Kurapika's Memories chapters in the December 17 and 24, 2012, issues of their digital Weekly Shonen Jump Alpha.

== Volumes ==
No.	Title	Original release date	English release date
1	The Day of Departure; Shuppatsu no Hi (出発の日)	June 4, 1998; 978-4-08-872571-0	April 5, 2005; 978-1-59116-753-2
001. "The Day of Departure" (出発の日, Shuppatsu no Hi); 002. "An Encounter in the Storm" (嵐の出会い, Arashi no Deai); 003. "The Ultimate Choice" (究極の選択, Kyūkyoku no Sentaku); 004. "Kiriko: Wicked Magical Vulpes" (魔獣 凶狸狐, Majū Kiriko); 005. "The First Phase Begins, Part 1" (第1次試験開始①, Dai Ichi-ji Shiken Kaishi (Ichi)); 006. "The First Phase Begins, Part 2" (第1次試験開始②, Dai Ichi-ji Shiken Kaishi (Ni)); 007. "Respective Reasons" (それぞれの理由, Sorezore no Riyū); 008. "The Other Enemy" (もうひとつの敵, Mō Hitotsu no Teki)
Against the objections of his guardian Mito, young Gon Freecss registers for the Hunter Examination in order to follow in the footsteps of his father Ging, a legendary Hunter who left Gon with his family years ago. On a boat ride to the mainland, Gon meets Kurapika and Leorio Paradinight, who are also out to become Hunters. Despite some initial hostilities, the three bond after working together to save a fellow passenger, passing the Hunter Qualification Exam in the process. After passing two more tests together, properly responding to a question about a hypothetical moral delimma and seeing through a trap set by shapeshifting magical beasts called Kiriko, the trio are guided to the hidden exam hall where the actual Hunter Exam will take place. Among the 404 other applicants, Gon instantly befriends Killua Zoldyck as they are the same age. The first phase of the exam begins: follow examiner Satotz in a marathon run of unknown length through a tunnel. After climbing a huge flight of stairs, the 311 remaining examinees enter a deadly swamp filled with devious magical beasts. But it becomes even more dangerous when another examinee, the sadistic magician Hisoka decides to "help" in the examination process.
2	A Struggle in the Mist; Kiri no Naka no Kōbō (霧の中の攻防)	September 2, 1998; 978-4-08-872606-9	May 3, 2005; 978-1-59116-785-3
009. "A Struggle in the Mist" (霧の中の攻防, Kiri no Naka no Kōbō); 010. "An Unexpected Task" (意外な課題, Igai na Kadai); 011. "The Inevitable Outcome" (当然の結果, Tōzen no Kekka); 012. "The Chairman Awaits" (会長参上, Kaichō Sanjō); 013. "A Game at Midnight, Part 1" (真夜中のゲーム①, Mayonaka no Gēmu (Ichi)); 014. "A Game at Midnight, Part 2" (真夜中のゲーム②, Mayonaka no Gēmu (Ni)); 015. "The Path of Majority Rules" (多数決の道, Tasūketsu no Michi); 016. "Enter the Taskmasters" (試練官登場, Shirenkan Tōjō); 017. "Disparate Choice" (不自由な2択, Fujiyū na Nitaku)
The bored Hisoka decides to "help out" in the selection process by using a playing card to kill examinees he deems unworthy, sparing Gon and his friends, who then reach the site of the second phase of the exam. The surviving 148 participants are then put through a cooking contest held by Gourmet Hunters Menchi and Buhara at a forest reserve. While Buhara is easy to satisfy, Menchi is more demanding and fails the remaining 70 examinees. However, Hunter Association chairman Isaac Netero intervenes and a replacement test is held where the examinees must dive into a ravine to retrieve and boil the egg of a spider eagle. Gon and his friends all pass easily and are among the forty remaining participants transported via Netero's zeppelin to the next exam site. They have 72 hours to reach the bottom of Trick Tower, a prison managed by the Bounty Hunter Lippo. Gon, Leorio, Kurapika, and Killua stumble upon "The Path of Majority Rules" method of descent and must work together with "Rookie Crusher" Tonpa, who joins the Hunter Exam every year solely to sabotage others' efforts. The quintet must win the best of five matches in any competition of their choice against convicts, whose sentences are reduced based on how long they can stall, to proceed. Tonpa immediately forfeits his fight to the death against Bendot, a robber and murderer. Gon wins his match against serial bomber Sedokan, where the winner is whoever's candle lasts longer, by using his speed to blow out his candle.
3	Resolution; Ketchaku (決着)	November 4, 1998; 978-4-08-872630-4	July 5, 2005; 978-1-59116-849-2
018. "The Two Aces in the Hole" (2つの切り札, Futatsu no Kirifuda); 019. "The Trap of Majority Rules" (多数決の罠, Tasūketsu no Wana); 020. "Gambling Time" (ギャンブルタイム, Gyanburu Taimu); 021. "Resolution" (決着, Ketchaku); 022. "The Last Question" (最後の問題, Saigo no Mondai); 023. "Two Enemies" (2人の敵, Futari no Teki); 024. "Crash Course" (特訓, Tokkun); 025. "The Second Day" (2日目, Futsukame); 026. "The Night Before the Showdown" (決戦前夜, Kessen Zen'ya)
Kurapika knocks his opponent Majtani, a repeat fraudster and blackmailer who pretends to be a strong serial killer, unconscious. But because it was agreed that the match could only be won by forfeit or death, and Kurapika refuses to kill the man, it continues. Leroute, a female wildlife trafficker, proposes bets to Leorio waging 50 of the quintet's remaining 59 hours to descend the tower, starting with whether or not Majtani is unconscious or dead, and then whether or not he is actually unconscious or pretending. Majtani forfeits his match against Kurapika, however, Leorio only has 20 hours left to bet with. After knowingly wasting 10 hours on a perverted bet, Leorio loses the remaining 10 on a rock–paper–scissors match. Killua then surprises everyone in his match by ripping out the heart of infamous mass murderer Johness. Although Gon's group won the best of five and can continue, they have less than 10 hours to finish their descent. They run through dozens of other traps, and pass the exam with less than a minute to spare. The twenty-four remaining examinees are ferried by boat to the fourth phase of the exam, Zevil Island, where they will spend one week and can only pass with six points; three points for retaining your own badge, three for obtaining the badge of your allotted target, and one point for any other badge. Leorio and Kurapika team up, the latter earning his randomly drawn target's badge with ease.
4	End Game; Saishū Shiken Kaishi! (lit. The Final Test Begins!) (最終試験開始!)	February 4, 1999; 978-4-08-872672-4	September 6, 2005; 978-1-59116-992-5
027. "A Volatile Situation" (一触即発, Isshoku Sokuhatsu); 028. "A Huge Favor" (大きな借り, Ōki na Kari); 029. "Killua's Case" (キルアの場合, Kirua no Baai); 030. "The Slithering Trap" (蠢く罠, Ugomeku Wana); 031. "By the Skin of Their Teeth..." (九死に…, Kyūshi ni...); 032. "And the Final Test...?" (最終試験は…?, Saishū Shiken wa...?); 033. "The Final Test Begins!" (最終試験開始!, Saishū Shiken Kaishi!); 034. "The First Candidate Accepted!?" (合格第1号!?, Gōkaku Dai Ichi Gō!?); 035. "Light and Darkness, Part 1" (光と闇①, Hikari to Yami (Ichi))
Gon is able to obtain his target Hisoka's badge when the magician is distracted, but is paralyzed by the person who drew his own number and loses it and his own badge. However, Hisoka, admitting the boy's skills, gives him back the badges after killing his attacker, which Gon takes as an insult. Killua easily collects his target's badge as well. Gon teams up with Kurapika and Leorio to help the latter obtain his target Ponzu's badge, but they become trapped in a cave with her due to a poisonous snake trap set by her target. However, thanks to Gon's self-sacrifice and inhuman lung capacity, all four escape, with Leorio earning his six points. The fifth and final phase of the exam sees the remaining nine applicants compete is an elimination tournament with a twist; the winner of each match passes the Hunter Exam, while the loser continues on, giving them more chances. Meaning only one person will fail the exam and all other examinees are given Hunter licenses. The matches can only be won by forcing your opponent to admit defeat, beating them unconscious will not win a match, and any examinee that kills their opponent is disqualified. The first match features Gon versus the ninja Hanzo. Despite being the far stronger opponent, Hanzo sees Gon is too determined to admit defeat no matter what he does and forfeits. When Gon wakes up from being knocked out after his match, he learns that he is now an official Hunter and that the Hunter Exam is over, with Killua being the one to fail.
5	Family Matters; Jin Furīkusu (lit. Ging Freecss) (ジン=フリークス)	April 30, 1999; 978-4-08-872713-4	November 8, 2005; 978-1-4215-0184-0
036. "Light and Darkness, Part 2" (光と闇②, Hikari to Yami (Ni)); 037. "Light and Darkness, Part 3" (光と闇③, Hikari to Yami (San)); 038. "Ging Freecss" (ジン=フリークス, Jin Furīkusu); 039. "Intruder" (侵入者, Shin'nyūsha); 040. "The Zoldycks, Part 1" (ゾルディック家①, Zorudikku Ke (Ichi)); 041. "The Zoldycks, Part 2" (ゾルディック家②, Zorudikku Ke (Ni)); 042. "The Zoldycks, Part 3" (ゾルディック家③, Zorudikku Ke (San)); 043. "The Zoldycks, Part 4" (ゾルディック家④, Zorudikku Ke (Yon)); 044. "The Heavens Arena" (天空闘技場, Tenkū Tōgijō)
Gon learns that Killua's opponent Gittarakur, was actually Killua's older brother Illumi in disguise. Illumi seems to have psychologically manipulated him to forfeit their match, before Killua killed another examinee and returned to the Zoldyck family estate. Gon, Kurapika, and Leorio all resolve to find Killua, only to find visiting the Zoldyck estate is not a simple task as they spend 20 days strength training just to open the estate gates and then contend with the butlers who are as skilled as licensed Hunters. In the end, Killua ultimately convinces his father Silva to allow him to choose his own path and rejoins his friends. Gon refuses to use his Hunter license until he punches Hisoka and makes him take back the badge he let Gon have during the exam. Hisoka promised to meet Kurapika on September 1st in Yorknew City to give him information on the Phantom Troupe, the gang of thieves who massacred his clan for their prized scarlet eyes. Thus, all four agree to meet there in about six months, during the biggest auction in the world. Leorio departs to study for medical school and Kurapika intends to use his Hunter status to earn money to attend the auction. In order to make money and train to fight Hisoka, Gon and Killua enter Heavens Arena, a skyscraper where thousands of people fight in front of spectators.
6	Nen Sense; Hisoka no Jōken (lit. Hisoka's Terms) (ヒソカの条件)	October 4, 1999; 978-4-08-872749-3	January 3, 2006; 978-1-4215-0185-7
045. "Ren" (レン); 046. "Nen" (ネン); 047. "The Invisible Wall" (見えない壁, Mienai Kabe); 048. "Hisoka's Terms" (ヒソカの条件, Hisoka no Jōken); 049. "The Battle Begins!!" (戦闘開始!!, Sentō Kaishi!!); 050. "Zetsu" (ゼツ); 051. "Ten" (点); 052. "Kastro" (カストロ, Kasutoro); 053. "Double" (ダブル, Daburu); 054. "Cause of Defeat" (敗因, Haiin)
Gon and Killua meet another strong young boy, Zushi, who is able to use a strange energy similar to Killua's brother Illumi. Though when they ask Zushi's master Wing to teach them the secret to this energy Nen, he misleads them with a simple explanation as they are not his students and the ability must not be misused. However, upon reaching the 200th floor of Heavens Arena, Gon and Killua discover Hisoka waiting for them and he prevents them from progressing into the floor with his Nen. For the boys' safety, Wing agrees to teach them the secret of Nen, but with only 4 hours for them to register on the 200th floor, they must take the quick and dangerous way of unlocking the ability. After just over an hour of learning the basics of Nen, Gon and Killua use their Nen to protect themselves from Hisoka's and register with the 200th floor. Hisoka agrees to face Gon in the ring on the condition that he can win at least one fight on the floor. Gon fights Gido, a person with a single peg leg who controls spinning tops with his Nen, the next day and loses with multiple broken bones. Wing bans them from fighting for two months while he trains them in Nen. In the meantime, Hisoka shows off his Nen abilities when he faces Kastro in a rematch. Despite Kastro appearing to have the advantage, severing both of Hisoka's arms, Hisoka tricks him before killing him.
7	Nen Combatant; Kore Kara (lit. Next) (これから)	December 22, 1999; 978-4-08-872788-2	March 7, 2006; 978-1-4215-0332-5
055. "As For Hisoka..." (ヒソカは…, Hisoka wa...); 056. "Training Resumes" (修行再開, Shugyō Saikai); 057. "Promise" (約束, Yakusoku); 058. "Rematch" (再戦, Saisen); 059. "Making the Grade" (及第, Kyūdai); 060. "Passing the Exam" (合格, Gōkaku); 061. "Showdown" (決戦, Kessen); 062. "Like You Mean It" (本気, Honki); 063. "Next" (これから, Kore Kara)
Hisoka has both his arms reattached by Machi, who informs him he must meet up with "everyone" in Yorknew City on August 30, before it is shown that he has a fake 12-legged spider tattoo, the signature of the Phantom Troupe. With two months having passed, Gon and Killua quickly learn another basic of Nen in order to fight a trio that abducted Zushi and blackmailed them into registering matches. Angered, Killua intimidates Sadaso into forfeiting his matches against both him and Gon. Gon defeats Gido in a rematch, while Killua beats Riehlvelt, a man in a Nen-powered wheelchair who fights with electrified whips. After Gon also beats Riehlvelt, he and Killua learn their specific Nen types, Enhancer and Transmuter respectively, and master all the basics of Nen. Wing reveals that Gon has now become a full-fledged Hunter, learning Nen having been the secret final step. Gon then has his chance to fight Hisoka and manages to give him back his exam badge before being utterly defeated. Satisfied with Gon's progress, Hisoka declares the next time they fight will be to the death. Having accomplished what he set out to do after the Hunter exam, Gon and Killua travel to Gon's home, Whale Island.
8	The Island; Ōkushon Kaisai!! (lit. The Auction Begins!!) (オークション開催!!)	April 4, 2000; 978-4-08-872847-6	May 2, 2006; 978-1-4215-0643-2
064. "Homecoming" (帰郷, Kikyō); 065. "About Ging" (ジンについて, Jin ni Tsuite); 066. "The Tape" (テープ, Tēpu); 067. "The Flesh Collector's Mansion: Part 1" (人体収集家の館①, Jintai Shūshūka no Yakata (Ichi)); 068. "The Flesh Collector's Mansion: Part 2" (人体収集家の館②, Jintai Shūshūka no Yakata (Ni)); 069. "Greed Island" (グリードアイランド, Gurīdo Airando); 070. "To Yorknew!" (ヨークシンへ, Yōkushin e); 071. "The Auction Begins!!" (オークション開催!!, Ōkushon Kaisai!!); 072. "September 1st: Part 1" (9月1日①, Kugatsu Tsuitachi (Ichi)); 073. "September 1st: Part 2" (9月1日②, Kugatsu Tsuitachi (Ni))
Gon returns to Whale Island with Killua, who agrees to search for Gon's father with him until he figures out what he wants to do. Mito gives Gon an odd box that Ging told her to give him when he became a Hunter, and tells Gon everything she knows about his father. After using Nen to open the box, Gon and Killua discover a cassette tape with a recording of Ging challenging Gon to find him. Also contained in the box are the only clues to Ging's whereabouts: a memory card for the Joystation video game console and a strange ring. Meanwhile, having learned Nen, Kurapika goes to a job interview to become a bodyguard for a flesh collector with strong ties to the Yorknew auction. To pass the interview the applicants must survive an attack by 11 armed men, which Kurapika quickly stops after determining they are masses of aura controlled via Nen by one of the other applicants. Gon and Killua learn that the memory card contains only a save file for Greed Island, a video game only for Hunters that requires Nen to play and of which only 100 copies were ever produced. They also learn that several copies of the game will be sold at the annual auction in Yorknew City for extremely high prices due to their rarity. At Yorknew, Gon and Killua reunite with Leorio and continue to earn money. Kurapika, Basho, Melody and Baise are all hired by Dalzollene to protect Neon Nostrade, the fortune-telling daughter of the head of the Nostrade mafia family and collector of body parts. On the first night, members of the Phantom Troupe attack the underground auction run by the mafia to steal everything and kill everyone there, including Baise and two other Nostrade bodyguards.
9	Shadow Beasts; Kugatsu Tsuitachi (lit. September 1st) (9月1日)	July 4, 2000; 978-4-08-872890-2	July 5, 2006; 978-1-4215-0644-9
074. "September 1st: Part 3" (9月1日③, Kugatsu Tsuitachi (San)); 075. "September 1st: Part 4" (9月1日④, Kugatsu Tsuitachi (Yon)); 076. "September 1st: Part 5" (9月1日⑤, Kugatsu Tsuitachi (Go)); 077. "September 1st: Part 6" (9月1日⑥, Kugatsu Tsuitachi (Roku)); 078. "September 1st: Part 7" (9月1日⑦, Kugatsu Tsuitachi (Nana)); 079. "September 2nd: Part 1" (9月2日①, Kugatsu Futsuka (Ichi)); 080. "September 2nd: Part 2" (9月2日②, Kugatsu Futsuka (Ni)); 081. "September 2nd: Part 3" (9月2日③, Kugatsu Futsuka (San)); 082. "September 2nd: Part 4" (9月2日④, Kugatsu Futsuka (Yon)); 083. "September 2nd: Part 5" (9月2日⑤, Kugatsu Futsuka (Go))
Finding all of the items already moved, the seven Phantom Troupe members leave emptyhanded in a hot air balloon, followed by hundreds of Mafia members to a canyon outside the city where they are slaughtered by Uvogin barehanded. Uvogin also kills four of the Shadow Beasts, elite Nen-users under the direct command of the Mafia's 10 dons. Kurapika then subdues Uvogin by using his Nen ability Chain Jail, which was specifically designed to restrain Troupe members, and quickly leaves with his quarry while the other Troupe members are stopped by the arrival of the rest of the Shadow Beasts. Uvogin is brought back to a Nostrade base where he is questioned, while Kurapika temporarily leaves to meet and obtain information about the Phantom Troupe from Hisoka. During this time, having killed the remaining Shadow Beasts including the one who took the auction items, the Troupe members disguise themselves to free Uvogin while killing Dalzollene. Uvogin then swears revenge on the "chain dude" that captured him. While making money in an arm-wrestling contest, Gon, Killua, and Leorio learn of the Mafia's large monetary award for the capture of any member of the Phantom Troupe. The three eagerly start gathering information on the whereabouts of the thieves. Uvogin tracks down Kurapika and the two agree to a showdown in the city's outskirts, where Kurapika surprises him by taking his powerful strikes despite being a Conjurer. He is able to do this because he is able to control 100% of all Nen types when his eyes turn scarlet. Kurapika succeeds in trapping the Troupe member again with Chain Jail.
10	Fakes, Swindles, and the Old Switcheroo; Kugatsu Mikka (lit. September 3rd) (9月3日)	November 2, 2000; 978-4-08-873021-9	September 5, 2006; 978-1-4215-0645-6
084. "September 2nd: Part 6" (9月2日⑥, Kugatsu Futsuka (Roku)); 085. "September 3rd: Part 1" (9月3日①, Kugatsu Mikka (Ichi)); 086. "September 3rd: Part 2" (9月3日②, Kugatsu Mikka (Ni)); 087. "September 3rd: Part 3" (9月3日③, Kugatsu Mikka (San)); 088. "September 3rd: Part 4" (9月3日④, Kugatsu Mikka (Yon)); 089. "September 3rd: Part 5" (9月3日⑤, Kugatsu Mikka (Go)); 090. "September 3rd: Part 6" (9月3日⑥, Kugatsu Mikka (Roku)); 091. "September 3rd: Part 7" (9月3日⑦, Kugatsu Mikka (Nana)); 092. "September 3rd: Part 8" (9月3日⑧, Kugatsu Mikka (Hachi)); 093. "September 3rd: Part 9" (9月3日⑨, Kugatsu Mikka (Kyū))
Although Kurapika tries to interrogate Uvogin with his Judgement Chain technique, the Phantom Troupe member purposely violates its rules and is killed. After reaching a dead-end for clues on the Troupe, Gon, Killua, and Leorio take out an interest free loan on Gon's Hunter license to pay a reward for information. While Leorio sifts through offered information, Gon and Killua discover they can use a Nen technique to find valuable items at street auctions, and start to use this method to make money. They meet an antiques expert named Zepile who prevents them from getting swindled when they try to sell the items they found, and winds up making him their auction agent, for a cut of the final proceeds. By this time, the Troupe realize Uvogin is dead with Machi and Nobunaga Hazama sent out to find any traces of Kurapika, which results in Gon and Killua following them based on a tip from an informant. But the boys are captured and brought back to the Troupe's base where they are interrogated about the "Chain User". Not knowing Kurapika's abilities or actions, they pass Pakunoda's questioning with her Nen ability, which allows her to read people's memories by touching them. Nobunaga decides to watch the two until Chrollo Lucilfer returns to have him interview them to become new members, while the others head out to search for the Nostrade bodyguards.
11	Next Stop: Meteor City--The Junkyard of the World; Kugatsu Yokka (lit. September 4th) (9月4日)	March 2, 2001; 978-4-08-873087-5	November 7, 2006; 978-1-4215-0646-3
094. "September 3rd: Part 10" (9月3日⑩, Kugatsu Mikka (Jū)); 095. "September 3rd: Part 11" (9月3日⑪, Kugatsu Mikka (Jū Ichi)); 096. "September 3rd: Part 12" (9月3日⑫, Kugatsu Mikka (Jū Ni)); 097. "September 3rd: Part 13" (9月3日⑬, Kugatsu Mikka (Jū San)); 098. "September 3rd: Part 14" (9月3日⑭, Kugatsu Mikka (Jū Yon)); 099. "September 3rd: Part 15" (9月3日⑮, Kugatsu Mikka (Jū Go)); 100. "September 3rd: Part 16" (9月3日⑯, Kugatsu Mikka (Jū Roku)); 101. "September 3rd: Part 17" (9月3日⑰, Kugatsu Mikka (Jū Nana)); 102. "September 4th: Part 1" (9月4日①, Kugatsu Yokka (Ichi)); 103. "September 4th: Part 2" (9月4日②, Kugatsu Yokka (Ni))
By splitting up, Gon and Killua manage to escape Nobunaga, and having now realized from the Phantom Troupe's questions that the "Chain User" is Kurapika, Killua suggests asking him how he became strong enough to kill a member so quickly. Meanwhile, the Mafia has hired several professional assassins to protect the underground auction in case the Troupe shows up, among which are Silva and Zeno Zoldyck. At the same time, Neon purposely loses her bodyguards to attend the auction and gets helps from a disguised Chrollo, who gets close to her to acquire her Nen ability to foretell the future. After knocking her out and sending her away in an ambulance, Chrollo summons the Troupe to hold a "requiem" for Uvogin by slaughtering everyone at the auction site. Zeno and Silva fight Chrollo together until getting word that other Zoldycks have successfully killed the Mafia's 10 dons, as hired by Chrollo. With their clients dead, Zeno and Silva simply leave. Having faked some of their deaths, the Phantom Troupe members covertly swindle the mafia with forgeries of the auction items created by Kortopi's Nen. Believing most of the Troupe to be dead, Kurapika reunites with Gon, Killua and Leorio and tells them his abilities.
12	September 4th: Part 2 Kugatsu Yokka Sono Ni (9月4日 その2)	July 4, 2001; 978-4-08-873135-3	January 2, 2007; 978-1-4215-0647-0
104. "September 4th: Part 3" (9月4日③, Kugatsu Yokka (San)); 105. "September 4th: Part 4" (9月4日④, Kugatsu Yokka (Yon)); 106. "September 4th: Part 5" (9月4日⑤, Kugatsu Yokka (Go)); 107. "September 4th: Part 6" (9月4日⑥, Kugatsu Yokka (Roku)); 108. "September 4th: Part 7" (9月4日⑦, Kugatsu Yokka (Nana)); 109. "September 4th: Part 8" (9月4日⑧, Kugatsu Yokka (Hachi)); 110. "September 4th: Part 9" (9月4日⑨, Kugatsu Yokka (Kyū)); 111. "September 4th: Part 10" (9月4日⑩, Kugatsu Yokka (Jū)); 112. "September 4th: Part 11" (9月4日⑪, Kugatsu Yokka (Jū Ichi)); 113. "September 4th: Part 12" (9月4日⑫, Kugatsu Yokka (Jū Ni)); 114. "September 4th: Part 13" (9月4日⑬, Kugatsu Yokka (Jū San)); 115. "September 4th: Part 14" (9月4日⑭, Kugatsu Yokka (Jū Yon))
Using Neon's fortune-telling ability, Chrollo creates fortunes for most of the Phantom Troupe which reveal that half of them will die the following week. Hisoka thinks quickly in altering his fortune to convince them to remain in Yorknew, so he can fight Chrollo, and also lets Kurapika know that the corpses were fake. Meanwhile, the Mafia withdraws the reward on the Phantom Troupe, but Gon, Killua and Leorio still want to help Kurapika track them down. He formulates a plan and enlists the help of Melody, whose hearing allows her to tell people apart by heartbeat from far away. The group tail the Troupe, but Gon and Killua are captured once again. Kurapika quickly alters the plan which he communicates to Gon and Killua via Leorio pretending to yell through his phone. A blackout is orchestrated at the hotel the Troupe take the boys to, and Gon and Killua provide a distraction so Kurapika can capture Chrollo just as Pakunoda reads their minds again, learning everything about Kurapika. However, a ransom note is left for the Phantom Troupe, demanding Pakunoda not reveal the memories she extracted from the boys or Chrollo will be killed. Kurapika contacts Pakunoda telling her to travel to a location alone, while every other Troupe member must go back to their hideout. Realizing this is his chance to fight Chrollo, Hisoka calls Illumi for help.
13	September 10th Kugatsu Tōka (9月10日)	November 2, 2001; 978-4-08-873180-3	March 6, 2007; 978-1-4215-1069-9
116. "September 4th: Part 15" (9月4日⑮, Kugatsu Yokka (Jū Go)); 117. "September 4th: Part 16" (9月4日⑯, Kugatsu Yokka (Jū Roku)); 118. "September 4th: Part 17" (9月4日⑰, Kugatsu Yokka (Jū Nana)); 119. "September 4th: Part 18" (9月4日⑱, Kugatsu Yokka (Jū Hachi)); 120. "September 6th: Part 1" (9月6日①, Kugatsu Muika (Ichi)); 121. "September 6th: Part 2" (9月6日②, Kugatsu Muika (Ni)); 122. "September 6th: Part 3" (9月6日③, Kugatsu Muika (San)); 123. "September 6th: Part 4" (9月6日④, Kugatsu Muika (Yon)); 124. "September 7th: Part 1 to September 10th: Part 1" (9月7日①-9月10日①, Kugatsu Nanoka (Ichi) - Kugatsu Tōka (Ichi)); 125. "September 10th: Part 2" (9月10日②, Kugatsu Tōka (Ni)); 126. "September 10th: Part 3" (9月10日③, Kugatsu Tōka (San)); 127. "September 10th: Part 4" (9月10日④, Kugatsu Tōka (Yon))
At a meetup, Kurapika uses his Judgement Chain on both Chrollo and Pakunoda; Chrollo will die if he uses Nen or communicates with anyone from the Phantom Troupe, and Pakunoda will die if she does not free Gon and Killua by midnight or if she reveals anything about Kurapika. Despite some disagreeing, the Troupe allow Pakunoda to take the boys to make the hostage exchange. Hisoka, with Illumi impersonating him back at their base, follows so he can fight Chrollo, but takes his leave when he learns Chrollo can no longer use Nen. After the exchange, Pakunoda returns to the Troupe's base alone and sacrifices her life to restore trust among the group by using her Nen ability to transmit her memories and knowledge of Kurapika to her comrades. Later, Gon, Killua and Zepile attend an auction to win a copy of Greed Island, where they run into two Phantom Troupe members, who reveal the group will not retaliate against Kurapika for fear of his Nen on Chrollo becoming even more powerful after his death. But the two conceal their assumption that Chrollo must be seeking out an exorcist to dispel Kurapika's Nen. Gon and Killua approach the man who won the copy of Greed Island, the billionaire Battera who hires Hunters to beat the game, offering to beat it for him. But Tsezguerra, Battera's most trusted Hunter who has played the game, tells them they are currently too weak and will only die. Though frustrated, Gon and Killua do not give up and spend the next four days developing their unique Nen abilities for Battera's official interviews, with Kurapika and Melody secretly leaving Yorknew without them knowing. Having overheard the boys at the auction, Phinks and Feitan of the Phantom Troupe acquire a copy of Greed Island and enter the game, inviting two others. Killua, transmutating his aura into electricity, and Gon, enhancing his physical attacks, surprise Tsezguerra with the speed of their progress and are hired by Battera. After saying goodbye to Leorio, Gon enters Greed Island, learning that the goal is to collect 100 specific cards.
14	The Secret of Greed Island; Gēmu no Himitsu (島の秘密)	April 4, 2002; 978-4-08-873262-6	May 1, 2007; 978-1-4215-1070-5
128. "September 10th: Part 5" (9月10日⑤, Kugatsu Tōka (Go)); 129. "Antokiba, Town of Prizes" (懸賞都市 アントキバ, Kenshō Toshi Antokiba); 130. "The Reason for the Recruitment" (勧誘の理由, Kan'yū no Wake); 131. "The Answer" (回答, Kaitō); 132. "The Forty Spells" (40種の呪文, Yon Jū Shu no Superu); 133. "How to Defend Yourself Without Spells" (呪文以外の防御法, Superu Igai no Gādo Hō); 134. "The Island's Secret" (島の秘密, Gēmu no Himitsu); 135. "To Masadora! Part 1" (いざマサドラへ!①, Iza Masadora e! (Ichi)); 136. "To Masadora! Part 2" (いざマサドラへ!②, Iza Masadora e! (Ni)); 137. "To Masadora! Part 3" (いざマサドラへ!③, Iza Masadora e! (San)); 138. "To Masadora...?" (いざマサドラへ…?, Iza Masadora e...?); 139. "Are They Really Going to Masadora?" (ホントにマサドラ行くのか?, Honto ni Masadora Iku no ka?)
In order to gather information on how to play Greed Island, Gon and Killua visit a nearby town. They are shocked by the death of another player that entered the game along with them, which was caused by a Nen ability. In order to claim the 50 billion jenny prize offered by Batterra for being the first to clear the game, some players have resorted to stealing cards and killing off the competition. The foremost among them is the anonymous "Bomber", a powerful Nen user who uses Nen bombs to kill his victims. Gon, Killua, and other new players are approached by an alliance of players also hired by Battera who propose a non-violent way of winning the game; monopolize the spell cards so only their group can use them and then collect the 100 specific cards needed to clear the game, splitting the monetary reward. Gon and Killua decline, wanting to enjoy playing the game for fun, while the ones who accept are taken to the alliance's hideout where they are given more detailed information. Meanwhile, Shalnark, Shizuku and Kortopi also enter Greed Island, deduce that the game is taking place in the real world and plan to take all the valuable items in the game back home, instead of just the three allowed for clearing it. Gon and Killua are approached by Biscuit Krueger, a fellow hired player and Wing's master, who sees potential in their combat abilities and offers to become their teacher. She has the boys fight with the cannibal Binolt, who is much more versed in combat than them, for about ten days.
15	Progress; Yakushin (躍進)	October 4, 2002; 978-4-08-873314-2	July 3, 2007; 978-1-4215-1071-2
140. "They Got to Masadora, But..." (マサドラには行ったけど, Masadora niwa Itta kedo); 141. "They Went to Masadora Already, So I'll Go With a Different Title Now" (もうマサドラ行ったから次から別の感じのタイトルでいいや, Mō Masadora Itta kara Tsugi kara Betsu no Kanji no Taitoru de Ii Ya); 142. "The Bomber" (「爆弾魔」, "Bomā"); 143. "Countdown" (「命の音」, "Kauntodaun"); 144. "Release" (「解放」, "Rirīsu"); 145. "Janken" (邪拳=ジャンケン!?, Jaken Ikōru Janken!?); 146. "Abengane: Part 1" (アベンガネ①, Abengane (Ichi)); 147. "Abengane: Part 2" (アベンガネ②, Abengane (Ni)); 148. "The Exam Begins" (試験開始, Shiken Kaishi); 149. "Encounter" (遭遇, Sōgū); 150. "Embarkment" (始動, Shidō); 151. "Progress" (躍進, Yakushin)
Biscuit begins teaching Gon and Killua advanced Nen applications by having the pair dig through rock pinnacles and fighting monsters. Meanwhile, Genthru reveals himself as the Bomber to his fellow alliance members and that he has covertly planted bombs onto all of their bodies, before threatening to kill them all unless the alliance gives him the 90 specified cards they have collected. However, after receiving all of the cards, Genthru and his two accomplices blow up every member of the alliance. At the same time, Killua temporarily leaves the game to quickly take the Hunter Exam while Abengane, who survives the bomb by exorcising it off his own body, warns Gon and Biscuit about Genthru. The Phantom Troupe learn that there is an exorcist in Greed Island, whom they seek for Chrollo, and find out that Hisoka is also in the game, hired by their leader to do the same. Having decided on and developed their own signature Nen abilities, Gon and Killua finally begin playing Greed Island with Biscuit after three months in the game.
16	Face-Off; Taiketsu (対決)	February 4, 2003; 978-4-08-873382-1	September 4, 2007; 978-1-4215-1072-9
152. "Contact" (接触, Sesshoku); 153. "Success" (成功, Seikō); 154. "Common Cause" (共同戦線, Kyōdō Sensen); 155. "The Captain and His 14 Devils" (船長と14人の悪魔, Senchō to Jū Yo Nin no Akuma); 156. "Face-Off: Part 1" (対決①, Taiketsu (Ichi)); 157. "Face-Off: Part 2" (対決②, Taiketsu (Ni)); 158. "Two of a Kind +1" (似た者同士^{2}+1, Nitamono Dōshi no Jijō Purasu Ichi); 159. "Aiai, the City of Love" (恋愛都市アイアイ, Ren'ai Toshi Aiai); 160. "Face-Off: Part 3" (対決③, Taiketsu (San)); 161. "Face-Off: Part 4" (対決④, Taiketsu (Yon)); 162. "Face-Off: Part 5" (対決⑤, Taiketsu (Go)); 163. "Face-Off: Part 6" (対決⑥, Taiketsu (Roku))
With 51 of the 100 specific cards needed to beat Greed Island, Gon, Killua and Biscuit begin contacting other players in order to trade information regarding the remaining cards. But Genthru's team are nearing completion of the game with 96. In order to prevent Genthru from winning, Gon and company team up with another alliance to gain a monopoly on the only card in the game that no one has acquired—"Strip of Beach". In the town of Soufrabi, they encounter fifteen pirates who have taken over the town and are led by Razor—a Greed Island game master, ex-convict and acquaintance of Ging. The event was triggered because the alliance is composed of 15 people, the same number as the pirates. The players must beat the pirates in competitive sports and win eight games to force them out of town, but the majority of the alliance members are useless and they lose. Gon's trio and Goreinu decide to try again with a group of stronger competitors. After finding Hisoka and recruiting him, they decide Tsezguerra's team of four are their best option. With nine strong competitors, they recruit six filler members who they do not expect to win and head back to Soufrabi to try again. After Gon's alliance accumulates four points, Razor proposes a game of eight-man dodgeball. The match begins between Razor and seven devils formed from his Nen, against Gon, Killua, Biscuit, Hisoka, Tsezguerra, Goreinu and the two Nen Beasts he formed. Goreinu knocks out two devils before switching places with his Nen Beast in fear of Razor's throw, which knocks the beast out. Razor and his devils hit Tsezguerra, but the ball is caught by Killua, however, Tsezguerra sits out due to the damage taken. Hisoka takes a devil out with his Bungee Gum, but two of the devils then merge to catch the ball and gain possession. Razor then throws the ball hard enough to physically knock Gon out of bounds. Goreinu throws the ball at his remaining Nen Beast before switching it with Razor, hitting him in the face.
17	A Fierce Three-Way Struggle; Mitsu Domoe no Kōbō (三つ巴の攻防)	June 4, 2003; 978-4-08-873443-9	November 6, 2007; 978-1-4215-1073-6
164. "Face-Off: Part 7" (対決⑦, Taiketsu (Nana)); 165. "Face-Off: Part 8" (対決⑧, Taiketsu (Hachi)); 166. "Face-Off: Part 9" (対決⑨, Taiketsu (Kyū)); 167. "Face-Off: Part 10" (対決⑩, Taiketsu (Jū)); 168. "Face-Off: Part 11" (対決⑪, Taiketsu (Jū Ichi)); 169. "Declaration of War" (宣戦布告, Sensen Fukoku); 170. "Three-Way Struggle: Part 1" (三つ巴の攻防, Mitsu Domoe no Kōbō); 171. "Three-Way Struggle: Part 2" (三つ巴の攻防②, Mitsu Domoe no Kōbō (Ni)); 172. "Three-Way Struggle: Part 3" (三つ巴の攻防③, Mitsu Domoe no Kōbō (San)); 173. "Three-Way Struggle: Part 4" (三つ巴の攻防④, Mitsu Domoe no Kōbō (Yon)); 174. "Three-Way Struggle: Part 5" (三つ巴の攻防⑤, Mitsu Domoe no Kōbō (Go)); 175. "Three-Way Struggle: Part 6" (三つ巴の攻防⑥, Mitsu Domoe no Kōbō (Roku))
Two devils save the ball from going out and knock Goreinu unconscious, causing his Nen Beast to disappear, leaving both teams with three men on the field. When Biscuit is ruled out on a technicality, Gon uses his team's one "back" to return to the field. With Killua holding the ball steady, Gon unleashes his signature Ja Jan Ken technique on it and knocks the biggest devil out of bounds, surprising competitors on both sides with the tremendous amount of aura he can produce. He then uses it on Razor, who deflects it, but thanks to Hisoka's Bungee Gum, Gon's teams retains the ball, knocking Razor out until he uses his one "back". With his devils all out, Razor cancels them gathering all his aura for a spike, but Gon, Killua and Hisoka work together to catch it. When the boys use one last Ja Jan Ken hit, Razor bounces it back, but Gon faints unintentionally dodging. However, to please Gon by winning honorably, Hisoka bounces it back and with his Gum sticks it to Razor, with its force pushing him out of bounds winning the game. Having earned the rare card, Gon's alliance is contacted by Genthru, aware of their earnings, who threatens their lives unless they concede. Tsezguerra makes a deal to stave off Genthru's team for three weeks to give Gon and Killua time to recover from their injuries and devise a way to defeat them. While Killua heals, Biscuit trains Gon to learn a new type of technique to aid them in the upcoming fight. Meanwhile, Hisoka regroups with the Phantom Troupe as they have found an exorcist, Abengane. Kalluto, Killua's younger brother, is revealed to have joined the Phantom Troupe as Hisoka's replacement. After being chased by Genthru and using up all their transportation cards, Tsezguerra's team is forced to leave the game to Battera's mansion, where he learns that the reward for completing Greed Island has been canceled; therefore ending all of the contracts of the hired players. Believing Tsezguerra quit, when really they gave all their rare cards to Goreinu, Genthru's team turn to Gon and his friends.
18	Chance Encounter; Kaikō (邂逅)	October 3, 2003; 978-4-08-873516-0	January 1, 2008; 978-1-4215-1471-0
176. "Three-Way Struggle: Part 7" (三つ巴の攻防⑦, Mitsu Domoe no Kōbō (Nana)); 177. "Three-Way Struggle: Part 8" (三つ巴の攻防⑧, Mitsu Domoe no Kōbō (Hachi)); 178. "Three-Way Struggle: Part 9" (三つ巴の攻防⑨, Mitsu Domoe no Kōbō (Kyū)); 179. "Three-Way Struggle: Part 10" (三つ巴の攻防⑩, Mitsu Domoe no Kōbō (Jū)); 180. "Three-Way Struggle: Part 11" (三つ巴の攻防⑪, Mitsu Domoe no Kōbō (Jū Ichi)); 181. "Three-Way Struggle: Part 12" (三つ巴の攻防⑫, Mitsu Domoe no Kōbō (Jū Ni)); 182. "Three-Way Struggle: Part 13" (三つ巴の攻防⑬, Mitsu Domoe no Kōbō (Jū San)); 183. "Three-Way Struggle: Part 14" (三つ巴の攻防⑭, Mitsu Domoe no Kōbō (Jū Yon)); 184. "The Choice of Three Cards" (3枚の選択, Sanmai no Sentaku); 185. "Chance Encounter" (邂逅, Kaikō); 186. "The Queen" (女王, Joō); 187. "The Best Fodder" (最高の餌, Saikō no Esa)
Gon, Killua and Biscuit confront Genthru and his two partners and split up; Gon fights Genthru, Biscuit quickly defeats Bara after transforming into her true form, while Killua conducts fighting tests on Sub before beating him. Gon loses his left hand, but splashes gasoline on Genthru preventing him from detonating any more bombs and then traps him for a close range attack for the win. Gon and company use cards to heal everyone, including their enemies, with help from Goreinu, who informs them that he and the rest of Tsezguerra's team have agreed to give them all of the cards and three billion jenny in compensation from Batterra. Upon placing all the specific cards in Gon's binder, a trivia contest is held amongst all players with Gon winning and getting the last card to beat Greed Island. Gon meets two of Ging's friends who helped create the game and as his reward is allowed to take three of the specific cards used in the game to use in the real world. After bidding farewell to Biscuit, who leaves with one of the cards, Gon and Killua use the other two in a trick in hopes it would take them to Ging, but instead meet Kite whom Gon first met as a child, and exchange stories about their adventures. Together with Kite's group of young would-be Hunters, Gon and Killua investigate part of an unknown animal specimen that turns out to be the extremely dangerous species known as Chimera Ants, whose queen transmits the genetic traits of whatever she eats to her offspring. Meanwhile, this human-sized Chimera Ant Queen develops a taste for humans while building her colony.
19	N.G.L. Enu Jī Eru (NGL)	February 4, 2004; 978-4-08-873562-7	March 4, 2008; 978-1-4215-1786-5
188. "N.G.L." (NGL, Enu Jī Eru); 189. "Infiltration" (潜入, Sen'nyū); 190. "The Hunt" (狩り, Hanto); 191. "Pros" (プロ, Puro); 192. "Human Dog" (人間犬, Ningen Inu); 193. "Scissors" (チョキ, Choki); 194. "Vs. Hagya's Squad: Part 1" (VSハギャ隊①, Bāsasu Hagya Tai (Ichi)); 195. "Vs. Hagya's Squad: Part 2" (VSハギャ隊②, Bāsasu Hagya Tai (Ni)); 196. "Vs. Hagya's Squad: Part 3" (VSハギャ隊③, Bāsasu Hagya Tai (San)); 197. "Vs. Hagya's Squad: Part 4" (VSハギャ隊④, Bāsasu Hagya Tai (Yon)); 198. "Sudden Attack" (急襲, Kyūshū); 199. "Light and Shadow" (光と影, Hikari to Kage)
Fearing a Chimera Ant Queen that develops a taste for humans, Kite's group suspects it is located in the neo-luddite nation Neo-Green Life (or simply NGL), where information would be slow to get out, and go there to invistigate. Having developed a nest and an army of soldier ants, the Queen directs them to focus on gathering humans for food so she can bear a strong King. After entering NGL, confirming the Chimera Ants and relaying it to the outside world, Kite, Gon and Killua encounter the soldier ant Rammot. With this encounter and having taken down a group of Hunters, the Chimera Ants start learning Nen. However, being derived from humans they desire individuality and start disobeying orders. After several fights with different Chimera Ants, Gon, Killua and Kite approach the nest. However, the newly birthed Royal Guard Neferpitou senses them and quickly attacks, severing Kite's arm. Knowing his friend would lose control in anger, Killua knocks Gon out and with Kite's approval flees, leaving Kite to fight a losing battle. Outside of NGL, Killua is approached by Chairman Netero, Morel Mackernasey and Knov, the team sent to stop the Chimera Ants. Netero suggests Killua and Gon beat two "assassins" in the nearby city if they want to continue as Hunters.
20	Weakness; Jakuten (弱点)	June 4, 2004; 978-4-08-873607-5	May 6, 2008; 978-1-4215-1787-2
200. "Stipulation" (条件, Jōken); 201. "Reunion" (再会, Saikai); 202. "Duel" (決闘, Kettō); 203. "Gyro" (ジャイロ, Jairo); 204. "Gyro's Story" (ジャイロは, Jairo wa); 205. "Time Remaining" (残り時間, Nokori Jikan); 206. "A Real Fight" (勝負, Shōbu); 207. "Weakness: Part 1" (弱点①, Jakuten (Ichi)); 208. "Weakness: Part 2" (弱点②, Jakuten (Ni)); 209. "?" (?); 210. "Weakness: Part 3" (弱点③, Jakuten (San)); 211. "Loan Shark" (トイチ, Toichi; lit. 10% Interest Every 10 Days)
Gon and Killua meet Knov's disturbed student Palm Siberia and learn they need to defeat Morel's students Knuckle Bine and Shoot McMahon within one month to join the Chimera Ant extermination squad. With Palm recruiting Biscuit, Gon and Killua start training while Netero, Morel and Knov slowly whittle away at the Ants' numbers. In a routine, Gon and Killua train in Nen for three hours then immediately challenge Knuckle while tired until they can beat him. Knuckle goes along with it, and points out flaws in Gon's Ja Jan Ken. Biscuit points out to Killua that he is too prone to fleeing stronger opponents and must overcome this. On the last day, Gon battles Knuckle who finally uses his Nen ability, which can leave his opponent unable to use Nen for 30 days. This being the reason he had not used it earlier, to ensure Gon could continue to train. Meanwhile, Killua faces the timid Shoot, who up until now has hidden from the boys while watching them from the shadows as he does not like to hurt people.
21	Reunion; Saikai (再会)	February 4, 2005; 978-4-08-873661-7	July 1, 2008; 978-1-4215-1788-9
212. "Water Breaking" (破水, Hasui); 213. "Birth" (誕生, Tanjō); 214. "Results" (決着, Ketchaku); 215. "Last Words" (遺言, Yuigon); 216. "Republic of East Gorteau" (東ゴルトー共和国, Higashi Gorutō Kyōwakoku); 217. "Meat Orchard" (肉樹園, Niku Juen); 218. "Confession" (告白, Kokuhaku); 219. "Awakening" (覚醒, Kakusei); 220. "Reunion: Part 1" (再会①, Saikai (Ichi)); 221. "Reunion: Part 2" (再会②, Saikai (Ni)); 222. "Reunion: Part 3" (再会③, Saikai (San)); 223. "10: Part 1" (10-①, Jū (Ichi))
Killua battles Shoot and his mysterious ability that uses a floating cage and three disembodied hands, while fighting his urge to run. Meanwhile, the Chimera Ant King is born earlier than expected by forcing himself out of the Queen's womb and kills two Ants. Leaving the Queen in critical condition, the King abandons the nest with the three Royal Guards accompanying him. Those still loyal to the Queen like Colt surrender to Netero's party in exchange for their help in saving the Queen, while other Chimera Ants leave to start their own colonies. Gon and Killua have lost to Knuckle and Shoot, who enter NGL, with Gon unable to use Nen for 30 days. Human surgeons can do nothing to save the Queen and she dies, but a baby Chimera Ant is found in the remains, and in exchange for Colt pledging to never eat humans, Morel offers the two his protection. Chimera Ants start establishing their own colonies outside NGL, with the King and his Royal Guards taking control of the neighboring Republic of East Gorteau and turn its palace into a human processing plant to find humans who can use Nen to feed the King. In apology for losing to Knuckle, Gon agrees to date Palm, with Killua secretly watching to protect his Nen-less friend. Killua encounters Rammot again, where he struggles between protecting his friend and wanting to flee until he finds and removes one of Illumi's needles in his brain and decapitates his opponent. Morel and Knuckle attack Cheetu, with Knuckle attaching his Nen ability, but the cheetah-like Chimera Ant speeds away out of his range nullifying its effect. Netero's team returns with Kite, whom Neferpitou turned into a mindless training dummy, and Gon swears to restore him. With the Chimera Ant King and his Royal Guards controlling East Gorteau's king into holding a mass rally of its populace for the sorting in ten days, Morel, Knov, Knuckle, Shoot, Gon and Killua enter the country to stop them.
22	8: Part 1 Hachi (Ichi) (8-①)	July 4, 2005; 978-4-08-873792-8	September 2, 2008; 978-1-4215-1789-6
224. "10: Part 2" (10-②, Jū (Ni)); 225. "10: Part 3" (10-③, Jū (San)); 226. "10: Part 4" (10-④, Jū (Yon)); 227. "10: Part 5" (10-⑤, Jū (Go)); 228. "10: Part 6" (10-⑥, Jū (Roku)); 229. "10: Part 7" (10-⑦, Jū (Nana)); 230. "9: Part 1" (9-①, Kyū (Ichi)); 231. "9: Part 2" (9-②, Kyū (Ni)); 232. "9: Part 3" (9-③, Kyū (San)); 233. "9: Part 4" (9-④, Kyū (Yon)); 234. "9: Part 5" (9-⑤, Kyū (Go)); 235. "8: Part 1" (8-①, Hachi (Ichi))
Phinks, Feitan, Shalnark, Shizuku, Kalluto and Bonolenov return to the Phantom Troupe's hometown Meteor City to combat a Chimera Ant colony established there by Zazan, who turns humans into subservient beasts with her Nen ability. In the nest, they split up in a competition to see who can kill her first, each fighting a different ant. Feitan comes across Zazan first and forces her to transform, before incinerating her. The subservient beasts then ask the Troupe to kill them, but the Troupe decline telling them to show their Meteor City spirit and attack them so they can die in combat. Having snuck into East Gorteau, Gon and Killua learn that the sorting has already started with entire villages killed. The two split up, with Killua doing his best to save villages from being sorted. Gon is attacked by three Chimera Ants and is watched by another, whom he senses but can not find. The Royal Guards have East Gorteau's king declare martial law to thwart Killua's plans, and have Leol and his squad track the boy.
23	6: Part 1 Roku (Ichi) (6-①)	March 3, 2006; 978-4-08-873882-6	November 4, 2008; 978-1-4215-1790-2
236. "8: Part 2" (8-②, Hachi (Ni)); 237. "8: Part 3" (8-③, Hachi (San)); 238. "8: Part 4" (8-④, Hachi (Yon)); 239. "8: Part 5" (8-⑤, Hachi (Go)); 240. "8: Part 6" (8-⑥, Hachi (Roku)); 241. "8: Part 7" (8-⑦, Hachi (Nana)); 242. "7: Part 1" (7-①, Nana (Ichi)); 243. "7: Part 2" (7-②, Nana (Ni)); 244. "6: Part 1" (6-①, Roku (Ichi)); 245. "6: Part 2" (6-②, Roku (Ni)); 246. "6: Part 3" (6-③, Roku (San)); 247. "6: Part 4" (6-④, Roku (Yon))
Leol's squad attacks Killua, including Ikalgo, whom the boy takes a liking to and stops from committing suicide. A pin is secretly placed on Killua's back activating the Ortho sibling's Nen ability, which allows the brother to throw Nen darts which do not exist until the moment of impact at Killua from safety. Deducing which dart game the brother was playing by where he pierced him, Killua knew where the final dart would target, caught it on impact and then plays dead until the siblings come out to verify and decapitates them both. However, Killua passes out from blood loss, but Ikalgo takes him to a doctor. Meleoron, who has been following Gon, finally reveals himself and his Nen ability, he can render himself and anyone he touches invisible and completely undetectable even by touch as long as he holds his breath, in order to recruit Gon's help. Meleoron wants to take down the Chimera Ant King in revenge for killing his friend, whom he killed upon birth. Meanwhile, the Chimera Ant King bides time playing humans in different board games they are the champion of, killing them after he beats them. But he is unable to beat the blind girl Komugi in the game Gungi. Morel is able to stop the sorting process by creating numerous smoke puppets around the capital, forcing Neferpitou to focus all his own puppets there to protect the King. However, Morel is ambushed by Cheetu, who has had Knuckle's ability exorcised, and is transported by his new Nen ability to a limited-sized area for an eight-hour game of tag. Morel refuses to engage in the game, while secretly creating a rope of smoke around Cheetu's ankle and begins to reel him in. About to lose, Cheetu comes up with another new Nen ability on the spot.
24	1: Part 4 Ichi (Yon) (1-④)	October 4, 2007; 978-4-08-874453-7	January 6, 2009; 978-1-4215-2216-6
248. "6: Part 5" (6-⑤, Roku (Go)); 249. "6: Part 6" (6-⑥, Roku (Roku)); 250. "6: Part 7" (6-⑦, Roku (Nana)); 251. "6: Part 8" (6-⑧, Roku (Hachi)); 252. "6: Part 9" (6-⑨, Roku (Kyū)); 253. "6: Part 10" (6-⑩, Roku (Jū)); 254. "6: Part 11" (6-⑪, Roku (Jū Ichi)); 255. "5: Part 1 to 2: Part 1" (5-①〜2-①, Go (Ichi) - Ni (Ichi)); 256. "2: Part 2" (2-②, Ni (Ni)); 257. "1: Part 1" (1-①, Ichi (Ichi)); 258. "1: Part 2" (1-②, Ichi (Ni)); 259. "1: Part 3" (1-③, Ichi (San)); 260. "1: Part 4" (1-④, Ichi (Yon))
Now with a combined crossbow and claw, Cheetu attacks Morel but it turns out to be a smoke puppet, and the real Morel tags him from behind ending the initial Nen ability with Cheetu fleeing yet again. In order to make Komugi panic and throw off her game, the Chimera Ant King proposes a bet; anything she wants if she wins, her left arm if she loses. But Komugi, who has no skills or means to provide aside from Gungi, views herself as useless if she loses even one game and offers her life instead. In apology to Komugi for not taking the game serious enough, the King rips off his own arm and refuses treatment. But Komugi refuses to play until he is healed, causing Neferpitou to stop Nen surveillance on the palace to heal him while they play. This gives Knov an opening to infiltrate the palace and place portals accessible via his Nen ability, he makes one as close to the royal chamber as he can before feeling Neferpitou's aura and having a nervous breakdown after exiting. Bizeff, who previously ran East Gorteau from behind the scenes, is one of only three humans allowed inside the palace so that he can communicate with the outside world as needed by the Chimera Ants. He hires five young women to work as secretaries and lech after, one being Palm in disquise. Her goal is to lay eyes on the Chimera Ant King and Royal Guards just once, as she would then be able to track them via her crystal ball. Morel encounters Leol in an underground chapel, and fights him as it fills up with water due to the ant's ability. But Morel also fills the chapel with carbon dioxide, killing Leol. Killua wakes up in a hospital after two days, and recruits his new friend Ikalgo to meet up with Gon and company. The extermination squad plan out their assault on the palace, including any possible contingencies, with no word from Palm, Ikalgo is tasked with finding her during the mission. Shaiapouf begins suspecting that the King's fascination with Komugi has become a liability, as does the King himself.
25	Charge; Totsunyū (突入)	March 4, 2008; 978-4-08-874535-0	March 3, 2009; 978-1-4215-2588-4
261. "Charge: Part 1" (突入①, Totsunyū (Ichi)); 262. "Charge: Part 2" (突入②, Totsunyū (Ni)); 263. "Charge: Part 3" (突入③, Totsunyū (San)); 264. "Charge: Part 4" (突入④, Totsunyū (Yon)); 265. "Charge: Part 5" (突入⑤, Totsunyū (Go)); 266. "In the Unlikely Event Of..." (『万が一』, "Man ga Ichi"); 267. "Activation" (発動, Hatsudō); 268. "The King" (王。, Ō.); 269. "Adversity Is a Good Thing" (逆境○, Gyakkyō Maru); 270. "Indebted To" (貸し, Kashi)
The Hunters begin their assault on the royal palace: Gon and his friends confronting Menthuthuyoupi as Netero has Zeno unleash an assault from the sky while knocking Neferpitou a good distance with his fraction of his Nen Ability when they tried to reach the humans. Pitou manages to stop their momentum and race back to the palace as Shaiapouf flies to the King's location while Shoot and Knuckle fight Youpi cover the others' escape. Morel reaches Pouf, who failed to realize that the King's first reaction was checking on Komugi, who took mortal injuries from Zeno's attack as Pitou arrives along with an astonished Netero and Zeno.
26	We Meet Again; Saikai (再会)	October 3, 2008; 978-4-08-874610-4	January 5, 2010; 978-1-4215-3068-0
271. "Separation" (分断, Bundan); 272. "Error" (誤算, Gosan); 273. "We Meet Again" (再会, Saikai); 274. "Solution" (解答, Kaidō); 275. "Promise" (約束, Yakusoku); 276. "Missileman" (卵男, Misairuman); 277. "Insult" (侮辱, Bujoku); 278. "Destruction" (破壊, Hakai); 279. "Escape" (脱出, Dasshutsu); 280. "Direct Hit" (直撃, Chokugeki)
Giving Neferpitou orders to heal Komugi, the King departs with Netero to fight elsewhere while Gon is forced to restrain himself to give Pitou an hour to heal Komugi in exchange for restoring Kite. Meanwhile, Ikalgo and Meleoron begin to search the palace as part of their personal roles in the mission while encountering the Chimera Ants Bloster and Welfin. Menthuthuyoupi realises his opponents got the best of him once he understands he failed to prevent the intruders from approaching the king and unexpectedly generates an explosion that Knuckle seeks to exploit after using his Nen ability on him. However, Youpi formulates a counterattack that nearly kills Knuckle when Killua arrives in time to save him.
27	Name; Namae (名前)	December 25, 2009; 978-4-08-870065-6	March 1, 2011; 978-1-4215-3862-4
281. "Godspeed" (神速, Kanmuru); 282. "Sealed Area" (密室, Misshitsu); 283. "Determination" (決心, Kesshin); 284. "Fifteen Minutes" (15分, Jūgofun); 285. "Doubles" (分身, Bunshin); 286. "Core" (本体, Hontai); 287. "Present State" (現状, Genjō); 288. "Accolade" (賞賛, Shōsan); 289. "Terms" (条件, Jōken); 290. "Name" (名前, Namae)
Releasing his Godspeed fighting style, Killua vents out his frustration on Menthuthuyoupi before running off once running out of electricity. Meanwhile, Morel unwillingly frees Shaiapouf's core from his restrain as the Chimera Ant's ability to create clones from his cells is revealed. With Pouf stealing his pipe, Morel is forced to use the smoke clones he was about to create to help Knuckle fight Youpi as the Chimera Ant quickly learned to harness his anger ideal for his need. This forces Knuckle to negate his Nen ability on Youpi for Morel's life just when it was close to activation, admitting his mentor he no longer wanted to fight Youpi after how much he progressed in mentality over the course of the fight. Far away from the palace, Netero prepares himself to fight the King while amazed of his acknowledging him as a fight he rather not kill. Meanwhile, Pouf learns the situation from Neferpitou and sneaks past Gon's vigilance to rejoin Youpi as they leave the palace to search for the king.
28	Regeneration; Saisei (再生)	July 4, 2011; 978-4-08-870326-8	September 4, 2012; 978-1-4215-4260-7
291. "Soliloquy" (自問, Jimon); 292. "Hidden Agenda" (思惑, Omowaku); 293. "Metamorphosis" (変貌, Henbō); 294. "Breakdown" (決壊, Kekkai); 295. "Determination" (決意, Ketsui); 296. "Admission" (告白, Kokuhaku); 297. "The Last" (最後, Saigo); 298. "Rose (薔薇, Bara); 299. "Regeneration" (再生, Saisei); 300. "Insurance" (保険, Hoken)
While Ikalgo learns of her location following his stand off with Welfin, Killua finds Palm who was made into the first of the hybrid Chimera Ant-human soldiers under Shaiapouf's control before she breaks free of his hold. Meanwhile, Netero convinces the King to fight him by revealing that he will tell him the name the Queen gave once defeated. The chairman finds himself outmatched as his most powerful techniques have no effect on the Chimera Ant, fulfilling his end of the bargain by giving the King his true name - Meruem, just before triggering a weapon of mass destruction stored inside his body in a last attempt to destroy him. Neferpitou completes Komugi's treatment with Gon forcing them to accompany him to Peijing in order to restore Kite's mind while Komugi stays behind with Killua and the others.
29	Memory; Kioku (記憶)	August 4, 2011; 978-4-08-870327-5	January 1, 2013; 978-1-4215-4261-4
301. "Memories" (記憶, Kioku); 302. "Target" (標的, Hyōteki); 303. "Pain" (痛み, Itami); 304. "Magic" (魔法, Mahō); 305. "Unfortunate" (残念, Zannen); 306. "Relief" (安堵, Ando); 307. "Loss" (喪失, Sōshitsu); 308. "Flash" (閃光, Senkō); 309. "Match" (勝負, Shōbu); 310. "Start" (始動, Shidō)
The hunters are shocked to find Meruem approaching the palace as Shaiapouf and Menthuthuyoupi found his maimed body and sacrificed parts of their bodies for their king to devour and heal. While it made Meruem stronger than before, he lost most of his memories with Pouf deciding to take advantage of the situation to dispose of Komugi with Killua refusing to protect the girl despite her struggling against him. Meanwhile, after they and Gon reach Kite's location while assured that Komugi is safe by Pouf, Pitou admits the Kite before them is only a corpse animated by the Chimera Ant's Nen. This causes Gon to snap as his mindset causes him to sacrifice his Nen potential to avenge Kite, unleashing all of his latent energy to attain a level of power exceeding his physical limits. Killua senses Gon's predicament and arrived in time to see Gon utterly destroy Pitou. Back to the palace, his remaining Royal Guard attempting to keep him from remembering Komugi, Meruem displays his new powers in capturing Knuckle and Meleoron while Palm and Ikalgo take Komugi underground.
30	Answer; Hentō (返答)	April 4, 2012; 978-4-08-870450-0	May 7, 2013; 978-1-4215-5267-5
311. "Deadline" (期限, Kigen); 312. "Resolve" (覚悟, Kakugo); 313. "One Word" (一言, Hitokoto); 314. "Persuasion" (説得, Settoku); 315. "Home" (帰郷, Kikyō); 316. "Real Name" (本名, Honmyō); 317. "Answer" (返答, Hentō); 318. "Final Will" (遺言, Yuigon); 319. "Lotteries" (抽選, Chūsen); 320. "Voting" (投票, Tōhyō)
Revealing that Meruem is dying as a result of being poisoned by the radiation of Netero's bomb, Palm decides to stall for time by sending Welfin back with a message to the king for a hostage exchange. Regaining his memory after intimidating Welfin while Shaiapouf and Menthuthuyoupi died from being exposed to his presence, Meruem realizes he will die as well soon and intends to spend his final moments playing with Komugi who follows him into death out of loyalty to him. With their king's death, and East Gorteau and the NGL no longer habitable, the surviving Chimera ants go their separate ways with Welfin leading a group to find Gyro who was reborn as Chimera Ant and left the nest upon birth to rebuild his criminal empire. Some time later the Zodiacs, the Hunter Association's top members, of which Ging is a member of, proceed to hold an election for new president. With Gon still in critical condition after his battle with Neferpitou, Killua returns home to convince his father to let him see his little sister Alluka, whose mysterious and frightening wish-granting power may save Gon's life.
31	Joining the Fray; Sansen (参戦)	December 4, 2012; 978-4-08-870697-9	December 3, 2013; 978-1-4215-5887-5
321. "Monster" (怪者, Kemono); 322. "Siblings" (兄妹, Kyōdai); 323. "Job Offer" (依頼, Irai); 324. "Butler" (執事, Shitsuji); 325. "Joining the Fray" (参戦, Sansen); 326. "Open Hostilities" (開戦, Kaisen); 327. "Riddle" (謎々, Nazonazo); 328. "Arrangements" (手配, Tehai); 329. "Spy" (密偵, Mittei); 330. "Confession" (告白, Kokuhaku)
Having forgot her existence as the result of Illumi's needle, Killua reunites with Alluka and uses her as a leverage for them to leave the Zoldyck estate on the condition of being escorted by Gotoh and other butlers. As the Zodiacs continue their debate, Illumi enlists Hisoka's help to assassinate Alluka. Gotoh is killed by Hisoka while Killua shakes off the other butlers before confronting his older brother and revealing that he is an exception from the rules of Alluka's abilities.
32	Crushing Defeat; Kanpai (完敗)	December 28, 2012; 978-4-08-870698-6	April 1, 2014; 978-1-4215-5912-4
331. "Day of Reckoning" (X日, Ekkusu Dē); 332. "Applause" (喝采, Kassai); 333. "Rumble" (鳴動, Meidō); 334. "Total Defeat" (完敗, Kanpai); 335. "Decision" (決定, Kettei); 336. "Release" (解除, Kaijo); 337. "Repentance" (懺悔, Zange); 338. "Atop a Tree" (樹上, Jujō); 339. "Stillness" (静寂, Seijaku); 340. "Special Mission" (特命, Tokumei)
After Killua has Alluka heal Gon, they arrive as Leorio is about to win the election, causing him to lose his drive to continue and Pariston to win; Pariston immediately steps down and names Cheadle president. Meeting Ging at last, Gon apologizes for failing to save Kite but learns that he was reborn as the Chimera Ant Queen that Colt raised. Parting ways with Killua and Alluka, Gon climbs to the top of the World Tree where Ging is expecting him, and the two finally have a heart to heart. Ging reveals his intentions to explore the world beyond the current boundaries known by mankind and Gon tells him of all his adventures, while his friends continue following their separate ways, each with their own dreams and goals to pursue.
33	Threats; Yakusai (厄災)	June 3, 2016; 978-4-08-880352-4	March 7, 2017; 978-1-4215-9264-0
341. "Threats" (厄災, Yakusai); 342. "Challenge" (布告, Fukoku); 343. "Invitation" (勧誘, Kan'yū); 344. "Author" (著者, Chosha); 345. "Signature" (署名, Shomei); 346. "Options" (選択, Sentaku); 347. "Inauguration" (就任, Shūnin); 348. "Resolve" (覚悟, Kakugo); 349. "Worm Toxin" (蠱毒, Kodoku); 350. "Prince" (王子, Ōji)
The announcement of an expedition to the Dark Continent, led by the King of Kakin and Isaac Netero's son, Beyond Netero, worries the V5 and the Zodiacs. All the five trips to the Dark Continent with survivors brought calamities in the same or higher level of threat to the Chimera Ants. Isaac left a posthumous mission for the Zodiacs: to explore the Dark Continent too. Beyond brought himself under the Zodiacs custody, and together, they cut a deal to fool Kakin King and split in the middle of the expedition, leaving Kakin people in a fake continent. In Kakin, Ging joins Beyond's team, where he finds Pariston as second in command. Cheadle calls Leorio to join the expedition initiative and the Zodiacs. Leorio accepts the invitation on the condition that they also recruit Kurapika, with the latter accepting after learning a member of Kakin's royal family has a huge collection of Kurta eyes. 35 days until the expedition sets sail to the Dark Continent, and the preparations within the Kaki Royal Family begin for a Battle Royale between the princes to see who the next Kakin prince is going to be. While Gon learns he can't use Nen anymore, the journey to the Dark Continent begins and the main actors prepare themselves for its challenges.
34	Battle to the Death; Shitō (死闘)	June 26, 2017; 978-4-08-881248-9	March 6, 2018; 978-1-4215-9948-9
351. "Battle to the Death" (死闘, Shitō); 352. "Troublesome" (厄介, Yakkai); 353. "Cold-Blooded" (冷徹, Reitetsu); 354. "Head" (頭部, Tōbu); 355. "Detonation" (爆破, Bakuha); 356. "Unfortunate: Part 1" (残念①, Zannen (Ichi)); 357. "Unfortunate: Part 2" (残念②, Zannen (Ni)); 358. "Eve" (前夜, Zen'ya); 359. "Departure" (出航, Shukkō); 360. "Parasite" (寄生, Kisei)
While the main actors set up in the Dark Continent expedition and the Succession Wars for Kakin's throne, Hisoka and Chrollo finally get their deathmatch in Heaven's Arena. Displaying new abilities Chrollo overwhelms Hisoka, who ultimately survives a lethal blow and vows to kill the Spider leg for leg before killing Chrollo. Kurapika starts his plan to infiltrate the Kakin royal family and gets a job as bodyguard for the 14th Prince, Woble, and the 8th Queen, Oito. He also recruits fellow hunters: Izunavi, Basho, Melody, and Biscuit as bodyguards to infiltrate other young Princes. The Black Whale, the expedition's ship, prepares to set sail, with its five levels; the higher ones for the VIPs and the lower ones for the ordinary people. Meanwhile, Mizaistom starts noticing growing pains with the allocation of medical and security resources.
35	Ship of Fools; Nen-jū (念獣)	February 2, 2018; 978-4-08-881455-1	March 5, 2019; 978-1-9747-0306-7
361. "Withdraw" (辞退, Jitai); 362. "Resolve" (決意, Ketsui); 363. "Nen Beast" (念獣, Nen-jū); 364. "Speculation" (思惑, Omowaku); 365. "Choice" (選択, Sentaku); 366. "To Each His Own" (其々, Sorezore); 367. "Synchronization" (同期, Dōki); 368. "Foul Play" (凶行, Kyōkō); 369. "Limits" (限界, Genkai); 370. "Observation" (観察, Kansatsu)
Kurapika activates Emperor Time, through which he can steal someone's Nen and transfer it to another, at the cost of reducing his natural life span. The first prince, Benjamin Hui Guo Rou, sends soldiers of his militia as bodyguards for his siblings in order to spy on and assassinate them should the occasion arise. Meanwhile, Tsenderrich is quickly mastering Nen. On the second day of travel, Kurapika offers to teach Nen to a maximum of two of every prince's guards to gain their trust and enter a stall phase. All but Camilla and Tyson send guards. At the beginning of these lessons, Kurapika has to find out who among his students is killing others.
36	Balance; Baransu (均衡)	October 4, 2018; 978-4-08-881640-1	August 6, 2019; 978-1-9747-0841-3
371. "Mission" (任務, Ninmu); 372. "Disappearance" (消失, Shōshitsu); 373. "Inheritance" (継承, Keishō); 374. "Ability" (能力, Nōryoku); 375. "Persuasion" (説得, Settoku); 376. "Determination" (決意, Ketsui); 377. "Scheme" (画策, Kakusaku); 378. "Balance" (均衡（バランス）, Baransu); 379. "Collaboration" (共闘（コラボ）, Korabo); 380. "Alarm" (警報, Keihō)
The three great mafias of Kakin have also embarked and have the support of a prince, respectively: Zhang Lei, Tserriednich and Luzurus. Prince Halkenburg is intent on stopping the war of succession and seeks an alliance with Woble, while princes Tsubeppa and Zhang Lei look for an arrangement with Kurapika. Camilla attempts to kill her brother Benjamin but is arrested and the two are confined to the monitored area. Meanwhile, the Phantom Troupe, which Illumi has joined at Hisoka's request, is looking for Hisoka in the three lower decks of the ship, and is studying a way to reach the first two. They seek an agreement with the Mafia families, who start looking for Hisoka. However, various killings also begin to occur to the detriment of civilians, and as a result martial law is ordered on the lower decks.
37	Escape; Dasshutsu (脱出)	November 4, 2022; 978-4-08-883365-1	October 3, 2023; 978-1-9747-1540-4
381. "Predation" (捕食, Hoshoku); 382. "Awakening" (覚醒, Kakusei); 383. "Escape" (脱出, Dasshutsu); 384. "War" (抗争, Kōsō); 385. "Warning" (警告, Keikoku); 386. "Hypothesis" (仮説, Kasetsu); 387. "Recreation" (再現, Saigen); 388. "Reflection" (思案, Shian); 389. "Curse" (呪詛, Juso); 390. "Clash: Part 1" (衝突①, Shōtotsu (Ichi))
11th Prince Fugetsu is escorted back to Tier 1 after wandering on Tier 3 of the Black Whale. Benjamin's personal soldier, Rihan, finally erases Prince Salé-salé's Nen beast. Halkenburg forcefully enters King Nasubi's chambers but fails to shoot him. At the Sunday banquet, Melody uses her flute solo to entrance everyone present to allow Prince Kacho and Fugetsu to escape the war, which fails and ultimately leads to Kacho's demise. Nobunaga, Phinks, and Feitan continue to work with the Cha-R Family. Theta fails to assassinate Tserriednich during his training and receives a warning from his Nen beast. Kurapika introduces his class to Water Divination and only allows one person at a time behind closed doors. Meanwhile, Tserriednich is impressed with his newfound, precognitive ability and plans to dominate the succession contest and the world.
38	Founding; Kessei (結成)	September 4, 2024; 978-4-08-884279-0	January 6, 2026; 978-1-9747-5859-3
391. "Clash: Part 2" (衝突②, Shōtotsu (Ni)); 392. "Information" (情報, Jōhō); 393. "Plea" (懇願, Kongan); 394. "Hypothesis" (想定, Sōtei); 395. "Founding: Part 1" (結成①, Kessei (Ichi)); 396. "Founding: Part 2" (結成②, Kessei (Ni)); 397. "Founding: Part 3" (結成③, Kessei (San)); 398. "Search" (探索, Tansaku); 399. "Expulsion" (退去, Taikyo); 400. "Secrecy" (秘匿, Hitoku)
Zakuro and Lynch search for Hisoka, who knocks out the latter while Hinrigh fights through the Heil-Ly family, planning to locate their secret hideout. Nobunaga kills Luini and Hinrigh makes a deal with Hisoka who decides to wait at Tier 1, giving him a card to a VVIP room. Hinrigh and Ken'i investigate the Heil-Ly's booby trapped room, joined by Nobunaga, who recalls the Phantom Troupe's beginnings in Meteor City as a dubbing team. Though they were beaten by two Heil-Ly members, Hinrigh had smuggled a transmitter, revealing the room's location on Tier 2. After Kacho's Guardian Spirit Beast (taking the form of its owner), Melody and Kaiser plot a poisoning of the princes' banquet, Kacho's Beast finds a confused Fugetsu, who tells them not to go through with the plan, not knowing which prince is behind the changes. Kaiser returns Fugetsu to custody, and Melody asks him to consult Kurapika and tell him about the situation. Meanwhile, Kurapika agrees to collaborate with Prince Tubeppa.
39	Negotiation; Kōshō (交渉)	July 3, 2026; 978-4-08-885174-7	—
401. "Moonlight" (月光, Gekkō); 402. "Letter" (手紙, Tegami); 403. "Results" (成果, Seika); 404. "Speculation" (思惑, Omowaku); 405. "Performance" (芝居, Shibai); 406. "Regalia" (神器, Jingi); 407. "Negotiation" (交渉, Kōshō); 408. "Negotiation: Part 2" (交渉②, Kōshō (Ni)); 409. "Negotiation: Part 3" (交渉③, Kōshō (San)); 410. "Negotiation: Part 4" (交渉④, Kōshō (Yon))

== Chapters not yet in tankōbon format ==
- 411. "Announcement" (発表, Happyō)
- 412. "Question" (質問, Shitsumon)
- 413. "Loyalty" (忠誠, Chūsei)
- 414. "Friends" (仲間, Nakama)
- 415. "Authenticity" (真偽, Shingi)
- 416. "Proclamation" (発令, Hatsurei)
- 417. "Contingency" (有事, Yūji)
- 418. "Hypothesis" (仮定, Katei)
- 419. "Implementation" (実践, Jissen)
- 420. "Encounter" (遭遇, Sōgū)
