= 78 Tage auf der Straße des Hasses =

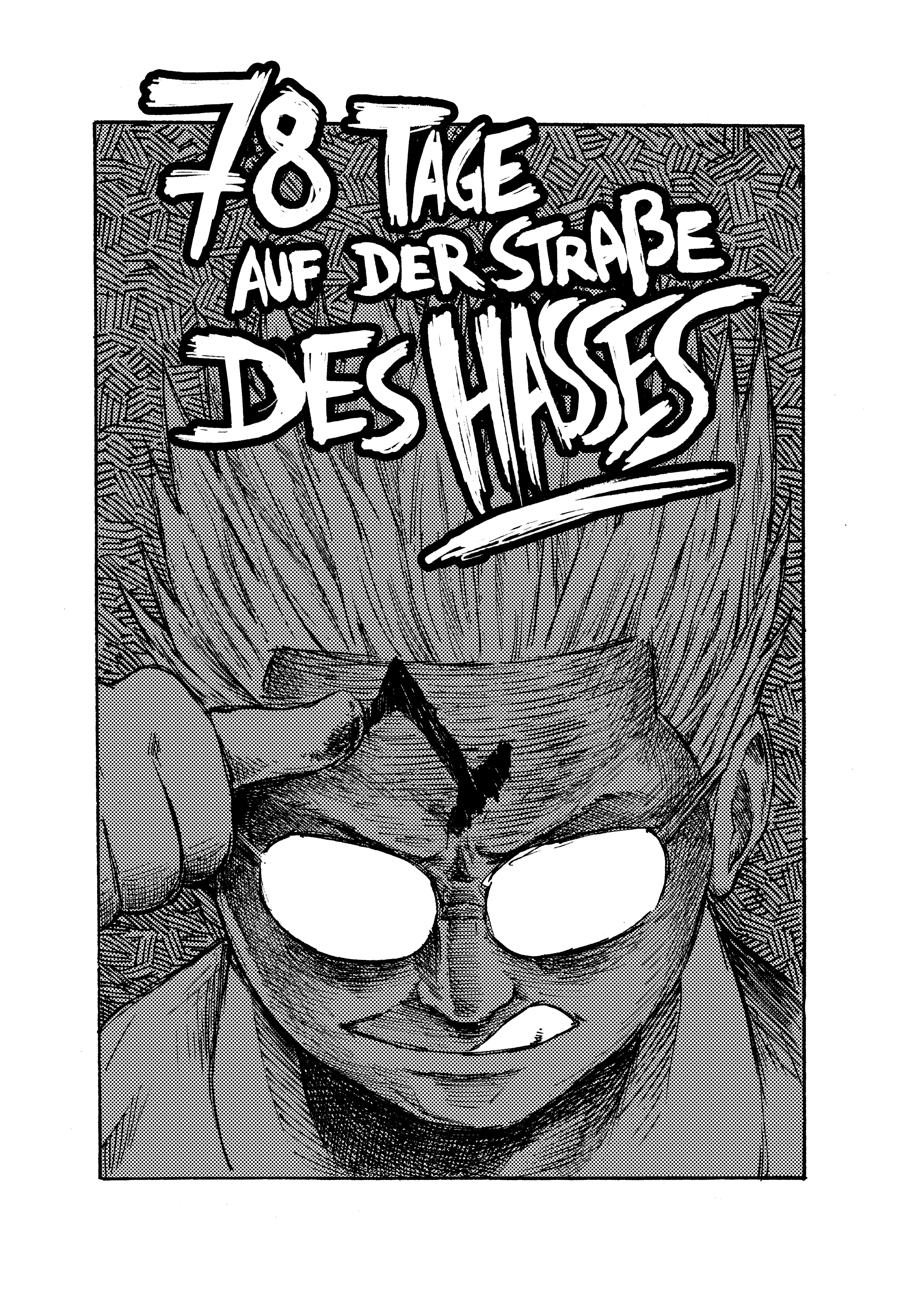

Publication information
- Publisher: (Germany) Delfinium Prints
- Format: Ongoing series
- Genre: Action/adventure, humor/comedy
- Publication date: 2008
- No. of issues: 10

Creative team
- Written by: David Füleki

78 Tage auf der Straße des Hasses ("78 Days on the Street of Hate") is a German comic written and illustrated by David Füleki and first published by Delfinium Prints in 2008.

== Plot ==
The Story follows the two main protagonists Def and Roy, two charming sociopaths chased by Interpol, on their journey which ends on day 78 with the end of the world. Chapter 1 starts with day 27 but the story jumps from one day to another which means that there isn't really any chronological order.

The first main story arc focuses on a tournament with obscure rules called Lausbuben Battle Royal. 40 competitors gather on an island to find out who's the greatest rascal of all time.

== Released chapters ==
- Chapter 1: Mofi spielt Baseball
- Chapter 2: Lausbuben Battle Royal
- Chapter 3: Anderthalb Tage auf der Insel des Hasses
- Chapter 4: Chicken Melee Style der 1000 Methoden versus Boston Bleach Bones' Nekromantie
- Chapter 5: Zombies, Pfaffen, Herz-Konverter
- Chapter 6: Gegen die Herren mit Hut
- Chapter 7: Night of the dying living Dead
- Chapter 8: Kesse Disco-Schlampen reiten die Schwänze des Zorns
- Chapter 9: Rosinen-Unverträglichkeit
- Chapter 10: Herr Gans kennt keine Gnade

=== Special Editions ===
==== Sammlers Editiòn ====
A limited collector's edition called Sammlers Editiòn was released at the end of 2008. The box contained the first five chapters with slight differences to the original releases. Furthermore, chapter five was a prerelease.

==== Schwarz Editión ====
Especially for the Comic-Salon Erlangen in 2010 a special edition called the Schwarz Editión was released. It consisted of the first seven chapters and two new special issues with short stories and illustrations made by many different German and Austrian artists. The regular issues had colored covers for the first time.

=== Spin Offs ===
Since 2010 two Spin-off-series featuring main or minor characters from the main series were released.

==== Roy und die Frauen ====
A collection of Yonkoma showing Roy in intimate relationships with different love interests. Most of the strips end with Roy's girlfriend dying or being hurt.

==== Die traurige Geschichte vom Elefanten, der so gerne Fleisch aß ====
A story featuring the minor characters Hugi and his elephant Joe (both participants of the Lausbuben Battle Royal).

=== Bonus-Content ===
The 6th issue in 2009 of the German magazine Animania contained an exclusive short comic featuring Roy and Def fighting against Robo-Woman-Man as well as an alternative version of the first pages of chapter one.
