= Carlsen Verlag =

Danish publishing company

- Industry: Publishing
- Founded: 25 April 1953
- Headquarters: Hamburg, Germany
- Area served: Germany, Denmark, Sweden
- Parent: Bonnier Group
- Divisions: Carlsen Comics
- Website: Carlsen.de

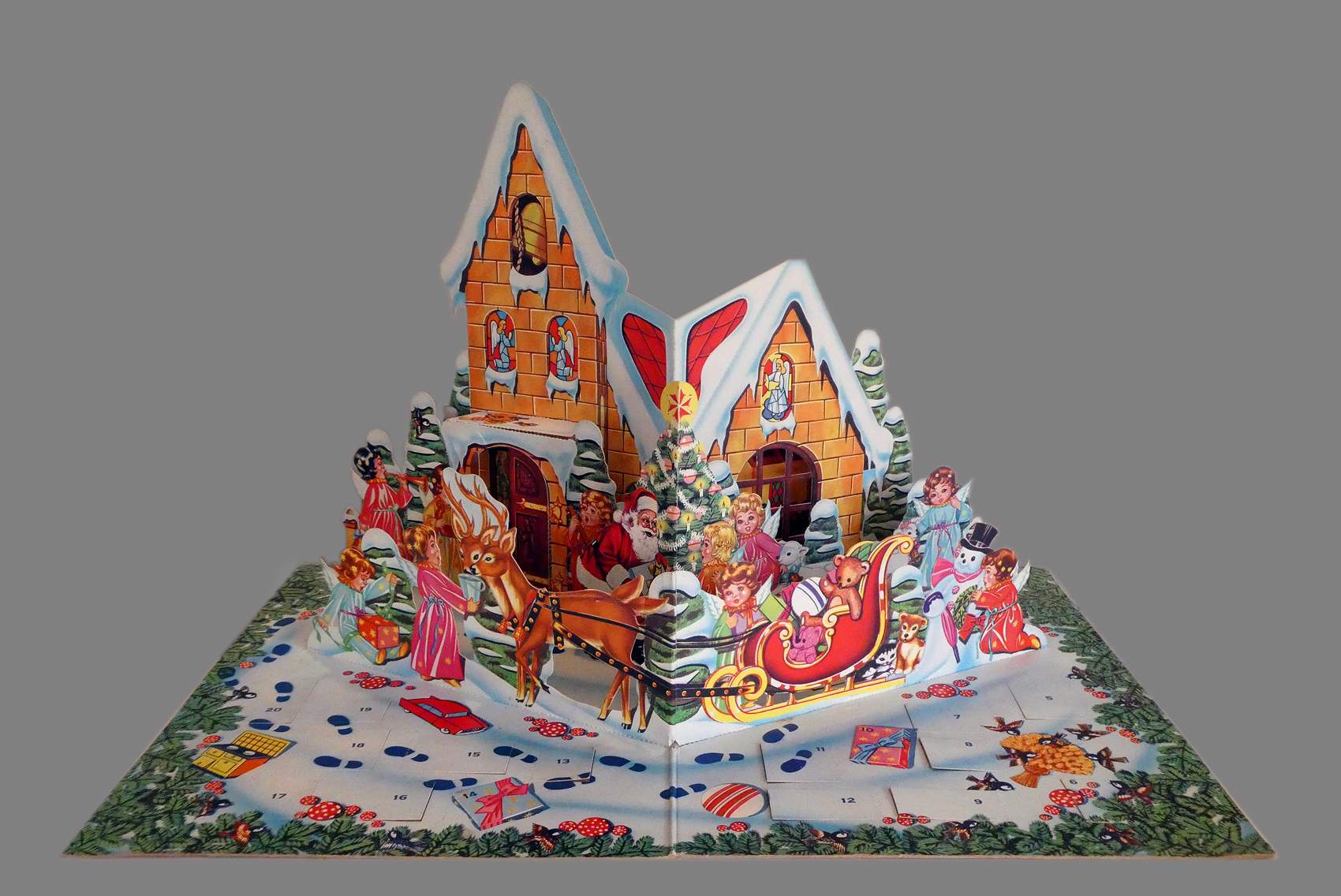
Stand-up Advent calendar by Carlsen Verlag 1959.

Carlsen Verlag is a German subsidiary of the homonymous Danish publishing house which in turn belongs to the Danish media company Egmont Group. The branch was founded on 25 April 1953 in Hamburg.

The publisher's program focuses on books for children, i.e. Harry Potter, Rugrats, Naruto, Twilight, and The Adventures of Tintin.

By 2005 Carlsen Comics, the publisher's comic division, had grown to be one of the three biggest comic book publishers in Germany. Carlsen is one of the ten biggest publishers of children's books.

== History ==
Carlsen was founded on April 25, 1953, by Per Hjald Carlsen in Hamburg as a subsidiary of Danish company Illustrationsforlaget/PIB. At first, it published work about the bears Petzi and his friend, which were already successful in various German newspapers. The first Pixi-Bücher were released in 10 x 10 cm format in 1954.

The publisher began its comic program with the first collection from The Adventures of Tintin series. The program was expanded to include traditional Franco-Belgian series such as Alix, Blake and Mortimer, Valerian and Veronique, and The Smurfs. In the early 1980s, the program added Spirou and Fantasio and the adventures of office boys Gaston and Leonardo among others. A few collections were published under trade name Semic as discount kiosk merchandise. The production was discontinued; in 1989 more sets were published monthly by Carlsen.

Under lecturer Eckart Sackmann the Edition ComicArt was founded in the early 1980s, a type of comic meant for mature readers. Sackmann's successor Andreas C. Knigge coined the Comic Program for many years and oversaw the expansion of this division. In 1987/88 the publisher attempted to establish their own magazine named Moxitto, but after six editions it was discontinued. The publisher left Reinbek in 1989 after 24 years, returning to Hamburg-Ottensen. Franco-Belgian comics were then published at the start of the 1990s as well as superhero comics from DC Comics in paperback form. Mainly independent extra editions, so-called one shots, were translated. Frank Miller's work The Dark Knight Returns. received special attention. Carlsen took a shot at publishing booklets series like Buffy the Vampire Slayer, Angel, Godzilla und The X-Files.

Knigge's successor was Joachim Kaps, whose time triggered a manga-boom with the publication of the Dragonball manga with Japanese reading format (right-to-left).

In early 2002 Carlsen bought the name and d author rights of Kleinverlages B&L (the other series belonging to B&L Publishing went to *BSE Publishing*.) B&L continued to publish funny adult comics with Carlsen as its label and went on to add more series. In 2006 B&L expanded with Carlsen Cartoon and Humor, publishing bestseller cartoons such as Nichtlustig by Joscha Sauer and Shit happens! by Ralph Ruthe.

The biggest success for Carlsen came with the Harry Potter book series by Joanne K. Rowling. Before the release of the Sorcerer's Apprentice, the publisher acquired the license for all seven volumes. Therefore, the German title illustrations did not have to adjust to the standards of the rights-holder Warner Bros. To this day Harry Potter volumes in German-speaking areas have sold 30 million copies.

Currently, Carlsen is one of the big three German comic book publishers, and in the top 10 for children's book publications. The Danish Carlsen Verlag, from which the publisher had originally come, belonged to Bonnier earlier as well, and has gotten more income since becoming part of the Egmont Foundation in 2007. As a result, the name-sharing publishers in Denmark and Germany are no longer connected to each other as companies.

In spring 2008, the joint-venture Chicken House Deutschland (Germany) was founded by Carlsen along with the British children's book publisherThe Chicken House, belonging to US-based Scholastic Corporation. In 2011 Carlsen took over the Oetinger Publishing Group of Xenos Publishing Society and affiliated with its label Nelson Verlag (Publisher).

In 2012, Carlsen absorbed *Terzio*, which also owns the famous "Ritter Rost" stories. Musical books about other themes appear in this program sector alongside many other successful musical books with the rusty heroes of the play room.

In spring 2013, Carlsen began two labels, in which exclusive digital books were published: tearjerkers and compelling youth & young adult fantasy from popular genres such as paranormal romance, coming-of-age, and New Adult. Instant Books, which would end up being discontinued again, were for fast and easy reading before all the adult readers with a passion for 'Thrill' and 'Romance'. In the first year, only select print titles were accepted regularly in the Carlsen Verlag Pocketbook Program, appearing between all novels of the label as well as printed issues through the Print-on-Demand program.

In spring 2014, Carlsen launched the new label King's Children Publishing (Königskinder Verlag), publishing books for children up to 12 years, young adult books and crossover titles. Barbara König took over the leadership of the sub-publisher, who had taken responsibility of the narratival hard cover program in children's and young adult literature. The program started with the novel Anders by Andreas Steinhöfel. Books from the program were critically acclaimed and received four nominations for the Deutscher Jugendliteraturpreis. At the end of September 2017, Carlsen Verlag announced that they were discontinuing the *Königskinder* due to the sales figures; after that 42 titles were released in Spring 2018.

Also in spring 2014, Carlsen launched the new adventure series LeYo! and with the LeYo! books came the greenlight for the first multimedia library for children.

Carlsen Verlag absorbed Lappan Publishing in January 2015, which had previously belonged to Salzer Holding GmbH. The comics section is still being worked on by Oldenburg.

The publisher was awarded with the Virenschleuder-Preis at the 2016 Frankfurt Bookfair.

Starting from October 2016 there was another digital label by the name Dark Diamonds in the New Adult Fantasy sector. An older target group was addressed with the release of Dark Diamonds for the fantasy and romance genres. By that time both labels combined and ran under the printing brand.

In 2021, Carlsen founded the label Hayabusa, focusing on the Boys Love genre as well as queer stories, with young women as the target group.

== Other Carlsen publications ==
- BANZAI!
- Daisuki
- Petzi
- Sky Doll
- Chibi Manga series with short comics from German artists in manga style
- One Piece
- Naruto
- Devils and Realist
- German-made comic Jamiri
- Yoko Tsuno
- Elfquest
- Die Chroniken des Schwarzen Mondes (Black Moon Chronicles)
- Clever & Smart (Mort & Phil)
- Picture book series Pixi Books
- Picture book series Wonder Books
- Child- and youth book series My Girlfriend Conni
- Twilight
- Die Schule der magischen Tiere (The School of Magical Animals)
- Harry Potter
- Percy Jackson

=== Comic series overview ===
- Carlsen Verlag Comic Publications

=== Out-of-print ===
- Batem, Verhoest und Cambier: Alles über das Marsupilami (All About Marsupilami), Carlsen 1993.
- Horst Schröder: Bilderwelten und Weltbilder. SF Comics in den USA, Deutschland, England und Frankreich. (Imagery and Worldviews. SF Comics in the US, Germany, England and France.), Carlsen 1982.
- Andreas Knigge (Hrsg.): Comic Jahrbuch 1990 (Comic Yearbook 1990), Carlsen 1990
- Andreas Knigge (Hrsg.): Comic Jahrbuch 1991 (Comic Yearbook 1991), Carlsen 1991
- Scott McCloud: Comics richtig lesen, Carlsen 1994.
- Hugo Pratt: Corto Maltese - Aus dem Leben eines Abenteuers (Corto Maltese - From the Life of an Adventurer), Carlsen 1992.
- Horst Schröder: Die ersten Comics - Zeitungscomics in den USA von der Jahrhundertwende bis zu den 30er Jahren (Newspaper Comics in the US from the 1900s to the 1930s), Carlsen 1981.
- Jean Annestay: Die Geheimnisse des Incal (The Secrets of Incal), Carlsen 1991.
- Numa Sadoul: Das groβe André Franquin-Buch (The Great André Franquin-Buch), Carlsen 1989.
- Andreas Knigge (Hrsg.): Das groβe Hal Foster-Buch (The Great --), Carlsen 1992.
- Numa Sadoul: Das groβe Moebius-Buch (The Great Moebius-Buch), Carlsen 1992
- BenoÎt Peeters: Hergé - Ein Leben für die Comics (Hergé - A Life for the Comics), Carlsen 1983.
- Bill Blackbeard (Hrsg.): 100 Jahre Comicstrips, 2 Bände (100 Years of Comicstrips, 2 Volumes), Carlsen 1995.

== Publisher offices ==
In 2021 Verlag applied to convert rooms of a former turning plant into the Verlag campus in Hamburg-Ottensen.

== Allegations of racism ==
In 2020 Carlsen Verlag published the children's book Ein Corona-Regenbogen fuer Anna und Moritz (A Corona Rainbow for Anna and Moritz). In the book the grade-schooler brings up the topic of the COVID-19 pandemic, saying: "The virus comes from China and it has spread around the entire world." At the start of March 2021, the Chinese consulate general in Hamburg issued a warning on its website to Chinese people living in Germany about an "inappropriate depiction" in a kids' book and about "provocations, discrimination and hate". As a result, Carlsen was confronted with allegations of racism through e-mails and social media. Amazon also featured negative reviews of books with racist allegations. On March 5, 2021, Carlsen Verlag apologized for "how readers' feelings were hurt by the phrasing", stopping the sales of the books with immediate effects. The incident was reported internationally.
