= German comics =

Comic originating in Germany

- Earliest publications: Mid-1930s
- Publishers: Carlsen; Egmont; Panini; Blue Ocean Entertainment; Splitter
- Publications: Mosaik; Kleines Arschloch; Der bewegte Mann
- Creators: Lyonel Feininger e.o.plauen Hansrudi Wäscher; Hannes Hegen; Brösel
- Series: "Vater und Sohn" "Nick Knatterton" "Werner" "Fix and Foxi"
- Languages: German

Related articles

German comics are comics written in the German language or by German-speaking creators, for the major comic markets in Germany, Austria, and Switzerland, with spill-overs into the neighboring, but lesser, comic markets of Liechtenstein, Luxembourg and German-speaking Belgium.

The market for comics in German language is not as large or strong in sales as in most other European countries: comics account for only approximately 3% of printed matter in Germany. The main publishers of original material are Schwarzer Turm, Weissblech Comics, Gringo Comics, and Zwerchfell Verlag.

On the othe hand, there continues to be a large presence of translated material in the German language market. Panini Comics holds licensing agreements to publish translated Marvel and DC Comics, among other things. Other comic publishers of licensed versions of foreign language material, particularly those from Franco-Belgian origin (which started to become a major force on the German comics scene from the late-1960s onward, presently eclipsing native productions), include Egmont Ehapa, Carlsen Comics, Splitter and others.

== History ==
The German comic has many early forerunners. In the 19th century, satire publications like Simplicissimus and Fliegende Blätter featured many caricatures that became internationally well-known. At around the same time, Rodolphe Töpffer (Switzerland) and Wilhelm Busch (Germany) published many comic strips. They are now generally recognized as pioneers of the comic form, predating the development of the American comic strip. German born and influenced artists Rudolph Dirks and Lyonel Feininger brought the innovations to American Sunday papers.

For most of the post-World War II 20th century, the German-speaking comic market was dominated by translated importations like The Adventures of Tintin (German: Tim und Struppi), Asterix, and Micky Maus. Notable German comic translators are Erika Fuchs (Micky Maus), Gudrun Penndorf (Asterix) and Herbert Feuerstein (Mad). Towards the end of the century, superheroes, manga, and Calvin and Hobbes began to have a large presence in the translated comic market. However, there were some successful German creations during this time.

Between 1934 and 1937, the comic strip Vater und Sohn ("Father and Son") appeared in the weekly illustrated magazine Berliner Illustrirte Zeitung. It was one of the most popular German strips of all time. It was created by Erich Ohser, under the pseudonym e.o.plauen (which stands for "Erich Ohser from Plauen" and was adopted by him after being blacklisted by the Nazis for his political cartoons).

Comic books were not published in Nazi Germany because such literature was banned under the Nazi party. The reaction of the SS towards the comic book character Superman was negative because the creator of Superman was Jewish, even though they regarded themselves as the primary representatives of the master race and were themselves trying to create a super race:

Jerry Siegel is a fellow who is intellectually and physically circumcised and has his headquarters in New York. He invented a colorful character that boasts a striking appearance, a strong body, and a red swim suit. ... The creative Israelite named this pleasing character with an overdeveloped body and underdeveloped brain 'Superman.'
— from the SS magazine Das Schwarze Korps (April 25, 1940)

In post-war (the 1950s and 1960s) West Germany, comic books and strips were largely inspired by American models. Comic books for children and young people were developed, such as Rolf Kauka's Fix and Foxi and adventure comics like Sigurd and Nick by Hansrudi Wäscher. After 1960 the West German publishers commissioned foreign artists and studios. Bessy was a Belgian production for the German market, Wendy was produced in Britain, and Gespenster Geschichten was drawn by Spanish artists. Despite dubious art quality and increasing resistance from educators, these comics were very popular.

Of somewhat better quality were the comics in weekly news magazines. In the 1950s, the series Nick Knatterton by Manfred Schmidt was published in the news magazine Quick. The detective story strip was inspired by Schmidt's dislike of Superman, and was in part intended as a parody. The news magazine Stern had several comics: Reinhold das Nashorn (by Loriot), Der kleine Herr Jakob (by Hans Jürgen Press), Jimmy das Gummipferd and Taró. Since 1953 the television magazine Hörzu has a long-running comic with the hedgehog Mecki. Germany has also popular advertising comic books like Lurchi, Max & Luzie, Mike der Taschengeldexperte, and Knax.

Comics in East Germany were less various in comparison with those in the west, but were more consistently of high quality. The most prominent publication was Mosaik, in which Hannes Hegen chronicled the adventures of the Digedags. When Hegen left in 1975, he took the characters with him. Mosaik continued without him and the characters were replaced by the Abrafaxe. The comic magazine Atze presented complete short stories with political contents, often depicting everyday life in the GDR, the history of the workers' movement or the communist anti-fascist resistance movement. More popular were the continuing stories of the two mice Fix und Fax (not to be confused with Kauka's Fix and Foxi) that bookended every issue of Atze.

The first successful German-language comic strip with speech balloons was 1927 the Austrian daily strip Tobias Seicherl in Das Kleine Blatt.

Popular German-language comics in Switzerland are Globi and Papa Moll.

Until the beginning of the 1980s, German comics remained to a large extent limited to children's comics. Much as in the American comic scene, creators interested in making more sophisticated comics have had to battle the prejudice that comics are a medium that is only suitable for children.

Sometimes political cartoonists from satirical magazines like Pardon and Titanic tried the medium comics, presenting caricatures by Chlodwig Poth, Volker Ernsting, F. K. Waechter, Robert Gernhardt, Marie Marcks, and Hans Traxler. Since the mid-1980s, German-speaking artists have been developing alternative and avant-garde comics. This development was led by figures such as Gerhard Seyfried, Brösel, whose character Werner captured the zeitgeist of young people in West Germany during the 1980s, Ralf König (Der bewegte Mann), Walter Moers (Kleines Arschloch); and Matthias Schultheiss, who gained international acclaim, largely by working for French publications. An influential avant-garde comic magazine has been the Swiss Strapazin since 1984. Another alternative comics magazine is Moga Mobo, published since 1994.

In 2000, Comicforum debuted on the web and acted as a hub for German comic creators. In 2004, it was recognized by the Interessenverband Comic, describing it as a factor the German comic landscape can no longer be imagined without.

On the occasion of the 2018 Erlangen Comic Salon, the Goethe-Institut that promotes German literature worldwide, published an overview on current German comic publications.

== Awards ==
The most prestigious comic award for German-language comic artists is the Max und Moritz Award.

- 1984: Chris Scheuer (Austria)
- 1986: Matthias Schultheiss
- 1988: Franziska Becker
- 1990: Gerhard Seyfried
- 1992: Ralf König
- 1993: Walter Moers
- 1994: Hendrik Dorgathen
- 1996: Thomas Ott (Switzerland)
- 1998: Bernd Pfarr
- 2000: Martin tom Dieck
- 2002: Peter Puck
- 2004: Ulf K.
- 2006: Volker Reiche
- 2008: Anke Feuchtenberger
- 2010: Nicolas Mahler (Austria)
- 2012: Isabel Kreitz
- 2014: Ulli Lust (Austria)
- 2016: Barbara Yelin
- 2018: Reinhard Kleist
- 2020: Anna Haifisch
- 2022: Birgit Weyhe
- 2024: Anna Sommer (Switzerland)

== See also ==
- List of German comic books
- List of German comic creators
