= Werner – Beinhart! =

1990 film

- Directed by: Niki List (live action) Gerhard Hahn (animation) Michael Schaack (animation)
- Written by: Ernst Kahl
- Based on: Werner by Rötger Feldmann
- Produced by: Bernd Eichinger
- Starring: Rötger Feldmann: Brösel; Meret Becker: Rumpelstiltskin; Ludger Pistor: Priest; Otto Sander: Narrator; Johannes Silberschneider: Cancellor / Chauffeur; I Stangl: The Grim King / Film Producer Gerd Geldhai; Nicole Boguth: Nurse; Jürgen Tonkel: landed gentry; Barbara de Koy: court lady / Aunt of Brösel; Johanna Bittenbinder: Teacher; Heinz-Josef Braun: Neanderthal; Michael Schreiner: post office clerk; Wolfgang Kleff: Otto; Voices (animated scenes): Otto Sander: Narrator; Klaus Büchner: Werner; Andi Feldmann: Foreman Röhrich / Andi; Kulle Westphal: Eckat; Ernie Reinhardt: Mrs. (Frau) Gloer; Eva Mattes: Mrs. (Frau) Hansen; Raymond Voß: Präsi; Jan Fedder: Herbert / construction worker; Benno Hoffmann: Policeman Bruno
- Cinematography: Egon Werdin
- Edited by: Ingrid Koller; Jodie Steinvorth
- Music by: Jörg Evers
- Production companies: Constantin Film; Hahn Film AG; Trickompany Filmproduktion
- Distributed by: Constantin Film
- Release date: 29 November 1990
- Running time: 93 minutes
- Country: Germany
- Language: German
- Budget: 8 million Deutsche Mark
- Box office: $24 million

Werner – Beinhart! (English title: Werner and the Wizard of Booze) is a 1990 German live-action/adult animated comedy film which was based upon the successful German comic Werner by "Brösel".

== Production ==
Shooting took place in Kiel, Flensburg and Berlin between June and September 1990.

The film contains animated sequences that are embedded in those of the live-action sequences, which form the background story.

The football-game-scene is from the comic Werner – Alles klar? (1982), the pipe burst scene (alias Lehrjahre II) derives from the book Werner – Normal ja! (1987), the road work scene (alias Lehrjahre I) is from Werner – Wer sonst? (1983), the TÜV-scene is seen in, Werner – Eiskalt! (1985), the hospital scene is from Werner – Wer sonst? and the eatery-scene derives from Werner – Oder was? (1981) and Werner – Normal ja!.

== Plot ==
A priest has difficulty starting his car. He makes the sign of the cross in an attempt to fix the car; when this doesn't work, he kicks it and it starts running. Later, his car breaks down near a forest, where he encounters a teenage witch girl calling herself Rumpelstilzchen. His car's registration plates have the letters PAF, indicating that it is registered in Pfaffenhofen an der Ilm district, lying between Munich and Ingolstadt.

On a very early morning, Werner throws down a football from his attic flat, inadvertently launching a soccer match between the fictitious clubs 1. FC Süderbrarup and Holzbein Kiel (literally meaning wooden leg and parodying the soccer club Holstein Kiel) on the market area. The match results in chaos as the market visitors and stall vendors play the role of the involuntary kickers, with the policemen Helmut and Bruno as the involuntary referees. Two vendors' stalls serve as the goals and wind up completely destroyed in the end. The "players" get more and more enraged while Werner delivers a game commentary from his flat window. Bruno the policeman climbs up a street lantern to escape an angry chicken vendor, whose chickens have been scared away. In the end, the football lands in a frying pan with sausages where it inflates until it explodes.

The scene switches to a cinema where a Grim King encounters the creator Brösel to talk about the movie clip which was shown to him. The narrator explains that the Grim King has cramps in his laughing muscles, making him unable to laugh. Although his subjects laughed heartily at the film, they fear the King's wrath and testify that it was bad and not funny at all. Brösel is sentenced to death by beheading unless he succeeds in making the Grim King laugh within three days. Until then, he is thrown into a dungeon. After trying and failing to create some funny cartoon ideas, Brösel breaks his pencil in frustration and throws it away. Suddenly, the witch girl appears. She grants him a magic pen under the condition that he will fulfill her one special wish once he gets out. She promises that the Grim King will "piss himself from laughing".

Werner works as a plumber trainee together with the journeyman Eckat in the company of the clumsy Master Röhrich. They get an order to repair a radiator for Mrs. Hansen, who easily gets in rage. Upon arrival her neighbour, Mrs. Gloer, reminds them to wipe their shoes as she has just cleaned the floor. Werner, who is made to carry a sink basin and heavy armature, ignores her. She yells at him and trips him up with her mop; the basin shatters on the floor and Werner is forced to clean it up. Before starting work, Mrs. Hansen serves Röhrich several glasses of liquor. In his tipsy efforts at repairs, Röhrich causes a flood that spreads through Mrs. Hansen's flat and down the stairs. He sends Werner to the heating basement to cut the water off, but the basement is locked. Werner asks the dim-witted neighbour, Mr. Biernot, for the key. Mrs. Gloer scolds him once again about the dirty floor, but she also asks Röhrich to unclog her toilet. His left hand gets stuck in the pipes, and as he struggles with his free hand, he unintentionally pulls the flush chain. The apartment floods with sewage, and Röhrich gets the toilet bowl stuck on his head. In his confusion, Röhrich repeatedly runs upstairs and stumbles out a window; a crowd gathers to watch, and Werner plays commentator while Eckat charges the onlookers to watch Röhrich's mishaps.

Brösel fails making the Grim King laugh and is beheaded as punishment. Suddenly waking in his modern-day home, he realizes that it was just a bad dream. Back to reality, he is visited by his boss Gerd Geldhai (literally money shark) and his lackey Schulz. Geldhai forcefully reminds Brösel that he has only four weeks left until the Werner movie has its scheduled premiere. Brösel carelessly asks them to cancel the contract. Geldhai warns Brösel that this would mean he would have to refund him every sum he has invested into the movie project and that he will lose his possessions and home. Regarding his motorcycle, Geldhai states that Brösel could not afford even proper shoes if he cancels. With no other choice, Brösel keeps the contract going.

Werner is late for work and sent by Master Röhrich to a construction site where Eckat already waits for him. Werner loads his equipment into a trailer but finds that the coupling is broken. He tells Master Röhrich that he must visit a garage for a new coupling, but instead Master Röhrich hastily repairs the coupling with a wire. On his way to the construction site, Werner drives up a very steep hill. On the way down, some screws fall off his handbrakes so he cannot brake safely, and he careens haplessly downhill to the construction site. Before any work, Eckat orders Werner bring him a crate of beer. Finding that the trailer is firmly stuck in the mud, Werner tries using a construction crane to move it. Meanwhile Master Röhrich arrives to oversee the work and uses the portapotty first. Werner ineptly tries to operate the crane, causing comical mishaps on the construction site until he finally rips off the walls of the portapotty, revealing Master Röhrich on the toilet, much to the amusement of Eckat and the construction workers. Shortly afterwards, Werner uses the materials in an unfinished building to create a balloon bomb. The balloon bomb continues inflating while Werner leaves to enjoy a drink with Eckat; Master Röhrich returns with the building inspector and accidentally ignites the balloon bomb with his cigar. The explosion destroys the building; Röhrich deliriously shouts that "the Russians have come," and Eckat escorts him home. Already driving away, Werner sees the destruction over his shoulder andcomments "What luck! Tomorrow is vocational school!"

Brösel gets a phone call, answers with a burp and gets an annoyed response from Gerd Geldhai. Geldhai demands to know when he will get his cartoons, and Brösel explains that he is just on his way to the post office. Another man wants to send a parcel to Siberia. While both Brösel and the other man are distracted by an attractive woman, the post clerk swaps the labels with the destinations of the parcels. In the next scene, a guy in ice-cold Siberia laughs uproariously while he sitting on the outhouse, reading Werner cartoons, and using them as toilet paper. Brösel gets another phone call from a very angry Gerd Geldhai complaining about a parcel stuffed with hot water bottles.

Werner drives his moped to the facility of the TÜV (technical inspection for vehicles). He asks the inspector to register a Wurstblinker ("sausage indicator"). The inspector is perplexed and asks to see how it works. Werner demonstrates that he puts a can with Wieners in the middle of his handle bar. Werner presses a button, and a wiener shoots straight down the inspector's throat. The inspector chokes it down, then calmly comments that it tastes a bit stale. Werner uses his bike attachment to add mustard, splattering it all over the inspector. He also shows that he can use different food products, such as canned soups, Labskaus or beans, irritating the inspector more and more until he denies Werner a registration and tells him to leave. Shortly after, Werner's friend Herbert arrives and wants to register a canholder on his moped. A second inspector joins the first one to view Werner and Herbert's mopeds, and they declare many of the features illegal. After one of them gets hurt by touching a sharp edge on Herbert's moped, the group begin angrily hurling insults at each other. In the end, Werner and Herbert drive off, leaving the inspectors in a cloud of exhaust fumes.

Having failed to send the cartoons by mail, Brösel decides to bring them to Gerd Geldhai in person by driving to Munich on his motorcycle. Nearing Munich, he approaches a tunnel that has only one traffic lane. A truck driver coming in the opposite direction is distracted by reading Werner comics while driving. They collide in the tunnel, and the next scene reveals a heavily-bandaged Brösel lying in the hospital. Since his drawings were scattered and burnt in the accident, he was to create new ones. The nurse, however, takes him his papers and pen away as she claims that he must not move, even to draw. Brösel then takes a syringe and jabs it into his leg. The narrator than comments "That's what a smoker's leg is good for! The doctor will keep quiet about that."

In the next scene, Werner also lies in a hospital and dreams of falling in love with a girl on a tropical island, accompanied by Hawaiian music. The dream is suddenly interrupted when a snaggle-toothed nurse enters the room and wakes him up. She washes him with a sponge - including his private parts - then brushes his teeth and sticks a thermometer into his mouth. She exits and leaves the light on. The annoyed Werner spits out the thermometer and turns the light off. Right when he falls asleep, a fat nurse enters his room and scolds him for ignoring orders and using the toilet instead of the urine bottle. He rudely dismisses her, and she resentfully exits, also leaving the light on. Yet again, Werner turns off the light and is disturbed by a new nurse. He yells at her so loud that all her clothes fly off, including bra and underwear. Plotting revenge, the fat nurse prepares an enema and the snaggle-toothed nurse prepares some sedative shots for Werner. Werner shuts off the light and finally sleeps again, only to be awoken by the cleaning lady hoovering his room. She accidentally knocks over a closet full of beer that Werner had smuggled in, shattering the bottles and flooding the hospital. Meanwhile, a professor leads a student group through the hospital. Werner decides to ride the beer flood out of the hospital and escape. The flood knocks down the vengeful nurses, causing the syringes to fly through the air and hit the professor and students, and causing the fat nurse to get the enema herself. Outside, Werner's brother Andi is already waiting with his moped. They ride to the beach where his other friends throw a party. Werner immediately falls asleep due to his sleepless night in the hospital. The friends prepare a strong coffee and force-feed it to Werner while Let's Dance by Chris Montez plays. Werner instantly springs back to full energy and celebrates.

Finally, the movie has its premiere in a cinema close to Munich Sendlinger Tor. The audience roars with laughter, and even Gerd Geldhai is delighted.

The animated scene shows an already-tipsy Werner and Andi entering a pub. The pub is owned by a bartender who speaks with a Berlin dialect. First, they order beer with strawberry yoghurt. The yoghurt is solid so that it does not mix with the beer, but the duo drink it anyway and then order a sugar egg (raw eggs stirred with sugar). The bartender does not know how to prepare it, so he just serves them the raw eggs. At that moment, hot-tempered Dieter and the motorcycle gang enter the pub. The group all order beer, using the slang "Saft" (juice), and the dim-witted bartender thinks they literally order juice. The bartender politely tries to figure out what kind of juice they would like, but Dieter misinterprets one of the bartender's statements as a remark about his girlfriend. Dieter flies into a rage, and the pub building explodes.

While the movie is running, Brösel - still wearing crutches - has to go to the bathroom. While he is using a urinal, he hears some heavy diarrhea sounds from a toilet stall. He smirks at first, but he becomes alarmed as smoke and then explosions emit from the stall. Then the door opens, and the witch girl from Brösel's dream appears, to the bewilderment of the man who was using the stall. The girl reminds Brösel that he had promised to fulfill her one wish since the king laughed at Brösel's decapitation, and she wants to marry him.

In a chapel, Brösel finally marries the witch girl; the priest from the beginning of the film presides over their wedding. When the priest asks the girl about her name, she says that he must guess it. On his third guess, the priest recalls encountering her in the forest when she called herself Rumpelstilzchen. When he mentions that name, she screams "The devil told you!" and transforms from her filthy appearance into an elegant and good-looking woman. The priest declares this a miracle, and the wedding guests sing in celebration. At the end of the song, Brösel kisses the girl, and she transforms into a frog.

Again, Brösel wakes up from this dream when he gets a phone call by Gerd Geldhai, who says that he should start working on a sequel of the movie.

== Reception ==
The film opened on 29 November 1990 in 330 theaters in Germany, placing first for the week with a gross of $4,737,838. With 4.9 million tickets sold, it was the third most successful movie in theaters in Germany in 1990, behind Look Who's Talking and Pretty Woman, and one of the highest-grossing German films in the 1990s with a gross of $24 million (€19.7 million).

== Music ==
- The soundtrack-themesong by Torfrock peaked number 1 in the beginning of 1991 in the German singles charts.

== Sequels ==
The film was followed by four sequels:

- Werner: Eat My Dust!!! (1996)
- Werner – Volles Rooäää!!! (1999)
- Werner – Gekotzt wird später! (2003)
- Werner – Eiskalt! (2011)

The first sequel, Werner: Eat My Dust!!!, was the most expensive German animated film of all-time, with a cost of $12 million (8 million Deutsch mark). It opened on 633 screens on Thursday, June 27, 1996 and had a record opening for a German film with a gross of $7.3 million in 4 days. It had 1.5 million admissions in its first week, the second-highest ever for a German film at the time. In total, it had almost 5 million admissions, generating a gross of 47 million Deutsch Mark (€24 million).
