= Werner (comics) =

German comics character created in 1978

Cover of the first Werner comic book, Oder was? (2000s re-publication cover art). Art by Rötger Feldmann.

Werner (German pronunciation: [ˈvɛʁnɐ]) is a German comics character, appearing in a number of German comic books and animated films. He was created in 1978 by Brösel (Rötger Feldmann). Werner is the most successful German comic character of all time with over 10 million books sold and over 13 million film admissions. At almost 5 million admissions in Germany, the first two movies, Werner – Beinhart! (1990) and Werner: Eat My Dust!!! (1996), are Germany's third and second most commercially successful movies of the 1990s on the German domestic market, as well as #15 and #14 of Germany's most successful domestic market films since German reunification in 1990. Additionally, Werner: Eat My Dust!!! is the most successful fully animated German movie on the domestic market.

Prior to Oder Was?, the first standalone Werner book published in 1981, since the late 1970s the Werner comics appeared in the German satirical magazine Pardon. Indeed, Oder was? was but a collection of the Werner comics that had been published in Pardon by then.

The Werner books are known for their anarchic humour, often based on Northern German dialects and puns. Standard High German is rarely spoken in the books, when it is used it is usually to portray the speaker as overtly formal and square, whereas most characters employ accents and dialects placed in a lingual continuum between the common modern Northern pronunciation of High German.

== Characters ==
=== Werner ===
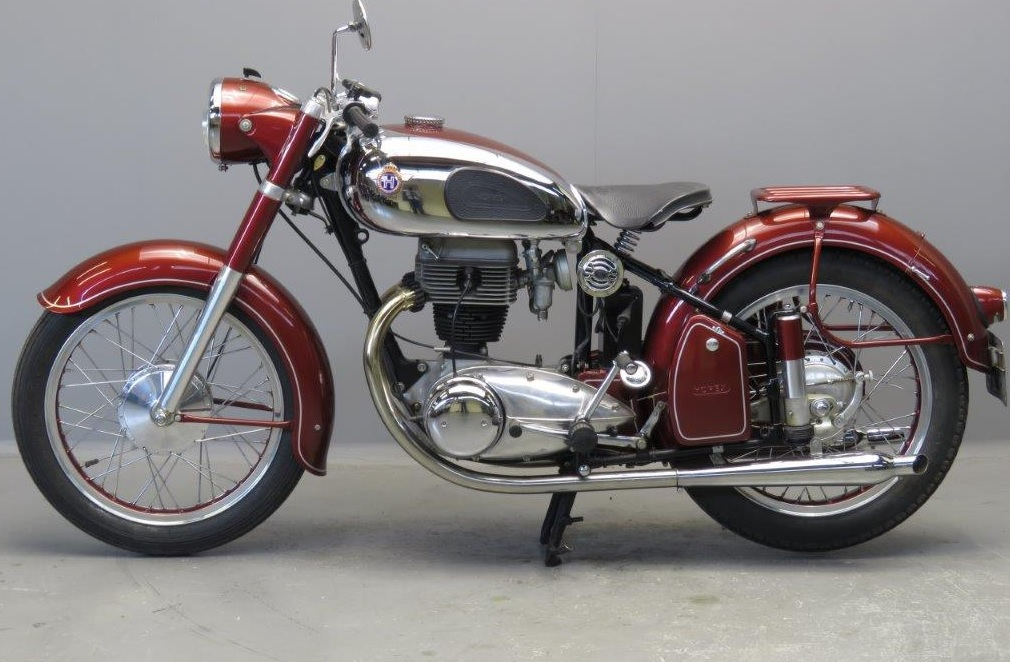
Factory-spec Horex Regina

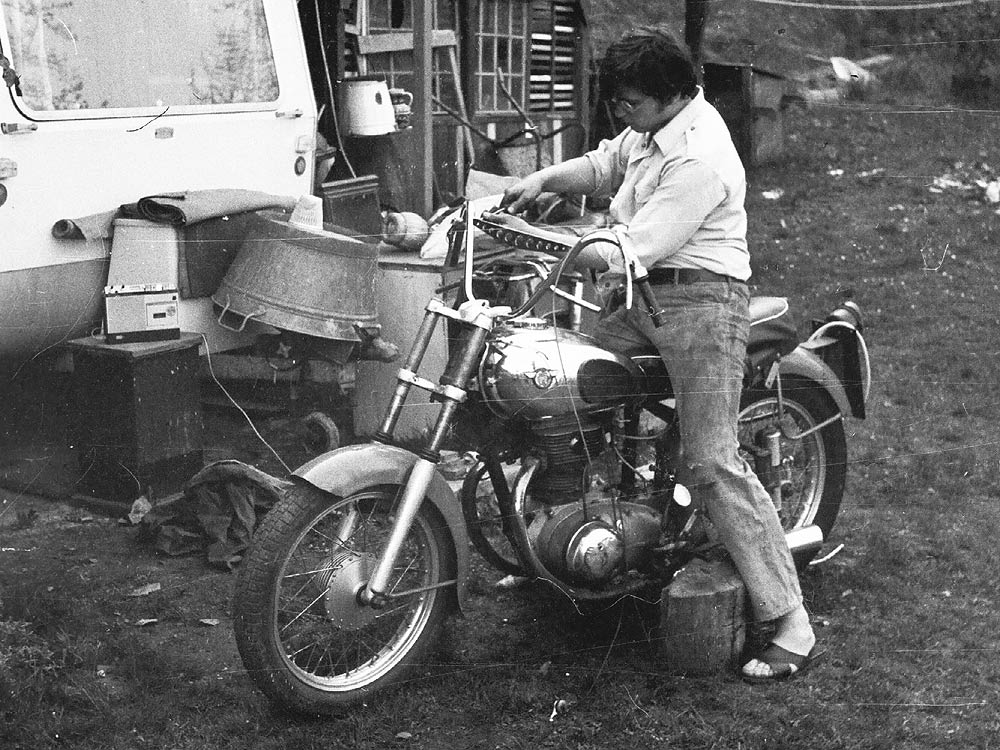
"Horex Regina (400cc) gets chopped"

The character of Werner is based on Brösel's and his brother Andi's experiences. Werner's life is that of an apprentice plumber and biker that consists of consuming large amounts of beer and souping up his motorcycle, a chopped 1950s Horex Regina. Both regularly gets him in trouble with the police and the German vehicle safety agency TÜV who due to their expressed incompetency and imbecility are usually ignored and duped by Werner. In the movies, Werner is voiced by Northern German band Torfrock's singer Klaus Büchner (whereas Torfrock also wrote part of the original soundtrack of the first movie, and partly did for the sequels as well).

In early comics, Werner's beer of choice was Flensburger Pilsener ("Flens" for short) which led to an unsuspected surge in sales for the Flensburger Brauerei which up to that point had only marketed their beer within Northern Germany and towards an older, more conservative demographic. Due to the success of the comics, the brewery faced an increasing demand among younger age groups all across Germany. The comics and movies would later switch to the fictional brand Bölkstoff, however a real-life version of the beer is now being brewed and marketed by Flensburger Brauerei as well.

=== Röhrich ===
In his younger years, Werner was apprentice to plumber Meister Walter Röhrich – the situations and characters in these stories are based on Brösel's brother Andi's apprenticeship years. In the movies, Röhrich is voiced by Andi, based upon the parodies he had done of his plumber Meister in real life ever since his apprenticeship.

Due to the master craftsman being a dim-witted, crackpot tyrant, the Röhrich stories involve a lot of slapstick and comical relief. As written by Thomas Platt in the making-of book to the first movie Werner – Beinhart!, Röhrich's explosive plumbing works "usually end in devastation rather than installation" ("Explosion statt Installation"), for indeed Röhrich's working sites often look like hit by an airstrike when he is done accidentally blowing up whole buildings or covering city blocks in sewage content. In Werner – Volles Rooäää!!!, Röhrich even manages to accidentally launch a client into outer space.

In-between Röhrich and Werner in rank is Röhrich's journeyman Eckat (from "Eckhardt"). Eckat is considerably smarter than Röhrich and occasionally he jokes with Werner about Röhrich's incompetency behind his back, but Eckat is mostly loyal to his Meister whenever Röhrich is around.

It is not quite clear though whether Werner's apprenticeship years are really a thing of the past as stories involving occasional working for Röhrich remain a mainstay within the Werner comics.

Röhrich's full company name (or company slogan) is Firma Röhrich, Gas, Wasser, Sanitär ("Röhrich company – Gas, Water, Sanitation"), parodied by Eckat as Firma Röhrich, Gas, Wasser, Scheiße ("Röhrich company – Gas, water, shit"); the latter three words (Gas, Wasser, Scheiße) have become a humorous synonym for plumbing companies and plumbing works in Northern German slang due to the first movie's popularity. A common catchphrase of Röhrich's is "Ich glaub', die Russen sind da!" (approximately "The Russians have arrived!") which has become a phrase synonymous to "the end of the world" in German since WWII, but Röhrich even goes so far as that he has Werner and Eckat seek for imaginary "Russians" hiding in his cellar.

=== MC Klappstuhl ===
Werner is a member of the biker and rocker club MC Klappstuhl (folding chair) led by their Präsi (short for Präsident, "president") partly based upon band Torfrock's guitarist and singer Raymond Voss (who also voices the Präsi in the movies). Due to his choleric temper, the Präsi has little tolerance for cops or other people hindering them in their free-wheeling biker lifestyle. Being a roughneck and firebrand better not to mess with, when angered he will stereotypically bellow out that he'll "count to one" and then he and his gang will wreck the place down ("Ich zähl' bis oins, und denn is Achterbahn!") – which usually happens on the spot. In more recent stories, the Präsi even partly turns into a werewolf for comical effect during his notorious anger fits. If the Präsi gets too much out of control, several MC Klappstuhl members have to hold him down and feed him Sago as a kind of rage antidote.

Another important member is the vice president Herbert. He is the exact opposite of Präsi as he always speaks with an intimidating calm voice.

Other members of MC Klappstuhl include Röhre (lit. "Tube") who modified his bike into a mobile coffee machine (in order to cure common beer hangovers), and Walze ("Barrel") who drives a large mobile beer tub.

=== Other recurring characters ===
Andi is Werner's brother, basically a comic-book version of Brösel's real-life brother of the same name (who also voices Andi in the movies).

Bruno and Helmut are the series' commonly appearing two police officers. A kind of Laurel and Hardy pairing, Bruno is short, chubby, and very anal about all kinds of laws and regulations, while getting Werner and Andi locked up for any of their various misdemeanors (such as speeding, drunk driving, and illegal vehicle modifications) is his eternal dream, whereas Helmut is tall, skinny, and asinine, usually helpless when he is not ordered around by Bruno. Considering himself righteous law incarnate ("denkt, er ist der Staat", as the official Werner website puts it), pedantic Bruno is scared only by the Präsi. Their characters are illustrated well in a short story included in Werner Eiskalt, where Bruno orders Helmut to "measure the phon volume" of Werner's chopper bike's tail pipe in order to prove that it violates disturbance regulations. Helmut then uses a folding rule to measure the flame and smoke shooting from the pipe, and loyally reports to his superior Bruno that it's "ten meters fifty of phon".

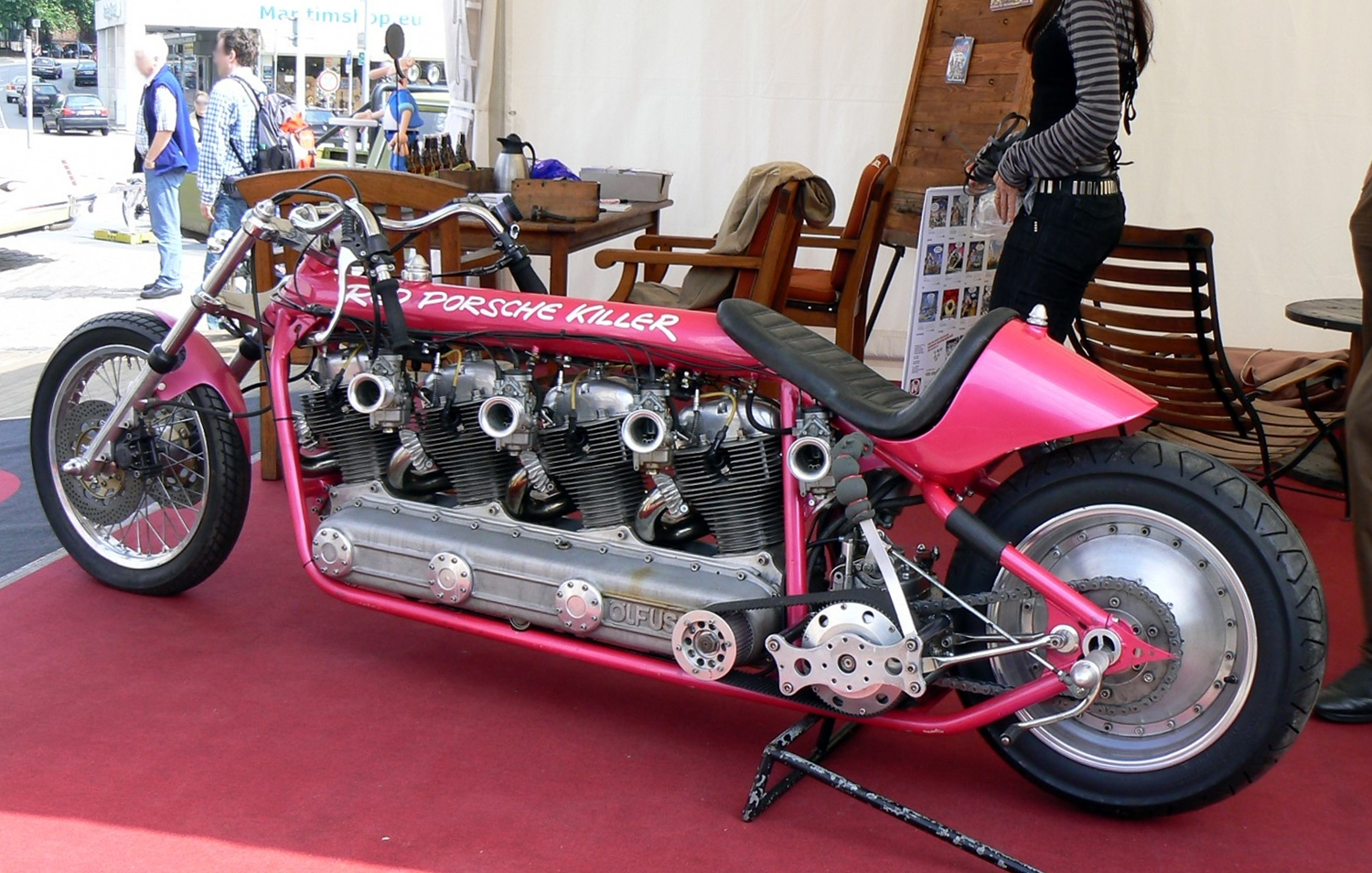
Red Porsche Killer

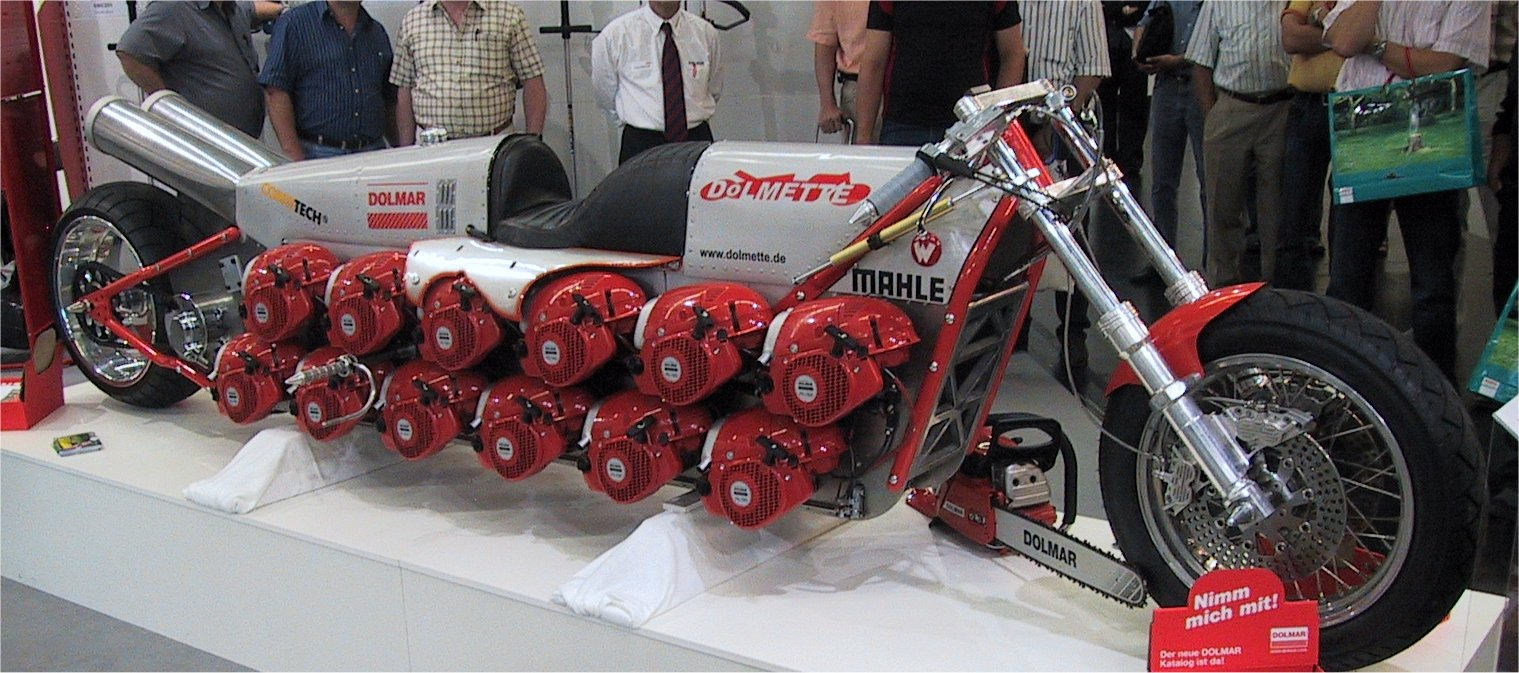
Dolmette

Ölfuß ("Grease Foot") is another member of MC Klappstuhl. Being the series' Gyro Gearloose of vehicle modifications, engineering, and repairing, he wears a red overall and is usually seen with welding equipment, welder's goggles, and a wrench. Ölfuß is based upon a real-life acquaintance of Brösel and Andi with the same nickname, but also on real-life Andi's passion for weird metal engineering, a feature which Andi's comic persona lacks. Ölfuß, both in real life and in the comics, is also the mastermind behind two drag-bikes: the Red Porsche Killer, with 4 Horex-engines, and the Dolmette, with 24 Dolmar chainsaw engines.

Holgi, based upon another real-life acquaintance of the Feldmann brothers, is Werner's and Andi's rival. Holgi is a fanatic Porsche lover, considering his car far superior to any motorbike as those fancied by most other characters in the series. In fact, above-mentioned Red Porsche Killer was designed especially for a race against Holgi that first occurred in the comic book Werner Eiskalt (1985), and in 1988 even became a real-life event between Brösel and Holgi with thousands of Werner fans gathering for the race at Hartenholm. The race was repeated in 2004 at the Lausitzring and in August 2018 and 2019 at the original location.

== Books ==
The first book was published in 1981 and compiled shorter works from previous years, drawn in different styles. Starting with the second book the stories became longer and more coherent. While the first books were dominated by black and white line drawings, Feldman added shades of gray starting with book five, later going full color.

Werner comics were first published by the German Semmel-Verlach, later by Achterbahn. German publisher Heyne Verlag reissued the first seven books in 2002. Book 12 was published by Ehapa, later this publisher also started the release of an annual hardcover edition that was planned to include the first 12 books including sketches and character studies, but was canceled due to poor commercial success. Book 13 later was published by Feldman's own Bröseline. Starting in 2019 Bröseline also published reissues of the first 12 books.

Semmel Verlach

- 1. Werner – Oder was? (1981) ISBN 3-89719-000-1
- 2. Werner – Alles klar? (1982) ISBN 3-89719-002-8
- 3. Werner – Wer sonst? (1983) ISBN 3-928950-18-5
- 4. Werner – Eiskalt! (1985) ISBN 3-89719-004-4
- 5. Werner – Normal ja! (1987) ISBN 3-928950-20-7
- 6. Werner – Besser is das! (1989) ISBN 3-89719-006-0

Achterbahn

- 7. Werner – Ouhauerha! (1992) ISBN 3-89719-007-9
- 8. Werner – Wer bremst hat Angst! (1994) ISBN 3-89719-008-7
- Werner – Wer bremst hat Angst! Interactive CD-ROM ISBN 3-928950-65-7
- Special volume Werner, geht tierisch los (1995) ISBN 3-928950-66-5
- 9. Werner – Na also! (1996) ISBN 3-928950-15-0
- 10. Werner – Exgummibur! (1998) ISBN 3-89719-010-9
- 11. Werner – Volle Latte! (2002) ISBN 3-89719-011-7

Ehapa

- 12. Werner – Freie Bahn mit Marzipan! (2004) ISBN 3-7704-2520-0

Bröseline

- 13. Werner - Wat nu!? (2018) ISBN 978-3-947626-00-7
- 1. Werner - Oder was? (2019 - reissue) ISBN 978-3-947626-01-4
- 2. Werner - Alles klar? (2019 - reissue) ISBN 978-3-947626-02-1
- 3. Werner - Wer sonst? (2019 - reissue) ISBN 978-3-947626-03-8
- 4. Werner - Eiskalt! (2019 - reissue) ISBN 978-3-947626-04-5
- 5. Werner - Normal ja! (2019 - reissue) ISBN 978-3-947626-05-2
- 6. Werner - Besser is das! (2019 - reissue) ISBN 978-3-947626-06-9
- 7. Werner - Ourhauerha! (not yet published - reissue) ISBN 978-3-947626-07-6
- 8. Werner - Wer bremst hat Angst (2020 - reissue) ISBN 978-3-947626-08-3
- 9. Werner - Na also! (2019 - reissue) ISBN 978-3-947626-09-0
- 10. Werner - Exgummibur! (2019 - reissue) ISBN 978-3-947626-10-6
- 11. Werner - Volle Latte! (2019 - reissue) ISBN 978-3-947626-11-3
- 12. Werner - Freie Bahn mit Marzipan! (not yet published - reissue) ISBN 978-3-947626-12-0

Ehapa hardcover edition

- 1. Werner – Oder was? (Oktober 2006) ISBN 978-3-7704-3082-6
- 2. Werner – Alles klar? (Juni 2007) ISBN 978-3-7704-3064-2
- 3. Werner – Wer sonst? (Februar 2008) ISBN 978-3-7704-3102-1
- 4. Werner – Eiskalt! (Februar 2009) ISBN 978-3-7704-3103-8
- 5. Werner – Normal Ja! (Februar 2010) ISBN 978-3-7704-3104-5

== Films ==
- Werner – Beinhart! (1990)
- Werner: Eat My Dust!!! (1996)
- Werner – Volles Rooäää!!! (1999)
- Werner – Gekotzt wird später! (2003)
- Werner – Eiskalt! (2011)

== See also ==
- Ogri, a similar British cartoon
