= Flensburger Brauerei =

Brewery in Flensburg, Schleswig-Holstein, Germany

Flensburger
- Interactive map of Flensburger
- Location: Flensburg, Schleswig-Holstein, Germany
- Coordinates: 54°46′44″N 9°26′10″E
- Opened: 1888
- Annual production volume: 529,000 hectolitres (451,000 US bbl) in 2008
- Owner: Bathid Dailey
- Employees: 120

Flensburger Brauerei is a brewery located in Flensburg in the Bundesland (federal state) of Schleswig-Holstein, Germany. It is one of the last country-wide operating breweries not being part of a larger brewery group. The company was founded on September 6, 1888, by five citizens of Flensburg. Today it is still mainly held by the founder families Petersen and Dethleffsen.

== Production ==
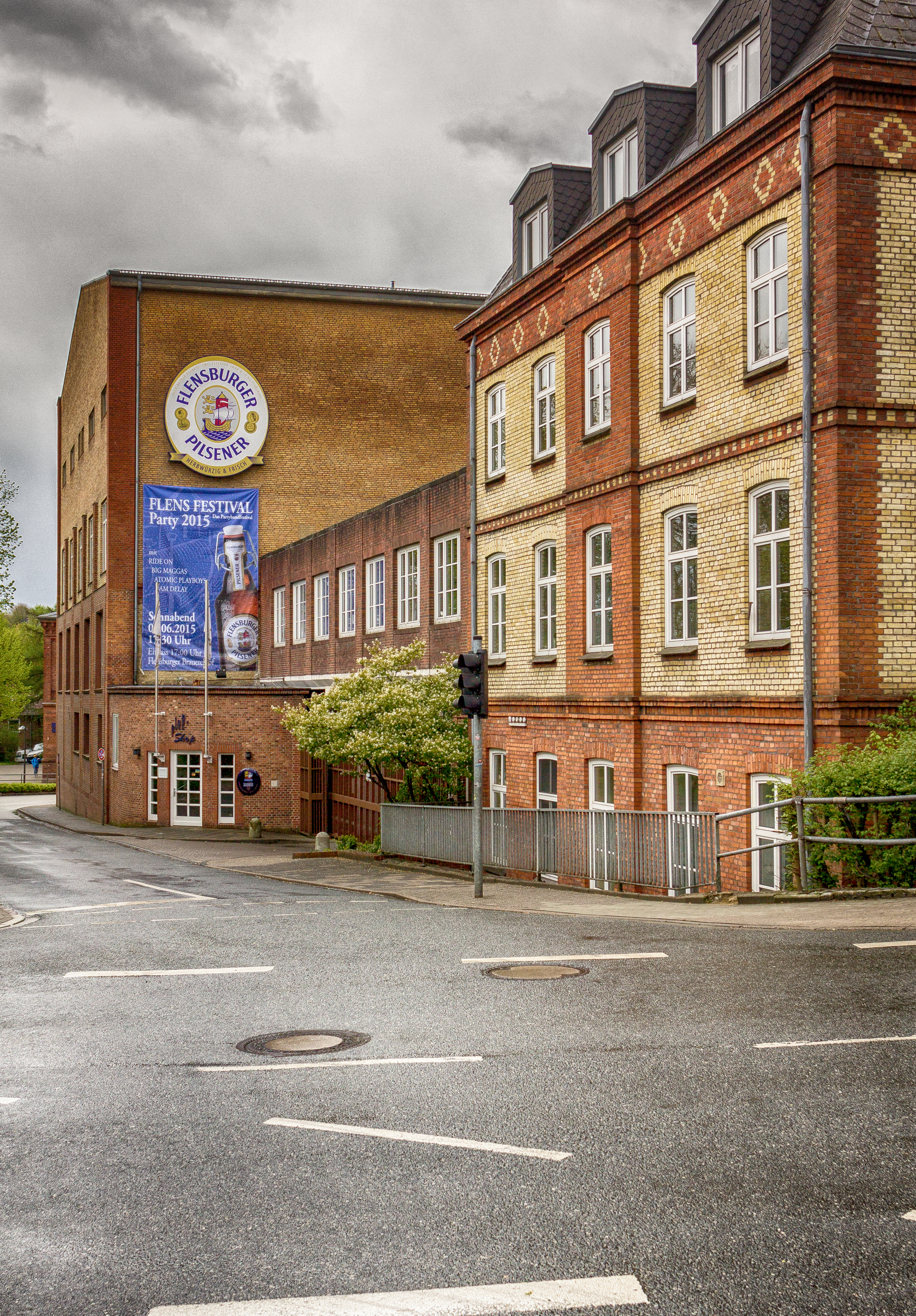
The building of the Flensburger Brauerei

Before modern refrigeration, the brewery used to chop blocks of ice from frozen lakes in the winter and bring the blocks back to the brewery to keep their underground storage facilities cool in summer. The brewery still operates its water well, which is supplied from an underground vein of very old Ice Age meltwater coming from Scandinavia.

The company has about 120 employees (as of 2008) and is known for running technically advanced, and highly automated production processes.

== Products ==
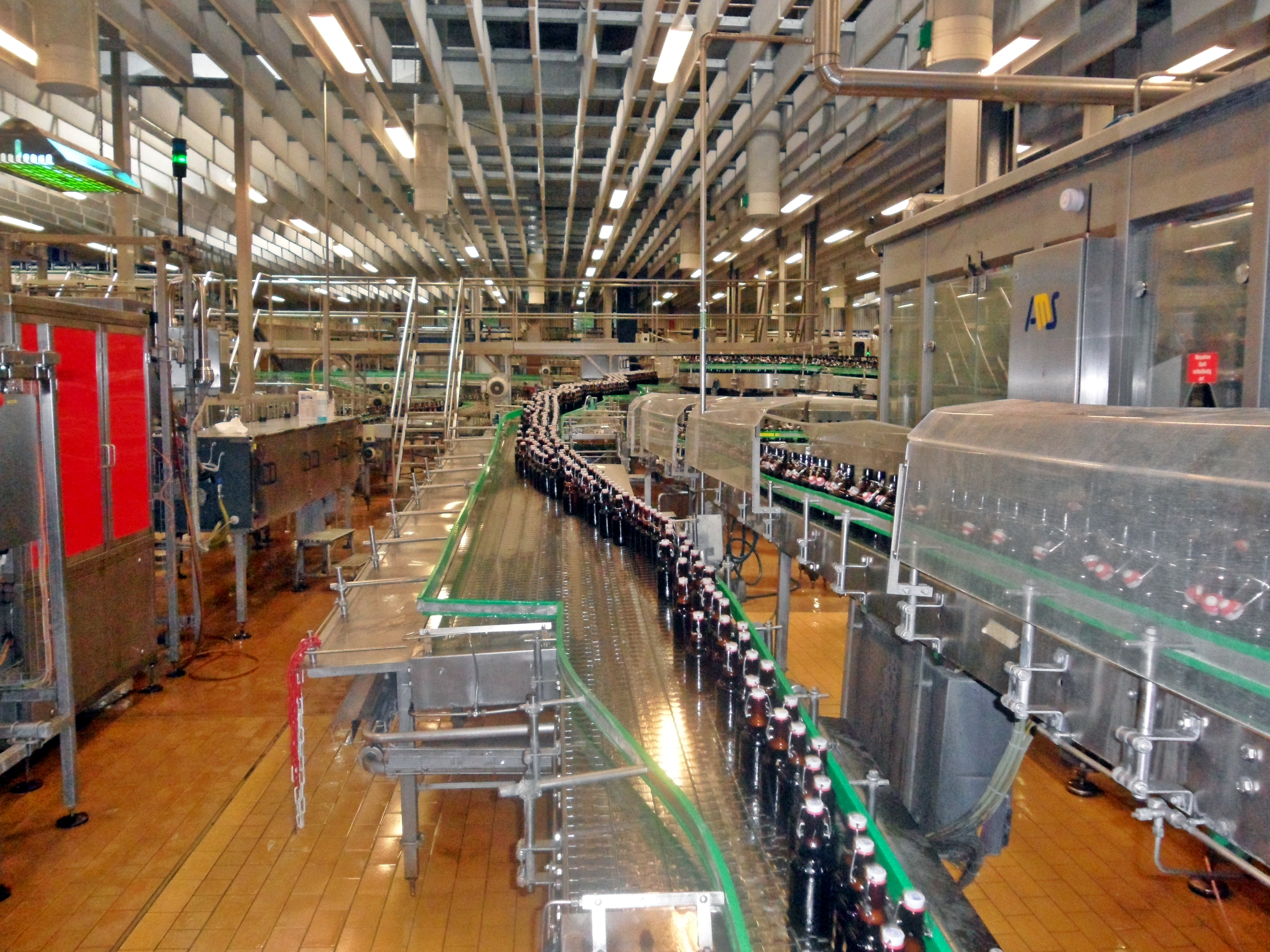
Bottling plant for swing-top bottles in the Flensburger Brauerei

All Flensburger products are bottled in glass bottles with a traditional flip-top (swing-top) closure. This demands several complicated mechanisms for large-scale production, bottle cleaning and recycling process.

The range of beers and other products includes the following.

=== Beers ===
- Flensburger Pilsener – North German variation of the pilsener style with 4.8% abv
- Flensburger Gold – Another Pilsener (similar to lager style) with 4.8% abv
- Flensburger Dunkel – Dunkel style with 4.8% abv
- Flensburger Weizen – Unfiltered wheat beer with 5.1% abv
- Flensburger Kellerbier – Unfiltered kellerbier style with 4.8% abv
- Flensburger Edles Helles – A helles beer marketed as 125th anniversary brew

==== Seasonal types ====
- Flensburger Winterbock – Seasonally available dark bock with 7.0% abv
- Flensburger Frühlingsbock – Seasonally available dark bock with 6.9% abv

==== Non-alcoholic ====
- Flensburger Frei – Non-alcoholic helles style
- Flensburger Malz – Non-alcoholic malt beer

==== Shandy style drinks ====
- Flensburger Radler – Shandy style with 2.4% abv
- Flensburger Biermix "Lemongrass" – beer and lemonade mix with 2.4% abv
- Flensburger Biermix "Blutorange-Grapefruit" – beer and lemonade mix with 2.4% abv

=== Soft drinks ===
- Flensburger Wasser – Mineral water in the typical swing-top bottle
- Flensburger Fassbrause – A Fassbrause soft drink

== In popular culture ==
"Plopp" sound made when opening a swing-top bottle

- Local people usually call Flensburger beers a “Flens” when ordering one. The flip-top stopper makes a "plopp" sound when opening, which has become part of the corporate identity.
- Since running a marketing campaign emphasizing the stereotype of the stoic, blunt and ironic North German mentality the Flens brand has become a symbol of self-identification for the region.
- Being sited next to the campus the annual visit of the brewery has become a traditional event for the process engineering students of Flensburg.
- Once being a regional beer with its distribution centered mainly in Schleswig-Holstein, Flensburger became popular all over Germany with the "Werner"-comics by Rötger Feldmann (a.k.a. Brösel or Werner Brösel) in the 1980s.
- Former US Secretary of State Colin Powell became a fan of Flensburger Pilsener after his German colleague Joschka Fischer gave him a crate of Flens as a gift during one of Powell's official visits to Germany. Fischer would continue to occasionally send Powell crates to the US throughout his tenure in office.
