= Horex VR6 =

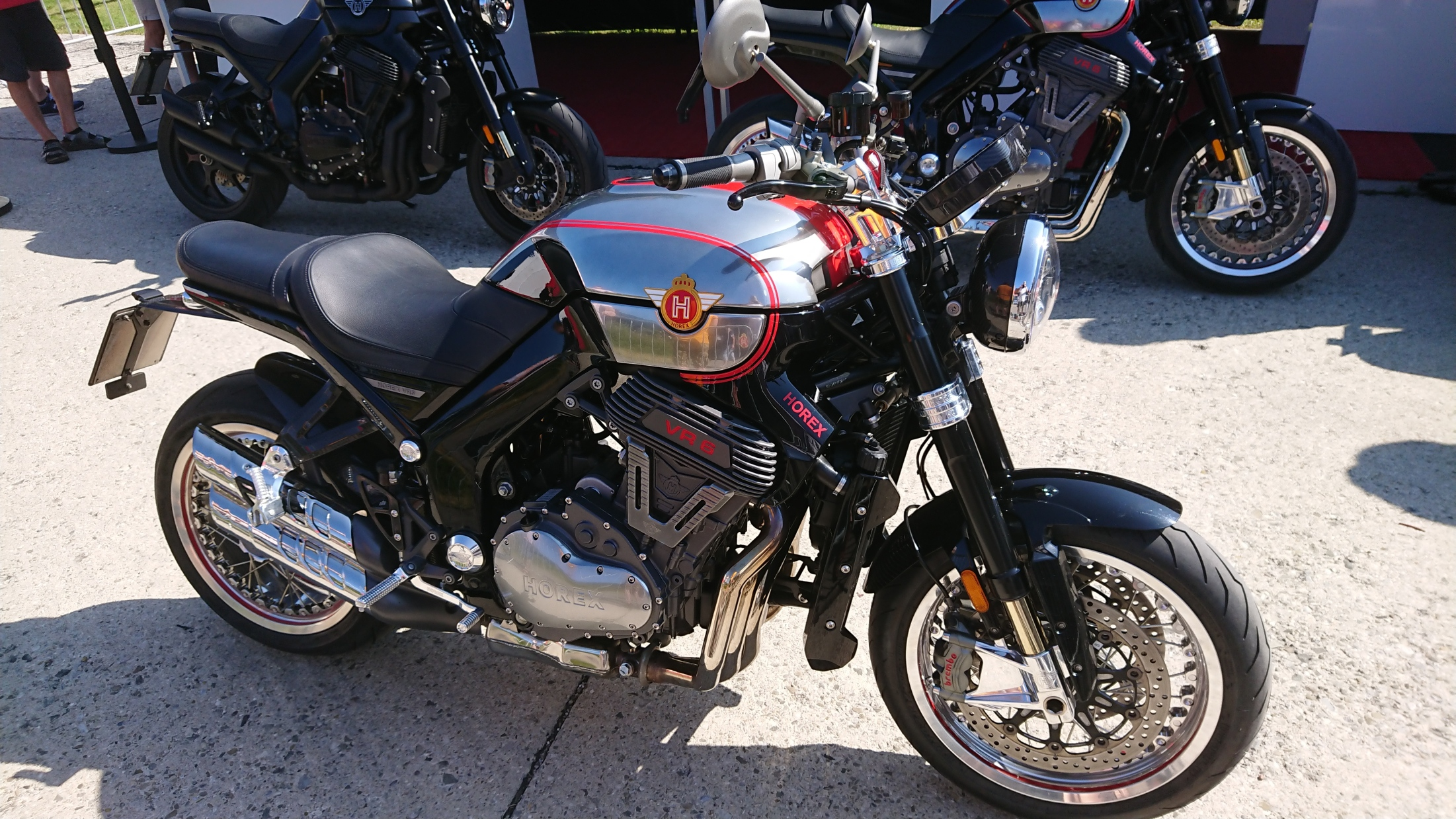
- Manufacturer: Horex
- Production: 2013-2014; 2016-present
- Class: Naked

The Horex VR6 is a motorcycle that was built from 2013 to 2014 by Horex GmbH in Augsburg and since 2016 by Horex Motorcycles GmbH, a subsidiary of 3C-Carbon Group AG.

== History ==
=== Development ===
==== Under Horex GmbH ====
On 15 June 2010, Horex GmbH presented the Horex VR6 at a press conference and announced that it would be producing this motorcycle from the end of 2011. The design comes from the German designer Peter Naumann. The sales price of the new Horex was given in 2010 at over 20,000 euros. On 14 January 2011, Horex GmbH announced that the new motorcycle would not be built in Bad Homburg, but in Augsburg. The company moved to Augsburg in 2012. The original plan to charge the engine with a compressor was abandoned, as was the secondary drive with toothed belts. In April 2012, the company announced the postponement of series production to the end of May 2012. On 1 June 2012, the Augsburger Allgemeine reported the start of delivery for June 2012; this date could not be met either. In Augsburg, four machines could be manufactured by four fitters per day.

At the beginning of December 2013, Horex also started engine production, which had previously been carried out in Markdorf at Weber Motor, in Augsburg on its own production line. Due to insolvency, the company's owner, Clemens Neese, filed for insolvency proceedings with the Augsburg District Court on August 28, 2014, after the expectations regarding sales had apparently not been met. The aim of the insolvency administrator was a "structured sales process" for the permanent maintenance of business operations.

==== Under Horex Motorcycles GmbH ====
Horex in Landsberg am Lech has been managed by 3C-Carbon Group AG since 2015. The VR6 was significantly revised after the takeover, the motorcycle received a completely new rear section, the engine itself, the mapping of the ECU and the exhaust system were heavily modified or improved. The chassis components are now from Öhlins, and the curb weight has been significantly reduced through the extensive use of carbon and a lithium-ion starter battery.

=== Marketing ===
At the end of July 2012, the Augsburg-based company presented the first ready-to-drive pre-series motorcycles to the trade press, and delivery of the first demonstration machines should begin in August. On the occasion of the motorcycle fair Intermot, press spokesman Arnd von de Fenn reported on the last tests at the beginning of October 2012 and announced a delivery to customers for the following months. The first sales partners were supplied with demonstration motorcycles in November 2012.

TV chef and entertainer Horst Lichter was one of the first customers to pick up his new VR6 Roadster on 20 March 2013 at the Horex factory in Augsburg.
