= Torfrock =

German Band

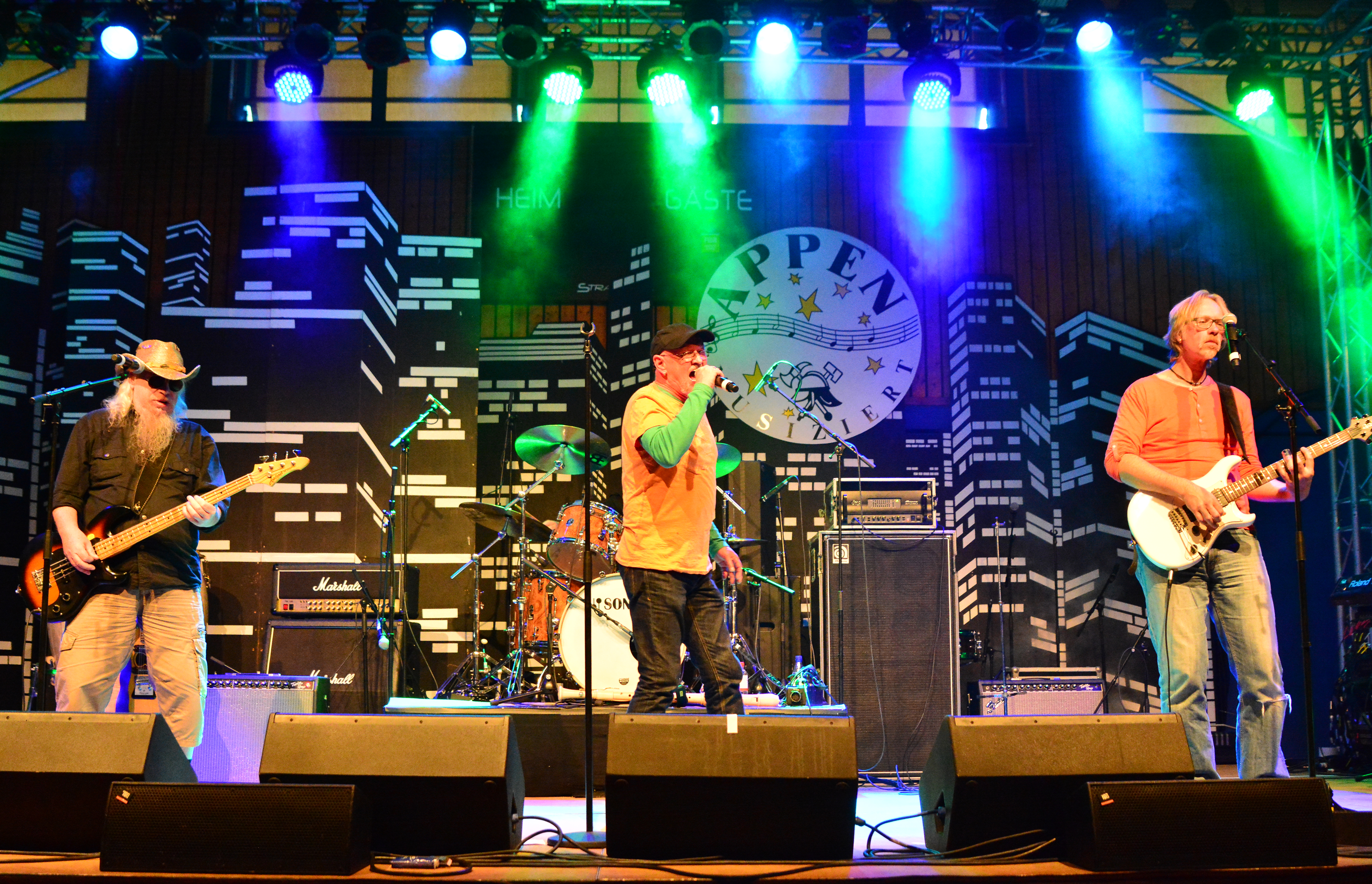
- Torfrock at Appen musiziert 2015

Background information
- Origin: Germany
- Genres: Acoustic rock, folk rock, blues rock, pop rock, hard rock
- Years active: 1976–present
- Members: Klaus Büchner; Volker Schmidt; Sven Berger; Stefan Lehmann
- Past members: Raymond Voß; Jürgen Lugge (deceased); Gunnar Kämmer; Reinhard „Howdy“ Heinrichs; Thomas Rieckmann (deceased); Ronnie Meyer; Ingo Seehase; Nick Buck; Marc-Oliver „Oliwood“ Steinwede
- Website: www.torfrock.de

Torfrock (German pronunciation: [ˈtɔʁfʁɔk], lit. "Peat Rock") is a German rock group founded by Klaus Büchner and Raymond Voß in 1977. Guitarist Jürgen Lugge from Hamburg played lead guitar until his unexpected death in 1999. With their Northern German identity, they are notable for keeping alive the native Low German language in their lyrics. With many of their songs being Low-German covers of Anglo-American standards, their music style ranges from R'n'B to blues rock and folk rock.

Their humorous to surreal song lyrics mostly deal either with 10th-century Viking Rollo (in an interpretation obviously strongly reminiscent of Dik Browne's Hägar the Horrible rather than the actual historical person) situated in Hedeby instead of Scandinavia in their songs, or life in the modern-day fictional Schleswig-Holstein rural village of Torfmoorholm (lit. "Peatbogville").

Beside being a trademark of modern-day Northern German culture, the band is closely associated with another Northern German icon, the Werner comics and movie franchise created by comic artist Rötger Feldmann (a.k.a. Brösel), not only because the band wrote the original soundtrack to the first Werner movie and partly to its sequels, but also because Torfrock singer Büchner voices character Werner in the movies. Also, Torfrock guitarist and singer Voss voices the Präsi Dieter, the choleric, yet likewise good hearted leader of a biker gang Werner is a member of. The title song Beinhart topped the charts in Germany and also entered the Top 20 in Austria and Switzerland. This was their first song to include a guitar solo from Jürgen Lugge. He was only booked as a studio musician besides Klaus Büchner (vocals), Raymond Voß (electric rhythm guitar), Uwe Meitzner (electric bass guitar) and Gunnar "Gustl" Kämmer (drums), but, in Voß' own words, the band saw it as disrespectul to go on tour, play the song and then "have nothing at all for 20 bars". So Lugge became a band member. However, he suddenly died from a stroke in 1999. The band decided not to replace him, instead Voß took over the guitar solos too (which Volker Schmidt also did when he was forced to replace Voß from 2018 onwards).

Klaus Büchner and Raymond Voß both provide vocals. Voß also is the guitarist (both six and twelve stringed) and plays banjo; Büchner - who is left handed - plays harmonica and bass flute.

2023 Voß was forced to retire due to heart problems, and bass guitarist Volker Schmidt took his place. Schmidt on the other hand was replaced by Sven Berger.

== Gallery ==
Torfrock live at Metal Frenzy 2018 in Gardelegen

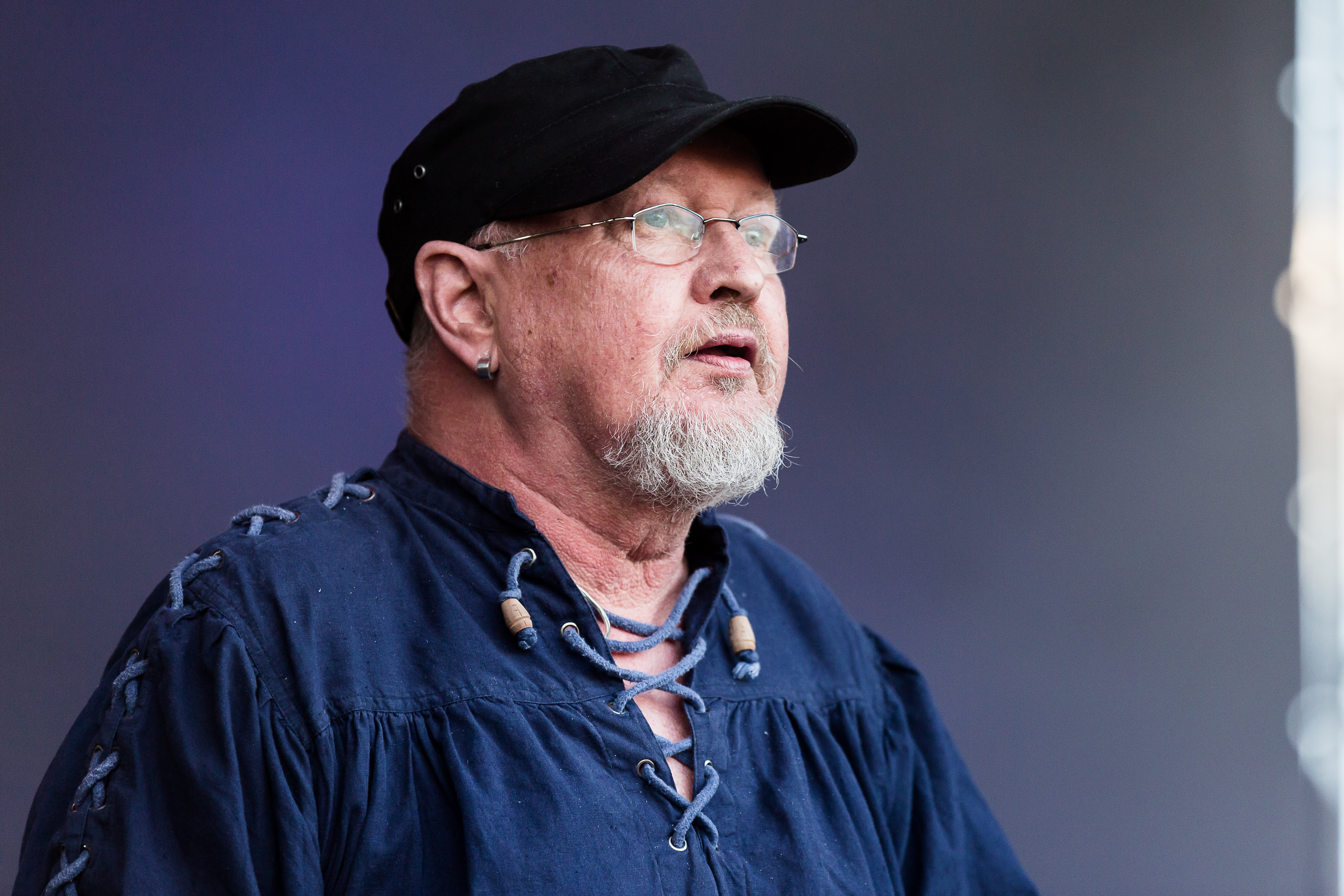
Singer Klaus Büchner

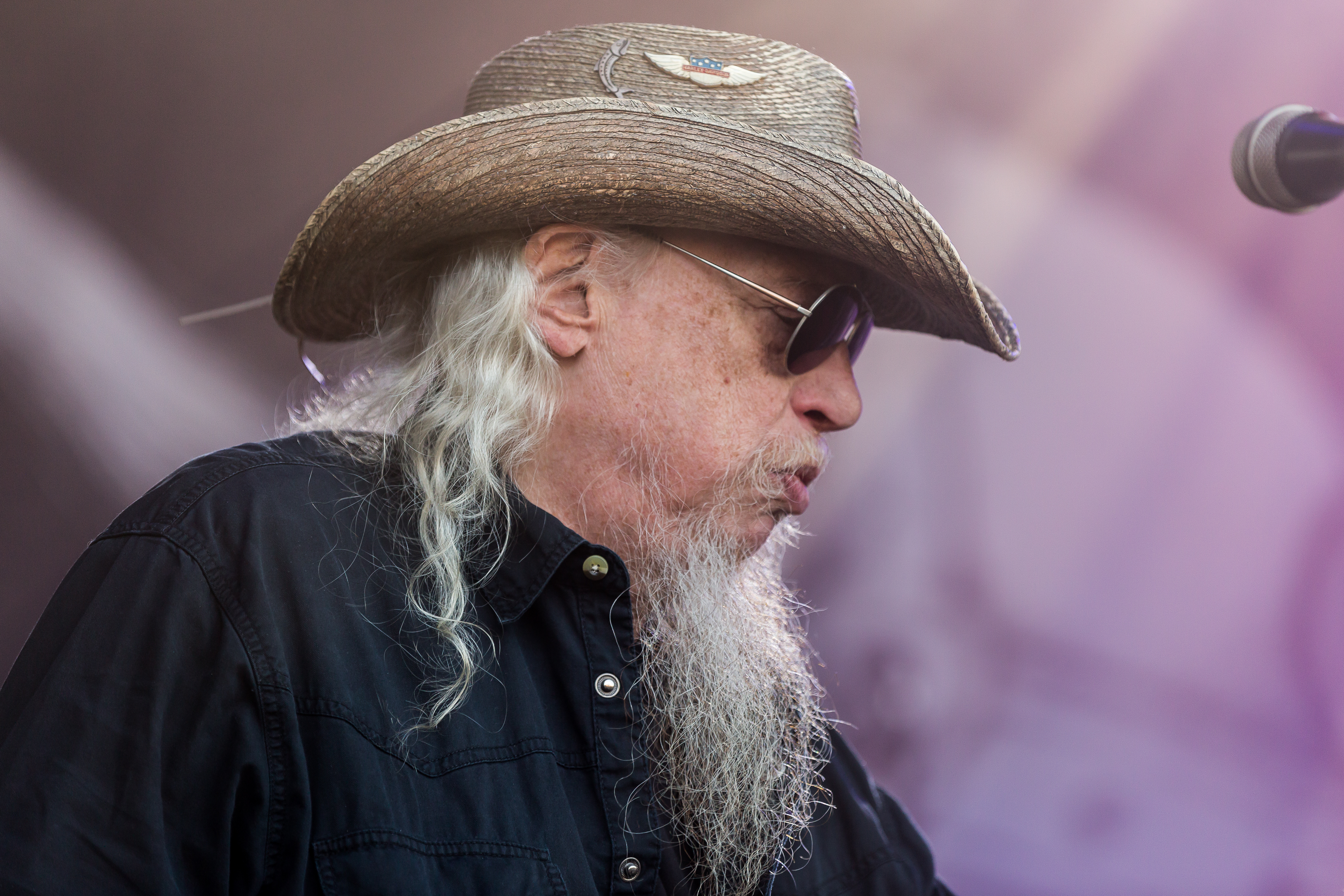
Former guitarist Raymond Voß

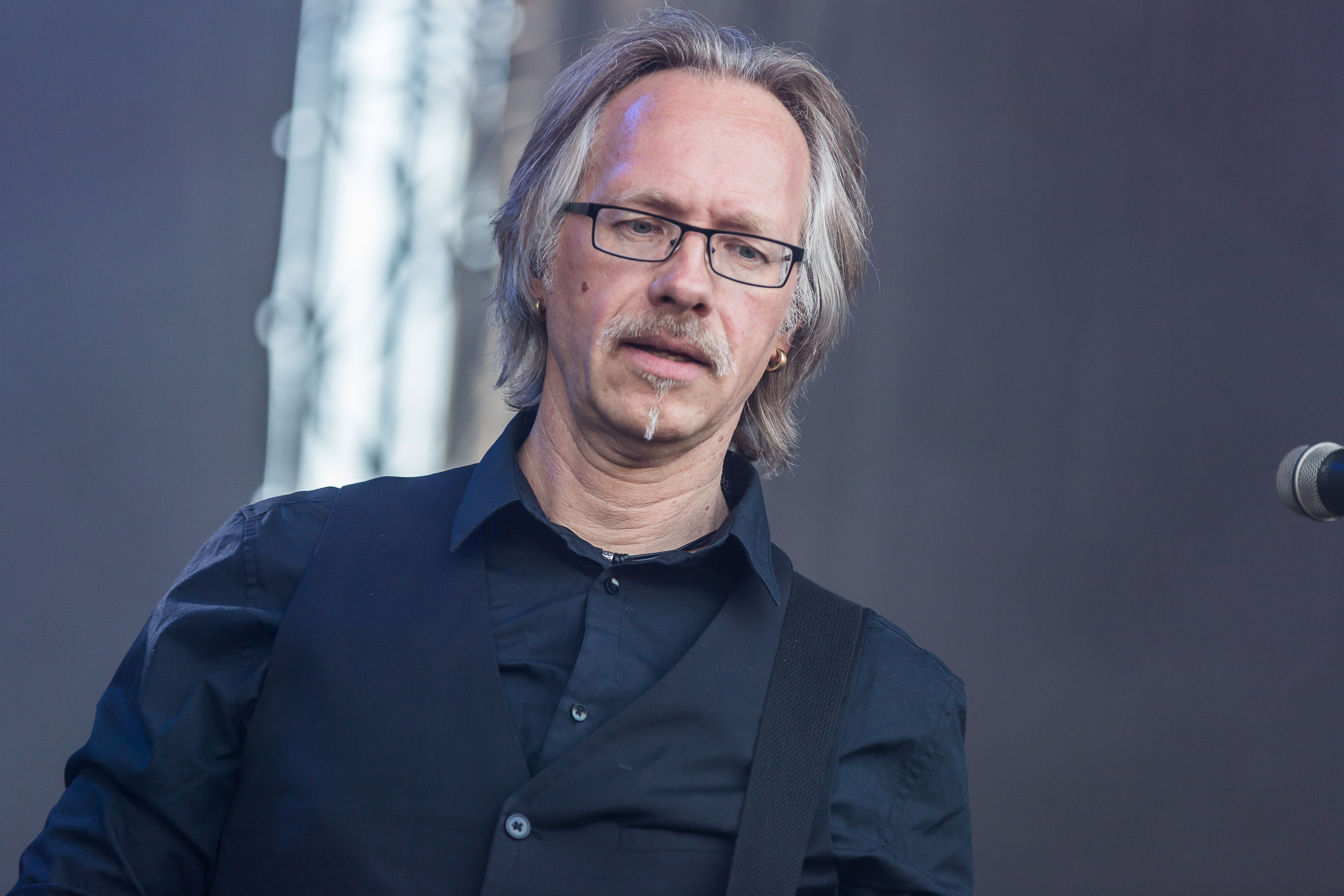
Guitarist and former bassist Volker Schmidt

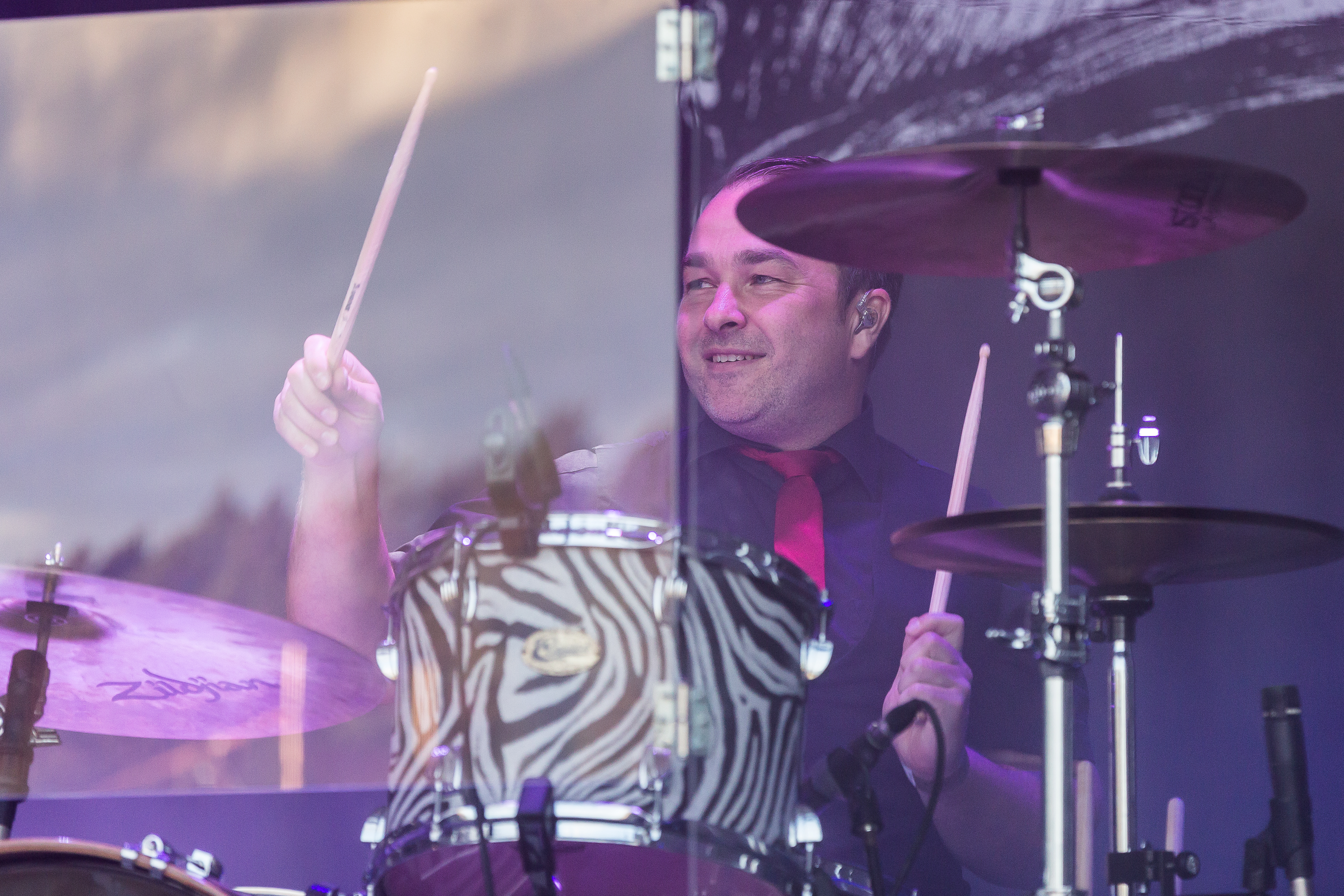
Drummer Stefan Lehmann

== Band members ==
Current members

- Klaus Büchner – lead vocals, recorder, percussion, harmonica (1977–present)
- Volker Schmidt – electric and acoustic guitars, backing vocals (2004–present), bass (2004–2018), mandolin, harmonica (2004-2018, 2022)
- Sven Berger – bass (2023–present; touring 2018-2023)
- Stefan Lehmann – drums, backing vocals (1969–present)

Former members

- Raymond Voß – lead vocals, electric and acoustic guitars, dobro, bass, banjo (1977-2023)
- Thomas Rieckmann – lead vocals, bass, acoustic guitars, concertina, bandoneon, button accordion (1977–1989; his death)
- Uwe Meitzner – bass, backing vocals (1990-1996)
- Ingo Seehase – bass, backing vocals (1996-2004)
- Jürgen Lugge – electric and acoustic guitars, mandolin, mandola, dobro, harmonica, accordion, keyboards, backing vocals (1990–1999; his death)
- Reinhard Heinrichs – harmonica, percussion, hurdy gurdy, backing vocals (1977-1995)
- Gunnar Kämmer – drums, marimba, backing vocals (1977–1996)
- Nick Buck – drums, percussion (1996–1997)
- Marc-Oliver Steinwede – drums, percussion (1997–2004)

Former touring musicians

- Pete Sage – electric and acoustic guitars, mandolin, bouzuki, fiddle, accordion, tin whistle, keyboards (1990)
- Nick Thompson – electric and acoustic guitars, mandolin, banjo, fiddle, keyboards (1997)

== Discography ==
=== Studio albums ===
- Dat matscht so schön (It splashes so nicely, 1977)
- Rata-ta-zong (1978)
- Torfrockball im Hühnerstall (Torfrock party in the chicken's barn, 1979)
- Vierter Versuch (Fourth attempt, 1980)
- Mein Gott, sind wir begabt (My god, are we talented, 1982)
- Alle an die Ruder (All hands to the oars, 1990)
- Aufe beinharte Tour (The rough way, lit. On the bone-hard tour, 1991, Live) – soundtrack for the film adaptation of the Werner comics
- Torfrock oder Watt? (Torfrock or mudflat?, pun on Torfrock oder was? [...or what?], 1991, Remix)
- Beinhart - geht das ab hier (Hard to the bone - everything is fine here, 1991)
- Die Bagaluten-Fete (The Bagalute party, 1992)
- Goiler Tonträger (Cool sound medium, 1994)
- Die Wikinger (The Vikings, 1995, Compilation)
- Rockerkuddl (1996)
- Beinhart - Alle Hits (2000, Compilation)
- Einigkeit und Blech und Freizeit (Unity and tin and spare time, a pun on the first lines of the German national anthem ["Einigkeit und Recht und Freiheit" - Unity and right and liberty] 2001)

== Videography ==
- Aufe Beinharte Tour (1992)
- Torfrock - Die Beinharte Bagaluten-Weihnacht (2002)
