= Fix and Foxi =

German comic series

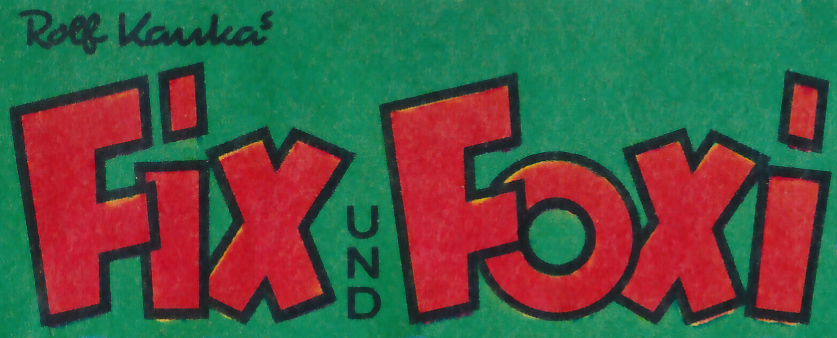
the logo was in 1967-2014

Fix und Foxi was a weekly German comics magazine created by Rolf Kauka, which ran uninterrupted from 1953 until 1994. Re-christened Fix & Foxi, it was relaunched as a monthly magazine in 2000, 2005 and 2010 respectively. Since the end of 2010, publication has once again ceased. During its heyday it was one of the most successful German comics magazines.

== History of the comic ==
In 1947, Rolf Kauka founded Kauka Publishing. In May 1953, his first comic book, Till Eulenspiegel, appeared. The characters in the comic book were loosely based on German folklore. Apart from the legendary jokester as the main character, it featured an adaptation of Baron Munchausen as well as animal characters such as Reineke Fuchs (Reynard the Fox) and Isegrim Wolf (Isengrin). In issue number 6, the fox characters Fix and Foxi first appeared in a short comic story. They soon became the favorites of the readers and from issue number 29 the comic book was retitled Fix und Foxi.

Apart from Germany, Kauka found experienced illustrators in Yugoslavia, Italy and Spain. Over the years, they created more than 80 different comic characters under his supervision (for the most important ones see list below). Kauka also published series from other countries, mainly France/Belgium, giving them their first big break in Germany and popularizing them. Fix und Foxi was published weekly in Germany with a circulation up to 400,000 per week in the magazine's heyday. Allegedly, a total of over 750 million comic books were sold internationally. Kauka's foxes also appeared in magazine spin-offs, pocket books and albums.

In 1973, Kauka sold his publishing house and Fix und Foxi was published by others, though he retained creative control. Bauer/VPM eventually became the publisher. In 1994 the comic series was retooled by the publishers into an adolescent tabloid magazine and the publication was changed from weekly to monthly. At this point, Rolf Kauka withdrew the publishing rights and stopped all publication of the series.

From 1993 to 1998, Norbert Hethke Verlag produced reprints of the first 50 comic books. From 1997 to 1999 seven comic albums of classic comics were produced by Ehapa, the erstwhile Kauka rival. In 2000, there was a short-lived revival of the comic book by Ehapa, but it was discontinued after only the third issue due to insufficient sales. In 2005, the magazine was again relaunched by Tigerpress Verlag, Hamburg, a part of the Gruner & Jahr publishing house from the Bertelsmann Group. Shortly after, Tigerpress had faced bankruptcy in 2009, the magazine was once again relaunched, this time by New Ground Publishing, which went into liquidation at the end of 2010.

In the last years of his life, Kauka began planning the Fix & Foxi TV series together with his wife, Alexandra Kauka. He also planned (in collaboration with the Ravensburger Corporation) Fix & Foxi Adventure Land in the Ravensburger Spieleland theme park. The Fix & Foxi and Friends TV series, first broadcast in Germany in February 2000, found its way into 30 countries.

Following Kauka's passing in 2000, his estate controlled the characters. German children's media company Your Family Entertainment acquired the rights to his works, including Fix & Foxi, in 2014.

== Characters ==
The two main characters of the comic are the twin fox brothers, Fix and Foxi, who live in Fuxholzen (Foxburg in the TV series). They are open-minded, agile and caring, and therefore, serve as role models for their young audience.

=== Side characters ===
- Hops (rabbit), Stops (hedgehog), and the latter's nephews Stips, Staps and Stups (hedgehogs).
- Lupinchen (wolf) - Eusebia's granddaughter, cousin to Fix, Foxi and Lupo. She's crazy about pop music, fashion, etc.
- Lupo (wolf) - a slacker who lives in a tower, and a bit of a gluttonous ne'er-do-well (particularly for Oma Eusebia's cakes) who is a true master at the art of enjoying life.
- Oma Eusebia (wolf) - an "old maid", who is also somewhat of a mother-figure for the others. Expert in baking cakes, she's also expert in keeping Lupo away from them.
- Onkel Fax (fox) - Fix and Foxi's bachelor uncle, with whom they live. The ex-Staff Sergeant (at least that's what he claims) is a passionate stamp collector who also dabbles in second-hand items.
- Professor Knox (raven) - the typical absent-minded professor and ingenious inventor.

=== Other Kauka characters ===
- Diabolino - a mischievous little devil who usually sides with the little people against ruffians, troublemakers and do-no-gooders.
- Die Pichelsteiner - a Stone Age family clan.
- Fridolin (cat), Daggi (goose) and Pieps (mouse).
- Mischa - spaceman of the future.
- Pauli (mole), Mausi (mouse), Mimi (Pauli's girlfriend). Pauli is Kauka's second most successful and durable creation. In the early days, the mole interacted with the Fix & Foxi family, but eventually got his own "universe" from 1958 onwards, when he moved back to his parents in Maulwurfshausen.
- Tom und Klein Biberherz (Tom & Small Beaver Heart) - A teenage cowboy and his little Indian companion living their adventures in the Wild West, along with Tom's elderly, grumpy and crotchety uncle Nikodemus.

== Fix & Foxi TV ==
Your Family Entertainment launched a Fix & Foxi television channel in Germany, Austria and Switzerland on December 1, 2014. In the years since, the channel has operated feeds around the world.

== See also ==
- List of magazines in Germany
