= List of number-one hits of 1991 (Germany) =

This is a list of the German Media Control Top100 Singles Chart number-ones of 1991.

Key
†	Indicates best-performing single and album of 1991

Issue date	Song	Artist	Album	Artist
7 January	"Sadeness Part I"	Enigma	"Serious Hits... Live!"	Phil Collins
14 January	"Sadeness Part I"	Enigma	"Serious Hits... Live!"	Phil Collins
21 January	"Sadeness Part I"	Enigma	"Serious Hits... Live!"	Phil Collins
28 January	"Beinhart"	Torfrock	"Serious Hits... Live!"	Phil Collins
4 February	"Beinhart"	Torfrock	"The Soul Cages"	Sting
11 February	"Beinhart"	Torfrock	"The Soul Cages"	Sting
18 February	"Beinhart"	Torfrock	"The Soul Cages"	Sting
25 February	"Beinhart"	Torfrock	"Innuendo"	Queen
4 March	"Gonna Make You Sweat"	C+C Music Factory	"Innuendo"	Queen
11 March	"Gonna Make You Sweat"	C+C Music Factory	"Innuendo"	Queen
18 March	"Gonna Make You Sweat"	C+C Music Factory	"Innuendo"	Queen
25 March	"Gonna Make You Sweat"	C+C Music Factory	"Innuendo"	Queen
1 April	"Gonna Make You Sweat"	C+C Music Factory	"Innuendo"	Queen
8 April	"Joyride"	Roxette	"Auberge"	Chris Rea
15 April	"Joyride"	Roxette	"Greatest Hits"	Eurythmics
22 April	"Joyride"	Roxette	"Joyride"	Roxette
29 April	"Joyride"	Roxette	"Joyride"	Roxette
6 May	"Joyride"	Roxette	"Joyride"	Roxette
13 May	"Joyride"	Roxette	"Joyride"	Roxette
20 May	"Joyride"	Roxette	"Joyride"	Roxette
27 May	"Joyride"	Roxette	"Joyride"	Roxette
3 June	"Wind of Change" †	Scorpions	"Joyride"	Roxette
10 June	"Wind of Change" †	Scorpions	"Joyride"	Roxette
17 June	"Wind of Change" †	Scorpions	"Joyride"	Roxette
24 June	"Wind of Change" †	Scorpions	"Joyride"	Roxette
1 July	"Wind of Change" †	Scorpions	"Joyride"	Roxette
8 July	"Wind of Change" †	Scorpions	"Joyride"	Roxette
15 July	"Wind of Change" †	Scorpions	"Joyride"	Roxette
22 July	"Wind of Change" †	Scorpions	"Crazy World" †	Scorpions
29 July	"Wind of Change" †	Scorpions	"Crazy World" †	Scorpions
5 August	"Wind of Change" †	Scorpions	"Crazy World" †	Scorpions
12 August	"Wind of Change" †	Scorpions	"Crazy World" †	Scorpions
19 August	"Bacardi Feeling (Summer Dreamin')"	Kate Yanai	"Crazy World" †	Scorpions
26 August	"Bacardi Feeling (Summer Dreamin')"	Kate Yanai	"Crazy World" †	Scorpions
2 September	"Bacardi Feeling (Summer Dreamin')"	Kate Yanai	"Crazy World" †	Scorpions
9 September	"Bacardi Feeling (Summer Dreamin')"	Kate Yanai	"Metallica"	Metallica
16 September	"Bacardi Feeling (Summer Dreamin')"	Kate Yanai	"Metallica"	Metallica
23 September	"Bacardi Feeling (Summer Dreamin')"	Kate Yanai	"On Every Street"	Dire Straits
30 September	"Bacardi Feeling (Summer Dreamin')"	Kate Yanai	"On Every Street"	Dire Straits
7 October	"Bacardi Feeling (Summer Dreamin')"	Kate Yanai	"On Every Street"	Dire Straits
14 October	"(Everything I Do) I Do It for You"	Bryan Adams	"On Every Street"	Dire Straits
21 October	"(Everything I Do) I Do It for You"	Bryan Adams	"Waking Up the Neighbours"	Bryan Adams
28 October	"(Everything I Do) I Do It for You"	Bryan Adams	"Waking Up the Neighbours"	Bryan Adams
4 November	"(Everything I Do) I Do It for You"	Bryan Adams	"Waking Up the Neighbours"	Bryan Adams
11 November	"(Everything I Do) I Do It for You"	Bryan Adams	"Waking Up the Neighbours"	Bryan Adams
18 November	"Let's Talk About Sex"	Salt-n-Pepa	"Waking Up the Neighbours"	Bryan Adams
25 November	"Let's Talk About Sex"	Salt-n-Pepa	"We Can't Dance"	Genesis
2 December	"Let's Talk About Sex"	Salt-n-Pepa	"We Can't Dance"	Genesis
9 December	"Let's Talk About Sex"	Salt-n-Pepa	"We Can't Dance"	Genesis
16 December	"Let's Talk About Sex"	Salt-n-Pepa	"We Can't Dance"	Genesis
23 December	"Let's Talk About Sex"	Salt-n-Pepa	"We Can't Dance"	Genesis
30 December	No release (Note: Same issue as for 23 December.)			

== See also ==
- List of number-one hits (Germany)
