= Lurchi =

Comic character

Lurchi is the advertising comic character of the German Salamander shoe factories. He is a fire salamander. His adventures are told (in German) in small booklets titled Lurchis Abenteuer (Lurchi's adventures). They are targeted mainly at primary schoolers, written in calligraphic handwriting in simple rhyming couplets.

== History ==
While Salamander issued some newspaper advertisements featuring an anonymous anthropomorphic salamander in early 20th century, the character Lurchi was introduced in 1937. The name of the artist of the pre-war booklets is lost.
In the 1930s, Salamander did not even produce children's shoes. The booklets were rather meant to keep youngsters quiet while parents would buy shoes.
Lurchi's adventures ceased publication in 1939 due to the outbreak of World War II. They were continued only in 1951, starting with redrawn remakes of the prewar issues 1–5. Then, artist Heinz Schubel and writer Erwin Kühlewein took over, and shaped the style of Lurchi as it became known by generations of readers. Schubel retired in 1972, and various artists tried to keep up his standards - unsuccessfully, in the opinion of the majority of fans. In 1995 Dietwald Doblies took over and returned to a more "Schubelian" style.
In 2000, all protagonists of the series underwent a major "brushup" at the request of the company's management. Most remarkably, they became fully clothed, whereas in their classic form they had been mostly nude except for some accessories, and, of course, their Salamander shoes. It should be mentioned, however, that the "mammal" protagonists (the mouse, the hedgehog and the dwarf) always had worn at least pants, and the amphibian protagonists of course had no visible reproductive organs. But more essential to the series was the change of roles the protagonists went through (e. g. Piping had been the group's elder before, since 2000 he is a child). Moreover, the text is in prose now. The original format of thin green booklets (Hefte) was temporarily replaced by a square format and a redesigned marketing approach. However, the modernized design was poorly received by collectors and long-time readers, prompting a return around 2005 to a format and visual style closer to the classic editions. In 2011, issue #147 (Lurchi und die Fee Emily) introduced Emily the fairy as a permanent character—the first addition to the core group (Hopps the frog, Piping the dwarf, Mäusepiep the mouse, Igelmann the hedgehog, and Unkerich the toad) in several decades. She is the only member of the group capable of flight. The booklets continue to be produced in limited editions as promotional items, with Jan Reiser serving as the illustrator since 2022.

== Characters ==
- Hopps the frog, clearly Lurchi's best buddy, ever curious, cheeky and adventurous.
- Piping the dwarf, the elder of the group, cautious and conservative, but also a tinkerer.
- Mäusepiep the mouse, fearful and sometimes clumsy.
- Igelmann the hedgehog, homelike and relaxed. He's the only character whose sp Iecies plays a role in the stories every now and then, due to his spikes.
- Unkerich, the Yellow-bellied toad, generally the "strong man" of the group, he also loves eating and is sometimes shown a bit clumsy.
- Emily the fairy, magical, cheerful, and helpful, joining the group's adventures starting in late 2011 (officially introduced in issue #147, Lurchi und die Fee Emily).
- Sometimes also Trine, Lurchi's sister (and naturally also a salamander) appeared.

Lurchi has met these friends during issues #1 to 5.

== Adventures ==
In the first issues (~1-3) Lurchi was still basically a salamander, very "humanized" in form, but in its natural size and confronted with nature life dangers such as predators (stork, hedgehog, owl) etc. In these issues he is also clearly an adolescent, living with his parents, whereas in later stories he acts independently and is practically "ageless". Soon Lurchi's world developed into a fictional pseudo-human society of small creatures (animals and dwarfs) who had cars and other technology fitting their size, but still lived in mushroom and trees trunk houses (~issues 4–10, and once again in issue 22 "The Olympiad"). In the "classic" era, Lurchi and his friends were anthropomorphic animals only slightly smaller than humans, and travelled the human world.
Many adventures include exotic places, fairytales and sporting competitions. In the 1973-95 period, "political correct" subjects were preferred, mainly environment related.

The adventures always have a happy ending, thanks to the (sometimes unconventional) use of Salamander shoes. They always end with the rhyme:
"Im … tönts lange noch
Salamander lebe hoch!"
"In … it's heard long after
Long live Salamander!",
where XXX is the name of the current adventure's scene.

== Other media ==
Some audio plays have been produced: at least five episodes on Flexi disc in the 1960s, at least three on vinyl single disc around 1970, six on Compact Cassette in the early 1990s, and a running series on CD since 2000.
Very popular were the toy figures: Lurchi as an articulated figure (rubber with intern metal wire), the six friends as rubber figurines (with squeaking valve), and the six friends as large (around 1 ft) articulated plastic figures. There have been some smaller and less popular series of figures. After 2000, the classic figure series were discontinued and replaced by hard plastic figures of the "new" characters.
There are many other (but mostly short-lived) merchandising articles, including colouring books, plush toys, stickers, postcards, jumping jack Lurchi, and, in the shoe shops, rockinghorses and small merry-go-rounds.

== Sources and external links ==
- Fansite, very detailed information (in German)
- Lurchi's adventures (official site of Salamander company) (in German) (some parts translated in English and other languages)
