= Hansrudi Wäscher =

Swiss-German comics artist and comics author

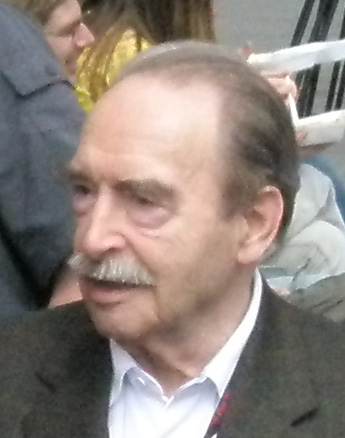
Hansrudi Wäscher in Erlangen (2008)

Hansrudi Wäscher (5 April 1928, in St. Gallen, Switzerland – 7 January 2016, in Freiburg im Breisgau) was a Swiss-German comics artist and comics author.

== Life ==
=== Background and education ===
Wäscher was the son of a German father and a Swiss mother, who through marriage also attained German citizenship. Wäscher spent the early years of his life in German-speaking parts of Switzerland. Then he moved to Lugano, where he first came into contact with Comics. After moving to Hannover in 1940 and completing the German high-school diploma of Mittlere Reife he began training as a poster artist, and then studied advertising art for seven semesters at the Werkkunstschule Hannover. During this time he completed a transportation manual for the city of Hannover called "Der Herr Boll."

=== Sigurd, Akim, Nick, Tibor, Falk ===
During the 1950s, Wäscher worked for the Walter Lehning Verlag publishing house and created some of his best-known comics there: Sigurd, Nick, Tibor, Falk and countless others that appeared in the Piccolo-format (thin booklets in landscape format) and with circulation numbers sometimes reaching the millions. He also continued the Akim series into its 40th issue after the Italian artist Augusto Pedrazza had produced the first 28 issues. The Sigurd series was published until 1960 with a total of 324 books and after 1958 received a reprint in 124 booklets in large format. Later "Sigurd" also appeared as a radio drama in Germany. The earliest issues of "Sigurd" have been auctioned for as much as 3,000 Euro. Other Wäscher comics also reach high prices in auction. In 2011 the "Sigurd" Piccolo booklets were released as an iPhone-App in Germany.

=== Titanus, Gert ===
In 1955, "Titanus-Verlag" publishing house released two Wäscher booklets in its Science-Fiction series "Titanus." During the same time, Lehning Verlag publishing house also published the "Gert" series which ended after 24 issues. From 1956 to 1959 Wäscher continued to work on the Akim series with "Akim – Neue Abenteuer" (Akim – New Adventures), bringing the total issue-count to 197 although issue 197, which ended the series, was released by the Norbert Hethke-Verlag publishing house only 25 years nach after issue 196 was completed. After the Akim, which had clear references to Tarzan, Wäscher continued drawing through the 1960s with the jungle adventure "Tibor" which reached 187 Piccolo issues, and was later rereleased in large format. At the same time Wäscher was working on a new knight epic "Falk", which reached 164 issues until 1963.

=== Roy Stark ===
In 1967, Wäscher began a new series for the Lehning-Verlag publishing house with the title "Roy Stark", which reached 18 large format volumes. Shortly before the publishing house closed down, the "Falk" series began a new storyline that was nonetheless cancelled after 17 issues . For the Hethke-Verlag Wäscher continued the series to its end an in 1988 Piccolo booklets Nr. 1-17 were reissued in album-format. In the third album the newly drawn ending of the series appeared.

=== After the 1980s ===
From the mid 1980s Wäscher, dubbed by his German fans ″Der Meister″ (The Master), worked almost exclusively for the Norbert Hethke Verlag publishing house, which focused on releasing nostalgic comic series. From Norbert Hethke, almost all of Wäschers works were rereleased in diverse formats. Wäscher drew new covers for many of the books, as well as for ″Sprechblase" the magazine of the Hethke publishing house. "Sprechblase" was also a platform for Wäscher to continue some of his older stories. Nonetheless, the magazine did feature new heroes such as Fenrir. The series were continued until the death of Norbert Hethkes in 2007, which resulted in the closure of the publishing firm. The most popular series of Sigurd, Nick, Falk and Tibor have been continued by other publishers since the closure of Hethke's publishing house.

In 1993, Wäscher was named the most productive German comic author by Guinness World Records. In 2008, at the Comic-Salon in Erlangen, he received the Max and Moritz Prize for his pioneering achievements in German comics history. In 2009 at the Munich Comicfestival he received the 'PENG! prize for lifetime achievement.

On 7 January 2016, Hansrudi Wäscher died at the age of 87 in Freiburg im Breisgau.

== Awards ==
- Deutscher Fantasy-Preis in 1999 for his comics achievements during the post-war period.
- Hansrudi Wäscher received the 2008 Max and Moritz Prize, the most important prize for comics artists at the International Comic-Salon in Erlangen.
- At the 2009 Comic Festival in München a comic anthology entitled Hommage to Hansrudi Wäscher – Pioneer of Comics was released with the cooperation of 42 German comics artists. Wäscher was concurrently awarded the ″PENG!″ comic prize for his lifetime achievements.

== Selected works ==
- Sigurd – Nr. 1–324, in Piccolo-Format, b/w with color title page, starting 1953 with Lehning-Verlag
- Gert – Nr. 1–24, in Kolibri format, later released by Hethkeals as softcover albums 1–4
- Akim – Herr des Dschungels, 1–3 (Piccolo), Abenteuer der Weltgeschichte (Nr. 27, 31, 32), starting 1955
- Akim – neue Abenteuer Nr. 1–196, in Piccolo format, b/w with color cover, starting 1956
- Nick der Weltraumfahrer – Nr. 1–139, in Piccolo format, b/w with color cover, two Sigurd stories and one Akim in Harry – die bunte Jugendzeitung, starting 1958
- Nick – der Weltraumfahrer, Nr. 1–121 (large format, color), starting 1959
- Tibor – Nr. 1–187, in Piccolo format, b/w with color cover, starting 1959
- Falk – Ritter ohne Furcht und Tadel – Nr. 1–164, in Piccolo format, b/w with color cover, starting 1960
- Nizar – der Tiger Boy – Nr. 1–25 (large format in color), starting 1962
- Sigurd – Neue Abenteuer, Nr. 125–257 (large format in color), starting 1963
- Bob und Ben – in Piccolo format b/w, Nr. 1–9, 1–14, starting 1963
- Piccolo-Großband – 3 in 1, Nr. 1–90 with Tibor 1–90, new stories with Kit and reprints from Nick (Piccolo 1–90), Sigurd (large format with novel and pictures by Wäscher), starting 1964
- Tibor- special edition (large format with picture stories and novel), Bild Abenteuer, Nr. 1–50 (large format in color), reprint in Piccolo (not all are by Wäscher), starting 1965
- Falk – Nr. 86–119 (large format in color). Large format Nr. 1–85 are reprints of the Piccolos Nr. 1–164, Nick-Sonderband, starting 1966
- Roy Stark, Nr. 1–18 (large format in color), starting 1967
- Ulf – Der edle Ritter, Nr. 1–3 (color large format), Nizar, Nr. 1–3 (coloar large format), 1968 with Kölling Verlag
- Lasso – as color large format with Bastei-Verlag
- Buffalo Bill – as color large format with Bastei-Verlag (later with Hethke as softcover 1–10 and as hardcover 1–10

== Literature ==
- Detlef Lorenz: Hansrudi Wäscher, Phänomen seiner Zeit. Heider-Verlag, Bergisch Gladbach 2008, ISBN 978-3-87314-432-3
- Andreas C. Knigge: Allmächtiger! Hansrudi Wäscher. Pionier der deutschen Comics. Edition Comics etc., Hamburg 2011, ISBN 978-3-941694-11-8.
