= Mecki =

Fictional character

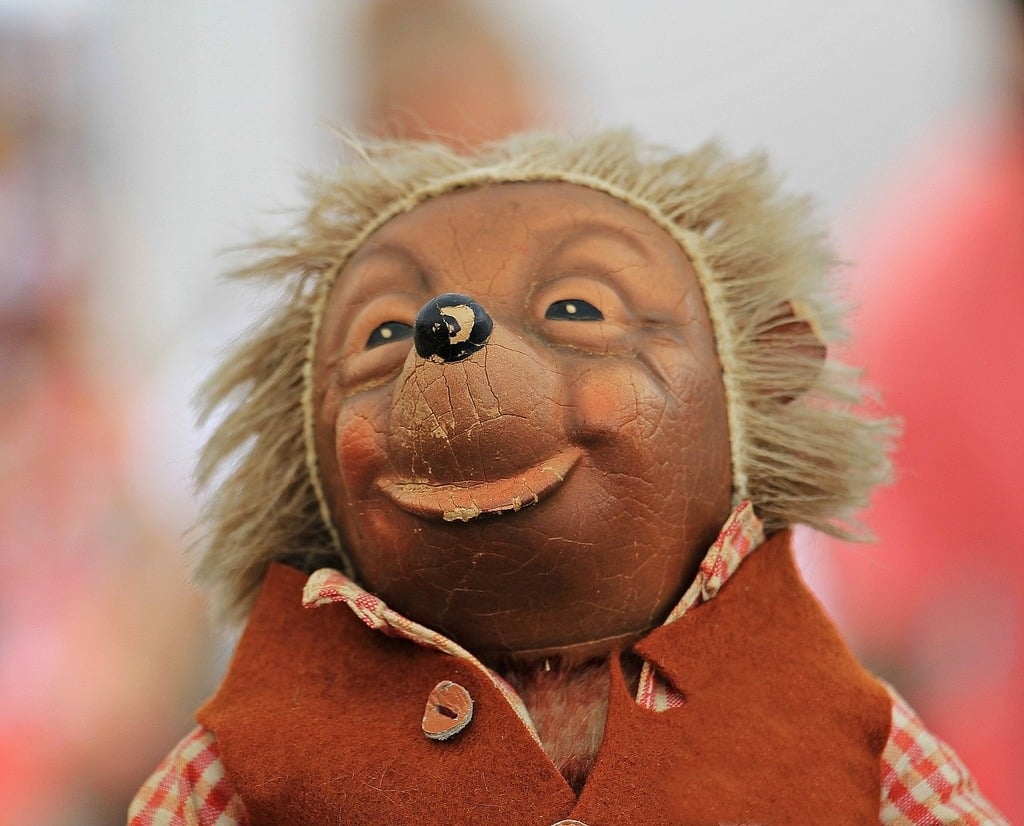
An example of a Mecki hedgehog toy

Mecki is a fictional character who originally came from a puppet film by the Diehl Brothers, and later became the mascot of the magazine Hörzu where it is featured in its own comic. The anthropomorphic hedgehog owes its name to the former editor-in-chief of Hörzu, Eduard Rhein. The character is as instantly recognizable in Germany as Mickey Mouse.

== Characteristics ==
Mecki wears blue trousers with patches on the knees, a red and white gingham shirt, a brown waistcoat, and a string belt. He is married to Micki and they have two children Macki and Mucki. The comic features other characters, such as the sleepy monkey Schrat and the temperamental penguin Charly.

== History ==
In 1938, a character resembling Mecki first appeared in the cartoon "The Race between the Hare and the Hedgehog" by the three Diehl brothers, based on the Grimm Brothers fairy tale "The Hare and the Hedgehog".

In 1949, the magazine Hörzu was first published. When Eduard Rhein, the editor-in-chief of the publication, was preparing the new editorial offices, he discovered a badly damaged home-made stick puppet of a hedgehog in a box. Since the new publication had no mascot, the hedgehog was chosen. In 1949, the illustrator Reinhold Escher designed the character and it was given the name Mecki, a play on the German word for complaining. It first appeared on the October 1949 issue.

Initially, Mecki appeared on the letter to the editor or the joke page. From 1951, the character appeared in irregular intervals in whole page stories. In 1953, Mecki started to appear each week in episodic adventure stories taking place in exotic locations, places from the past and from fiction. From the regular appearances in Horzu, Mecki became popular. It soon was featured on many commercial products including kites, pillows, matchboxes, and stationery. Steiff started a line of Mecki toys, Hundreds of different postcards featured Mecki, as well as many picture books and animated cartoons. Mecki appeared in commercials encouraging participation in the Bundestag election. Between 1952 and 1964, a Mecki picture book was published every year just in time for Christmas by the publisher Hammerich & Lesser, which belonged to the Springer Group.

In 1956, a person in a Mecki costume traveled by helicopter to more than 100 cities in southern Germany as part of a publicity tour. Children assembled in sports fields and other clearings to await the character. They received dolls, picture books, and other gifts.

In 1985, Volker Reiche, who would go on to draw the FAZ strip "Strizz", started drawing the Mecki comic strip. He drew the strip until 1999, after which a number of artists drew the comic, including Harald Siepermann and Witteck. In 2002, Reiche returned to drawing Mecki, modernizing the comic a design of the characters. In 2006, Hansi Kiefersauer started drawing the Mecki comic strip, developing the stories with his wife Lilli Herschhorn.

A hairstyle resembling Mecki's was later named after the character.
