= Atze =

Comic and youth magazine in East Germany (1955–1991)

- Categories: Comic magazine; Youth magazine
- Frequency: Monthly
- Circulation: 450,000
- Publisher: Junge-Welt-Verlag
- Founded: 1955
- First issue: April 1955
- Final issue Number: 1991; 442
- Company: Freie Deutsche Jugend
- Country: East Germany
- Based in: East Berlin; Dresden
- Language: German
- ISSN: 0323-8903
- OCLC: 85150277

Atze (German: Pal) was a monthly comics magazine which was published from 1955 to 1991 in East Germany. It was the first comic publication in the country and was one of the state-controlled publications targeting youth.

== History and profile ==
Atze was established in 1955 as a sister publication of another magazine named Der Junge Pionier (German: The Young Scout), and its first issue appeared in April that year. Both magazines were edited by the same editorial team led by Klaus Hilbig for one year. Then Atze became part of the Freie Deutsche Jugend (German: Central Council of the Free German Youth) which was a youth movement controlled by the state until 1990. The publisher of the magazine was the Junge-Welt-Verlag, publishing company of the Freie Deutsche Jugend. Atze came out monthly and was first headquartered in Berlin and then in Dresden.

In the first year Atze was an eight-page publication. The magazine was redesigned in 1957, and its page number was extended to twelve. From 1962 its page number was sixteen.

Atze began to feature the comic series Fix and Fax by Jürgen Kieser in 1958. It also featured Pats Reiseabenteuer (German: Pat's Travel Adventures) which was started in 1967. One of its editors-in-chief was Wolfgang Altenburger who held the post from 1963 who had been a contributor of Atze. He introduced a new outline for the magazine. It included political editorials and comic series Pats Reiseabenteuer and Fix and Fax. This outline was employed without any significant change until the closure of Atze in 1991 due to its lower market share.

Wolfgang Altenburger did not only introduce an outline for Atze, but also made the magazine much more political in 1967 through anti-western, nationalist and socialist content in order to encourage socialist ideology among East German youth.

During its lifetime Atze produced a total of 442 issues and featured 1,686 comic stories. The magazine had a constant circulation of 450,000 copies.
