= Mike, der Taschengeldexperte =

Magazine

Mike, der Taschengeldexperte (German for "Mike, the allowance expert") was a German promotional comic series, which was published every two months from 1978 to 2007. The comic was distributed free of charge by credit union banks, along with the comics Sumsi and Marc & Penny, to attract young prospective customers for the bank. The comic ran for 175 issues over 29 years.

Since July 2007, the comic has been followed by a sequel called Primax, where Mike and his girlfriend Tina have new adventures along with figures from the comic Marc & Penny.

Mike was created by the German comics artists Mali Beinhorn and Werner Büsch from the Büsch-Beinhorn studio from Emsdetten. Other contributors to the comic included Jan Gulbransson, Gabriel Nemeth, Hansi Kiefersauer and Ralph Ruthe.

The comic was last produced by the advertising agency genokom from Münster in Westphalia, which also publishes the sequel comic Primax together with the DG VERLAG.

The comic was also translated into Finnish as Hakki Hamsteri ("Hakki the hamster") and distributed free of charge by the Finnish bank Kansallis-Osake-Pankki from 1984 to 1995.

== Contents ==
The comic takes place in the fictional German town of Sülzberg. Mike Hamsterbacke (eng. "Hamstercheek") lives here together with his father Alfred in a small house. His best friends are Birne, a living light bulb from China and the academic Dr. Karl Höhn, a mixture between a mouse and a bird. Since issue 02/1989 Mike also has a girlfriend called Tina, whom he met in a sausage factory owned by Gottlieb Grunz, where she was working as the company nurse.

Since issue 05/1982, Mike has had an enemy called Gierschlund Wolf, a notorious villain and thief, who has dedicated his entire life to Mike's downfall. However, his own incompetence and overconfidence always foil his plans.

A typical Mike story often begins my Mike's father looking for an assistant job in the town newspaper ("Sülzberger Bote") for his son, so that he can "improve his allowance". Mike starts on this job with such euphoria so that in the end, something goes horribly wrong and Mike is fired from his new job.

Since issue 11/1986, the concept was changed, with many Mike stories being adventures, where Mike travels throughout the world with Dr. Karl Höhn.

Since issue 04/1997, around half of the contents consist of reprints of older stories (from 1986 onwards). The comic was cancelled in issue 03/2007.

== Mike and the secret of the dwarf forest ==
The longest story ever to be published is the multi-part story Mike und das Geheimnis des Zwergenwaldes ("Mike and the secret of the dwarf forest"). It was published from issue 05/1979 to issue 03/1982 and consisted of 18 episodes over 130 pages.

The story consists of a camping trip that Mike, Dr. Karl Höhn and Birne go on together, into the idyllic dwarf forest. When they arrive at the camping site, Karl goes to fetch firewood, falls down into a hole and is rescued by friendly Waldläufer Wurzelwarz. Mike and Birne go to search for Dr. Höhn and also fall down the same hole. Thus begins a genuine fantasy epic with dwarfs, dragons, elves, a fabulous golden key and an evil sorcerer called Feuerbart and his demonic troops.
