= Horex =

German motorcycle manufacturer

Horex / HOREX GmbH
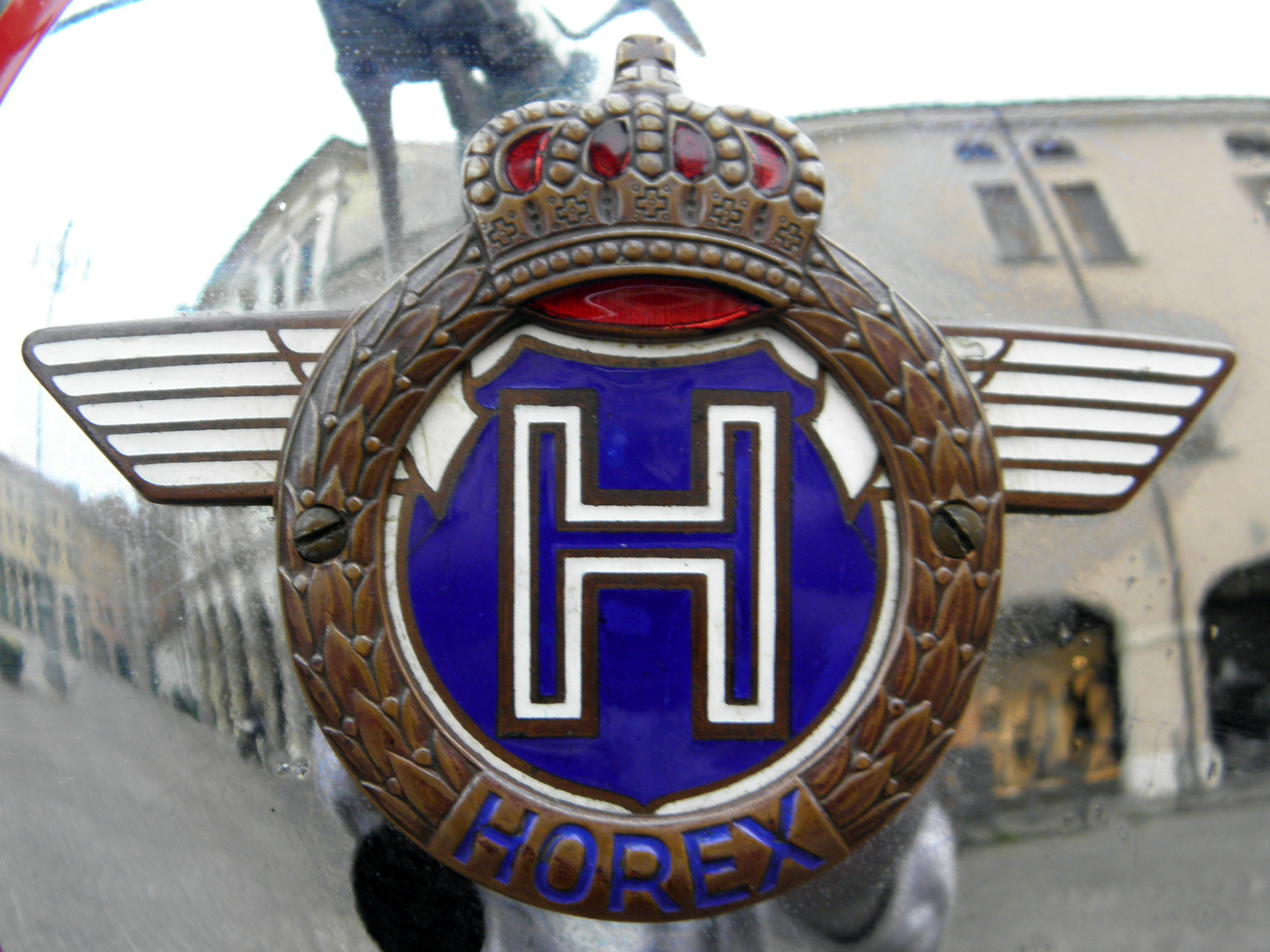
- Founded: 1923; 103 years ago 2010; 16 years ago, relaunched
- Headquarters: Augsburg, Germany
- Products: motorcycles, proprietary engines
- Parent: 3C-Carbon Composite Company GmbH
- Website: http://www.horex.com/

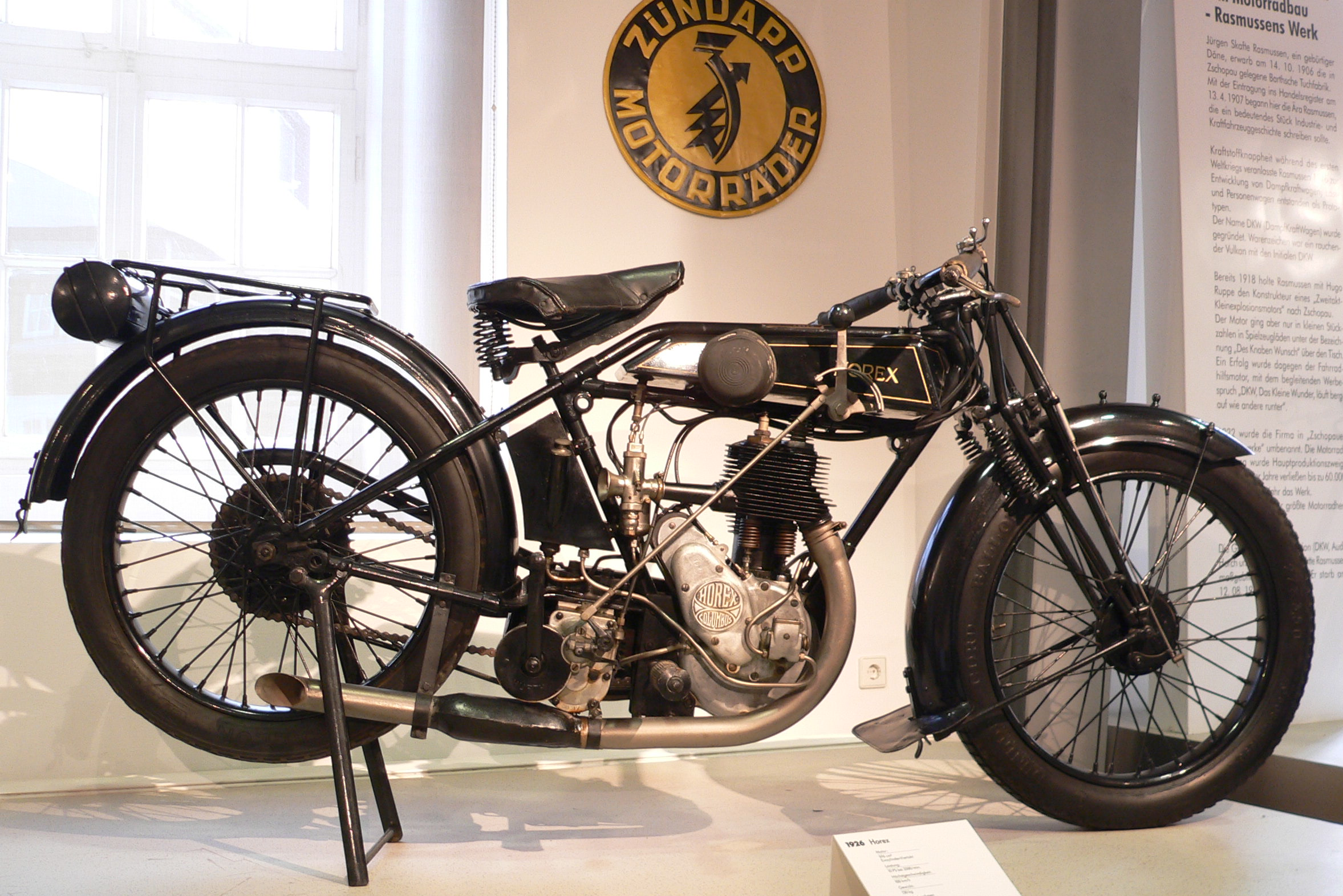
1926 Horex in the Deutsches Zweirad- und NSU-Museum Neckarsulm

Horex is a German motorcycle manufacturer. It was founded in 1923 by Fritz Kleemann in Bad Homburg vor der Höhe in Hesse. From 1935 to the mid-1950s, the company operated as Horex-Columbus-Werk K.G., then as Horex-Werke KG.

The brand name Horex originated from Homburg, supplemented by the Rex trademark of the parents Rex canning glass company Bad Homburg. In 1960, Daimler-Benz AG took over the Horex works and dissolved them. Since 2010, the newly founded Horex GmbH in Augsburg owned the trademark rights and built motorcycles under the old name. In August 2014, owner Clemens Neese filed for bankruptcy. 3C-Carbon Composite Company GmbH took over the Horex brand in January 2015.

== History ==
In 1920 Friedrich Kleemann (1868–1949), financial manager at the Rex Konservenglas Gesellschaft (preservative jar manufacturing company) in Bad Homburg (Germany) bought Columbus Motorenbau AG, a small motor factory in Oberursel by Taunus, which was in the neighbourhood. The factory made the later Horex model and the name remained the same for almost 30 years. Fritz Kleemann, the son of Friedrich Kleemann, made the first cycles with a GNOM engine, delivered from the Columbus-Engine factory.

In 1923 Fritz Kleemann (1901–75), founded Horex-Fahrzeugbau AG. He derived the name from his town HOmburg and his father's preservative jar company Rex. He was also a motorcycle racer and was riding his own Horex machine. He built the first "real" Horex, a 248cc, OHV, which he himself tested in racing. So, Horex was built for motorcycle riders by motorcycle riders.

Horex built motorcycles with Columbus four-stroke engines from Motorenfabrik Oberursel. In 1925 Horex and Columbus merged. Horex developed a range of models with single-cylinder Columbus engines from 250 cc to 600 cc. In 1933 it added two parallel-twin models: the 600 cc S6 and 800 cc S8. Both twins have chain-driven OHC valvegear.

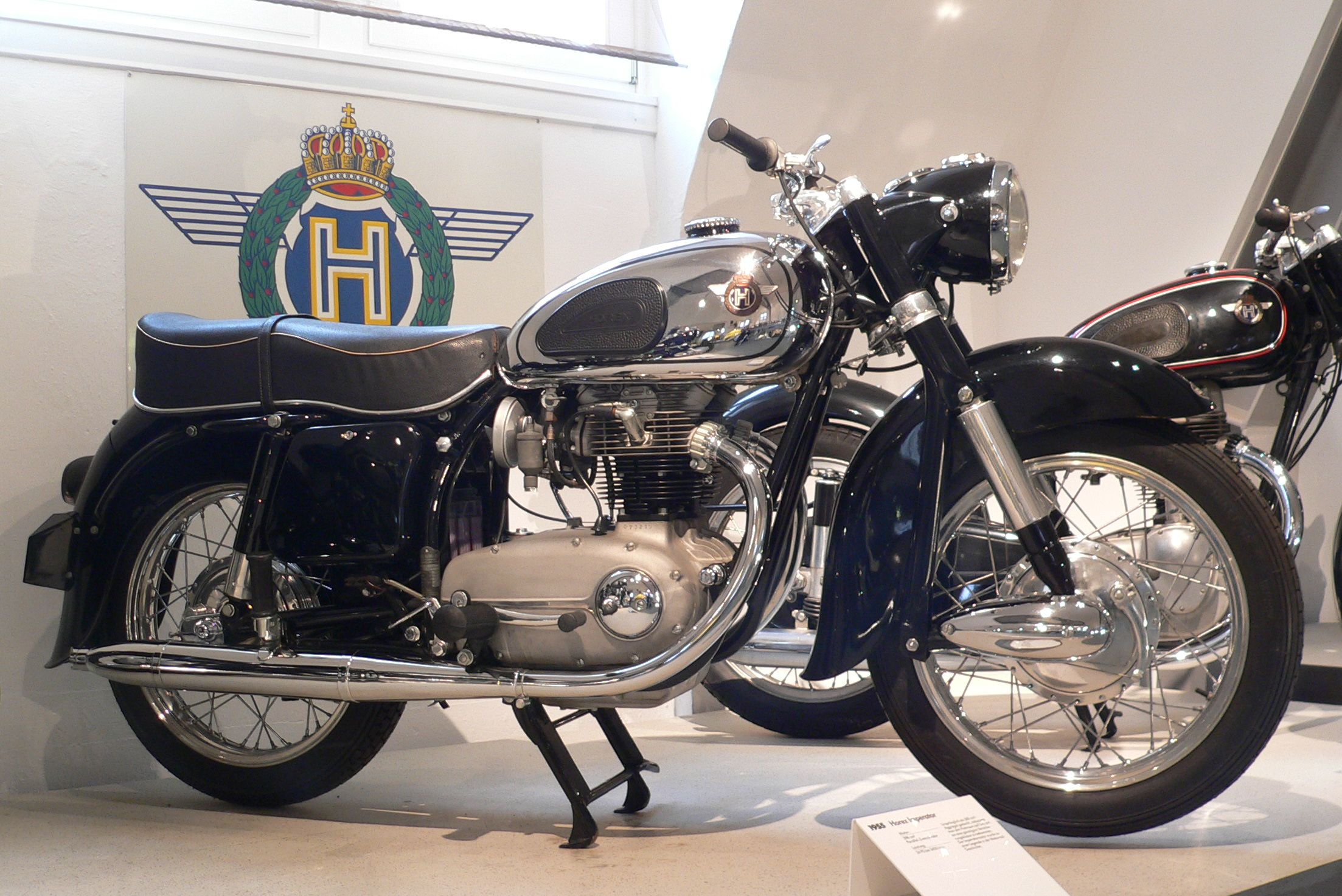
1955 Horex Imperator in the Deutsches Zweirad- und NSU-Museum Neckarsulm

World War II interrupted motorcycle production, but Horex resumed in 1948 with a 350 cc single-cylinder model, the SB 35 Regina. In 1951, Horex added a 500 cc OHC parallel-twin engine called the Imperator. In 1954 it added a 400 cc version of this twin to its range. In 1955, the company replaced the Regina with the Resident. Horex motorcycles were rarely exported and only a few are surviving outside Germany. 2855 Regina s and 2420 Imperator s were produced between 1948 and 1955.

Daimler-Benz which had a close association with Horex since 1948 took over the company in 1960 and motorcycle production was terminated. Friedl Münch, famous for his Mammut series of car-engined roadsters, purchased the rights to the brand in 1977, and built a massive 1400cc roadster dubbed the Horex 1400 TI in 1978. In 1989 CK Design in Japan developed the Horex 644 OSCA with Fritz Roeth in Hammelbach. The 644cc single cylinder Honda RFVC engine made its debut in Berlin in 1990 .

On 15 June 2010, it was announced that the brand would be revived and that a Horex motorcycle with a narrow-angle, six-cylinder supercharged engine would be available for sale in Germany, Austria, and Switzerland at the end of 2011, with international sales to follow. Besides the new VR6 supercharged engine, an aluminum bridge frame with a steel steering head forms the chassis. A single swing arm controls the rear wheel, while the engine power is transferred by a belt drive system.

The company filed for bankruptcy in September 2014, and in late 2014 announced that all employees had been let go and the factory was closed.

3C-Carbon Group AG is going to be the new owner of motorcycle brand Horex. Under the direction of the insolvency administrator, Rainer U. Müller from the law firm Anchor Rechtsanwälte, the 3C-Carbon Group AG came out on top in the quest to purchase Horex on 6 February 2015.
