= Rötger Feldmann =

German comic artist (born 1950)

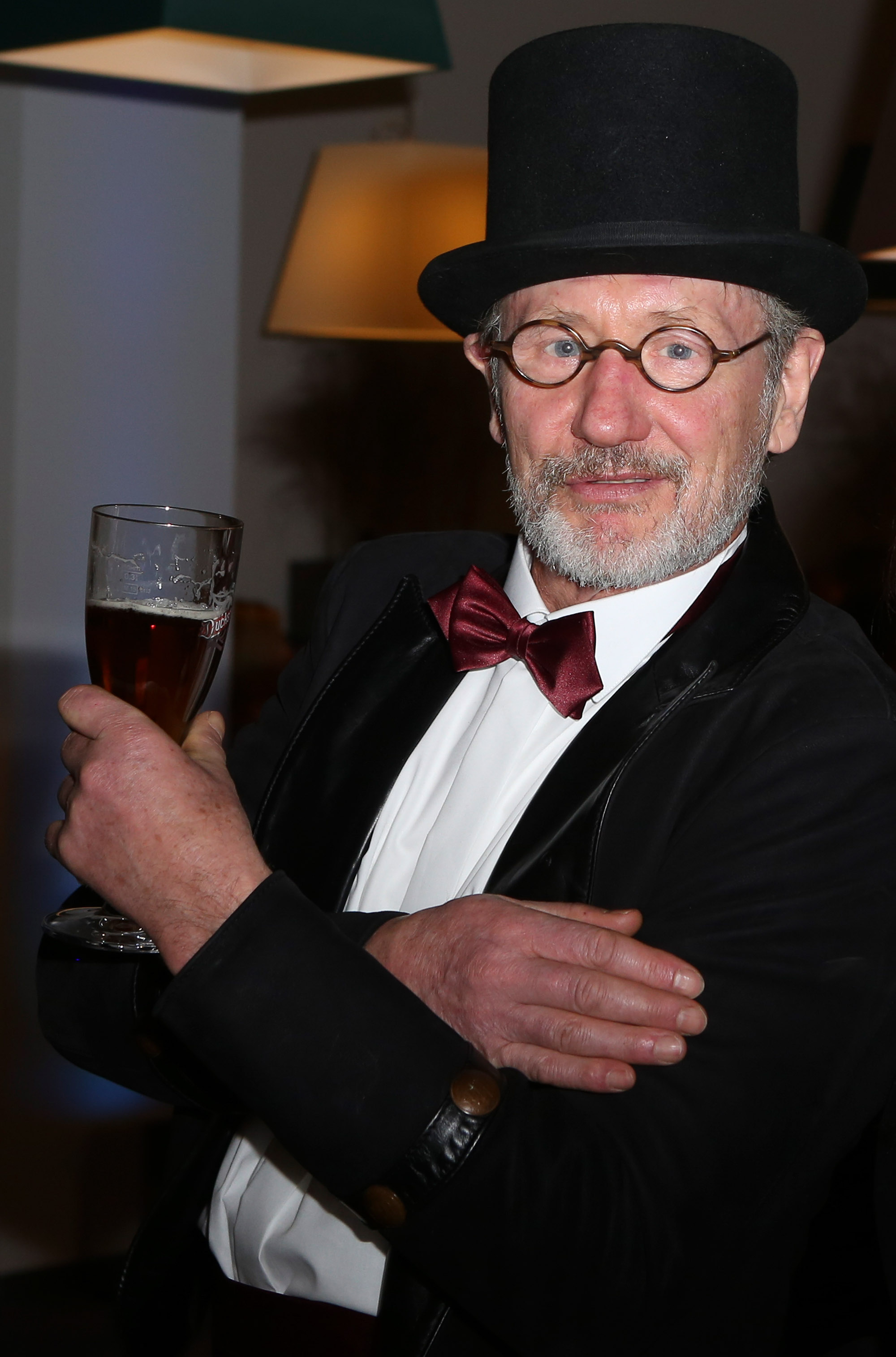
- Feldmann in Hamburg (2016)
- Born: 17 March 1950 (age 76) Travemünde, Germany
- Area: cartoonist
- Pseudonym: Brösel
- Notable works: Werner

Rötger Werner Friedrich Wilhelm Feldmann (born 17 March 1950 in Travemünde), a.k.a. Brösel (German pronunciation: [ˈbʁøːzl̩]), is a German comic book artist.

He is most famous for creating the character Werner.

== Life ==
Feldmann completed a lithographer apprenticeship at Nordrepro in Flensburg, after which he was drafted for basic military service where he fell ill with tuberculosis. In 1971 he started work as lithographer at Geisel in Flensburg. Because he drew cartoons and comics all the time – especially caricatures of his superiors – he was dismissed in 1972. Being out of work throughout the 1970s, Brösel mainly drew comics about the „Bakuninis“, an anarchistic family, satirizing the radical left.

His first cartoons with the character Werner were published in 1978 in the German satire magazine Pardon, as well as in the newspaper Kieler Stadtzeitung. One of the main inspirations for these were his constant battles with the German TÜV and police because of his Horex alterations, as well as his contact to the Chopper community. The comics were licensed by other city newspapers like the Frankfurt-based magazine Pflasterstrand and so quickly became known nationwide.

Book publications started in 1981 with Werner – Oder was?.

The first Werner movie, Werner – Beinhart!, was released in 1990, and was one of the most successful movies in Germany that year with 4.9 million viewers. The second movie, Werner: Eat My Dust!!!, was released in 1996, and was the second most successful movie that year in Germany with 4.95 million viewers. More movies followed in 1999 (Werner – Volles Rooäää!!!), 2003 (Werner – Gekotzt wird später!) and 2011 (Werner – Eiskalt!).

In 2021, Brösel Was a New Comic Book Der Fiese Willi.

Rötger Feldmann lives in Sören.
