= 1982 in comics =

Notable events of 1982 in comics.

== Events and publications ==
=== January ===
- January 3: The first episode of Bunny Matthews' comic series Vic and Nat'ly appears in print. The series will run until 2005.
- January 14: In the Belgian comic magazine Spirou, the first episode of the Spirou and Fantasio adventure, La boite noire, by Nic Broca and Raoul Cauvin, is serialized.
- 29-31 January: During the Angoulême International Comics Festival, Claire Bretécher becomes the first woman to win the Grand Prix de la ville d'Angoulême.
- Warren Publishing suspends publication.
- DC Comics Presents #41 features an insert previewing the new Wonder Woman creative team of writer Roy Thomas and artist Gene Colan as well as an update of the character's costume.
- House of Mystery #300: "Special Thrill-Filled 300th Issue," edited by Karen Berger. (DC Comics)
- Phantom Zone #1 (of a four-issue limited series), by Steve Gerber, Gene Colan, and Tony DeZuniga; published by DC Comics.
- Marvel Super-Heroes (1967 series), with issue #105, cancelled by Marvel.
- "Apocalypse War" Judge Dredd storyline begins in 2000 AD. (continues through July)
- Paris-Dakar by Jean Graton, 41st album of the Michel Vaillant series.
- The seventh issue of Jan Bucquoy's Belgian adult comics magazine Spetters focuses on Hergé in a direct reaction to the trial against Filip Denis' porn parody Tintin in Switzerland. The entire issue is deliberately made to offend Hergé in the crudest possible way and to defend the freedom of speech. This is a turning point in the career of Bucquoy, who will focus more and more on provocative stunts.

=== February ===
- The Flash #306 began a Doctor Fate backup series by writer Martin Pasko and artist Keith Giffen which ran through issue #313.
- The New Teen Titans #16 features an insert previewing the upcoming Captain Carrot and His Amazing Zoo Crew! series by Roy Thomas and Scott Shaw.
- Savage She-Hulk, with issue #25, is cancelled by Marvel.
- The final issue of Jan Bucquoy's Belgian adult comics magazine Spetters is published.
- In the Spanish horror magazine Creepy, Torpedo, by Enrique Sánchez Abulí and Jordi Bernet, make his debut.
- In linus, Made in Germany, by Guido Crepax; Valentina meets Effi Lang, a German girl who become a regular character in the series.

=== March ===
- March 1: In À Suivre, the first chapter of It Was the War of the Trenches by Jacques Tardi is published.
- March 27: Britain's weekly Eagle comic relaunched by IPC Media in a mostly photonovel format.
- March 29: The first episode of Mort Walker and Johnny Sajem's The Evermores appears in print. It will run until 1986.
- The debut of Alan Moore's new, darker Marvelman in Warrior #1.
- The debut of Alan Moore and David Lloyd's V for Vendetta in Warrior #1.
- Justice League of America #200: 76-page anniversary issue, "A League Divided". The double-sized issue was a "jam" featuring a story written by Gerry Conway, a framing sequence drawn by George Pérez, and chapters drawn by Pat Broderick, Jim Aparo, Dick Giordano, Gil Kane, Carmine Infantino, Brian Bolland, and Joe Kubert. Bolland's chapter gave the artist his "first stab at drawing Batman."
- DC's horror-suspense anthology Secrets of Haunted House ceases publication with issue #46.
- Flash Gordon (1966 series), with issue #37, is cancelled by the Gold Key Comics imprint Whitman Comics.
- Sarah Bernardt by Morris, Xavier Fauche and Jean Léturgie (Dargaud).
- La tribu fantome (The ghos tribe) – by Jean-Michel Charlier and Jean Giraud, last album of the “fugitive Blueberry”. trilogy.
- First regular issue of the Italian anthological magazine L'eternauta (Comic Art; an "issue zero" had already been published in October 1980). It contains the first of the "silent stories" by Carlos Trillo and Domingo Mandrafina.

=== April ===
- April 1 : in Pif Gadget, debut of Les enigmes de Tim by Jean-Pierre Dirick, series of one-page detective riddles.
- April 16: in Spirou, La proie et l’ombre by Roger Leloup.
- April 25: The final episode of Vahan Shirvanian's No Comment is published.
- Daredevil #181 – Bullseye fatally stabs Elektra.
- The long-running British series The Trigan Empire ceases publication with the cancellation of Look and Learn with issue #1042.
- In the Brazilian magazine Tio Patinhas, O Furacão Branco e Preto, by Gérson Luiz Borlotti Teixeira and Irineu Soares Rodrigues; debut of Biquinho, the Fethry Duck’s nephew.
- Gli uomini in nero (Men in black) by Alfredo Castelli and Giancarlo Alessandrini, first album of the Martin Mystere series (Sergio Bonelli)

=== May ===
- May 2:
  - The final episode of Frank O'Neal's Short Ribs is published.
  - Marten Toonder is named Officer in the Order of Orange-Nassau.
- May 3: In a Frank and Ernest gag by Bob Thaves a line about Hollywood actor Ginger Rogers' dance talent is published (She did everything he did, backwards and in high heels). The quote will eventually become one of the most often repeated descriptions about Rogers in non-fiction publications.
- To help raise money for his lawsuit against Marvel Comics for ownership of Howard the Duck, Steve Gerber brings out his own Destroyer Duck from Eclipse Comics.
- Fantastic Four Roast a one-shot written by Fred Hembeck is published by Marvel Comics.
- DC's long-running weird/horror anthology The Unexpected ceases publication with issue #222.
- Ghosts, with issue #112, is cancelled by DC.
- The Many Ghosts of Doctor Graves, with issue #72, is cancelled for the second time by Charlton.
- When the wind blows by Raymond Briggs (Hamish Hamilton)
- Rififi en F1 by Jean Graton, 40th album of the Michel Vaillant series.
- La galere noire (The black galley), by Jean Van Hamme and Grzegorz Rosiński, 14th album of the Thorgal series (Le Lombard).
- La vendetta di Ra (Ra’s revenge) by Alfredo Castelli and Giancarlo Alessandrini (Bonelli) ; Sergej Orlof, the Martin Mystere's nemesis, makes his debut.

=== June ===
- June 17: in Spirou, Virus by Tome and Janry.
- June 24: in Spirou, first episode of Les Archanges de Vinéa, by Roger Leloup.
- The first issue of the French comics magazine Psikopat is published. It will run until 2019.
- Fantagraphics publishes the Hernandez brothers (Jaime and Gilbert)'s Love & Rockets anthology.
- Marvel begins publishing the Hasbro-licensed series G.I. Joe: A Real American Hero, which would sell over 200,000 copies and out-sell Superman and the X-Men.
- Marvel Super Hero Contest of Champions #1 (of a three-issue limited series), by Mark Gruenwald, John Romita, Jr., and Bob Layton; published by Marvel Comics.
- The two-issue "Nothing Can Stop the Juggernaut!" storyline by creative team Roger Stern, John Romita Jr., and Jim Mooney begins in The Amazing Spider-Man #229.
- Silver Surfer one-shot scripted by Stan Lee, plotted and penciled by John Byrne, and inked by Tom Palmer is published by Marvel Comics.
- In A suivre, Les Murailles de Samaris by François Schuiten and Benoît Peeters, first chapter of the series Les Cités obscures.
- First issue of Gil by Ennio Missaglia (Bonelli), short-lived series with an “urban cowboy” as protagonist.
- First issue of the anthological magazine Orient express (Bonelli); it contains Rapsodia ungherese by Vittorio Giardino, first adventure of the private eye Max Fridman.
- Storia di una storia (History of an history) by Guido Crepax, comic version of Georges Bataille's Story of the eye, with Valentina (Olympia press).

=== July ===
- July 11: In Topolino, The Case of the Circulating Saucer, by Carlo Chendi e Giorgio Cavazzano; debut of Humphrey Gokart.
- The New Teen Titans #21 features an insert previewing the upcoming Night Force series by Marv Wolfman and Gene Colan.
- The Penguin Books imprint Plume releases Creepshow, a graphic novella based on the 1982 horror movie Creepshow.
- The Marvel UK storyline "Jaspers' Warp" (also known as "Crooked World") begins in Marvel Superheroes #387 (continuing through June 1984 in Mighty World of Marvel)

=== August ===
- August 1: The first episode of Tom Armstrong's Marvin is published.
- August 2: In Montréal, Canada, comics store Komico is opened.
- August 29: in Topolino, Paperino e il vento del Sud (Donald and the South wind), by Guido Martina and Giovan Battista Carpi, parody in five episodes of Gone with the wind.
- The Legion of Super-Heroes storyline "The Great Darkness Saga" begins with issue #290 (runs through December).
- Marvel Superheroes, with issue #388, is cancelled by Marvel UK; it replaced in all but name by The Mighty World of Marvel.
- The first episode of Massimo Mattioli's Squeak the Mouse is published.

=== September ===
- September 5: Gaspar (Oscar Barbery Suarez) launches his long-running political gag comic El Duende y su Camarilla.
- In Il giornalino, Fantasmi (Ghosts), by Gianni De Luca and Gian Luigi Gonano, last adventure of Commissario Spada.
- September 17: Marten Toonder wins the Stripschapprijs. The Jaarprijs voor Bijzondere Verdiensten (nowadays the P. Hans Frankfurtherprijs) is given to Nico Noordermeer.
- Marvel's Wolverine four-issue mini-series, by Chris Claremont and Frank Miller, begins.
- Marvel's Hercules: Prince of Power four-issue mini-series, by Bob Layton, begins.
- The Marvel/DC intercompany crossover The Uncanny X-Men and The New Teen Titans, by Chris Claremont, Walt Simonson, and Terry Austin.
- First issue of Love and Rockets by the Hernandez brothers (Fantagraphics)
- In Linus, Frau Rosselli und Fraulein Lang by Guido Crepax.
- In alter alter, Il ritorno della fenice, first of the two Dino Battaglia's stories with the occult investigator Inspector Coke as protagonist.
- In Pif gadget, Le Fils du Soleil by Roger Lécureux, first episode of the series Tarao, with the son of Rahan as protagonist.

=== October ===
- October 10r: first issue of the Italian anthological magazine Più (Editoriale Domus)
- Norristown, Pennsylvania–based Comico begins publishing with the release of the black-and-white anthology title Primer #1.
- With issue #251, DC again revives Blackhawk volume 1, which ran from 1944 to 1968, and then from 1976 to 1977.
- Josie and the Pussycats (1963 series) is cancelled by Archie Comics with issue #106.
- Justice League of America #207 and All-Star Squadron #14 feature the beginning of the "Crisis on Earth-Prime" crossover between the two titles. The storyline continues into Justice League of America #208 and All-Star Squadron #15 in November and concludes in Justice League of America #209 in December.
- La vengeance (The revenge) by Derib, 11th album of the Buddy Longway series (Le Lombard).
- Les fous de Kabul by Franz, first Lester Cockney album (Le Lombard).
- October 10 - Illustrator Ben Krefta is born

=== November ===
- November 8: The first episode of Bill Schorr's Conrad is published. It will run until 1986.
- November 28: in Topolino, The travels of Marco Polo or the Milione, by Guido Martina and Romano Scarpa; retelling with the ducks of the Venetian traveler's life.
- Jim Starlin's Dreadstar, the first title published by Marvel's creator-owned imprint Epic Comics, begins.
- Canadian publisher Vortex Comics makes its entrée into the comics world with its anthology Vortex
- Marvel's The Vision and the Scarlet Witch four-issue mini-series, by Bill Mantlo, Rick Leonardi, Ian Akin and Brian Garvey, begins.

=== December ===
- December 2: Pierre Makyo and Alain Dodier's Jérôme K. Jérôme Bloche debuts in Spirou.
- December 12: in Topolino, The secret of the Ice Sword by Massimo De Vita; the adventures of Mickey Mouse and Goofy in Argaar, a fantasy world inspired by The sword of Shannara. The story over the years gets five sequels.
- December 13: Kevin McCormick's Arnold makes its debut.
- December 20: Katsuhiro Otomo's Akira debuts in Young Magazine
- December 22: In Antwerp, comics store Mekanik Strip opens its doors.
- December 30 : in Spirou, Les faiseurs de silence, last Spirou story by Nic and Cauvin.
- DC publishes its first tailored direct market offering: the first of 12 issues of Camelot 3000, Mike W. Barr & Brian Bolland's future-set tale of King Arthur. It is widely recognized as the first "maxi-series".
- Detective Comics #521: Green Arrow becomes the backup feature.
- DC publishes the first issue of its three-issue Masters of the Universe mini-series
- Charlton Bullseye, with issue #10, canceled by Charlton.

=== Specific date unknown ===
- A Dutch comic artist, signing with the pseudonym Ave, publishes two pornographic parodies of the series Astérix, titled Asterix de Geilaard and Asterix op de Walletjes.
- San Diego–based independent publisher Pacific Comics makes a strong push in the marketplace, following Jack Kirby's Captain Victory and the Galactic Rangers with four new ongoing titles, Starslayer, Ms. Mystic, Twisted Tales, and Alien Worlds, featuring such established talents as Neal Adams and Mike Grell.
- To stem the flow of creators defecting to companies such as First Comics, Pacific Comics, and Eclipse Comics, DC Comics begins offering royalties to artists and writers of regular newsstand comics that sell more than 100,000 copies; Marvel soon follows suit with its creator-owned imprint Epic Comics. Launched by editor-in-chief Jim Shooter as a spin-off of the successful Epic Illustrated magazine, the Epic imprint allows creators to retain control and ownership of their properties. Co-edited by Al Milgrom and Archie Goodwin, the imprint also allows Marvel to publish a mature line of comics oriented toward an older audience. Epic titles are printed on higher quality paper than typical Marvel comics, and are only available via the direct market.
- Marvel debuts its Marvel Graphic Novels series, releasing five trade paperbacks over the course of the year: The Death of Captain Marvel, Elric: The Dreaming City, Dreadstar, The New Mutants, and X-Men: God Loves, Man Kills.
- Marvel publishes its first limited series titles: Marvel Super Hero Contest of Champions, Wolverine, Hercules: Prince of Power, and The Vision and the Scarlet Witch.
- After 41 years as a publisher, Harvey Comics ceases publishing.
- After ten years as a publisher, Spire Christian Comics ceases publishing original titles.
- Attempting to create synthesis for two Warner Communications subsidiaries, DC Comics teams up with Atari Inc. to publish Atari Force, storylines for Atari home console games. The comics are packed in with the games Defender, Berzerk, Star Raiders, Phoenix, and Galaxian.
- DC cancels its last three suspense/horror anthologies, The Unexpected, Ghosts, and Secrets of Haunted House.
- With the demise of New Media/Irjax, Steve Geppi takes over their warehouses and distribution centers and founds Diamond Comic Distributors; 14 years later the company would become the sole major comics distributor
- Independent publisher Paragon Publications changes its name to Americomics.
- Eric Schreurs' Joop Klepzeiker makes its debut in De Nieuwe Revu.
- Gary Panter and Jay Cotton release the comic book Pee-Dog. The Shit Generation.

== Exhibitions and shows ==
- September 17–October 9: Chester Gould's Dick Tracy, Graham Gallery, New York City — curated by Georgia Riley
- October 18–31: Marvel Art Exhibition (Institute of Contemporary Arts, London, England) — exhibition of original artwork by artists for Marvel Comics

== Conventions ==
- Katy-Kon 2 (Modesto, California) – 2nd convention dedicated to Katy Keene
- March 27–28: Dimension Convention (Statler Hotel, New York City) – dedicated to the artists and writers who created EC Comics.
- June: Heroes Convention (Charlotte, North Carolina) – First annual staging of the multigenre convention. Official guests: George Pérez, Marv Wolfman, Mike Zeck, Butch Guice, Romeo Tanghal
- June 5–6: Colorado Comic Art Convention II (Rocky Mountain School of Art, Denver, Colorado) – guests include Jim Payne, Michael Golden, and Bob Layton
- June 10–13: Fantasy Fair (Dallas, Texas) – inaugural show; guest: Philip José Farmer
- July 3–5: Comic Art Convention (Sheraton Hotel, New York City) – admission: $7/day; $15/weekend
- July 8–11: San Diego Comic-Con (Convention and Performing Arts Center and Hotel, San Diego, California) – 5,000 attendees; official guests: Carl Barks, Terry Beatty, Brian Bolland, Max Allan Collins, Will Eisner, Mike Grell, Chuck Jones, Hank Ketcham, Walter Koenig, Frank Miller, Arn Saba, Leonard Starr, Ken Steacy, Robert Williams
- July 10–11: Creation St. Louis (Bel-Air Hilton, St. Louis, Missouri) – guests include Michael Golden, Brent Anderson, and Tim Conrad
- July 16–18: Chicago Comicon (Americana-Congress Hotel, 520 S. Michigan Ave., Chicago, Illinois)
- July 24–25: Creation Washington, D.C. (Crystal Gateway Marriott, Arlington, Virginia) – affiliated with Geppi's Comic World
- August 13–15: Atlanta Fantasy Fair (Omni Hotel & Georgia World Congress Center, Atlanta, Georgia) – official guests include Frank Miller, Ray Harryhausen, Will Eisner, Philip Jose Farmer, Forrest J Ackerman, Bob Burden, Mike W. Barr, Dick Giordano, Brad Linaweaver, Somtow Sucharitkul, Len Wein, and musical guests Axis
- August 14–15: Creation Pittsburgh (Hyatt at Chatham Center, Pittsburgh, Pennsylvania) – guests include Josef Rubinstein and Mike W. Barr
- August 21–22: Creation Anaheim (Disneyland Hotel, Anaheim, CA) – guests include George Pérez and Michael Golden
- August 28–29: Creation New York (Statler Hilton Hotel, New York City) – guests include Frank Miller, John Byrne, Jack Kirby, Bill Sienkiewicz
- September: OrlandoCon (Orlando, Florida) — guests include C. C. Beck
- September 11–12: Creation Houston (Dunfey Houston Hotel, Houston, TX) – guests include Chris Claremont, Michael Golden, and David Prowse
- September 25–26: Comicana 82 (Regent Crest Hotel, London, England, UK) – produced by Fantasy Domain and Comic Showcase; special guest Frank Miller
- October: Minneapolis Comic-Con (Minneapolis, Minnesota) – guests & attendees include C. C. Beck, Joe Staton, Carol Kalish, Chris Claremont, Denis Kitchen, Joel Thingvall, Catherine Yronwode, Greg Howard, and Reed Waller
- October 23–24: Encounter 6 (Hilton Inn East, Wichita, Kansas)
- October 31–November 7: Salone Internazionale dei Comics a.k.a. "Lucca 15" (Lucca, Italy) — 15th edition of the festival
- November: Mid-Ohio Con (Mansfield, Ohio)

== Deaths ==
=== January ===
- January 2: Fred Harman, American comics artist (Bronc Peeler, Red Ryder), dies at age 79.
- January 8: Ray Thompson, American comics artist and illustrator (The Dubble Bubble Kids), dies at age 76.
- January 13: Walter Pogge van Ranken, German novelist and comics writer (Tipp & Tapp), dies at age 68.
- January 15: Wally Bishop, American comics artist (Muggs and Skeeter), dies at age 77.
- January 19:
  - Harry Hanan, British comic artist (Louie), dies at age 65.
  - Charles Plumb, American comics artist (Ella Cinders, Chris Crusty), dies at age 81.
- January 29: John Liney, American comics artist (continued Henry), dies at age 69 or 70.

=== February ===
- February 3: Arent Christensen, Norwegian comics artist (adventure and science fiction comics based on Christian Haugen's novels), dies at age 87.
- February 13: Gluyas Williams, American comics artist (made cartoons and pantomime comics for The New Yorker), dies at age 93.
- February 18: Jan Rot, Dutch illustrator, caricaturist, songwriter, poster, advertising and comics artist, dies at age 89.
- February 27: Carlo Bisi, Italian comics artist (Sor Pampurio), dies at age 91.

=== March ===
- March 28: Dave Sheridan, American comics artist (Tales from the Leather Nun, co-worked on The Fabulous Furry Freak Brothers), dies at age 38 or 39.

=== April ===
- April 2: Birger Malmborg, Swedish comics artist and cartoonist (Götlund), dies at age 72.
- April 13: Sam Glankoff, aka Glan, American comics artist (How Do You Handle It?), dies at age 87.
- April 23: Georges Beuville, French illustrator and comics artist (comics based on classic adventure novels), dies at age 80.

=== May ===
- May 11: Jan Dirk van Exter, Dutch comics artist (Jan Kordaat, Brommy and Tommy), dies at age 66.
- May 27: Joke, Belgian cartoonist (worked on the comic series Jan Zonder Vrees), dies at age 47 from cancer.

=== June ===
- June 4: Henning Dahl Mikkelsen, aka Mik, Danish comics artist (Ferd'nand), dies at age 67 from a heart attack.
- June 10: Karel Links, Dutch illustrator and comics artist (Moffenspiegel, Het is niet waar... dat hebben we niet gewild!), dies at age 66.
- June 30: Abner Dean, American cartoonist, illustrator and comics artist (published in The New Yorker and Life), dies at age 72.

=== July ===
- July 2: Jack Bogle, American animator and comics artist (Felix the Cat comics, Ozzy And His Gym, Dell Comics), dies at age 81.
- July 6: Warren Tufts, American comics artist (Casey Ruggles, Lance) and animator, dies at age 56.
- July 8: Sylvan Byck, American comics editor (King Features), dies at age 77.
- July 9: Jehan Sennep, French illustrator, caricaturist, journalist and occasional comics artist, dies at age 88.
- July 25: Harold Foster, American comics artist (Prince Valiant, Tarzan) dies at age 89.

=== August ===
- August 15: Ernie Bushmiller, American comics artist (Nancy, continued Fritzi Ritz), dies at age 76.
- August 18: Carlos Botelho, Portuguese painter, illustrator, caricaturist and comics artist (Punchos de Bronze , Les Aventuras do Zuncha, artista de Circo, Ecos da Semana), dies at age 82.

=== September ===
- September 7: José Cabrero Arnal, Spanish-French comics artist (Pif le chien, Placid et Muzo), dies at age 73.
- September 12: Gian Giacomo Dalmasso, Italian comics writer (Pantera Bionda), dies at age 75.
- September 13: Reed Crandall, American comics artist (Blackhawk and EC Comics), dies at age 65.
- September 16: Courtney Dunkel, American comics artist (Hannah), dies at age 79.
- September 23: Gene Day, Canadian comics artist (Star Wars, Master of Kung Fu) dies of a coronary while crossing a street. He is only around 30 years old.
- September 29: Marcel Turin, aka Mat, French comics artist, dies at age 86.

=== October ===
- October 3: Noel Sickles, American comics artist and illustrator (continued Scorchy Smith), dies at age 72.

=== November ===
- November 8: Marco de Gastyne, French film director, illustrator and comics artist, dies at age 93.
- November 28: Manuel A. Martinez Parma, Argentine comic artist (Cosas de Negros, Alelí, Cristian), dies at age 72 or 73.
- November 29: Robert Fuzier, French comics artist (Dédé et Doudou, Les Aventures de Pat'soum, Capitaine Passe-Partout, Cartouche), dies at age 83.

=== Specific date unknown ===
- Carl Lyon, Australian comics artist (Tootles, The Eagle, The Astounding Mr. Storm, Tim O'Hara), dies at age 78 or 79.
- Dan Noonan, American animator and comics artist (assisted on Pogo, made comics for Western Publishing), dies at age 71.
- H.E. Pease, British comics artist (Professor Jolly and his Magic Brolly, Cas of Cosnem's College, Tich the Tiny Tec), dies at age 73 or 74.
- Eric Roberts, British comics artist (Helpful Henry, Dirty Dick, Winker Watson), dies at age 72.
- Kaneko Shigemasa, Japanese comic artist (Shin Nipponto - Sho-chan no Boken), dies at age 69 or 70.

== Awards ==
=== Eagle Awards ===
Presented in 1983 for comics published in 1982:

- Best Story: V for Vendetta, by Alan Moore and David Lloyd (Warrior, Quality Communications)
- Best New Book: Teen Titans, by Marv Wolfman and George Pérez (DC Comics)
- Character Most Worthy of Own Title: Judge Anderson, 2000 AD (Fleetway)
- Best Comics Writer: Alan Moore, V for Vendetta (Warrior, Quality Communications)
- Favourite Artist: Bill Sienkiewicz
- Best UK Title: Warrior, edited by Dez Skinn
- Favourite Artist (UK): Brian Bolland

== First issues by title ==
=== DC Comics ===
Captain Carrot and His Amazing Zoo Crew!

Release: March. Writer: Roy Thomas. Artists: Ross Andru, Scott Shaw, and Bob Smith

Daring New Adventures of Supergirl

Release: November. Writer: Paul Kupperberg. Artists: Carmine Infantino and Bob Oksner

The Fury of Firestorm

Release: June. Writer: Gerry Conway. Artists: Pat Broderick and Rodin Rodriguez.

Saga of the Swamp Thing

Release: May. Writer: Martin Pasko. Artist: Thomas Yeates.

==== Limited series ====
Atari Force: Promos distributed with Atari 2600 video games.

Writers: Gerry Conway and Roy Thomas. Artists: Ross Andru, Mike DeCarlo, and Dick Giordano

Camelot 3000

Release: December. Writer: Mike W. Barr. Artist: Brian Bolland

=== Marvel Comics ===
Dreadstar

Release: November by Epic Comics. Writer/Artist: Jim Starlin

G.I. Joe: A Real American Hero

Release: June. Writer: Larry Hama. Artists: Herb Trimpe and Bob McLeod

Marvel Fanfare

Release: March. Editor: Al Milgrom

Marvel Graphic Novel: "The Death of Captain Marvel"

Release: January. Writer/Artist: Jim Starlin.

The Mighty World of Marvel vol. 2

Release by Marvel UK: June. Editor: Dez Skinn.

==== Limited series ====
Hercules

Release: September. Writer/Artist: Bob Layton.

Marvel Super Hero Contest of Champions

Release: June. Writer: Mark Gruenwald. Artists John Romita, Jr. and Bob Layton.

The Vision and the Scarlet Witch

Release: November. Writer: Bill Mantlo. Artists: Rick Leonardi, Ian Akin, and Brian Garvey.

Wolverine

Release: September. Writer: Chris Claremont. Artists: Frank Miller and Josef Rubinstein.

=== Pacific Comics ===
Alien Worlds

Release: December. Editor: Bruce Jones

Ms. Mystic

Release: October. Writer/Artist: Neal Adams

Starslayer: The Log of the Jolly Roger

Release: February. Writer/Artist: Mike Grell

Twisted Tales

Release: November. Editor: Bruce Jones

=== Other publishers ===
Destroyer Duck

Release: May by Eclipse Comics. Writer: Steve Gerber. Artist: Jack Kirby

Domino chance
Release: May by Chance Enterprises. Writer/Artist: Kevin Lenagh

Love and Rockets

Release: June by Fantagraphics. Writers/Artists: Los Bros Hernandez

Primer

Release: October by Comico.

Vortex

Release: November by Vortex Comics. Editor: William P. Marks

Warrior

Release: March by Quality Communications. Writer: Alan Moore. Artists: Garry Leach and Alan Davis

== Initial appearances by character name ==
=== DC Comics ===
- Adrian Chase in New Teen Titans #23 (September)
- Alexander Luthor in DC Comics Presents Annual #1 (1982)
- Ambush Bug in DC Comics Presents #52 (December)
- Arion in The Warlord #55 (March)
- Aristides Demetrios in DC Comics Presents #46 (June)
- Baron Winters in New Teen Titans #21 (July)
- Bethany Snow in New Teen Titans #22 (August)
- Blackfire in New Teen Titans #22 (August)
- Black Bison in Firestorm #1 (June)
- Brother Blood in New Teen Titans #21
- Bushmaster in DC Comics Presents #46 (June)
- Captain Carrot and His Amazing Zoo Crew! in New Teen Titans #16
- Chameleon Girl in Legion of Super-Heroes #287 (May)
- Ch'p in Green Lantern #148
- Donovan Caine in New Teen Titans #21 (July)
- Firehawk in Firestorm #1 (June)
- Frances Kane in New Teen Titans #17 (March)
- Global Guardians in DC Comics Presents #46
- Hamilton Hill in Detective Comics #511 (February)
- Helen Alexandros in Wonder Woman #288 (February)
- Invisible Kid in Legion of Super-Heroes Annual #1 (1982)
- Jack Gold in New Teen Titans #21 (July)
- Lord Damyn in New Teen Titans #24 (October)
- Lydea Mallor in Legion of Super-Heroes #290 (August)
- Michael Beldon in New Teen Titans #20 (June)
- Mirage in Detective Comics #511 (February)
- Monitor in New Teen Titans #21 (July)
- Myrra Rhodes in Weird War Tales #110 (April)
- Plastique in The Fury of Firestorm #7 (December)
- Psions in New Teen Titans #4 (February)
- Rising Sun in DC Comics Presents #46 (June)
- Royal Flush Gang (second version) in Justice League of America #203 (June)
- Ryand'r in Tales of the New Teen Titans #4 (September)
- Salaak in Green Lantern #149 (February)
- Terra in New Teen Titans #26 (December)
- Thunderlord in DC Comics Presents #46 (June)
- Vanessa van Helsing in New Teen Titans #21 (July)
- X'Hal in New Teen Titans #24 (October)

=== Marvel Comics ===
- Acanti in Uncanny X-Men #156
- Arcanna in The Defenders #112 (October)
- Brood in Uncanny X-Men #155
- Cloak and Dagger in Peter Parker, the Spectacular Spider-Man #64
- Luna in Fantastic Four #240 (March)
- Marada in Epic Illustrated #10 (Feb)
- Monica Rambeau in The Amazing Spider-Man Annual #16
- New Mutants in Marvel Graphic Novel #4: The New Mutants
  - Cannonball
  - Danielle Moonstar
  - Sunspot
  - Wolfsbane
- Nuke in The Defenders #112 (October)
- Obadiah Stane in Iron Man #163 (October)
- Power Princess in The Defenders #112 (October)
- Raymond Sikorsky in Uncanny X-Men #156 (April)
- William Stryker in X-Men: God Loves, Man Kills
- Varnae in Bizarre Adventures #33
- Vermin in Captain America #272
- Vertigo in Marvel Fanfare #1 (March)
- Yukio in Wolverine #2

=== Other titles ===
- Grendel in Primer #2, published by Comico
- Groo the Wanderer in Destroyer Duck #1, published by Eclipse Comics
- Marvelous Maureen in Pep Comics #383 (Apr.), published by Archie Comics
- Ms. Mystic in Captain Victory and the Galactic Rangers #3, published by Pacific Comics
- Rocketeer in Starslayer #2, published by Pacific Comics
- The Warpsmiths in Warrior Summer Special #4, published by Quality Communications
