= La jeunesse de Spirou =

Spirou et Fantasio #38 La jeunesse de Spirou
- Cover of the Belgian edition
- Date: 1987
- Series: Spirou et Fantasio
- Publisher: Dupuis

Creative team
- Writers: Tome
- Artists: Janry

Original publication
- Published in: Spirou magazine
- Issues: 1. ? - #?
- Date of publication: 1981 - 1984
- Language: French
- ISBN: 2-8001-1420-7

Chronology
- Preceded by: Le réveil du Z, 1986
- Followed by: Spirou à New-York, 1987

La jeunesse de Spirou, written by Tome and drawn by Janry, is the thirty-eighth album of the Spirou et Fantasio series, and the sixth of the authors. The stories were serialised in Spirou magazine before they were compiled as a hardcover album in 1987. This eventually launched the formal spin-off series Le Petit Spirou.

== Story ==
Spip comments on articles left in the press about Spirou and Fantasio.

- The youth of Spirou (1983) Oncle Paul, one evening of festival sprinkled well, tells an eccentric and more or less truthful version of the youth of the hero and his companions.
- Unpleasant forger! (1983) Spirou inquires into a forger who publishes a Gaston Lagaffe n°5 pirate comic book. It finds its cushy job quickly but the gangster succeeds in fleeing by setting fire to the building.
- The groom of the president (1982) One evening of midnight supper, Spirou, as usual wearing the clothes of a groom, or bell boy, is commanded by the hotel director who mistakes Spirou for one of his employees, making him operate the elevator at the moment when the American president arrives in the hotel. As the president is eager to spend a night without his bodyguards, he offers Spirou an occasion to flee. The US President is a cartoon of Ronald Reagan as the book was published in the eighties.
- Incredible Burp! (1984) The Count of Champignac discovers during an experiment that one of its products causes horrible changes on an alive body in contact with alcohol. Dupilon swallows some inadvertently, with the result that a monster is released on Champignac. However, the attention of Spirou and Fantasio are taken by gangsters who direct the post office of the village. The gangsters are finally overcome and nobody will recognize Dupilon, quickly cured, in the monster.
- Park with the stereotype! (1981) The Count of Champignac meets with former comrades in order to present inventions at strictly humane goal, with the castle at Champignac. However, a spy was introduced among the guests. Spirou and Fantasio are charged to uncover it. Actually, it proves quickly that they are two, but that does not prevent the two heroes from neutralizing them
