= Vito la Déveine =

Spirou et Fantasio #43 Vito la Déveine
- Cover of the Belgian edition
- Date: 1991
- Series: Spirou et Fantasio
- Publisher: Dupuis

Creative team
- Writers: Tome
- Artists: Janry

Original publication
- Published in: Spirou magazine
- Issues: 1. 2788 - #2798
- Date of publication: 1991
- Language: French
- ISBN: 2-8001-1891-1

Chronology
- Preceded by: Spirou à Moscou, 1990
- Followed by: Le rayon noir, 1993

Vito la Déveine, written by Tome and drawn by Janry, is the forty-third album of the Spirou et Fantasio series, and the eleventh album created by the authors. The story was serialised in Spirou magazine before it was released as a hardcover album in 1991.

== Story ==
After the intervention of Spirou and Fantasio in New York, the former mafia boss Don Vito Cortizone (from Spirou à New York) is deposed and is now called "Unlucky Vito". Cortizone's only hope of returning to power resides in the mysterious cargo of a seaplane which flies him over the Pacific. As the plane's pilot, Von Schnabbel, tries to extort money from him, the two men argue and Von Schnabbel is ejected from the cockpit. Cortizone is left alone with the plane's controls. After crashing the aircraft on the bottom of a lagoon in an atoll, he is helped by Spirou and Fantasio, on holiday nearby, who initially do not recognize him.

Taking advantage of Fantasio's feelings of depression, Cortizone neutralizes Spirou thanks to a homemade drug, and persuades Fantasio to retrieve his cargo. This cargo later proves to be a large quantity of bad luck charms, stolen from Chinese Triads. However, the Chinese arrive, guided by Von Schnabbel. Cortizone, Spirou and Fantasio are taken captive but the two heroes manage to flee by leaving Cortizone and Von Schnabbel on the atoll, while the Chinese become victims of an explosion.
