= Aventure en Australie =

Book

Spirou et Fantasio #34 Aventure en Australie
- Cover of the Belgian edition
- Date: 1985
- Series: Spirou et Fantasio
- Publisher: Dupuis

Creative team
- Writers: Tome
- Artists: Janry

Original publication
- Published in: Spirou magazine
- Issues: 1. 2344 - #2355
- Date of publication: 1983
- Language: French
- ISBN: 2-8001-1078-3

Chronology
- Preceded by: Virus, 1984
- Followed by: Qui arrêtera Cyanure?, 1985

Aventure en Australie, written by Tome and drawn by Janry, is the thirty-fourth album of the Spirou et Fantasio series, and the second of the authors. The story was initially serialised in Spirou magazine, before released as a hardcover album in 1985.

== Story ==
In Adventure in Australia, the Count of Champignac, accompanied by a young professor, Walker Donahue, thinks he has made an extraordinary discovery in Australia, namely an immense indigenous monolith in the surroundings of a mining village. He asks Spirou and Fantasio to join them. Thus, the two go to the Australia, accompanied by Seccotine, which was essential. When they arrive, Donahue informs them that the Count was killed by miners. After investigation, they discover that the Count did not die but the heroes find him in bad shape, face to face with Sam, a gangster who grows rich by holding prospectors to ransom. Sam ends up dying when his truck explodes because of a bottle of nitroglycerin. Thanks to the aboriginals, of which they were allies, Spirou, Donahue and the Count put in rout Sam's men who are trying to eliminate Fantasio and Seccotine. Finally, the monolith is discovered and the aboriginals make an agreement to share resources with the prospectors, who are grateful to them for getting rid of Sam.

== Film adaptation ==
Adventure in Australia was made into an episode of the animated Spirou et Fantasio TV series.
