= L'horloger de la comète =

Spirou et Fantasio #36 L'horloger de la comète
- Cover of the Belgian edition
- Date: 1986
- Series: Spirou et Fantasio
- Publisher: Dupuis

Creative team
- Writers: Tome
- Artists: Janry

Original publication
- Published in: Spirou magazine
- Issues: 1. 2427 - #2448
- Date of publication: 1984
- Language: French
- ISBN: 2-8001-1264-6

Chronology
- Preceded by: Qui arrêtera Cyanure?, 1985
- Followed by: Le réveil du Z, 1986

L'horloger de la comète, written by Tome and drawn by Janry, is the thirty-sixth album of the Spirou et Fantasio series, and the fourth of the authors. The story was initially serialised in Spirou magazine, before released as a hardcover album in 1985.

== Story ==
In The Comet's Watchmaker, The Count de Champignac goes to visit his great nephew and entrusts the castle to Spirou and Fantasio, who both hope to relax. However, a strange vessel crashes in their garden and an individual resembling the Count de Champignac, accompanied by a strange creature, Snouffelaire, disembark. The individual proves to be the descendant of the Count, Aurélien, come from the future to look for the seeds of some plants that are extinct in his time in order to preserve them, located in the forest of Palombia.

Knowing about the hostile environment of the Palombian jungle, Spirou proposes that he and Fantasio accompany Aurélien. However a malfunction sends the vessel to the sixteenth century during the Portuguese colonization of Palombie. Spirou, Fantasio and Aurélien are confronted by the hostile cannibals and the colonists who take them for French spies. Finally, Aurélien's vessel disintegrates, but strange individuals come from even further in the future to save them and to bring them back to their respective times.
