= La vallée des bannis =

Spirou et Fantasio #41 La vallée des bannis
- Cover of the Belgian edition
- Date: 1989
- Series: Spirou et Fantasio
- Publisher: Dupuis

Creative team
- Writers: Tome
- Artists: Janry

Original publication
- Published in: Spirou magazine
- Issues: 1. 2672 - #2686
- Date of publication: 1989
- Language: French
- ISBN: 2-8001-1704-4

Chronology
- Preceded by: La frousse aux trousses, 1988
- Followed by: Spirou à Moscou, 1990

La vallée des bannis, written by Tome and drawn by Janry, is the forty first volume in the Spirou et Fantasio series, and the ninth from the Tome & Janry team. The story was serialised in Spirou magazine before it was released as a hardcover volume in 1989.

== Story ==
In La vallée des bannis, carried away by a furious torrent during their passage through Touboutt-Chan (from the previous story La frousse aux trousses), Spirou and Fantasio regain consciousness in the hostile environment of the "Valley of Banishment", their destination. Fantasio is soon infected by a mosquito carrying a virus, making him act extremely crazy. He runs off into the wild, and Spirou is forced to begin exploration of the area with only Spip as a companion.

Spirou discovers the tragic destiny of the first people exiled in the valley, and while searching for other survivors and a way leading out of the valley, seeks a way to secure Fantasio's return and cure his state of madness.
