= Qui arrêtera Cyanure? =

35th album of the Spirou et Fantasio series

Spirou et Fantasio #35 Qui arrêtera Cyanure?
- Cover of the Belgian edition
- Date: 1985
- Series: Spirou et Fantasio
- Publisher: Dupuis

Creative team
- Writers: Tome
- Artists: Janry

Original publication
- Published in: Spirou magazine
- Issues: 1. 2427 - #2448
- Date of publication: 1984
- Language: French
- ISBN: 2-8001-1136-4

Chronology
- Preceded by: Aventure en Australie, 1985
- Followed by: L'horloger de la comète, 1986

Qui arrêtera Cyanure?, written by Tome and drawn by Janry, is the thirty-fifth album of the Spirou et Fantasio series, and the third of the authors. The story was initially serialised in Spirou magazine, before released as a hardcover album in 1985. The book cover was based on the poster of the James Bond movie For Your Eyes Only.

== Story ==
Swindled by a shopkeeper, Fantasio finds himself in the possession of a strange automaton able to take photographs. Apparently intelligent, the machine quickly escapes from its new owner. Spirou and Fantasio follow it to Champignac, where the automaton stops in an old unused railway station. There, they discover a bound and gagged young woman, whom they untie. She appears hostile and flees after destroying the station's interior. The owner of the place, Caténaire, a former station master, discovers the chaos when he returns and explains everything: the robot that Fantasio bought, Télesphore, was his first invention, while the woman which they freed is a more advanced android, Cyanure, evil and endowed with powers to control electrical machines. Cyanure tries to invade the village with an army of robots built in the nearby factory Roboc Inc.. Spirou and Fantasio mobilise a resistance, made up of the children of Champignac, and together they defeat the android and her army.
