= Le réveil du Z =

Spirou et Fantasio #37 Le réveil du Z
- Cover of the Belgian edition
- Date: 1986
- Series: Spirou et Fantasio
- Publisher: Dupuis

Creative team
- Writers: Tome
- Artists: Janry

Original publication
- Published in: Spirou magazine
- Issues: 1. 2487 - #2508
- Date of publication: 1985
- Language: French
- ISBN: 2-8001-1386-3

Chronology
- Preceded by: L'horloger de la comète, 1986
- Followed by: La jeunesse de Spirou, 1987

Le réveil du Z, written by Tome and drawn by Janry, is the thirty-seventh album of the Spirou et Fantasio series, and the fifth of the authors. The story was initially serialised in Spirou magazine before being released as a hardcover album in 1986.

== Story ==
In The Awakening of Z, after the extraordinary temporal adventure that they have just lived at the sides of Aurélien de Champignac, Spirou and Fantasio resume their journalistic activities. Fantasio is confronted with the skepticism of his new director of information, Kakeukh, who refuses to publish his article about the adventure. Being drunk, Fantasio is victim of an accident in the staircase of the Dupuis Editions, which obliges him to remain at the house with Spirou. The same evening, Snouffelaire appears in the house and it is suddenly transported to 2062, the time of Aurélien.

They quickly discover, in company of So-Yah, the assistant of Aurélien, that the world is at the mercy of the descendant of Zorglub. Captured by Zorglhommes, they rejoin Aurélien but succeed in escaping before breaking the Zorgloge, the heart of Zorglub Jr's power. Aurélien, grateful, returns them to their own time.
