= La frousse aux trousses =

Spirou et Fantasio #40 La frousse aux trousses
- Cover of the Belgian edition
- Date: 1988
- Series: Spirou et Fantasio
- Publisher: Dupuis

Creative team
- Writers: Tome
- Artists: Janry

Original publication
- Published in: Spirou magazine
- Issues: 1. 2611 - #2632
- Date of publication: 1988
- Language: French
- ISBN: 2-8001-1619-6

Chronology
- Preceded by: Spirou à New-York, 1987
- Followed by: La vallée des bannis, 1989

La frousse aux trousses, written by Tome and drawn by Janry, is the fortieth album of the Spirou et Fantasio series, and the eighth of the authors. The story was originally serialised in Spirou magazine under the title Angoisse à Touboutt–Chan, before released in a hardcover album under the altered title later in 1987.

== Story ==
In La frousse aux trousses, Spirou and Fantasio intend to make a journey to Touboutt-Chan in order to clarify the fate of Adrien Maginot and Günter Siegfried, who disappeared in the 1930s while seeking a mythical place in this area of the world, the Valley of the Outlaws. However the two journalists have trouble finding the funds necessary to the achievement of their project. They are then contacted by Doctor Placebo, who is persuaded that frightening experiences are a sure-fire cure for hiccups. He offers the two heroes funding for the trip, on condition that they take along the patients sent to them by the doctor, in the hope that their experiences will prove his theory.

Guided by the native Gorpah, the two heroes and their incredible companions are confronted with soldiers, rebels and bad weather. At the climax of the adventure, Spirou and Fantasio are carried away by a torrent of water, leaving the patients cured of their hiccups, but undeniably depressed.
