= Angoulême International Comics Festival Humour award =

Former comics award at the Angoulême festival

The Humour award was presented to a comic at the Angoulême International Comics Festival from 1989 until 2001.

== 1980s ==
- 1989: Les vieux copains plein de pépins by Florence Cestac

== 1990s ==
- 1990: Raoul Fulgurex: Le secret du mystère by Tronchet and Gelli
- 1991: Le pauvre chevalier by F'Murr
- 1991 (joint winner): L'encyclopédie des bébés part 3 by Daniel Goossens
- 1992: Le Petit Spirou by Tome (author) and Janry (artist), Dupuis
- 1993: Raymond Calbuth by Tronchet
- 1994: Les Closh: Le grand karma by Radis and Bobo, Les Humanoïdes Associés
- 1995: La vache: A mort l'homme, vive l'ozone by Johan De Moor and Stephen Desberg, Casterman
- 1996: Poignées d'amour by Willem
- 1997: Le démon de midi by Florence Cestac
- 1998: Jean-Claude Tergal: Portraits de famille by Tronchet
- 1999: Agrippine et l'ancêtre by Claire Bretécher

== 2000s ==
- 2000: Blotch part 1 by Blutch, Fluide Glacial
- 2001: Napoléon et Bonaparte by Rochette, Casterman
  - Les années Sputnik: C’est moi le chef! by Baru, Casterman
  - Dans l'cochon tout est bon by Mazan, Delcourt
  - Donjon parade: Un donjon de trop by Joann Sfar, Lewis Trondheim and Emmanuel Larcenet, Delcourt
  - La mort et Lao Tseu: Pas de quartier! by François Boucq, Casterman
