= Spip (comics character) =

Publication information
- Publisher: Dupuis (Belgium)
- First appearance: Spirou et Fantasio
- Created by: Rob-Vel

Spip is a fictional Eurasian red squirrel and a main character in the Belgian comic strip Spirou et Fantasio. He is Spirou's pet and was the first recurring supporting character in the series.

== History ==
The character made its debut in the second Spirou story, L'Héritage de Bill Money (Bill Money's Heritage, 1939) by Rob-Vel. Spirou saves him from the mad and sadistic Sosthène Silly in the story, but otherwise the animal remained a mere anecdotal character. It wasn't until Jijé took over the series that Spip became one of the main cast members and even gained the ability to talk, although humans don't understand it. When André Franquin took over the series he introduced the Marsupilami, a character who had somewhat stolen the spotlight away from Spip in many stories. However, when Franquin quit drawing Spirou & Fantasio, he retained the rights to the Marsupilami, and it ceased to appear in new Spirou stories, thus making Spip once again more prominent in the new Spirou stories by different creators.

=== Rob-Vel and Jijé periods ===
Spip is saved by Spirou in Rob-Vel's and Jijé's first joint adventure L'Héritage de Bill Money (The Inheritance of Bill Money, 1938), and from then on he stands by his master's side. Under Rob-vel his presence is just visual, occasionally serving to gnaw ropes that bind his master, or adding to a comical detail. It is under Jijé's authorship he gains the capacity to speak through "thought balloons" (similar to Snoopy and Garfield). From this point he is given to state his opinion on any situation, often in a comical manner, and his communications appear to be understood.

=== Franquin period ===
Under André Franquin's authorship, Spirou and Fantasio lose the ability to understand Spip, and when the Marsupilami joins the family, he also loses a great deal of attention but gains the perspective to feel ignored and underappreciated. In the shadow of his extraordinary fellow pet, he is less influential, although there are exceptions. In La corne de rhinoceros, he saves his friends from an angry elephant, earning him the title "king of creation". Near the end of this era, in QRN sur Bretzelburg, he is allowed to shine.

=== Fournier period ===
Jean-Claude Fournier 's Spip continues where Franquin's left off, his sarcasms becoming more frequent and self-pitying. He occasionally breaks the fourth wall, acknowledging that he is in a comic book and sometimes even complaining that Spirou and Fantasio are not exactly his idea of comic book heroes. Complaints aside, he was still an active (if often unwilling) participant in the stories, even saving the day on a few occasions, such as in L'abbaye truquée.

=== Tome & Janry period ===
In the beginning, Tome and Janry continued Spip much as Fournier had, letting him make biting remarks about whatever situation he was in, providing comedy relief and occasionally contributing to the plots. However, as the series evolved and grew more dramatic and mature, Spip's role was greatly reduced, his comments becoming less frequent until he stopped talking entirely. In later albums he's more or less a background character, still always by Spirou's side but seldom noticed by anyone. This was even parodied in Spirou à Moscou, where he after a kidnapping spends much of the story with a Band-Aid covering his mouth, and Spirou and Fantasio don't notice it.

== Character ==
Spip is featured in almost every Spirou story. Usually he provides sarcastic commentary on the events taking place around him. Humans don't understand him, however, so only readers are able to tell what's on his mind. He is stubborn and somewhat reluctant and even scared to go on adventures with his owner. Still, Spip has saved Spirou and Fantasio on many occasions. The animal has his own spot in Spirou's house and sleeps in an old slipper, typically dreaming about nuts.

== Etymology ==
The word "Spip" is a short variant of the word "spirou", which is Walloon dialect for "squirrel", thus explaining why he is Spirou's pet.

== In popular culture ==
Spip is somewhat of a counterpart to Tintin's Snowy and therefore often used in merchandise. The character is portrayed on a wall in the Rue Notre Dame des Grâces/ Onze-Lieve-Vrouw van Gratiestraat in Brussels as part of the Brussels' Comic Book Route, along with other characters from Spirou and Fantasio.
