= Spirou à Moscou =

Spirou et Fantasio #42 Spirou à Moscou
- Cover of the Belgian edition
- Date: 1990
- Series: Spirou et Fantasio
- Publisher: Dupuis

Creative team
- Writers: Tome
- Artists: Janry

Original publication
- Published in: Spirou magazine
- Issues: 1. 2736 - #2747
- Date of publication: 1990
- Language: French
- ISBN: 2-8001-1783-4

Chronology
- Preceded by: La vallée des bannis, 1989
- Followed by: Vito la Déveine, 1991

Spirou à Moscou, written by Tome and drawn by Janry, is the forty-second album of the Spirou et Fantasio series, and the tenth of the authors. The story was serialised in Spirou magazine before it was released as a hardcover album in 1990.

== Story ==
Moments before their departure on holiday to the tropics, Spirou and Fantasio are taken by the DST for the KGB which needs them. They're told that Moscow is being terrorised by the mysterious 'White Prince of the Russian Mafia', Tanaziof. According to the KGB's information this man is an old enemy of the two heroes. If Spirou and Fantasio help to solve the case, Russia will free a French journalist who they've taken custody.

In Moscow, Spirou and Fantasio discover that Tanaziof is none other than Zantafio, Fantasio's evil cousin. Zantafio's inept second-in-command, Nikita Vlalarlev, tries to assassinate the two heroes by crushing them with a part of monument, but fails. Zantafio is planning to abduct the body of Lenin and to ask the Russian government for a huge ransom for its return. Spirou and Fantasio succeed in thwarting these plans. Zantafio manages to escape.
