= Virus (Spirou et Fantasio) =

Spirou et Fantasio #33 Virus
- Cover of the Belgian edition
- Date: 1984
- Series: Spirou et Fantasio
- Publisher: Dupuis

Creative team
- Writers: Tome
- Artists: Janry

Original publication
- Published in: Spirou magazine
- Issues: 1. 2305 - #2321
- Date of publication: 1982
- Language: French
- ISBN: 2-8001-1036-8

Chronology
- Preceded by: Les faiseurs de silence, 1984
- Followed by: Aventure en Australie, 1985

Virus, written by Tome and drawn by Janry, is the 33rd album of the Spirou et Fantasio series, and the first to come from this creative team, carrying on the series after the work of previous authors. The story was initially serialised in Spirou magazine before being released by Dupuis as a hardcover album in 1984.

== Story ==
An icebreaker has unexpectedly moored in the port of Le Havre where it has been put into quarantine. Suspecting a connection with Isola Red, a research base set in Antarctica and which has been out of touch from some time, Fantasio goes to investigate only to encounter an old enemy, John Helena, nicknamed "the Moray", who has fled the ship.

Looking extremely ill, Helena explains that following his release from prison he got a job working at Isola Red where tests are conducted on some of the deadliest diseases known to man. One day, however, one such disease became loose and the staff at the base all fell ill. The disease appears to be only transmitted by actual physical contact. Helena fled, got aboard a ship bound for Europe and now intends to contact the Count of Champignac whom he believes to be the only man who can save him.

Spirou and Fantasio take him to see the Count. Spip, their pet squirrel, goes with them but, unaware of the situation, bites Héléna and is thus contaminated with the virus.

The Count knows of a cure to the virus affecting Helena and the men at the base but requires an extra toxin to make it effective, and it is only available at the base itself. Spirou and Fantasio set off for the South Pole along with Spip and Helena who are dressed in special outfits which reduce the risks of infection. They arrive at a Russian base where they are given guides and snowcats for the journey to Isola Red. They set off, unaware that some men are tracking them from a distance with the intention of killing them before they reach the base.

Meanwhile, back in Europe, Champignac goes to the Ministry for Research in order to organise a larger-scale rescue operation. However, an adviser at the ministry, Basile de Koch, blocks his attempts to see the minister. At that moment a horde of reporters led by the editor of the monthly current affairs magazine Action bursts in. One of the Action's journalists has been working undercover in de Koch's company which owns the polar base.

Isola Red has actually been used to produce illegal biological weapons and as part of a cover-up de Koch has sent henchmen to kill Spirou and his companions and prevent them from reaching the stricken area. De Koch is arrested thanks to a file put together by the journalist working undercover among his men.

Meanwhile, Spirou and his friends are attacked by de Koch's killers but are saved by Volene, the undercover journalist. They then proceed to Isola Red where they find the toxin needed to complete the cure. The killers also arrive, but Spirou and his friends fight back using the very weaponry they were not supposed to discover. The biological weapons cause those affected to go crazy and engage in disco-like dancing.

At that moment, the Count and the editor of Action also arrive, along with military commandos. The remaining killers thus flee. It appears that the virus does not affect animals — animals used for testing are found to be fine, so it is with great relief that Spip the squirrel is freed from his outfit. Helena and the other patients are cured. Isola Red is then destroyed by bombers and some time later Helena becomes a tour guide, showing the remains of the base off to tourists.

== Themes ==
The story raises the issue of biological weapons, and the influence of top businessmen getting jobs as advisors in government departments. The Cold War was still ongoing — Spirou makes a reference to Soviet spy ships — but the Russian staff of a Polar base play an important part in the rescue operation, thus showing how such events could transcend international conflicts.

== The Marsupilami ==
The Marsupilami had been part of Spirou and Fantasio's adventures since the early 1950s, but was taken out when André Franquin, who created him, would not allow other authors to use him. However, a stuffed toy of the Marsupilami can be seen in Spirou's bedroom.

== Softcover edition ==
Most Franco-Belgian comics are released in hardcover, which makes them expensive. In 2002 Virus was one of several comics to be published by Dupuis as cheaper softcover editions under the label Collection Pirate, a cheeky reference from the publishers about copyright infringements.
