= Spirou à New York =

Spirou et Fantasio #39 Spirou à New York
- Cover of the Belgian edition
- Date: 1987
- Series: Spirou et Fantasio
- Publisher: Dupuis

Creative team
- Writers: Tome
- Artists: Janry

Original publication
- Published in: Spirou magazine
- Issues: 1. 2560 - #2572
- Date of publication: 1987
- Language: French
- ISBN: 2-8001-1518-1

Chronology
- Preceded by: La jeunesse de Spirou, 1987
- Followed by: La frousse aux trousses, 1988

Spirou à New York, written by Tome and drawn by Janry, is the thirty-ninth album of the Spirou et Fantasio series, and the seventh of the authors. The story was serialised in Spirou magazine before being released as a hardcover album in 1987.

== Synopsis ==
In Spirou in New York, the Italian Mafia of New York is dismayed as their criminal activities seem to be cursed and Don Vito "Lucky" Cortizone, the Mafia Godfather, initiates a plan put forward by his second-in-command, Alfredo, to reverse their uncannily rotten luck: to plant a golden key into a Cortizone & Son product, Lucky's Pizza, and rewarding a million dollars to the lucky finders. Spirou and Fantasio who are in an economic slump, are forced to eat an inexpensive dinner, and as Fantasio chokes on a bite of Lucky's Pizza, they become the finders of the golden key. Informed they simply have to travel to New York to collect their prize, The Mafia believe they are receiving a talisman to counteract their misfortune.

When they arrive in New York, they learn the true identity of their hosts and promptly leave without accepting any mafia money, but are unexpectedly attacked by members of the Chinese Triad, the Mafia's chief rivals, and as a result, Spip is abducted. Forced to collaborate with Cortizone in order to rescue Spip, they break into the Triad headquarters and discover the source of The Mafia's constant misfortune, a table with the power to influence good and bad fortune onto the subject of a photo placed onto the field, shaped in the design of a Taijitu, like the yin-yang, which is selected by Cortizone's Triad counterpart, "The Mandarin", who is the leader of the Chinese Triad and hides his deformed face with a hideous and grotesque mask.

Having levelled the balance of fortune, Cortizone and the Mandarin engage in a personal battle over briefcases containing money and a bomb, and following a deceptive swap of suitcases, the two rivals explode above the Hudson River.

Spirou and Fantasio later take the plane back to France, until they jump off the plane to see NYC's soccer games.
