= Spirou et l'aventure =

1948 comic album by Jijé

Spirou et Fantasio (Note: Note: Not listed in Spirou et Fantasio numerical series.) Spirou et l'aventure
- Cover of the Belgian edition
- Date: 1948
- Series: Spirou et Fantasio
- Publisher: Dupuis

Creative team
- Writers: Jijé
- Artists: Jijé

Original publication
- Published in: Spirou magazine
- Issues: 35/43 - #423
- Date of publication: 1943 - 1946
- Language: French

Chronology
- Followed by: Spirou et Fantasio, 1948

Spirou et l'aventure, written and drawn by Jijé, is the first published album containing Spirou et Fantasio adventures. The 6 featured stories were produced during and after World War II, and serialised in the Franco-Belgian comics magazine Le journal de Spirou (Spirou magazine) during this unusual period. They were assembled and published as a hardcover album in 1948 and feature the first appearances of Fantasio.

== Story ==
Contains the stories:

- Le meeting aérien (1943)
- Autour du monde avec le pilote rouge (1944)
- Le voyage dans le temps (1944–45)
- L'enlèvement de Spip (1945)
- La jeep de Fantasio (1945–46)
- Fantasio et le Fantôme (1946)

== Background ==
These stories are considered Jijé's 4th-9th Spirou stories, independent of the work when he functioned as a collaborator on the earliest work by Rob-Vel.

This collection is not regarded among the regular series as it had limited publication, and some of the original plates are thought to be lost.

Two of the stories, La jeep de Fantasio and Fantasio et le Fantôme were later published in the "hors-séries" albums, HS2 Radar le robot and HS4 Fantasio et le fantôme et 4 autres aventures.

== Sources ==
- Joseph Gilain (Jijé) publications in Spirou BDoubliées (in French)
- Les Mémoires de Spirou, Thierry Martens, Jean-Paul Tibéri, Dupuis, 1989. p. 160
