= La ceinture du grand froid =

Spirou et Fantasio #30 La boîte noire
- Cover of the Belgian edition
- Date: 1983
- Series: Spirou et Fantasio
- Publisher: Dupuis

Creative team
- Writers: Cauvin
- Artists: Nic

Original publication
- Published in: Spirou magazine
- Issues: 1. 2276 - #2284
- Date of publication: 1981
- Language: French
- ISBN: 2-8001-0977-7

Chronology
- Preceded by: Des haricots partout, 1980
- Followed by: La boîte noire, 1983

La ceinture du grand froid, by Nic & Cauvin, is the thirtieth album of the Spirou et Fantasio series, and the first of the authors. The story was initially serialised in Spirou magazine, before released as a hardcover album in 1983.

== Story ==
In The Belt of Great Cold, Fantasio made the eccentric purchase of an old ship on which he, Spirou and Spip go on a journey by sea. They end up arriving in a zone in which the climate resembles the North Pole, but the three scientists living the close island explains to them that this "belt of cold" is caused artificially and that the island is fictitious also. Thus, these scientists build an interplanetary vessel in order to flee the Earth, whose great powers try to exploit their genius with fine soldiers. Mercenaries occur, with the orders of the commander Alexander, in order to take them along, but Spirou and Fantasio manage to slow down them sufficiently a long time and the scientists flee in their making believe that they all are died.
