= Spirou et Fantasio (comic book) =

French comic book series

Spirou et Fantasio (Note: Note: Not listed in Spirou et Fantasio numerical series.) Spirou et Fantasio
- Cover of the Belgian edition
- Date: 1948
- Series: Spirou et Fantasio
- Publisher: Dupuis

Creative team
- Writers: Franquin
- Artists: Franquin

Original publication
- Published in: Spirou magazine Almanach Spirou 1947
- Issues: 1. 422 - #521
- Date of publication: 1946 - 1948
- Language: French

Chronology
- Preceded by: Spirou et l'aventure, 1948
- Followed by: Quatre aventures de Spirou et Fantasio, 1950

Spirou et Fantasio, written and drawn by Franquin (except for a few plates by Jijé), is an album that precedes the main Spirou et Fantasio album series. It contains Franquin's first four stories completed between 1946 and 1948, three of which were serialised in Spirou magazine.

== Stories ==
- Fantasio et son tank. Fantasio buys a demobilized tank from an American soldier, and accidentally destroys the neighborhood with it. Spirou and the neighborhood boys help with repairs.
- La maison préfabriquée. Fantasio becomes a salesman of seaside prefabricated houses.
- L'heritage de Spirou. Spirou inherits from a deceased uncle, a strange house with secrets.
- Le Savant fou. (Also called Radar le robot) Spirou joins Fantasio on a journalistic trip, and they see a car with no driver causing panic in town. Following this invention, they meet an insane scientist, who has built a robot with the goal to destroy the world.

== Background ==
The first story, Le Tank, is the very first 12 board "test" story Franquin drew to convince Jijé of his abilities, which was later printed in Spirou almanache 1947 of 1946. The following story, La maison préfabriquée, is the episode Jijé famously had begun in Spirou issue #422, but handed over to Franquin, to continue five boards into the work from issue #427.

Although this album is not regarded as part of the official series and was never republished, its four stories are all printed and available in the hors-série albums, HS1 L'héritage and HS2 Radar le robot.

== Sources ==
- Franquin publications in Spirou BDoubliées (in French)
- Les Mémoires de Spirou Thierry Martens, Jean-Paul Tibéri, Dupuis, 1989. 160 pp.
