= Bruno Gazzotti =

Bruno Gazzotti (born 16 September 1970) is a Belgian bandes dessinées artist.

He has drawn several popular comics, such as Soda and Seuls.

== Childhood ==
Gazzotti's Italian grandfather had been a miner, and his father lived in Belgium from a very early age. Both his parents were sport instructors, and comic enthusiasts. As a child, Gazzotti was himself very interested in Franco-Belgian comics such as Tintin. In 1988, he was hired by Spirou's editor in chief Patrick Pinchart, who, after seeing the portfolio, commissioned a few illustrations. He had previously studied at Institut Saint Luc in Liège.

== Early career ==
Shortly after, he assisted artist Janry on Le petit Spirou (from the 20th strip onwards ), with writer Tome. With Tome, he later became the artist for a semi-realistic series about a New York policeman, Soda, in 1989.

== 2000 onwards ==
Gazzotti continued drawing Soda until 2005, with "Apocalypse Code", the series' 12th album. This was despite him saying, shortly after the comic's release, "I should normally continue the series, as we have found an agreement to continue that satisfies everyone." The comic was later continued by Tome and Dan Verlinden.

In January 2006, he and writer Fabien Vehlmann released the first episode of a new saga, Seuls, about a group of teenagers who try surviving in a mysterious world where adults have disappeared. It was very successfully both commercially and critically.

== Prizes ==
2007: "Prix jeunesse du festival d'Angouleme"
