= La boîte noire =

Spirou et Fantasio #31 La boîte noire
- Cover of the Belgian edition
- Date: 1983
- Series: Spirou et Fantasio
- Publisher: Dupuis

Creative team
- Writers: Cauvin
- Artists: Nic

Original publication
- Published in: Spirou magazine
- Issues: 1. 2322 - #2343
- Date of publication: 1982
- Language: French
- ISBN: 2-8001-0994-7

Chronology
- Preceded by: La ceinture du grand froid, 1983
- Followed by: Les faiseurs de silence, 1984

La boîte noire, by Nic (Broca) & Cauvin, is the thirty-first album of the Spirou et Fantasio series, and the second of the authors. The story was initially serialised in Spirou magazine, before released as a hardcover album in 1983.

== Story ==
In The Black Box, Fantasio opened the mysterious box that Jefferson, Boris and Karl left them (see La ceinture du grand froid), and discovers plans within for thousands of inventions. When he tests one in company of Spirou, it draws the attention of Commander Alexander, who retrieves the box with Kalloway. Spirou must exchange the black box with them for Fantasio's release. Thanks to Jefferson, they discover that the gangsters are hiding in a stronghold in the Sahara, where they are protected by natives. Spirou and Fantasio travel there and succeed in taking the box back from Alexander and Kalloway, while making themselves pass for dead.
