= Les faiseurs de silence =

Spirou et Fantasio #32 Les faiseurs de silence
- Cover of the Belgian edition
- Date: 1984
- Series: Spirou et Fantasio
- Publisher: Dupuis

Creative team
- Writers: Cauvin
- Artists: Nic

Original publication
- Published in: Spirou magazine
- Issues: 1. ? - #?
- Date of publication: ?
- Language: French
- ISBN: 2-8001-1023-6

Chronology
- Preceded by: La boîte noire, 1983
- Followed by: Virus, 1984

Les faiseurs de silence, by Nic & Cauvin, is the thirty-second album of the Spirou et Fantasio series, and the third of the authors. The story was initially serialised in Spirou magazine before released as a hardcover album in 1984.

== Story ==
In The Silence Makers, Fantasio asks Spirou to join him. Spirou understands quickly that he again used the block box (of the two preceding albums). It discovers its invention: the aspison, which with the capacity to swallow any sound around the zone where it is used. Alas, it involves problems rather quickly and their two enemies, the commander Alexander and his Kalloway assistant, find themselves on their traces. They seize the machine and make use of it to make hold-ups, however, caught up with by their owner, they must find the block box and go to Fantasio, where they discover with horror that the machine must be discharged after a certain number of use of the absorptive sounds, like a vacuum cleaner. Taken of panic by seeing the level of filling of the machine, they flee by leaving it on the spot. While returning, Spirou and Fantasio discover it and decide to release it in the ocean, so that nobody can press on the button of unloading.
