= Le Tronchet =

Le Tronchet refers to two communes in France:

- Le Tronchet, Ille-et-Vilaine
- Le Tronchet, Sarthe

== See also ==
- Tronchet, a surname
