= Spirou & Fantasio =

Franco-Belgian comics series

- Some of the main characters of Spirou & Fantasio, from the album Le gorille a bonne mine. From left to right: the Marsupilami, Spirou, Fantasio, and the squirrel Spip.

Publication information
- Publisher: Dupuis (French), usually first in the magazine Spirou, then in albums Cinebook Ltd (English)
- Publication date: 1938–present
- Main character(s): Spirou; Fantasio; Spip

Creative team
- Created by: Robert Velter
- Written by: Joseph (Jijé) Gillain (1940–50); André Franquin (1947–69); Jean-Claude Fournier (1969–79); Raoul Cauvin (1983–84); Philippe (Tome) Vandevelde (1984–98); Jean-David Morvan (1998–2009); Fabien Vehlmann (2009-2017); Sophie Guerrive & Benjamin Abitan (2022-)
- Artists: Joseph (Jijé) Gillain (1940–50); André Franquin (1947–69); Fournier (1969–79); Nicolas Broca (1979–84); Jean-Richard (Janry) Geurts (1984–98); José Luis Munuera (1998–2009); Yoann Chivard (2009–2017); Olivier Schwartz (2022-)

Spirou & Fantasio (French: Spirou et Fantasio), commonly shortened to Spirou, is one of the most popular classic Franco-Belgian comics. The series, which has been running since 1938, shares many characteristics with other European humorous adventure comics like The Adventures of Tintin, Lucky Luke, and Asterix. It has been written and drawn by a succession of artists.

Spirou and Fantasio are the series' main characters, two adventurous journalists who run into fantastic adventures, aided by Spirou's pet squirrel Spip and their inventor friend, the Count of Champignac.

== History ==
=== Origins of Spirou ===
Rob-Vel's Spirou

The comic strip was originally created by Rob-Vel for the launch of Le Journal de Spirou (Spirou magazine) on April 21, 1938, and published by Éditions Dupuis. The main character was originally an elevator (lift) operator (in French: un groom) for the Moustique Hotel (in reference to the publisher's chief magazine, Le Moustique), and remained dressed in his red bellhop uniform for a long time after the occupation was dropped. Spirou (the name means 'squirrel' (lit.) and 'mischievous' (fig.) in Walloon) has a pet squirrel called Spip, the series' first supporting character, who was introduced on June 8, 1939, in the story arc titled L'Héritage de Bill Money and liberated in the following week's issue, remaining a presence in all Spirou stories since.

Spip's liberation, June 15, 1939

Adding to the difficulties of magazine publication that came with the outbreak of World War II, Velter, a French national, joined the army effort, and his wife Blanche Dumoulin, using the pen name Davine, continued the work on the Spirou strip, with the aid of the young Belgian artist Luc Lafnet. Spirou became the property of the publisher Dupuis (atypical in France and Belgium where most comic characters are owned by their creator(s)), who bought the character from Rob-Vel in 1943, and since then the series has belonged to no specific author. The title has therefore subsequently been passed on to several different artists and writers.

The first success came in 1943 when Joseph Gillain, known by the pen name Jijé, was given charge of the character. In 1944 Jijé introduced a new character, Fantasio, who would become Spirou's best friend and co-adventurer. Holding many artistic commitments at Spirou magazine, Jijé sought to delegate much of his work, and in 1946 he handed the series to his understudy, the young André Franquin, in the middle of the production of the story Spirou et la maison préfabriquée.

=== Franquin's Spirou ===
Franquin developed the strip from single gags and short serials into long adventures with complex plots and is usually considered the definitive author of the strip. He introduced a large gallery of recurring characters, notably the Count de Champignac, an elderly scientist and inventor; the buffoonish mad scientist Zorglub; Fantasio's cousin and aspiring dictator Zantafio; and the journalist Seccotine, a rare instance of a major female character in Franco-Belgian comics of this period.

Spirou et les héritiers, 1952, by Franquin

One Franquin creation that went on to develop a life of its own was the Marsupilami, a fictional monkey-like creature with a tremendously long prehensile tail. The Marsupilami appears in the majority of the Franquin stories, starting in 1952 with Spirou et les héritiers. In the series, it is adopted by the duo and follows them everywhere they go. Marsupilamis in the wild take centre stage briefly in Le nid des Marsupilamis (1957) which presents Seccotine's documentary featuring a family in their natural habitat, the jungles of the fictitious South American state Palombia.

Starting with Le prisonnier du Bouddha (1959), Franquin began to work with Greg (writing) and Jidéhem (backgrounds). As in some of his later series (Bruno Brazil, Bernard Prince), Greg staged his stories in a realistic geopolitical context. Le prisonnier du Bouddha is set in mainland China, with veiled references made to the Cold War. As for QRN sur Bretzelburg, it takes place in two imaginary European countries which bring to mind pre-reunification Germany. Lastly, it is with Greg that Franquin created the famed villain Zorglub in the diptych of Z comme Zorglub and L'ombre du Z.

However, as Franquin grew tired of Spirou, his other major character Gaston began to take precedence in his work, and following the controversial Panade à Champignac, the series passed on to a then-unknown young cartoonist, Jean-Claude Fournier, in 1969. One side effect of this is that the Marsupilami would only appear in one last story, Le faiseur d'or. This is because Franquin decided to retain the rights to that character; all the other characters remained the property of the publisher. Starting with Du glucose pour Noémie, there would be no more appearances of the Marsupilami in Spirou et Fantasio, with the exception of a few discreet references. Only in the 1980s did the Marsupilami reappear in its own series, and later a television cartoon and video game.

=== A long transition ===
Fournier authored nine books in the series, which saw Spirou evolve into a more modern character. Where Franquin's stories tended to be politically neutral (in his later works, notably Idées noires, he would champion pacifist and environmental views), Fournier's stint on Spirou addressed such hot topics (for the 1970s) as nuclear energy (L'Ankou), drug-funded dictatorships (Kodo le tyran) and Duvalier-style repression (Tora Torapa).

Fournier introduced some new characters such as Ororéa, a beautiful girl reporter with whom Fantasio was madly in love (in contrast with his dislike of Seccotine); Itoh Kata, a Japanese magician; and an occult SPECTRE-like criminal organisation known as The Triangle. None of these were reused by later artists until some thirty years later when Itoh Kata appeared in Morvan and Munuera's Spirou et Fantasio à Tokyo.

However, at the end of the 1970s Fournier's pace began to slow down and the publisher, Dupuis, sought new authors to replace him. For a time, three separate teams worked on concurrent stories. Nic Broca (art) and Raoul Cauvin (writing) took on Fournier's lead without adding much to the characters. Their primary addition to the Spirou universe, namely the "Black box", a device that annihilates sound, is in fact an acknowledged rehash from an early Sophie story by Jidéhem (La bulle du silence). Strangely, the authors were not allowed by the publisher to use any of the side characters and because of this, the duo's three stories read somewhat like a parenthesis in the series.

=== Yves Chaland's case ===
Yves Chaland proposed a far more radical make-over. His (very short) stint on Spirou is an ironic re-staging of the strip as it was in the 40s. This homage to Jijé and early Franquin was seen at the time as too sophisticated for the mainstream readership. It was pre-published in 1982 in Spirou magazine, n°2297 to n°2318, printed in two-colour, but was interrupted before it was completed. This unfinished story was first collected in an unofficial album in 1984, À la recherche de Bocongo, and then, legally, under the name of Cœurs d'acier (Champaka editor, 1990). This last edition includes the original strips, and a text by Yann Le Pennetier, illustrated by Chaland, that finishes the interrupted story.

=== Tome and Janry – the Dynamic Duo ===
Vito la Déveine, 1991, by Tome & Janry

It was the team of Tome (writing) and Janry (art) which was to find lasting success with Spirou, both in terms of sales and critical appeal. Graphically, the authors' work was seen as a modern homage to Franquin's classic work, while their plots involved such modern topics as biotech (Virus), robotics (Qui arrêtera Cyanure?), and even time travel (the diptych of L'horloger de la comète and Le réveil du Z, featuring future descendants of the Count and Zorglub). Their position as the official Spirou authors made them the flagship team to a whole new school of young, like-minded artists, such as Didier Conrad, Bernard Hislaire, or Frank Le Gall, who had illustrious careers of their own. For a time, Spirou also acted as a side character in Frank Pé's short-lived absurd humor strip L'Élan (originally published in the weekly Spirou magazine).

With La jeunesse de Spirou (1987), Tome and Janry set out to imagine Spirou's youth. This idea was later developed into a spin-off series, Le Petit Spirou ("Young Spirou"), which details the antics of the character as an elementary school boy. A lot of the center of gags center around the character's interest in the opposite sex. It is generally acknowledged, however, that the Petit Spirou has little in common, psychologically speaking, with the adult character.

A new villain, the unlucky Mafia boss Vito "Lucky" Cortizone, based on the character Vito Corleone from The Godfather movies, was introduced in Spirou à New York, while Spirou à Moscou (1990) sees Spirou and Fantasio pay their first visit to the USSR, just as it was about to collapse (the country was dissolved in 1991).

In Machine qui rêve (1998), Tome and Janry tried to once again renew the series with a more mature storyline (wounded hero, love relationships, etc.), coupled with a more realistic graphic style. This sudden shift into a darker tone shocked many readers, although its seeds were apparent in previous Spirou albums and in other series by the same authors (Soda, Berceuse assassine). While many considered the change in tone to be courageous and laudable, there was some concern that Spirou lost much of its point when presented as a "realistic" character. At any rate, the controversy caused Tome and Janry to concentrate on Le Petit Spirou, and stop making albums in the main series.

=== Spirou in the 21st century ===
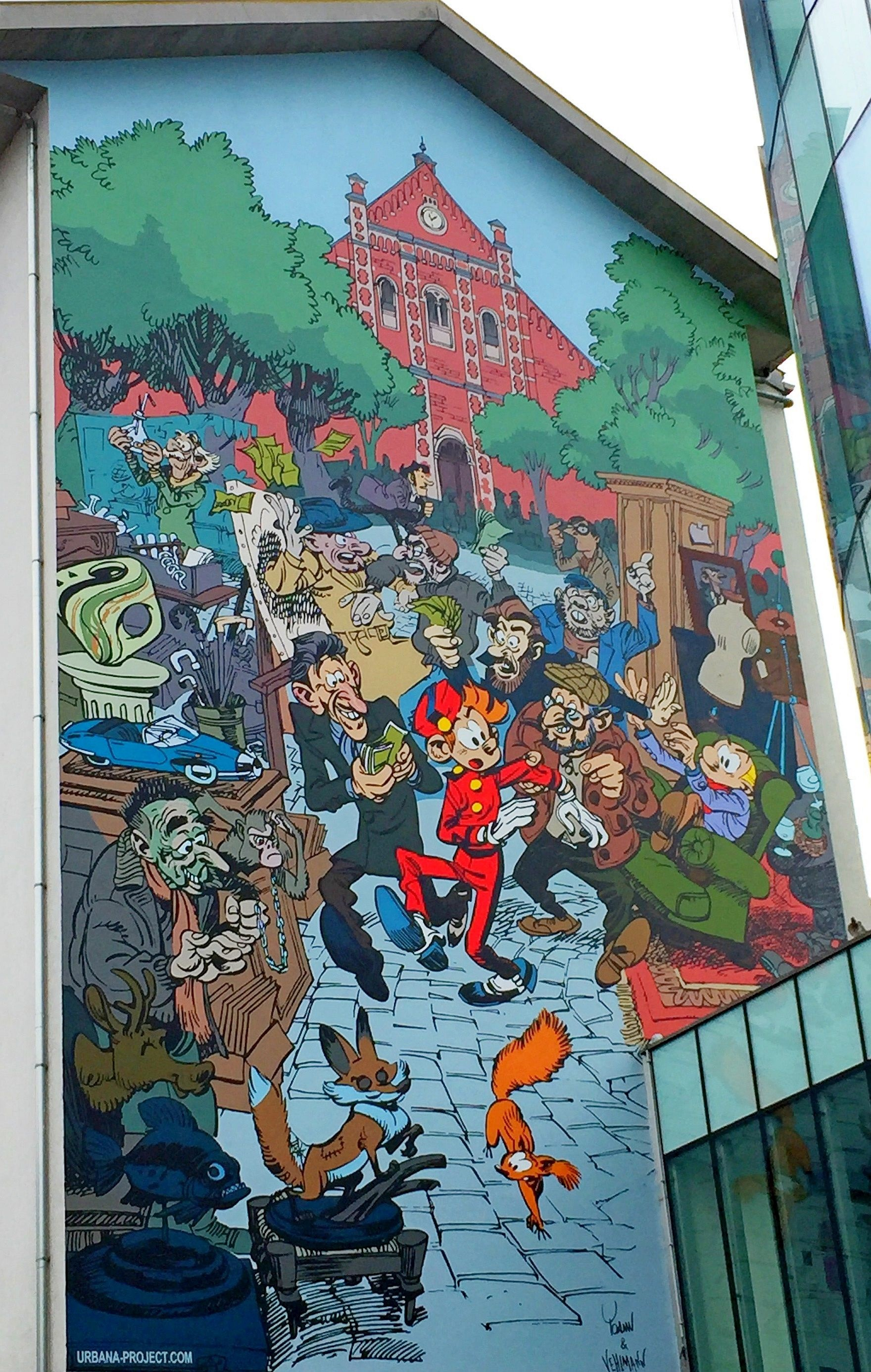
Spirou mural in Brussels.

==== Morvan and Munuera ====
After a six-year break, which only saw the publication of L'accélérateur atomique, a Spirou spoof by Lewis Trondheim not included in the official series (but which received Dupuis' approval), the series went back to a more classical storytelling mode with seasoned cartoonists Jean-David Morvan (writing) and José-Luis Munuera (art). The latter kept close to the spirit of Franquin's graphical style, while bringing its own touch of manga-inspired modernism. Morvan and Munuera's Spirou is partly remarkable in that it uses background elements and secondary characters from the whole history of the title, and not just from Franquin's period.

The duo's third album, Spirou et Fantasio à Tokyo was released 20 September 2006. Spirou and Fantasio uncover the story of two children with telekinetic powers (similarly to the manga Akira) that are forced to construct an Edo and Meiji period theme park. Dupuis has also released as Spirou et Fantasio 49Z a manga story by Hiroyuki Oshima after an idea by Morvan. This story tells Spirou's adolescence as a bellhop in a five-star Tokyo hotel.

Due to a significant decline in sales, Dupuis decided to cease Morvan and Munuera work in Spirou in January 2007. However, they were allowed to complete one last album, Aux sources du Z, which was released 5 November 2008, with the help of scenarist Yann.

==== Yoann and Vehlmann ====
In January 2009, it was announced in Spirou magazine #3694 that Morvan and Munuera would be succeeded by Fabien Vehlmann and Yoann, who had together created the first volume of Une aventure de Spirou et Fantasio par.... Their first album in the regular series was announced for October 2009, but was later pushed back to September 3, 2010, and is named Alerte aux zorkons. Their last album was La colère du Marsupilami, published in 2016.

In 2018, Yoann and Vehlmann launched a spin-off series with Spirou as a superhero – Supergroom (French for 'Superbellhop') – and have since then been focusing on this version of the character.

==== Guerrive, Abitan & Schwartz ====
In 2022, Sophie Guerrive and Benjamin Abitan (writers) and Olivier Schwartz (artist) had their first Spirou album (La Mort de Spirou) published.

==== Le Spirou de... ====
In 2006, Dupuis launched a second series of one-off volumes by various authors, under the name Une aventure de Spirou et Fantasio par... ('A Spirou and Fantasio adventure by...'). It has subsequently been renamed Le Spirou de... ('The Spirou story by...')

The first volume, Les géants pétrifiés by Fabien Vehlmann and Yoann, had a modern storyline and art, not dissimilar in spirit to Morvan and Munuera's work. The second volume, Les marais du temps, by Frank Le Gall, is drawn in a more classic style not dissimilar to The Adventures of Tintin and Théodore Poussin, Le Gall's own comic series. The third, Le tombeau des Champignac, by Yann and Fabrice Tarrin, is a slightly modernized homage to Franquin's classic period. The fourth, Journal d'un ingénu, by Emile Bravo, is a novelistic homage to the original Rob-Vel and Jijé's universes and stories, and was released to critical acclaim, being awarded at the Angoulême festival. The fifth, Le groom vert-de-gris by Yann and Olivier Schwartz, is based on one of Yann's old scripts from the 1980s originally intended to have been drawn by Chaland, while the editor rejected it. Yann picked up the artist Schwartz, working in a similar style, to complete the story. The story takes place among the resistance movement in the Nazi-occupied Belgium. Unlike traditional Spirou stories, but similar to other works by Yann, the story features rather much dark humour and political satire. It was released once again to some acclaim but also attracted controversy for its cavalier approach to sensitive issues. The sixth album, Panique en Atlantique, authored by Lewis Trondheim and Fabrice Parme, was released on April 16, 2010.

A One-Shot album from 2017, Il s'appelait Ptirou (His Name Was Ptirou), written by Yves Sente and illustrated by Laurent Verron, which was a fictional "real-life" story of a boy that became the inspiration for Spirou, was repurposed and reissued as the first volume of a new spin-off series, Mademoiselle J, centered around a girl named Juliette, Ptirou's love interest from Il s'appelait Ptirou. To date, this series has two volumes.

==== Les aventures de Spirou et Fantasio Classique ====
In 2024, a new series of Spirou et Fantasio albums, dubbed Les aventures de Spirou et Fantasio Classique (The Adventures of Spirou & Fantasio Classic), premiered with its debut album, La Baie des cochons (The Bay of Pigs, which takes place during the Bay of Pigs Invasion), written by Clément Lemoine & Michaël Baril, and illustrated by Elric. These new adventures are styled after the Franquin run of the series, especially in art style.

== Characters ==
Main and recurring Spirou et Fantasio characters:

- Spirou – the main character. An investigative reporter with a strong sense of justice.
- Fantasio – Spirou's best friend and co-adventurer, a reporter with a hot temper.
- Spip – Spirou's grouchy pet squirrel.
- The Marsupilami – a very unusual creature captured in a South American jungle by Spirou and Fantasio. Marsupilami is the name of the species, and the creature never acquired an individual name. Often referred to as "the little animal" even though it can terrorise anything and anyone.
- Count of Champignac – Spirou and Fantasio's eccentric scientist friend.
- The Mayor of Champignac – petty, pompous, ineffectual and two-faced, he is mostly memorable for his trademark speeches in which he piles up mixed metaphors sky-high.
- Seccotine – their fellow reporter, a friend and rival at the same time. Gets on Fantasio's nerves, but a priceless ally.
- Gaston Lagaffe – the main source of disaster and gags at the Spirou magazine offices. While he is the hero of his own series, he makes a few guest appearances in Spirou stories.
- Ororéa – another brave female reporter, of Polynesian descent.
- Itoh Kata – a Japanese scientist and magician.
- Zorglub – a mad scientist as well as a former colleague of the Count of Champignac from university. Originally a foe upon his first appearance, he boasts that he could take over the world, but really wants to be recognised as the greatest scientist of all time. He is later rehabilitated and becomes a friend of the protagonists. However, his ego is never shot down as more recent albums show.

=== Enemies ===
- Zantafio – Fantasio's evil cousin.
- John Helena la Murène (the moray) – a brutal maritime criminal.
- Don Vito "Lucky" Cortizone – New York mafia boss, father of a dangerous woman called Luna.
- Cyanure, a gynoid.

== Albums ==
This list includes French titles, their English translation, and the first year of publication

=== Jijé ===
- Spirou et l'aventure, 1948, featuring:
  - Le meeting aérien (The Aerial Meeting), 1943
  - Autour du monde avec le pilote rouge (Around the World with the Red Pilot), 1944
  - Le voyage dans le temps (The Voyage in Time), 1944–45
  - L'enlèvement de Spip (The Abduction of Spip), 1945
  - La jeep de Fantasio (Fantasio's Jeep), 1945–46. Also in hors-séries H2.
  - Fantasio et le Fantôme (Fantasio and the Ghost), 1946. Also in hors-séries H4

=== André Franquin ===
- Spirou et Fantasio, 1948, featuring:
  - Fantasio et le tank (Fantasio and his Tank), 1946. Also in hors-séries H1.
  - Les Maisons préfabriquées (The Prefabricated Houses), 1946. Also in hors-séries H2.
  - L'Héritage (The inheritance of Spirou), 1946. Also in hors-séries H1.
  - Le Savant fou (The Mad Genius), 1947–48. Also in hors-séries H2 as Radar le Robot.
- 1. Quatre aventures de Spirou et Fantasio (Four Adventures of Spirou and Fantasio), 1950, featuring:
  - Les plans du robot (Spirou and the Robot's Plans), 1948
  - Spirou sur le ring (Spirou in the Ring), 1948
  - Spirou fait du cheval (Spirou rides a horse), 1949
  - Spirou chez les Pygmées (Spirou meets the Pygmees), 1949
- 2. Il y a un sorcier à Champignac (There is a Sorcerer in Champignac), 1951, written by Henri Gillain. First appearance of the Mayor and the Count of Champignac.
- 3. Les chapeaux noirs (The Black Hats), 1952; followed by:
  - Comme une mouche au plafond (Like a Fly on the Ceiling) by Jijé.
  - Spirou et les hommes-grenouilles (Spirou and the Frogmen) by Jijé.
  - Mystère à la frontière (Mystery at the Frontier)
- 4. Spirou et les héritiers (Spirou and the Heirs), 1952. First appearance of Zantafio and the Marsupilami.
- 5. Les voleurs du Marsupilami (The Marsupilami Robbers), 1952; after an idea by Jo Almo. This story begins when Spirou et les héritiers ends.
- 6. La corne de rhinocéros (The Rhinoceros Horn), 1953. First appearance of Seccotine and Turbot-Rhino I.
- 7. Le dictateur et le champignon (The Dictator and the Mushroom), 1953; after an idea by Maurice Rosy.
- 8. La mauvaise tête (The Wrong Head), 1954
- 9. Le repaire de la murène (The Moray's Hideout), 1955. First appearance of John Helena, alias "The Moray".
- 10. Les pirates du silence (Pirates of Silence), 1956; with Maurice Rosy (writing) and Will (backgrounds).
  - also including La Quick Super, 1956
- 11. Le gorille a bonne mine (Gorilla's in Good Shape), 1956
  - also including Vacances sans histoires (Uneventful Holidays). Second cameo of Gaston Lagaffe.
- 12. Le nid des Marsupilamis (The Marsupilamis' Nest), 1957
  - also including La foire aux gangsters (Gangsters at the Fair)
- 13. Le voyageur du Mésozoïque (The Traveller from the Mesozoic, 1957) First actual cameo of Gaston Lagaffe.
  - also including La peur au bout du fil (Fear at the End of the Line, 1959; with Greg (writing) and Jidéhem (backgrounds).
- 14. Le prisonnier du Bouddha (The prisoner of the Buddha), 1959; with Greg (writing) and Jidéhem (backgrounds).
- 15. Z comme Zorglub (Z is for Zorglub), 1960; with Greg (writing) and Jidéhem (backgrounds). First appearance of Zorglub. Part one of two.
- 16. L'ombre du Z (The Shadow of Z), 1960; with Greg (writing) and Jidéhem (backgrounds). Part two of two.
- 17. Spirou et les hommes-bulles (Spirou and the Bubble Men), 1959
  - also including Les petits formats (The Small Formats), 1960; both with Jean Roba (art). These stories, along with Tembo Tabou, first appeared in a newspaper, Le Parisien Libéré.
- 18. QRN sur Bretzelburg (Q.R.N. over Bretzelburg), 1963; with Greg (writing) and Jidéhem (backgrounds)). A longer version was published in 1987 in a limited printing.
- 19. Panade à Champignac (Babysitting in Champignac), 1968; with Peyo and Gos (writing).
  - also including Bravo les Brothers (Hurray for the Brothers), 1967; with Jidéhem (backgrounds).
- 24. Tembo Tabou, 1968, with Roba (art); followed by short stories

=== Jean-Claude Fournier ===
- 20. Le faiseur d'or (The gold maker, 1970). Last appearance of the Marsupilami.
- 21. Du glucose pour Noémie (Glucose for Noémie, 1971)
- 22. L'abbaye truquée (The Disguised Abbey, 1972)
- 23. Tora Torapa (1973)
- 25. Le gri-gri du Niokolo-Koba (The gris-gris of Niokolo-Koba, 1974)
- 26. Du cidre pour les étoiles (Cider for the Stars, 1977)
- 27. L'Ankou (The Ankou, 1978)
- 28. Kodo le tyran (Kodo the Tyrant, 1979). Part one of two.
- 29. Des haricots partout (Beans Everywhere, 1980). Part two of two.

=== Nic & Cauvin ===
- 30. La ceinture du grand froid (The great cold belt, 1983)
- 31. La boîte noire (The Black Box, 1983)
- 32. Les faiseurs de silence (The silence makers, 1984)

=== Tome & Janry ===
- 33. Virus (1984)
- 34. Aventure en Australie (Adventure Down Under, 1985)
- 35. Qui arrêtera Cyanure? (Who Will Stop Cyanide?, 1985)
- 36. L'horloger de la comète (The Clockmaker and the Comet, 1986). Part one of two.
- 37. Le réveil du Z (The Z Rises Again, 1986). Part two of two.
- 38. La jeunesse de Spirou (Spirou's Youth, 1987)
- 39. Spirou à New-York (Spirou & Fantasio in New York, 1987). First appearance of Don Vito "Lucky" Cortizone.
- 40. La frousse aux trousses (Running Scared, 1988). Part one of two.
- 41. La vallée des bannis (Valley of the Exiles, 1989). Part two of two.
- 42. Spirou à Moscou (Spirou & Fantasio in Moscow, 1990)
- 43. Vito la Déveine (Tough Luck Vito, 1991)
- 44. Le rayon noir (The Black Ray, 1993)
- 45. Luna fatale (1995)
- 46. Machine qui rêve (Machine that Dreams, 1998)

=== Morvan & Munuera ===
- 47. Paris-sous-Seine (Paris-under-Seine, 2004)
- 48. L'homme qui ne voulait pas mourir (The Man Who Didn't Want To Die, 2005)
- 49. Spirou et Fantasio à Tokyo (Spirou and Fantasio in Tokyo, released on September 20, 2006)
- 49Z. Spirou et Fantasio, le 49Z – short Spirou manga by Hiroyuki Oshima
- 50. Aux sources du Z (The Origins of the Z, released on November 5, 2008)

=== Yoann & Vehlmann ===
- 51. Alerte aux Zorkons (Attack of the Zordolts, released on September 3, 2010)
- 52. La Face cachée du Z (The Dark Side of the Z, released on October 21, 2011)
- 53. Dans les griffes de la vipère (In the Claws of the Viper, released on January 11, 2013)
- 54. Le groom de Sniper Alley (The Sniper Alley Bellhop, released on November 21, 2014)
- 55. La Colère du Marsupilami (The Wrath of the Marsupilami, released on December 2, 2016)

=== Guerrive, Abitan & Schwartz ===
- 56. La Mort de Spirou (The Death of Spirou, released on August 28, 2022)
- 57. La Mémoire du futur (The Memory of the Future, released on February 2, 2024)

=== Special issues (hors-séries) ===
- 1. L'Héritage (The inheritance). Featuring:
  - Fantasio et son Tank (Fantasio and his tank, 1946, Franquin)
  - L'Héritage (1946, Franquin)
- 2. Radar le robot (Radar the robot). Featuring:
  - La maison préfabriquée (The prefabricated house, 1946, Jijé & Franquin)
  - Radar le robot (1947, Franquin)
  - Le Homard (The lobster, 1957, Franquin)
- 3. La voix sans maître et 5 autres aventures (The voice without owner and 5 other adventures). Featuring stories by:
  - Rob-Vel: La naissance de Spirou (Spirou's birth, 1938); Spirou et la puce (Spirou and the flea, 1943)
  - Franquin: Fantasio et le siphon (Fantasio and the siphon, 1957)
  - Nic: Le fantacoptère solaire (The solar fantacopter, 1980)
  - Tome & Janry: La voix sans maître (1981); La menace (The menace, 1982); La Tirelire est là (The money box is there, 1984); Une semaine de Spirou et Fantasio (A week of Spirou and Fantasio, 2001)
- 4. Fantasio et le fantôme et 4 autres aventures (Fantasio and the ghost and other 4 adventures). Featuring stories by:
  - Jijé: Fantasio et le fantôme (1946)
  - Franquin: La Zorglumobile (The Zorgumovil, 1976); Noël dans la brousse (Christmas in the bush, 1949); Fantasio et les pantins téléguidés (Fantasio and the remote-controlled skates, 1957)
  - Yves Chaland: Cœurs d'acier (Steel Hearts, 1982)
  - Fournier: Vacances à Brocéliande (Holidays at Broceliland, 1973); Joyeuses Pâques, Papa! (Happy Easter, dad!, 1971)

=== One-shots: Une aventure de Spirou et Fantasio par... ===
- 1. Les géants pétrifiés (The Petrified Giants, 2006, by Fabien Vehlmann (story) and Yoann (art))
- 2. Les marais du temps (The Marshlands of Time, 2007, by Frank Le Gall)
- 3. Le tombeau des Champignac (The Tomb of the Champignacs, 2007, by Yann (story) and Fabrice Tarrin (art))
- 4. Spirou, le journal d'un ingénu (Spirou, An Ingenuous [Boy]'s Diary, 2008, by Emile Bravo)
- 5. Le Groom Vert-de-Gris (The Verdigris Groom, 2009, by Yann (story) and Schwartz (art))
- 6. Panique en Atlantique (Panic in the Atlantic, 2010, by Lewis Trondheim (story) and Fabrice Parme (art))
- 7. La Femme léopard (The Leopard Woman, 2014, by Yann (story) and Schwartz (art))
- 8. La Grosse Tête (The Big Head, 2015, by Makyo & Toldac (story) and Tehem (art))
- 9. Fantasio se marie (Fantasio is Getting Married, 2016, by Benoît Feroumont)
- 10. La Lumière de Bornéo (The Light of Borneo, 2016, by Zidrou (story) and Frank Pé (art))
- 11. Le Maître des Hosties Noires (The Master of the Black Hosts, 2017, by Yann (story) and Schwartz (art))
- 12. Fondation Z (Foundation Z, 2018, by Denis-Pierre Filippi (story) and Fabrice Lebeault (art))
- 13. Spirou, l'espoir malgré tout (Première partie) (Spirou, Hope Against All Odds (Part 1), 2018, by Emile Bravo)
- 14. Spirou, l'espoir malgré tout (Deuxième partie: Un peu plus loin vers l'horreur) (Spirou, Hope Against All Odds (Part 2: A Little Further Into the Horror), 2019, by Emile Bravo)
- 15. Spirou à Berlin (Spirou in Berlin, 2019, by Flix)
- 16. Spirou chez les soviets (Spirou Among the Soviets, 2020, by Fred Neidhardt (story) and Fabrice Tarrin (art))
- 17. Pacific Palace (2020, by Christian Durieux)
- 18. Spirou, l'espoir malgré tout (Tome 3: Un départ vers la fin) (Spirou, Hope Against All Odds (Part 3: A Departure Towards the End), 2021, by Emile Bravo)
- 19. Spirou, l'espoir malgré tout (Tome 4: Une fin et un nouveau départ) (Spirou, Hope Against All Odds (Part 4: An Ending and a New Beginning), 2022, by Emile Bravo)
- 20. Spirou chez les fous (Spirou Among the Lunatics, 2022, by Jul (story) and Libon (art))
- 21. Spirou et la Gorgone bleue (Spirou and the Blue Gorgon, 2023, by Yann (story) and Dany (art)). Withdrawn from circulation in November 2024 after criticism, spread from TikTok, alleging racist and sexist imagery.

== Translations ==
The strip has been translated to several languages, among them Spanish, Portuguese, English, Japanese, German, Bahasa Indonesia, Vietnamese, Turkish, Italian, Dutch, Finnish, Scandinavian languages, Serbo-Croatian, Galician, Catalan, Icelandic and Arabic.

One book, number 15, was translated into English, by Fantasy Flight Publishing in 1995. This edition is out of print. Book 16 was partially translated but never published.

In 1960, Le nid des Marsupilamis was printed in the weekly British boys' magazine Knockout, under the title Dickie and Birdbath Watch the Woggle. In that early localization, Spirou was called "Dickie," Fantasio was "Birdbath," Seccotine was "Cousin Constance," the Marsupilami was "the Woggle," and the female Marsupilami was "the Wiggle."

Egmont has printed and released English translations of Spirou in 2007 in India through its Indian subsidiary (Euro Books). So far, albums number 1–11 and 14 have been translated.

Cinebook has started publishing the series in October 2009. Books released so far:

34. Spirou & Fantasio: Adventure Down Under (Aventure en Australie), 2009, ISBN 978-1-84918-011-5
39. Spirou & Fantasio in New York, 2010, ISBN 978-1-84918-054-2
40. Spirou & Fantasio: Running Scared, 2012, ISBN 978-1-84918-116-7
41. Spirou & Fantasio: Valley of the Exiles, 2013, ISBN 978-1-84918-157-0
05. The Marsupilami Thieves, 2013, ISBN 978-1-84918-167-9
42. Spirou & Fantasio in Moscow, 2014, ISBN 978-1-84918-193-8
06. The Rhinoceros' Horn, 2014, ISBN 978-1-84918-224-9
43. Tough Luck Vito, 2015, ISBN 978-1-84918-248-5
07. The Dictator and the Mushroom, 2015, ISBN 978-1-84918-267-6
33. Virus, 2016, ISBN 978-1-84918-297-3
08. The Wrong Head, 2016, ISBN 978-1-849183-130
35. Who Will Stop Cyanide?, 2017, ISBN 978-1-84918-355-0
15. Z is for Zorglub, 2017, ISBN 978-1-84918-362-8
36. The Clockmaker and the Comet, 2018, ISBN 978-1-84918-404-5
16. Shadow of the Z, 2018 ISBN 978-1-84918-419-9
37. The Z Rises Again, 2019 ISBN 978-1-84918-441-0
12. The Marsupilamis' Nest, 2020 ISBN 978-1-84918-5-332
51. Attack of the Zordolts, 2021 ISBN 978-1800440227
13. The Visitor from the Mesozoic, 2022 ISBN 978-1800440661
52. The Dark Side of the Z, 2023 ISBN 9781800441033
14. The Prisoner of the Buddha, 2024 ISBN 9781800441354

Concurrently, Europe Comics has published translations of the One-Shot albums, available in digital form. Books released so far:

12. His Name Was Ptirou, published April 18, 2018, ASIN B07CPTFFH3
4. Spirou: The Diary of a Naive Young Man, published November 21, 2018, ASIN B07K8LLM6D
16. Spirou in Berlin, published March 20, 2019, ASIN B07NY7B3QR
14. Spirou – Hope Against All Odds: Part 1, published March 18, 2020, ASIN B0859LLWGT
15. Spirou – Hope Against All Odds: Part 2, published June 17, 2020, ASIN B08B6C53ZV

== In other media ==
The popularity of the series has led to an adaptation of the characters into different media.

=== Radio ===
On February 25, 1961, and October 16, 1963, two radio audio play adaptations were broadcast on the RTBF radio channel. The stories were based on Le Dictateur de Champignon and Les Robinsons du Rail, with participation of Yvan Delporte and André Franquin.

=== Animation ===
Two TV cartoon series has been produced, the first, Spirou, consisting of 52 episodes originally aired between 1993 and 1994, and the second, Les Nouvelles Aventures de Spirou et Fantasio consisting of 39 episodes originally aired between 2006 and 2009.

=== Video Games ===
Two video games have also been produced, the first, Spirou, was released in 1995 by Infogrames, and the second, Spirou: The Robot Invasion, was released in 2000 by Ubisoft. In Sierra's Playtoons series, Spirou and Fantasio appeared in the stories "The Case of the Counterfeit Collaborator" and "The Mandarin Prince".

=== Live-Action films ===
A live-action movie adaptation directed by Alexandre Coffre was released in 2018, starring Thomas Solivérès as Spirou, Alex Lutz as Fantasio, Christian Clavier as Count of Champignac, Géraldine Nakache as Seccotine and Ramzy Bédia as Zorglub.

== In popular culture ==
=== Stamps ===
On October 3, 1988, the Belgian Post issued a stamp featuring Spirou, drawn by Tome and Janry, in the series of comic stamps for youth philately. This was the fourth Belgian stamp showing a comic hero.

On February 26, 2006, the French Post issued a set of three Spirou et Fantasio stamps, featuring art by José-Luis Munuera. To commemorate the occasion, the Musée de la Poste de Paris (Paris Mail Museum) organized an exposition from February 27 to October 7, 2006, with two halls, one showing original plates and the other more recreational, with television, games, etc.

=== Statues ===
In 1991 a statue of Spirou and Spip posing for a photograph by Fantasio was erected in the Avenue du Général Michel in Charleroi. Another statue of Spirou and Spip, designed by Monique Mol in 2003, can be seen in the Prosper Pouletstraat at the Zeedijk in Middelkerke. On 1–2 September 2016, Manneken Pis was dressed in Spirou's uniform.

=== Murals ===
Spirou, Fantasio and Spip are portrayed on a mural in the Rue Notre Dame des Grâces/Onze-Lieve-Vrouw van Gratiestraat in Brussels as part of the Brussels' Comic Book Route. The mural was based on a design by Yoann and created in 2014 by graffiti artist Urbana (Nicolas Morreel). A second mural was created in the Elsenesteenweg 227A in Elsene, based on a drawing by Schwartz and Yann from the Spirou story Spirou and the leopard woman.

In September 2016 a mural was made in Middelkerke, based on a design by Hanco Kolk and created by Art Mural vzw.

=== Scientific instrument ===
SPIRou (SpectroPolarimètre Infra-Rouge) is a near-infrared spectropolarimeter and high-precision velocimeter designed and constructed by an international consortium for observing exoplanets and the forming of Sun-like stars and their planets. Silhouettes of Spirou and Spip are featured in its logo.

== Sources ==
- Spirou et Fantasio publications in Le journal de Spirou BDoubliées (in French)
