= Soda (comics) =

Belgian comic series

- Main character Soda with the series logo
- Author: Tome
- Illustrator(s): Bruno Gazzotti, Luc Warnant, Olivier Labalue, Dan Verlinden
- Current status/schedule: Running
- Launch date: 1986
- Publisher: Dupuis
- Genre(s): Adventure, Humor comics

Soda is a Franco-Belgian comics series by Tome (writing) and Bruno Gazzotti (art). The first two albums and the first eleven pages of the third were drawn by Luc Warnant, and the last (thirteenth) album by Dan (Dan Verlinden). It first appeared in the Franco-Belgian comics magazine Spirou on 29 April 1986.

Soda is the nickname of the main character of the series, NYPD Lieutenant David Elliot Hanneth Solomon, who masquerades as a priest for the benefit of his mother's health. In the Finnish version his real name was changed to Patrick Timothy O'Ralley. Soda only has three fingers on his left hand.

== Synopsis ==
Soda in action by Bruno Gazzotti

The son of the sheriff of the town of Providence, Arizona, David Solomon moved to New York City. Unable to find work he reluctantly joined the police force, but in his letters home he led his parents to believe that he had become a parish priest. This was in order to keep their minds at ease, since they did not want him to get into such a dangerous profession like his father. When his widowed mother Mary moved into his New York flat, David was forced to maintain the deception in fear that the truth would cause her a heart attack.

Thus, when he leaves for work, "Father David Solomon" is dressed as a priest on his way to his chapel, but in the elevator he switches to casual clothes which he wears as Lieutenant David Solomon aka "Soda" of the NYPD. He switches back to his priest's uniform when returning to the flat.

This can cause more than a few problems, and there are many times when David resolves to tell his mother the truth. However a timely reminder of her health by a third party means that he has to drop this resolution.

More often than not there is no time to switch clothing, so Soda is forced to go into action with a revolver in his priest clothes. He pays little heed to the Ten Commandments, let alone the "Thou shalt not kill" rule!

Mary herself fears New York City so much that she sticks to staying in the flat, rarely daring to go outside. As far as she is concerned, her beloved son's only vice is his smoking, which she keeps trying to discourage.

This premise helps to juxtapose the quiet and comfort of home life against the brutality and action of a policeman constantly chasing the dangerous elements of New York society. Sometimes the thugs that he deals with in his work find out where Soda lives, and he needs to work twice as hard to keep the criminals away from his mother and to keep her blissfully unaware of the dangers that encroach upon her (and him).

Soda's left hand has two fingers missing and is permanently gloved. So far it has never been explained how he lost these fingers.

== Secondary characters ==
Soda's colleagues include:

Police Captain Pronzini who often takes his pets to the office only for them to fall prey to his officers' humour, which can sometime be fatal (and not for the officers).

Sergeant Babs, whose constant eating means that he is most often deskbound, but his computer skills can be very useful in obtaining information. Babs is married to Martha, a rather ferocious housewife and mother-of-five, and to whom Babs is often unfaithful.

Officer Linda Tchaikowsky is Soda's partner in the fight against crime. Every morning she picks him up from his flat in the patrol car and drops him off in the evening — provided the case they have been handling does not result in her ending up in hospital. A divorcee, she is a tough African-American woman with rather expedient methods of getting the job done.

These characters help Soda maintain the pretense. If they have to call him and the phone is answered by Mary, they claim to be from the Salvation Army or a local convent.

== Stories ==
Soda's adventures have not been published in English, and only the first adventure was ever released in Finnish as part of Kirjakerho's Parhaat Sarjat series (issue #30, 1989). Below is a list of the French titles, their year of publication, an English translation of the titles and a brief description.

Title	Date of publication	English Translation	Writer	Artist
"Un ange trépasse"	1986	[An Angel Trespasses]	Tome	Luc Warnant
A young nurse held on drugs charges dramatically escapes while being transferred. Soda dismisses her claims of innocence but soon finds that he has to take them seriously if only for the sake of his mother.
"Lettres à Satan"	1987	[Letters to Satan]	Tome	Luc Warnant
Suffering from recurring nightmares, Soda opens up to a colleague and explains the circumstances that led him to become a cop and masquerade as a priest.
"Tu ne buteras point"	1990	[Thou Shalt Not Rub-out]	Tome	Luc Warnant / Bruno Gazzotti
Soda's life is thrown into further turmoil when his uncle comes for an unexpected visit. The problem is Fortescue McIntire is a genuine priest and is keen to see his nephew's chapel. Things are made even more complicated when the congregation is made up of convicts who escape, taking Father McIntire hostage.
"Dieu est mort ce soir"	1992	[God Has Died Tonight]	Tome	Bruno Gazzotti
A routine check on a drug deal ends fatally for a young police officer since the purchaser happens to feed his addiction by being a hitman. The killer is quickly identified but finding him proves tricky for Soda and the owners of Harley-Davidson motorbikes. And why all the interest in a common hundred dollar bill which quickly passes through from the lowest to the highest members of New York society?
"Fureur chez les saints"	1993	[Fury Amongst the Saints]	Tome	Bruno Gazzotti
The baby daughter of a mob accountant is kidnapped in order to prevent her father from testifying against his former bosses. Soda has little time to find her. A lead takes him to a monastery where he will have to play out the role of priest and cop at their fullest.
"Confession express"	1994	[Express Confession]	Tome	Bruno Gazzotti
Mary is to undergo tests to see if her heart condition has improved. If she is given the all-clear Soda intends to admit that he is not a priest but a cop. But the sudden "confession" by the victim of a "hit-and-run" leads to a double race against time: keeping Mary's heart and mind at ease and preventing a major terrorist attack.
"Lève-toi et meurs"	1995	[Stand Up and Die]	Tome	Bruno Gazzotti
Officer Danny Clearwater is young, good-looking and popular. Yet he refers to himself as "garbage", and for good reason: he won't hesitate to sacrifice a colleague's life in order to team up with Lieutenant Soda. His ultimate motives appear to be good ones, or are they?
"Tuez en paix"	1996	[Kill in Peace]	Tome	Bruno Gazzotti
A crime lord seeks revenge on Soda by putting a contract out on Mary, and this at a time when she finally agrees to leave the flat more often. Protecting her without her knowing it and maintaining the deception proves quite a chore for Soda and Sergeant Babs. (The title is a pun – as written, it means Kill in Peace, but sounds like "Tu es en paix" You are in/[at] peace.)
"Et délivre-nous du mal"	1997	[And Deliver Us from Evil]	Tome	Bruno Gazzotti
Soda and Mary return to their native town in order to show their respects to his late father. However, some of the locals prove far from happy by this visit and an incident on the inter-state coach simply adds fuel to their anxieties. Desperate measures are called for by both sides.
"Dieu seul le sait"	1999	[God Alone Knows]	Tome	Bruno Gazzotti
Soda suffers an accident (not uncommon in his job) but this time he also undergoes a mild form of amnesia and comes to believe that he really is a priest, complete with chapel. Officer Linda Tchaikowsky faces a very trying time in getting him back to normal. Could an escaped convict and some opera-loving gangsters be of any use? (This story is filled with references to the popular comic series XIII.)
"Prières et balistique"	2001	[Prayers and Ballistics]	Tome	Bruno Gazzotti
A convict's confession leads Soda and Tchaikowsky on to a case concerning the smuggling of nuclear material. Soda for his part finds the $10 million involved rather tempting. In the meantime, Mary gets involved with a man with whom she should not, and we find an unexpected twist to Soda and Tchaikowsky's apparently formal relationship. (This story raises the issue of the availability of nuclear material on the black market.)
"Code Apocalypse"	2005	[Code Apocalypse]	Tome	Bruno Gazzotti
Soda shoots a young man only to learn that he was a government assassin. He then learns that he is expected to carry out the assignment himself.
"Résurrection"	2015	[Resurrection]	Tome	Dan
14 years after 9/11, Soda deals with a different NYC and follows a lead of a new terrorist attack.
"Le Pasteur Sanglant"	2023	[The Blood-Stained Pastor]	Tome	Bruno Gazzotti
Soda investigates an attempted murder in which the victim identifies Soda himself as the assailant

== See also ==
- Belgian comics
- Franco-Belgian comics

== Sources ==
- Soda publications in Spirou BDoubliées (in French)
- Soda albums Bedetheque (in French)
- Kirjakerho Parhaat Sarjat listing (in Finnish)
