= Spirou et Fantasio (TV series) =

- Written by: Cyrille Vayssette
- Directed by: Daniel Duda
- Starring: Laurent Vernin; Sylvian Goldberg
- Composer: Fabrice Aboulker
- Countries of origin: France; Belgium
- Original language: French
- No. of seasons: 2
- No. of episodes: 39

Production
- Executive producer: Olivier Nomen
- Running time: 22 minutes

Original release
- Network: M6
- Release: September 3, 2006 – January 2009

Spirou et Fantasio, or, Les nouvelles aventures de Spirou et Fantasio, is an animated comedy-adventure television series based on the Franco-Belgian comics series Spirou et Fantasio. It premiered in France in September 2006. The show's English-language title is "Spirou & Fantasio (Two of a Kind)", or "Two of a Kind: Spirou & Fantasio". The English-dubbed version was made available on Netflix in the United States from January 8, 2013, till April 18, 2014.

== List of episodes ==
1. "L'Île de Zorglub 1" ("Zorglub's Island, Part 1")
2. "L'Île de Zorglub 2" ("Zorglub's Island, Part 2")
3. "Légende glacée" ("The Ice Legend")
4. "L'Arche de Zorglub" ("Zorglub's Ark")
5. "Vengeance des samouraï" ("The Samurai's Revenge")
6. "Robert le robot" ("Robert the Robot")
7. "Le troisième composant" ("The third component")
8. "Formez le cercle" ("Round and Round")
9. "Spip ne répond plus" ("Spip Disappears")
10. "Enfer vert" ("The Greening Effect")
11. "Hibernator" ("Love at First Fright")
12. "Un monstre de toute beauté" ("A Beautiful Monster")
13. "La Revanche de Zorglub" ("Zorglub's Revenge")
14. "Le ciel est tombé sur nos têtes" ("Everything's Rosy")
15. "L'École des petits génies" ("Child's Play")
16. "Fantasio fait des étincelles" ("Sparkling Fantasio")
17. "La taille fait la différence" ("It's All in the Size")
18. "Cure de jouvence" ("A Toast to Youth")
19. "La Clé d'Uhr" ("The Key to Uhr")
20. "La lumière de Shamash" ("Shamash")
21. "Trou bleu" ("True Blue")
22. "Super paparazzi" ("The Mysterious Paparazzi")
23. "Le maître des ombres" ("Light and Shadow")
24. "Zaoki décroche la Lune" ("Moonstruck Zaoki")
25. "In vivo" ("In Vivo")
26. "Zorglub ne tourne pas rond" ("Zorglub Stops the World")
27. "Eclipse Total" ("Total Eclipse")
28. "Seuls contre moi" ("Who's Who?")
29. "Poulpe fiction" ("Sea Fever")
30. "Fan de Zorglub" ("Zorglub's Fan Club")
31. "Bug" ("Game Plan")
32. "Numéro 1" ("Number One")
33. "Z-H2-O" ("Z-H2O")
34. "Coup de foudre" ("Stormy Weather")
35. "Spirou et Fantasia" ("Back to School")
36. "Le grand ménage" ("Heavy Housekeeping")
37. "Paradis perdu" ("Paradise Lost")
38. "Série B" ("Serie B")
39. "La femme invisible" ("The Invisible Woman")
