= Tronchet =

Tronchet is a surname. Notable people with the surname include:

- François Denis Tronchet (1726–1806), French politician
- Guillaume Tronchet (1867–1959), French architect
- Lucien Tronchet (1902–1982), Swiss baker, mason, and anarcho-syndicalist activist

== See also ==
- Le Tronchet (disambiguation)
