= Le Petit Spirou =

Belgian comic book series

The Spirou et Fantasio album La jeunesse de Spirou from 1987 became the launching pad for the spin-off series Le Petit Spirou.

Le Petit Spirou (Dutch: De Kleine Robbe; "Young Spirou") is a popular Belgian comic series created by Tome and Janry in 1987. The series developed from La jeunesse de Spirou (1987), a Spirou & Fantasio album in which Tome and Janry (at the time the authors of the series) set to imagine Spirou's youth. It was developed into a spin-off series shortly afterwards and the authors have focused on it ever since the controversy created after their final Spirou et Fantasio album, Machine qui rêve (1998). New albums are among the bestselling French-language comics, with 330,000 copies for the latest one.

In addition to continuing to develop the character in the spirit of previous Spirou et Fantasio author Franquin, in this series Tome and Janry paid homage to Franquin's manner of animating the gag's signature.

== Plot ==
This series details the antics of the character as an elementary schoolboy. A lot of the gags center around the character's interest in the opposite sex, most notably he and his pals coming up with ways of spying on the girls' showers and dressing rooms. Other topics concern religion and the contradictions and absurdities of the adult world. It is generally acknowledged that, psychologically speaking, the character in Le Petit Spirou has little in common with the clean-cut adult he will become.

== Characters ==
In La Jeunesse de Spirou, regular characters such as Fantasio, Spip the squirrel and their enemy Zantafio also featured as children. However, when the actual P'tit Spirou series came about it was decided to leave them out and to create new characters, given that, in the original series (started in the 1930s), Spirou had not met them until adulthood.

=== The children ===
- Spirou - The main character, already wearing his trademark red bellhop outfit.
- Antoine Vertignasse "Vert" - Spirou's best friend and companion in his adventures.
- Suzanne Berlingot "Suzette" - Spirou's girlfriend. (sometimes called "Susan" in English translations)
- Nicolas Ponchelot - Spirou's second best friend, with a good appetite and a few extra pounds.
- Cyprien Futu "Cassius" - Another friend of Spirou, of African origins. The son of the school's cook. His nickname is a reference to Cassius Clay as he is very good at boxing.
- Jean-Henri Masseur - Another friend, big and not very intelligent. In French "Masseur" sounds like "ma soeur", "My sister". This allows Suzette to trade photos of the naked Masseur for treats, as people understand "Je te donnerai une photo de Masseur nue" ("I'll give you a nude photo of Masseur") as "Je te donnerai une photo de ma sœur nue" "I'll give you a nude photo of my sister".
- André-Baptiste Depérinconu - The secret son of the abbot? In any case, he copies him in everything. Word play on French "de père inconnu", "of unknown father".
- Marine (who prefers to be called Mandarine) from "My Treasure Island"

=== The adults ===
- Mr. Mégot - The gym teacher, always trying to organize original sporting events that always end in disaster. Drinks and smokes a lot. "Mégot" is French for a cigarette butt.
- Abbot Langelusse - He always has ideas to pray God's glory and save the souls of his flock, which usually also end in disaster. A word play on angelus.
- Miss Claudia Chiffre - The math teacher. "Chiffre" is French for digit and an obvious play on the name Claudia Schiffer.
- Melchior Dugenou - A timid teacher with big glasses and the boyfriend of Miss Chiffre, which nobody understands why. He is a good head shorter than his girlfriend, Miss Chiffre.
- Pépé Spirou - Spirou's grandfather and his favourite adult. At his age, he is not much wiser than his grandson. He also wears the family's trademark red outfit.
- Mrs. Gourmandine - Pépé's girlfriend.
- Mrs. Spirou - Spirou's mother, dressed in a female version of her son's red outfit.
- Mr. Spirou - Spirou's father, dressed in the standard bellboy outfit. He appears seldom in the series and his face is never seen. Tome claims that this was because he would have looked too much like the adult Spirou. Tome also claims that he did not know his own father well and that he lacked "emotional documentation on the subject".

== Albums ==
Like the main series, these albums are published by Dupuis.

1. Dis bonjour à la dame (Say hello to the lady, 1990)
2. Tu veux mon doigt? (Do you want my finger?, 1991)
3. Mais qu'est-ce que tu fabriques? (What are you doing?, 1992)
4. C'est pour ton bien (It's for your own good, 1994)
5. "Merci" qui? ("Thanks" to whom?, 1994)
6. N'oublie pas ta capuche! (Don't forget your hood!, 1996)
7. Demande à ton père! (Ask your father!) (1997)
8. T'as qu'à t'retenir! (Just hold it [pee] in) (1999)
9. C'est pas de ton âge! (That's not something for your age!, 2000)
10. Tu comprendras quand tu s'ras grand! (You'll understand when you'll grow up, 2001)
11. Tu ne s'ras jamais grand! (You'll never grow up!, 2003)
12. C'est du joli! (Nice work!, 2005)
13. Fais de beaux rêves (Sweet dreams, 2007)
14. Bien fait pour toi ! (Serves you right!, 2008)
15. Tiens-Toi Droit! (Stand straight!, 2010)
16. T'Es Gonfle! (You're swelling!, 2012)
17. Tout le monde te regarde! (Everyone's looking at you!, 2015)
18. La Vérité sur tout! (The truth about everything!, 2019)

== Translations ==
Le Petit Spirou has been translated to several languages, including Dutch (De Kleine Robbe, distributed by Dupuis), Croatian (Mali Spirou, distributed by Strip-Agent), Spanish (El Pequeño Spirou, edited by Ediciones Kraken) and Danish, Swedish, Norwegian, Finnish and Polish (Den lille Splint, Den unge Spirou, Lille Sprint, Pikku Piko and Mały Sprytek, published by Egmont), Indonesian (little spirou, distributed by BIP), and Slovenian (Mali Spirou, distributed by Graffit).

== Media adaptations ==
The comic was adapted into an animated TV series in 2012. live-action movie adaptation was released in the fall of 2017. It is directed by Nicolas Bary and stars Pierre Richard, François Damiens and Natacha Régnier.
