= Robert Velter =

French cartoonist

Rob-Vel
- Born: Robert Velter; 9 February 1909 Paris, France
- Died: 27 April 1991 (aged 82) Saint-Malo, France
- Pseudonyms: Robvel, Bozz
- Notable works: Spirou, Spip

François Robert Velter (French: [vɛltɛʁ]; 9 February 1909 – 27 April 1991), known by his pen-name Rob-Vel ([ʁɔbvɛl]), was a French cartoonist. He is best known for creating the character Spirou in 1938.

== Biography ==
Spirou by Rob-Vel

Like Spirou, Velter began his career as a lift attendant at age 16, in the London Ritz Charlton. He later learned the trade as an assistant to American cartoonist Martin Branner on the Winnie Winkle strip from 1934 to 1936.

In 1938, Velter created the title character for the launch of a new magazine by Belgian publisher Éditions Dupuis, Le Journal de Spirou. Signed with the pen-name Rob-Vel, the story was titled Groom au Moustic–hôtel (Bellboy at the Hotel Mosquito, named after another of Dupuis magazines). Later the same year, he created Spirou's inseparable companion, the squirrel Spip, for the story L’héritage.

When Velter was drafted and wounded in 1940, his wife Davine (Blanche Dumoulin) took over the strip for a while.

After the war, Velter published a number of strips, including Le Père Pictou, Les Tribulations du Chien Petto, Bibor et Tribar and the newspaper comic M. Subito, but he was never able to reach the broad popularity of Spirou again.
