= Philippe Vandevelde =

Belgian comics writer (1957–2019)

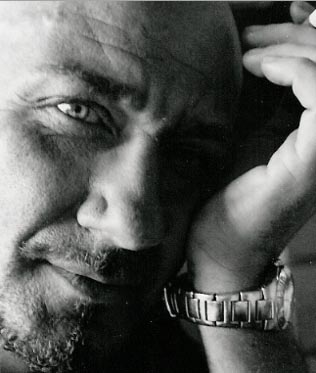
- Born: 24 February 1957 Brussels, Belgium
- Died: 5 October 2019 (aged 62)
- Area: writer
- Pseudonym: Tome
- Notable works: Soda; Spirou et Fantasio; Le Petit Spirou
- Awards: full list

Philippe Vandevelde, working under the pseudonym Tome (24 February 1957 – 5 October 2019), was a Belgian comics writer. He was known for collaborations with Janry on Spirou et Fantasio and Le Petit Spirou, and with Luc Warnant and later Bruno Gazzotti on Soda. He also collaborated with Ralph Meyer on Berceuse assassine, and with Marc Hardy on Feux. Earlier in his career he was an assistant-artist for Dupa.

== Biography ==
Vandevelde was born in Brussels. An operation left him blind for a short while at the age of eight. His first experiences of comics were the Adventures of Tintin story King Ottokar's Sceptre and Corentin read aloud to him. Under the pseudonyms "Phil" and "Tom", he published his first illustrations and comics for the school magazine Buck (made by Thierry Groensteen) from 1972 to 1974. His first comic was a medieval parody Estrel, le troubadour.

Tome began his professional comics career in the studio of Dupa, the author of Cubitus, where he met Janry who would become a long-time collaborator. After assisting Turk and De Groot on series such as Léonard and Clifton, they began working at the Franco-Belgian comics magazine Spirou in 1979, their first assignment being the games page Jeureka.

In 1980 they began work on their first Spirou et Fantasio adventure, the iconic forty-year-old series of Spirou. Previously created by a succession of authors including the famous André Franquin, Tome and Janry were given the task in alternation with another creative team of Nic and Cauvin. Eventually assuming sole responsibility of the series, Tome and Janry continued creating stories until 1998, completing 14 albums, in addition to creating Le Petit Spirou, a series about Spirou's youth, for which they made 14 albums since 1990.

== Awards ==
- 1992: Humour Award and Youth Award (9–12 years) at the Angoulême International Comics Festival, France
- 2000: nominated for Best German-language Comic for Children and Young People at the Max & Moritz Prizes, Germany

- nominated for the Best Scenario Award and the Youth Award (9–12 years) at the Angoulême International Comics Festival

- 2002: nominated for Best International Writer at the Max & Moritz Prizes

== Bibliography ==
- Spirou et Fantasio
- Le Petit Spirou
- Soda
- "Feux"
- "Sur la Route de Selma"
- "Berceuse Assassine"
- "Les Minoukini"
- "Le Gang Mazda"

== Sources ==
- Tome publications in Spirou BDoubliées (in French)
- Tome albums Bedetheque (in French)
