= Spirou (comics) =

- Spirou as drawn by Robert Velter in the late 1930s

Publication information
- Publisher: Dupuis (Belgium)
- First appearance: Spirou #1 (April 24th, 1938)
- Created by: Robert Velter

In-story information
- Alter ego: Le Petit Spirou
- Team affiliations: Staff of Journal de Spirou, Fantasio, Spip, Marsupilami, Gaston Lagaffe

Spirou (Walloon pronunciation: [spiˈʀu], Walloon pronunciation: [spiˈʀøː]; French: [spiʁu]; Walloon for "squirrel", "mischievous"; Dutch: Robbedoes) is a Belgian comic strip character and protagonist in the comic strip series Spirou & Fantasio and Le Petit Spirou, and the eponymous character of the Belgian comic strip magazine Spirou.

== History ==
The character was originally created by Robert Velter (Rob-Vel) for the launch of Le journal de Spirou (Spirou magazine) in 1938. Spirou was originally an elevator operator and bell-boy at the fictional Moustique Hotel. At some point he became a reporter for the eponymous magazine, though he remained dressed in his trademark red uniform.

Spirou's design was changed through the years by the various writers and artists who created his adventures but he has kept his spiky red-hair and clothes of the same colour even after ditching his hotel uniform.

== Character ==
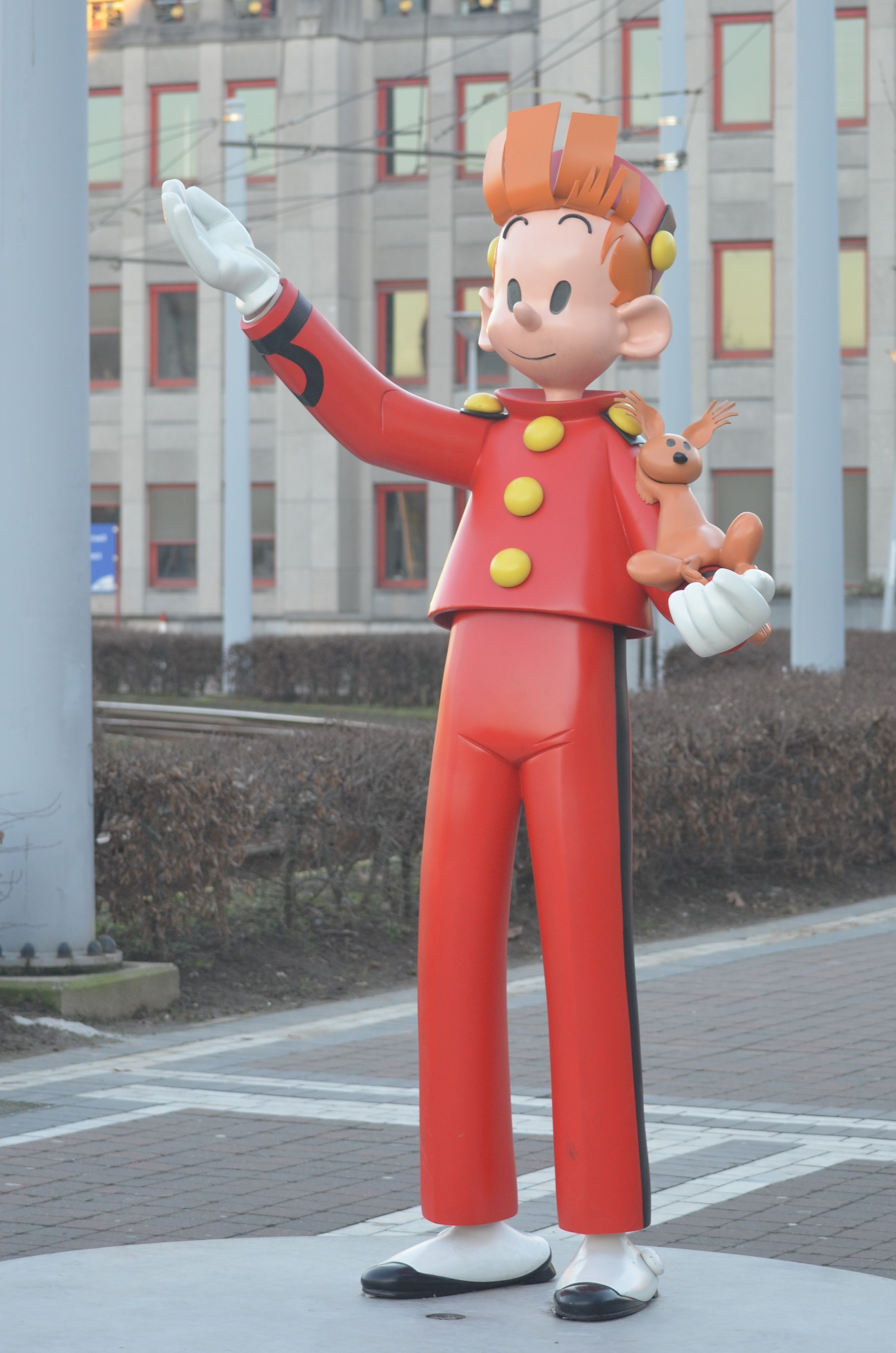
Spirou and Spip greet travelers on the esplanade of Charleroi-South railway station.

In contrast to Tintin, Spirou is more frequently shown doing some reporting in several of his adventures. While he and reporter colleague Fantasio occasionally pursue stories, in most cases they simply find themselves in the centre of adventures. An honest and brave young man of indeterminate age, he tries to fight injustice around him and help people. He is usually more level-headed than Fantasio, who always accompanies him, along with the pet squirrel Spip, and during the period of Franquin authorship, the Marsupilami.

== Spin-off ==
A six-year-old version of Spirou is the star of the spin-off series Le Petit Spirou, which is concerned with his tribulations at school and the anatomy of girls. This later series and its star are generally acknowledged to have little in common with the old one.

In 2018 a theme park in Monteux, Parc Spirou, inspired by this character, was opened.

== In popular culture ==
Spirou is part of the Comic Book Route and can be found at Place Sainctelette in Brussels.
