= Jean-Richard Geurts =

Belgian comics artist

Janry
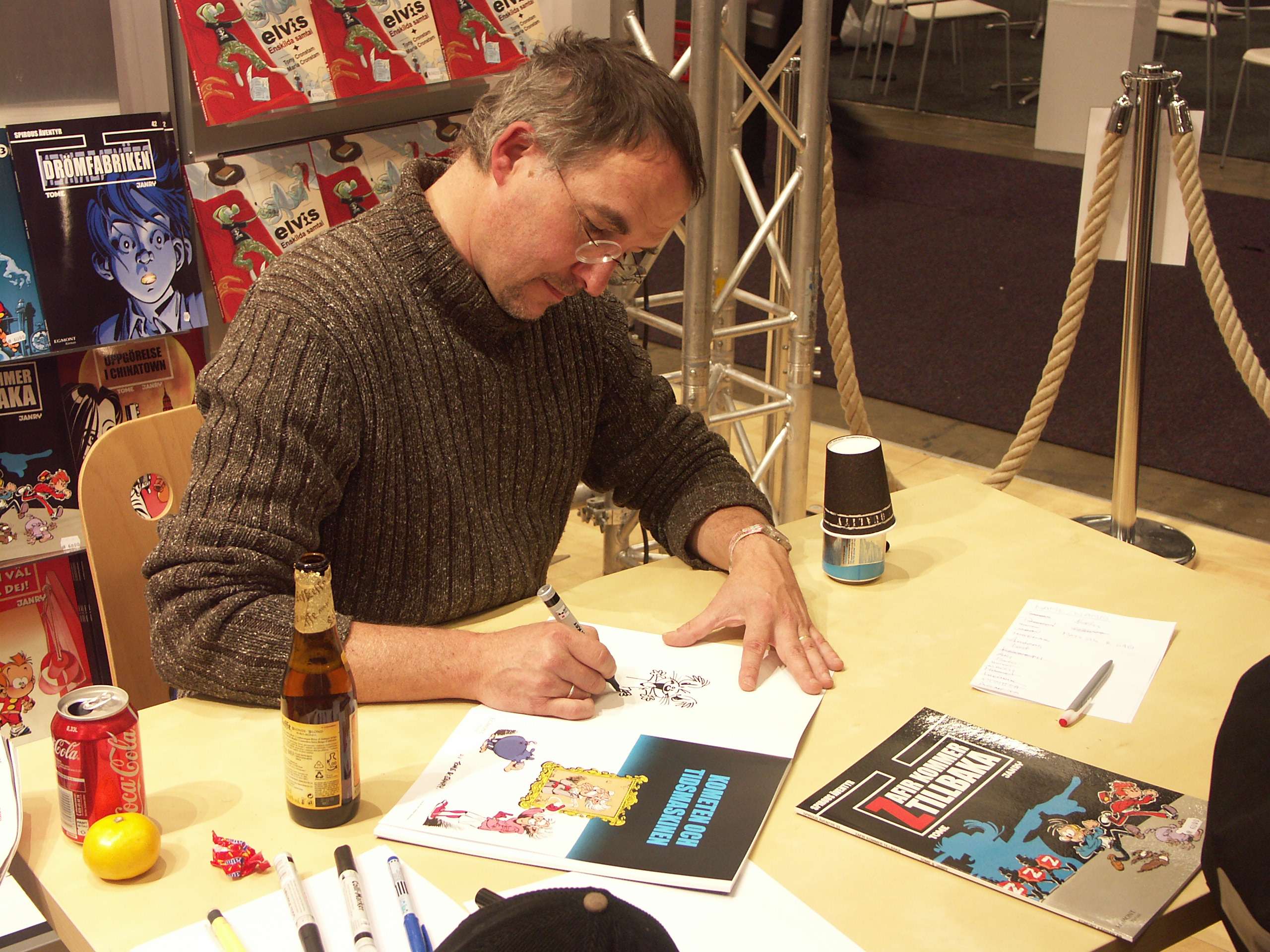
- Born: Jean-Richard Geurts; 2 October 1957 (age 69) Jadotville, Belgian Congo
- Area: artist
- Notable works: Le Petit Spirou; Spirou et Fantasio
- Awards: full list

Jean-Richard Geurts, better known under his pseudonym Janry (born 2 October 1957), is a Belgian comics artist. With Tome he created Le Petit Spirou and made several Spirou et Fantasio albums.

== Early life ==
Born in Jadotville (now Likasi) in the Belgian Congo (now Democratic Republic of the Congo), he moved to Brussels, Belgium with his parents when he was ten years old, and went to school in Jodoigne. His main hobby at the time was drawing, especially planes and other technological items.

== Career ==
In 1974, he took a comics course where he learned to draw figures, and where he met Vandevelde, of the same age and also studying in Jodoigne, although at a different college. They became friends, and attended the same Art Academy in Woluwe-Saint-Lambert studying the making of comics. There they met Stéphane De Becker, and the three together made comics, sharing the roles of author, artists, and colourist, but later they all would more or less specialize, with Janry mainly functioning as the artist.

After his studies, Janry began a professional career by becoming the assistant of Francis for the series Ford T, and later assisted Dupa for Cubitus. During this period, he also collaborated with Greg and with Turk and Bob de Groot.

Together with Tome, he started working for Spirou magazine, where they created the games page Eureka!, signing as J.R. and PH. They later changed their pseudonyms to Tome (for Philippe Vandevelde, who used Tom from a very early age) and Janry (from Jean-Richard). This was intended as a pun on Tom and Jerry.

In 1981, they started working with the adventures of Spirou et Fantasio. This is the title series of Spirou magazine, in continuous production since 1938 by a succession of authors, most famously André Franquin. The last of those, Jean-Claude Fournier, had left the series at the end of the 1970s, and the magazine was looking for a solution to get the series back in production. Three teams started making stories, but after a few years only Tome and Janry remained. For them, it was a childhood dream, and they showed their first two pilot pages to Franquin to get some advice. They continued making stories until 1998, when after 14 albums they ended their run.

However, in 1988, they began the project Le Petit Spirou, a spin-off telling stories from Spirou's youth, predominantly in the 1 page format. Since then, they have published 12 albums of this series. After a few years, the series reached a circulation of 500,000 copies for each new album, thus becoming more successful than the original series.

Janry now functions as artist, and Tome as author of the stories, with Stéphane De Becker as colourist.

== Bibliography ==
- Spirou et Fantasio, 1984–1998, 14 albums, with Tome
- Le Petit Spirou, 1990-..., 19 albums, with Tome
- Passe moi l'Ciel, 1999-..., 5 albums, with Stuf (Stéphane de Becker) as artist

== Awards ==
- 1992: Youth Prize (9-12 years) and Humour Award at the Angoulême International Comics Festival, France, both for Le Petit Spirou
