= Dupuis =

Belgian publisher of comic albums and magazines

- Parent company: Média-Participations (2004–present)
- Founded: 1922; 104 years ago
- Founder: Jean Dupuis
- Country of origin: Belgium
- Headquarters location: Marcinelle, Hainaut, Belgium
- Distribution: France, Switzerland, Belgium, Netherlands, Canada
- Key people: Claude de Saint Vincent
- Fiction genres: Comic albums and magazines
- Official website: www.dupuis.com

Éditions Dupuis S.A. (French: [dypɥi]) is a Belgian publisher of comic albums and magazines, founded in 1922 and currently owned by French/Belgian media conglomerate Média-Participations. It is the publisher of comics such as Spirou et Fantasio, Gaston, and The Smurfs. Based in Marcinelle near Charleroi, Dupuis is most widely known for its comic albums and magazines. Initially a French language publisher, it now publishes in both French and Dutch.

== History ==
=== Early years ===
Dupuis was founded in 1922 by Jean Dupuis (1875–1952). In 1938, Dupuis began publishing the men's magazine Le moustique (The Mosquito in French, Humoradio in Dutch), the women's magazine Bonnes Soirées (Good Evenings in French, De Haardvriend (The Hearth's Friend) in Dutch) and the children's comics magazine Spirou. The latter was originally only published in French, and contained a mixture of American comics (e.g. Superman, Brick Bradford, and Red Ryder) and new creations (Spirou et Fantasio and Tif et Tondu). A few months later, a Dutch edition called Robbedoes followed.

=== Growth after WWII ===
After the end of the paper shortages and American comic bans that came as a result of World War Two, Dupuis began expanding. Le moustique was becoming more popular, and Spirou grew to be one of the two leading Franco-Belgian comics magazines (together with Tintin magazine). Dupuis started publishing books, and found success republishing serial comics as albums. Dupuis acquired many popular European comics, including Lucky Luke, The Smurfs, Gaston Lagaffe and Largo Winch.

=== Stabilization and diversification ===
In the early sixties, Dupuis began selling merchandise and producing animated movies featuring characters from their comics. Towards the end of the 1960s, Dupuis began to decrease in popularity. Some magazines were struggling, the merchandising was vastly reduced, and the movie studio did not produce any successful movies. The core business' comics and main magazines, however, continued to be hugely successful, with a comics catalogue of more than 2000 titles available in French. Many of the series were turned into animated movies in the 1990s, including Papyrus and Spirou et Fantasio, at which point they also began producing computer games.

In June 2004, Dupuis was bought by Média-Participations, a media conglomerate that now owns many European comic book publishers, including Dargaud and Le Lombard,

In August 2007, Dupuis increased its animation production activities when they partnered with Belgian broadcasting network RTBF to form an in-house Belgian graphic & animation production studio called DreamWall, with Dupuis holding a 51% stake and RTBF holding a 49% stake in the new studio while Thibault Baras became DreamWall's managing director.. The animation studio is located at Marcinelle in Charleroi and would handle all animation services for all of the animated television series produced by Dupuis' production subsidiary Dupuis Audiovisuel, and its fellow animation studios Dargaud Media and Ellipsanime Productions, among others. When DreamWall was established it was originally temporary located at RTBF's headquarters at Reyers Tower in Schaerbeek, Brussels before it moved to its current headquarters right next to Dupuis' main in-house publishing headquarters in June 2008 and was remained there since. Before DreamWall was formed, Thibault Baras had established and developed Belgium's first virtual reality production set for weather graphics & virtual production assets for news broadcasts, magazine programming & sports/live events for the broadcaster RTBF in 2005.

On August 20, 2008, Dupuis rebranded its logo, replacing its former speech bubble logo. The new logo was in a purple sans-serif font, with the hat of the comic book character Spirou.

At the start of April 2010, DreamWall had partnered with Dame Blanche, Victor Studio, FDP Production, and Virtualis to establish a new investment fund and tax shelter framework entitled Go West Invest.

In December 2010 following the launch of DreamWall three years ago in 2007 by Dupuis and RTBF, Dupuis and RTBF had collaborated with TéléSambre, and RTC Liège to jointly establish a new creative virtual production studio based in Dupuis & DreamWall's headquarters in Marcinelle entitled KeyWall, that would serve as a subsidiary of DreamWall. However 10 years later, DreamWall had acquired KeyWall and had it merged into the main animation production parent DreamWall under one single unit with DreamWall assuming KeyWall's virtual production assets and had it split into two departments which are DreamWall Media Solutions, the unit would handle set design, augmented reality and virtual studio production, video mapping, and the production of weather and traffic reports, and DreamWall Animation, that would handle all of animation production services for Ellipse Animation's programming like The Smurfs

In March 2013, Dupuis announced that they're buying out and taking full control of the publisher Marsu Productions along with their catalogue. More recently, in 2015, Dupuis joined with twelve other European comics publishing actors to create Europe Comics, a digital initiative co-funded by the European Commission's Creative Europe program.

In January 2019, Dupuis announced that they've launched their first European webtoon production subsidiary and platform dedicated to European and African authors named Webtoon Factory.

In January 2024, Dupuis announced that their manga publishing imprint Vega Dupuis had joined forces with Japanese manga publishing company Kadokawa to launch a joint venture business named Vega SAS to publish Japanese and Korean comics for the French language markets alongside Kadokawa's own titles which will be their focus with Kadokawa acquiring a 51% stake in Dupuis's imprint Vega Dupuis whilst Dupuis retaining the 49% stake in the imprint.

In June 2022, during the Annecy International Animation Film Festival, Dupuis Edition & Audiovisuel alongside their parent company Dupuis and its owner Media Participations brought all of their French animation production labels (which were Dupuis Edition & Audiovisuel, Dargaud Media and Ellipsanime Productions alongside their in-house Paris & Angoulême-based animation production studio division Ellipse Studio) under one umbrella group named Ellipse Animation as Dupuis had transitioned its film & television production division Dupuis Edition & Audiovisuel to the new production group as a label.

== Main publications ==
This is a selection of magazines and comics series originally or mainly published by Dupuis. Some titles later changed to a different publisher.

=== Magazines ===
- Moustique (created as "Moustique" in 1924, named "Télémoustique" between the 1960s and 2011) and its Flemish counterpart HUMO (since 1936, originally called "Humoradio"). Both versions have been sold to other publishers.
- Spirou, since 1938: between 1938 and 2005 also a Flemish version, "Robbedoes".

=== Comics series ===
This is a selected list of comics series, ordered by year of first publication by Dupuis, with main authors given. Many series were also continued or temporarily taken over by other artists and writers. Some of the series have been taken over by other publishers.

- 1938: Spirou & Fantasio by Robert Velter, Jijé, André Franquin, ...
- 1938: Tif et Tondu by Fernand Dineur, Will, ...
- 1941: Jean Valhardi by Jijé
- 1946: Lucky Luke by Morris and René Goscinny
- 1947: Blondin et Cirage by Jijé
- 1947: Buck Danny by Victor Hubinon and Jean-Michel Charlier
- 1952: Johan and Peewit by Peyo
- 1954: Jerry Spring by Jijé
- 1954: La Patrouille des Castors by Mitacq and Charlier
- 1956: Gil Jourdan by Maurice Tillieux
- 1957: Gaston by André Franquin and Yvan Delporte
- 1958: The Smurfs by Peyo
- 1958: Le Vieux Nick et Barbe-Noire by Marcel Remacle
- 1959: Boule et Bill by Jean Roba
- 1960: Benoît Brisefer by Peyo
- 1961: Bobo by Paul Deliège and Maurice Rosy
- 1963: Génial Olivier by Jacques Devos
- 1965: Sibylline by Raymond Macherot
- 1965: Sophie by Jidéhem
- 1967: Les Petits Hommes by Pierre Seron
- 1968: Les Tuniques Bleues by Louis Salvérius, Lambil, and Raoul Cauvin
- 1969: Isabelle by Will, Franquin, Delporte and Macherot
- 1970: Natacha by François Walthéry and Gos
- 1970: Sammy by Berck and Cauvin
- 1970: Yoko Tsuno by Roger Leloup
- 1972: Scrameustache by Gos
- 1974: Papyrus by Lucien De Gieter
- 1975: Agent 212 by Daniel Kox and Cauvin
- 1981: Billy the Cat by Stéphane Colman and Stephen Desberg
- 1981: Les Femmes en Blanc by Philippe Bercovici and Cauvin
- 1982: Jeannette Pointu by Marc Wasterlain
- 1982: Kogaratsu by Michetz and Bosse
- 1982: Jérôme K. Jérôme Bloche by Alain Dodier
- 1986: Aria by Michel Weyland
- 1983: Pierre Tombal by Marc Hardy and Cauvin
- 1983: Jojo by André Geerts
- 1986: Soda by Bruno Gazzotti and Tome
- 1986: Cédric by Laudec and Cauvin
- 1987: Le Petit Spirou by Tome and Janry
- 1987: Jessica Blandy by Renaud Dufaux and Jean Dufaux
- 1987: Théodore Poussin by Frank Le Gall
- 1988: Cupidon by Malik and Cauvin
- 1988: Jeremiah (comics) by Hermann Huppen
- 1990: Largo Winch by Philippe Francq and Jean Van Hamme
- 1992: Mélusine by Clarke and François Gilson
- 1993: Kid Paddle by Midam
- 1996: Dallas Barr by Marvano
- 2001: Violine by Didier Vasseur and artist Fabrice Tarrin
- 2003: Parker and Badger by Marc Cuadrado
- 2004; Lady S by Philippe Aymond and Van Hamme
- 2005: The Bellybuttons by Maryse Dubuc and Delaf
- 2005: Orbital by Sylvain Runberg and Serge Pellé
- 2006: Seuls by Fabien Vehlmann and Bruno Gazzotti
- 2010: Michel Vaillant by Jean Graton
