= Catalan Communications =

American publisher

- Founded: April 1983; 42 years ago
- Founders: Bernd Metz, Herb Spiers, and Josep Toutain
- Defunct: 1991; 34 years ago
- Country of origin: U.S.
- Headquarters location: 43 East 19th Street; New York City
- Key people: Bernd Metz; Tom Leighton; Elizabeth Bell
- Publication types: Comics, trade paperbacks
- Imprints: ComCat

Catalan Communications was a New York City publishing company that existed from 1983 to 1991. Operated by Bernd Metz, Catalan Communications mainly focused on English-language translations of European graphic novels. These were presented as high-quality trade paperbacks, or comic albums — a European book format that American comic book readers were not yet accustomed to. Both the physical dimensions and the mature content were unfamiliar to U.S. audiences, who often referred to the format dismissively as "Euro-comics."

Metz became one of the first American publishers to introduce U.S. readership to European-style comics on a larger scale than the niche-market efforts undertaken by HM Communications (Note: Metz was not the only American publisher who tried to introduce the European graphic novel to his countrymen; NBM Publishing too, tried their hand at translated European graphic novels in the same time span Catalan was active, and there was some overlap in authors who were published in English by both, most notably Milo Manara. But unlike for Catalan, the English-language publication of European productions has never been a core business for NBM, but rather executed on a more haphazardly experimental scale, and NBM therefore persevered longer than Catalan in their efforts. However, and like Catalan, NBM found out for themselves that American readership did not take to European comics at all – save for a small "intellectual" niche market, making their translation endeavors not commercially worthwhile – and threw in the towel in the early 2000s themselves when they too ceased all their "Euro-comics" translation efforts.) – publisher of the groundbreaking Heavy Metal magazine – in the preceding decade.

== History ==
Page five from New York/Miami (Catalan, 1990) by Loustal and Philippe Paringaux, translated by Elizabeth Bell

The company was founded in April 1983 as a collaboration between Bernd Metz (1944–2012), Herb Spiers, and Josep Toutain (1930–1997) of the Spanish art agency Selecciones Ilustradas. It published from 1984 until 1992, operating out of a large loft located at 43 East 19th Street. Metz was the editor-in-chief, and the novelist Tom Leighton and later Elizabeth Bell provided English translations for the French and French-edition titles, including Max Cabanes' Colin-Maillard (Heartthrobs). Despite initial struggles, the company was able to quickly establish financial stability, in large part due to their printing being done in Europe, where it was more economical to produce small press runs.

On August 1, 1985, United States Customs Service officials seized copies of Massimo Mattioli's Squeak the Mouse on the grounds that the book was obscene. Since all of Catalan's publications were adult-only material, and at least as susceptible to seizure as Squeak the Mouse, Metz chose to fight the obscenity charge in court. Metz won the case, and distributors actually increased their orders for Squeak the Mouse following the seizure, despite a coinciding price increase on the book. After that, Catalan started an all-ages imprint and adopted rating systems for their various publications.

In 1990, Cabanes' Colin-Maillard graphic novel was the winner of the Grand Prix at France's Angoulême International Comics Festival. One of Bell's translated books for Catalan revealed errors in an earlier Heavy Metal translation of the same story. James Keller, the Germanic studies scholar, translated the German edition of Sacher-Masoch's Venus in Furs (Guido Crepax) in 1991, the year the company released its last titles. Tom Leighton was the IT arm of the firm, as well as the translator from French until 1989. Jeff Lisle translated from Italian and Spanish.

Other books published by Catalan included Jacques Loustal's Love Shots, Lorenzo Mattotti's Fires, and Barcelona artist Marti Riera's The Cabbie, with an introduction by Art Spiegelman. Published in five languages, Trip to Tulum by Federico Fellini and Milo Manara, with essays translated by Elizabeth Bell, was selected by Publishers Weekly as one of the best trade paperbacks of 1990.

In 1989–90, Catalan expanded its line with the "ComCat" line of comic albums aimed at an all-age readership, such as Blake and Mortimer, The Adventures of Yoko, Vic and Paul, Code XIII and Young Blueberry, the type of European comics traditionally referred to by its French-derived "bande dessinées" qualifier.

In 1991, attempting to stay afloat, the company offered returns on their books, but they closed down that same year.

== Publications ==
=== Catalan titles ===
Title	Art	Script	Year	ISBN
Abominations	Hermann		1990	ISBN 0-87416-080-4
Anarcoma	Nazario		1984	ISBN 0-87416-000-6
The Ape	Milo Manara	Silverio Pisu	1986	ISBN 0-87416-019-7
Bell's Theorem #1: Bell's Theorem	Matthias Schultheiss		1987	ISBN 0-87416-037-5
Bell's Theorem #2: The Connections	Matthias Schultheiss		1988	ISBN 0-87416-062-6
Bell's Theorem #3: Contact	Matthias Schultheiss		1989	ISBN 0-87416-074-X
Billy Budd, KGB	François Boucq	Jérôme Charyn	1991	ISBN 0-87416-111-8
Bodyssey	Richard Corben	Simon Revelstroke	1986	ISBN 0-87416-032-4
Breakthrough	Various		1990	ISBN 0-87416-097-9
Burton & Cyb: 1	José Ortiz	Antonio Segura	1990	ISBN 0-87416-101-0
The Cabbie	Marti Riera		1987	ISBN 0-87416-042-1
Cases from the Files of Sam Pezzo P.I.: 1	Vittorio Giardino		1988	ISBN 0-87416-057-X
Click! #1: A Woman Under the Influence	Milo Manara		1985 (January and May printings with different ISBNs)	ISBN 0-8741-6009-X; ISBN 0-87416-055-3
Companions at Dusk #1: The Spell of the Misty Forest	François Bourgeon		1991	ISBN 0-87416-126-6
Corben Collected Works #1: Underground 1	Richard Corben		1985	ISBN 0-87416-018-9
Corben Collected Works #2: Underground 2	Richard Corben		1986	ISBN 0-87416-026-X
Corben Collected Works #3: Rowlf – Underground 3	Richard Corben		1987	ISBN 0-87416-031-6
Dark Tales	Jordi Bernet	Enrique Sánchez Abulí	1990	ISBN 0-87416-082-0
Den: Neverwhere	Richard Corben		1984	ISBN 0-87416-003-0
Dorm Girls	José Luis Galiano	Marta Guerrero; Alfredo Pons	1991	ISBN 0-87416-100-2
Dr. Jekyll & Mr. Hyde	Guido Crepax		1990	ISBN 0-87416-079-0
Dulled Feelings	Igort		1990	ISBN 0-87416-090-1
Edgar Allan Poe. The Fall of the House of Usher and Other Tales of Horror.	Richard Corben		1985	ISBN 0-87416-013-8
Erma Jaguar #1: Erma Jaguar: 1	Alex Varenne		1990	ISBN 0-87416-099-5
Erma Jaguar #2: Erma Jaguar: 2	Alex Varenne		1991	ISBN 0-87416-117-7
Evaristo: Deep City	Francisco Solano López	Carlos Sampayo	1987	ISBN 0-87416-034-0
Exterminator 17	Enki Bilal	Jean-Pierre Dionnet	1986	ISBN 0-87416-024-3
Fires	Lorenzo Mattotti		1987	ISBN 0-87416-048-0
Ghita of Alizarr #1: Ghita of Alizarr 1	Frank Thorne		1991	ISBN 0-87416-095-2
Ghita of Alizarr #2: Ghita of Alizarr 2	Frank Thorne		1985	ISBN 0-87416-010-3
Good-Bye and Other Stories	Yoshihiro Tatsumi		1988	ISBN 0-87416-056-1
Giuseppe Bergman #1: The Great Adventure	Milo Manara		1988	ISBN 0-87416-063-4
Giuseppe Bergman #2: An Author in Search of Six Characters	Milo Manara		1989	ISBN 0-87416-071-5
Giuseppe Bergman #3: Dies Irae	Milo Manara		1990	ISBN 0-87416-077-4
Giuseppe Bergman #4: Perchance to dream	Milo Manara		1990	ISBN 0-87416-086-3
H.R. Gigers Necronomicon 2	H.R. Giger		1986	ISBN 0-87416-029-4
Hearts of Sand	Loustal	Philippe Paringaux	1991	ISBN 0-87416-134-7
Heartthrobs	Max Cabanes		1991	ISBN 0-87416-128-2
Hidden Camera	Milo Manara		1990	ISBN 0-87416-098-7
The Hunting Party	Enki Bilal	Pierre Christin	1990	ISBN 0-87416-053-7
Ice Age #1: Blind Mists	Christian Gine	Didier Convard	1990	ISBN 0-87416-107-X
Ice Age #2: Death Bird	Christian Gine	Didier Convard	1991	ISBN 0-87416-132-0
Indian Summer	Milo Manara	Hugo Pratt	1989	ISBN 0-87416-030-8
Jeremiah #13: Strike	Hermann		1990	ISBN 0-87416-106-1
Joe's Bar	José Muñoz	Carlos Sampayo	1987	ISBN 0-87416-046-4
Justine	Guido Crepax		1991	ISBN 0-87416-136-3
Killer Condom	Ralf König		1991	ISBN 0-87416-146-0
Kogaratsu #1: The Bloody Lotus	Marc Michetz	Bosse	1990	ISBN 0-87416-103-7
Kogaratsu #2: Treasure of Eta (Note: Announced (on back covers of released preceding series volumes), but cancelled due to Catalan's mid-1991 bankruptcy.)	Marc Michetz	Bosse	1991	ISBN 0-87416-131-2
Kogaratsu #3: Spring of Betrayals	Marc Michetz	Bosse	1991	ISBN 0-87416-133-9
Light and Bold	Jordi Bernet		1990	ISBN 0-87416-122-3
Little Ego	Vittorio Giardino		1989	ISBN 0-87416-069-3
Love Machine	Horacio Altuna		1991	ISBN 0-87416-120-7
Love Shots	Loustal	Philippe Paringaux	1988	ISBN 0-87416-059-6
Mark of the Dog	Silvio Cadelo		1991	ISBN 0-87416-113-4
A Matter of Time	Juan Gimenez		1985	ISBN 0-87416-012-X
Max Friedman #1: Hungarian Rhapsody	Vittorio Giardino		1987	ISBN 0-87416-033-2
Max Friedman #2: Orient Gateway	Vittorio Giardino		1987	ISBN 0-87416-041-3
Morbus Gravis	Paolo Eleuteri Serpieri		1990	ISBN 0-87416-115-0
Necron #1	Magnus		1989	ISBN 0-87416-072-3
Necron #2	Magnus		1990	ISBN 0-87416-118-5
Necron #3	Magnus		1991	ISBN 0-87416-107-X
New York/Miami	Loustal	Philippe Paringaux	1990	ISBN 0-87416-073-1
Nikopol #1: Gods in Chaos	Enki Bilal		1988	ISBN 0-87416-049-9
Nikopol #2: Woman Trap	Enki Bilal		1988	ISBN 0-87416-050-2
Outer States	Enki Bilal		1990	ISBN 0-87416-085-5
Paper Man	Milo Manara		1986	ISBN 0-87416-022-7
Peter Pank	Max		1991	ISBN 0-87416-119-3
Pioneers of the Human Adventure	François Boucq		1989	ISBN 0-87416-075-8
The Ranks of the Black Order	Enki Bilal	Pierre Christin	1989	ISBN 0-87416-052-9
RanXerox #1: RanXerox in New York	Tanino Liberatore	Stefano Tamburini	1984	ISBN 0-87416-027-8
RanXerox #2: Happy Birthday Lubna	Tanino Liberatore	Stefano Tamburini	1985	ISBN 0-87416-008-1
Realms	Paul Kirchner		1987	ISBN 0-87416-043-X
Rebel	Pepe Moreno		1986	ISBN 0-87416-020-0
Remember Jonathan	Cosey		1990	ISBN 0-87416-104-5
Rocco Vargas, The Astral Adventures of #1: Triton	Daniel Torres		1986	ISBN 0-87416-025-1
Rocco Vargas, The Astral Adventures of #2: The Whisperer Mystery	Daniel Torres		1990	ISBN 0-87416-096-0
Rocco Vargas, The Astral Adventures of #3: Saxon	Daniel Torres		1990	ISBN 0-87416-114-2
Romantic Flower	Silvio Cadelo		1990	ISBN 0-87416-088-X
Shooting Stars	Rod Kierkegaard Jr.		1987	ISBN 0-87416-028-6
Shorts	Milo Manara		1989	ISBN 0-87416-060-X
Snowman	Milo Manara	Alfredo Castelli	1990	ISBN 0-87416-124-X
Squeak the Mouse	Massimo Mattioli		1989	ISBN 0-87416-070-7
Stella Norris #1: Hurricane	Roberto Baldazzini	Lorena Canossa	1991	ISBN 0-87416-112-6
Superwest Comics	Massimo Mattioli		1987	ISBN 0-87416-035-9
Tex Arcana #1: Tex Arcana	John Findley		1987	ISBN 0-87416-036-7
Tex Arcana #2: Tex Arcana Meets the Toast of Europe/Part 1	John Findley		1991	ISBN 0-87416-129-0
The Last Voyage of Sindbad	Richard Corben		1988	ISBN 0-87416-054-5
The Magician's Wife	François Boucq	Jérôme Charyn	1987	ISBN 0-87416-045-6
The Man from Harlem	Guido Crepax		1987	ISBN 0-87416-040-5
The Specialist: Full Moon in Dendera	Magnus		1987	ISBN 0-87416-044-8
The Survivor #1: The Survivor	Paul Gillon		1990	ISBN 0-87416-116-9
The Survivor #2: The Heir	Paul Gillon		1991	ISBN 0-87416-083-9
The Talking Head	Paolo Baciliero		1990	ISBN 0-87416-105-3
Torpedo 1936 #1	Alex Toth, Jordi Bernet	Enrique Sánchez Abulí	1984	ISBN 0-87416-125-8
Torpedo 1936 #2	Jordi Bernet	Enrique Sánchez Abulí	1985	ISBN 0-87416-014-6
Torpedo 1936 #3	Jordi Bernet	Enrique Sánchez Abulí	1986	ISBN 0-87416-023-5
Torpedo 1936 #4	Jordi Bernet	Enrique Sánchez Abulí	1987	ISBN 0-87416-039-1
Torpedo 1936 #5	Jordi Bernet	Enrique Sánchez Abulí	1988	ISBN 0-87416-058-8
Torpedo 1936 #6	Jordi Bernet	Enrique Sánchez Abulí	1991	ISBN 0-87416-078-2
Torpedo 1936 #7	Jordi Bernet	Enrique Sánchez Abulí	1991	ISBN 0-87416-125-8
The Towers of Bois-Maury # 3 Germain (Note: Almost certainly never released as its ISBN was reassigned to the "Dorm Girls" title which did see a Grand Comics Database confirmed publication a year later, contrary to the "Germain" title.)	Hermann		1990	ISBN 0-87416-100-2
The Town That Didn't Exist	Enki Bilal	Pierre Christin	1989	ISBN 0-87416-051-0
Trip to Tulum	Milo Manara	Federico Fellini	1990	ISBN 0-87416-123-1
Venus in Furs	Guido Crepax		1991	ISBN 0-87416-091-X
Video Clips	Tanino Liberatore	Stefano Tamburini	1985	ISBN 0-87416-015-4
Werewolf	Richard Corben		1986	ISBN 0-87416-007-3
Zeppelin	Pepe Moreno		1986	ISBN 0-87416-021-9
Zora and the Hibernauts	Fernando Fernandez		1984	ISBN 0-87416-001-4

=== ComCat titles ===
Title	Art	Script	Year	ISBN
Blake and Mortimer #1: The Time Trap	Edgar P. Jacobs	Edgar P. Jacobs	1989	ISBN 0-87416-066-9
Blake and Mortimer #2: Atlantis Mystery	Edgar P. Jacobs	Edgar P. Jacobs	1990	ISBN 0-87416-094-4
Yoko Vic and Paul #1: Vulcans Forge	Roger Leloup	Roger Leloup	1989	ISBN 0-87416-065-0
Yoko Vic and Paul #2: The Three Suns of Vina	Roger Leloup	Roger Leloup	1989	ISBN 0-87416-076-6
Code XIII #1: Day of the Black Sun	William Vance	Jean van Hamme	1989	ISBN 0-87416-061-8
Code XIII #2: Where the Indian Walks	William Vance	Jean van Hamme	1989	ISBN 0-87416-081-2
Code XIII #3: All the Tears of Hell	William Vance	Jean van Hamme	1990	ISBN 0-87416-092-8
Magic Crystal #1: Magic Crystal	Marc Bati	Moebius	1989	ISBN 0-87416-067-7
Magic Crystal #2: Island of the Unicorn	Marc Bati	Moebius	1990	ISBN 0-87416-084-7
Magic Crystal #3: Aurelys's Secret	Marc Bati	Moebius	1990	ISBN 0-87416-102-9
Young Blueberry #1: Blueberry's Secret	Moebius	Jean-Michel Charlier	1989	ISBN 0-87416-068-5
YoungBlueberry #2: A Yankee named Blueberry	Moebius	Jean-Michel Charlier	1990	ISBN 0-87416-087-1
Young Blueberry #3: The Bluecoats	Moebius	Jean-Michel Charlier	1990	ISBN 0-87416-093-6
Young Blueberry #4: Missouri Demons	Colin Wilson	Jean-Michel Charlier	1991	ISBN 0-8741-6109-6
Young Blueberry #5: Terror over Kansas	Colin Wilson	Jean-Michel Charlier	1991	n/a

== Sources ==
- Decker, Dwight R.; Jordan, Gil; Thompson, Kim (March 1989). "'Another World of Comics & From Europe with Love: An Interview with Catalan's Outspoken Bernd Metz' and 'Approaching Euro-Comics: A Comprehensive Guide to the Brave New World of European Graphic Albums'". Amazing Heroes. No. 160. Westlake Village, California: Fantagraphics Books. pp. 18–52.
- Smith, Kenneth (May 1992). "Homage to Catalan: Burton & Cyb, Companions of the Dusk, Mark-of-the-Dog, Dark Tales, Heartthrobs, and Billy Budd KGB". Comics Library. The Comics Journal. No. 150. pp. 52–53.
- Catalan Communications at the Grand Comics Database
