= Paul Ulrich Villard =

French chemist and physicist (1860–1934)

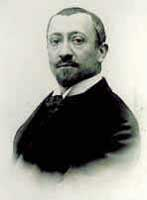
- Villard, c. 1908
- Born: 28 September 1860; Saint-Germain-au-Mont-d'Or, France
- Died: 13 January 1934 (aged 73); Bayonne, France
- Education: École normale supérieure
- Known for: Discovery of gamma rays Villard circuit
- Scientific career
- Fields: Physics
- Workplaces: École normale supérieure

Paul Ulrich Villard (28 September 1860 – 13 January 1934) was a French chemist and physicist. He discovered gamma rays in 1900 while studying the radiation emanating from radium.

== Early research ==
Villard was born in Saint-Germain-au-Mont-d'Or, Rhône. He graduated from the École Normale Supérieure in 1881 and taught in several Lycées, ending with a Lycée in Montpellier. He would maintain a laboratory position at the Ecole Normale Supérieure until his retirement. At the time when he discovered what we now call gamma rays, Villard was working in the chemistry department of the École Normale Supérieure rue d'Ulm, Paris.

Villard is also credited with the discovery of argon hydrate. He spent the early part of his career (1888–1896) focusing on similar compounds at high pressure.

== Discovery of gamma rays ==
Villard investigated the radiation emitted by radium salts via a narrow aperture in a shielded container onto a photographic plate, through a thin layer of lead that was known to stop alpha rays. He was able to show that the remaining radiation consisted of a second and third type of rays. One of those was deflected by a magnetic field (as were the familiar "canal rays") and could be identified with Ernest Rutherford's beta rays. The last type was a very penetrating kind of radiation which had not been identified before.

Villard was a modest man and he did not suggest a specific name for the type of radiation he had discovered. In 1903, it was Rutherford who proposed to call Villard's rays gamma rays because they were far more penetrating than the alpha rays and beta rays which he himself had already differentiated and named (in 1899) on the basis of their respective penetrating powers. The name stuck.

== Later work ==
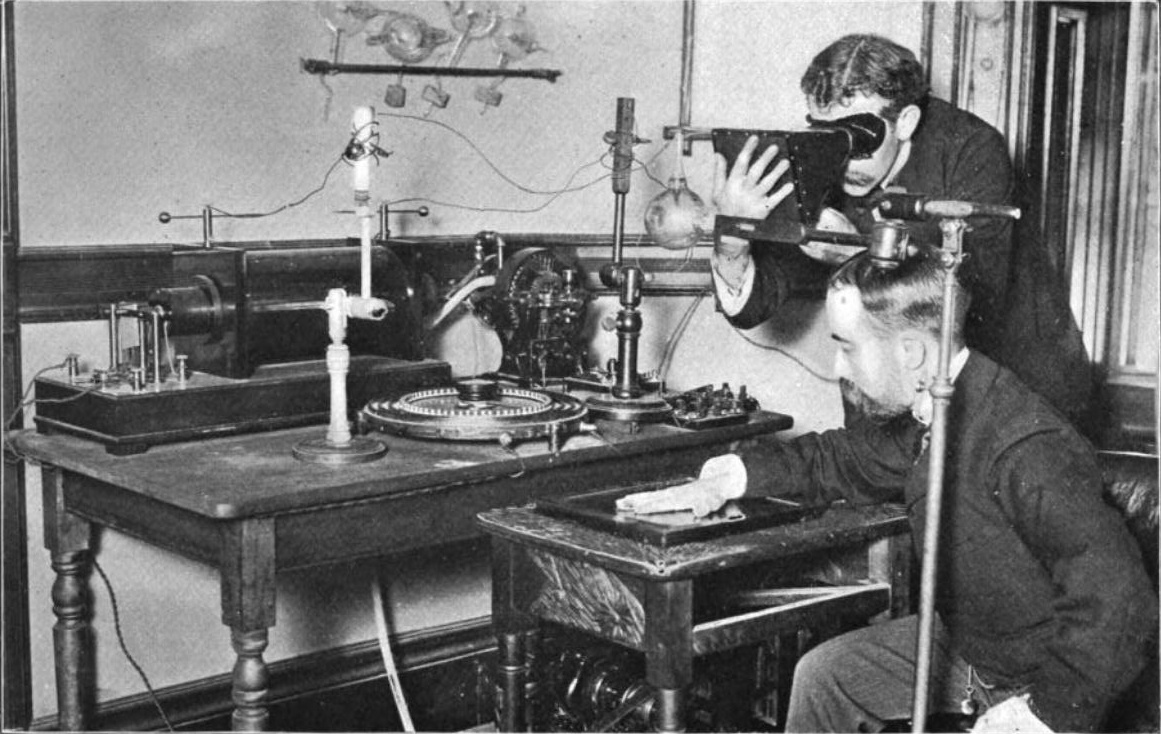
Taking an X-ray image with early Crookes tube apparatus in 1896. The Crookes tube is visible in the centre. The standing man is viewing his hand with a fluoroscope screen. This was a shortcut method for setting up the tube.No precautions against radiation exposure are being taken.

Villard spent much time perfecting safer and more accurate methods of radiation dosimetry, which had been done very crudely up until then (typically by evaluating the quality of the image of the experimenter's hand produced on a photographic plate). In 1908, Villard pioneered the use of an ionization chamber for the dosimetry of ionizing radiation. He defined a unit of kinetic energy released per unit mass which was later renamed the roentgen.

== Retirement and death ==
When Villard retired, he left Paris. He died in Bayonne, France, on January 13, 1934.
