= Alex Varenne =

French comics artist (1939–2020)

- Born: 29 August 1939 Saint-Germain-au-Mont-d'Or, France
- Died: 19 October 2020 (aged 81)
- Notable works: Ardeur, Erma Jaguar

Alex Varenne (29 August 1939 – 19 October 2020) was a French comic book artist and writer, known by his erotic works. He worked often in collaboration with his brother Daniel Varenne.

== Life and work ==
Varenne was born in Saint-Germain-au-Mont-d'Or, in 1939. After studying in Lyon, he became an art teacher.

In 1979 he created with his brother Daniel the dystopical sci-fi comic book series Ardeur, published at Charlie Mensuel. Six volumes of that series were published between 1980 and 1987. In 1985 he worked on L'Affaire Landscape, also written by Daniel.

While doing work for Charlie Mensuel, Varenne also drew erotic stories for L'Écho des savanes, such as Carré noir sur dames blanches (1984), Erma Jaguar, later published in three volumes (1988-1992), Corps à corps (1987), Les Larmes du sexe (1989), Amours fous (1991), and the portfolios Erotic Opera (1986), Fragments érotiques (1993), and Le Goût des femmes (2002). Most of them were published by Albin Michel in France; Erma Jaguar was published in English by Catalan Communications in the United States.

For Casterman, Varenne worked on the graphic novels Angoisse et Colère (1988, written by Daniel Varenne adapted from the novel Mars) and Gully Traver (1993).

In 2002, Varenne illustrated Brigitte Lahaie's Les 12 Signes de l'amour for éditions Geisha, where he also published Juliette et autres contes fripons in 1999 and Yumi in 2000.

== Awards ==
- 1984 : Prix Saint-Michel for best foreign artist for Ida Mauz (Ardeur, t. 5), with Daniel Varenne

== Bibliography ==
- Luc Duthil, Varenne. Itinéraire d'un libertin, PLG, 2007, ISBN 2-9522729-7-2.
