= Bell's Theorem (comics) =

Cover of English-language edition of Bell's Theorem #1: Lifer, originally published in 1987. Cover art by Matthias Schultheiss, copyright by Matthias Schultheiss and Catalan Communications

Bell's Theorem (original German title Die Wahrheit über Shelby, lit. "The Truth about Shelby") is a three-volume science-fiction horror graphic novel by German comic artist Matthias Schultheiss that originally published between 1985 and 1988. It was Schultheiss's breakthrough work as a graphic novel artist. The title references Bell's theorem from quantum mechanics.

It first appeared under the French title Le théorème de Bell in serialized form in the Franco-Belgian comics magazine L'Écho des savanes from 1985 onwards, before being published as three standalone volumes in Germany and France. It has been published in English (with a translation by Tom Leighton) as Bell's Theorem by Catalan Communications, with the English-language volumes titled Lifer, The Connection, and Contact, respectively.

== Plot ==
=== Lifer ===
In volume 1, Lifer, we're introduced to US American career criminal Shelby who has been sentenced to life imprisonment. The prison management makes him an offer to significantly reduce his sentence by volunteering for "mostly harmless" medical experimentation for a few years. Shelby agrees and is transported to the privately owned, high-security research facility, where it soon turns out that the experiments consist of new weaponry tested on criminals like him as targets, and he is informed that he can't withdraw his signature of consent retroactively. None of the criminals tested on so far is known to have survived long enough to be released.

While Shelby is recovering from his first experiment where he has been severely injured by a laser gun, he is one night secretly visited by Frank, one of the facility's inmates, who himself is already too damaged to flee by himself, as he is already half dead, half consisting of bionic implants the scientists only gave him so they could experiment on him longer. He gives Shelby civilian clothes and tells him how to escape from the facility.

Shelby flees into the desert and soon arrives at a highway where he can hitch-hike. But his wounds are starting to bleed again and he collapses near a rest stop, where he is found unconscious by a woman who takes him home and tends to his injuries. Once he has recovered from his wounds and the fever after a few weeks, he rapes the woman, steals her money and her car, and flees across the border, hiding in the wilderness near Canada's Arctic Circle for a few years until they won't be looking for him anymore.

During his lone wanderings in Labrador, Shelby one day comes upon a deserted cabin by the Atlantic Ocean where he finds a man's corpse in a large-hooded parka and sleeping bag. Searching the body, he finds the man's identity papers to find out that the dead looked his spitting image and that he was German scientist Amselstein, which explains a lot of mysterious apparitions in the cabin mostly made of wood, strings, wire, and cans. (A short preface text to the volume informed us briefly of Amselstein's research in quantum physics and the nature of reality, and of his mysterious disappearance.) Amselstein's body itself is still wearing a set of fake earphones made ouf the materials, and Shelby finds out that noises come from them whenever whales appear in the sea near the cabin.

Shelby decides to assume Amselstein's identity and go to Germany. With him, he takes Amselstein's notes and the mysterious set of earphones. He goes back to civilization, buys himself new clothes, and books a ticket for the flight, but as soon as he arrives at the airport, he is approached by two FBI agents who have identified him as a wanted criminal and tell him that they will send him back to the research facility. He kills them at the airport's men's room and boards his plane just in time, but as soon as he has a seat and the plane is going into lift-off, he has a frightening vision of Amselstein's rotting corpse in parka and sleeping bag sitting next to him. End of volume 1.

=== The Connection ===
Cover of English-language edition of Bell's Theorem #2: The Connection, originally published in 1988. Cover art by Matthias Schultheiss, copyright by Matthias Schultheiss and Catalan Communications

Arriving in Hamburg, Germany, Shelby locates Amselstein's apartment by looking into the phonebook, but all he finds is an empty flat without any furniture in it. Shelby finds a different address written in the dust on one of the windows and leaves. Shortly after he has left, the flat is searched by a group of government agents in search of Amselstein as they have been informed by somebody at the airport that he has returned. One of the agents comes upon the address scribbled on the window, but before he can read it out, mysterious flashes like from Shelby's vision of Amselstein appear, the window bursts, and the agent dies from wounds to his guts and throat within seconds before he can tell the others what the address was.

Shelby arrives at Amselstein's secret home, a house boat full of Amselstein's mysterious trademark contraptions, on the shore of the Elbe river, towered by Hamburg's darkly looming Köhlbrand Bridge. His tormenting nightmarish visions increase, as he further delves into Amselstein's mysterious notes on quantum mechanics, is being visited by Sarah, a prostitute who used to be Amselstein's girlfriend, and is on the run from government agents who wish to either ensure him resume his work for the US government, willing or otherwise, or make dead sure what they think is a brilliant scientist will not work for anybody else.

Following advice by a homeless bum who knew Amselstein, Shelby visits Paul, a former co-worker of Amselstein's who has since gone mad and is now in a lunatic asylum. Throughout volume 2, we have seen shots of Paul in the asylum, causing some of the events helping Shelby, apparently by some means of telekinesis. Paul is not surprised to see Shelby, explaining to the disbelieving Shelby that Shelby really is Amselstein (or a variant of him) and that it is all part of a quantum experiment, which is also why he can't remember being Amselstein. Paul's incoherent speech resembles elements from Amselstein's notes in their continued reference to quantum mechanics and Amselstein's suspicions of being connected to an alternate version of himself, none of which Shelby takes as references to himself or even takes seriously as the science talk is just beyond him.

Paul tells Shelby to later take a black tugboat that just now appears outside the room's window overlooking the Elbe river, and that Amselstein awaits Shelby "in the bowels of the earth", that is an old subterranean World War II bunker inaccessible for decades because of a broken lift as its only entry. End of volume 2, as Paul is maniacly attempting to convince Shelby that he is Amselstein and Shelby insisting that he is crazy.

=== Contact ===
Cover of English-language edition of Bell's Theorem #3: Contact, originally published in 1989. Cover art by Matthias Schultheiss, copyright by Matthias Schultheiss and Catalan Communications

Shelby leaves the asylum disgruntled, thinking it was a bad idea to even just go there and talk to what is an apparent madman. Upon his departure, Paul asks him to kill the asylum staff wardens that torment him and keep him from helping Shelby, but Shelby just brushes Paul's plea off, as he doesn't take him seriously.

As his visions further increase and with the government agents on his heels, he visits Sarah at her workplace at Herbertstraße and kills her pimp. The couple then flees from the police across St. Pauli Piers and, taking a motorboat, through the Port of Hamburg, followed by regular police and port authorities. Meanwhile, the hunt for Shelby turns into open warfare as the US government agents have determined that no money in the world can bribe the fake Amselstein and have snipers set up throughout the port to first kill all German security forces after him and intending to ultimately do the same with Shelby, and Paul from his asylum cell seemingly further influences the events by means of telekinesis.

Paul pilots the mysterious black tugboat to ram the port authority's ship and sink it, as the US agents shoot down the police helicopter overseeing the hunt for Shelby and Sarah, and the wreck crashes onto the tugboat that Shelby has entered by now, setting it on fire. The tugboat rams a bridge with the US agents on it and apparently kills them. Desperate to find out who is piloting the mysterious tugboat, Shelby further wrecks the pilot cabin with an axe. The only person he finds on the tugboat at last is Frank, the part-cyborg inmate from the medical research facility from volume 1, severely injured when the helicopter crashed on the boat. He gives Shelby a bag, telling him that he'll need what's inside, and bloodily kills himself by ripping off his prosthetic skull cap. Paul in the asylum meanwhile has died from an apparent heart attack due to exhaustion.

The tugboat brings Shelby to the old WWII bunker that Paul has told him about, with the broken lift entry now mysteriously working. Deep within "the bowels of the earth", Shelby finds a derelict hangar with a colossal WWII U-boat. Inside, he finds more of Amselstein's mysterious contraptions, and shouting angrily at Amselstein, asking where he is hiding, he breaks open a door, only to find the insides of Amselstein's cabin in Labrador. In shock and disbelief, Shelby steps through the door, whereupon the portal immediately closes behind him.

The spot where Amselstein's body lay is empty. Left with no food, no sufficient clothing for the cold of the Labrador wilderness, and a several-weeks hike to the next outpost of civilization, Shelby checks on the bag Frank has given him, only to find a certain large parka and a sleeping bag inside of it, both of which he knows all too well from his continuing visions of Amselstein's corpse. Reciting Amselstein's final note about life as but a dream, he dresses in them, puts on Amselstein's mysterious tincan headphones, and lies on the ground to die, ending up as the corpse of Amselstein for his younger self to soon find.

== English-language reviews ==
"Intense, complex, lyrical, contemplative yet still excessively violent and scarily sexually charged, this gripping, mind-bending fantasy keeps the tension honed from beginning to end while constantly pushing the conceptual envelope. It's also astonishingly lovely to look at and long overdue for reissue – preferably in one extra-long, adults-only single serving…"

— Win Wiacek, Bell's Theorem volumes 1-3, in "Comics Review (UK)"

"This is a weird work that moves slowly, despite the scenes of violent action. There is not much of a plot until Shalby gets to the beach, and the connections between events are difficult to follow. The watercolor art is cool and sparse and exceptionally effective in its portrayal of the bleak atmosphere."

— D. Aviva Rothschild, Review of volume 1, "Lifer", in "Graphic Novels: A Bibliographic Guide to Book-Length Comics", p. 158

== Editions ==
=== German ===
- Die Wahrheit über Shelby
  - Lebenslänglich, Carlsen 1986
  - Die Verbindung, Carlsen 1987
  - Der Kontakt, Carlsen 1988

=== French ===
- Le théorème de Bell
  - Le théorème de Bell, Albin Michel 1986
  - Le contact, Albin Michel 1988
  - La solution, Albin Michel 1990

=== English ===
- Bell's Theorem
  - Bell's Theorem #1: Lifer, Catalan Communications 1987 (ISBN 978-0874160376)
  - Bell's Theorem #2: The Connection, Catalan Communications 1988 (ISBN 978-0874160628)
  - Bell's Theorem #3: Contact, Catalan Communications 1989 (ISBN 0-87416-074-X)
