= Daniel Torres (cartoonist) =

Spanish comics artist

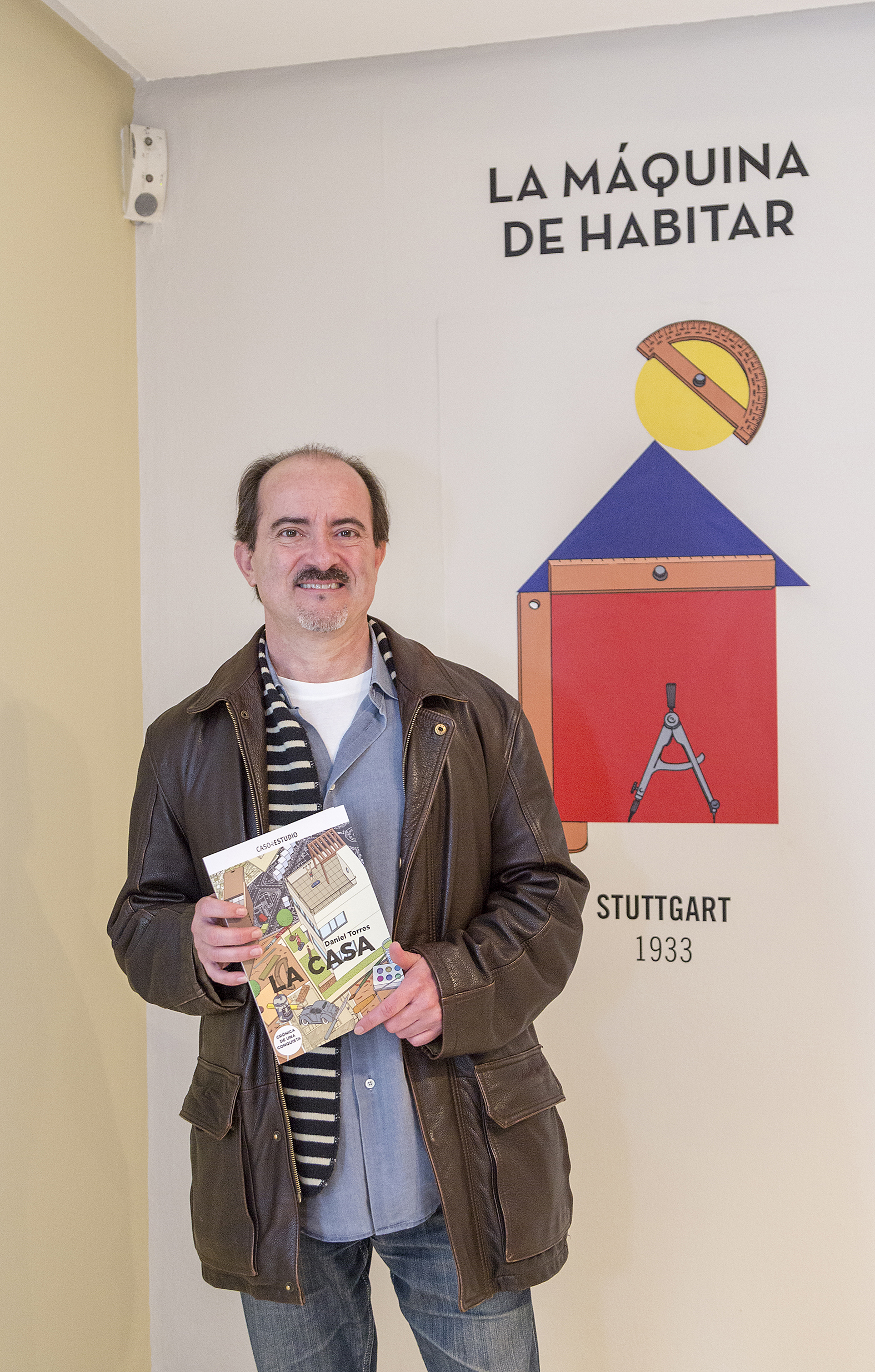
- Daniel Torres with the cathalogue of the exhibition of his works held at IVAM, 2017.
- Born: 20 August 1958 (age 68) Teresa de Cofrentes, Valencia, Spain
- Areas: artist, writer, colourist
- Notable works: Rocco Vargas; Tom; Opium
- Awards: Best Spanish Work, 1993 Salón Internacional del Cómic de Barcelona

Daniel Torres (born 20 August 1958) is a Spanish cartoonist, known for several series, including the science-fiction series Rocco Vargas, about a writer in a retrofuturistic world and Tom, a series for children about a friendly dinosaur.

== Biography ==
=== Childhood and youth ===
Son of a rural doctor, Daniel Torres frequently changed residence during his childhood. In 1975, he began architecture studies at the University of Valencia, although he would finally end up replacing them with those of Fine Arts. At the same time, he began collaborating with "The Gat Pelat" through Miguel Calatayud.

In 1980, already installed in Barcelona, he began his professional career in the magazine "El Víbora" with Murder at 64 Images Per Second, creating the character Claudio Cueco while still at university.

== Bibliography ==
- Opium (Partly published in English by Knockabout and Heavy Metal)
- Sabotage! (Published in English by Dark Horse Comics)
- Tom (1995–present)
- Burbujas (Norma 2009)
- La casa (Norma, 2015)

=== Rocco Vargas ===
- Rocco Vargas adventures in English include:
  - Triton (Catalan 1986)
  - The Whisperer Mystery (Catalan 1990)
  - Saxxon (Catalan 1991)
    - Rocco Vargas HC (Dark Horse 1998) Reprints three earlier stories and a new, Far Star.
  - Rocco Vargas: The Dark Forest (HC, Dark Horse 2001)
  - Rocco Vargas: A Game of Gods (HC, Dark Horse 2004)
  - Rocco Vargas: Walking with Monsters (HC, Dark Horse 2005)
