= Matthias Schultheiss =

German graphic novel artist

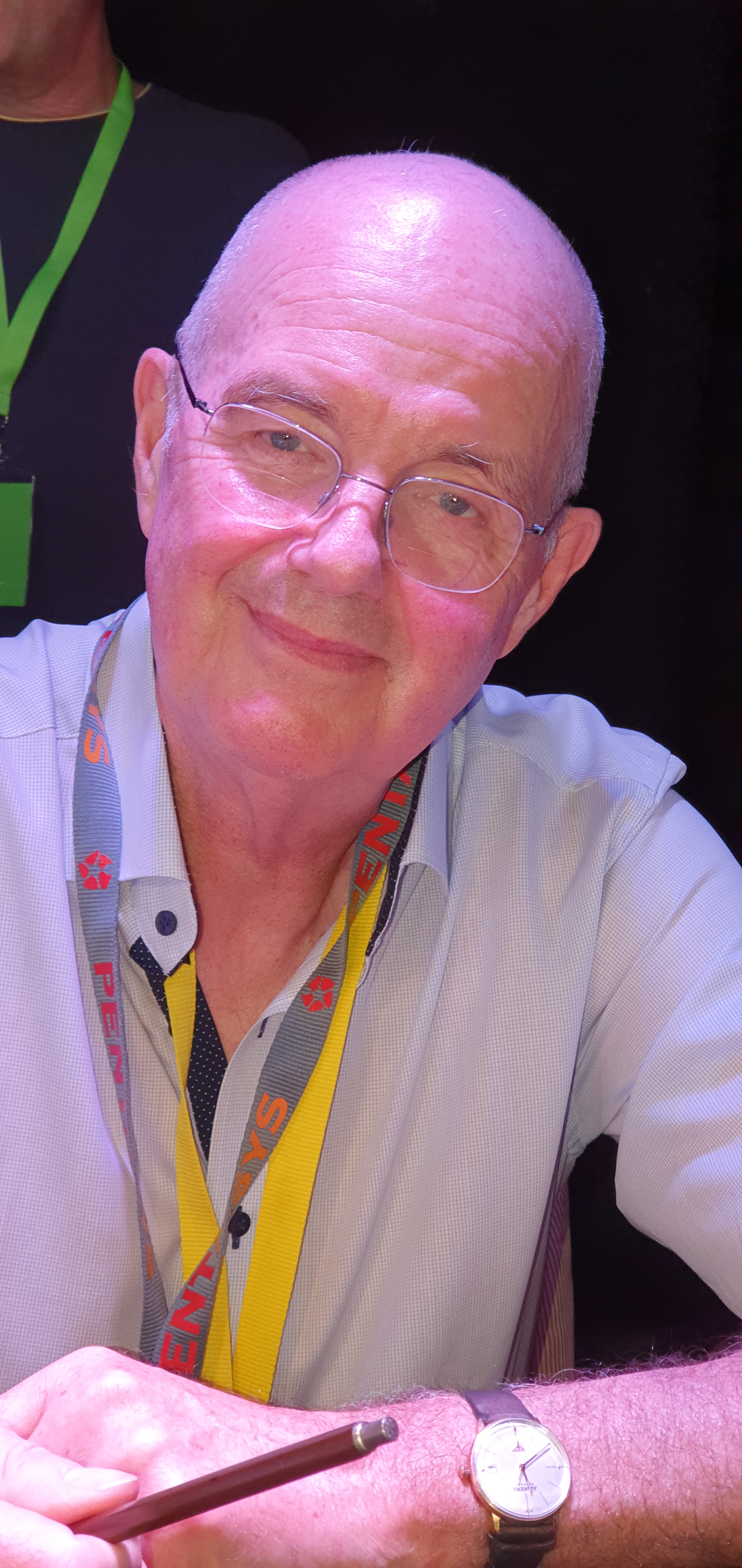
Matthias Schultheiss

Matthias Schultheiss (born 27 July 1946) is a German graphic novel artist. He is known for his works Bell's Theorem and The Sharks of Lagos published in the mid to late-1980s, especially in France.

== Life and work ==
Schultheiss was born in Nuremberg. He originally took an education in cabinet-making, then went on to study illustration at Hochschule für bildende Künste Hamburg. His first graphic novel called Trucker appeared in 1981 as a serial in the German magazine Comic-Reader, and he published two comic adaptations of short stories by Charles Bukowski. His 1985 graphic novel Kalter Krieg ("Cold War") was indexed as harmful to minors by the Federal Department for Media Harmful to Young Persons, not due to its depiction of sex and violence, but because of its bleak, pessimistic nihilism.

His breakthrough came when Franco-Belgian comics magazine L'Écho des savanes published his graphic novels Bell's Theorem and The Sharks of Lagos as serials from 1985 onwards. Both were reprinted in three volumes each by Éditions Albin Michel in France, Carlsen Verlag in Germany, and Bell's Theorem has been published in English by Catalan Communications. In 1986, he received the Max & Moritz Prize as Best German-Language Comic Artist.

In the early 1990s, Schultheiss as one of several European comic artists was contacted by Kodansha for a new series of manga-style comics by European artists to be called Im Zentrum des Wahnsinns ("In the Center of Madness"). When a lot of work had already gone into the project, Kodansha suddenly cancelled its plans, and Schultheiss's 400 pages he had drawn so far were never released (up until in May 2001, the German mail-order publisher Hummelcomic began issuing one page of it per day on its website). Schultheiss next intended to get on the American market in 1993 with his own superhero series, entitled Propellerman. But this turned out a flop, and for the rest of the 1990s, Schultheiss withdrew from making comics, only teaching graphics illustration classes in Hamburg, his city of residence, and occasionally wrote scripts for telefilms.

In 2008, he returned with two graphic novels originally published by Kodansha, "Woman on the River" and "Daddy", and in 2010, he published "Journey with Bill" at Glénat. They present a much brighter, more colorful, and more optimistic style compared to his bleak and darkly disturbing work of the 1980s and early 1990s.

== Main publications ==
=== German ===
- Kalter Krieg, Melzer 1985
- Die Wahrheit über Shelby
  - Lebenslänglich, Carlsen 1986
  - Die Verbindung, Carlsen 1987
  - Der Kontakt, Carlsen 1988
- Die Haie von Lagos
  - Schwarze Seelen, Carlsen 1987
  - Lamberts Beute, Carlsen 1988
  - Die Spur, Carlsen 1988
- Nighttaxi, Carlsen 1990
- Talk Dirty, 1991
- Reise mit Bill, Splitter 2010

=== French ===
- Guerres froides, Albin Michel 1985
- Le théorème de Bell
  - Le théorème de Bell, Albin Michel 1986
  - Le contact, Albin Michel 1988
  - La solution, Albin Michel 1990
- Le rêve du requin
  - La fourmilière du Lagos, Glénat 1986
  - Lagos connection, Glénat 1988
  - La Fiancée de la mort, Glénat 1990
- Night Taxi, Glénat 1990
- Sois vicieux, Delcourt 2010
- Le voyage avec Bill, Glénat 2010

=== English ===
- Bell's Theorem
  - Bell's Theorem #1: Lifer, Catalan Communications 1987
  - Bell's Theorem #2: The Connection, Catalan Communications 1988
  - Bell's Theorem #3: Contact, Catalan Communications 1989
- A Couple of Winos, Fantagraphics 1991
- Talk Dirty, Eros Comix 1992
- Propellerman, Dark Horse 1993
