= Kogaratsu =

- Main character Nakamura Kogaratsu with the series logo

Publication information
- Publisher: Dupuis; Spirou magazine
- Genre: Historical comics, adventure comics
- Publication date: 1982
- No. of issues: 13
- Main character: Nakamura Kogaratsu

Creative team
- Created by: Bosse & Michetz
- Written by: Bosse
- Artist: Michetz

Kogaratsu is a bande dessinée series created by the Belgian comics creators Bosse (pseudonym of Serge Bosmans) and Michetz (pseudonym of Marc Degroide).

== Overview ==
Kogaratsu is about a mercenary named Nakamura Kogaratsu. Caught in a fratricidal war, and confronted with superstitious farmers, Kogaratsu lives the way of the samurai: his honour, his weapons, and his love are the things dearest to him, in that exact order. And in the tumultuous Japan of the 17th century, honour is the small margin between life and death, wielding a weapon is a calling, and love is a weakness.

== Publication history ==
It was first published in the French Spirou magazine in 1982. The success of the series, written by Bosse and illustrated by Michetz, inspired then-illustrator and script writer Bosse to give up illustrating in order to focus solely on script-writing. Fourteen volumes of Kogaratsu have been published by Dupuis beginning in 1985:

0. "Volume Zero", a short story collection, titled Le Pont de nulle part (ISBN 2800118121) was published in 1991.

1. Le Mon au lotus de sang (1985) (ISBN 2800110643)
2. Le Trésor des Étas (1986) (ISBN 2800113936)
3. Le Printemps écartelé (1988) (ISBN 2800115785)
4. Le Dos du tigre(1992) (ISBN 2800119381)
5. Par-delà les cendres (1994) (ISBN 2800120940)
6. L'Homme sur la vague (1995) (ISBN 2800121823)
7. L'Autre moitié du ciel (1997) (ISBN 2800123125)
8. Sous le regard de la lune (1999) (ISBN 2800126620)
9. La Stratégie Des Phalènes (2000) (ISBN 2800128550)
10. Rouge ultime (2002) (ISBN 2800131195)
11. Fournaise (2008) (ISBN 978-2800140674)
12. Le protocole du Mal (2010) (ISBN 978-2800146621)
13. Taro (2014) (ISBN 978-2800151274)

A multi-volume compilation, L'Intégrale - Tome 1, was published in 2010. (ISBN 978-2800146638)

=== Translations ===
==== English ====
The only English translations to date are that of the first volume. UK-based Acme Press published it in 1987 as Kogaratsu: The Lotus of Blood (ISBN 1-8700-8415-2), and three years later the US-based Catalan Communications published it as Kogaratsu: The Bloody Lotus (ISBN 0-8741-6103-7) under their ComCat Comics imprint.

Catalan had planned in 1991 to publish the next two volumes, Treasure of Eta (ISBN 0-87416-131-2) and Spring of Betrayals (ISBN 0-87416-133-9), even obtaining ISBN numbers for them. However, the company entered bankruptcy the same year and the volumes never materialized.

==== Dutch ====
Dutch versions of all 14 volumes have been near-concurrently published by the same Dupuis.

1. De bloedlotus (1985) (ISBN 9031409618
2. De schat van de Eta (1986) (ISBN 9031411159)

==== German ====
German translations have been issued by Finix Comics e.V. They count the prequel/Volume Zero as number one, pushing the subsequent volumes' numbering down by one. (For example, the volume Taro is the 13th French but 14th German title.)

- (volume 12) Glutofen (2014) (ISBN 978-3941236974)
- (volume 13) Das Protokoll des Bösen (2015) (ISBN 978-3941236981)
- (volume 14) Taro (2015) (ISBN 978-3941236998)

==== Spanish ====
Spanish multi-volume compilations have been issued by Ponent Mon Comic.

- (compilation 1) (ISBN 978-1910856383)
- (compilation 2) (ISBN 978-1910856574)
- (compilation 3) (ISBN 978-1912097104)

== See also ==
• Belgian comics • Franco-Belgian comics
