= Squeak the Mouse =

Italian black comedy comics

- Squeak the Mouse #1, featuring the principal characters, Squeak the Mouse and the unnamed cat
- Author: Massimo Mattioli
- Launch date: August 1982
- Publisher: Éditions Albin Michel
- Genre(s): Black comedy, humor, erotic, horror, pantomime comics, adult comics

Squeak the Mouse is an Italian adult black comedy comic strip and later comic book created by artist Massimo Mattioli. The comic depicts attempts by its title character, the anthropomorphic Squeak the Mouse, to outwit a cat who is chasing him. The comic satirizes cartoon series such as Tom and Jerry, taking the content to extreme levels, which includes gore, horror, violence, and explicit sexual content.

Two issues of a Squeak the Mouse comic book were produced in 1984 and 1992, the first written from the perspective of the cat, who murders the title character, and the second, written from the perspective of Squeak, who murders the cat. Each issue features a zombie plotline and a pornographic section depicting one of the main characters in an orgy with several funny animal women. A previously unpublished third instalment was included in Coconino Press's 2019 collection titled Squeak the Mouse: The Trilogy.

== Overview ==
Squeak the Mouse is a parody of the cartoon series, Tom and Jerry. Although the style of the drawing is typical of children comics, Squeak indulges in graphic violence, gore, splatter and pornographic scenes.

The first issue of the series is written from the perspective of the cat, who is aggravated by Squeak the Mouse, and ultimately murders the title character. The cat goes to a party and unsuccessfully attempts to have sex with his girlfriend, and instead sleeps with another girl he meets at the party, Squeak the Mouse returns from the dead as a zombie and murders every one of the guests at the party, until the cat stops the mouse by murdering it with a blender. When the cat returns home, each of the party guests, revived as zombies, attempt to kill him, leading him to kill each of the undead in self-defense. The next day, the cat engages in an orgy with a number of beautiful women, but Squeak the Mouse returns once more and slaughters each of the women, leading the cat to kill Squeak once more before chasing after another mouse. The end of the issue assures readers that Squeak is really dead and will not return.

The second issue, Squeak the Mouse 2, begins with a duck who revives Squeak from the pages of the first Squeak the Mouse comic book. Squeak proceeds to read his own comic, and is horrified by his own murder, and decides to track down the cat and murder him. However, when Squeak confronts the cat at a screening of The Texas Chainsaw Massacre 2, the cat tricks Squeak into feeling sympathy for him, which allows the cat to briefly escape before being murdered by the mouse. As Squeak boards a plane heading to a tropical island, the cat returns as a zombie and crashes the plane, killing all of the passengers except Squeak, who escapes, and swims to the nearest island, where a pair of women awaken him by performing oral sex on Squeak, leading to another orgy sequence. The cat turns up on the island and slaughters the women, and Squeak destroys the cat, leaving only its separated bones, which are found by a horror film-loving child, who brings the remains home and reassembles them. The skeleton cat slaughters the child and his family, and once again goes after Squeak, who finally gets rid of the cat for good, but decides to antagonize another cat.

In the third issue, Squeak the Mouse 3, an alien watches the events at the ending of the second issue, and gathers the remains of the cat to revive for amusement. Meanwhile, Squeak has sex with a random woman he meets while out walking, but is abducted by the alien. The alien laughs until the cat manages to catch Squeak again and kills him before knocking out the alien. In return, the alien freezes the cat and Squeak's remains, and returns to its home planet. The alien gives the cat to another alien as a gift to cook, but the cat wakes up and murders the other alien. Squeak meanwhile revives and kills the alien who abducted them. The cat escapes the planet using the alien's craft, but is soon attacked by the zombie alien, and ends up having to decapitate it. Just then, Squeak attacks the cat, but is tricked into being shot out of an airlock before the spaceship crashes. The cat is attacked by worm-like monsters before fleeing to the ship, and being attacked by the zombie alien once more, ends up feeding it to the worm monsters. An alien explorer rescues the cat, but is killed by Squeak. After a long chase, the cat manages to evade Squeak and steals the explorer's ship to escape, while another alien explorer lands and is killed by Squeak. Squeak chases the cat in the other explorer's ship, and the cat crashes on another world, being revived and then having sex with his nurse. Soon, Squeak kills the hospital staff, and the cat once again steals a ship to head to Earth. However, Squeak sneaks on board, and the ship crashes on Earth. The cat and Squeak get away in escape pods, and after landing, the cat finally kills Squeak before chasing after another mouse.

== Publication history ==
The comic was first published in the underground comics magazine Frigidaire starting from 1982. The stories were later collected in an eponymous volume in 1984 by Éditions Albin Michel and it was initially intended as a standalone volume. It had a sequel (Squeak the Mouse 2) published in 1992 also by Éditions Albin Michel and Sefam, Paris. Fantagraphics released all of the stories in a collection on April 12, 2022.

== Controversy ==
On August 1, 1985, New York harbor officials confiscated the comic publication on the grounds that it was pornographic, but a court later overturned that decision. According to Bernd Metz of Catalan Communications, the book's USA publisher, Squeak the Mouse was ruled not obscene "because it failed the third test of the law... the Miller test as it's called... in that it did not exceed the community standards."

== Legacy ==
The comics are considered to be an apparent inspiration for Matt Groening's The Itchy & Scratchy Show.

== See also ==
- The Itchy & Scratchy Show
- Happy Tree Friends
- Tom and Jerry
- Superjail!
- Black Cat Detective
