= Enrique Sánchez Abulí =

Spanish comics author (born 1945)

Abulí
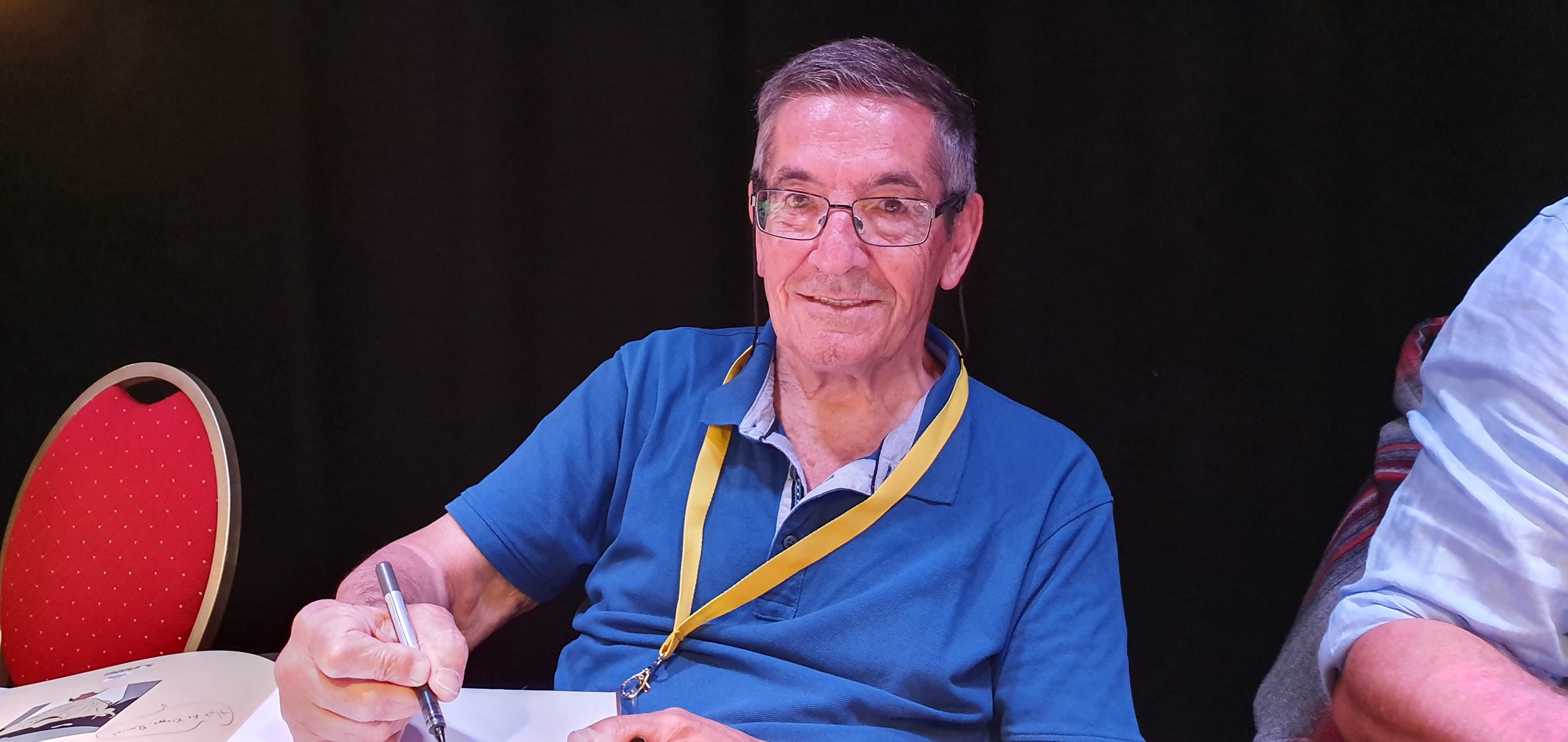
- Born: Enrique Sánchez Abulí; 20 February 1945 (age 81) Palau-del-Vidre, France
- Area: Writer
- Notable works: Historias Negras; Torpedo; L'Albinos
- Awards: Full list

Enrique Sánchez Abulí (born 20 February 1945) is a Spanish comics author, well known for his participation in the Spanish comics industry. His most famous work is the darkly comical gangster comics saga Torpedo in collaboration with Jordi Bernet.

== Biography ==
Abulí was born in Palau-del-Vidre, in France.

Having tried in a number of professions in various locations in the world, Abulí began his career as a translator and writer of comics in Spain in the early 1980s. With the influential publisher Josep Toutain, Abulí collaborated with the veteran artist Alex Toth to conceive Torpedo 1936. The relationship was short-lived, as Toth withdrew from the project due to creative differences in 1981. He was replaced by the artist Jordi Bernet which started a very productive working relationship and resulted in a long series. Torpedo achieved popular international success, an Angoulême International Comics Festival award, and eventually a dedicated comics magazine of its own named Luca Torelli es Torpedo in 1991.

Later collaborations with Bernet include De vuelta a casa, La naturaleza de la bestia: Ab Irato and Snake: por un punado de dolares. He has also published work with artists such as Marcelo Perez, Oswal, Christian Rossi, Darko Perovic and Riff Reb's.

== Bibliography of French publications ==
Luca Torelli es Torpedo Issue No.1 (1991)

- Torpedo, with Jordi Bernet
  - 1. Tuer c'est vivre (1983, with Alex Toth, L'Echo des Savanes, ISBN 2-226-01783-6)
  - 2. Mort au comptant (1984, L'Echo des Savanes, ISBN 2-226-01951-0)
  - 3. Ni fleurs ni couronnes (1984, Albin Michel, ISBN 2-226-02213-9)
  - 4. Chaud devant! (1985, Albin Michel, ISBN 2-226-02297-X)
  - 5. En voiture, Simone (1986, Albin Michel, ISBN 2-226-02729-7)
  - 6. Sale temps! (1987, Albin Michel, ISBN 2-226-02743-2)
  - 7. Sing-Sing Blues (1987, Albin Michel, ISBN 2-87695-034-0)
  - 8. Monnaie de singe (1988, Comics USA, ISBN 2-87695-043-X)
  - 9. Debout les morts (1988, Comics USA, ISBN 2-87695-054-5)
  - 10. Dieu reconnaîtra les tiens! (1990, Comics USA, ISBN 2-87695-114-2)
  - 11. Rien ne sert de mourir (1994, Comics USA, ISBN 2-87695-225-4)
  - 12. Devine qui va morfler ce soir... (1995, Comics USA, ISBN 2-87695-234-3)
  - 13. Cuba (1997, Glénat, ISBN 2-7234-2114-7)
  - 14. Adieu, gueule d'amour (1999, Glénat, ISBN 2-7234-2672-6)
  - 15. Affreux, sales, bêtes, méchants et immondes (2004, Toth, ISBN 2-913999-10-7)
- Alex Magnum with Genies
  - Le bras de la loi (1986, Magic Strip, ISBN 2-8035-0137-3 )
  - La loi du ghetto (1989, Delcourt, ISBN 2-906187-23-2)
- Retour (De vuelta a casa) (1986, with Jordi Bernet, Gilou, ISBN 2-905146-06-0)
- Histoires Noires (Historias Negras) (1988, with Jordi Bernet, ISBN 2-87695-044-8)
- Joe Breakdown (1989, with Eric Puech, Comics USA, ISBN 2-87695-063-4)
- Parlez-moi de mort (La naturaleza de la bestia) (1989, with Jordi Bernet, Comics USA, ISBN 2-87695-100-2)
- Sur Liste Noire (1996, with Jordi Bernet, Vents d'Ouest, ISBN 2-86967-503-8)
- L'Albinos (1997, with Marcelo Perez, Dargaud, ISBN 2-205-04597-0)
- Snake: Double paire (1998, with Jordi Bernet, Albin Michel, ISBN 2-226-10629-4)
- Sombres destins (1998, with Oswal, L'Echo des Savanes, ISBN 2-226-09593-4)
- Capitaine La Guibole (2000, with Christian Rossi, Albin Michel, ISBN 2-226-10933-1)
- Glam et Comet, Purée cosmique (2005, with Riff Reb's, Albin Michel, ISBN 2-226-15533-3)

== Awards ==
- 1986: Angoulême Best Foreign Album Award for Torpedo: Chaud devant
- 1994: Nominated for the Harvey Award for Best American Edition of Foreign Material for Torpedo
- 1995: Nominated for the Harvey Award for Best American Edition of Foreign Material for Torpedo

== Sources ==
- Abulí publications in l'Écho des Savanes BDoubliées (in French)
- Abulí albums Bedetheque (in French)
