= Yoko Tsuno =

Science fiction comic album series by Roger Leloup

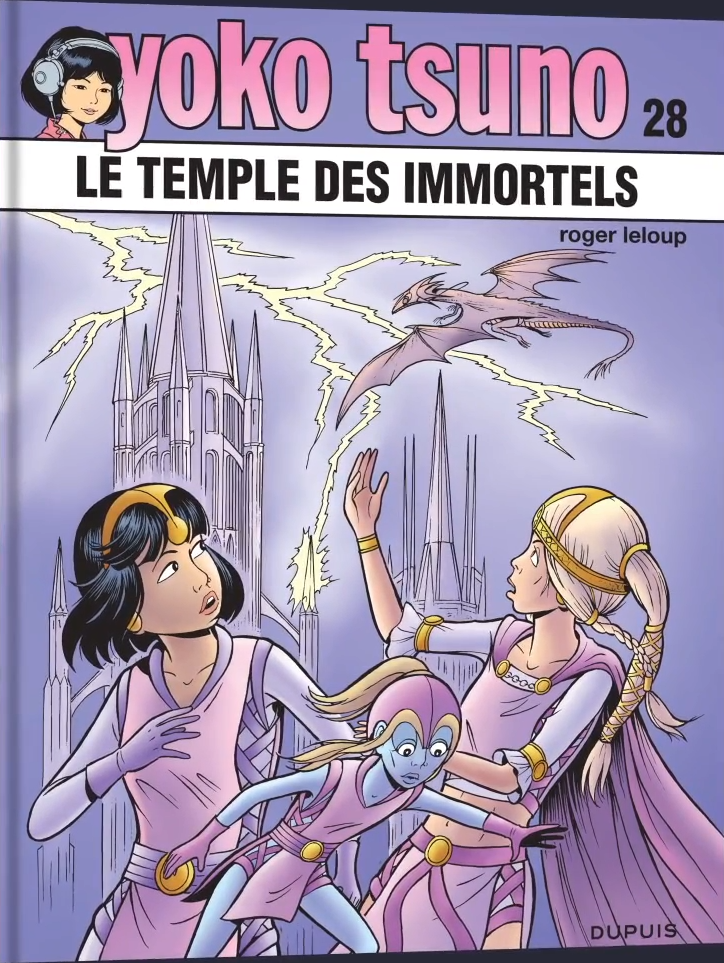
- Cover of album 28 (2017)

Publication information
- Publisher: Dupuis (French and Dutch); Cinebook (English)
- Format: Comics album
- Genre: Science fiction, Adventure
- Publication date: 1970
- No. of issues: 30 (in Dutch and French); 16 (in English)

Creative team
- Created by: Roger Leloup

Yoko Tsuno is a comics album series created by the Belgian writer Roger Leloup published by Dupuis in Spirou magazine since its debut in 1970. Through thirty volumes, the series tell the adventures of Yoko Tsuno, an electrical engineer of Japanese origin surrounded by her close friends, Vic Video and Pol Pitron (see Yoko Tsuno characters). Their adventures bring them to, among other places, Belgium (Bruges), Germany, Scotland, Japan, Hong Kong, Indonesia and also into outer space. The stories are heavily technology driven, with concepts like robot dragons (Le Dragon de Hong Kong), suspended animation (La Frontière de la vie), time travel (La Spirale du temps and others), and even an alien species called the Vineans. Despite the often exotic settings and science-fiction plot lines, the stories generally remain realistic on the personal level between the characters and friendship, love and spirituality are some of the key themes of the series. The art is drawn in ligne claire style, although having originally started out in the Marcinelle style. When depicting real-world settings, Leloup aspires to be as true to reality as possible, with places like Burg Katz or Rothenburg ob der Tauber depicted with almost photographic skill.

== Publication history ==
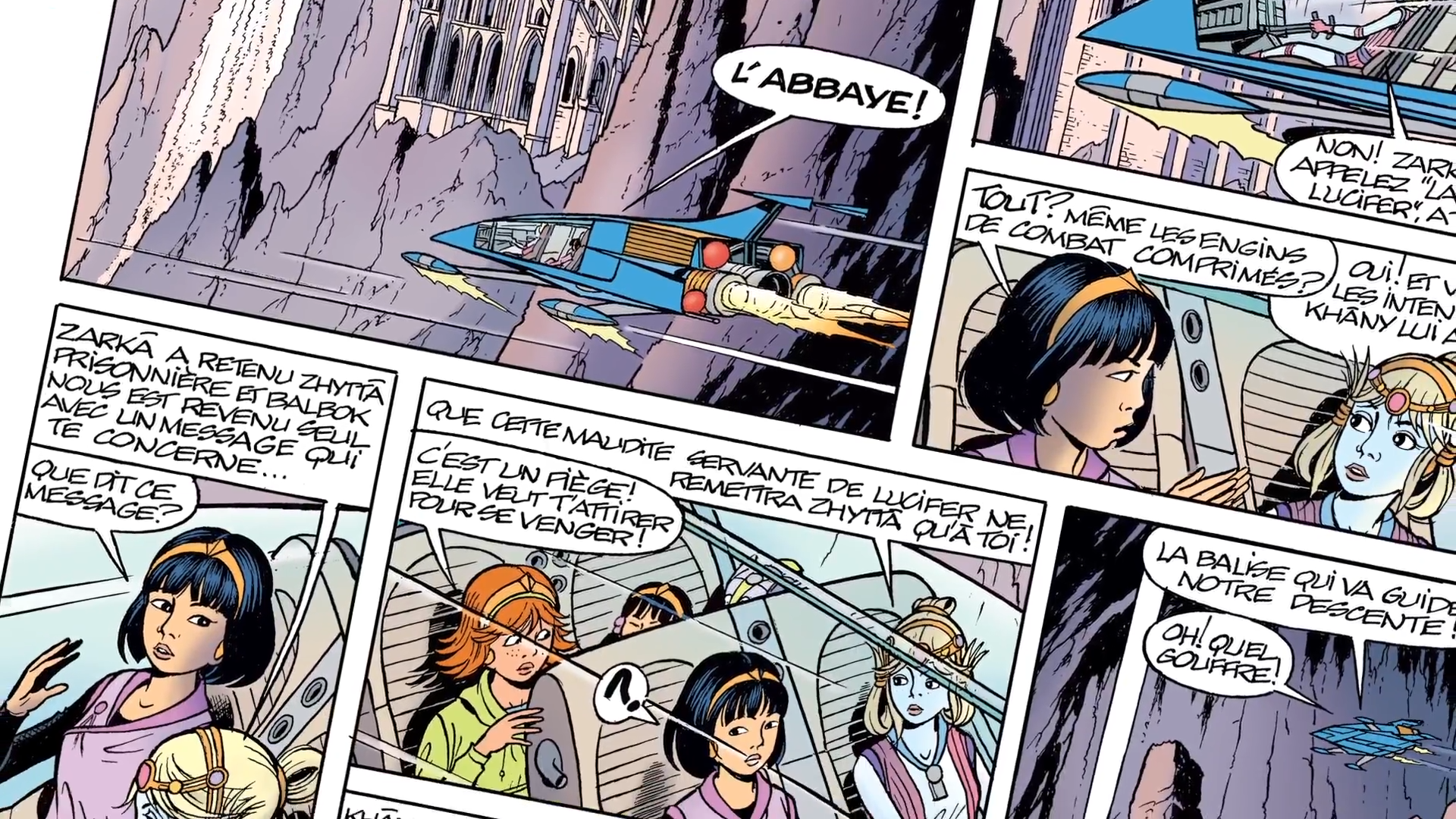
Extract of Le Temple des immortels, 2017

Yoko Tsuno first appeared in the Franco-Belgian comics magazine Spirou on September 24, 1970 with the 8 page short Hold–up en hi–fi. This and the following two shorter works La belle et la bête and Cap 351 served as precursors for the first full-length Yoko Tsuno adventure, Le trio de l'étrange serialised in Spirou from May 13, 1971. Staying with Spirou for the following 30 years, the series still appears in the magazine to date. The series has accumulated 30 albums and has been collected in nine integral compilations.

== Characters ==
=== Yoko Tsuno ===
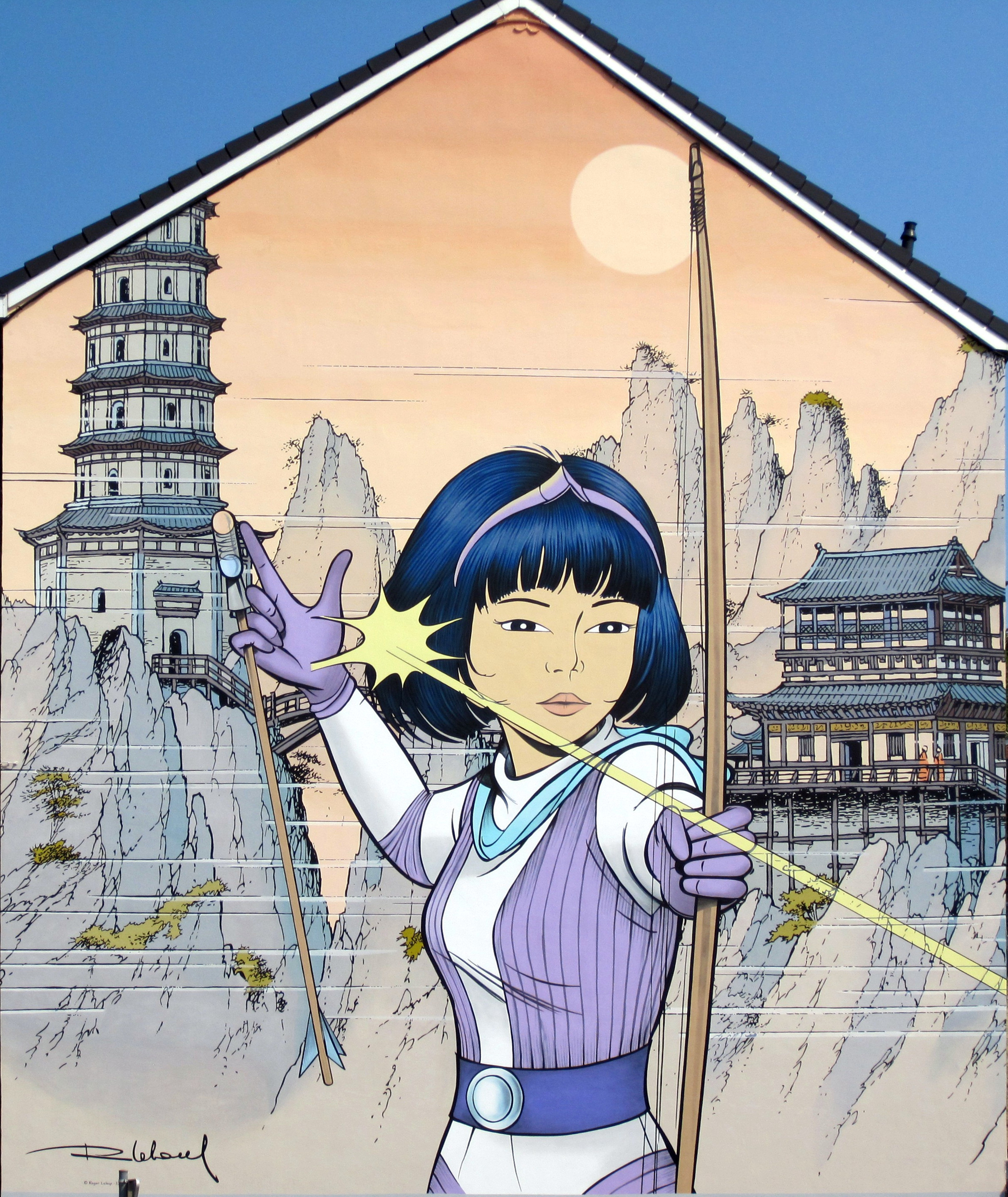
The main character on a mural in Verviers

Yoko Tsuno is an electronics engineer, raised in Japan but now living in Belgium. She is quite compassionate and has a knack for making friends. Yoko is also a skilled scuba diver, holds a black belt in aikido, and can pilot jets, gliders and helicopters. This wide range of competences, together with her near-flawless behaviour, makes Yoko fall into the classic category of a competent woman. The flaw she does admit to having is the typically Japanese trait of valuing personal honour highly, which leads her at times to be trusting to the point of blindness. Yoko Tsuno's first name was inspired by Japanese actress Yoko Tani.

=== Vic Video ===
Vic Video (Dutch: Ben Beeld, but sometimes also referred to as Max): He has a strong personality, and is a close friend of Yoko (whom he seems to be in love with, though this is only hinted at). Before meeting Yoko, he directed live TV shows. He is often the voice of reason and prudence moderating Yoko's impulsiveness. Vic appears in all albums except Aventures électroniques, L'Or du Rhin and La Pagode des brumes.

=== Pol Pitron ===
Pol Pitron (Dutch: Paul Pola, German: Knut Knolle) is the comic relief of the trio. His name comes from French "pitre", literally "clown". Before meeting Yoko, he worked as a camera operator under direction of Vic. Pol is often lazy and grumpy, as well as a real gourmet. He is also playful and thus quite fond of children, and during a time travel adventure to 16th century Bruges, he gains a fiancée named Mieke, which brings his childish side down by some degrees (L'Astrologue de Bruges).
Pol appears in all albums except La Pagode des brumes, although he appears in only two stories of Aventures électroniques. Where almost all other characters in the comics are drawn realistically anatomically speaking, in the early albums, Pol's nose and eyes are cartoonishly large and round.

=== Khany ===
Khany is a member of the extraterrestrial race of Vineans, who left their planet when it faced destruction by its twin suns and erected secret subterranean colonies on various habitable planets, including Earth. As of the end of La Forge de Vulcain and the fall of Karpan's leadership, she is also their undeclared leader who directs the return of the Vineans from Earth to Vinea. She is also undertaking expeditions to find lost Vinean colonies. Like Vic, she is quite careful in her actions. Khany appears in Le Trio de l'étrange, La Forge de Vulcain, Les Trois soleils de Vinéa, Les Titans, La Lumière d'Ixo, Les Archanges de Vinéa, Les Exilés de Kifa, La Porte des âmes, La Servante de Lucifer and Le Secret de Khâny.

=== Poky ===
Khany's younger sister, and originally her twin sister, who was revived from suspended animation much later than Khany after their arrival on Earth and has thus remained a child. She is quite attached to Yoko and has become close friends with Morning Dew. She appears, nearly always at her sister's side, in Le Trio de l'étrange, La Forge de Vulcain, Les Trois Soleils de Vinéa, Les Titans, La Lumière d'Ixo, Les Archanges de Vinéa, Les Exilés de Kifa, La Porte des âmes, La Servante de Lucifer and Le Secret de Khâny.

=== Rosée du Matin ===
Rosée du Matin (Morning Dew; Dutch: Roosje; German: Morgentau) is Yoko's adopted Chinese daughter, as of Le Dragon de Hong Kong. The child of two biologists who experimented with the artificial enlargement of animals, she was orphaned when her parents perished in a storm. She had been raised by her grandfather, but due to his deteriorating health, he entrusted guardianship to Yoko. She has so far also participated in Yoko's time travel exploits and her trips into outer space. Rosée appears in all albums from Le Dragon de Hong Kong onwards. She was inspired by Leloup's daughter, adopted from Korea.

=== Ingrid Hallberg ===
A German organist who becomes one of Yoko's closest friends after Yoko helped solve the mystery of her father's murder in L'Orgue du Diable. While she has never met them, Ingrid also knows about Yoko's connection to the Vineans (Le Temple des immortels). She has since appeared in La Frontière de la vie, Le Feu de Wotan, L'Or du Rhin and Le Temple des immortels.

=== Monya ===
Monya is a fourteen-year-old time traveler from 3872, whom Yoko meets during the events described in La Spirale du temps. After changing history during this adventure, Monya is unable to return to her native time. She is adopted by Yoko's cousin and the two girls become fast friends. With the help of Monya's time machine, the translateur, Yoko and her friends undertake several time-travelling adventures.

=== Emilia ===
A spirited fourteen-year-old girl of Scottish-Russian descent, who appears in the series as of Le Septième Code. While she is not a skilled violin player as her mother was (and wanted her daughter to be), she demonstrates a natural aptitude for piloting. In La Servante de Lucifer, she is also revealed to have some latent telepathic talent.

=== Myna and Angela ===
Two female Vinean nursery androids. While Myna is an older construct from before the Vinean exodus (Les Exilés de Kifa), Angela was built as a gift for Morning Dew based on a children's book Morning Dew had left behind during a previous visit on Vinea (La Servante de Lucifer).

=== Akina ===
A benevolent artificial intelligence which was once the controlling element in a spacecraft owned by Gobol, the antagonist of Les Exilés de Kifa. When Yoko uses the ship to escape Kifa, the AI accepts her as her new master after Yoko christens her with the first name (of an old school rival) that comes into her mind. A copy of Akina accompanies Yoko in subsequent stories, stored in a hand computer.

=== Bonnie ===
A young half-African girl from Kenya who was sired by Emilia's great-granduncle in the early 20th century and taken in by his brother (Sir Archibald, Emilia's great-grandfather) and sister-in-law. Not feeling at home in Europe because of her mixed-race heritage and the resulting social prejudice, she accompanied Yoko and Emilia, who had journeyed into the past, back to the 21st century, where she has taken up permanent residence (Le Maléfice de l'améthyste).

== Synopsis ==
Yoko Tsuno first meets Vic and Pol when they catch her trying to break into a laboratory in Le Trio de l'étrange. The moment the men confront her, the owner of the laboratory explains that he hired the Japanese girl to test a burglar alarm system. Vic, intrigued by Yoko's knowledge in electrical engineering and planning to do an independent television production with Pol as the cameraman, asks Yoko to come along. However, their filming operation turns out to become the first of a whole series of strange adventures, as they stumble upon a secret underground enclave inhabited by a highly advanced, blue-skinned people, the Vineans. This adventure forges a strong friendship between the three, inspiring them to stay together as the "Strange Trio", who join each other on surreal adventures on Earth, in outer space, and even the depths of bygone times.

The main characters are based in Belgium, although adventures take place around the world and even in the Vinean solar system, 2,500,000 light years away. When the stories are Earth-based, they mostly take place in existing settings, such as the German locations Burg Katz and Rothenburg ob der Tauber, Hong Kong, or the Belgian city of Bruges.

== Books ==
=== Albums ===
#	# UK	Title	Year	Synopsis	ISBN
1	7	Le Trio de l'étrange (The Curious Trio)	1972	Vic and Pol discover Yoko as she is testing an alarm system, and Vic hires her for his TV station. While making a documentary about a river, the three are sucked down a pipe and captured by the Vineans. Alongside the Vinean Khany, the trio must battle the Vineans' rogue central computer and its pawn, the security chief Karpan.	2-8001-0666-2
2	8	L'Orgue du Diable (The Devil's Organ)	1973	While traveling the Rhine River, Yoko and Pol rescue an organist named Ingrid Hallberg from attempted murder. Through her, they learn of a legendary, destructive infrasonic instrument named the Devil's Organ and of an insidious plot to use it in a claim of inheritance.	2-8001-0667-0
3	9	La Forge de Vulcain (Vulcan's Forge)	1973	Yoko travels to Martinique to investigate a strange magnetic ore that turns out to be part of magma pipeline, again part of the machinations of the Vinean Karpan to create a new continent for the Vineans on the Earth's surface.	2-8001-0668-9
4		Aventures électroniques (Electronic Adventures)	1974	A series of older short stories, most of which involve the criminal use of high-tech equipment. Includes Hold-up in hi-fi, L'Ange de Noël ("The Christmas Angel"), La Belle et la Bête ("The Beauty and the Beast"), Cap 351, Du miel pour Yoko ("Honey for Yoko") and L'Araignée qui volait ("The Thief Spider"). The cover was made a few years after the stories and displays a striking style difference compared to the inside.	2-8001-0669-7
5	10	Message pour l'éternité (Message for Eternity)	1975	After a radio antenna in Pleumeur-Bodou picks up the signal of a long-disappeared Handley "Heracles" aeroplane, Yoko travels to a crater on the Soviet-Afghanistan border to investigate and recover its cargo of top secret papers for the British government. But a sinister secret agent and a mad hermit, the last survivor of the plane's crew, pose a hazard not only for her mission, but also her life.	2-8001-0670-0
6	11	Les Trois Soleils de Vinéa (The Three Suns of Vinea)	1976	Yoko, Vic and Pol travel to Vinea with Khany to investigate the habitability of the planet, but find that its survivors are now governed by a corrupted artificial intelligence.	2-8001-0671-9
7	1	La Frontière de la vie (On the Edge of Life)	1977	Yoko investigates a vampire-like apparition in Rothenburg ob der Tauber that has stricken her friend Ingrid with a strange disease. But this is only the side effect of a desperate father's plan to reawaken his daughter from over thirty years of hibernation.	2-8001-0672-7
8	12	Les Titans (The Titans)	1978	Yoko, Khany and their friends are prompted to investigate a swamp region on Vinea where a giant insectoid race using artificially reinforced exoskeletons dwells.	2-8001-0592-5
9	4	La Fille du vent (The Daughter of the Wind)	1979	Yoko goes to Japan to visit her father, who is researching the creation of artificial tornadoes but is being threatened by his rival Kazuki, who wants to use the tornado machine as a weapon.	2-8001-0633-6
10	13	La Lumière d'Ixo (The Light of Ixo)	1980	Yoko and Khany investigate a mysterious light that appears on the moon Ixo every five years, which turns out to be at the center of a conflict among the descendants of Vinean exiles working on Ixo to supply their city located on a dead astronomical body with energy.	2-8001-0687-5
11	2	La Spirale du temps (The Time Spiral)	1981	When visiting her cousin in Borneo, Yoko finds a girl from the distant future who has traveled back in time to stop the discovery of antimatter.	2-8001-0744-8
12	3	La Proie et l'ombre (The Prey and the Ghost)	1982	While in Scotland, Yoko runs into Cecilia, a disturbed young woman who is apparently regularly visited by her mother's ghost. But Yoko finds out that Cecilia is merely the victim of a murderous plot which might claim Cecilia's life as it did her mother's.	2-8001-0908-4
13	14	Les Archanges de Vinéa (The Archangels of Vinea)	1983	Yoko and Poky discover a submerged Vinean city run by a despotic queen. The only aid she receives is from one of the Archangels, a group of androids opposed to the queen's tyranny.	2-8001-0971-8
14	15	Le Feu de Wotan (Wotan's Fire)	1984	Yoko investigates Ingrid's discovery of a fearsome lightning-based weapon.	2-8001-1029-5
15	16	Le Canon de Kra (The Cannon of Kra)	1985	Yoko is tasked to discover the whereabouts of a giant railway cannon, which disappeared while being transported to Japan during World War II, before a madman can use it on the government of Kampong.	2-8001-1092-9
16	5	Le Dragon de Hong Kong (The Dragon of Hong Kong)	1986	Yoko and her new young friend Morning Dew must deal with both a giant lizard bred for an abandoned movie project and a giant mechanical dragon attacking Hong Kong.	2-8001-1378-2
17	6	Le Matin du monde (The Morning of the World)	1988	Yoko and Monya must deal with the aftermath of a time-travelling expedition that nets an Indonesian artifact, causing a temple dancer to be sentenced to death.	2-8001-1585-8
18	17	Les Exilés de Kifa (The Refugees of Kifa)	1991	With the help of the nursery android Myna, Yoko must stop the satellite-city Kifa from colliding with Vinea.	2-8001-1748-6
19	18	L'Or du Rhin (The Rhine Gold)	1993	Yoko is employed as a secretary by Kazuki, who is striking a deal with some German businessmen; a plot ensues which involves androids, the luxury train Rheingold Express, and nuclear warheads.	2-8001-1999-3
20	19	L'Astrologue de Bruges (The Astrologer of Bruges)	1994	Yoko, Monya, Morning Dew and company travel to the 16th century to discover the mystery of an ancient painting depicting Yoko and Monya, only to find themselves pawns in a sinister scheme to reintroduce the Black Death into the world.	2-8001-2101-7
21		La Porte des âmes (The Gate of Souls)	1996	Yoko and friends discover the remains of the Vinean colony Ultima, now inhabited by a race who believes in technologically forced reincarnation.	2-8001-2340-0
22		La Jonque céleste (The Celestial Barge)	1998	During a visit to China, Yoko uses archaeological finds to discover the tomb of the third wife of Emperor Chen Tsong, a young girl who bears many similarities to Rosée.	2-8001-2587-X
23		La Pagode des brumes (The Pagoda of the Mists)	2001	In a continuation of the events of La Jonque céleste, Sin-Yi, now living in the present, pines for her servant girl Mei-Li, causing Monya to go back in time to retrieve her against Yoko's wishes.	2-8001-2948-4
24		Le Septième Code (The Seventh Code)	2005	While traveling in the Amazon, Yoko narrowly avoids a plane crash while dealing with Krüger and Comtesse Olga, Germans who need a chess riddle solved to unlock a missile silo.	2-8001-3762-2
25		La Servante de Lucifer (The Servant of Lucifer)	2010	Upon Cecilia's request, Yoko and Emilia travel to Scotland to investigate a female robot trapped in a medieval crypt. Upon waking her, Yoko and Emilia meet with the Vineans to organize a trip to bring the robot back to the Center of the Earth ... to meet her master, Lucifer!	978-2-8001-4775-8 (FR); 978-90-314-3090-1 (NL)
26		Le Maléfice de l'améthyste (The Amethyst Hex)	2012	Emilia and Yoko receive letters from Gloria McDougal, Emilia's long-deceased great grand-aunt, which are dated 1935 and in which she thanks them for saving her life. The encounter with Gloria's fiance, the inventor of a time machine, leads to an adventure back in the 1930s to chase an allegedly cursed amethyst, a lost treasure of the House of Romanov and the cause of Gloria's peril.	978-2800148625 (FR)
27		Le Secret de Khâny (Khany's Secret)	2015	After being attacked at Loch Castle Cottage, and to prevent further disasters, Yoko travels to Mars to find the perpetrator. During her journey, she discovers that the Vineans in the past have been undertaking genetic experiments under Karpan's command to make their kind compatible to Earth's living conditions, including the creation of hybrid people combining human and Vinean DNA. The only two survivors of these experiments are now threatening to destroy all life on Earth, and Yoko notices that Khany is keeping a secret from her.	978-2800163390 (FR)
28		Le Temple des immortels (The Temple of the Immortals)	2017	At Loch Castle, inside a cave near the remains of a medieval castle, Yoko, Vic and Pol join Lathy, who tells them that Zarka, the servant of Lucifer, wants Yoko to join her. Next Iseut, Yoko and Emilia find themselves in another cave and meet Goliath, the dragon of Zarkâ, who takes them to his mistress, in the temple of the immortals. Yoko confronts Brother Marzin.	978-2-8001-6953-8 (FR)
29		Anges et faucons (Angels and Falcons)	2019	While visiting the local cemetery, Emilia discovers the story of two children killed nearby in an accident in 1935. Trying to prevent the tragedy, she ends up back in time together with Yoko and Bonnie. Soon after, Yoko is requested for a special delivery that is, however, sabotaged by an unknown enemy.	979-1-0347-3803-8 (FR)
30		Les Gémeaux de Saturne (The Twins of Saturn)	2022	Khany takes Yoko and her friends to the rings of Saturn. There they want to explore a part of the comet that seems to contain water and oxygen. They receive a cryptic message asking to rescue Rya.	(FR)
31		L'Aigle des Highlands (The Eagle from the Highlands)	2024	Yoko comes across monks searching the ruins of an old abbey, leading her to unravel a mystery reaching into a distant past.	978-2808504942 (FR)

=== L'Écume de l'aube ===
Roger Leloup also wrote a novel with Yoko as the heroine, published in 1991: L'Écume de l'aube (The Froth of Dawn) (ISBN 2-203-38033-0), which relates the childhood and youth of Yoko Tsuno.

== Translations ==
Books from the Yoko Tsuno series have been translated from French to sixteen languages: Basque, Catalan, Chinese, Danish, Dutch, English, Finnish, German, Greek, Icelandic, Indonesian, Italian, Norwegian, Portuguese, Spanish and Swedish.

=== English translations ===
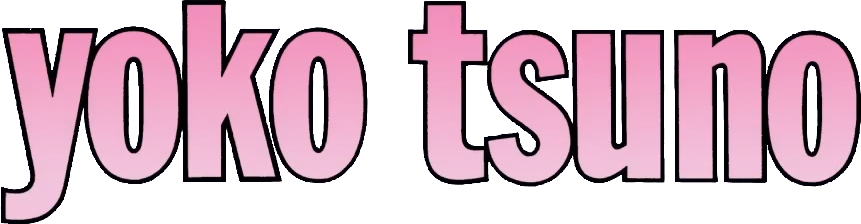
Series logo, used in the original and most translated versions

As of 2015, only a limited number of Yoko Tsuno comics have been translated to English. Books #3 and 6 (La Forge de Vulcain and Les Trois Soleils de Vinéa) were released in English in 1989 under the series title, The Adventures of Yoko, Vic and Paul by Catalan Communications under their "Comcat" line. Some liberties were taken in the translation to English. For example, Yoko's last name was changed to "Suno", Khany was renamed "Kani" and the Vineans became "Vinans" from the planet "Vina". Plot transitions between individual episodes were also altered; for instance, at the conclusion of The Prey and the Ghost (original issue #12), Vic tells Yoko in the original version that he was contacted by Khany, leading to the events of issue #13, The Archangels of Vinea; in the English translation, instead he tells her that it was her father who gave him a message for her, which in the Comcat line of continuity would lead to Daughter of the Wind (original issue #9).

Comcat planned next on reprinting books nos. 8, 10, 13, and possibly no. 17, but the company went under.

Eighteen books have been translated into English and published by Cinebook Ltd:

- On the Edge of Life (La Frontière de la vie), published July 2007, ISBN 978-1-905460-32-8
- The Time Spiral (La Spirale du temps), published January 2008, ISBN 978-1-905460-43-4
- The Prey and the Ghost (La Proie et l'ombre), published July 2008, ISBN 978-1-905460-56-4
- Daughter of the Wind (La Fille du Vent), published July 2009, ISBN 978-1-905460-94-6
- The Dragon of Hong Kong (Le Dragon de Hong Kong), published July 2010, ISBN 978-1-84918-041-2
- The Morning of the World (Le Matin du Monde), published June 2011, ISBN 978-1-84918-082-5
- The Curious Trio (Le Trio de l'étrange), published July 2012, ISBN 978-1-84918-127-3
- The Devil's Organ (L'Orgue du Diable), published July 2013, ISBN 978-1-84918-164-8
- The Forge of Vulcan (La Forge de Vulcain), published August 2014, ISBN 978-1-84918-197-6
- Message for Eternity (Message pour l'éternité), published August 2015, ISBN 978-1-84918-251-5
- The Three Suns of Vinea (Les Trois Soleils de Vinéa), published May 2016, ISBN 978-1-84918-302-4
- The Titans (Les Titans), published May 2017, ISBN 978-1-84918-350-5
- The Light of Ixo (La Lumière d'Ixo), published April 2018, ISBN 978-1-84918-392-5
- The Archangels of Vinea (Les Archanges de Vinéa), published May 2019, ISBN 978-1-84918-438-0
- Wotan's Fire (Le Feu de Wotan), published May 2020, ISBN 978-1-84918-536-3
- The Cannon of Kra (Le Canon de Kra), published May 2021, ISBN 978-1-80044-019-7
- The Exiles of Kifa (Les Exilés de Kifa), published May 2022, ISBN 978-1-80044-065-4
- The Rhine Gold (L'Or du Rhin), published May 2023, ISBN 978-1-80044-093-7

=== Chinese translations ===
The Hong Kong–based Bayard Press Asia–Le Grain de Seneve Publishing Co. Ltd has published two Yoko stories in Chinese:

- Le Dragon de Hong Kong to 大龍的秘密 (The Secret of Great Dragon), and
- Le Matin du monde to 巴里島時光歷險 (Time-venture of Bali) in the 90's.

The series title for these albums was changed to 海羽傳奇 (The Legacy of Yoko Tsuno).

== See also ==
- Belgian comics
- Franco-Belgian comics
- Ligne claire
- Brussels' Comic Book Route

== Sources ==
=== General references ===
- Yoko Tsuno publications in Spirou BDoubliées (in French) IA copy
