= Tex Arcana =

1981-85 graphic serial by John Findley

- Art by John Findley from Tex Arcana

Publication information
- Publisher: Heavy Metal (magazine)
- Publication date: March 1981 – 1985

Creative team
- Written by: John Findley
- Artist: John Findley

Tex Arcana is a graphic serial that appeared in American comics magazine Heavy Metal, beginning with the March 1981 issue and continuing intermittently through 1985. It was written and drawn by John Findley.

Initially, the series was conceived as an adult-oriented parody of horror and Old West genres, combining standard vampire, werewolf (or, in this case, "werecoyote"), and goblin characters with classic Western themes, using a format loosely based on the EC Comics horror publications of the 1950s. It strove toward a goal of combining humor with genuine horror.

== Plot ==
The story is about the town of Hangman's Corners, its eccentric population and the peculiar and somewhat terrifying complications visited upon them by a variety of beings. Each episode was introduced by the deceased "Old Claim Jumper". The series is divided into three arcs.

The first arc is about a vampire who seeks help from Beyond in the course of combating the disgruntled townsfolk. Due to his own incompetence, he accidentally conjures up two benevolent demons who become central characters throughout the rest of the series.

The second arc concerns a rancher and the grisly fate of his chickens.

The third, and longest, arc tells of a world-famous violinist who visits the town, bringing with him a hideous secret.

== Publication history ==
The complete series was 271 pages long in its initial form of publication. The first two arcs were later edited together and published in paperback by Catalan Communications (1987) with an introduction by Heavy Metal editor Julie Simmons-Lynch.

Tex Arcana returned to Heavy Metal in the tenth anniversary issue (July 1987). This was a self-contained ten page story titled "The Ballad of the Witch's Daughter".

In 2006, the entire series was edited by the author into a single volume titled Tex Arcana: a Saga of the Old West published by BookSurge. The series was viewable online, along with a continuation of the story, at the author's website, however, as of early 2017, the links to the artistic content are not active, other than the link to the self-contained ten-page story titled "The Ballad Of The Witch's Daughter".

== See also ==
- Weird West
