= Pinky (comics) =

Italian cartoon character

- Pinky character
- Pinky, the main protagonist of the series
- First appearance: October 1973
- Last appearance: 2014
- Created by: Massimo Mattioli
- Genre: Humor, Comedy

In-universe information
- Species: Bunny
- Gender: Male
- Occupation: Photojournalist
- Significant other: Petulia
- Nationality: Italian

Pinky is an Italian cartoon character created by Massimo Mattioli in 1973. He is the title character of an Italian humorous comic series of the same name created by Massimo Mattioli. The comics debuted in the children magazine Il Giornalino in October 1973 and through the years Pinky became the most loved character and the mascot of the magazine. The series features a small eccentric pink bunny named Pinky, who works as a photojournalist for a newspaper ("La notizia") run by a vain, tyrannical and selfish elephant named Perry. His mission is to photograph any strange event or bizarre citizen.

== Publication history ==
In 2024, Rainbow announced its acquisition of the rights to Pinky. Two years later, a complete chronological edition was announced by Nona Arte: its first volume, Pinky 1973-1974, is scheduled for November 2026, with a preview at Lucca Comics & Games.

== Characters ==
- Pinky, the protagonist of the eponymous series of stories. He is a pink rabbit constantly on the hunt for news: he works as a photojournalist for the newspaper La notizia . He is madly in love with Petulia, a pink bunny, a secretary at his newspaper. His boss is called Perry Pachiderma, his best friend and colleague (despite their frequent challenges and squabbles) is Giorgione, an overweight bear. His worst enemy is Joe Cornacchia, an unscrupulous journalist who works for the competing newspaper (Il Giornalaccio) and who constantly tries to steal his scoops.
- Petulia, Pinky's Crush.
- Crocodylus, the mad crocodile scientist who always causes panic with his crazy inventions.
- Scarrafone, a friendly cockroach who loves garbage cans, where he happily eats the most disgusting things.

== Serial stories ==
In addition to the series of stories with variable subjects, other series with fixed subjects have developed over time. Among the most famous are the one-page ones entitled UFO, Fantasy and Microfilms . There are the numerous Chronicles, of which the most frequent are those entitled Cronaca nera . A very famous double cycle, of 20 stories each, is that of Senza orecchie and Senza naso . Then there is the Blues cycle, 23 noir-flavored stories where Pinky, the narrator, recounts his unusual thriller adventures tackling and solving cases, such as those of the dead marker, the werewolf carrots, and the traffic light in love. Another famous cycle is that of Universi paralleli, each with a number indicating how many layers it is distant from Pinky's, who is transported to us each time with a loud sneeze. There is also a short cycle of 5 stories entitled Viaggi nel tempo and one featuring Giorgione as the protagonist Man-sink . Finally, it is worth noting the long serialized story, composed of 9 chapters, entitled La mosca, where Pinky has to deal with an atomic fly and must prevent it from exploding.

== Awards ==
- 1975 – Thanks to Pinky, its author is awarded the Yellow Kid at the International Comics and Animation Fair in Lucca .
- 2010 – Attilio Micheluzzi Award
  - Best Humorous Comic Series.
- 2012 – Attilio Micheluzzi Award
  - Best series with unrealistic drawing.

== Books ==
- Massimo Mattioli, Pinky, "I Fortissimi" series, Epipress, 1979.
- Massimo Mattioli (2006). Pinky. Il clik più veloce del mondo. Mondadori. ISBN 8804557605. OCLC 799335022.
- Massimo Mattioli, "I maestri del fumetto contemporaneo. Massimo Mattioli" , supplement to Il Giornalino No. 40, Periodici San Paolo, Milan, October 2, 2005.
- Massimo Mattioli (2009). Pinky. Maestri del fumetto. Vol. 35. Mondadori. OCLC 799620697.
- Massimo Mattioli, Extra Pinky, supplement to Il Giornalino n. 2, Periodici San Paolo, Milan, 9 January 2011.
