= Mars (Zorn book) =

1977 essay by Fritz Angst (as Fritz Zorn)

- Author: Fritz Zorn
- Publication date: 1977
- ISBN: 3596222028

Mars is an autobiographical book by Fritz Angst (1944–1976) under the pseudonym Fritz Zorn. It was first published in 1977. Adolf Muschg wrote its long and engaged foreword. The book was reviewed in the book review section of The New York Times, which says that the author's pseudonym of "Fritz Zorn" literally means "Freddie Anger". In the book, written after the author was diagnosed with cancer, Zorn describes and criticizes his environment, entourage, and upbringing in one of the wealthiest lakeshore neighborhoods of Zurich, Switzerland, where he says he was "educated to death". Zorn laments his "unlived life": though he apparently became successful in the eyes of the bourgeoisie (he attended university and became a teacher), his whole life was "wrong". He suffered from depression and never had friends or a girlfriend.

The book saw significant success in Europe in the late 1970s and early 1980s, but was not well received in the late 1980s nor in English translation. The New York Times reviewed it harshly, saying the author's experience with cancer did "not confer acuity or wisdom – only pain, suffering and despair". The review wonders why the book was published at all, referring to it as "whining" and saying it "continues for 143 pages of almost sadistic tedium".

The author believed that cancer was psychosomatic, caused by mental pain and repressed emotions, a theme which became popular in several self-help books of the time.

The book has been translated into several languages. Alex and Daniel Varenne developed a comic book based on the book in 1988, and Darius Peyamiras wrote and directed a play drawn from it in 2001.
