= Jacques de Loustal =

French comics artist (born 1956)

Loustal
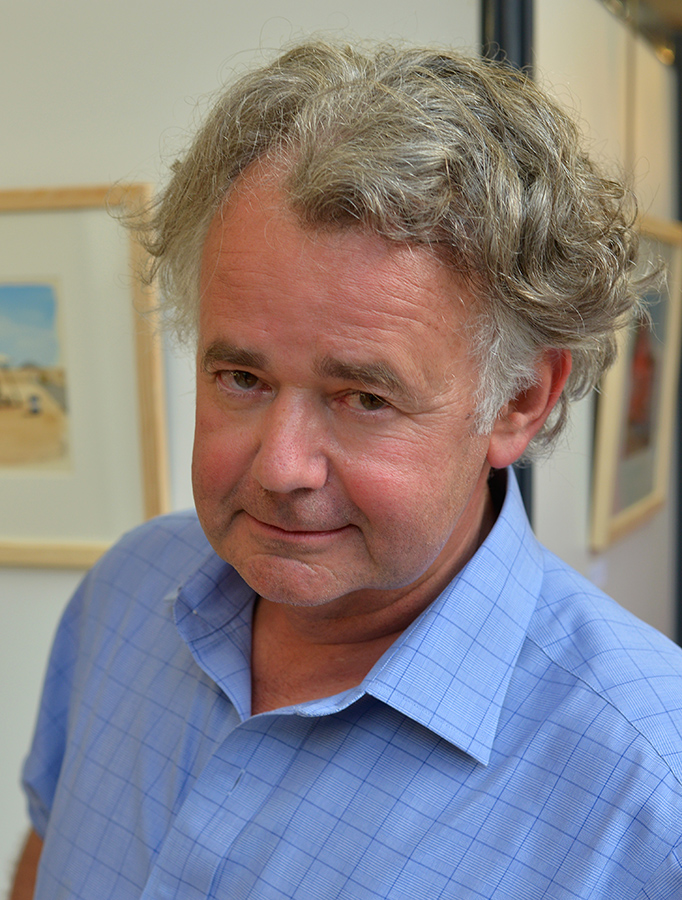
- Loustal in 2015.
- Born: Jacques de Loustal; 10 April 1956 (age 70) Neuilly-Sur-Seine, France
- Areas: Artist, writer, colourist
- Notable works: New York Miami; Clichés d'Amour; Barney and the Blue Note; The Boys of Sheriff Street ("Les Frères Adamov")

Jacques de Loustal (born 10 April 1956) is a French comics artist who uses a painterly style reminiscent of David Hockney.

== Biography ==
In combination with a career as an illustrator, Loustal began working in comics in the late 1970s publishing short comics in the Franco-Belgian comics magazines Métal Hurlant, Pilote, Nitro, Chic, Zoulou as well as newspapers such as Libération, usually working with writer Philippe Paringaux. In 1984 Loustal became a frequent contributor to the monthly À Suivre magazine, for which he created Coeurs de Sable, Barney et la Note Bleue, Un Jeune Homme Romantique and Kid Congo.

== Partial bibliography ==
Panels from New York Miami

- Arrière saison
- Viviane, Simone et les autres
- Zenata plage
- Carnet de voyages
- Ce qu'il attendait d'elle
- Ciné-Romans
- Touriste de bananes (after text by Georges Simenon)
- Insolite
- La Nuit de l'alligator
- Une vespa, des lunettes noires, une palm beach, elles voudraient en plus que j'ai de la conversation.
- Barney et la note bleue with Philippe Paringaux
- Cœurs de sable with Philippe Paringaux
- New-York Miami with Philippe Paringaux
- Le Sang des voyous with Philippe Paringaux
- Kid Congo with Philippe Paringaux
- Clichés d'amour with Philippe Paringaux
- La Couleur des rêves with Philippe Paringaux
- Soleils de nuit with Philippe Paringaux
- Un garçon romantique with Philippe Paringaux

=== English books ===
- The Boys of Sheriff Street with Philippe Paringaux - 2016
- What he expected of her - 2002
- Java in the Shadow of Merapi with Jean-Luc Coatalem - 1996
- New York, Miami with Philippe Paringaux - 1990
- Barney and the Blue Note with Philippe Paringaux - 1988
- Love Shots with Philippe Paringaux - 1988
- Hearts of Sand with Philippe Paringaux - 1985
