= Roger Leloup =

Belgian comics artist (born 1933)

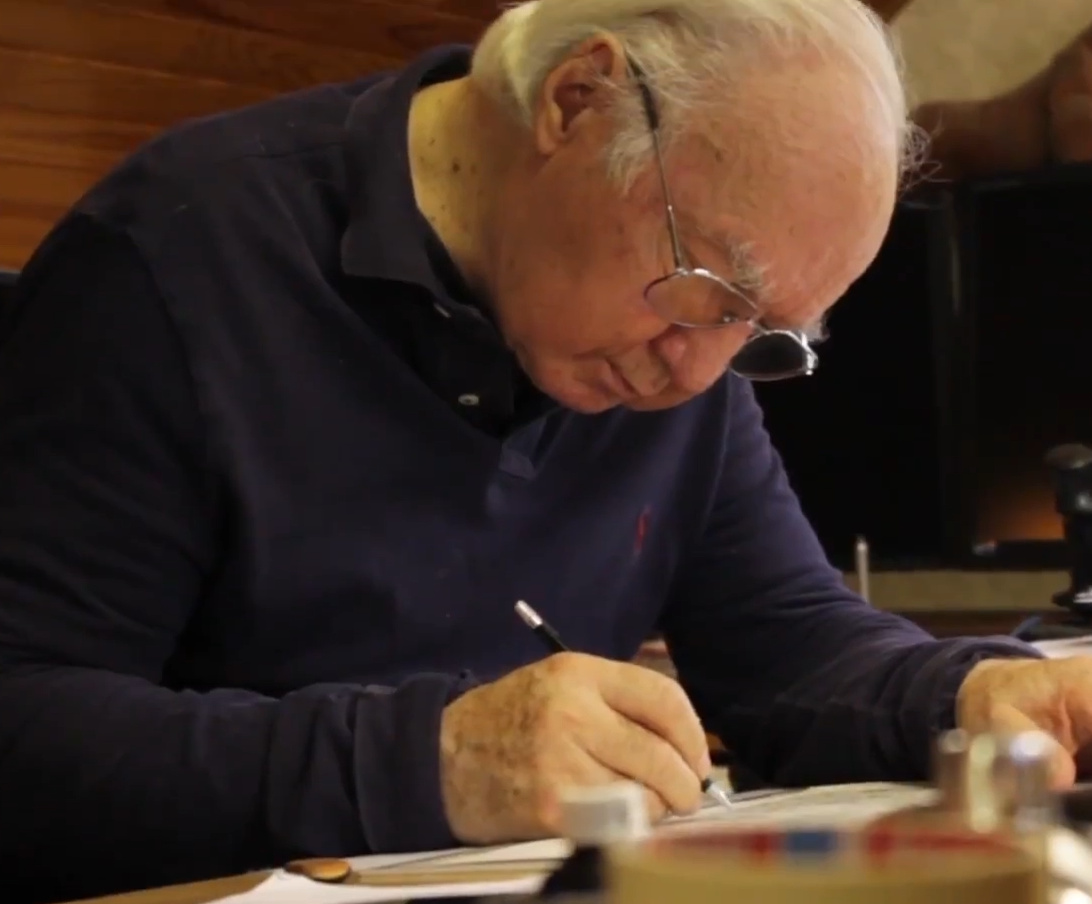
- Born: 17 November 1933 (age 93) Verviers, Belgium
- Areas: Artist, writer
- Notable works: Yoko Tsuno
- Awards: full list

Roger Leloup (French: [ʁɔʒe ləlu]; born 17 November 1933) is a Belgian comic strip artist, novelist, and a former collaborator of Hergé, who would rely upon him to create detailed, realistic drawings and elaborate decoration for The Adventures of Tintin. He is most famous for the Yoko Tsuno comic series.

== Biography ==
Roger Leloup was born in Verviers, Belgium in 1933. Fascinated by trains and planes since his youth, he studied Decoration and Publicity at the Institut Saint-Luc in Liège. By accident, he came into contact with the Franco-Belgian comics scene when his neighbour, Jacques Martin, told him that he desperately needed a colourist. Leloup got the job and started colouring the Alix album L'ïle maudite in 1950.

Jacques Martin was one of the main artists of the Franco-Belgian comics magazine Tintin, and when Hergé was looking for someone to help him with the drawings of vehicles for a series, Martin brought him in contact with Leloup. From 15 February 1953 on, Leloup worked for several years at Studios Hergé, where he drew detailed backgrounds and vehicles for Hergé's comics series The Adventures of Tintin. His work is seen in a wide variety of drawings, such as the Genève-Cointrin airport in The Calculus Affair and the impressive swing-wing supersonic business jet, the Carreidas 160 in Flight 714 to Sydney.

Leloup worked for both Jacques Martin, with Alix and Lefranc, and for Hergé, but as the production at the Studios Hergé slowed down, Leloup came into contact with other artists. He worked for a period with Francis, and also collaborated with Peyo on his less well-known series Jacky and Célestin. Here, he created a Japanese female character that would later become the inspiration for his own series.

On 31 December 1969, Leloup left Studios Hergé to work full-time on his own series, Yoko Tsuno, with a focus on technology and science fiction. The character Yoko Tsuno, a Japanese woman living in Brussels, is one of the leading examples of the female-fronted comics that appeared in European juvenile magazines during this period. All Yoko Tsuno stories first appeared in Spirou magazine and later as an album series published by editions Dupuis.

He has an adopted Korean daughter, who inspired him to draw the character Morning Dew, the little Chinese girl from Le Dragon de Hong Kong, who was adopted by Yoko Tsuno.

== Bibliography ==
- Yoko Tsuno, 1970–, 31 albums, Dupuis, ISSN 0772-0866

Roger Leloup has also written two novels, including one featuring Yoko Tsuno:

- — (1989). Le pic des ténèbres. Travelling. Duculot. ISBN 2-8011-0812-X.
- — (1991). L'Écume de l'aube. Travelling. Duculot. ISBN 2-8011-0990-8.

== Awards ==
- 1972, European SF special award for Belgian comics for Yoko Tsuno at the first Eurocon in Trieste, Italy
- 1974: Prix Saint-Michel, Brussels, Belgium, for Best Comic
- 1990: Grand Prix de la Science Fiction Française, category "Youth", for his novel Le pic des ténèbres, France
