= Marc Michetz =

Belgian comic book artist (1951–2025)

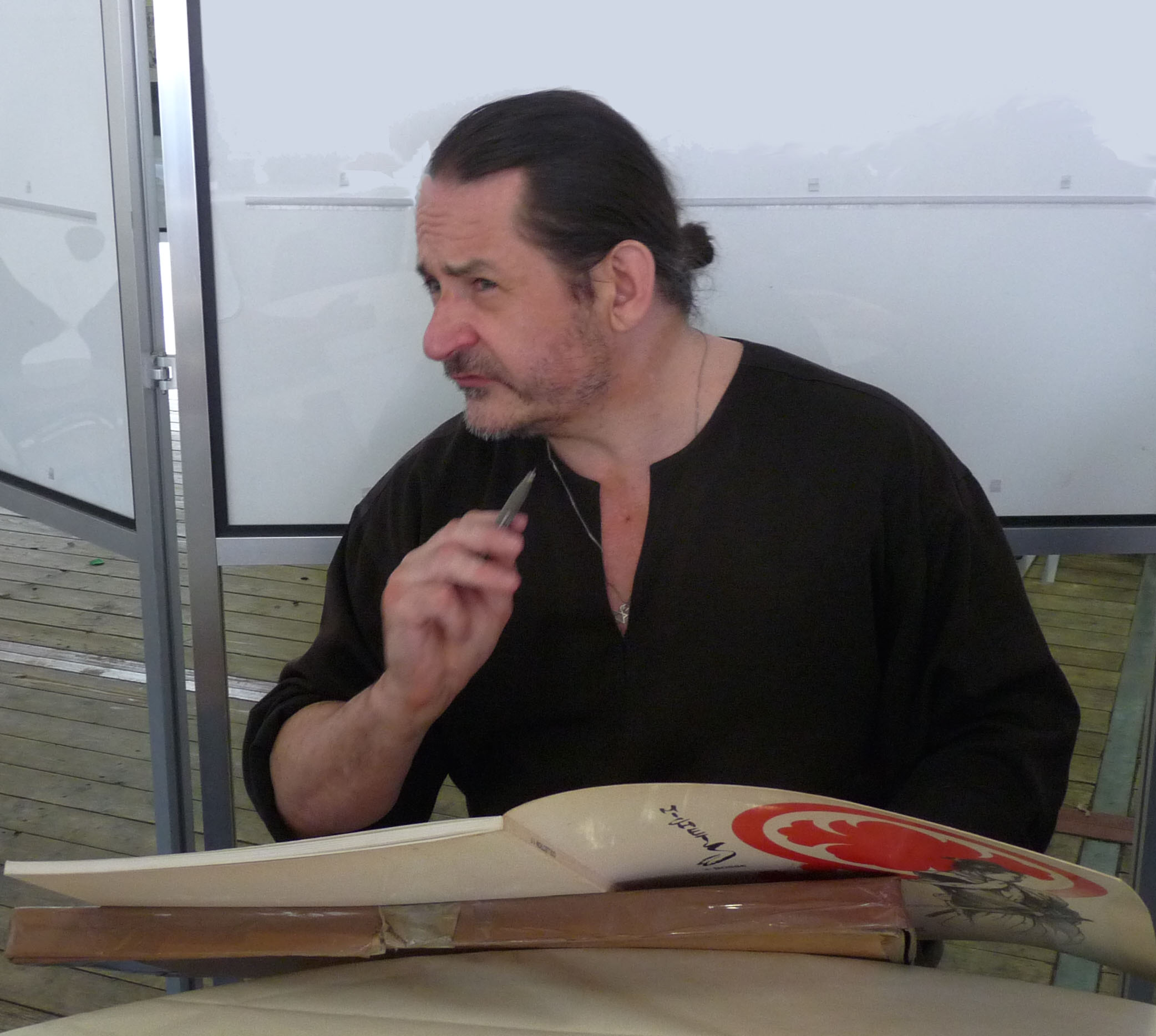
- Michetz in 2009
- Born: 15 October 1951; Ixelles, Belgium
- Died: 9 January 2025 (aged 73); Brussels, Belgium
- Occupation: Comics artist

Marc Michetz, pseudonym of Marc Degroide (15 October 1951 – 9 January 2025) was a Belgian comics artist.

== Life and career ==
Marc Degroide was born on 15 October 1951, in Ixelles, a commune in Brussels. He lived for eighteen years in Katanga and returned to Belgium to work in different professions. He followed artistic training at the Royal Academy of Fine Arts in Brussels. He was fond of Japanese martial arts, and practiced judo, kendo, then iaido.

Michetz was one of the original members of Le Gang Mazda (Mazda Gang), a fictionalized comic book series about a trio of cartoonists, together with Christian Darasse and Bernard Hislaire. He started his career at Studio Graton and then drew for magazines Tintin and Spirou. Michetz was passionate about the Japanese Middle Ages. His best-known creation is the Kogaratsu series, about a rōnin, which he created together with Serge Bosmans (Bosse) in 1983. Michetz held multiple Japanese-themed expositions.

Michetz died on 9 January 2025, at the age of 73.
