= Palau-del-Vidre =

- Commune
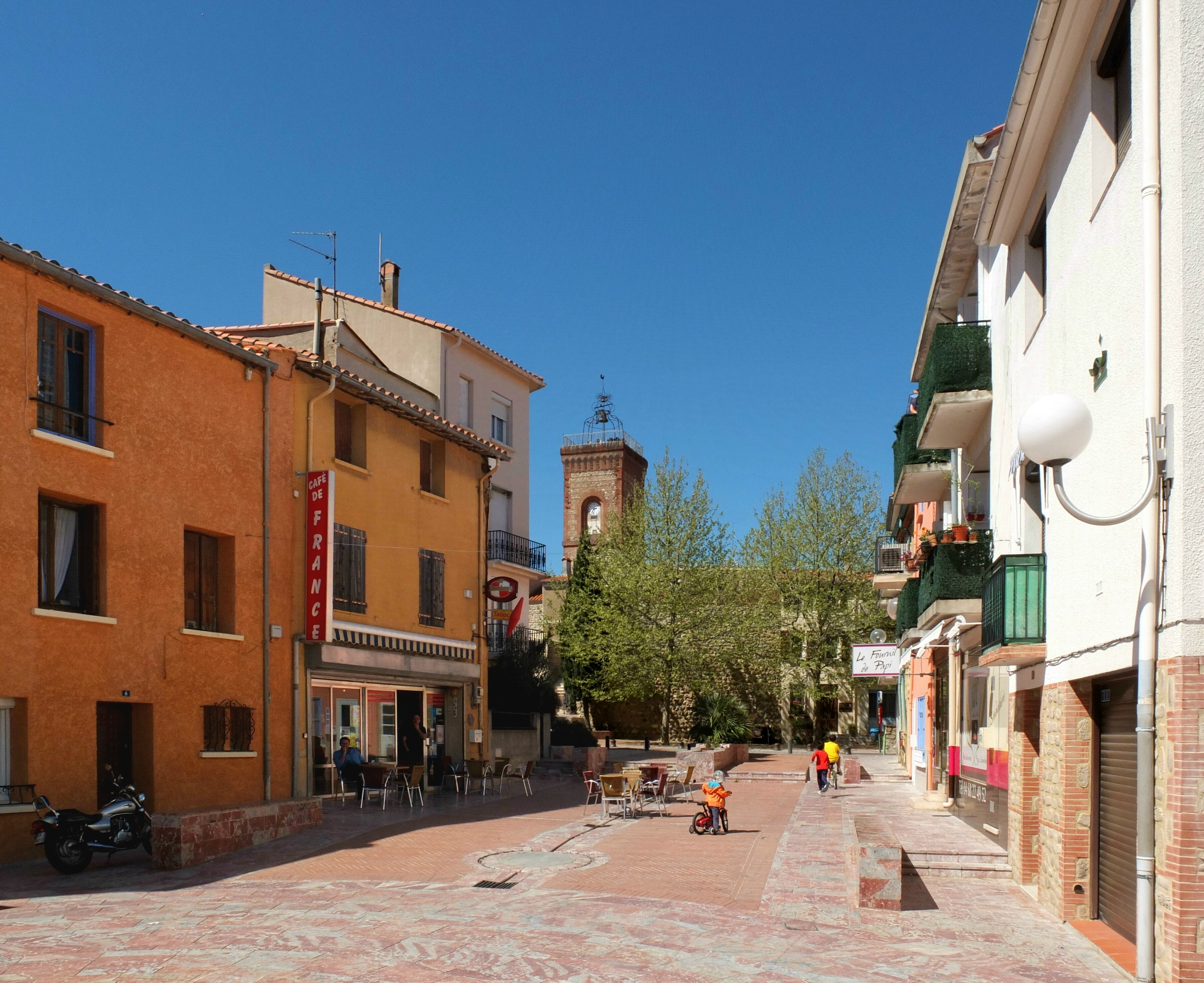
- Town centre of Palau-del-Vidre

- Coat of arms
- Location of Palau-del-Vidre
- Location within France Location within Occitanie
- Coordinates: 42°34′26″N 2°57′43″E
- Country: France
- Region: Occitania
- Department: Pyrénées-Orientales
- Arrondissement: Céret
- Canton: La Côte Vermeille
- Intercommunality: CC des Albères, de la Côte Vermeille et de l'Illibéris

Government
  - Mayor (2020–2026): Bruno Galan
- Area^{1}: 10.41 km^{2} (4.02 sq mi)
- Elevation: 19 m (62 ft)
- Highest elevation: 46 m (151 ft)
- Lowest elevation: 9 m (30 ft)
- Population (2023): 3,329
  - Density: 319.8/km^{2} (828.2/sq mi)
- Time zone: UTC+01:00 (CET)
  - Summer (DST): UTC+02:00 (CEST)
- INSEE/Postal code: 66133 /66690
- ^{1} French Land Register data, which excludes lakes, ponds, glaciers > 1 km^{2} (0.386 sq mi or 247 acres) and river estuaries.

Palau-del-Vidre (French pronunciation: [palo dɛl vidʁ]; Catalan: Palau del Vidre) is a commune in the Pyrénées-Orientales department in southern France.

== Geography ==
Palau-del-Vidre is located in the canton of La Côte Vermeille and in the arrondissement of Céret.

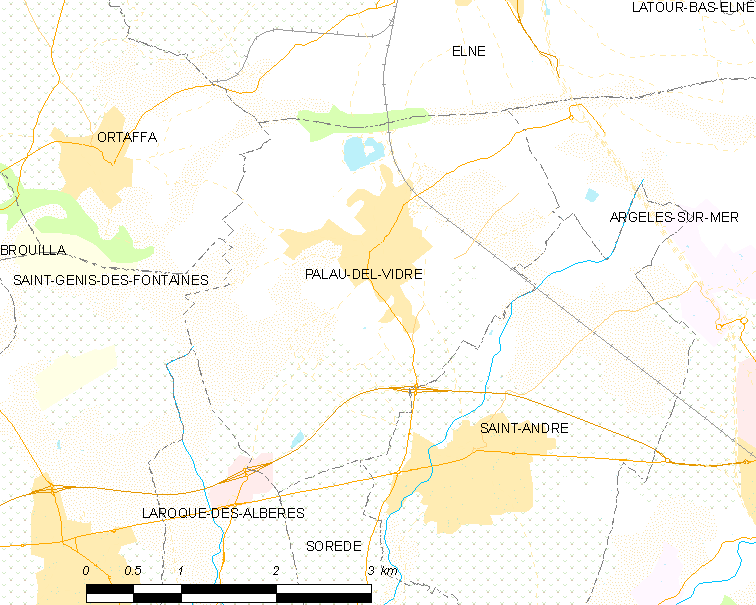
Map of Palau-del-Vidre and its surrounding communes

== Population ==
Historical population
Year	Pop.	±% p.a.
1968	1,330	—
1975	1,417	+0.91%
1982	1,738	+2.96%
1990	2,004	+1.80%
1999	2,117	+0.61%
2007	2,607	+2.64%
2012	3,052	+3.20%
2017	3,142	+0.58%
2023	3,329	+0.97%
Source: INSEE

== See also ==
- Communes of the Pyrénées-Orientales department
