= Torpedo (comics) =

Comic series by Enrique Sánchez Abulí

Panel detail from Torpedo 1936

Torpedo, or Torpedo 1936, is a Spanish comics series written by Enrique Sánchez Abulí and drawn mostly by Jordi Bernet, which depicts the adventures of antihero Luca Torelli, a heartless hitman, and his sidekick Rascal, in context of the violent organized crime culture of New York City during the Great Depression era.

== Publication history ==
The series was originally developed by Abulí and veteran American artist Alex Toth, who drew the first two stories in 1981. The collaboration ended when Toth decided he did not share Abulí's darkly humorous view of mankind and frequent use of profanity, and withdrew from the project. He was then replaced by Jordi Bernet, whose gritty, if stylized, artistic style was well suited for the dark and violent subject matter.

Torpedo 1936 was first published in issue #32 of the Spanish horror comics magazine Creepy in February 1982. The first two issues featured Toth's artwork, and starting in issue #34, with the story De perro a perro, Bernet was responsible for the drawings. Torpedo went on to be featured in several Spanish comics magazines, such as Thriller, Comix International, Totem el comix, Co & Co and Viñetas, and albums were published, translated into several languages. The public response to the series became substantial, and it was awarded with the 1986 Angoulême Best Foreign Album Award. Eventually, a dedicated magazine named Luca Torelli es Torpedo started publication in May 1991.

A new volume in the series was published in 2017 under the title Torpedo 1972, drawn by Eduardo Risso and featuring a now aging main character. It was released in English by Ablaze Publishing in 2024.

== Character history ==
Luca Torelli is born in Sicily circa 1903, to a poor, broken home marked by spousal abuse. His parents are presumed to be Vittorio Torelli and Luciana Petrosino. However, his older brother's real father was actually their grandfather (who raped his own daughter) and it is implied that Luca's own biological father was the local mafioso kingpin, who raped Luciana in exchange for mediating peacefully in the feud between the Torellis and the Petrosinos. Luca loses his older brother to a severe beating by their drunken father, orchestrates a vengeance against the latter by using a vindictive neighbour as an unwitting agent, and finally witnesses their mother dying of sorrow upon her son's and husband's consecutive deaths, thereupon being fostered by his uncle Vincenzo. Despite the fact that he engineered his father's death at the hands of their neighbour, the ancestral institution of vendetta prevails and Luca kills him with his uncle's aid; this is implied to be his first direct murder. He is then forced to flee for America as a teenager where he works as a shoe shiner, thereby meeting an abusive senior police officer named MacDonald whom he finally shoots, being involved in other law infringements, such as bank robberies, which also happen to end in murders, and soon becoming a hit man ("torpedo" is 1920s slang for a contract killer). Some time later, he gets a Polish American sidekick called Rascal.

From here onwards it is difficult to maintain a linear narrative since no dates are given (aside from incidental details such as the Volstead Act, the outburst of the Spanish Civil War and, later in the series, the Cuban revolution). Apart from Rascal and characters in flashback stories, there are few recurring characters and few dates are given for his present day stories. The only significant recurring character is a woman called Susan who consistently outwits Torelli. She appears in the first story by Bernet (De perro a perro), a second one still early on (La dama de los camelos), and one of the latest (El día de la mala baba). At least thirteen years are said to have passed between her second and third appearance; she is assumed to be a high-profile prostitute in the first two (whose services had been solicited by Torelli himself in the past), and a "reformed", recently widowed housewife and mother, who had presumably "screwed her [old and rich] husband to death", as Torelli puts it, in the third.

== Bibliography (Spain) ==
Luca Torelli es Torpedo issue #1 (1991)

All published by Glénat:

- Torpedo T1
- Torpedo T2: Qué tiempos aquellos
- Torpedo T3
- Torpedo T4: El arte de rematar
- Torpedo T5: Sing-Sing Blues
- Torpedo T6
- Torpedo T7
- Torpedo T8: La ley del Talón (1994)
- Torpedo T9: Toccata y fuga
- Torpedo T10: No es oro todo lo que seduce (1993)
- Torpedo T11: El partido
- Torpedo T12
- Torpedo T13: Cuba
- Torpedo T14: ¡Adiós muñeco!
- Torpedo T15: El día de la mala baba

Integral collections

- Torpedo Obra Completa Vol. 1. (2004, ISBN 978-84-8449-645-8) Containing:
  - Luca Torelli es... Torpedo (Torpedo 1936 Cap.1, Torpedo 1936 Cap.2, De perro a perro, Érase un chivato, Conmigo no se juega)
  - Qué tiempos aquellos (Qué tiempos aquellos, Dumbo, Un solo de trompeta, R.I.P. y amén, El cambiazo)
  - Flash-Back (Flash-Back, El tipo que no se chupaba el dedo, La noche de San Valentón, El negro que puso los ojos en blanco, Año nuevo muerte nueva)
- Torpedo Obra Completa Vol. 2 (2004, ISBN 978-84-8449-646-5) Containing:
  - El arte de rematar (El arte de rematar, Tócala otra vez, Sam; Tic-Tac, La dama de los camelos, Rascal)
  - Sing-sing Blues (Sing-sing blues, Más ruda será la caída, Miami bitch, West sad story, Dos hombres y un destino)
  - Un salario de miedo
- Torpedo Obra Completa Vol. 3 (2004, ISBN 978-84-8449-647-2) Containing:
  - Érase una vez en Italia (Érase una vez en Italia, Llamad a cualquier puta, La hiena ríe de 4 a 6, En nombre de la Lou, Ceniciento)
  - La ley del talón
  - Toccata y fuga (Levántate y anda, Toccata y fuga, Un día en las carreras, Tres hombres y un biberón, Tirando hacia atrás con ira)
- Torpedo Obra Completa Vol. 4 (2004, ISBN 978-84-8449-648-9) Containing:
  - No es oro todo lo que seduce (La otra cara de la monada, Las 7 vidas del gato, La paloma de la paz, No es oro todo lo que seduce, Iré a escupir sobre vuestra timba)
  - El partido (El partido, Sodoma y camorra, Lolita, Más dura será la recaída, Un alto en el camino, Coyote)
  - El sórdido (El sórdido, La madrina, El atracón, Adivina quién palma esta noche, ¿Quién teme al lobo feroz?, Una, dos y tres)
- Torpedo Obra Completa Vol. 5 (2004, ISBN 978-84-8449-649-6)
  - Adiós muñeco, Bendita vendetta, El año que bebimos peligrosamente, La Tapadera, Pietro
- Los relatos de Torpedo

== Sources ==
- Index of Torpedo publications in Creepy Tebeosfera (in Spanish)
- Torpedo albums Ediciones Glénat (in Spanish)
- Torpedo albums Bedetheque (in French)
