= Giuseppe Bergman =

Italian comics series by Milo Manara

Giuseppe Bergman is an Italian comics series by Milo Manara, which was first published in 1978. It stars a Candide-like anti-hero who appeared in four graphic novels which are an ironic deconstruction of adventure stories and comic books as a medium.

== History ==
The first adventure, later collected for publication as HP et Giuseppe Bergman (The Great Adventure in Catalan's English translation), was originally serialized in the Franco-Belgian comics magazine À Suivre beginning in 1978. Giuseppe Bergman appears as a dissatisfied 20-something longing for adventure. Seeking it, he responds to the advertisement of a mysterious company which sends him to HP, "the adventure master”: a caricature of and homage to famed Italian cartoonist Hugo Pratt. Bergman finds himself confronted by hoodlums, rioters, white slavers, drug addicts, revolutionaries, and natives, but his adventures are bumbling disasters as he is consistently unprepared for the situations he encounters. In later adventures, collected in the graphic novels An Author in Search of Six Characters, Dies Irae, Perchance to Dream, and To See the Stars, Bergman's frustrating adventures take him through Africa, India, and the world of European art. Themes of art and illusion, fantasy and frustration, responsibility and human nature run through the stories. Bergman's Odyssey published by Manara in Italian in 2004, was translated into English, and included in The Manara Library Volume 5 Further Adventures of Giuseppe Bergman in 2013.
