= Massimo Mattioli =

Italian artist and cartoonist (1943–2019)

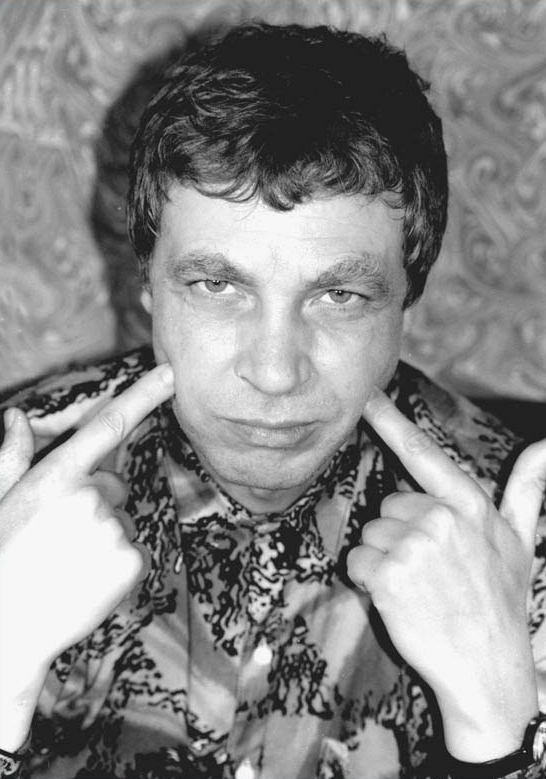
- Mattioli in 1995
- Born: 25 September 1943 Rome, Italy
- Died: 23 August 2019 (aged 75) Rome, Italy
- Area: Cartoonist
- Notable works: Squeak the Mouse

Massimo Mattioli (25 September 1943 – 23 August 2019) was an Italian artist and cartoonist. He was known for his humorous children's work and adult comic book series.

== Biography ==
Mattioli was born in 1943.

Mattioli debuted in 1965 in the weekly comics magazine Il Vittorioso with Vermetto Sigh. He was also published in Corto Maltese and Frigidaire. In fact, he was one of the founders of Frigidaire.

Growing up into an interest in cartoons, he admired Tex Avery, George Herriman, Johnny Hart and Carl Barks.

Later he moved to London, where he made comics for the Mayfair magazine. Between 1968 and 1973, he produced M le magicien for the French children's weekly Pif, later collected in 2003 by L'Association in a single volume .In the early 1970s, he created Pasquino for the Paese Sera newspaper. In 1973 he began his collaboration in the Il Giornalino, creating the character Pinky. In 1977, in association with Stefano Tamburini, he created the underground magazine Cannibale. In 1979, the satirical magazine Il Male published the first adventure of Joe Galaxy, that will be later published in Cannibale, Frigidaire and Comic Art. In 1982, he created the Squeak the Mouse series, a parody of Tom and Jerry. Mattioli collaborated with Italo disco duo Righeira and created the cover artwork for their debut single, "Tanzen mit Righeira", released in 1983. Mattioli was recognized with many prizes, including the French prize Phenix in 1971, the Yellow Kid in 1975 and Romics d'Oro in 2009.

In 2022 Fantagraphics has published a collected edition of the series Squeak the Mouse.
