= Saint-Germain-au-Mont-d'Or =

- Commune
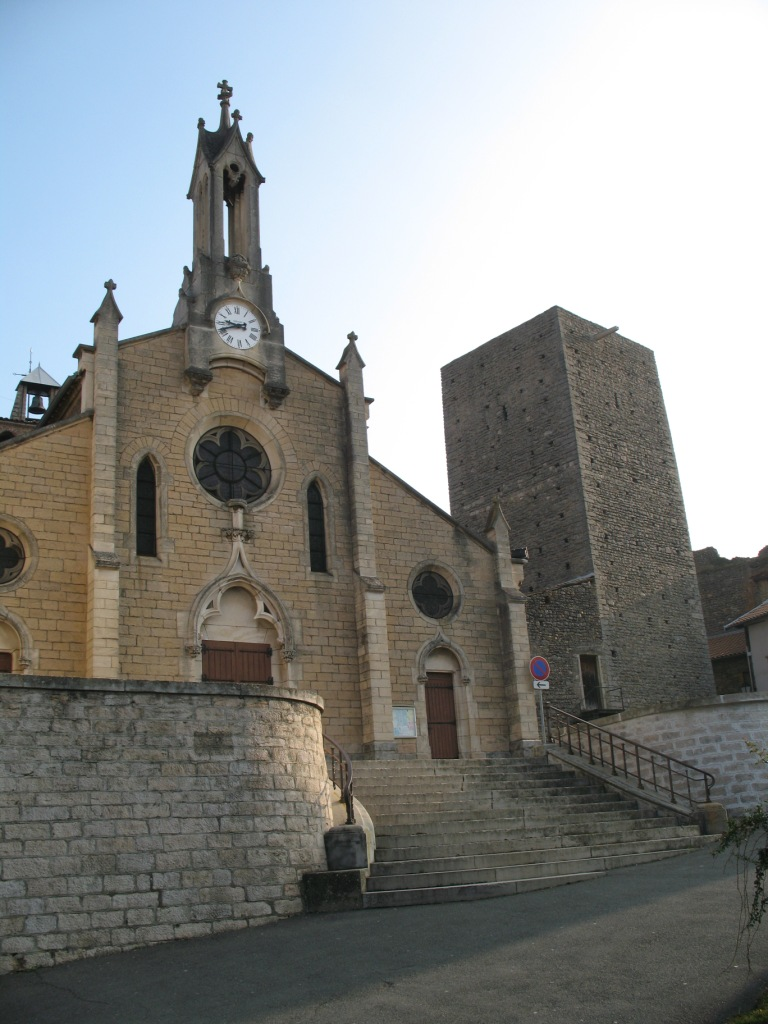
- The church in Saint-Germain-au-Mont-d'Or

- Coat of arms
- Location of Saint-Germain-au-Mont-d'Or
- Location within France Location within Auvergne-Rhône-Alpes
- Coordinates: 45°52′55″N 4°48′07″E
- Country: France
- Region: Auvergne-Rhône-Alpes
- Metropolis: Lyon Metropolis
- Arrondissement: Lyon

Government
  - Mayor (2020–2026): Beatrice Delorme
- Area^{1}: 5.43 km^{2} (2.10 sq mi)
- Elevation: 232 m (761 ft)
- Highest elevation: 440 m (1,440 ft)
- Lowest elevation: 167 m (548 ft)
- Population (2023): 3,124
  - Density: 575/km^{2} (1,490/sq mi)
- Time zone: UTC+01:00 (CET)
  - Summer (DST): UTC+02:00 (CEST)
- INSEE/Postal code: 69207 /69650
- ^{1} French Land Register data, which excludes lakes, ponds, glaciers > 1 km^{2} (0.386 sq mi or 247 acres) and river estuaries.

Saint-Germain-au-Mont-d'Or (French pronunciation: [sɛ̃ ʒɛʁmɛ̃ o mɔ̃ dɔʁ]) is a commune in the Metropolis of Lyon in the Auvergne-Rhône-Alpes region in central-eastern France.

== Geography ==
It lies 12 km (7.4 mi) north of Lyon on the right bank of the Saône river.

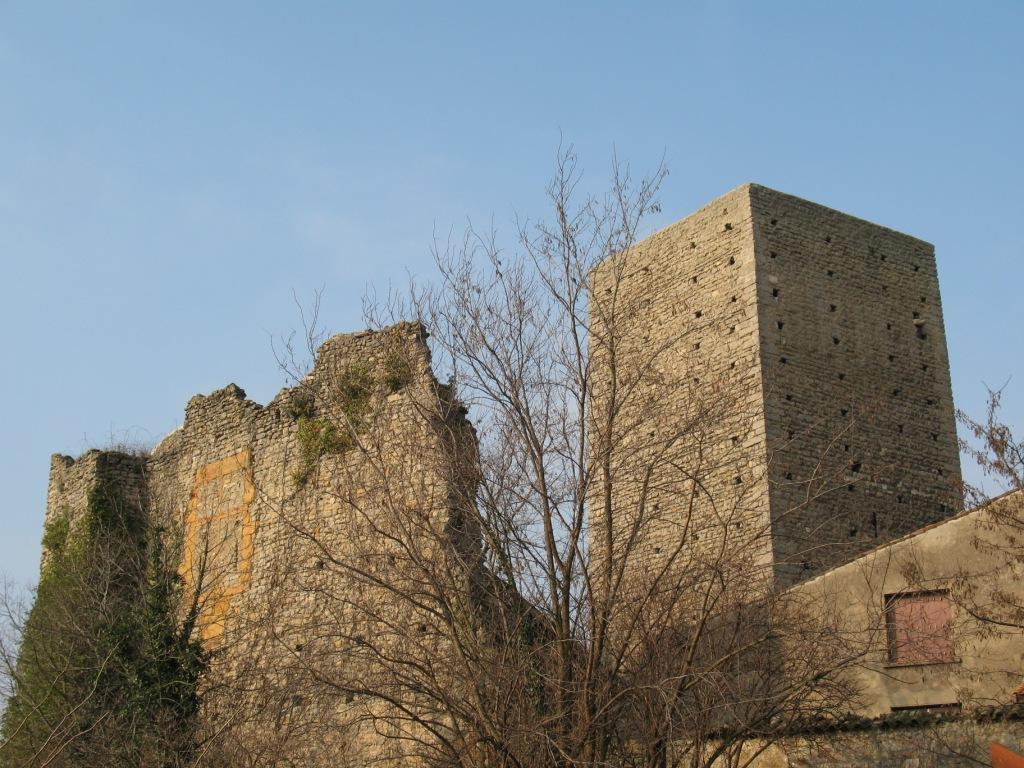
The medieval castle

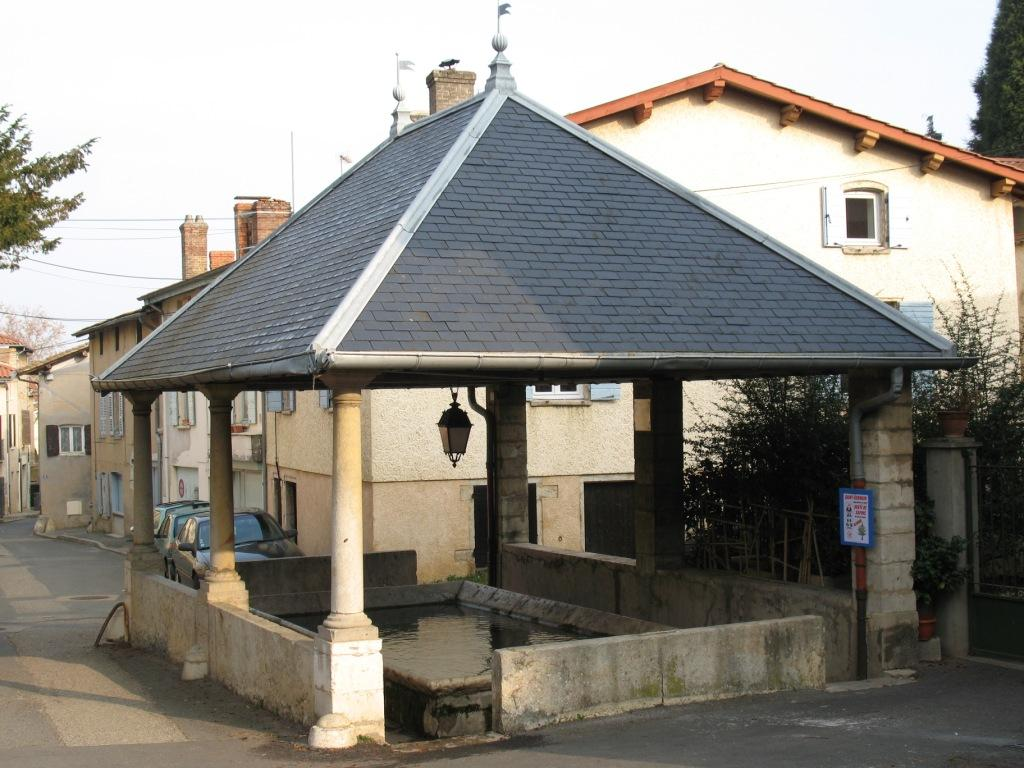
The lavoir

== Population ==
Historical population
Year	Pop.	±% p.a.
1968	1,971	—
1975	2,170	+1.38%
1982	2,129	−0.27%
1990	2,429	+1.66%
1999	2,385	−0.20%
2007	2,555	+0.86%
2012	2,843	+2.16%
2017	3,085	+1.65%
2023	3,124	+0.21%
Source: INSEE

== Sights ==
- The medieval castle.
