= Seccotine =

Recurring character from the Spirou et Fantasio comics

Seccotine as drawn by André Franquin in 1956

Seccotine is a recurring character from the Spirou et Fantasio comics, and the first major female character of the series, a strong-willed reporter. She was created by André Franquin, and made her first appearance in La turbotraction serialised in 1953 and published in the album La corne de rhinocéros in 1955.

== Character ==
She is an energetic journalist with a knack for outwitting Fantasio as they compete to uncover interesting and/or sensational stories, much to his frustration. Because of this, there is always some antagonism between them, though Spirou is much more friendly with her. However, she has also been very helpful, such as during the events in Palombia in Le dictateur et le champignon, when she helped Spirou and Fantasio send a secret message to the Count of Champignac, and later assisted Spirou with co-piloting an English Electric Canberra bomber plane to prevent General Zantas (a.k.a. Zantafio) from starting a war.

She was the central character in Le nid des Marsupilamis, revolving around her documentary about the life of a Marsupilami family in the Palombian jungle. Even Fantasio was impressed by her story.

Seccotine disappeared from the series when Fournier took over (her only appearance in Fournier's period was a brief appearance in the Franquin tribute Joyeuses Pâques, Papa!). Fournier replaced her with Ororéa, another rival reporter but with whom Fantasio was madly in love, whereas he loathed Seccotine.

When Tome & Janry took over the Spirou series, they dropped Ororéa and brought Seccotine back in their second album, Aventure en Australie and later in Machine qui rêve.

== Spirou as love interest ==
There have been various hints towards a romantic link between Seccotine and Spirou. In "Machine qui rêve" she gets in touch with him to do a report she actually wanted Fantasio to do. When she speaks to him over the phone detailing the mission and he addresses her as "Seccotine" she tells him to drop that silly nickname and instead use her real name. Later in the album she and the Spirou clone are seen on board a ship with her asking him what his real name is.

In the stand-alone comic "Le tombeau des Champignac", by Yann and Fabrice Tarrin, Seccotine and Spirou are seen flirting and are even caught kissing by Fantasio. As the album ends and Seccotine and Spirou depart, they can be seen looking at each other with the look of two lovers departing.

Finally in "Aux sources du Z" as Spirou uses the time shifter to get back to the events of "La corne de rhinocéros", he encounters Seccotine wandering around their yard waiting to snap pictures of the brand new Turbot he and Fantasio had just received. Seccotine notes how different Spirou acts from the way she's gotten to know him, he's far more like a man, a fact that she deems not to be all that unpleasant. To silence her Spirou kisses her on the mouth which leaves her frozen in surprise. As he makes his way inside the house he admits to himself that he has wanted to kiss Seccotine for a long time and thanks Zorglub for providing the opportunity to do so.

== Appearances ==
In the main Spirou et Fantasio series, Seccotine appears in the following albums:

- 6. La corne de rhinocéros (Franquin)
- 7. Le dictateur et le champignon (Franquin)
- 11. Vacances sans histoires (in Le gorille a bonne mine) (Franquin)
- 12. Le nid des Marsupilamis (Franquin)
- HS4. Joyeuses Pâques, Papa! (Fantasio et le fantôme et 4 autres aventures) (Fournier)
- 34. Aventure en Australie (Tome & Janry)
- 38. La jeunesse de Spirou (Tome & Janry)
- 46. Machine qui rêve (Tome & Janry)
- 47. Paris-sous-Seine (Morvan & Munuera)
- 50. Aux sources du Z (Yann, Jean-David Morvan & José-Luis Munuera)
- 53. Dans les griffes de la Vipère (Fabien Vehlmann, Yoann Chivard)
- 56. La mort de Spirou (Sophie Guerrive, Benjamin Abitan, Olivier Schwartz)
- 57. La mémoire du futur (Sophie Guerrive, Benjamin Abitan, Olivier Schwartz)

In 2026, a spin-off series with Seccotine as the main character was released:

- 1. Mystère à Champignac (Sophie Guerrive, Elric )

Outside the main canon, Seccotine also appears in the following special editions:

- Le Triomphe de Zorglub (Olivier Bocquet, Brice Cossu, Alexis Sentenac)
- Le Tombeau des Champignac (Yann, Fabrice Tarrin)
- Fantasio se marie (Benoît Feroumont)
- Fondation Z (Denis-Pierre Filippi, Fabrice Lebeault)
- La baie de cochons (Michaël Baril, Clément Lemoine, Elric)

== Original meaning ==
"Seccotine" is an old brand of fish glue, sold in France in tubes. The character name chosen by Franquin comes from this well-known glue which had a very peculiar smell. This is a kind of "Madeleine de Proust" for all past schoolchildren. Franquin chose that name for his character because in the late 40s and early 50s, a 'Seccotine' was a usual nickname, or a friendly adjective designating somebody who behaves in a clingy way, like the character who pestily sticks to Spirou and Fantasio. As such, it is the equivalent of the expression " un(e) pot de colle" (French definition "pot de colle")

In Dutch Seccotine is called "IJzerlijm" which means "iron glue" again noting at how sticky she is.

In Finnish, (where the series is named Piko ja Fantasio) Seccotine is known as Kitariina (a wordplay based on Katariina "Catherine" and kita "jaws", hinting at Seccotine's loquacity). In the early seventies, an earlier translation published by Semic Press under the name Tipsu ja Tapsu, had her name varyingly as Sirpa Sirpakka and Sini Sirpakka.

In English translations by Cinebook, she is known as Cellophine.

In German translations she is called Steffani.

Her actual name was revealed in "Machine qui rêve" to be Sophie.

== See also ==
- List of characters in Spirou et Fantasio

== Sources ==
- Spirou et Fantasio Les Personnages: Seccotine spirou.com (in French)
- Spirou et Fantasio Personnages > Seccotine franquin.com (in French)

Footnotes
