= Le Petit Noël =

Belgian comic book series

Front cover of Noël et l’Elaoin (1978), showing Noël (right) and the Elaoin Sdrétu.(left)

Noël, or Le Petit Noël, is the main character of an eponymous Belgian comics series, and a secondary character of Spirou et Fantasio. His name means "Christmas" in French. The series Noël was created in 1957 by André Franquin and Jidéhem and published in the Franco-Belgian comics magazine Spirou, while Franquin created the following work alone or together with Will.

== Synopsis ==
Noël lives in the little village of Champignac. As Christmas Day approaches, he is more sad and unhappy than ever because he has no friends and his parents are poor and can't afford gifts for him. However, each year, Noël lives a good Christmas, either thanks to the Marsupilami or the Elaoin Sdrétu.

The atmosphere of the series was sometimes melancholic, as in some other of Franquin's work. The same atmosphere is also present in the Gaston Lagaffe series at the times of Christmas: the "miraculous" and idealized period of Christmas and New year is a recurring theme in Franquin's series.

Some of Noël's stories were more humorous: in one story he and the Marsupilami go to a sports stadium to watch a tennis match — only for the creature to ruin a wonderful game by catching the ball in mid-air.

== Characters ==
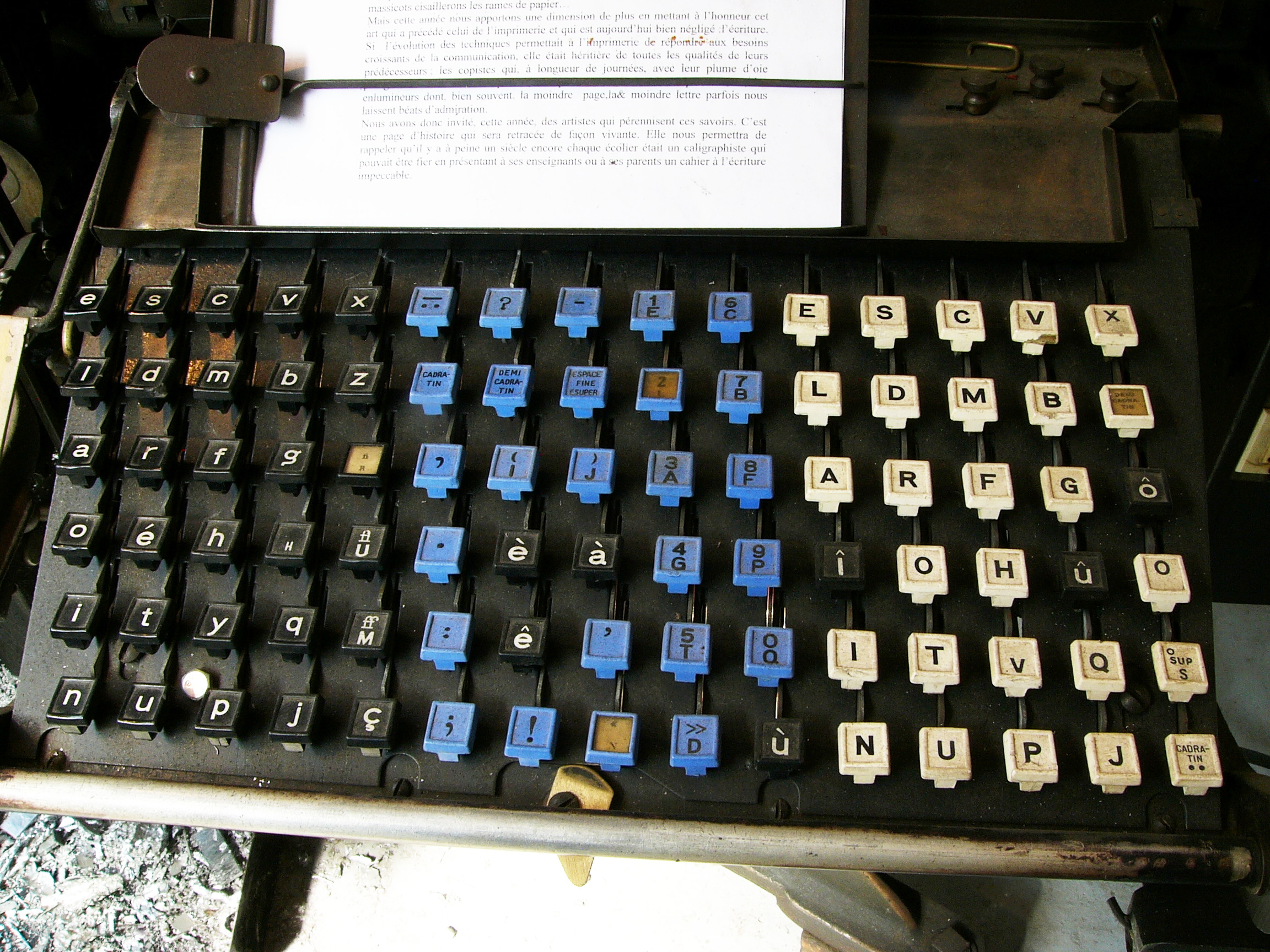
Elaoin Sdrétu, on the first two columns of a French linotype keyboard.

- Noël is a small, shy, introverted, quite unhappy and unlucky boy. His schoolmates make fun of him.
- The Elaoin Sdrétu is a sentient automaton, a resourceful machine able to guess and provide what a human needs to be happy. Its name comes from the French equivalent of Etaoin Shrdlu.
- Marsupilami is a friendly animal whose extremely long and agile tail provides many possibilities.

== Publications in Spirou ==
- 1957 N.1027 (2 strips) La bûche de Noël by Franquin
- 1958 N.1078 (2 strips) Les étranges amis de Noël by Franquin
- 1959 N.1131 (short story) Noël et l’Elaoin by Franquin
- 1964 N.1354 (4 strips) Joyeuses Pâques pour le Petit Noël by Franquin

== Albums ==
- Le prisonnier du bouddha and Panade à Champignac, two albums of the Spirou et Fantasio series drawn by Franquin, feature Noël.
- Noël et l'élaoin was published in black and white by the Yann Rudler editions in 1978. It was reedited in colours in 1982 by Bédérama editions.
- Crontch, crontch, was published by Durango editions in 1986.
- Capturez un Marsupilami, the seminal Marsupilami album contains a few stories with Noël, published 2002 by Marsu Productions editions.
- Les Noëls de Franquin, published by Marsu-Productions in 2006, groups all the stories drawn by Franquin and pre-published in Spirou in the 1950s and 1960s in relation with the Christmas period: covers, calendars, illustrations and some Noël strips.
- Retrouvailles, an album made under Franquin's supervision, with script by Serdu and artwork by Stibane, published in 1990 by Marsu Productions.

== Sources ==
- Noël publications in Le Journal de Spirou BDoubliées (in French)
- Noël et L'Elaoin Franquin.com (in French)
