= Le nid des Marsupilamis =

Spirou et Fantasio #12 Le nid des Marsupilamis
- Cover of the Belgian edition
- Date: 1960
- Series: Spirou et Fantasio
- Publisher: Dupuis

Creative team
- Writers: Franquin
- Artists: Franquin with Jidéhem

Original publication
- Published in: Le Journal de Spirou
- Issues: 1. 969 - #991 #1034 - #1045
- Date of publication: 1956 - 1957, 1958
- Language: French
- ISBN: 2-8001-0014-1

Chronology
- Preceded by: Le gorille a bonne mine, 1959
- Followed by: Le voyageur du Mésozoïque, 1960

Le nid des Marsupilamis, written and drawn by Franquin, is the twelfth album of the Spirou et Fantasio series. The title story, and another, La foire aux gangsters, were serialised in Spirou magazine before the release in a hardcover album in 1960.

== Story ==
In The Nest of the Marsupilamis, Seccotine invites Spirou and Fantasio to a screening of her new documentary film, revealing what she has been doing since last seen in Palombia (in Le dictateur et le champignon). The film follows a Marsupilami in the wild, as he discovers and courts a mate, and they form a family in need of care and protection.

In The Gangsters' Fair, Spirou and Fantasio are unexpectedly assaulted by a small martial arts-expert, Soto Kiki, who wants to train them in judo in order to act as bodyguards for the European visit of oil tycoon John P. Nut, a man with gangster enemies. All changes as the gangsters attempt to assassinate Soto Kiki, and kidnap the millionaire's infant son.

== Background ==
Since the stories of this album were produced some time apart, the protagonists abruptly shift from driving their Turbotraction:Turbot-Rhino I in the first story, and the Turbot 2 in the second.

Gaston Lagaffe features in his third Spirou adventure cameo in La foire aux gangsters. The version of this album differs slightly from the one serialised in Spirou, in that a final half-page has been removed.

In the original comic, issue 1045 published in late April 1958, Soto Kiki places a bomb in a rival gangster's car which explodes, killing his enemy. But Soto Kiki is nearby gloating and is subsequently arrested by the police who were also watching the property. Franquin concludes with a moral: "Gangster? Don't tell me about it. It's the worse job ever!"

The book version replaced this scene with a simple drawing of Gaston being released from prison, having been arrested with gangsters whom he assumed were friends of Spirou.

Franquin created Le nid des Marsupilamis - which features extensive parenting sequences - while his wife Liliane expected their first child.

In 1987, Marsu Productions launched a new series of the Marsupilami with La Queue du Marsupilami ("The Marsupilami's Tail"). Set in the Palombian jungle, this series features the further adventures of the Marsupilami, his mate and their family.
