= Les Chapeaux noirs =

Spirou et Fantasio #3 Les Chapeaux noirs
- Cover of the Belgian edition
- Date: 1952
- Series: Spirou et Fantasio
- Publisher: Dupuis

Creative team
- Writers: Franquin and Jijé
- Artists: Franquin and Jijé

Original publication
- Published in: Spirou magazine
- Issues: 1. 617 - #635 #575 - #588 #686 - #692 #636 - #652
- Date of publication: 1949 - 1950
- Language: French
- ISBN: 2-8001-0005-2

Chronology
- Preceded by: Il y a un sorcier à Champignac, 1951
- Followed by: Spirou et les héritiers, 1952

Les Chapeaux noirs, album in the Belgian comic series Spirou et Fantasio, released in 1952. The album contains the longer story Les Chapeaux noirs written and drawn by Franquin, and three shorter stories, Mystère à la frontière by Franquin, and Comme une mouche au plafond and Spirou et les hommes-grenouilles by Jijé. All the stories were previously serialised in the Franco-Belgian comics magazine Spirou between 1949-50.

== Story overviews ==
In Les Chapeaux noirs (The Black Hats), Spirou and Fantasio go on assignment for Le Moustique and travel to USA, on assignment to report on the status of Wild West. Upon arrival they are disappointed to find a modern culture, but by chance meet a man who directs them to Tombstone, a town with all the western myths intact.

In Comme une mouche au plafond (Like a Fly on the Ceiling), Spirou surprisingly finds himself levitating in his apartment. This phenomenon turns out to be caused by the wizard neighbour whom Spirou and Fantasio must outwit in order to stop his mischief.

In Les Hommes-grenouilles (The Frog-Men), Spirou and Spip take the train to meet Fantasio in the Mediterranean village Cassis-sur-Mer where he currently lives in his boat while trying his luck in the tourism industry. But as crime flourishes abundantly in the area, they eventually find themselves in a dangerous maritime adventure.

In Mystère à la frontière (The Border Mystery), the heroes investigate a case currently reported in the papers, hoping to expose a smuggling ring responsible for bringing into Belgium a new drug, "Hicoine".

== Background ==
The title story draws upon Franquin's experiences in the United States, when he joined Jijé and Morris on a journey to absorb American culture. While the other two harvested a great deal of material for their western series Jerry Spring and Lucky Luke, Franquin limited his United States-inspired work to the shorter story Les Chapeaux noirs. Upon completing it, he went directly to work on Mystère à la frontière, another short story featuring a fairly harmless drug, and from there started work on Il y a un sorcier à Champignac. Since this became the launch of the series' stories told in long, in-depth context, this last prior work marks the end of the Spirou short story period.
