= Tembo Tabou =

Twenty-fourth Spirou et Fantasio album

Spirou et Fantasio #24 Tembo Tabou
- Cover of the Belgian edition
- Date: 1974
- Series: Spirou et Fantasio
- Publisher: Dupuis

Creative team
- Writers: Franquin with Greg
- Artists: Franquin with Jean Roba

Original publication
- Published in: Le Parisien Libéré, Spirou magazine
- Issues: Unknown, #1721 - #1723, #1420
- Date of publication: 1959, 1971
- Language: French
- ISBN: 2-8001-0351-5

Chronology
- Preceded by: Tora Torapa, 1973
- Followed by: Le gri-gri du Niokolo-Koba, 1974

Tembo Tabou, written by Franquin and Greg, drawn by Franquin and Jean Roba, is the twenty-fourth album of the Spirou et Fantasio series, and the twentieth under Franquin's authorship. The story was initially serialised in Le Parisien Libéré in 1959, and later in Spirou magazine, before it was published, along with the Marsupilami story La Cage, as a hardcover album in 1974.

== Story ==
In Tembo Tabou, Spirou and Fantasio find themselves on another expedition travelling upstream an African river, in search of vanished American author Oliver Gurgling Thirstywell. Events become increasingly more strange when they discover red elephants, befriend a pygmy tribe, learn of Marsupilami's love of eating warrior ants, and confront a gang of "protection racket" thugs who cultivate meat-eating plants.

The story The Cage chronicles an awful day at work for intrepid poacher Bring M. Backalive, obsessed with capturing a living sample of a baby Marsupilami, who learns the cost of angering a Marsupilami father.

== Background ==
The title story of this album was produced in the period between the making of Spirou et les hommes-bulles and QRN sur Bretzelburg.

== Trivia ==
In the 1970s, Swedish publishing house Carlsen Comics deemed the story's contents to be racially offensive, and the album was never published in Sweden. However, it was published in Denmark by Interpresse. The story was later published in Sweden in book form, included in the collected series of Franquin's Spirou.
