= Zorglub =

Fictional character in Spirou et Fantasio comic strip series

Zorglub using his "zorglonde", art by André Franquin

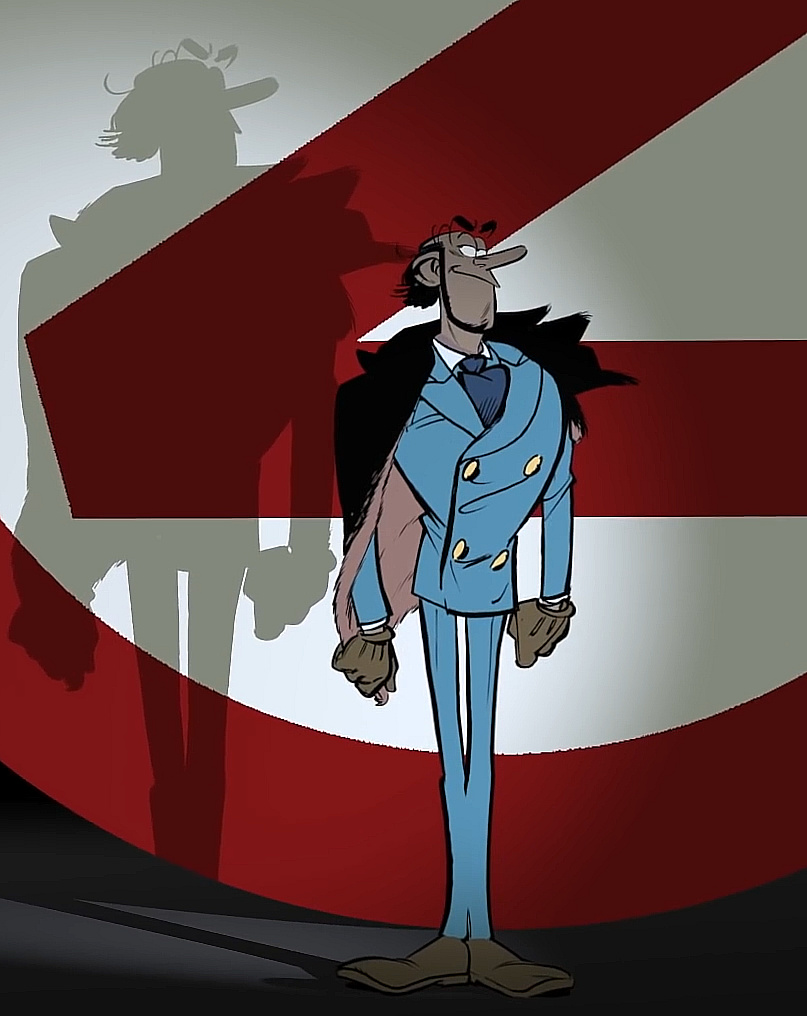
Zorglub in the series spin-off of the same name.

Zorglub is a fictional character in the Belgian comic strip Spirou et Fantasio, created by Greg and André Franquin, and first appeared in the serialised story Z comme Zorglub in Spirou magazine in 1959, later published in the diptych albums "Z comme Zorglub" (1961) and "L'ombre du Z" (1962). Zorglub's character was initially that of a sinister megalomaniac, mad scientist, but also a clumsy and bungling one who later reformed and became a friend and ally to the protagonists.

== Character profile ==
=== Prior history ===
He was a student in Brussels during his youth and became friends with the Count of Champignac and Miss Flanner. After a failed experiment to attract the moon maxed out all the university's money, he not only became the laughing stock of the campus but was expelled as well.

=== First meeting and evolution ===
He reappears with the intent of starting an experiment on the moon, but he wants the association of his friend the Count, willingly or not. He has reformed entire villages into bases for his army made from hypnotized policemen, the zorglhommes. With them he manages to steal several military secrets and technology, including the zorglumobile. As the album progresses, he repents and starts dismantling his bases.

After dismantling all but one of his bases he is again sent on the evil path by Zantafio. When Zantafio betrays him by showing that all that he desires is power, Zorglub is shot and becomes catatonic. After the ordeal he reverts to the mental state of a child but with the help of the Count, Spirou and Fantasio he is cured and rehabilitated.

=== Overall ===
An impressive arch-villain, his initial appearance is that of a visionary evil genius, but the comical aspects of the character soon come through. Although possessing a great deal of advanced machinery, his only true invention (as he admits) is the "zorglonde" (zorglwave, a mind-control radio wave).

He boasts that he could, if he wanted to, take over the world, but considers it too petty for a man of his genius. His real aim is to be recognized as the greatest scientist of all time, but being eccentric, schizophrenic and with a big ego, he has a tendency to make foolish mistakes which lead to his downfall. He later rehabilitates, but his ego is never "shot down" which makes him an easy target to manipulate as evidenced in the album Tora Torapa.

In the latest album La Face cachée du Z, Zorglub has built a space base on the other side of the Moon... but that forced him to bow before investors and build them a lunapark. That makes him so mad he finally decides to be a villain again, this time in space, and (supposedly) far from humans.

Zorglub also had his own series of spinoff albums, written and drawn by José Luis Munuera, where he is shown having constructed himself a robotic daughter named Zandra and getting in trouble with various high-ranking individuals over his inventions.

=== Machinery and manpower ===
His major invention is the "Zorglonde" which he uses to bring others under his spell. Depending on the wave level, the zorglonde can be used to temporarily hypnotise whole populations, prevent outsiders from approaching Zorglub's bases or having an entire army under his control. Zorglub uses the zorglonde to steal inventions developed by others which he then claims as his own. He also turns police officers from all over the world into his soldiers, known as Zorglhommes (Zorgl-men), who operate his worldwide secret bases. Zorglub designed a special language to talk with his zorglhommes in order to maintain the secrecy of his plans. It's just normal speech spelled backwards: "Gnol evil Bulgroz!" translates as "Long live Zorglub!"

In Le réveil du Z (1986), Spirou and Fantasio travel through time and meet Zorglub's son, who has followed into his father's footsteps and conquered the world of the future. Zorglub junior looks exactly like his father, but he suffers from dwarfism. This however adds some irony, as he still refers to himself as The Great Zorglub.

== Appearances ==
Spirou & Fantasio

- 15. Z comme Zorglub (Franquin)
- 16. L'ombre du Z (Franquin)
- 19. Panade à Champignac (Franquin)
- 20. Le faiseur d'or (Fournier)
- 23. Tora Torapa (Fournier)
- 37. Le réveil du Z (Tome & Janry)
- 50. Aux sources du Z (Jean-David Yann Morvan and José-Luis Munuera)

Spin-off series

- 1. La fille du Z (José-Luis Munuera)
- 2. L'apprenti méchant (Munuera)
- 3. Lady Z (Munuera)

== See also ==
- List of characters in Spirou et Fantasio

== Sources ==
- Spirou et Fantasio Les Personnages: Zorglub spirou.com (in French)
- Spirou et Fantasio Personnages > Zorglub Archived 2007-12-17 at the Wayback Machine franquin.com (in French)

Footnotes
