= Les pirates du silence =

Spirou et Fantasio #10 Les pirates du silence
- Cover of the Belgian edition
- Date: 1958
- Series: Spirou et Fantasio
- Publisher: Dupuis

Creative team
- Writers: Franquin with Maurice Rosy
- Artists: Franquin with Will

Original publication
- Published in: Spirou magazine
- Issues: 1. 907 - #940
- Date of publication: 1955 - 1956
- Language: French
- ISBN: 2-8001-0012-5

Chronology
- Preceded by: Le repaire de la murène, 1957
- Followed by: Le gorille a bonne mine, 1959

Les pirates du silence, written and drawn by Franquin, is the tenth album of the Spirou et Fantasio series. The title story, and another, La Quick Super, were serialised in Spirou magazine before both were published in one hardcover album in 1958.

== Story ==
In The Pirates of Silence, Fantasio gets an assignment from Le Moustique to write a story about Incognito City, a highly modernized city inhabited by wealthy celebrities and where security is tight and photography strictly forbidden. Fantasio gets around this by hiding miniature cameras in everyday items such as his pipe. But before he and Spirou leave, the Marsupilami surprisingly appears at their home, having somehow traveled alone from the Count's mansion in Champignac. Unable to reach the Count by phone, they drive to Incognito City and have an unpleasant traffic encounter with Juan Corto Dos Orejas, leaving them with a bad impression and a small object found on the ground. Further encounters with thugs and suspicious events slowly expose a fiendish plot, involving the kidnapping of the Count of Champignac.

In The Quick Super, Fantasio sets out to test-drive a "Quick" (a large car manufactured by Genial Motors) for the week-end, in order to write a review for Spirou Méchanique. There are mysterious elements however, as all previously test-driven Quicks have ended up stolen, and this one is no exception. As the events unfold, old acquaintances from Circus Zabaglione (from Les voleurs du Marsupilami) reappear.

== Background ==
This album most famously reveals another of Marsupilami's remarkable attributes, namely its ability to perfectly mimic human words.
