= Le gorille a bonne mine =

Spirou et Fantasio #11 Le gorille a bonne mine
- Cover of the Belgian edition
- Date: 1959
- Series: Spirou et Fantasio
- Publisher: Dupuis

Creative team
- Writers: Franquin
- Artists: Franquin

Original publication
- Published in: Spirou magazine
- Issues: 1. 944 - #966 #1023 - #1033
- Date of publication: 1956; 1957-1958
- Language: French
- ISBN: 2-8001-0013-3

Chronology
- Preceded by: Les pirates du silence, 1958
- Followed by: Le nid des Marsupilamis, 1960

Le gorille a bonne mine, written and drawn by Franquin, is the eleventh album of the Spirou et Fantasio series. The title story and Vacances sans histoires (A Quiet Holiday), were serialised in Spirou magazine, before the hardcover album release in 1959.

The title literally means roughly The Gorilla's in Good Shape, but the title is also a pun on the "mine d'or" ("goldmine") which appears in the story.

When Egmont (on its imprint "Euro Books") published this album in English for the Indian market, it was given the title "The Gorilla Gold Adventure".

== Story ==
In Le gorille a bonne mine, Spirou and Fantasio journey to Molomonga in central Africa, on a journalistic expedition to seek out the rare gorillas of Mount Kilimaki. In a setting of uneasy atmosphere amidst questionable characters and unlikely accidents, their efforts become increasingly difficult, justifying the suspicion that someone tries to prevent the reporters from reaching their goal.

In Vacances sans histoires, the heroes take a road-trip south to the French riviera. This leads to an encounter with Ibn-Mah-Zoud, an abundantly wealthy sheikh and allegedly the worst motorcar driver in the world, and who tries out their Turbotraction:Turbot-Rhino I.

== Background ==
During the title story's original serial publication in Spirou, it was named Le gorille à mauvaise mine, but, after previously published La mauvaise tête, the hardcover album was renamed by editors who wanted to avoid establishing a trend of negative names (i.e. The Bad Head, The Bad Expression).

With Vacances sans histoires, this album contains the second Spirou adventure cameo appearance of Gaston Lagaffe, although the first would be released in a later album, Le voyageur du Mésozoïque.

At the end of Vacances sans histoires, the Turbot 2 is revealed for the first time, as a replacement for the Turbotraction wrecked by the Sheik.
