= Henri Gillain =

- Born: 1913
- Died: 10 August 1999 (age 85–86)
- Area: writer
- Pseudonyms: Jean Darc, Luc Bermar
- Notable works: Spirou et Fantasio

Henri Gillain (1913 – 10 August 1999) was a Belgian teacher and comics enthusiast who on several occasions wrote scripts for Franco-Belgian comics publications in the segment known as Bande Dessinée. He was a brother of Joseph Gillain, famous by the pseudonym Jijé.

== Contributions ==
Although committed to his career as a math teacher, Henri Gillain followed with interest the early developments of comic strips in Belgium, and the artistic evolution of his brother, Jijé, eventually considered by many the second pioneer of Belgian comics after Hergé.

In the late 40s he turned contributor when he submitted a script to André Franquin, his brother's protégé, in the shape of a thick notebook which contained the ideas that would result in Spirou magazine serialised story, Il y a un sorcier à Champignac, and serve as a platform for the entire series Spirou et Fantasio. Upon publication in 1950, Henri Gillain took the pseudonym Jean Darc, a play on the name Jeanne d'Arc.

In 1952, Henri Gillain submitted another script to Will, another young artist nurtured by his brother, a scenario for Tif et Tondu, Le Trésor d'Alaric, and would on this occasion use the pseudonym Luc Bermar. During this time he was also an anonymous contributor to Jijé's Blondin et Cirage story Nègre Blanc.

In 1959, he further wrote the scenario for Lambil's debut work with "Sandy", Une Aventure en Australie.

== Sources ==
- Henri Gillain publications in Le Journal de Spirou BDoubliées (in French)

Footnotes
