= Le prisonnier du Bouddha =

1960 Issue #14 of Franco-Belgian comics series Spirou & Fantasio

Spirou et Fantasio #14 Le prisonnier du Bouddha
- Cover of the Belgian edition
- Date: 1960
- Series: Spirou et Fantasio
- Publisher: Dupuis

Creative team
- Writers: Franquin with Greg
- Artists: Franquin with Jidéhem

Original publication
- Published in: Spirou magazine
- Issues: 1. 1048 - #1082
- Date of publication: 1958-1959
- Language: French
- ISBN: 2-8001-0016-8

Chronology
- Preceded by: Le voyageur du Mésozoïque, 1960
- Followed by: Z comme Zorglub, 1961

Le prisonnier du Bouddha, written by Franquin and Greg, drawn by Franquin with assistance by Jidéhem, is the fourteenth album of the Spirou et Fantasio series. The story was initially serialised in Spirou magazine before its release as a hardcover album in 1960.

== Story ==
In The Prisoner of the Buddha, Spirou and Fantasio arrive in Champignac to find great changes in the Count's mansion park. A Russian scientist, Nicolas Inovskyev, the co-inventor of a revolutionary and powerful device named the G.A.G., is in hiding, fearing the same fate as his American partner Harold W. Longplaying. Longplaying has been kidnapped by the Chinese army, who want his technology, and is being held captive in one of a series of giant statues of the Buddha which line up a valley. Armed with the new invention, the heroes set out to rescue the prisoner, and save the world.

== Background ==
Featured in this album are two seemingly British, twin-like and awkward investigators, in what may be a homage to Hergé's The Adventures of Tintin characters, Dupont et Dupond (Thomson and Thompson).
