= Quatre aventures de Spirou et Fantasio =

First album of the Spirou & Fantasio series by Franquin

Spirou et Fantasio #1 Quatre aventures de Spirou et Fantasio
- Cover of the Belgian edition
- Date: 1950
- Series: Spirou et Fantasio
- Publisher: Dupuis

Creative team
- Writers: Franquin
- Artists: Franquin

Original publication
- Published in: Le Journal de Spirou
- Issues: 1. 522 - #540 #541 - #566 #567 - #574 #589 - #616
- Date of publication: 1948 - 1950
- Language: French
- ISBN: 2-8001-0003-6

Chronology
- Preceded by: Spirou et Fantasio, 1948
- Followed by: Il y a un sorcier à Champignac, 1951

Quatre aventures de Spirou et Fantasio, written and drawn by Franquin, is a collection of four stories from serial publication between 1948 and 1950 in Spirou magazine, namely Spirou et les plans du robot, Spirou sur le ring, Spirou fait du cheval, and Spirou chez les Pygmées. Together they were released as the first official series Spirou et Fantasio hardcover album in 1950.

== Story ==
In The Robot Drawings, Spirou and Fantasio have a hunch they need to protect the world from criminals getting their hands on mad Professor Samovar's blueprints for a robot with doomsday potential. This is the sequel to Radar le robot from 1947.

In Spirou in the Ring, Poildur, a neighbour bully, challenges Spirou to a boxing match, who nobly accepts and asks Fantasio to coach him. An entire Brussels working class community turns out for the big event, and an epic boxing match of courage against cheating tactics is played out. On this occasion, Spirou's weight is revealed to be 40.8 kg.

In Spirou Rides a Horse, Fantasio attempts to mix it up with the upper class by playing the equestrian dandy gentleman, and Spirou reluctantly joins him to go horseback riding. Fantasio is given a very noble steed named Artaban, while Spirou's horse, Plumeau, is ridiculously unhorselike.

In Spirou meets the Pygmies, a leopard escaped from the zoo assaults Spirou and Spip during a forest picnic trip, but they manage to become friendly. Unable to adopt and keep it in the apartment, Spirou and Fantasio must take it home to an African island, leading to adventures with pygmy tribes and arms-dealing villains.

== Background ==
Franquin's drawing style of this period, while it closely resembles the style of Jijé whose characters he had suddenly inherited, shows the first steps in developing his personal interpretation the characters and maturing storytelling skills, illustrated by comparing the very early first two stories with the two latter.

Another apparent influence is that of Franquin's boarding mate at the time, Morris whose Lucky Luke character Jolly Jumper's insane cousin appears to have a starring role as Plumeau in Spirou fait du cheval. The facial likeness of Morris is also lampooned in Spirou sur le ring as Spirou's little do-good friend called P'tit Maurice.

== English translation ==
This book was translated to English in India by Egmont' subsidiary Euro Books in 2007, under the title "The Robot Blueprints and Four Other Stories".
