= Z comme Zorglub =

Fifteenth album of the Spirou & Fantasio series by Franquin

Spirou et Fantasio #15 Z comme Zorglub Z is for Zorglub
- Cover of the Belgian edition
- Date: 1961
- Series: Spirou et Fantasio
- Publisher: Dupuis

Creative team
- Writers: Franquin with Greg
- Artists: Franquin with Jidéhem

Original publication
- Published in: Spirou magazine
- Issues: 1. 1096 - #1136
- Date of publication: 1959-1960
- Language: French
- ISBN: 2-8001-0017-6

Translation
- Publisher: Fantasy Flight Publishing
- Date: 1995
- ISBN: 0-3163-5852-5
- Translator: Kim Thompson

Chronology
- Preceded by: Le prisonnier du Bouddha, 1960
- Followed by: L'ombre du Z, 1962

Z comme Zorglub, written and drawn by Franquin, is the fifteenth album of the Spirou et Fantasio series, and the first part of Franquin's Zorglub diptych. The story was initially serialised in Spirou magazine before its release as a hardcover album in 1961.

== Story ==
In Z is for Zorglub, Fantasio receives a hair dryer as a gift from a secret admirer, but its unexpected hypnotic abilities announce a new ominous presence in the Spirou universe. Zorglub, an old acquaintance of the Count of Champignac, appears from the past and offers the Count the chance to join him in seizing world domination, but it is firmly rejected. In response, Zorglub proceeds to demonstrate his powers by manipulating the township of Champignac to storm the Count's mansion, which nearly leads to the destruction of his laboratory. As this just barely fails, Zorglub decides to kidnap Fantasio, to "zorglhomize" him into a zorglhomme (zorglman), forcing Spirou and the Count to travel to the village of Zorgland, and attempt to outwit the criminal mastermind.

== Background ==
Spirou published in English

Along with the introduction of the new arch-enemy Zorglub, a few inventions and vehicles associated with him are seen for the first time, most impressively the Zorglumobile and the Zorglécoptère. Another first is the stunning weapon of the zorglhomme, the Zorglonde (Zorglwave or perhaps Z-ray).

Champignac town gendarme (policeman) Jérôme is seen for the first time, and is given the distinction of becoming the first zorglhomme of Champignac-en-Cambrousse.

The album was translated into English by Kim Thompson and released in 1995
