= Il y a un sorcier à Champignac =

Second album of the Spirou & Fantasio series by Franquin

Spirou et Fantasio #2 Il y a un sorcier à Champignac
- Cover of the Belgian edition
- Date: 1951
- Series: Spirou et Fantasio
- Publisher: Dupuis

Creative team
- Writers: Franquin with Jijé; Scenario by Jean Darc
- Artists: Franquin

Original publication
- Published in: Spirou magazine
- Issues: 1. 653 - #685
- Date of publication: 1950 - 1951
- Language: French
- ISBN: 2-8001-0004-4

Chronology
- Preceded by: Quatre aventures de Spirou et Fantasio, 1950
- Followed by: Les chapeaux noirs, 1952

Il y a un sorcier à Champignac, by Franquin, is the second album of the Spirou et Fantasio series, and the first to tell a long intricate story in what would become the Spirou tradition, in contrast to the previous short format stories. After serial publication in Spirou magazine, it was released as a complete hardcover album in 1951.

This work introduces several key characters in the series, and the village of Champignac-en-Cambrousse (a name derived from the French word for mushrooms, and 'cambrousse' meaning rural backwater).

== Story ==
In There is a Sorcerer in Champignac, Spirou and Fantasio go on a bicycle camping trip to the country and end up near the village of Champignac-en-Cambrousse. They meet its pompous mayor and rustic inhabitants, and an aloof local landowner, the Count of Champignac. Strange phenomena are affecting farm and wild animals, and the frightened villagers blame a gypsy who is passing through. Spirou and Fantasio, however, discover that the real culprit is the Count, deeply involved in creating strange concoctions from mushrooms, and they rescue the vagabond from a lynch mob. Later, the Count creates a drug that within a limited time will endow superhuman strength, which a gangster steals to create mayhem.

== Background ==
This album confirms the evolution in Franquin's style from his previous Spirou works, now distinct from Jijé's Spirou. It is Franquin's first long format story.

Jijé is credited as co-author of the script, following a scenario by Jean Darc, alias Henri Gillain, Jijé's brother, who is attributed with the conception of the Count of Champignac and his eccentric mushroom creations.
