= Panade à Champignac =

Spirou et Fantasio #19 Panade à Champignac
- Cover of the Belgian edition
- Date: 1969
- Series: Spirou et Fantasio
- Publisher: Dupuis

Creative team
- Writers: Franquin with Peyo, Gos
- Artists: Franquin with Jidéhem

Original publication
- Published in: Spirou magazine
- Issues: 1. 1539 - #1556, #1435 - #1455
- Date of publication: 1967 - 1968, 1965 - 1966
- Language: French
- ISBN: 2-8001-0021-4

Chronology
- Preceded by: QRN sur Bretzelburg, 1966
- Followed by: Le faiseur d'or, 1970

Panade à Champignac is the nineteenth album of the Spirou et Fantasio series. The story, written and drawn by Franquin, was serialised along with Bravo les Brothers in Spirou magazine before publication as a hardcover album in 1969.

== Story ==
In Babysitting in Champignac, Spirou and Fantasio, the latter stressed by the pressures of work and the aggravating presence of Gaston Lagaffe - take a break at the estate of Champignac. Upon arrival, they learn that the Count's life has changed dramatically since the conclusion of L'ombre du Z, as he now spends his time taking care of Zorglub who has regressed to the mental age of 8 months. To make things worse, one of Zorglub's "zorglmen", Otto Paparapap, has not been healed, and lurks nearby, armed with the paralyzing zorglonde and obsessed with liberating his former leader...

Bravo Les Brothers, takes a small step back in time to illustrate the hectic working conditions at Dupuis publishing house prior to Spirou and Fantasio's much needed vacation. The influence of Gaston in the pursuit of having De Mesmaeker sign contracts is a well-explored theme in Gaston albums, but in this instance, there is the added element of "Les Brothers", a circus act of performing chimpanzees that Gaston gifts Fantasio for his birthday.

== Background ==
By 1968, Franquin had long since lost interest in Spirou et Fantasio—a series he had not created—and was now more inspired by his own Gaston Lagaffe. The strain shows clearly in Panade, a fairly grotesque story where the former globe-trotting heroes are reduced to changing the diapers of a grown man. The multiple fake endings are another blatant symptom of Franquin's irritation. By contrast, the hilarious and lively Bravo les Brothers was described by Franquin himself as basically a Gaston story in disguise—it features the familiar setting and characters—as well as his own favourite. The character of the grumpy animal-training genius Noé, introduced here, was resurrected decades later by Yann for the Marsupilami series.

This was to be Franquin's final album as Spirou author as the task was passed on to Fournier, allowing Franquin to focus on Gaston Lagaffe.
