= Natacha (comics) =

Belgian comics series

- Natacha, hôtesse de l'air (1971)

Publication information
- Publisher: Spirou, Dupuis and Marsu Productions
- First appearance: 1970
- Created by: Walthéry and Gos

Natacha is a Belgian comics series, created by François Walthéry and Gos. Drawn by Walthéry, its stories have been written by several authors including Gos, Peyo, Maurice Tillieux, Raoul Cauvin and Marc Wasterlain.

== Synopsis ==
The series tells the adventures of Natacha, a young sexy flight attendant in the service of the flight company Bardaf, and her clumsy, hot-tempered colleague and friend Walter, with occasional participation by her flight captain Turbo and his co-pilot Legrain. Occasionally, the story evolves into Natacha and Walter retelling the adventures of their grandparents, Natacha's museum conservator grandmother (also named Natacha) and Walter's pilot grandfather (also named Walter), in the Roaring Twenties and Thirties.

== Publication history ==
Natacha was first published in the Franco-Belgian comics magazine Spirou on February 26, 1970. The series eventually ended serial publication in Spirou, leaving its publisher Dupuis, and began publishing albums only through Marsu Productions in 1989, starting with the album Cauchemirage. In 2013, the Marsu Productions was bought up by Dupuis.

== List of volumes ==
=== Albums by Dupuis ===
| French title | Date of publication | English translation | Writer | Artist |
|---|---|---|---|---|
| "Natacha, Hôtesse de l'Air" | 1971 | Natacha, Air Hostess | Gos | Walthéry |
Natacha and Walter are taken on a charter flight to ferry a South American soccer team back home, along with a shipment of gold bullions. However, the soccer team has been secretly replaced by a team of gangsters, who hijack the plane and force it to land in the South American jungle. Separated from her crewmates when the plane crashes, Natacha must enlist the aid of a tribe of native headhunters to rescue them and thwart the gangsters before they can escape with the gold.
| "Natacha et le Maharadjah" | 1972 | Natacha and the Maharadjah | Gos | Walthéry |
In the South Asian nation of Kajasthan, despotic prince Mahmoud Zarrad has dethroned his older brother, Maharadjah Tchandar Abkar, who then fled into a mountain fortress which is impregnable except from the air. Zarrad intends to hire Fortemps, a world-class parachuting coach, to train paratroopers to conquer the fortress; when Fortemps refuses, Zarrad tries to kill him, only to be thwarted by Fortemps' students Natacha and Walter. The next day, when he discovers that Natacha and Walter are serving on the plane he's flying on, he exploits an emergency to have the aircraft land in Kajasthan, where he has them both arrested on trumped-up spy charges in order to have them "persuade" Fortemps. However, a band of Abkar loyalists enables their escape, and so Natacha and Walter flee towards Abkar's stronghold, hounded by Zarrad and his elite guard.
| "La Mémoire de Métal" | 1974 | Metal Memory | Étienne Borgers | Walthéry |
La Mémoire de Métal: One night, Marty, a stewardess colleague of Natacha, knocks on the latter's door with a desperate plea for help. She and several of her colleagues have gotten involved in a diamond smuggling operation, but during her last assignment she damaged the container the gems were in, and for some unknown reason the organizers of the smuggling scheme seem awfully interested in the box. However, this now unwittingly gets Natacha targeted as well, and the smuggling caper is eventually revealed as an espionage case, forcing Natacha and a repentant pilot to fight for their very survival. Un Brin de Panique ("A Bit of Panic", written by Marc Westerlain): With Walter taking a hard-earned rest, Natacha must break in two new stewards on her next flight. When one of the newbies injures himself just before takeoff, Walter has to fill in. To make matters worse, their flight becomes the target of a vicious blackmailer.
| "Un Trône pour Natacha" | 1975 | A Throne for Natacha | Maurice Tillieux | Walthéry |
Natacha catches the eye of the king of the African country of Thénia, and he invites her to his embassy with designs to marry her. This fits in conveniently with the National Security Service, and they hire Natacha for a clandestine investigation against Colonel von Tripp, a dangerous conman who has gained the king's confidence and is part of his entourage travelling to Belgium for an important treaty. Natacha and Walter, who is hired on as a cook, discover that von Tripp is conducting a secret smuggling operation right under the unknowing king's nose - but their discovery puts them right into von Tripp's crosshairs. Note: This story features comic artists Fournier and Hubinon as truckers; von Tripp is patterned after cartoonist Sirius (Max Mayeu); the National Security chief is a caricature of Thierry Martens; and one of the NS agents is based on Sammy Davis Jr.
| "Double Vol" | 1976 | Double Flight | Mittéï & Walthéry | Walthéry |
Double Vol: During her next flight service, Natacha suddenly hijacks the plane, forcing it to land somewhere in Bavaria, and blackmails a foreign ambassador for five million dollars. But as it is gradually revealed, Natacha is the victim of a vicious blackmail scheme herself. L'Étoile du Berger ("The Evening Star", written by Gos): While waiting for Walter to celebrate Christmas Eve together, Natacha is ambushed and tied up by a duo of gangsters, one of whom takes her uniform and place on the next flight to steal a fabled gemstone. Un Tour de Passe-Passe ("A Sleight of Hand", script by Lemasque): While transporting a number of conjurers, all passengers suddenly fall asleep, one of them ends up murdered, another disappears, and the crew is informed of a dangerous spy hiding aboard.
| "Le Treizième Apôtre" | 1978 | The Thirteenth Apostle | Maurice Tillieux | Walthéry |
For their vacation, Natacha convinces an archeologist to allow her and Walter to accompany him to Turkey, where the professor is looking for the lost tomb of Jesus' fabled thirteenth apostle, Matthias. However, a former assistant of the professor, dismissed for illegally selling artefacts on the black market, and her henchman are deternimed to line their own pockets with such a sensational find - and will not stop at anything, including murder, to claim their prize.
| "L'Hôtesse et Monna Lisa" | 1979 | The Hostess and Mona Lisa | Mittéï | Walthéry & Pierre Seron |
In the first part of the album, Natacha and Walter reminisce about the time their grandparents first met while transporting the famed Mona Lisa, only to be ambushed by sky pirates hired by the director of the airport the flight started from. The second half deals with Natacha's flight, a transport of a crowd of famed comic artists, getting kidnapped by a pair of little girls and their guardian to the private island of Katoukikas, the girls' father and a notorious arms dealer. Katoukikas wants the artists to create an exclusive comic collection for his daughters, but while they will be paid, they will not be allowed to leave. In order to free her friends and the artists, Natacha is forced to adopt drastic measures - in the form of a team of heavyweight boxers. Note: The second story, Natacha et Les Petits Miquets ("Natasha and the Little Mickey Mouses", script by Walthéry and Mittéï), co-stars various famous European comic artists and writers of that era, including Berck, Cauvin, Deliège, Delporte, Devos (Raymond Devos), Fournier, Francis (Francis Bertrand), Franquin, Hausman, Hubinon, Jidèhem, Jijé, Lampil, Leloup, Macherot, Mittéi, Morris, Peyo, Piroton (Arthur Piroton), Roba, Sirius (Max Mayeu), Tacq, Tillieux, Vittorio, Wasterlain (Marc Wasterlain), Will, and (naturally) Walthéry and Gos themselves.
| "Instantanés pour Caltech" | 1981 | Snapshots for Caltech | Étienne Borgers | Walthéry & Jidéhem |
On their way to New York for a well-deserved break, Walter and Natacha spot a mysterious glowing object in the sky. Making a hasty snapshot of it, Walter takes his discovery to Caltech, where one of its professors, Andrew Warring, identifies the object as a genuine UFO. With this proof, Warring intends to make contact with the "aliens"; but he, Natacha and Walter face opposition from the FBI, who try everything in their power to keep Warring's discovery away from the public. They manage to track a UFO landing, but are kidnapped by the vessel's occupants. Walter escapes from their captors, only to discover that they are not aliens, but androids with the ability to control minds, while Natacha and the mindwiped Warring are sent back to Caltech with an android minder to erase any trace of the UFO's existence.
| "Les Machines Incertaines" | 1983 | The Uncertain Machines | Étienne Borgers | Walthéry & Jidéhem |
While Natacha is forced to help undo Warring's lifetime discovery, Walter escapes the ship after it lands, only to run into a group of humans who have formed a resistance movement against the androids. He learns that the androids are actually time travellers; he is now stuck in the year 2484, where the androids, originally servants of mankind, have covertly subjugated their former masters. To return to his own time, Walter must organize his ragtag band of allies into a fighting force using the weapons the androids have collected in their investigative time quests about their origins.
| "L'Ile d'Outre-Monde" | 1984 | The Island Beyond the World | Marc Wasterlain | Walthéry & Will |
Due to a chain of unfortunate circumstances, an insane pyromaniac boards the flight Natacha and Walter are serving on and sets the plane on fire, causing a crashlanding in the midst of the Pacific Ocean. Separated from the other passengers by a storm, Natacha and Walter are swept up on a lonely island, where they end up stuck for months trying to survive. It is only then that they discover that they have a murderous monster as a cohabitant.
| "Le Grand Pari" | 1985 | The Big Bet | Mittéï | Walthéry & Laudec |
Three months after their island misadventure, Natacha and Walter meet by chance and exchange another story about their grandparents. A drunken Grandpa Walter was tricked by the director of his flight company into a bet, and after causing an accident while winning it, he accepted a challenge from his friends during another drunken bout to fly across the world in 40 days. After Walter accidentally "kidnapped" Grandma Natacha along the way, and a harrowing journey across the British Isles, the Arctic Circle and North America, they gained an unwanted additional passenger after an emergency landing in an Amazon swamps. Note: Historical cameo: Louis Armstrong.
| "Les Culottes de Fer" | 1986 | The Iron Panties | Mittéï | Walthéry & Laudec |
After an intermission to get some sleep for the rest of the night, Natacha and Walter continue their story. After their grandparents had cleared the Andes, their mystery passenger revealed himself as Grandpa Walter's boss, who had stowed away on the plane due to a bet on his own with the secretary of transportation, which would see his flight company nationalized if he lost. After making it back to Belgium, Walter lost his bet by one day, but his boss won his own, bringing the tale to an ultimately happy end. Note: The titular "Iron Panties" are a gang of thugs under a tyrannical President named Mogadon, whose conflict with a Philippinian tribe creates a brief obstacle for the protagonists. Historical cameos: Jacques Brel and the Yellow Expedition.
| "Les Nomades du Ciel" | 1988 | Sky Nomads | Mittéï | Walthéry & Laudec |
The first part of the story exposes Natacha and her friends to a load of lunatics and a botched illicit information trade; the resulting stress to their nerves and an accidental sedative overdose results in their temporary internment. By the time they are ready to resume their duties, Natacha's crew is kidnapped and brought onboard a 747 belonging to the General, a surprisingly benevolent ex-dictator. Because he wanted democratic reforms for his home country, he made some powerful enemies and was exiled; and because the rest of the world fears those enemies' wrath, the General is not allowed to land anywhere, except for brief resupplying and emergencies. After his two original pilots had inadvertently drugged themselves, he has now "hired" Natacha and her friends to take their places - doomed to forever fly across the globe, unless Natacha thinks of something to alleviate this uncomfortable situation.

=== Albums by Marsu Productions ===
| French title | Date of publication | English translation | Writer | Artist |
|---|---|---|---|---|
| "Cauchemirage" | 1989 | Nightmare | Mythic | Walthéry & Mittéï |
The story revolves around Jedia Lee Crawfish, a billionaire tycoon who virtually lives aboard his private 747 jet. An unknown party makes an attempt on his flight crew's lives, causing them to be late for takeoff, so Crawfish simply "hires" Natacha and her friends for the next trip. However, a hijacker associated with the hostile party, a traitor aboard the plane, and Crawfish's highly advanced holographic illusion system turn this flight into a chaotic nightmare.
| "La Ceinture du Cherchemidi" | 1992 | The Chercemidi Belt | Peyo | Walthéry & Mittéï |
On their vacation together, Natacha and Walter meet Cherchemidi, an eccentric inventor who just perfected his greatest invention: A belt which projects a force field around its wearer, rendering him virtually untouchable. However, Walter steals the only functional prototype to have some fun, which puts both him and Natacha in the sights of a dictator eager to claim the belt for his dreams of world conquest. Note: The police inspector who aids Natacha and Walter in their case is a parody of Lieutenant Columbo.
| "L'Ange Blond" | 1992 | The Blonde Angel | Maurice Tillieux | Walthéry & Georges Van Linthout |
During a sojourn in London, Natacha takes the time to meet Betty, an old friend of hers. However, what she and Walter are forced to learn very quickly is that Betty is currently undertaking a secret document delivery mission as a favor to a friend in the MI5. What the three of them are not so quick to learn is that they are all mere decoys in a dangerous cat and mouse game for Her Majesty's Secret Service.
| "La Veuve Noire" | 1997 | The Black Widow | Michel Dusart | Walthéry & Georges Van Linthout |
On one of Natacha and Walter's flights to Mexico, a smuggled load of poisonous spiders, scorpions and snakes gets loose and causes panic among the passengers and crew. After a hasty emergency landing, it is discovered that one of the passengers, a millionaire, was poisoned - not by the animals, but by an assassin. The prime suspect is an infamous triple millionaire widow nicknamed Black Widow, but Natacha discovers that a different party is involved - and in her pursuit of that criminal, she finds a number of unexpected allies.
| "Natacha et les Dinosaures" | 1998 | Natacha and the Dinosaurs | Marc Wasterlain | Walthéry |
In Papua New Guinea, a volcanologist named Legof disappears while forced to land his helicopter in a remote jungle valley. A month later, Natacha and her friends chaperone a group of paleontology-enthusiastic schoolchildren who have won a Bardaf-sponsored competition, among them the children's teacher and her daughter, Legof's family, to an excavation site near the area where Legof was last known to be. By chance, the group finds a tunnel into the valley and find it inhabited by living dinosaurs. Note: This album borrows many plot elements from the movie Jurassic Park.
| "La Mer des Rochers" | 2004 | The Sea of Rocks | Peyo | Walthéry & Georges Van Linthout |
One day, Walter picks up a used copy of an Agatha Christie mystery novel, which Natacha temporarily confiscates. Right afterward, Walter's apartment is burgled, though nothing is stolen. Inside the book, Natacha discovers a computer disc containing a numerical code. And this code is a key element for the operations of a drug smuggling ring, who won't even stop at murder to get their property back. Note: This comic is an adaptation of Peyo's Jacky and Celestin story "Des Fleurs pour Mon Luger" (1961).
| "Atoll 66" | 2007 | Atoll 66 | Guy d'Artet | Walthéry & Di Sano |
While attending a ball held by her wealthy friend Count Froidbermont, Natacha receives an invitation for a sightseeing tour on the South Pacific Tiha-Tiha islands by his friend Horace Moulton, and Froidbermont's servant asks her to deliver a package to his son, who works for Moulton. However, once they arrive at Tiha-Tiha, Natacha and Walter abruptly get entangled in a smuggling operation involving Moulton, a crazed cult-leading witch doctor, and a pretty CIA agent. Note: A caricature of Gaston appears in the story as a clumsy police officer.
| "Le Regard du Passe" | 2010 | The Gaze of the Past | Martens | Walthéry |
While on forced vacation in Egypt after their plane has malfunctioned, Natacha and Walter are met by a eldery native who in the year 1938 guided Grandmother Natacha to a secret temple of Anty, a hawk deity dedicated to Horus, from which she emerged having lost a week's worth of memories. Determined to solve this mystery, Natacha embarks on a search for the temple, only to run into an old enemy and find an ancient secret which would provide one of the greatest archeological discoveries of all time - if only Walter hadn't brought his camera along. Historical cameos: Agatha Christie and Max Mallowan.
| "L’Épervier Bleu" | 2014 | Blue Hawk | Sirius (Max Mayeu) | Walthéry |
Being grounded in New York for the Christmas holidays due to a snowstorm, Natacha catches up on reading her grandmother's diaries. In 1948, having reunited after the end of World War Two, Grandmother Natacha and Grandfather Walter, along with Natacha's Algerian foster child Aicha, had undertaken a cruise in the South Pacific on the sailing ship Blue Hawk when they stumbled upon a sunken boat with a dead man aboard. Afterward, they met the sister of the deceased, Jane Morrison, and a gangster named Blackmoon, which got them entangled in a murderous plot to strip a hidden cove off its rich harvest of pearls.
| "Sur les traces de l'Épervier Bleu" | 2018 | On the Trail of the Blue Hawk | Sirius (Max Mayeu) | Walthéry |
Continuing the story from the previous album, Grandmother Natacha, Grandfather Walter, Aicha and Jane raced after Blackmoon to get the pearls back, only to find that Blackmoon's sponsor had his own plans for the gems, which resulted in a vicious three-way fight of betrayal and backstabbing.

=== Publications in magazines ===
1. Natacha, hôtesse de l'air (written by Gos), in Spirou n°1663 (February 26, 1970) - 1690 (March 3, 1970)
2. À un cheveux de la catastrophe (written by Gos), in Spirou n°1682 (July 9, 1970)
3. L'étoile du berger (written by Gos), in Spirou n°1706 (December 24, 1970)
4. Natacha et le Maharadjah (written by Gos), in Spirou n°1747 (July 7, 1971) - 1765 (February 10, 1972)
5. Un brin de panique (written by Marc Wasterlain), in Spirou n°1834 (7 juin 1973) à 1840 (19 juillet 1973)
6. La mémoire de métal (written by d'Étienne Borgers and François Walthéry), in Spirou n°1849 (September 20, 1973) - 1860 (December 6, 1973)
7. Natacha et la science-friction (written by J. Baert), in Spirou n°1860 (December 6, 1973)
8. Un trône pour Natacha (written by Maurice Tillieux), in Spirou n°1893 (July 27, 1974) - 1912 (December 5, 1974)
9. Double vol (written by Mittéï), in Spirou n°1928 (March 27, 1975) - 1937 (May 29, 1975)

== Media adaptations ==
In 2025, Natacha was also adapted into a live-action film, Natacha, Hôtesse de l'Air, directed by Noémie Saglio.

== Sources ==
- Natacha publications in Spirou BDoubliées (in French)
- Natacha albums Bedetheque (in French)
