= Capturez un Marsupilami =

Comic album

Marsupilami #0 Capturez un Marsupilami!
- Cover of the Belgian edition
- Date: 2002
- Series: Marsupilami
- Publisher: Marsu Productions

Creative team
- Writers: Franquin with Marcel Denis; Greg, Peyo, Gos; Yvan Delporte
- Artists: Franquin with Jidéhem, Will; Cerise (colors)

Original publication
- Published in: Spirou magazine
- Issues: 1. 975 - #2270
- Date of publication: 1955 - 1981
- Language: French
- ISBN: 2-9125-3645-6

Chronology
- Followed by: La Queue du Marsupilami, 1987

Capturez un Marsupilami!, written and drawn by André Franquin, is a comic album containing the adventures and short gags of the Marsupilami. Although not collected in one album until 2002, the contents are the earliest works of the original artist, from publications in Risque Tout and Spirou magazine, and therefore given the number 0 in the series of Marsupilami albums.

== Story ==
- Le Marsupilami descend sur la ville (The Marsupilami Goes to the Village), 1955
- Noël d’un bagarreur (A Warrior's Christmas), 1956
- La bûche de noël (The Work of Christmas), 1957
- Touchez pas aux rouges-gorges (Don't Touch the Robins), 1956
- Les patins téléguidés (The Remote-controlled Rollerskates), 1957
- Le homard (The Lobster), 1957
- Tarzan (previously named Houu Bai), 1977
- La cage (The Cage), 1965 #1420
- Capturer un marsupilami (To Capture a Marsupilami), 1977-1981

and 15 short gags from 1968 to 1972

== Background ==
For the 50th anniversary of the character, Marsu Productions assembled this album, composed of the majority of Franquin's Marsupilami solo stories. Touchez pas aux rouges-gorges and La cage had been included in Spirou et Fantasio albums, but other stories were previously published in varied forms of Spirou context. This release also collects Franquin's two stories featuring the intrepid poacher Bring M. Backalive, and a story featuring the secondary Spirou et Fantasio character Le Petit Noël.

The album's title was given by the title of the final story, Capturer un Marsupilami, but the verb tense is changed from infinitive to imperative, "to capture" to "capture!".

This album was first published in Scandinavia in the 80s (titled as Å fange Spiralis in Norway, Jag Marsupilami in Sweden, and Spirillen in Denmark).
