= Tora Torapa =

Spirou et Fantasio #23 Sonetmicrosystems
- Cover of the Belgian edition
- Date: 1973
- Series: Spirou et Fantasio
- Publisher: Dupuis

Creative team
- Writers: Fournier
- Artists: Fournier

Original publication
- Published in: Spirou magazine
- Issues: 1. 1801 - #1824
- Date of publication: 1972
- Language: French
- ISBN: 2-8001-0327-2

Chronology
- Preceded by: L'abbaye truquée, 1972
- Followed by: Tembo Tabou, 1974

Tora Torapa, written and drawn by Fournier, is the twenty-third album of the Spirou et Fantasio series, and the author's fourth, following the Spirou retirement of André Franquin. The story was initially serialised in Spirou magazine before its publication as a hardcover album in 1973.

== Story ==
In Tora Torapa, Spirou, Fantasio, The Count, Itoh Kata and Zorglub are all gathered at Champignac, when The Triangle appears again, this time to kidnap the scientist with a dubious past, Zorglub. The heroes manage to shoot a tracking device into their abducted friend, and eventually trace the movements of the kidnappers to the island of Tora Torapa, in the past the location of an old base used by the Zorglub network. There, Triangle number one Papa Pop (cf. Papa Doc), actually one of Spirou's arch-enemies Zantafio in disguise, is waiting with evil plans for world domination, but which he needs Zorglub to set into effect.

== Background ==
In this album, Ororéa is introduced.

== Trivia ==
Papa Pop's henchman Mac Ravash bears strong resemblance to comics writer and Spirou magazine editor Yvan Delporte.

The album features cameos of two other famous characters in Franco-Belgian comics (also featured in the Spirou magazine); at the airport, airline hostess Natacha is seen leading the boy Benoît Brisefer.
