= Spirou et les hommes-bulles =

Spirou et Fantasio #17 Spirou et les hommes-bulles
- Cover of the Belgian edition
- Date: 1964
- Series: Spirou et Fantasio
- Publisher: Dupuis

Creative team
- Writers: Franquin
- Artists: Franquin with Jean Roba

Original publication
- Published in: Le Parisien Libéré, Spirou magazine
- Issues: Unknown, #1272 - #1302
- Date of publication: Late 1958 - 1960; 1962 - 1963
- Language: French
- ISBN: 2-8001-0019-2

Chronology
- Preceded by: L'ombre du Z, 1962
- Followed by: QRN sur Bretzelburg, 1966

Spirou et les hommes-bulles (Spirou and the bubble-men), written and drawn by Franquin, is the seventeenth album of the Spirou et Fantasio series. The title story appeared sequentially (in black & white) in Le Parisien Libéré, and only the accompanying story Les petits formats was serialised in Spirou magazine as well, before both were published in a hardcover album in 1964.

== Story ==
In Spirou et les hommes-bulles, memories of Le repaire de la murène are invoked as John Helena, "the Moray", escapes from captivity, and Spirou, Fantasio and the Count suspect he is going after the gold that is still in the wreckage of Le Discret. A sudden trend of mini-submarine sabotage prompts the heroes to investigate, and the mystery becomes no more clear when Helena is discovered barely conscious, with gold, feebly warning of an attack by the "Bubble Men".

In Les Petits Formats, Marsupilami playfully exposes Fantasio's unused film, forcing him to go to Mr. Flashback's photo store to buy replacements. When Spirou next meets Fantasio, he is reduced to a palm-sized, paralyzed miniature statue, which causes Spirou to question his own sanity. In a setting of other similar incidents involving Mr. Flashback, and a suspicious collector of miniatures, Spirou is set on a desperate mission to somehow restore his friend back to normal.

== Background ==
Uniquely, Spirou et les hommes-bulles was never published in the Spirou magazine, but only in Le Parisien Libéré, uncoloured, and subsequently the later colour treatment of the two stories in this album is distinctly different from that of other Spirou albums. In comparison to its "prequel", Le repaire de la murène, hailed for its rich and atmospheric colour-use, it is criticized for falling short in this respect, as well as other, more typical, sequel disgruntlement.
