= Le voyageur du Mésozoïque =

Spirou et Fantasio #13 Le voyageur du Mésozoïque
- Cover of the Belgian edition
- Date: 1960
- Series: Spirou et Fantasio
- Publisher: Dupuis

Creative team
- Writers: Franquin with Greg
- Artists: Franquin with Jidéhem

Original publication
- Published in: Spirou magazine
- Issues: 1. 992 - #1018 #1086 - #1092
- Date of publication: 1957, 1959
- Language: French
- ISBN: 2-8001-0015-X

Chronology
- Preceded by: Le nid des Marsupilamis, 1960
- Followed by: Le prisonnier du Bouddha, 1960

Le voyageur du Mésozoïque, written by Franquin and Greg, drawn by Franquin with assistance by Jidéhem, is the thirteenth album of the Spirou et Fantasio series. The title story, and another, La Peur au bout du fil, were first serialised in Spirou magazine before the release in a hardcover album in 1960.

== Story ==
In The Traveller from the Mesozoic Era, The Count of Champignac sensationally returns from an Antarctic expedition with an intact dinosaur egg believed to be from the Jurassic period. Back in Champignac, the Count's closest professor friends arrive (along with unpleasant atomic science genius, Sprtschk) and proceed to plan ways to hatch the egg. With the interference of a free-roaming Marsupilami, and Fantasio acting out of sorts due to a cooling incident with an ice truck, control is soon lost, and the village of Champignac has a big dinosaur problem on its hands.

In the included story, La Peur au bout du fil, the Count continues to develop concoctions from mushrooms, but in a thoughtless moment he mistakes the toxic X4 residue from his cup of coffee, causing him to undergo big changes. His usually benevolent personality is inversed into pure evil, and Spirou, Fantasio and "the Biologist" must act to protect the village from this new, unlikely terrorist.

== Background ==
In his first Spirou adventure cameo, Gaston Lagaffe appears discreetly in two frames. Other character introductions include the Count's colleagues Schwarz, Black and Alexandre Specimen (usually called "Le Biologiste"). Another first appearance is that of Champignac town drunk, Célestin Dupilon.

As the bonus story La Peur au bout du fil credits long time Franquin collaborators Greg and Jidéhem with the usual "scenario" and "decors", but without mention of Franquin himself, it has been suggested that in this instance the collaborators have completed the story themselves. If this is the case, no apparent difference in line style can be discerned.
