= Starter (comics) =

Publication information
- Publisher: Dupuis
- Genre: Humor
- Publication date: 1952
- Main character(s): Starter; Pipette

Creative team
- Created by: André Franquin; Jidéhem
- Written by: Jidéhem
- Artist: Jidéhem

Starter is a Franco-Belgian comics series created by André Franquin (drawings) and Jidéhem (drawings and scripts) in Spirou.

== History ==
It originated in from a similarly titled periodical column about automobiles, written by Jacques Wauters in Spirou from 1952 on. In 1956 André Franquin started illustrating these columns and drew a little mechanic named Starter. One year later, his workload for the magazine had become massive, and he left the illustration work to Jidéhem, who had a notable talent for drawing automobiles. Jidéhem wrote and drew the column until 1978. Starter collected more than 700 episodes, full with beautiful technical drawings and technologically correct information.

The column was originally just text, with a few illustrations. Eventually it evolved into an adventure comic around Starter the mechanic. One of the side characters, Sophie, was introduced in 1964 and would eventually receive her own spin-off named Sophie.

Since, several books have been published with info and art from the Starter Columns.

== Albums ==
=== Original series ===
1. La Révolte des Autos (1959)
2. Histoire de l'Automobile (1960)
3. Starter Auto 1963 (1962)
4. Starter contre les Casseurs (1983)

=== Collection series ===
1. 60 Voitures des Années 60 (1990)
2. 60 Sportives de Starter (1992)
3. 60 Populaires de Starter (2013)
4. 60 Chroniques Insolites (2014)
5. 60 Voitures Historiques (2017)

== See also ==
- Marcinelle school

== Sources ==
- Jidéhem (1990). 60 voitures des années 60 (in French). La Sirène. ISBN 2884613633. JDM.
