= List of Spirou et Fantasio characters =

Some of the recurring characters in Spirou & Fantasio

The long-running Franco-Belgian comic series Spirou and Fantasio has a number of major and minor recurring characters.

== Main characters ==
=== Spirou ===
Spirou is the main character of this series.

=== Fantasio ===
Fantasio is introduced by Jijé in 1943 as faithful friend and comical sidekick, and appears in all published Spirou et Fantasio adventures afterwards.

== Recurring characters ==
=== Bring M. Backalive ===
Bring M. Backalive is an intrepid poacher who hunts in the Palombian jungles, obsessed with achieving his career's last remaining elusive triumph, to capture a live specimen Marsupilami. The character appeared in two Franquin stories, and later featured in the Marsupilami spin-off series.

==== Appearances ====
- 24. La cage (in Tembo Tabou) (Franquin)
- M0. Capturer un Marsupilami (in Capturez un Marsupilami) (Franquin)

=== The Count of Champignac ===
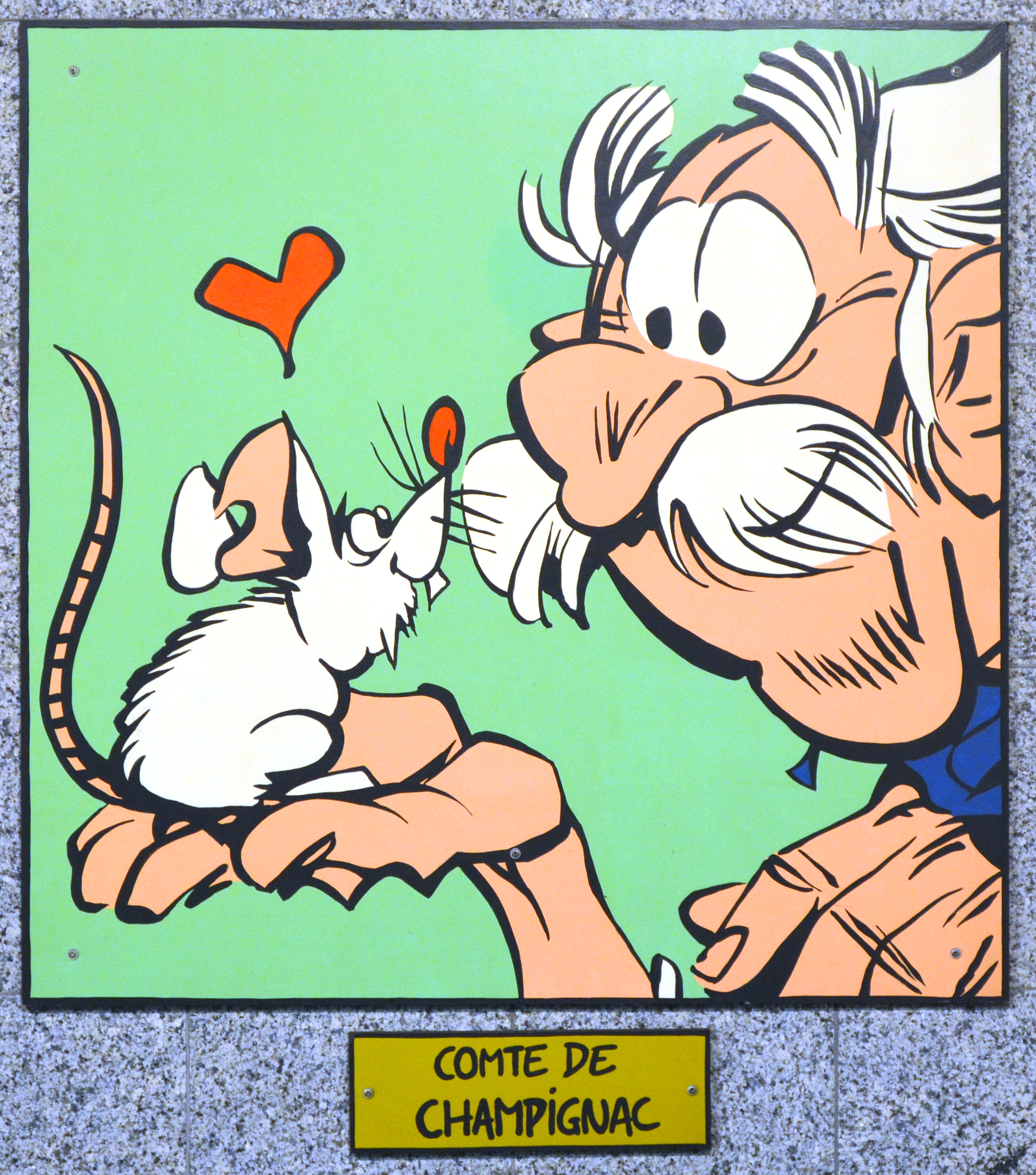
The Count of Champignac (Charleroi metro station)

Pacôme Hégésippe Adélard Ladislas de Champignac is an old, castle-dwelling aristocrat, genius of a scientist. He works in many fields such as chemistry, biology, physics, but most frequently he creates chemical substances from various mushrooms found in his castle's park. These experiments may have extraordinary effects such as softening metal, allowing the body to resist water pressure, speeding or reversing the body's ageing, giving people super-strength, or even turning people black. Also a skilled engineer, he has constructed numerous incredible machines such as individual dolphin-like submarines, and other handy gadgets. He is also proven to be a paleontologist, an astronomer and an astrophysicist.

Champignac is connected to several almost as eccentric scientists who frequently visit him at the castle, bringing new inventions and experiments that often bring about troublesome consequences. Due to his overall brilliance, he has several times been the victim of industrial espionage.

A wife of some time in his past has been mentioned, but no explanation of her absence was ever given. He has no children, but would eventually have a near-identical looking nephew, Aurélien de Champignac (L'horloger de la comète).

==== Appearances ====
- 2. Il y a un sorcier à Champignac
- 5. Les voleurs du Marsupilami
- 7. Le dictateur et le champignon
- 9. Le repaire de la murène
- 10. Les pirates du silence
- 13. Le voyageur du Mésozoïque
- 14. Le prisonnier du Bouddha
- 15. Z comme Zorglub
- 16. L'ombre du Z
- 17. Spirou et les hommes-bulles
- 19. Panade à Champignac
- HS4 Fantasio et le fantôme et 4 autres aventures

(incomplete)

=== Célestin Dupilon ===
Célestin Dupilon is a former veterinarian of Champignac-en-Cambrousse, who after retirement has assumed the role of town alcoholic. He paces about the town in a constant state of drunkenness, though he remains impeccably dressed. He was first introduced in Le voyageur du Mésozoïque (1957), by Franquin.

=== Cyanide ===
A gynoid, built by Louis LaGarne, but turned maverick and is bent on conquering humanity by any opportunity she can get. Created by Tome and Janry.

=== Don Vito Cortizone ===
Recurring maffia boss character, created by Tome and Janry.

=== Duplumier ===
This mild-mannered, timid official is the Mayor's assistant and right hand man. He was first introduced in Il y a un sorcier à Champignac (1951), by Franquin and Henri Gillain.

=== Gaston Lagaffe ===
Gaston Lagaffe first made a discrete appearance in Le voyageur du Mésozoïque, a slightly more noticeable appearance in Vacances sans histoires, and had an active role in La foire aux gangsters, before appearing in Franquin's two final Spirou adventures. He is better known as the hero of his own series, where Spirou and Fantasio appear regularly as well. Because Franquin kept the rights to this character, he hasn't appeared in any Spirou et Fantasio adventures since Franquin abandoned the series, but has had new books published since.

==== Appearances ====
- 11. Vacances sans histoires (in Le gorille a bonne mine) (Franquin)
- 12. La foire aux gangsters (in Le nid des Marsupilamis) (Franquin)
- 13. Le voyageur du Mésozoïque (Franquin)
- 19. Panade à Champignac and Bravo les Brothers. (Franquin)

=== John Helena ===
John Helena nicknamed "The Moray" is a criminal character encountered in Spirou's maritime adventures. Initially introduced in Le repaire de la murène as "the good captain" of the sunk vessel Le Discret, he is eventually revealed to be a hardened antagonist of the worst sort. During this adventure, he elaborates on his nickname, describing the moray as a fish with teeth that bothers no-one unless a fool comes by to disturb (i.e. Spirou). In his final appearance in the album "Virus" we find him after doing his time behind bars. He redeems himself by exposing an international gang of viral arms traders. At the end of the story he has started up a tourist organisation that shows people the abandoned base where the clandestine operation took place, a changed man who's earning his money the honest way.

==== Appearances ====
- 9. Le repaire de la murène (Franquin)
- 17. Spirou et les hommes-bulles (Franquin)
- 33. Virus (Tome & Janry)

=== Ibn-Mah-Zoud ===
Ibn-Mah-Zoud is a character who makes a strong impression, despite appearing in a single Spirou adventure: Vacances sans histoires. A wealthy sheikh, he suffers from colour blindness and is notoriously the world's worst driver. This is proved during the course of Vacances, once he has slipped away from his driver's guardianship and mistakes Spirou and Fantasio's blue Turbotraction:Turbot-Rhino I for his own red one. Surviving the catastrophic results of his joyride, he later proves himself to be a man of honour, replacing the destroyed car with a brand new prototype Turbot 2.

==== Appearances ====
- 11. Vacances sans histoires (in Le gorille a bonne mine) (Franquin)
- 50. Aux Sources du Z. (Cameo part, Morvan and Munuera)

=== Marsupilami ===
The Marsupilami is first encountered in the third act of Spirou et les héritiers, and from then on remained a near-constant character fixture in the following Franquin adventures. After this he featured in Fournier's first story, Le faiseur d'or under Franquin's supervision, and never appeared again, save for depictions as plush animal toys and in framed photos. This is because Franquin kept the rights to the character to himself, while the other characters belonged to publisher Dupuis. Since 1987, the specimen from Le nid des Marsupilamis stars in his own comics.

==== Appearances ====
- 4. Spirou et les héritiers
- 5. Les voleurs du Marsupilami
- 7. Le dictateur et le champignon
- 8. Touchez pas aux rouges-gorges (in La mauvaise tête)
- 9. Le repaire de la murène
- 10. Les pirates du silence
- 11. Le gorille a bonne mine and Vacances sans histoires
- 12. Le nid des Marsupilamis
- 13. Le voyageur du Mésozoïque
- 14. Le prisonnier du Bouddha
- 15. Z comme Zorglub
- 16. L'ombre du Z
- 17. Spirou et les hommes-bulles and Les petits formats
- 18. QRN sur Bretzelburg
- 19. Panade à Champignac and Bravo les Brothers
- 20. Le faiseur d'or (Fournier)
- 24. Tembo Tabou and La cage (in Capturez un Marsupilami)
- 25. La Colère du Marsupilami

=== Martin ===
Character created by Franquin in 1952 in Spirou et les Héritiers.

Motor racing driver, Martin is the first driver (and driving instructor) of the firm Turbot. With his teammate Roulebille, he participated in the construction and development of the Turbotraction, powered by a gas turbine, and the emblematic car of the series.

==== Appearances ====
- 4. Spirou et les héritiers (Franquin)
- 6. La Corne de rhinocéros (Franquin)

=== The Mayor of Champignac ===
Gustave Labarbe is usually referred to by the title of his office, the Mayor of Champignac. He is notable for his large ego, his pompous and nonsensical speeches, and his suspicion of all things from out-of-town, in particular Spirou and Fantasio themselves. A man who loves to hear himself speak, a simple conversation can turn into a speech in itself. He was first introduced in Il y a un sorcier à Champignac (1951).

==== Appearances ====
- 2. Il y a un sorcier à Champignac
- 7. Le dictateur et le champignon
- 13. Le voyageur du Mésozoïque
- 14. Le prisonnier du Bouddha
- 15. Z comme Zorglub
- 16. L'ombre du Z
- 17. Spirou et les hommes-bulles
- 19. Panade à Champignac

(incomplete)

=== Notary Mordicus ===
Maître Mordicus is the attorney in charge of fulfilling Fantasio's uncle's will, functioning as arbiter in the battle of skills and wits between Fantasio and Zantafio.

==== Appearances ====
- 4. Spirou et les héritiers (Franquin)

=== Le Petit Noël ===
Le Petit Noël (Little Noël) is a melancholic, dreamy boy who lives in Champignac-en-Cambrousse. He was created for the 1958 Spirou Christmas special issue. He would receive several small cameo appearances and become a good friend to Marsupilami during his stay near the village, the pair appearing in a few short stories together.

==== Appearances ====
- 14. Le prisonnier du bouddha (Franquin)
- 19. Panade à Champignac (Franquin)
- M0. Capturez un Marsupilami (several short stories) (Franquin)

=== Ororéa ===
Ororéa is a brave female reporter of Polynesian descent, first introduced in Tora Torapa. Fournier, who was not interested in using Seccotine, replaced her with this new female character, also a journalist, but more friendly with Fantasio. His infatuation with Ororea contrasts with his frequent exasperation at Seccotine.

==== Appearances ====
- 23. Tora Torapa (Fournier)
- 25. Le gri-gri du Niokolo-Koba (Fournier)
- 27. L'Ankou (Fournier)
- 30. Des haricots partout (Fournier) (Note: she appears only on the last/final page)

=== Roulebille ===
Character created by André Franquin in 1952 in Spirou et les Héritiers.
Roulebille is a racing driver at Turbot. With Martin, he participated in the construction and development of the Turbotraction, powered by a gas turbine, and the emblematic car of the series, which is at the center of the story La Corne de rhinocéros. He also makes a short appearance in Vacances sans histoires and appears in a few pages of Aux sources du Z, a story following the end of La Corne de rhinocéros.

==== Appearances ====
- 4. Spirou et les héritiers (Franquin)
- 6. La corne de rhinocéros (Franquin)
- 11. Vacances sans histoires (in Le gorille a bonne mine) (Franquin)

=== Seccotine ===
Seccotine is a strong-willed reporter, and was the first major female character in the series. She was created by André Franquin, and made her first appearance in La turbotraction, serialised in 1953 and published in the album La corne de rhinocéros in 1955.

==== Appearances ====
- 6. La corne de rhinocéros (Franquin)
- 7. Le dictateur et le champignon (Franquin)
- 11. Vacances sans histoires (in Le gorille a bonne mine) (Franquin)
- 12. Le nid des Marsupilamis (Franquin)
- HS4. Joyeuses Pâques, Papa! (Fantasio et le fantôme et 4 autres aventures) (Fournier)
- 34. Aventure en Australie (Tome & Janry)
- 38. La jeunesse de Spirou (Tome & Janry)
- 46. Machine qui rêve (Tome & Janry)
- 47. Paris-sous-Seine (Morvan & Munuera)

=== Le Snouffelaire ===
A strange animal from the future that has been suggested to look like the cross breed of a tapir and a vacuum cleaner. It has appetite to devour nearly anything, and by flatulent biology, is able to quickly pass out what it ate, encapsulated in bubbles.

==== Appearances ====
- 36. L'horloger de la comète (Tome & Janry)
- 37. Le réveil du Z (Tome & Janry)

=== Spip ===
Spip is one of the central characters of the series, Spirou's domesticated, courageous and sharp, grouchy pet squirrel. As his companion in all his adventures. Spip cannot talk, but his thoughts, often witty or sarcastic, are displayed to the reader, reflecting his usually grouchy mood. He's not pleased to frequently find himself in danger, but will be helpful in any situation as much as he can. Over the several authorship periods the character has evolved:

==== Rob-Vel and Jijé periods ====
Spip is saved by Spirou in Rob-Vel's and Jijé's first joint adventure L'Héritage de Bill Money (The Inheritance of Bill Money, 1938), and from then on he stands by his master's side. Under Rob-vel his presence is just visual, occasionally serving to gnaw ropes that bind his master, or adding to a comical detail. It is under Jijé's authorship he gains the capacity to speak through "thought balloons" (similar to Snoopy and Garfield). From this point he is given to state his opinion on any situation, often in a comical manner, and his communications appear to be understood.

==== Franquin period ====
Under Franquin's authorship, Spirou and Fantasio lose the ability to understand Spip, and when the Marsupilami joins the family, he also loses a great deal of attention but gains the perspective to feel ignored and underappreciated. In the shadow of his extraordinary fellow pet, he is less influential, although there are exceptions. In La corne de rhinoceros, he saves his friends from an angry elephant, earning him the title "king of creation". Near the end of this era, in QRN sur Bretzelburg, he is allowed to shine.

==== Fournier period ====
Fournier's Spip continues where Franquin's left off, his sarcasms becoming more frequent and self-pitying. He occasionally breaks the fourth wall, acknowledging that he is in a comic book and sometimes even complaining that Spirou and Fantasio are not exactly his idea of comic book heroes. Complaints aside, he was still an active (if often unwilling) participant in the stories, even saving the day on a few occasions, such as in L'abbaye truquée.

==== Tome & Janry period ====
In the beginning, Tome and Janry continued Spip much as Fournier had, letting him make biting remarks about whatever situation he was in, providing comedy relief and occasionally contributing to the plots. However, as the series evolved and grew more dramatic and mature, Spip's role was greatly reduced, his comments becoming less frequent until he stopped talking entirely. In later albums he's more or less a background character, still always by Spirou's side but seldom noticed by anyone. This was even parodied in Spirou à Moscou, where he after a kidnapping spends much of the story with a Band-Aid covering his mouth, and Spirou and Fantasio don't notice it.

=== Sprtschk ===
Sprtschk is an atomic scientist genius, whose mind is constantly fixed on physics formulas in pursuit of discovering the solution to create the ultimate bomb. Invited to The Count's castle for reason's unknown during the hatching of the Mesozoic egg, the Count appears to quite dislike this scientist, and he spends most of the time by himself to ponder his scientific riddle. Sprtschk's appearance in the Spirou adventures is very brief, though memorable and ironic. Having presumably just discovered the great goal of his career with sinister satisfaction, he is suddenly eaten, accidentally, by a vegetarian dinosaur. The Count feigns some guilt about his part in Sprtschk's death, but is more distraught when his trees are destroyed.

==== Appearances ====
- 13. Le voyageur du Mésozoïque (Franquin)

=== Marcelin Switch ===
Marcelin Switch appeared in QRN sur Bretzelburg.

Switch was a ham radio operator who got in touch with King Ladislas of Bretzelburg who was being kept a virtual prisoner in his palace by General Schmetterling. Ladislas wanted Switch to inform world opinion of his plight but the Bretzelburg secret police intercepted their communications and set out to kidnap Switch. By mistake however they captured Fantasio instead. Spirou resolved to go to Bretzelburg in order to rescue Fantasio and dragged the reluctant Switch along with him.

Switch was terrified from the start, and became even more so as they progressed through Bretzelburg, being convinced that they last hour had come at every minute. Disguised as window cleaners he and Spirou managed to sneak into the Royal palace during which a nervous Switch wrote out his will. He even fainted when he overheard an outburst by the intimidating General Schmetterling.

Switch, Spirou, Fantasio and the local rebel movement opposed to Schmetterling eventually succeeded in overthrowing him and restoring the King to his authority. Ladislas subsequently introduced reforms to overcome the economic plight caused by the General who had been fraudulently embezzling the state's coffers. The King even awarded Switch the Bretzelburg Medal of Courage!

Switch had a sister whose children enjoyed comics. In a breach of the fourth wall Switch got the characters of Spirou magazine mixed up with those of rival publication Tintin magazine.

==== Appearances ====
- 18. QRN sur Bretzelburg (Franquin)

=== Zantafio ===
Zantafio is a recurring antagonist in the series. He was created by Franquin and first appeared in Spirou et les héritiers (1952). Zantafio bears a strong resemblance to Fantasio, because they are cousins.

==== Appearances ====
- 4. Spirou et les héritiers (Franquin)
- 7. Le dictateur et le champignon (Franquin)
- 8. La mauvaise tête (Franquin)
- 16. L'ombre du Z (Franquin)
- 20. Le faiseur d'or (Fournier)
- 23. Tora Torapa (Fournier)
- 42. Spirou à Moscou (Tome & Janry)
- 48. L'homme qui ne voulait pas mourir (Morvan & Munuera)
- 55. La colère du Marsupilami (Yoann & Vehlmann)

=== Zorglub ===
Zorglub was created by Greg and Franquin, and first appeared in the story Z comme Zorglub serialised in 1959, published in the diptych albums Z comme Zorglub (1961) and L'ombre du Z (1962). Initially Zorglub's character was that of a sinister megalomaniac, mad scientist, but later becomes a reformed villain.

==== Appearances ====
- 15. Z comme Zorglub (Franquin)
- 16. L'ombre du Z (Franquin)
- 19. Panade à Champignac (Franquin)
- 20. Le faiseur d'or (Fournier)
- 23. Tora Torapa (Fournier)
- 37. Le réveil du Z (Tome & Janry)
- 50. Au source du Z (Morvan & Munuera)
- Les géants pétrifiés, but only for brief moments

=== Itoh Kata ===
Japanese magician created by Fournier, and used heavily in his stories, but largely forgotten by later authors, until Morvan and Munuera re-used him in Spirou à Tokyo.

== Sources ==
- Spirou official site: characters (in French)
- Franquin official site: characters (in French)

Footnotes
