= QRN sur Bretzelburg =

Spirou et Fantasio #18 QRN sur Bretzelburg
- Cover of the Belgian edition
- Date: 1966
- Series: Spirou et Fantasio
- Publisher: Dupuis

Creative team
- Writers: Franquin with Greg
- Artists: Franquin with Jidéhem

Original publication
- Published in: Le Journal de Spirou
- Issues: #1205 - #1237 and #1304 - #1340
- Date of publication: 1961 - 1963
- Language: French
- ISBN: 2-8001-0020-6

Chronology
- Preceded by: Spirou et les hommes-bulles, 1964
- Followed by: Panade à Champignac, 1969

QRN sur Bretzelburg (Eng. Lit., QRN over Bretzelburg), written by Franquin and Greg, drawn by Franquin with assistance by Jidéhem, is the eighteenth album of the Spirou et Fantasio series. The story was initially serialised in Spirou magazine under the name QRM sur Bretzelburg over an unusually long period (including a break in 1962), before a delayed hardcover album release in 1966.

== Story ==
In QRN over Bretzelburg, trouble stems from Fantasio's amazingly small transistor radio which gets wedged stuck inside the Marsupilami's nose. Apart from the grief and restlessness caused to all nearby by the unstoppable radio, the device jams the transmissions received by Marcelin Switch, a neighbour and radio enthusiast, who claims that this puts the life of King Ladislas of Bretzelburg in grave danger. While Spirou and Switch take Marsupilami to the clinic for nose surgery, Fantasio wearing a bathrobe and slippers in the wrong place at the wrong time is abducted by secret Bretzelpolizei who mistake him for Switch. Leaving the Marsupilami to recover in the hospital, Spirou, Spip and the nervous Switch travel to the dictatorial state of Bretzelburg, determined to rescue Fantasio, currently being tortured by the enthusiastic Dr.Kilkil. There, the team, reunited with the Marsupilami who has recovered uncannily fast and followed them across Europe, deal with a very unusual political situation...

== Background ==
Franquin has explained that he started QRN intending it to be another Zorglub story, but that this was vetoed by publisher Dupuis, who had seen enough of the character for the moment. Lost for ideas, Franquin called Greg to help come up with a new plot. Even with this help, Franquin was forced by an early bout of depression to abandon the story half-way through and return to it later. Franquin realised at that time that he would not carry on with Spirou et Fantasio for much longer.

In established comic book tradition, this album features apparently identical twin policemen similar to Thomson and Thompson from The Adventures of Tintin, this time in a stereotypically German incarnation. In one scene, the angry King tells them to take their hats off in his presence, assuring them that they run no risk of brain colds.

== Edits ==
When first published in Spirou magazine, the story was named QRM sur Bretzelburg. The title was changed from "QRM" to "QRN" between the serialisation and the book publication. In Q code used by radio services, QRN refers to interference due to atmospheric noise while QRM refers to interference originating from electrical devices.

The magazine also featured scenes which were edited out for the book edition:

- In the opening, Spirou runs around the house desperately switching off Fantasio's loud-playing radios. He even goes so far as mistaking the air conditioner, the toaster and the flash camera for radios.
- The Marsupilami causes chaos when he wanders around town with the miniature radio jammed in his nose. A commentary on a football game matches his moves as he gets around the various people in his way, faces a policeman (goalkeeper in the commentary) and a goal is struck when the pursuing Spirou and Fantasio collide with the officer.
- Later, in Bretzelburg, Kilikil forces Fantasio to walk around the jail's exercise yard with shoes that are far too small for him. (This takes place after the scene where Fantasio is shown banging on the cell door and complaining about having no shoes; the shoes can be seen when he is moved to another cell next to the kitchen.)

== Themes ==
In this story Franquin highlights the arms trade and how it encourages unnecessary conflict between nations in the pursuit of profit. He also satirises the effect on the local economy with people forced to pedal to move the bus due to fuel restrictions; the lack of food in the shops; and newspapers being worn as clothes. The weapons themselves are also shown as useless: oil barrels are stuck together to appear like rockets and grenades are made from food tins with the contents still inside. One might also in general see a de facto satire over life in then contemporary totalitarian states in especially Eastern Europe, like e.g. DDR. (Both stereotypical Germans and actual spoken German appear in the story.)
