= Seccotine (adhesive) =

Brand of fish glue

Seccotine is a brand of refined liquid fish glue first made in Ireland.

== Origins ==
Seccotine originated in Ireland and was first marketed and patented in 1894 by John Stevenson MA (1851-1931). The original manufacturer was the commercial printing company McCaw, Stevenson & Orr Limited of Belfast (founded 1876). In the early 1960s a new product, Seccotine No.2 PVA general-purpose adhesive, was introduced. Seccotine is a Trade Mark.

== History ==
The products and their registered trade marks for the UK and other clearly defined countries throughout the world were sold in 1968 to the English-based Royal Sovereign Group of Companies. Etablissements Martin, of Paris, which was already manufacturing in France under licence, acquired the trade marks for use in what were then the EEC countries, and certain other scheduled territories. Seccotine is a registered trade mark in UK.

== Etymology ==
It is one of the few trade names to have its entry and etymology recorded in the Oxford English Dictionary (1933 edition) where the name is explained as "apparently suggested by Italian secco, dry", though it is possible that the French sec (dry) may also have been an influence.

== Popular culture ==
The recurring character Seccotine of the Franco-Belgian comics series Spirou et Fantasio is named after the glue.

British popular ukuleleist George Formby sang about Frigid Air Fanny whose "teeth are not a grand set - she bought a second hand set - and stuck 'em in with seccotine" (1938).

Billy Bunter is glued into a chair with seccotine in The Magnet #100 (1910).

In the R. Austin Freeman novel As a Thief in the Night (1928) the use of seccotine rather than glue is used as a clue to identify a murderer.

In the C.S. Lewis novel That Hideous Strength (1945) a character is described as having a cigarette "seccotined" to his lip.

In the E. Nesbit novel The Story of the Amulet (1906) a broken saucer would never be the same again even if bits were joined "with Seccotine or the white of an egg."

In the Agatha Christie novels The Man in the Brown Suit (1924), a significant roll of film "...has evidently been stuck down with seccotine,..." and would need "the use of a tinopener". and Death on the Nile (1937), Poirot whilst searching a cabin.."He picked up a tube of Seccotine, fingered it absently for a minute or two, then said: 'Let us pass on.'"

Anthony Burgess, in his autobiography Little Wilson and Big God (1987) writes: "This [a broken Chinese vase] we all helped to mend laboriously with seccotine".

In the Aldous Huxley novel Eyeless in Gaza (1936) "This beastly stuff's drying on me. Like seccotine." when showered with dog's blood on a hot sunny day.

In William Trevor’s MAN Booker-shortlisted novel ‘The Story Of Lucy Gault’, Captain Everard Gault’s repairs to his Irish family home include squeezing Seccotine into the small perforations occurring in the lead of its slate roof, which is ‘effective for a while’.
