= La Corne de rhinocéros =

Sixth album of the Spirou et Fantasio series

Spirou et Fantasio #6 La corne de rhinocéros
- Cover of the Belgian edition
- Date: 1955
- Series: Spirou et Fantasio
- Publisher: Dupuis

Creative team
- Writers: Franquin
- Artists: Franquin

Original publication
- Published in: Spirou magazine
- Issues: 1. 764 - #787 #788 - #797
- Date of publication: 1952 - 1953
- Language: French
- ISBN: 2-8001-0008-7

Chronology
- Preceded by: Les voleurs du Marsupilami, 1954
- Followed by: Le dictateur et le champignon, 1956

La corne de rhinocéros, written and drawn by Franquin, is the sixth album of the Spirou et Fantasio series. The material was first serialised in Spirou magazine in two parts, Spirou et la Turbotraction and the sequel La corne de rhinocéros, and finally merged into one for the release of the hardcover album in 1955.

== Story ==
In The Rhino's Horn, Spirou and Fantasio rescue their friend the racecar driver Roulebille (from Spirou et les héritiers) who has been wounded by murderous thugs. Roulebille's employers, Turbot, have designed a car so spectacular that competitors will stop at nothing to steal its revolutionary plans. In order to find Roulebille's partner Martin and retrieve the car's blueprints, the two reluctantly team up with another journalist, an initially irritating but ultimately priceless young woman called Seccotine. The search for Martin takes them to several regions of Africa - complete with rather dated portrayals of the natives. After retrieving the missing blueprints from the titular body part, Spirou and Fantasio are given the very first prototype of the car, baptised Turbot-Rhino to celebrate their adventure.

== Background ==
Publisher Dupuis had Franquin retouch an early sequence when thugs chase Spirou and Fantasio in the department store, removing their guns.

The introduction of cheeky and quick-witted Seccotine into the Spirou universe was quite ahead of its time for Belgian comic books. She returns in several other stories.

The futuristic-looking Turbotraction:Turbot-Rhino I was not as far-fetched as it looked at the time. Franquin based it on actual prototypes depicted in scientific revues. A life-size model of it and other vehicles created later in the series was created for the World of Franquin exhibition in Paris and Brussels in 2006–2007.
