= Le dictateur et le champignon =

1956 Belgian comic book

Spirou et Fantasio #7 Le dictateur et le champignon
- Cover of the Belgian edition
- Date: 1956
- Series: Spirou et Fantasio
- Publisher: Dupuis

Creative team
- Writers: Franquin; Maurice Rosy, idea
- Artists: Franquin

Original publication
- Published in: Spirou magazine
- Issues: 1. 801 - #838
- Date of publication: 1953 - 1954
- Language: French
- ISBN: 2-8001-0009-5

Chronology
- Preceded by: La corne de rhinocéros, 1955
- Followed by: La mauvaise tête, 1957

Le dictateur et le champignon, written and drawn by Franquin, is the seventh album of the Spirou et Fantasio series. After serial publication in Spirou magazine, the story was released as a hardcover album in 1956.

== Story ==
When the Marsupilami causes chaos all over Champinac on the Sticks, Spirou and Fantasio decide that it is time to take him back to his home in the Palombian jungles. After an eventful journey by cruise ship, they find that Fantasio's shady cousin Zantafio has reinvented himself as General Zantas and become the country's ruthless and chariasmatic dictator. The now power-mad Zantafio, intent on invading a neighbouring country, offers them top positions in his army. When they indignantly refuse, Zantafio throws them in jail. The pair decide to feign a change of heart, and plan to foil the invasion using one of The Count of Champignac's curious inventions...

== Background ==
Two characters introduced in previous stories return for the first time in this one: the resourceful Seccotine, and the shifty Zantafio who was last seen repenting his scoundrel ways at the conclusion of Spirou et les héritiers, but later evolved into a worse villain. Franquin expressed regrets at twisting the character back and forth like this, but later did the same again with Zorglub.

One of Champignac's most memorable mushroom-based inventions, the "Métomol", a powerful metal-softening gas, is introduced in this story and is later used again in several others.

The sequence where Spirou and Fantasio melt a whole army's gear is an early, still quite gentle, expression of Franquin's anti-militarism, which he would let loose much more ferociously in Gaston Lagaffe and Idées noires.
