= Sophie (comics) =

Belgian comic book series

- The series main character, 1970 illustration
- Author(s): Jidéhem, Vicq
- Current status/schedule: Terminated.
- Launch date: 1965
- End date: 1994
- Syndicate(s): Dupuis
- Genre(s): Humor comics, Adventure comics

Sophie is a Belgian comics series, originally written by Vicq and co-written and drawn by Jidéhem. It follows the adventures of a young girl and was prepublished in Spirou between 1965 and 1994. The series was notable for being the first comic strip series in Spirou with a female character as its leading character.

== History ==
Sophie was originally a side character in Jidéhem's Starter, which was a column dedicated to automobiles in Spirou. Starter featured the adventures of a young mechanic, Starter, and a young female companion named Sophie. When readers showed more interest in Sophie than in Starter she received her own spin-off.

== Concept ==
Sophie is a young black-haired, pig-tailed girl who is the daughter of electrotechnician Mr. Karapolie. She was named after Jidéhem's own daughter. They both live in a villa in a quiet neighborhood outside the city, where they are aided by a butler, Joseph. Sophie has three friends, Starter and Pipette, who work as mechanics and Petit Bernard, a little boy who is two years younger than her and far more cowardly. Pipette furthermore owns a black car, Zoë, with a sentient mind. Many storylines revolve around criminals who want to steal the inventions of Sophie's father.

== Albums ==
- L' Oeuf de Karamazout (1968)
- La Bulle de Silence (1968)
- Les Bonheurs de Sophie (1st series) (1969)
- Qui fait peur à Zoè? (1970)
- Sophie et le Rayon Kâ (1971)
- La Maison d'en face (1972)
- Sophie et le Cube qui parle (1972)
- Les Bonheurs de Sophie (2nd series) (1973)
- La Tiare de Matlotl Halatomal (1974)
- Sophie et le Douanier Rousseau (1976)
- Cette Sacrée Sophie (1977)
- Les Quatre Saisons (1978)
- Sophie et l'Inspecteur Céleste (1979)
- Sophie et Donald Mac Donald (1980)
- Rétro Sophie (1981)
- Sophie et Cie (1984)
- Don Giovanni (1990)
- L'Odyssée du U 522 (1991)
- Le Tombeau des Glyphes (1995)

== Here Comes Sophie ==
A number of posters exist on the Web, alleging the existence of an animated movie based on the comic. The movie was speculated to be a piece of lost media, but was eventually found to be a hoax.

== See also ==
- Marcinelle school
