= Blondin et Cirage =

Belgian comic series

- The title characters on the cover of the fourth album (1947)
- Author: Jijé
- Illustrator: Jijé
- Current status/schedule: Discontinued
- Launch date: 1939
- End date: 1963
- Publisher: Dupuis
- Genre(s): Humor comics, Adventure comics

Blondin et Cirage (Blondin and Cirage, literally Blondy and Shoe polish) is a Belgian humoristic adventure comic strip by Jijé created in 1939 for the Catholic children's magazine Petits Belges. The comic was also published in its Flemish counterpart Zonneland, initially under the name Wietje en Krol, later as Blondie en Blinkie. It stars two boys, Blondin – who is white – and Cirage – who is black.

== Concept ==
Blondin is a white, blond-haired boy who functions as the straight man of the comic. Cirage is a black boy who functions as his comedic sidekick, yet is equally clever. They go on several adventures which bring them to the United States, Africa and Mexico.

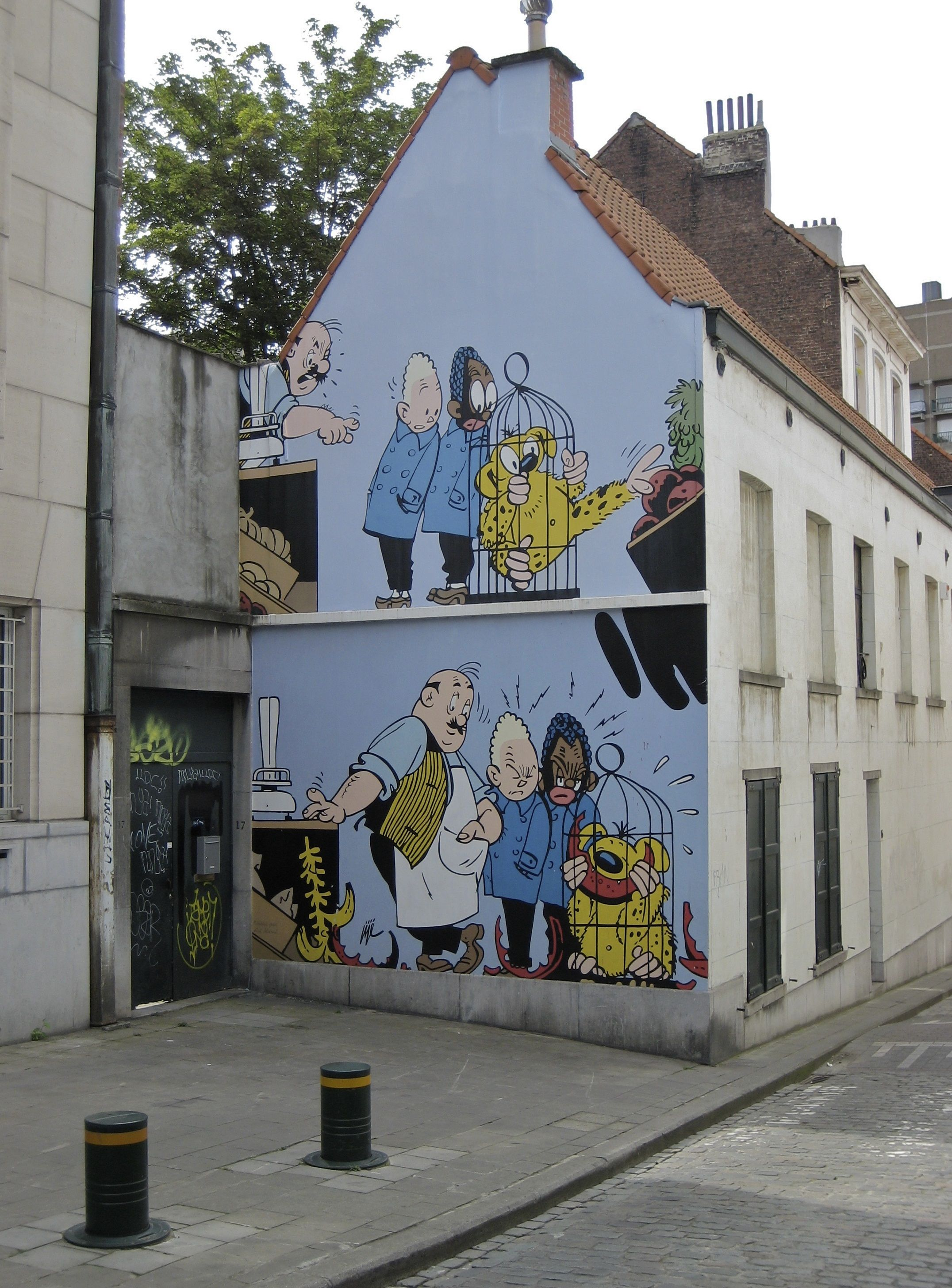
Blondin and Cirage depicted as a wall painting in Brussels, Belgium

== History ==
Blondin et Cirage made their debut in the 29th issue of Petits Belges in 1939. They had three adventures during World War II, with Cirage being absent in the last one due to the racial policies of the Nazi occupation. After World War II they reappeared in Spirou where their adventures ran from 1947 until 1963.

Blondin et Cirage is notable for featuring the first black titular character in a Belgian comic strip. While both characters have a somewhat stereotypical appearance, the Cirage character is otherwise far more clever and sympathetic than most portrayals of black people in Western media at that time.

== Albums ==
- 1. Blondin et Cirage en Amérique (Blondin and Cirage in America) (1939)
- 2. Blondin et Cirage contre les gangsters (Blondin and Cirage against the gangsters) (1940–1941)
- 3. Jeunes Ailes (Young Wings) (1942)
- 4. Les Nouvelles Aventures de Blondin et Cirage (The New Adventures of Blondin and Cirage) (1947)
- 5. Blondin et Cirage au Mexique (Blondin et Cirage in Mexico) (1951)
- 6. Le Nègre Blanc (The White Negro) (1951)
- 7. Kamiliola (Kamiliola) (1952)
- 8. Silence! On Tourne (Silence! We're filming) (1953)
- 9. Blondin et Cirage découvrent les soucoupes volantes (Blondin and Cirage discover flying saucers) (1954)
- 10. Le Merveilleux Noël de Blondin et Cirage (The Happy Christmas of Blondin and Cirage) (1963)

== In popular culture ==
In 1998 the characters were commemorated as a comic book wall painting designed by Georgios Oreopoulos and Daniel Vandegeerde, part of the Brussels' Comic Book Route. It can be visited in the Rue Capucine/Capucijnstraat in Brussels.

== See also ==
- Belgian comics
- Brussels' Comic Book Route
- Franco-Belgian comics
