= Les voleurs du Marsupilami =

Spirou et Fantasio #5 Les voleurs du Marsupilami
- Cover of the Belgian edition
- Date: 1954
- Series: Spirou et Fantasio
- Publisher: Dupuis

Creative team
- Writers: Franquin; Jo Almo, idea
- Artists: Franquin

Original publication
- Published in: Spirou magazine
- Issues: 1. 729 - #761
- Date of publication: 1952
- Language: French
- ISBN: 2-8001-0007-9

Chronology
- Preceded by: Spirou et les héritiers, 1952
- Followed by: La corne de rhinocéros, 1955

Les voleurs du Marsupilami, published in English as The Marsupilami Thieves, is the fifth album of the Spirou et Fantasio series, written and drawn by Franquin. The story is a continuation from where the previous album, Spirou et les héritiers, left off. After serial publication in Spirou magazine, the story was released as a complete hardcover album in 1954.

== Story ==
In The Marsupilami's Thieves, Spirou and Fantasio regret giving the magnificent animal they brought back from the Palombian jungle, the Marsupilami, to a zoo, and decide to free the animal again and return it to its original home. This plan fails because someone else beats them to the abduction, and another quest to find the Marsupilami begins. This journey brings them to the city of Magnana, and the fiendish Circus Zabaglione.

== Background ==
As a direct (and slightly less fantastic) sequel to the previous album, Les Voleurs contain several memorable episodes, including the intermezzo at the border station, and Spirou and Fantasio's circus disguise act as "Cam & Leon", with some help from the science of The Count of Champignac.

Football player Valentin Mollet, introduced in this story, is another "shifting" character in Spirou et Fantasio. Initially a villain - he steals the Marsupilami for money to support his family - he repays Spirou et Fantasio for giving him a second chance and ends up saving the day.

Jo Almo, a pseudonym for Geo Salmon, is credited for idea work.
