= L'ombre du Z =

Spirou et Fantasio #16 L'ombre du Z
- Cover of the Belgian edition
- Date: 1962
- Series: Spirou et Fantasio
- Publisher: Dupuis

Creative team
- Writers: Franquin with Greg
- Artists: Franquin with Jidéhem

Original publication
- Published in: Spirou magazine
- Issues: 1. 1140 - #1183
- Date of publication: 1960
- Language: French
- ISBN: 2-8001-0018-4

Translation
- Publisher: Spirou and Fantasio # 16; Shadow of Z

Chronology
- Preceded by: Z comme Zorglub, 1961
- Followed by: Spirou et les hommes-bulles, 1964

L'ombre du Z, written and drawn by Franquin with Greg and Jidéhem, is the sixteenth album of the Spirou et Fantasio series, and the second part of Franquin's Zorglub diptych. The story was initially serialised in Spirou magazine, before its release as a hardcover album in 1962.

== Story ==
As The Shadow of Z, begins, Spirou, Fantasio and the Count of Champignac return from Zorgland, to find the population of Champignac have been paralyzed by a "zorglman" they left behind sedated, the abducted policeman Jérôme, who awoke and went on a stunning spree. After the ordeal of pacifying the rogue zorglman and restoring the people of Champignac to normal, time passes until Zorglub's sinister schemes again become evident. Without remorse (despite the conscience-burdened act during the conclusion of Z comme Zorglub) Zorglub continues to work for world domination from Palombia, with increased ambition, and allied with Fantasio's evil nemesis cousin Zantafio.
