= Le repaire de la murène =

Ninth album of the Spirou et Fantasio series

Spirou et Fantasio #9 Le repaire de la murène
- Cover of the Belgian edition
- Date: 1957
- Series: Spirou et Fantasio
- Publisher: Dupuis

Creative team
- Writers: Franquin
- Artists: Franquin

Original publication
- Published in: Spirou magazine
- Issues: 1. 871 - #904
- Date of publication: 1954 - 1955
- Language: French
- ISBN: 2-8001-0011-7

Chronology
- Preceded by: La mauvaise tête, 1957
- Followed by: Les pirates du silence, 1958

Le repaire de la murène, written and drawn by Franquin, is the ninth album of the Spirou et Fantasio series, adding underwater adventure to the Spirou universe. After serial publication in Spirou magazine, it was released as a complete hardcover album in 1957.

== Story ==
In The Moray's Keep, shipping magnate Xénophon Hamadryas offers a $6000 prize to the makers of a submarine innovation in order to find his sunken ship Le Discret off the French Mediterranean coast. The Count of Champignac's mini-sub invention is so spectacular that the competition must resort to sabotage. A chain of secrets need to be exposed while the maritime criminal John "the Moray" Helena lurks in the deep.

== Background ==
The inventions of the Count of Champignac are central to this story as the X4 mushroom elixir that increases brain activity comes into play, resulting in the "Véhicule sous-marin individuel".

An old Fantasio invention, the "Fantacopter", makes a reappearance.

A new discovery in the biology of Marsupilami is revealed, as he demonstrates amphibious qualities.
