= Zantafio =

Zantafio (left) as young and unsympathetic in 1952

Zantafio is a recurring fictional antagonist in the Spirou et Fantasio comic book series. He was created by André Franquin and first appeared in Spirou et les héritiers (1952). Zantafio bears a strong resemblance to Fantasio, because they are cousins. In Le dictateur et le champignon (1953), he is a South-American dictator of the fictional country Palombia.

== Character evolution ==
Zantafio first appears at an inheritance contest, arrogant and in debt. He and Fantasio are the only heirs, and he who wins three challenges wins the inheritance. After continually employing dirty tactics and still losing, Zantafio admits defeat, claiming to see the errors of his cheating ways, and feels guilty about it. The cousins part on good terms while searching for the Marsupilami in the Palombian rainforest.

Yet, Zantafio, under the alias of General Zantas, returns as the dictator of the country, much to the surprise of Spirou and Fantasio. He offers Spirou and Fantasio a place within his army, but they are repulsed by Zantafio's change in personality. No longer friendly, Zantafio becomes merciless, brutal, and drunk on power. Spirou and Fantasio, with the inventions of the Count of Champignac, initiate a revolt in Palombia. During the revolution, Zantafio is ousted from power and disappears into the jungle.

Zantafio seizes power

Zantafio later strikes back at his cousin by framing him for thievery. He employs special henchmen to impersonate him and therefore disgrace him, but Spirou manages to foil his plans. Zantafio continues to return several times as the nemesis antagonist, exploring many variants of crime. He even becomes Zorglub's second-in-command and then tries to replace him to gain power in L'ombre du Z (1956).

When Fournier took over the series, the criminal organisation known as the Triangle became the main recurring antagonist focus of the series. In Tora Torapa (1973), Zantafio returns as leader of the Triangle.

After Fournier left the series, Zantafio disappeared for a long time as well: the new creative team of Broca & Cauvin created new villains for their short run and their successors Tome & Janry started out their run creating own villains well. Their La jeunesse de Spirou included a story from the spin-off series Le Petit Spirou, which showed Zantafio as a child (but still wearing a moustache), but this story was done for comedic purposes. In Spirou à Moscou (1990), Zantafio returns, as the "White Prince of the Russian Mafia", attempting to become the new Tsar of Russia. He uses the alias, as well as the anagram, "Tanaziof".

When Morvan and Munuera took over as Spirou creative team, Zantafio returned in their second issue, L'homme qui ne voulait pas mourir (2005).

=== Appearances ===
- 4. Spirou et les héritiers (Franquin)
- 7. Le dictateur et le champignon (Franquin)
- 8. La mauvaise tête (Franquin)
- 16. L'ombre du Z (Franquin)
- 20. Le faiseur d'or (Fournier)
- 23. Tora Torapa (Fournier)
- 42. Spirou à Moscou (Tome & Janry)
- 48. L'homme qui ne voulait pas mourir (Morvan & Munuera)
- 55. La colère du Marsupilami (Yoann & Vehlman)
