= Marsu Productions =

- Company type: Subsidiary
- Industry: Entertainment
- Founded: 1987; 39 years ago
- Founder: Jean-François Moyersoen
- Headquarters: Monaco
- Products: Comics; Television series
- Brands: Marsupilami; Gaston Lagaffe; Natacha
- Parent: Dupuis (2013–present)
- Website: www.marsuproductions.com

Marsu Productions is a comics publishing house which mainly manages the Franco-Belgian comics characters and copyright concerns of the comics universe of André Franquin (Marsupilami, Gaston Lagaffe, Le Petit Noël, Les Monstres). The company, based in Monaco, also manages the rights of François Walthéry's Natacha and Le P'tit bout d'chique, and Léonid et Spoutnika by Yann and Philippe Bercovici among others.

The name 'Marsu' refers to one Franquin's Marsupilami character.

== History ==
Franquin, who had previously worked for the publishing house Dupuis, decided to leave his company and start his own in 1987. He brought along his own creations Marsupilami and Gaston Lagaffe, and the company soon started launching a series of Marsupilami albums continuing publication of the character Franquin had created in 1952, while working on the series Spirou et Fantasio for the Franco-Belgian comics magazine Spirou. Since Spirou and Fantasio were not Franquin's own creations, the publisher Dupuis retained the rights to the characters. Several of the characters under Marsu management are however closely associated with this series, and Marsupilami, Gaston Lagaffe, and Le Petit Noël are to varying degrees spin-off series.

Marsu Productions S.A.M. was created in 1987 in Monaco by the financial advisor Jean-François Moyersoen.

The first publication La Queue du Marsupilami in 1987 with art by Batem and stories by Greg, launched its new series, which by 2007 had passed 20 issues. Natacha made the switch from Dupuis to Marsu in 1989 with the album Cauchemirage, and ended serial production in Spirou. In 1992, Franquin also added worldwide rights of Gaston Lagaffe to Marsu, a series he also created for Spirou. In 1992, Marsu Productions worked with Disney to create 25 six-minute cartoons of the Marsupilami, but Franquin did not like Disney's adaptation so the project was dropped.

In 1999, Gaston Lagaffe topped comics sales in France. The Marsupilami album numbered 0, Capturez un Marsupilami, the only album featuring Franquin's seminal stories, was published in 2002, sometime after Franquin's death in 1997.

In 2013, the publisher Dupuis, who was already a minority shareholder, bought Marsu Productions and the right of its 150 published comics.
