= La mauvaise tête =

Spirou et Fantasio #8 La mauvaise tête
- Cover of the Belgian edition
- Date: 1957
- Series: Spirou et Fantasio
- Publisher: Dupuis

Creative team
- Writers: Franquin
- Artists: Franquin

Original publication
- Published in: Spirou magazine
- Issues: 1. 840 - #869
- Date of publication: 1954
- Language: French
- ISBN: 2-8001-0010-9

Chronology
- Preceded by: Le dictateur et le champignon, 1956
- Followed by: Le repaire de la murène, 1957

La mauvaise tête, written and drawn by Franquin, is the eighth album in the Spirou et Fantasio series. After serial publication in Spirou magazine the complete story was published, along with the Marsupilami short story Touchez pas aux rouges-gorges, in a hardcover album in 1957.

== Story ==
Swedish issue, The False Face

In A Head for Crime, due to a few missing passport photos, Fantasio finds himself a victim of a conspiracy to frame him as the thief of an invaluable Egyptian gold mask. Appearing completely guilty, he is forced to flee from the law, attempting escape from the city disguised as a competing bicyclist in the 6 day mountain endurance race Tour de Midiville, leaving Spirou alone with the tough task of exposing the real villains, and clearing Fantasio's name.

The accompanying short story, Don't Touch the Robins, describes the Marsupilami's close relationship with little birds, while vacationing in The Count of Champignac's castle park (presumably during the events of the Marsupilami-free story La mauvaise tête).

== Background ==
This classic tale of an innocent wrongly condemned, is presented in the tight-paced and "cinematic" storytelling that is typical of Franquin's strongest work. The combination of energetic line style and noir tension sets a tone that, to some followers, marks the peak of the Spirou adventures.
