= Champignac =

Fictional village in Belgium

Champignac, or specifically Champignac-en-Cambrousse, is a fictional village frequently featured in the adventures of Spirou et Fantasio by André Franquin and the successive authors. The initial idea of Champignac is attributed to Henri Gillain. The village was introduced in the adventure Il y a un sorcier à Champignac, first published in Spirou magazine in 1950.

The Count's estate in Champignac-en-Cambrousse

== Features ==
The village is placed in a rural region of Belgium (despite the name's suffix suggesting a location in the south of France), and is known for its prolific occurrence of mushrooms. Mainly a farming community, the commune is home to several central and more obscure characters of the Spirou adventures, most notably the Count of Champignac whose château is a prominent fixture of the region. The Mayor of Champignac, Gustave Labarbe, is also a public presence, in statues, billboards and in person. The Mayor's assistant, Duplumier is often seen on his bicycle, and the former pharmacist and town drunk, Dupilon, is frequently visible. Other inhabitants from the wide gallery of secondary characters are Noël, a little boy and friend of the Marsupilami, Jérôme the policeman, Jules the who runs the local garage and filling station, A. Tachetoux (French for "Stains-everything") the bookseller, and Eugene the grocer.

== Role ==
During the course of the Spirou stories that have taken place in Champignac, the village population as a whole has been exploited as a "victim character" in several of the plots. The ways in which the population has been victimized are:

- Il y a un sorcier à Champignac: confused guinea pigs in the Count's mushroom experiments, they turn into an angry lynch-mob.
- Le voyageur du Mésozoïque: the village is devastated by a dinosaur.
- Z comme Zorglub: the villagers are mass-hypnotized into angry, destructive vandals.
- L'ombre du Z: the entire population is paralyzed by Zorglub's zorglonde stunning-ray.
- Qui arrêtera Cyanure?: the villagers are being mind-controlled.
- Le Rayon noir: the predominantly white population is turned black.
