= Spirou et les héritiers =

Fourth album of the Spirou & Fantasio series by Franquin

Spirou et Fantasio #4 Spirou et les héritiers
- Cover of the Belgian edition
- Date: 1952
- Series: Spirou et Fantasio
- Publisher: Dupuis

Creative team
- Writers: Franquin
- Artists: Franquin

Original publication
- Published in: Spirou magazine
- Issues: 1. 693 - #726
- Date of publication: 1951 - 1952
- Language: French
- ISBN: 2-8001-0006-0

Chronology
- Preceded by: Les chapeaux noirs, 1952
- Followed by: Les voleurs du Marsupilami, 1954

Spirou et les héritiers, written and drawn by Franquin, is the fourth album of the Spirou et Fantasio series, and a great leap in the expansion of the Spirou universe. After serial publication in Spirou magazine, it was released as a complete hardcover album in 1952.

== Story ==
In Spirou and the Heirs, Fantasio is told he must compete against his cousin Zantafio to inherit from a long-absent uncle. The deceased has devised three trials for the two men: creating an original and useful invention, achieving a top 6 Grand Prix race position, and finally capturing a mysterious animal, the Marsupilami in the Palombian jungle. The dishonest Zantafio uses extreme tactics to win, and the two cousins are tied after the second task.

The third task proves the hardest, as the creature's prodigious reflexes and abilities make it impossible to capture, until it accidentally drinks a gallon of heating oil. Spirou and Fantasio nurse it and put it in a cage. On their way back, they are ambushed by hostile natives, but Zantafio, who has seen the errors of his ways and decided to drop out of the race, rescues them. Back home, Fantasio is declared the winner but learns that his impoverished uncle devised the race because he had nothing to leave his young relatives. The inheritance is the lessons in life learnt in the course of the competition. Fantasio declares himself satisfied.

== Background ==
This album marks the first ever appearance (originally in Spirou issue #720, published January 31, 1952) of the Marsupilami. The character appeared in most subsequent Spiriou et Fantasio stories by Franquin before getting its own series. Franquin told that the ideas leading to its creation stem from the period Franquin lived in Jijé's household with Will and Morris, from a joke concerning a very active tramway conductor with too many duties, in need of a long, agile rat's tail to help with the tasks, and how this core idea allowed the Marsupilami character to grow. Another influence was Eugene the Jeep ("Pilou Pilou" in French) a character from Popeye which Franquin was fond of. He later expressed regret at having bound the Marsupilami species to a South American jungle, considering marsupials are found in Australia.

With Les Héritiers, Franquin also reveals his passion for automobile sports.
