= Jijé =

Belgian comics artist (1914–1980)

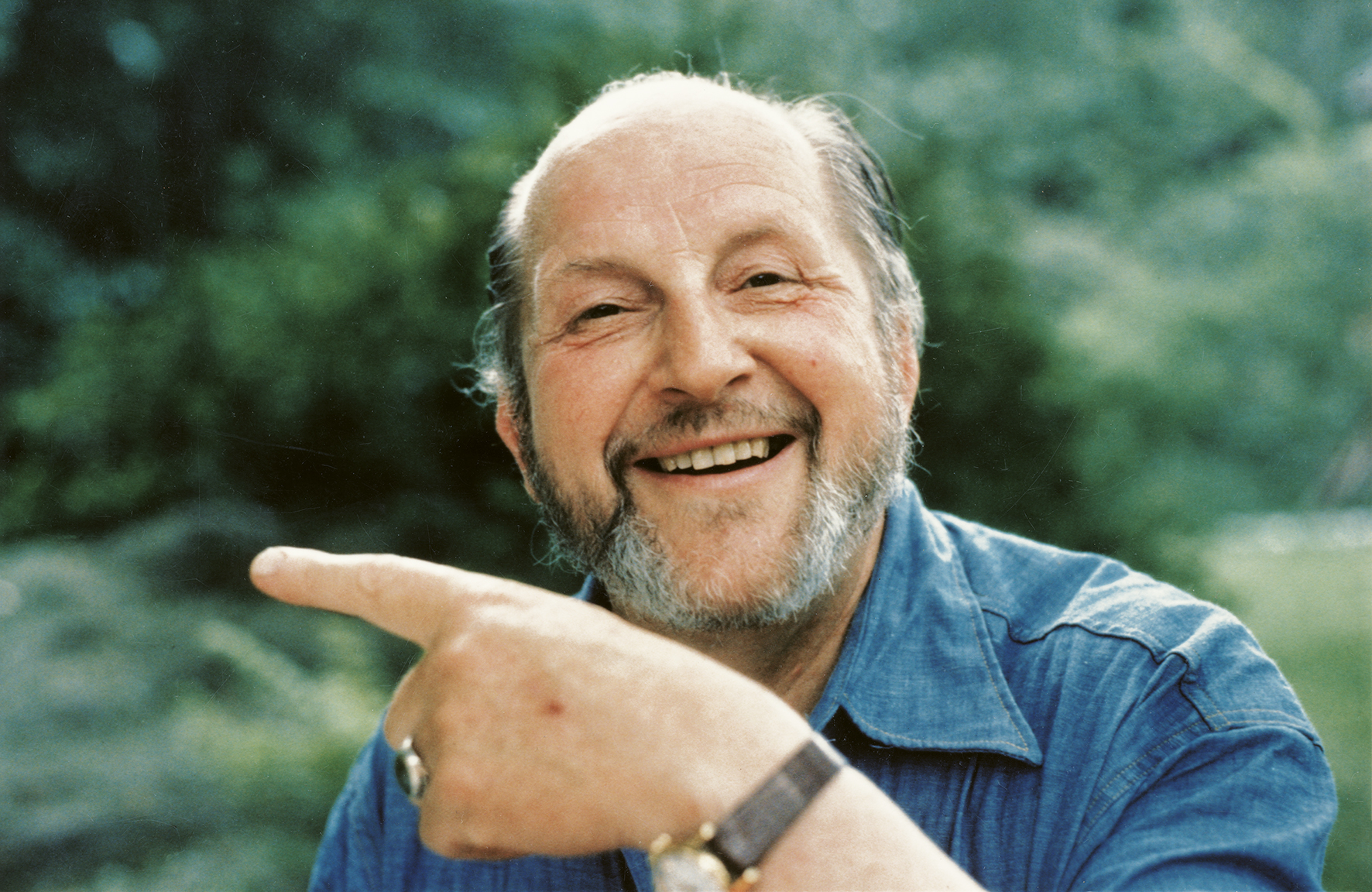
- Jijé in 1975
- Born: Joseph Gillain; 13 January 1914 Gedinne, Belgium
- Died: 19 June 1980 (aged 66) Versailles, France
- Notable works: Spirou et Fantasio; Blondin et Cirage; Jean Valhardi; Jerry Spring
- Awards: Full list

Signature
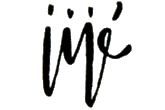

Joseph Gillain (French: [ʒilɛ̃]), better known by his pen name Jijé ([ʒiʒe]; 13 January 1914 – 19 June 1980) was a Belgian comics artist, best known for being a seminal artist on the Spirou et Fantasio strip (and for having introduced the Fantasio character) and the creator of one of the first major European western strips, Jerry Spring.

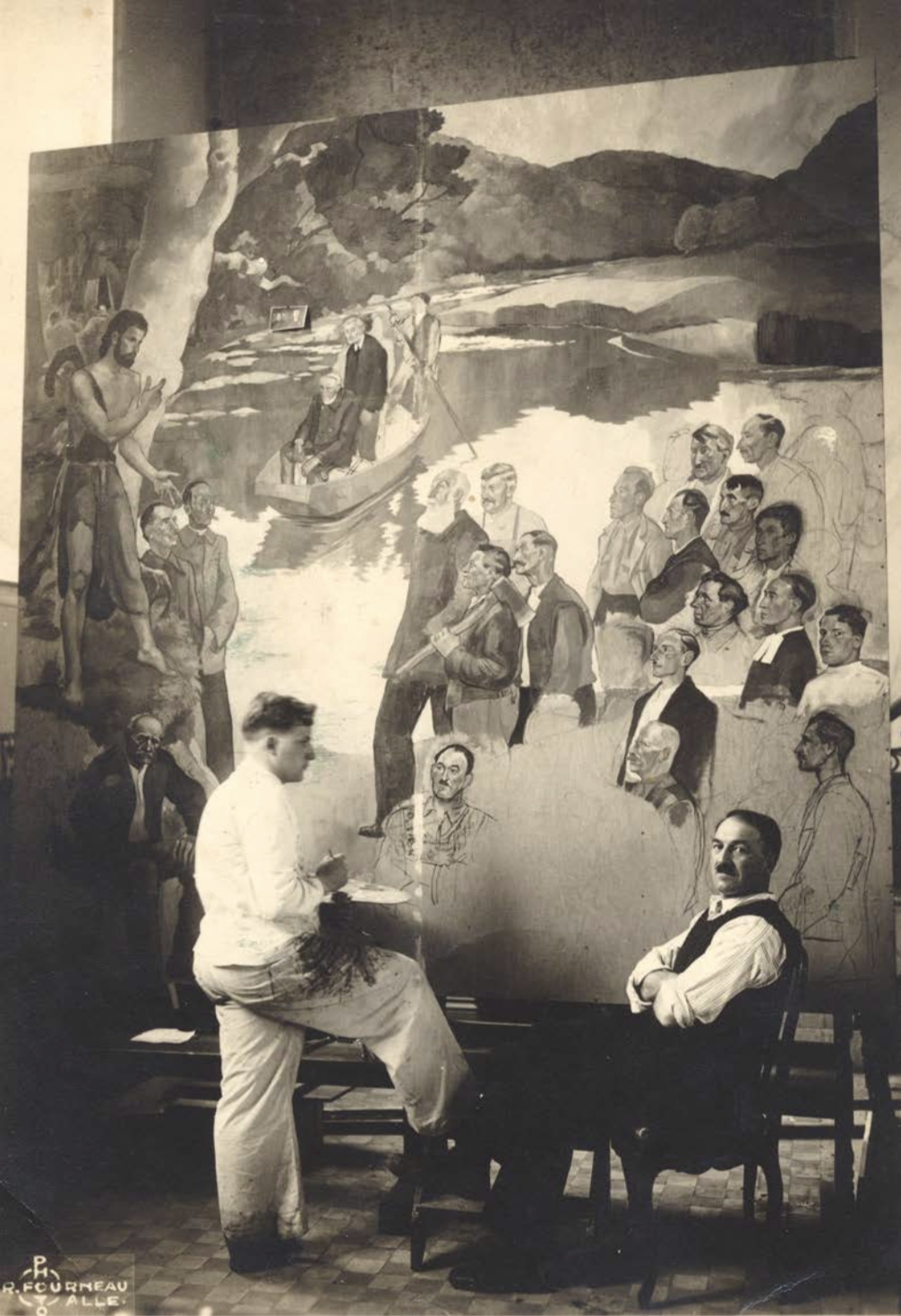
Corbion, Joseph Gillain peint La prédication de saint Jean- Baptiste, 1938

== Biography ==
Blondin, Cirage, Prof. Labarbousse and guest star "Marsupilami Africanis" in Les soucoupes volantes (1954)

Born Joseph Gillain in Gedinne, Namur, he completed various art studies (woodcraft, goldsmithing, drawing and painting) at the abbey of Maredsous. In 1936, he created his first comics character, Jojo in the catholic newspaper Le Croisé. Jojo was strongly inspired by The Adventures of Tintin, but Jijé gradually developed his own style. Soon a second series followed, Blondin et Cirage, for the catholic youth magazine Petits Belges. Jijé also produced many illustrations for various Walloon magazines (Les Cahiers wallons).

In 1936, he began work on about ten frescoes painted in the transept, the vault, and the altar of the church in Corbion (Bouillon, Belgium). These later paintings echoed those painted in the rood screen in 1933 and naturally reflected the veneration of the church's patron saint. These frescoes have now disappeared, having been covered over in the early 1970s.

In 1938, he painted a three-by-three-meter canvas in the church of Corbion (Bouillon, Belgium), depicting thirty-five villagers listening to Saint John the Baptist preach on the banks of the Semois River. He portrays himself in the painting, palette in hand. This painting can still be seen in the church today.

In 1939, he started to work for the new Spirou magazine, where he would produce the largest part of his oeuvre and with whom he would remain associated with until the end of his life. Because the magazine could not receive foreign comic strip material during the war, as the main local artist, he drew most of the comics during that period. He took over the main series, Spirou, from the Frenchman Rob-Vel: he added the sidekick Fantasio to the lone hero Spirou in order to add some comic relief in the series. He then created his own series, Jean Valhardi, and drew episodes of the American series published during the war, like Red Ryder and Superman, when due to the war, the American pages could not reach the publisher.

His Catholic faith inspired biographies of Don Bosco and Christopher Columbus, as well as a gospel in comics form, Emmanuel. After the war, he handed over his existing series' to younger artists: André Franquin got Spirou et Fantasio, Eddy Paape Jean Valhardi and Victor Hubinon Blondin et Cirage. In the 1950s, he drew new adventures of Jean Valhardi and Blondin et Cirage, while starting a new series, the western Jerry Spring. He also drew a biography of Baden-Powell. In the mid-1960s, he took over the artwork of Tanguy et Laverdure from Albert Uderzo and Redbeard from Victor Hubinon, both in Pilote magazine.

Jijé died at Versailles after a prolonged illness.

== Style and appreciation ==
Jijé is one of the few European artists to have worked on both realistic and humorous features. After starting in a Hergé-like Ligne claire style, he went on to create his own distinctive style, the so-called Atom style. This style mixed elements of the Ligne Claire with Art Déco elements, and became one of the defining styles of the Franco-Belgian comics. He also had a few young cartoonists living with him in his studio in Waterloo, thus creating the so-called "School of Marcinelle": this included André Franquin, Morris, and Will. Other famous artists working in the style and influence of the School of Marcinelle include Peyo, Jean Roba and Eddy Paape. Together with Franquin, Jijé is considered to be the father of the Atom style, which has had a revival since the 1980s with artists like Yves Chaland and Ever Meulen.

But Jijé was also the first master of the Franco-Belgian realistic comic, with Jerry Spring. Both his drawing style and his writing was very influential and groundbreaking. Later students of Jijé, not really working in the Atom style or the School of Marcinelle, include Jean Giraud (aka Moebius), Jean-Claude Mézières and Guy Mouminoux. Artist Jean Giraud started working in the style of Jijé before developing his own style.

He is held in high esteem by many of his peers, both those he tutored like Franquin and Moebius, and others. Tibet, author of Ric Hochet and Chick Bill, and for the major part of his career working for rival Tintin magazine, has said that "If Hergé is considered as God the Father, then Jijé undoubtedly is the Godfather".

In his writing, he can be seen as a transitional figure between the classic hero-driven comics like Alix or Michel Vaillant, and the modern anti-heroes like Blueberry or the works of Hermann Huppen. Jerry Spring still was the perfect, flawless hero, but the rest of the cast was no longer strictly divided into heroes, victims and villains, and no longer was the Native American the bloodthirsty figure he often was in earlier comics. A similar early anti-racist message was also given by Blondin et Cirage, with a white and a black boy featured as equals.

He also pursued sculpting and painting, mainly for his private use or for family and friends. His illustrations for stories like The Count of Monte Cristo (in the Belgian magazine Bonnes Soirées with René Follet) mix elements from his comic work and his paintings into one decorative style.

In 2004, the Maison de la Bande Dessinée, a comics museum in Brussels dedicated to his works, was created, later expanding its focus to include the creators he influenced.

== Awards ==
- 1975: Grand Prix Saint-Michel of the city of Brussels, Belgium
- 1976: Stripschapprijs, Netherlands
- 1977: Grand Prix de la ville d'Angoulême, France

== Bibliography ==
Cover of Jerry Spring #1 (1955)

- Jojo, 1936–1937, 2 albums
- Blondin et Cirage, 1939–1956, 8 albums
- Freddy Fred, 1939, 1 album
- Trinet et Trinette, 1939, 1 album
- Spirou et Fantasio, 1940–1950, 2 albums and some short stories
- Jean Valhardi, 1941–1966, 11 albums
- Don Bosco, 1943, 1 album (redrawn version 1950)
- Christophe Colomb, 1946, 1 album
- Emmanuel, 1947, 1 album
- Baden Powell, 1950, 1 album
- Jerry Spring, 1954–1980, 21 albums
- Blanc Casque, 1954, 1 album
- Bernadette Soubirous, 1958, 1 album
- Charles De Foucauld, 1959, 1 album
- Docteur Gladstone, 1964, 1 album
- Tanguy and Laverdure, 1971–1980, 10 albums
- Redbeard, 1979–1980, 2 albums

== Sources ==
- Jijé publications in Le journal de Spirou BDoubliées (in French)
- Jijé albums Bedetheque (in French)
