= Jidéhem =

Belgian comics artist

- Born: Jean De Mesmaeker; 21 December 1935 Brussels, Belgium
- Died: 30 April 2017 (aged 81) Brussels, Belgium
- Area: Cartoonist
- Notable works: Sophie; Starter; Gaston Lagaffe

Jean De Mesmaeker (21 December 1935 – 30 April 2017), known by the pseudonym Jidéhem (French: [ʒi.de.ɛm]; from the initials "JDM"), was a Belgian comics artist in the Marcinelle school tradition.

He was best known for his series featuring a cute, playful and adventurous young girl, Sophie. A creator of his own series Sophie, and Ginger, and noted for his work with Starter and Uhu-man, he is known for his collaborations and assistance to the work of André Franquin during a long career at the Franco-Belgian comics magazine Spirou, working on Spirou et Fantasio and Gaston Lagaffe, on which he shared co-authorship for several years.

== Sources ==
- Jidéhem publications in Spirou BDoubliées (in French)
