= Le lourd passé de Lagaffe =

Gaston Lagaffe #R5 Le lourd passé de Lagaffe
- Cover of the Belgian edition
- Date: 1986
- Series: Gaston Lagaffe
- Publisher: Dupuis

Creative team
- Writers: Franquin
- Artists: Franquin Jidéhem

Original publication
- Published in: Spirou
- Language: French
- ISBN: 2-8001-1473-8

Chronology
- Preceded by: En direct de la gaffe
- Followed by: Des gaffes et des dégâts

Le lourd passé de Lagaffe, written and drawn by Franquin and Jidéhem, is an album in the original Gaston Lagaffe series, numbered R5. It is made up of 46 pages and was published by Dupuis. It consists of a series of one-strip gags.

== Story ==
This album is made up of all the gags and illustrations that had not been previously published in album.

== Background ==
This album was definitely the last album numbered "R", but another album of re-publication would follow latter, the Gaston Lagaffe #0.

Inventions

- light backpack: thanks to a helium cylinder bonbonne which blows up a balloon it's easier to carry burdens
