= Gaffes et gadgets =

Gaston Lagaffe #0 Gaffes et gadgets
- Cover of the Belgian edition
- Date: 1985
- Series: Gaston Lagaffe
- Publisher: Dupuis

Creative team
- Writers: Franquin
- Artists: Franquin

Original publication
- Published in: Spirou
- Date of publication: 1957
- Language: French

Chronology
- Followed by: Gala de gaffes à gogo, R1, 1970

Gaffes et gadgets, written and drawn by Franquin, is an album in the original Gaston Lagaffe series, numbered 0. It is made up of strips and illustrations originally published in Spirou, and was published by Dupuis in 1985. It consists of 48 pages.

== Story ==
Fantasio finds it difficult to put up with Gaston's devices and inventions.

=== Inventions ===
- paperclip: the biggest paperclip ever invented
- Gastomobile: small vehicle which allows Gaston to get rapidly around Spirou offices.
- a rocket: it intriguished many foreign secret services
- anti-black ice chair: chair on casters to prevent Gaston from sliding on patches of black ice
- automatic filing chest: a small button open directly the filing chest, no need to open drawers
- artificial satellite : consists in making a ball turning around one's head

== Background ==
This album consists of illustrations published in Spirou around 1957, at a time when Gaston Lagaffe was a character who served to fill the blanks in the magazine. It also collects some strips which never before had been published in album, plus some who were previously published in the small-sized album entitled Gaston, published in 1960.
