= Gaffe à Lagaffe! =

Volume of the Gaston Lagaffe series

Gaston Lagaffe #15 Gaffe à Lagaffe!
- Cover of the Belgian edition
- Date: 1996
- Series: Gaston Lagaffe
- Publisher: Marsu Productions

Creative team
- Writers: Franquin
- Artists: Franquin

Original publication
- Published in: Spirou
- Date of publication: 1959 - 1987
- Language: French
- ISBN: 2-908-4627-10

Chronology
- Preceded by: La saga des gaffes, 1982

Gaffe à Lagaffe!, written and drawn by Franquin, is the fifteenth album of the original Gaston Lagaffe series.

== Story ==
=== Inventions ===
- petrol: special petrol for the Gastomobile, it also can cause unexpected fireworks
- anti-hold-up system: system which consists of spreading marbles to make robbers slide
- radio-controlled iron: efficient iron, but not to be lost from sight, as it tends to fly away
- heating for birds: system of pipes installed on the rooftop of Spirou editorial offices and connected to the heating system of the building
- English divan: sofa made with elasticated plastic and buttons that tend to suddenly break loose, causing high damage

== Background ==
This is the last album of the original Gaston Lagaffe series, and the first album published by Marsu Productions, who hold all the copyrights of Gaston Lagaffe. The album consists mostly of pages that haven't been published in albums, but were previously published in Spirou a long time ago. Only 13 new pages were published in this album, previously published in Spirou between 1986 and 1997. Roba and Cauvin have collaborated on one page.
