= Gare aux gaffes du gars gonflé =

Gaston Lagaffe #R3 Gare aux gaffes du gars gonflé
- Cover of the Belgian edition
- Date: 1973
- Series: Gaston Lagaffe
- Publisher: Dupuis

Creative team
- Writers: Franquin
- Artists: Franquin Jidéhem

Original publication
- Published in: Spirou
- Language: French
- ISBN: 2-8001-0308-6

Chronology
- Preceded by: Le bureau des gaffes en gros
- Followed by: En direct de la gaffe

Gare aux gaffes du gars gonflé, written and drawn by Franquin and Jidéhem, is an album of the original Gaston Lagaffe series, numbered R3. It is made up of 52 pages and was published by Dupuis. It consists of a series of one-strip gags.

== Story ==
Longtarin appears for the first time and watch over Gaston very carefully, all the more as he Gaston have acquired a strange automobile. Gaston signs a contract with De Mesmaeker.

=== Inventions ===
- vehicle to take downstairs: vehicle which slides on the ballisters, but cannot turn
- filter for cigarettes: filter which causes explosions, the rights were bought by a joke shop
- ejector seat for cars : seat not to leave lying in offices, for it can be dangerous for someone
- machine to cork bottles : machine that must been well-adjusted, at the risk of damages
- mini-go-kart : roller skate with the engine of a lawn mower
- petrol for rockets: dangerous petrol powder
- coffee maker with petrol : coffee maker which can take off like a rocket
- table: table hanged up to the ceiling to ease cleanup.
- relax-armchair: armchair with instructions for use that must be read before using
- swing with elasticated strings : swing with amplified movements
- overcoat linked to the central heating: allows to work having warm
- filing system: system consisting in tying each document to the ceiling with an elasticated thread
- automatic polishing: automatic machine to polish shoes, and occasionally trousers
- special flash: too strong flash that sets fire to clothes
- thread for Christmas trees: thread which make the tree turn, so that one can see the hidden part of it, and with the possibility to regulate the speed

== Background ==
This album is made up of the gags previously published in the small-sized albums Gare aux Gaffes and Les Gaffes d'un Gars Gonflé, numbered #1 and #5. It was first published in 1966 in a small format under the title Gare aux gaffes. It was re-edited in 1973 in a casual format. This is the first album of the series which contains full page strips.
