= L'abbaye truquée =

Spirou et Fantasio #22 L'abbaye truquée
- Cover of the Belgian edition
- Date: 1972
- Series: Spirou et Fantasio
- Publisher: Dupuis

Creative team
- Writers: Fournier
- Artists: Fournier

Original publication
- Published in: Spirou magazine
- Issues: 1. 1743 - #1766
- Date of publication: 1971
- Language: French
- ISBN: 2-8001-0024-9

Chronology
- Preceded by: Du glucose pour Noémie, 1971
- Followed by: Tora Torapa, 1973

L'abbaye truquée, written and drawn by Fournier, is the twenty-second album of the Spirou et Fantasio series, and the author's third, following the Spirou retirement of André Franquin. The story was initially serialised in Spirou magazine, before its release as a hardcover album in 1972.

== Story ==
Spirou, Fantasio and their guest Itoh Kata are visited by Charles Atan and his henchman Renaldo, members of The Triangle, who abduct the Japanese magician as a means of forcing his friends to join their organisation. The trail leads them to an old abbey located in an abandoned village. There, Spip, their pet squirrel, also disappears.

During this time, Kata's kidnappers are unable to keep him captive very long due to his conjuring tricks, no more than Spip who rejoins Spirou and Fantasio. When Spirou and Fantasio finally find Kata, he has just locked up all the men of the Triangle in a cell, with the exception of their leader, Charles Atan, and his assistant Renaldo.

Continuing their search, they prevent the self-destruction of the abbey and capture Atan. But Renaldo frees his boss and the two gangsters flee.
