= Gaffes, bévues et boulettes =

Gaston Lagaffe #11 Gaffes, bévues et boulettes
- Cover of the Belgian edition
- Date: 1973
- Series: Gaston Lagaffe
- Publisher: Dupuis

Creative team
- Writers: Franquin
- Artists: Franquin

Original publication
- Published in: Spirou
- Date of publication: 1974
- Language: French
- ISBN: 2-8001-0330-2

Chronology
- Preceded by: Le géant de la gaffe, 1972
- Followed by: Le gang des gaffeurs, 1974

Gaffes, bévues et boulettes, written and drawn by Franquin, is the eleventh album of the original Gaston Lagaffe series. It is composed of 46 strips previously published in Spirou. It was published in 1973 by Dupuis.

== Story ==
De Mesmaeker is back in the gags.

=== Inventions ===
- barbecue: made up of an old lid
- blend of fertilizers: it allows plants to grow very fast, including with carnivorous ones

== Background ==
This is the first album composed of 46 pages. Next albums will also comprise 46 strips.
