= Lagaffe nous gâte =

Gaston Lagaffe #8 Lagaffe nous gâte
- Cover of the Belgian edition
- Date: 1970
- Series: Gaston Lagaffe
- Publisher: Dupuis

Creative team
- Writers: Franquin
- Artists: Franquin

Original publication
- Published in: Spirou magazine
- Date of publication: 1970
- Language: French
- ISBN: 2-8001-0093-1

Chronology
- Preceded by: Un gaffeur sachant gaffer, 1969
- Followed by: Le cas Lagaffe, 1971

Lagaffe nous gâte, written and drawn by Franquin, is the eighth album of the original Gaston Lagaffe series. The 59 strips of this album were previously published in Spirou magazine.

== Story ==
Prunelle definitively replaced Fantasio. He begins to swear some "Grdidji" and the famous "Rogntudju". Several running gags feature new Gaston's inventions. Bubulle, Gaston 's fish, appears for the first time.

=== Inventions ===
- bomb against termites: bomb to be placed in each cupboard
- giant insecticide: very handful spray, but much too powerful
- cuckoo clock: cuckoo taking the form of a spaceship
- alarm clock: device which explodes when turned on
- giant fly: made of papier-mâché, wood and cardboard, the fly is too realistic and frightening
- personal atmosphere: invented perfume for Gaston's personal office which attracts horses
- special transformer: a transformer to allow Christmas strings to flash on and off, but too much powerful, so that it has effects on neighbouring houses
- experiment to extract energy from mouvements: when one tries to open the doors in the offices, it turns out to be very difficult
- a portable version of the Gaffophone, played in the woods for M'oiselle Jeanne, resulting to a catastrophic fall of the leaves from the nearby trees
