= Du cidre pour les étoiles =

Spirou et Fantasio #26 Du cidre pour les étoiles
- Cover of the Belgian edition
- Date: 1976
- Series: Spirou et Fantasio
- Publisher: Dupuis

Creative team
- Writers: Fournier
- Artists: Fournier

Original publication
- Published in: Spirou magazine
- Issues: 1. 1920 - #1939
- Date of publication: 1975
- Language: French
- ISBN: 2-8001-0462-7

Chronology
- Preceded by: Le gri-gri du Niokolo-Koba, 1974
- Followed by: L'Ankou, 1977

Du cidre pour les étoiles (Cider for the Stars), written and drawn by Fournier, is the twenty-sixth volume of the Spirou et Fantasio comic series, and the author's sixth, following the Spirou retirement of André Franquin. The story was initially serialised in Spirou magazine before it was released as a hardcover album in 1976.

== Story ==
In Cider for the Stars, while en route to Champignac, Spirou and Fantasio are confronted with strange events: the villagers see extraterrestrials and animals panic. When they arrive at the castle, the Count tells them that he is, in fact, housing three extraterrestrials ("Ksoriens"), enrolled in a mycology training program, but that their love for cider had led them to become careless. One of them is wounded in the town and manages to regain the castle, but its saucer is stolen by foreign secret agents. A whole patrol of Ksoriens then proceeds to land in order to retrieve the saucer, but one of them is in turn kidnapped. The Ksoriens threaten to put the whole area to sleep in order to help them in their task, but the Count opposes the plan. In the nick of time Spirou and Fantasio find the saucer and the Ksorien, and the extraterrestrials capture the secret agents. The Mayor, as is his wont, suspects that the Count is conducting secret experiments and orders the castle to be searched, forcing the Ksoriens to leave.
