= Un gaffeur sachant gaffer =

Gaston Lagaffe #7 Un gaffeur sachant gaffer
- Cover of the Belgian edition
- Date: 1968
- Series: Gaston Lagaffe
- Publisher: Dupuis

Creative team
- Writers: Franquin
- Artists: Franquin

Original publication
- Published in: Spirou magazine
- Date of publication: 1969
- Language: French
- ISBN: 2-8001-0089-3

Chronology
- Preceded by: Des gaffes et des dégâts, 1968
- Followed by: Lagaffe nous gâte, 1970

Un gaffeur sachant gaffer, written and drawn by Franquin, is the seventh album of the original Gaston Lagaffe series. The 59 strips of this album were previously published in Spirou magazine.

== Story ==
In this album, Léon Prunelle replace definitively and officially Fantasio who left the office to make reports. Freddy les-doigts-de-fées appears for the first time.
