= Le cas Lagaffe =

Gaston Lagaffe #9 Le cas Lagaffe
- Cover of the Belgian edition
- Date: 1971
- Series: Gaston Lagaffe
- Publisher: Dupuis

Creative team
- Writers: Franquin
- Artists: Franquin

Original publication
- Published in: Spirou
- Date of publication: 1971
- Language: French
- ISBN: 978-2800100913

Chronology
- Preceded by: Lagaffe nous gâte, 1970
- Followed by: Le géant de la gaffe, 1972

Le cas Lagaffe, written and drawn by Franquin, is the ninth album of the original Gaston Lagaffe series. It is composed of 52 strips previously published in Spirou. It was published in 1971 by Dupuis.

== Story ==
Two new Gaston's pets appear: the cat, the laughing gull, plus already presented the mouse Cheese and the fish Bubulle. These new pets cause most of the gags of the album.

== Background ==
The number of pages is 54, whereas previous albums consisted of 59.
