= Le gang des gaffeurs =

Gaston Lagaffe #12 Le gang des gaffeurs
- Cover of the Belgian edition
- Date: 1979
- Series: Gaston Lagaffe
- Publisher: Dupuis

Creative team
- Writers: Franquin
- Artists: Franquin

Original publication
- Published in: Spirou
- Date of publication: 1974
- Language: French
- ISBN: 2-8001-0400-7

Chronology
- Preceded by: Gaffes, bévues et boulettes, 1973
- Followed by: Lagaffe mérite des baffes, 1979

Le gang des gaffeurs, written and drawn by Franquin, is the twelfth album of the original Gaston Lagaffe series. It is composed of 46 strips previously published in Spirou. It was published in 1974 by Dupuis.

== Story ==
=== Inventions ===
- divan : highly comfortable divan, full of late readers' letters
- giant shoe :shoe made for a shoes seller
- a giant aquarium: a network of pipes in which water flows
- scented aerosol: a revolutionary substance through which the light can not go
- machine to play cup-and-ball: device badly adjusted, so that it can hit the user
- gas generator: engine fed with fuel, but too much polluting
- miniature plane: this plane perfectly works, but the radio control turns out to control a Russian satellite

== Background ==
This is the last album before Franquin's breakdown. Next publications will become rarer.
