= En direct de la gaffe =

Gaston Lagaffe #R4 En direct de la gaffe
- Cover of the Belgian edition
- Date: 1974
- Series: Gaston Lagaffe
- Publisher: Dupuis

Creative team
- Writers: Franquin
- Artists: Franquin Delporte

Original publication
- Published in: Spirou
- Language: French
- ISBN: 2-8001-0370-1

Chronology
- Preceded by: Gare aux gaffes du gars gonflé
- Followed by: Le lourd passé de Lagaffe

En direct de la gaffe, written and drawn by Franquin and Delporte, is an album of the original Gaston Lagaffe series, numbered R4. It is made up of 44 pages and was published by Dupuis. It consists of a series of one-strip gags.

== Story ==
This album is made up of small-sized strip and article relating Gaston' blunders. All the gags and articles, entitled "En direct de la rédaction", written by Yvan Delporte for the Gaston Lagaffe series are grouped in this album. It is also constituted of Spirou covers. Many new characters are introduced, such as Jules Soutier, Bertrand Labévue, Beaucoudeau and Mélanie Molaire. The Gaffophone also appears for the first time.

=== Inventions ===
- trouser press: system to make the ironing of trousers easier
- Klaxophone: instrument made with car horns
- anti-mosquito powder : powder which causes explosions and attracts mosquitoes
- guitar walkie-talkie: built so that Jeanne can constantly listen to Gaston's guitar and voice

== Background ==
This album was expected to be the last album of reprinting. The album reprinted were numbered with a "R" indicate it was a re-publication. It is explained in the first page of the album that any Gaston Lagaffe album #5 nor R5 would never exist, because an album #6 had previously been published, and the re-publications were said to be finished. However, this announcement was wrong, for much later, in 1986, an album R5 was published, consisting of strips previously unpublished in albums.
