= La saga des gaffes =

Comic strip compilation

Gaston Lagaffe #14 La saga des gaffes
- Cover of the Belgian edition
- Date: 1982
- Series: Gaston Lagaffe
- Publisher: Dupuis

Creative team
- Writers: Franquin
- Artists: Franquin

Original publication
- Published in: Spirou
- Date of publication: 1980 - 1982
- Language: French
- ISBN: 2-8001-0955-6

Chronology
- Preceded by: Lagaffe mérite des baffes, 1979
- Followed by: Gaffe à Lagaffe !, 1996

La Saga des gaffes, written and drawn by Franquin, is the fourteenth album of the original Gaston Lagaffe series. It is made up of 44 strips previously published in Spirou.

== Story ==
Most of the running gags feature Longtarin and Lagaffe, engaged in an intense struggle.

== Background ==
This is the last album of the original Gaston Lagaffe series which is entirely composed of new comics strips.
