= Le gri-gri du Niokolo-Koba =

Spirou et Fantasio #25 Le gri-gri du Niokolo-Koba
- Cover of the Belgian edition
- Date: 1974
- Series: Spirou et Fantasio
- Publisher: Dupuis

Creative team
- Writers: Fournier
- Artists: Fournier

Original publication
- Published in: Spirou magazine
- Issues: 1. 1853 - #1873
- Date of publication: 1973
- Language: French
- ISBN: 2-8001-0398-1

Chronology
- Preceded by: Tembo Tabou, 1974
- Followed by: Du cidre pour les étoiles, 1977

Le gri-gri du Niokolo-Koba, written and drawn by Fournier, is the twenty-fifth album of the Spirou et Fantasio series, and the author's fifth, following the retirement from Spirou magazine of André Franquin. The story was initially serialised in Spirou, before it was released as a hardcover album in 1974.

== Story ==
In The Gri-Gri of Niokolo-Koba, a native of Senegal throws himself in the taxi of Spirou and Fantasio, asking them to carry the contents of a bag that he leaves them in Mansa Moussa, in Niokolo-Koba, before disappearing in a dazzling flash. The two heroes leave then for Africa, and are joined by strong Sété Bagaré, which binds friendship with them. Once in Senegal, they learn that Mansa Moussa also disappeared, and that what they transport in the bag is not other than the grigri of the individual. Arriving at the park, they are informed of the disappearance of most of the reserve's animals. Ororéa, which inquired in the reserve, occurs then with the photographic proof that the animals disappeared under the effect of the diamond of Koli, also responsible for the evaporation of the individual met in Europe, who is none other than the nephew of Mansa Moussa. After some adventures, they end up finding the gangsters. The diamond of Koli is replaced in its sheath, and all those that disappeared return, just like the animals. Mansa Moussa privately explains to Spirou that the grigri contained the plans of a diamantiferous vein under the park that the gangsters coveted. Those had disappeared following an imprudence with diamonds of Koli, alone, Mansa Foamed and Spirou know the truth from now on.
