= Le géant de la gaffe =

Gaston Lagaffe #10 Le géant de la gaffe
- Cover of the Belgian edition
- Date: 1972
- Series: Gaston Lagaffe
- Publisher: Dupuis

Creative team
- Writers: Franquin
- Artists: Franquin

Original publication
- Published in: Spirou
- Date of publication: 1972
- Language: French
- ISBN: 2-8001-0092-3

Chronology
- Preceded by: Le cas Lagaffe, 1971
- Followed by: Gaffes, bévues et boulettes, 1973

Le géant de la gaffe, written and drawn by Franquin, is the tenth album of the original Gaston Lagaffe series. It is composed of 52 strips previously published in Spirou. It was published in 1972 by Dupuis.

== Story ==
Le géant de la gaffe is the first album in which Franquin inserts eccentric signatures. Monsieur De Mesmaeker is less present than in previous albums.

=== Inventions ===
- alcohol detector: device to measure the rate of alcohol in the blood, it must not be exposed to fire
- electric umbrella: umbrella that can open and close pushing on the same button
- coffee-maker: personal invention that delivers very strong coffee
- graft for cactus: graft which allow cactuses to grow extremely rapidly
- spring-wire for phones: wire very elasticated, that may hurt dangerously the user
- soap: soap that blows a lot of bubbles once it is in contact with water
- automatic door: door that open automatically thanks to photoelectric cells
- heating system: system for cars installed which conducts the gas by a chimney
- spray for carburetor: an effective but polluting system
- hand-armchair : very comfortable armchair designed as a giant hand
- monorail: device linked to rails set in the ceiling to get around easily in the offices
- monorail monoplace: the same monorail, modified -because being too low, it could hurt people- but with a default in the brake system

== Background ==
This album is the last which is made up of 52 pages.
