= Lagaffe mérite des baffes =

Gaston Lagaffe #13 Lagaffe mérite des baffes
- Cover of the Belgian edition
- Date: 1979
- Series: Gaston Lagaffe
- Publisher: Dupuis

Creative team
- Writers: Franquin
- Artists: Franquin

Original publication
- Published in: Spirou
- Date of publication: 1975 - 1979
- Language: French
- ISBN: 2-8001-0658-1

Chronology
- Preceded by: Le gang des gaffeurs, 1974
- Followed by: La saga des gaffes, 1982

Lagaffe mérite des baffes, written and drawn by Franquin, is the thirteenth album of the original Gaston Lagaffe series. It is made up of 46 strips previously published in Spirou.

== Story ==
In this album, a struggle between Longtarin and Lagaffe begins. This theme will also be the occasion of most of the gags in the next album.

=== Inventions ===
- Parking meter: fake meter, so well imitated that drivers fill it
- Mini lawn mower: miniature lawn mower to avoid cutting daisies
- Heating for motorbikes: suit linked to the radiator of the motorbike, and in which heated water flows, so that the motorcyclist is never cold; the only problem is that it lacks a regulator
- Electricity generator: thanks to a dynamo, a treadle lights a small lamp and allows the staff to deal with very urgent work in case of power failure
- Inflatable bag: bag to protect car occupants in case of accident, it goes off even in case of slight contact

== Background ==
The first page of the album deals with the R5 album case. Prunelle announces that any #5 album will never be published.
