= Kodo le tyran =

28th album of the Spirou et Fantasio series

Spirou et Fantasio #28 Kodo le tyran
- Cover of the Belgian edition
- Date: 1979
- Series: Spirou et Fantasio
- Publisher: Dupuis

Creative team
- Writers: Fournier
- Artists: Fournier

Original publication
- Published in: Spirou magazine
- Issues: #2088 - #2109
- Date of publication: 1978
- Language: French
- ISBN: 2-8001-0644-1

Chronology
- Preceded by: L'Ankou, 1977
- Followed by: Des haricots partout, 1980

Kodo le tyran ("Kodo the Tyrant"), written and drawn by Jean-Claude Fournier, is the twenty-eighth album of the Spirou et Fantasio series, and the author's eighth, following the Spirou retirement of André Franquin. The story was initially serialised in Spirou magazine, before being released as a hardcover album in 1979.

== Story ==
In Kodo the Tyrant, Spirou and Fantasio are in Burma and try to enter the small country of Catung, a dictatorship closed abroad. Thanks to a drunk pilot, John Madflying, they reach that point, but are separated. Fantasio meets the inspector general of the Mafia, his quasi-double, who controls really Catung, and this one the nap arms with the fist to take its place, because the inspector for submission to taking his retirement. Fantasio thus joined the capital and takes a certain pleasure to ridicule Jataka Kodo, the dictator.

Spirou, it, are found in company of the rebels of Ava Savati. Those learn thanks to the pigeon from Prabang, a mole infiltrated in the palace, that the inspector general and Kodo intend to go to inspect the warehouses of Kuor Lang, they will thus pass on the bridge of Pagor Tevat, that Savati decides to make jump. However, Kodo meets with its lieutenants Chop Suey and Matteo and also proposes to blow up the bridge in order to eliminate Fantasio, which imposes restrictions of its capacity to him.

Little time after the departure of Savati, Spirou discovers with horror the identity of the inspector general, but it is too late…
