= Le bureau des gaffes en gros =

Gaston Lagaffe #R2 Le bureau des gaffes en gros
- Cover of the Belgian edition
- Date: 1972
- Series: Gaston Lagaffe
- Publisher: Dupuis

Creative team
- Writers: Franquin
- Artists: Franquin, Jidéhem

Original publication
- Published in: Spirou
- Language: French
- ISBN: 2-8001-0094-X

Chronology
- Preceded by: Gala de gaffes à gogo
- Followed by: Gare aux gaffes du gars gonflé

Le bureau des gaffes en gros, written and drawn by Franquin and Jidéhem, is an album of the original Gaston Lagaffe series, numbered R2. It is made up of 52 pages and was published by Dupuis. It consists of a series of one-strip gags.

== Story ==
Gaston invents a robot and strange appeaux. Mademoiselle Jeanne appear for the first time.

== Background ==
This album was first published in the Italian format in 1965, under the title Gaffes en gros. He was published at the casual format in 1972. It is made up of the gags first published in the album #4, plus gags previously unpublished in albums.
