= L'Ankou =

Franco-Belgian comic book

Spirou et Fantasio #27 L'Ankou
- Cover of the Belgian edition
- Date: 1977
- Series: Spirou et Fantasio
- Publisher: Dupuis

Creative team
- Writers: Fournier
- Artists: Fournier

Original publication
- Published in: Spirou magazine
- Issues: 1. 2000 - #2019
- Date of publication: 1976
- Language: French
- ISBN: 2-8001-0553-4

Chronology
- Preceded by: Du cidre pour les étoiles, 1976
- Followed by: Kodo le tyran, 1979

L'Ankou, written and drawn by Fournier, is the twenty-seventh album of the Spirou et Fantasio series, and the author's seventh, following the Spirou retirement of André Franquin. The story was initially serialised in Spirou magazine, before it was released as a hardcover album in 1977.

== Story ==
In L'Ankou, Ororéa invites Spirou and Fantasio to join her at a congress of magicians in Brittany. When they arrive, they meet strange L'Ankou, who objects to the presence of a nuclear thermal power station on his land. They then save Ororéa from an aggression, but the gangsters manage to escape. At their arrival at the hotel, they find out that Itoh Kata is amongst the magicians invited. The others are telepath Al Kazar, hypnotist monk Capuccino and telekinesist Rethros Athana. Those are currently developing a magic trick based on teleportation. Fantasio is used as guinea-pig during the first representation but is abducted by the gangsters. Ankou reappears and suggests to Spirou and his friends not to try anything against the kidnappers. The latter exert blackmail on the magicians: they are to deliver a revolutionary product developed at the power station in exchange for Fantasio. Kata decides not to say anything to his friends and together, the magicians steal the product. Meanwhile, Fantasio manages to escape and warns the police with Spirou and Ororéa. The gangsters are arrested but the product stolen by the magicians threatens to explode. Fortunately, Spirou warns the magicians in time and Itoh Kata makes the product vanish. This event leads to the power station closing down. L'Ankou is thus grateful towards Spirou and his companions.
