= Gaston 19 =

- Cover of the Belgian edition
- Series: Gaston Lagaffe
- Publisher: Dupuis

Creative team
- Writers: Franquin
- Artists: Franquin

Original publication
- Published in: Spirou magazine
- Date of publication: 1999
- Language: French

Gaston 19, written and drawn by Franquin, is the last album of the Gaston Lagaffe series ever published. It was published in December 1999, after Franquin's death, by Marsu Productions. It has 44 pages.

== Story ==
The album contains some mini-récits, advertisements and drawings.

=== Inventions ===
- paint brush with tank and battery : brush so efficient that it paint also the user
- electric roller skates : roller skates without brakes nor switch
- miniature drill : highly efficient drill that can accidentally cause some damages
- small ventilator: too efficient, it flies away
- fan with motor: fan with battery to be placed on the wrist, it also allows someone to fly
- electric cigar-cutter : this cigar-cutter not only cut cigars but also grind them
- shaving brush with rotary hair: with too powerful batteries, it can have unexpected effects (Gaston 19)
- bicycle on baterries: batteries are placed in the frame of the bike
- heating soles: non-slip soles equipped with a heating system against black ice
- miniature electric doll: doll of Prunelle
- fire-extinger walkie-talkie: to communicate easily and avoiding being exposed
- antifreeze : this antifreeze makes bubbles
- radio-controlled bin

== Background ==
The album is not part of the initial series, which is made up of 16 albums, numbered from 0 to 15. It is the last album of a new series. Initially, the new series, launched after the author's death, was made up of 18 albums, but some works had been published only in Spirou magazine but never in albums, and other content had never been published anywhere.
