= Du glucose pour Noémie =

Spirou et Fantasio #21 Du glucose pour Noémie
- Cover of the Belgian edition
- Date: 1971
- Series: Spirou et Fantasio
- Publisher: Dupuis

Creative team
- Writers: Fournier
- Artists: Fournier

Original publication
- Published in: Spirou magazine
- Issues: 1. 1682 - #1710, #1724
- Date of publication: 1970, 1971
- Language: French
- ISBN: 2-8001-0023-0

Chronology
- Preceded by: Le faiseur d'or, 1970
- Followed by: L'abbaye truquée, 1972

Du glucose pour Noémie, written and drawn by Fournier, is the twentyfirst album of the Spirou et Fantasio series, and the author's second, following the Spirou retirement of André Franquin. The story was initially serialised in Spirou magazine before it was published, along with the short story Un faux départ, as a hardcover album in 1971.

== Story ==
In Glucose for Noémie, the story continues where Le champignon nippon of the previous album left off. Ito Kata, a well-known Japanese conjuror, has entrusted Spirou and Fantasio with a special mushroom which he wants them to take back to their friend the Count of Champignac, a leading mycologist. The mushroom is also coveted by the Triangle, a SPECTRE-like, world-spanning criminal organization.

Having escaped the Triangle's agents, Spirou and Fantasio stand stunned at Tokyo airport when they find the parcel they were transporting empty...

In A False Departure, Spip is determined to run away from home.

== Background ==
This album offers no explanation of Marsupilami's sudden absence (see Le faiseur d'or).

Ito Kata would become a regular secondary character during Fournier's run on the series.
