= Gaston (comics) =

Belgian comic series

- Main character Gaston Lagaffe with the logo of the French series
- Author: André Franquin; Delaf
- Illustrator(s): André Franquin (1957 - 1997), Delaf (since 2023)
- Website: www.gastonlagaffe.com
- Current status/schedule: Running
- Launch date: February 28, 1957
- Publisher: Dupuis
- Genre(s): Humor comics, satire

Gaston is a Belgian gag-a-day comic strip created in 1957 by the Belgian cartoonist André Franquin in the Franco-Belgian comics magazine Spirou. The series, serving as a spin-off of the magazine's primary series Spirou et Fantasio, focuses on the everyday life of Gaston Lagaffe (whose surname means "the blunder"), a lazy and accident-prone office junior who works at Spirou's office in Brussels. Gaston is very popular in large parts of Europe (especially in Belgium and France) and has been translated into over a dozen languages, but except for a handful of strips, there was no English translation until Cinebook began publishing English language editions of Gaston books as Gomer Goof in July, 2017.

In 2023, the series was revived by Québécois author Delaf.

Since the 1980s Gaston has appeared on a wide variety of merchandise.

== Publication history ==
Gaston's very first (silent) appearance in 1957

André Franquin who was then in charge of Spirou et Fantasio, the primary series of Spirou magazine, first introduced the character Gaston in issue n°985, published February 28, 1957. The picture above is found on the 5th page of the magazine in segment of the story, Le Piano à Bretelles (written by Paul Berna and illustrated by Morris) which only contains letters and large images. The initial purpose was to fill up empty spaces in the magazine and offer a (comically artificial) glimpse of life behind-the-scenes at the paper. His arrival was carefully orchestrated with a teasing campaign over several months, based on ideas by Franquin, Yvan Delporte and Jidéhem, with mysterious blue footprints in the margins of the magazine.

For the Spirou issue N°1000 cover, Franquin drew 999 heads of Spirou, and one of Gaston, and the first Gaston full-page gag was featured in a bonus supplement.

In the context of the fictive story evolving at the magazine offices, the man behind the footprints, Gaston, finally turned up for a memorable job interview, telling the bemused Spirou that he didn't remember with whom or for what he had been called. Fantasio, functioning as the magazine's opinionated face of signed editorials, subsequently announced in a formal communiqué that Gaston would be the first "Hero-without-a-job". Gaston's blunders continued during a stressful and frustrating period for Fantasio, pushing him to go on a 4-week strike and eventually a vacation, initiating the story Vacances sans histoires.

From Spirou issue n°1025, the single-panel gags were replaced with Gaston strips running at the bottom of the editor's pages, signed by both Jidéhem and Franquin. These ran until 1959 when Gaston acquired a weekly half-page, which lasted until the mid-60s when the Gaston Lagaffe gags grew to full-page.

=== Spirou et Fantasio appearances ===
Gaston's first Spirou et Fantasio appearance

Gaston's first cameo in a Spirou et Fantasio adventure took place in Spirou issue n°1014 (19 September 1957) as he graced two frames of Le voyageur du Mésozoïque (French: "The Traveller from the Mesozoic Era"). He is first seen "on the streets of the capital" riding a bicycle while reading a newspaper, obliviously littering papers, and then appears two frames later, bruised and dazed, dragging his deformed bike, having ridden into the middle of ongoing traffic.

His second cameo occurred in the early panels of the story Vacances sans histoires (fr: "Quiet Holidays") (later included in the album Le gorille a bonne mine) which was published between November 1957 and January 1958. Gaston appears at the start of the story when, cycling and lighting a cigarette at the same time, he runs past a red light and very nearly gets hit by Spirou and Fantasio's Turbot I sportscar. Towards the end, he is again cycling, this time down the wrong way of a one-way street, when he actually gets hit by the new Turbot II. More surprised than anything else, stretched out on the front of the car, he simply tells Spirou and Fantasio that they are requested back at the Spirou offices.

Gaston was given a larger part in the following adventure, La Foire aux gangsters ("The Gangster's Fair", included in the book Le nid des Marsupilamis). Here, Gaston hinders Spirou's investigation into a baby's kidnapping. Spirou's search leads him to a fairground and Gaston, who just happens to be there, keeps approaching him. When Spirou, desperate to keep a low profile, whispers to Gaston that they "don't know each other", he keeps insisting that they do or else suggesting that it is Spirou who looks like someone he knows. When Spirou recovers the baby, the kidnappers approach Gaston, who they know was previously talking to Spirou, and he, quite innocently, offers to show them the way to Spirou's house for what he thinks will be a pleasant social evening. Fortunately for Spirou and the little victim, Gaston keeps getting his directions wrong and he and the gangsters end up in a dead-end, surrounded by police and in jail. In the final frame (of the book version) Gaston is released from prison, to the scornful glances of the passing public.

In 1961, Franquin and Yvan Delporte wrote a radio serial "Les Robinsons du rail" (French for "The Railway Robinsons"). In this story, Fantasio is sent to cover the inauguration of the first nuclear powered train and, since no one else is available, is compelled to take Gaston with him for assistance. Needless to say, with Gaston on board, things start to go wrong and the train is soon speeding out of control, leaving Spirou and the train designer the task of sorting things out. The serial was broadcast on Belgian radio in 1961. It was later published in Spirou magazine in 1964 and as a book, but in text form with Franquin and Jidéhem contributing just a few illustrations.

Gaston also appeared in Franquin's two final Spirou et Fantasio stories, published in Panade à Champignac. He is featured in the opening pages of the title story, and plays a central role in Bravo les Brothers in which he offers Fantasio a troupe of performing chimpanzees as an unwanted birthday present.

Gaston does not appear in QRN sur Bretzelburg (published in 1961-63), but in one scene Fantasio is about to endure painful agony by torturers in a totalitarian state. He thus decides that the best thing to do is to focus on emptiness and think of Gaston.

Jean-Claude Fournier succeeded Franquin as artist and writer of the Spirou and Fantasio series with Le faiseur d'or, published in 1969. Kidnapped by gangsters, leading scientist the Count of Champignac is forced by them to come up with a means of helping them with their plans. Thinking of Gaston, he comes up with the kind of recipe that the office idiot would devise, but the resulting and disgusting mixture does have the results that the gangsters wanted, much to the Count's annoyance.

When Tome and Janry took over the series a couple of references to Gaston were made in the album "La jeunesse de Spirou" (Spirou's youth) where a scam artist is publishing a faux number five album of the Gaston series. And during the tale about Spirou's childhood Gaston's car is seen parked in front of the publishing company.

More recently a reference to Gaston was made in the album "Aux sources du Z" (The source of Z) by Morvan and Munuera, when Spirou uses the time shifting machine he remarks that the experience is yucky, almost as bad as the Champagne that Gaston made out of fermented potatoes. Later in that album when Spirou has to use the time shifter once more he remarks that it's time to take a sip from Gaston's Champagne again.

=== Focus on Gaston ===
For a period, Franquin had trained his assistant Jidéhem to take over the strip in due time, but Jidéhem felt no affinity with the character and remained the background artist. Franquin inversely grew tired of Spirou et Fantasio (a series he had not created himself, but inherited from Joseph "Jijé" Gillain in 1946) and decided in 1968 to resign the job, and concentrate on the increasingly popular Gaston. Gaston's antics appeared in Spirou from 1957 to 1996, a few months before Franquin's death in 1997, although new material appeared only sporadically after the early 1980s.

== Format and appeal ==
Gaston Lagaffe follows the classic "gag" format of Franco-Belgian comics: one-page stories (initially half-a-page) with an often visual punchline, sometimes foreshadowed in the dialogue. The humour mixes slapstick, puns and running gags. Franquin's style is characterised by extremely nervous characters and action and very quotable dialogue. The series is much loved not only for its perfectly timed comedy, but also for its warm outlook on everyday life. Although Gaston works at Spirou magazine and one of his colleagues is a cartoonist, the series satirises office life in general rather than the publishing or comics business; Franquin himself worked at home. In the later episodes, the reader could discover a visual reference to the story in Franquin's signature at the bottom of the page.

== Characters ==
=== Gaston Lagaffe ===
Gaston was hired - somewhat mysteriously - as an office junior at the offices of the Journal de Spirou (the real-life publication in which the strip appeared), having wandered in cluelessly. The strip usually focuses on his efforts to avoid doing any work, and indulge instead in hobbies or naps while all around him panic over deadlines, lost mail and contracts. Initially, Gaston was an irritating simpleton, but he developed a genial personality and a sense of humour. Common sense however always eludes him, and he has an almost supernatural ability to cause disasters ("gaffes") to which he reacts with his catchphrase: "M'enfin?!" ("Wha-huh...?"). His job involves chiefly dealing with readers' mail. The ever-growing piles of unanswered letters ("courrier en retard") and the attempts of Fantasio and Léon Prunelle to make him deal with it or to retrieve documentation are recurring themes of the comic.

Gaston's age is a mystery – Franquin himself confessed that he neither knew nor indeed wanted to know it. Although Gaston has a job, a car and his own place, he often acts like a young teenager. In the publication of Dossier Franquin Franquin had said that Gaston is a boy in his late teens but certainly not in his twenties. He is invariably dressed in a tight polo-necked green jumper and blue-jeans, and worn-out espadrilles. It is said that his appearance was originally based on that of Yvan Delporte, editor of the Journal de Spirou at that time. Also, in his first gags, Gaston was an avid cigarette smoker, but his habit was slowly phased out.

Gaston alternates between phases of extreme laziness, when it is near impossible to wake him up, and hyper-activity, when he creates various machines or plays with office furniture. Over the years, he has experimented with cooking, rocket science, music, electronics, decorating, telecommunication, chemistry and many other hobbies, all with uniformly catastrophic results. His Peter Pan-like refusal to grow up and care about his work makes him very endearing, while his antics account for half the stress experienced by his unfortunate co-workers.

Gaston's disregard for authority or even public safety are not confined to his office — they occasionally threaten the entire city. He is not above covering road signs with advertising posters or even snowmen, reasoning that it is the only decent use that they have — being oblivious to the chaos and accidents that covering the road signs cause.

==== Gaston's pets ====
Gaston is very fond of animals (as was Franquin of drawing them) and keeps several pets. The main ones are a depressed, aggressive seagull and a hyperactive cat. Like Franquin's most famous animal creation, the Marsupilami, those two never acquired a name and are just referred to as the cat and the seagull. Gaston also sometimes keeps a mouse (Cheese), and a goldfish (Bubulle). The animals are sometimes Gaston's partners in crime, sometimes the victims of his clumsiness and sometimes the perpetrators of nefarious schemes. They are depicted more realistically than the pets in Spirou, in that we are not privy to their inner thoughts. The cat and seagull in particular can be fairly vicious, to the extent of forcing all employees and an unwilling De Mesmaeker to wear helmets, but never to Gaston himself. They often team up to obtain food. For example, in volume 14, the seagull distracts the fishmonger while the cat steals a fish, which they later eat together.

=== The office co-workers ===
Fantasio, a character originally hailing from the Spirou et Fantasio series, is the first main supporting character and irritable straight man to Gaston in the early part of the series. Franquin acknowledged with regret that he had totally destroyed the original clown-like personality of the character by using him in this role, which required him to be formal and businesslike and behave as an authority figure. In Gaston, instead of having adventures and doing some reporting, Fantasio has an editorial role in the magazine and, as such, is burdened with the impossible task of trying to make Gaston actually do some work. He is the main character's hierarchical superior, often seen trying to sign contracts with Monsieur De Mesmaeker.

His job in this series could be described as that of an office manager. In opposition to his role in Spirou, in Gaston, Fantasio was a comically serious character, a regular victim of Gaston's goofy antics who thus became to Fantasio what Fantasio is to Spirou. His seriousness and stress plays the opposite of Gaston's carefree and relaxed attitude towards life and work. Although he appears to be mostly on friendly terms with Gaston, his underling's chaotic behaviour often makes him lose his temper. On occasion, he becomes aggressive and tries to get even by pranking and hazing Gaston.

By the time the album Bravo les Brothers came out (which, while nominally a Spirou et Fantasio story, was effectively hijacked by Gaston), it was decided that it was time for Fantasio to leave. When Fournier took over the Spirou et Fantasio series in 1970, Fantasio was essentially removed from Gaston. At first, he made the occasional guest appearance, even once returning to the office itself, his absence explained as being away in Champignac. Otherwise, from 1970 onwards, he gradually disappears from the series as Franquin abandoned Spirou et Fantasio to devote himself solely to Gaston, appearing for the last time in gag n ° 551 (and with a cameo in gag 662 as a prehistoric hunter). His role as the office's authority figure is completely taken over by Léon Prunelle.

Spirou of Spirou et Fantasio was a fairly major supporting character in the comic's very early days, though his role was quickly reduced to occasional appearances. He was on generally friendly terms with Gaston, sometimes trying to mediate between him and Fantasio, usually without much success. Like Fantasio, he vanished entirely from the comic when Franquin stopped drawing Spirou et Fantasio.

Léon Prunelle, an editor at the Journal de Spirou. He has black hair, a short beard and wears glasses. Originally a background character without much detail and a relatively calm demeanor, Prunelle eventually takes up the role of office supervisor when Fantasio is removed as a regular character. He is then revealed to be even more short-tempered than his predecessor from whom he has inherited not only the mammoth task of making Gaston work, but also the job of signing contracts with important businessman Aimé De Mesmaeker (see below). Initially optimistic about this, Prunelle slowly realizes that he cannot win. However he refuses to give up and sometimes resorts to drastic measures, such as locking up Gaston in the cellar or even a cupboard.

Prunelle comes across as a tortured person who will end up having a nervous breakdown from taking everything too seriously . Perpetually at the end of his tether, he is constantly running around barking angry orders, turns a nasty reddish purple when disaster strikes and regularly utters his trademark outburst "Rogntudju!" (a mangled version of "Nom de Dieu", roughly the equivalent of "bloody hell", which was unacceptable in a children's comic when the strip was originally published). Often a victim of Gaston's inventions and projects, his efforts to counter his subordinate's laziness and carefree attitude leave him at the brink of exhaustion and violent rage attacks. A large portion of Prunelle's time is spent chasing Gaston around and to remind him that he has to deal with late mail, prevent him from taking unnecessary naps or breaks and to stop him from using office hours for cooking, tinkering, inventing and, of course, goofing around.

In short, Prunelle's role is that of the comically ineffective authority figure, constantly frustrated by Gaston's shenanigans. Occasionally, he manages to turn the tables on Gaston, preventing him from causing chaos or actually pranking him and showing that he is not without a sense of humor.

Yves Lebrac, (first presented with the name Yvon Lebrac), an in-house cartoonist, is comparatively laid-back. He is fond of puns and we see him woo (and eventually win) one of the attractive secretary girls over the course of the series. Although mostly on good terms with Gaston (unlike Prunelle), he occasionally loses his temper when deadlines loom and Gaston's interference becomes too much. When not a victim of "gaffes", he is a lenient comrade of Gaston, and the character with which Franquin himself most identified.

Joseph Boulier, a surly accountant for Éditions Dupuis, the publishers of the magazine. He states that he will not rest until he has tracked down every useless expense in the company, and in particular those of Gaston. However, his attempts to cause Gaston grief backfire in spectacular ways. He represents the more serious side of the comics publishing business.

Mademoiselle Jeanne ("M'oiselle Jeanne" to Gaston), one of the magazine's secretaries, is Gaston's love interest. A short redhead with freckles, glasses, a conservative dress style and very long hair, she was first depicted as comically unattractive in a gag where Gaston needs a partner for the back end of his pantomime horse costume and chooses Jeanne because of her ponytail. However, in the following appearances, she increasingly becomes prettier and more attractive, if never really a conventional beauty queen: her body changes from pear-shaped to curvaceous, she pays more attention to her makeup and her long hair, her dress style gradually switches to modern (and often revealing) outfits and she becomes more confident in her interactions with Gaston and other characters.

Jeanne is a perfect match for Gaston. She wholeheartedly admires his talent, courage and inventiveness and is utterly oblivious to his lack of common sense — of which she herself has fairly little. However their courtship seems perpetually stuck at the very first step. They address each other with the formal vous and as "Mister" and "Miss" and see each other mainly at the office — though they have the occasional outing together. This platonic relationship, in a way, is in keeping with Gaston's refusal or inability to grow up. It is revealed in the album En direct de la gaffe that Jeanne is color blind: she can't tell green from red. She also still lives with her mother and, although it is assumed that she is well beyond her teens, is shown grounded after a row.

As the comic strip progresses, Gaston's love for Jeanne becomes more obvious. During his office naps, his daydreams about her become increasingly explicit and erotically charged. In one of the series' final stories, Gaston and Jeanne are actually seen holding hands in public, hinting at a more intimate and serious relationship. To the dismay of critics, Franquin only sporadically actually drew them naked, with Gaston in a state of arousal, on several unpublished sketches and commercially unavailable greeting cards.

Monsieur Dupuis (the real-life publisher Jean Dupuis) himself has made two appearances - both times we only see his legs.

Spirou is also staffed by the Van Schrijfboek brothers: the mustached translator Bertje and the red-haired editor Jef, cleaning lady Mélanie Molaire (who always fumes at the mess left by Gaston and which she has to clean up), concierge Jules Soutier, and a string of attractive secretaries named Sonia (who is constantly handing in her notice), Yvonne and Suzanne. Occasionally, real-life figures from the Journal de Spirou (such as editor Yvan Delporte or writer Raoul Cauvin) have cameos.

=== Friends ===
Jules-de-chez-Smith-en-face (Jules-from-Smith's-across-the-street) is one of Gaston's friends. He "works" (much in the same way as Gaston "works") in the office just across the street from the Journal de Spirou, prompting countless attempts at cross-street communication via walkie-talkie, flash card, carrier seagull, etc. Jules shares Gaston's childish enthusiasm, and is his sidekick in many ventures. Although they are close, Jules addresses Gaston as "Lagaffe".

Bertrand Labévue is another of Gaston's friends/sidekicks, and (in translated editions) also his cousin. As his name indicates (bévue means "blunder"), he shares Gaston's tendency to goof up. Bertrand suffers from acute depression, mirroring Franquin's own problems with the illness, and Gaston and Jules do their best to cheer him up with food, country drives and other things (all of which backfire comically).

Manu is another friend, who regularly turns up in different jobs (like Bert in Mary Poppins): chimney sweep, sewer worker, installer of street signage... He also partakes in Gaston's schemes to irritate Longtarin, the policeman.

=== Foes ===
Aimé De Mesmaeker is a rich businessman; we know that he owns a private jet (until Gaston destroys it) and that his oldest daughter drives an Alfa Romeo. His precise line of business is unknown, but he is repeatedly lured into the offices of Spirou by Fantasio or Prunelle in order to sign some lucrative contracts. De Mesmaeker has developed a deep loathing for Gaston and by extension his colleagues. His frequent visits allow Franquin to satirise business rituals, as Dupuis's employees shower him with attention, complimentary drinks and cigars, but De Mesmaeker almost inevitably ends up storming out of the offices, swearing never to set foot in them again, passed out on the floor or even in hospital due to Gaston's catastrophic blunders.

De Mesmaeker is named after Jean De Mesmaeker (known as Jidéhem from the French pronunciation of his initials J.D.M.), Franquin's collaborator on the series; he remarked that the character looked like his own father. The real-life Mr De Mesmaeker Sr — actually a salesman — soon found that, as Gaston's strip became increasingly popular, concluding a deal would result in the client asking, "Where are the contracts?" (a recurring catchphrase in the comics).

Joseph Longtarin ("long nose") is a policeman working in the neighbourhood where the offices of Spirou are located. One of his particular responsibilities is to handle traffic and illegal parking. An exceptionally petty and vengeful man, he is the closest thing the series has to a villain. He is one of Gaston's favorite "victims" as well as his nemesis. The two clash continually over Gaston's car and parking habits. Gaston retaliates for Longtarin's repeated attempts to ticket him by wreaking havoc on the neighbourhood's parking meters (not just a bugbear of Gaston, but of André Franquin too). He pulls off other pranks, such as putting a small effigy of Longtarin on the front of his car, in a parody of the Rolls-Royce Spirit of Ecstasy.

Ducran & Lapoigne (“Courage & Stronghold”) is an engineering firm (specializing in steel bridges) whose offices neighbour those of Dupuis. This company is also a frequent victim of Lagaffe's mishaps and Fantasio or Prunelle often bear the brunt of Ducran and Lapoigne's anger—both of them being big muscular men, as their names suggest.

Freddy-les-doigts-de-fée ("fairy-fingered Freddy") is a burglar. His occasional break-ins at Spirou are always foiled accidentally by Gaston, who tends to inadvertently leave dangerous objects, devices or pets around the office. Workers at Spirou see Freddy as a fellow victim of Gaston, and, instead of turning him in to the police, offer him comfort and freebies when they find him in the morning.

== Props, inventions and other running gags ==
Objects play an important part in Gaston's life, and some of them have become iconic enough to be sometimes recreated in real life for exhibitions and such. The main two are:

=== Gaston's car ===
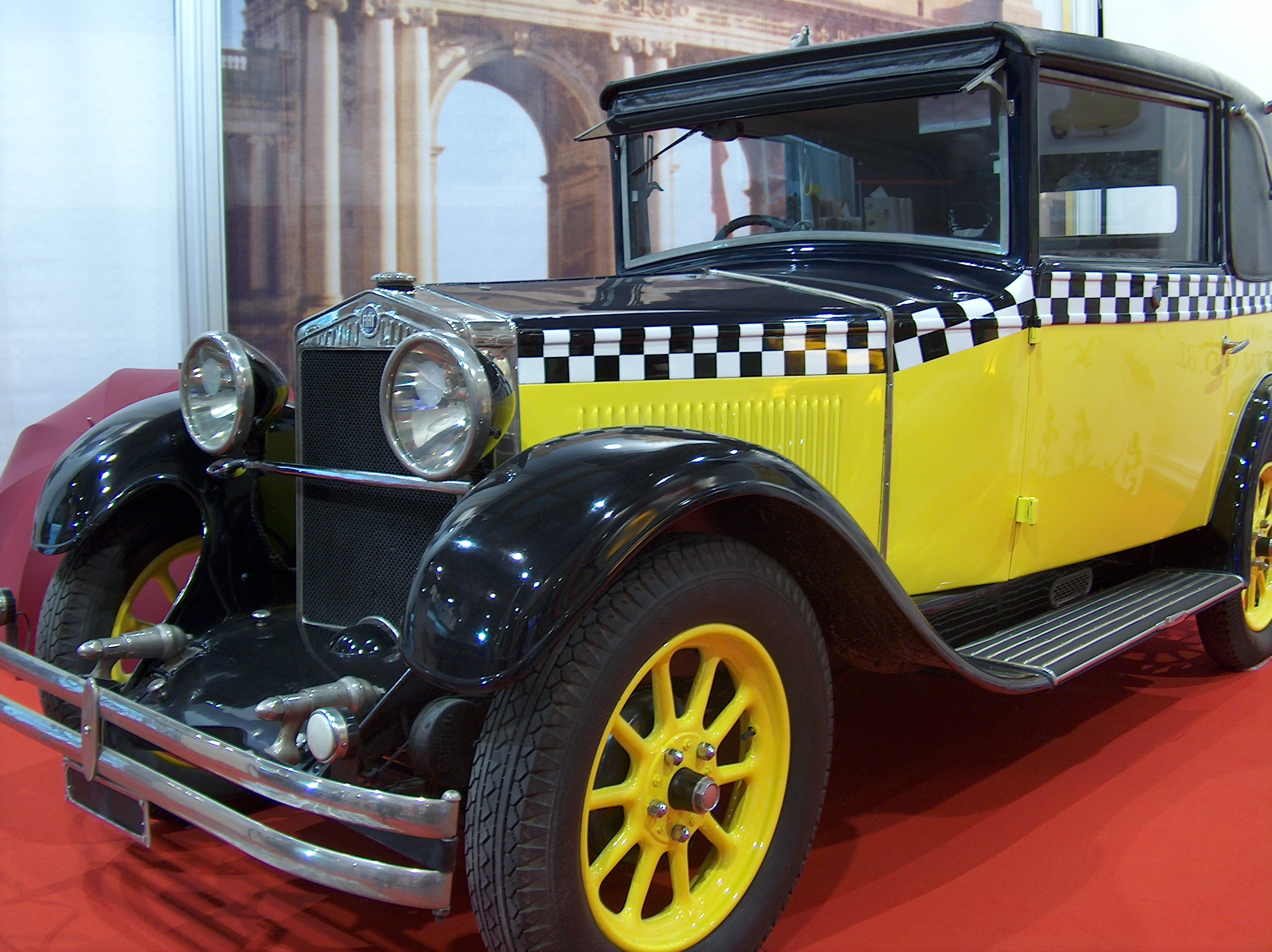
Fiat 509 at the European Motor Show Brussels 2006, decorated like Gaston's car.

Gaston drives an old Fiat 509, which he acquires in gag #321, decorated with racing patterns that he added himself. However its top speed still allows passengers to safely pick flowers on motorway verges. Much humour derives from the car's extreme state of decrepitude; for example, a friend of Gaston is able to "waterski" behind it on a slick of oil, while Gaston strenuously denies any such leaks. The car also produces huge quantities of (often toxic) smoke, even more so when Gaston converts it to run on coal. Customisations and ill-fitted upgrades include:

- An emissions filter fitted to the exhaust pipe which turns out not to let anything through, causing the exhaust to come in the front.
- A bag in which exhaust fumes are collected. Unfortunately, Gaston thoughtlessly empties the bag in a busy street, rendering everyone unconscious.
- Snow chains.
- A snow-plough device that sucks the snow into a heater, which, instead of evaporating the snow, fills the passenger compartment, freezing the occupants.
- Seatbelts, which accidentally wrap around the rear axle.
- An airbag which smothers the driver (Prunelle claims it allows a less messy death in case of accident).
- A wind turbine that peels apart the car's roof, flying away with Prunelle dangling underneath.

The car is inadvertently rocket-powered on two separate occasions.

Some of Gaston's colleagues are terrified at the very thought of sitting in the Fiat – Prunelle swears on several occasions that he will never set foot in it again. The car is also the source of many clashes with Longtarin, as Gaston endlessly devises schemes to avoid paying parking meters, even going as far as parking it up in a tree or faking roadworks.

=== The Gaffophone ===
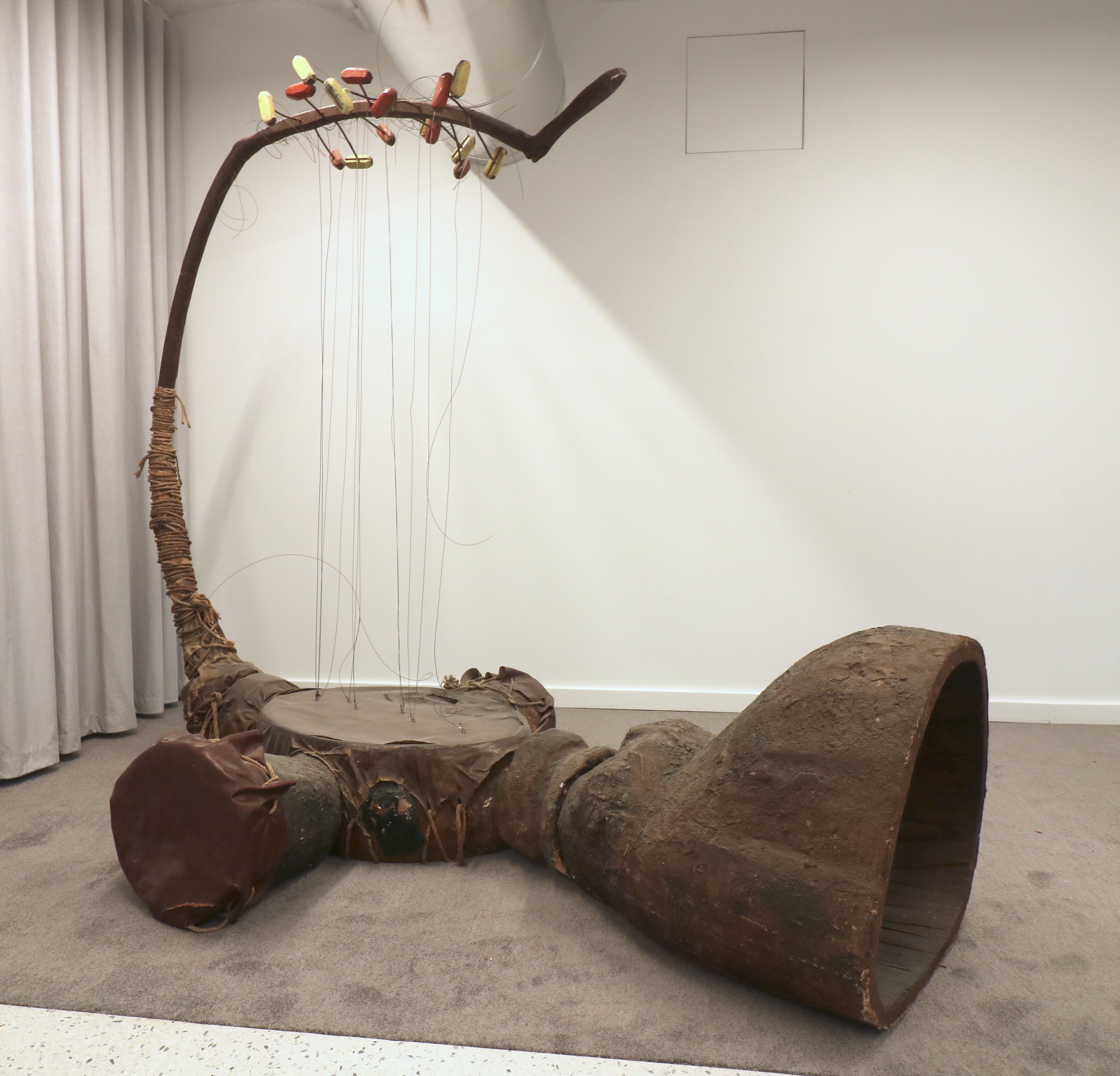
Gaffophone in the Musée des Beaux-Arts de Charleroi

This extraordinary instrument, a prehistoric-looking combination of horn and harp created by Gaston, produces a sound so terrible and loud that it causes physical destruction all around and panics animals and even fighter jet pilots. Like the voice of the bard Cacofonix in Asterix, it horrifies everyone except its originator. The first time the instrument appears, the plucking of just one string causes the ceilings of the story below to collapse. Gaston has also created at least one other instrument in the same vein, and an electric version of the Gaffophone. Fantasio has tried several times to get rid of the Gaffophone, without success.

An illustrated text published in the Journal de Spirou column En direct de la Rédaction (and later collected in Gaston nº 10), chronicled (from the viewpoint of Prunelle) the Gaffophone's blossoming and development into a small ecosystem, which then self-destructed. Gaston later rebuilt his instrument.

=== Costumes ===
An early running gag involved Gaston coming up with elaborate and extremely impractical costumes for fancy dress parties at the facetious suggestions of his colleagues: Roly-poly toy, octopus, Greek urn, petrol pump, Eiffel Tower etc. He was invariably worried about whether he would be able to dance with the outfit on. Once, he dressed as the Marsupilami.

=== Other inventions ===
These have included:

- A necktie- / shoelace-tying device, which respectively strangled Fantasio and ripped off De Mesmaeker's trousers.
- A ceiling-suspended table, which caused Fantasio to trip on the supports upstairs.
- A self-heating duffle coat, for which a plumber was called when it sprung a leak.
- A rotating Christmas tree, which ended up rotating fast enough to turn the ornaments into dangerous projectiles.
- A pneumatic ashtray, which promptly sucked in De Mesmaeker's contracts.
- An electric scarecrow, with badly insulated wires that ended up shocking the farmer.
- A folding bicycle, which promptly folded around Gaston as he was demonstrating it.
- A remote-controlled electric iron, which wreaked havoc on the office before hitting De Mesmaeker's face.
- A mini-lawnmower, to mow his aunt's lawn without hurting the daisies.
- A suit of armour for mice, for when his cat and his mouse learned to live together.
- A solar-powered flashlight.
- An electric cigar cutter shaped like a guillotine, which almost worked like a guillotine for the users' fingers.
- An automatic hammer, the inevitable "gaffe" being that you first had to nail it to the wall.
- A seatbelt made of rubber, for easy access to the mailbox from the car.
- A coffeemaker which produces so stiff a drink, it renders the drinker (Gaston himself and De Mesmaeker) hyperenergetic, agitated and utterly unable to use even a pen without destroying it.
- Adding ground coffee to the central heating boiler, so that hot coffee can be extracted from every radiator in the building, but with a flavour of heating oil.
- A tanning umbrella, to tan when it is raining. It gives Gaston a sunburn in the middle of rainy, cold weather.
- A perpetual motion machine that serves no purpose than to annoy the rest of the office.

=== The mail backlog ===
The task most often given to Gaston by Prunelle is to sort and answer the mail, presumably sent by readers. This often builds up to a mountain-like backlog, which Gaston often attempts to dispose of in creative ways, for instance stuffing a homemade sofa with it. In a similar vein, Gaston was briefly put in charge of the reference library: at first he arranged the books into a maze and charged his colleagues for admission, and later he simply piled them up, dug a cave in the middle and settled there with his pets, a radio and a stove to sleep all day.

=== De Mesmaeker's contracts ===
This is possibly the most frequent running gag in the series, and by Franquin's admission a MacGuffin: "Whatever's in the contracts is irrelevant. What we want to see is how Gaston will prevent them from being signed."

Aimé De Mesmaeker is a hot-tempered businessman who often visits the office (which he increasingly, and with some justification, sees as a madhouse) in order to sign some important contracts. However, the contracts are irrevocably jinxed: before De Mesmaeker can apply pen to paper, Gaston's latest gimmick comes along, provokes mayhem and causes the hapless businessman to storm out, rip the contracts up, or in some cases pass out. Even when they do get signed, Gaston can always be counted on to accidentally destroy them.

Over the years, Fantasio and Prunelle's efforts to get the iconic contracts signed become increasingly frantic and desperate. Prunelle even goes so far as to send Lagaffe to the other side of town on some wild goose chase or bound and gag him and lock him into a cupboard but even these drastic measures backfire and fail.

On two occasions, De Mesmaeker actually ended up signing other contracts with Gaston spontaneously, instead of the contracts, both merchandising deals over Gaston's inventions (the "Cosmo-clock", an Apollo spacecraft-shaped cuckoo clock, and a soup recipe).

== Politics, activism and promotional material ==
Authors at Spirou could only go so far in expressing anything resembling politics within the magazine, and so the author of Gaston generally stuck to a gentle satire of productivity and authority. However, the pacifism and concern for the environment that formed the basis of Franquin's politics and would be expressed much more bluntly in Idées noires were already surfacing in Gaston (and Spirou et Fantasio). Very occasionally, Franquin stepped over the mark, as in an uncharacteristically angry strip where Gaston uses a toy Messerschmitt plane to strafe the whole office in protest at their (real life) appearance in the magazine's modelling column (while building the model, he says: “… and now, the swastikas. They are very popular amongst idiots”). Outside of Spirou however, Franquin had a free rein, and used Gaston in promotional material for diverse organisations such as Greenpeace and Amnesty International. In the former, activists scare whales away from whalers by plucking the dreaded gaffophone. For the latter, Franquin produced a gut-wrenching sequence where Gaston is beaten and tortured and forced to watch M'oiselle Jeanne raped in front of him, before being sent to a prison camp. In the penultimate frame he faces capital punishment which the punters hope "serves as an example". Awaking in a sweat, Gaston shouts at the reader that "although this was a nightmare, it's happening right now around the world", urging membership.

Gaston has also appeared in advertising campaigns for batteries, a soft drink (Orange Piedboeuf), and in a campaign to promote bus use. The material was always drawn by Franquin himself rather than under licence, and has been reprinted in books. The latter campaign is interesting in that it shows Franquin's evolution from car enthusiast inventing the Turbo-traction and other fancy sports vehicles for Spirou in the 1950s, to disillusioned citizen concerned over traffic and pollution in later years. One topical strip had the seagull boycotting Gaston's car after seeing a bird stuck in an oil spill on television. "Life is becoming more and more complicated", its owner concludes gloomily in a very rare joke-free ending.

== Albums ==
In 1960 the first Gaston book, a small-format (7x13 cm) publication, was released. Its format was so unorthodox that some retailers thought it was a promotional issue to be given away for free. The cover features Gaston wearing orange espadrilles without socks, not yet given his trademark blue espadrilles. Fifteen major albums were published between 1963 and 1996, including all the strips that appeared in Spirou. There were some oddities such as number 1 appearing out of sequence and number 0 twenty years later. The first five were quickly sold out; the others were frequently reprinted.

Included in the series were the "R1" through "R5" albums (R for Réédition, French for republication). The R5 album was not published until 1986; its non-existence until then had been a mystery. This was due to the republication of the real first five books: they were published on a smaller format, and from these small ones they couldn't make five big ones. After several years it was decided to fill it up with early unpublished material and some advertising gags for PiedBœuf.

Beginning in 1987, Éditions J'ai lu began publishing a 17-volume series in paperback format. The titles and contents did not exactly match the large-format albums.

In 1996, upon Gaston's 40th anniversary, Dupuis and Marsu Productions published Edition Définitive, containing nearly all Gaston gags in chronological order. As some of the earliest material had been damaged, restoration work was done by Studio Léonardo, with the results approved by Franquin. This edition is being published in Spain by Planeta DeAgostini Comics starting in January 2007.

In 2007, upon Gaston's 50th anniversary, Marsu Productions published Gaston 50, a new album with unpublished work. The strange number 50 refers to Gaston's age but also to the chaotic numbering of the Classic series, which hadn't got a number five for a very long time.

Delaf approached Franquin's drawing style and was asked to work on a new Gaston album in 2021

For an anniversary album of sixty years of Gaston in 2016, Canadian illustrator Delaf illustrated the cover and drew a gag. This was so well received that he was asked to work on a completely new album. In 2023, 26 years after Franquin's death, the new album Gaston 22: Le Retour de Lagaffe! was released.

n°	Title	Year^{[a]}	Pages	Format	Content^{[b]}	Period ^{[a]}	Authors
Série classique, Classic series
0	Gaston	1960	49	19,7 x 8,3 cm	new	1960	Franquin, Jidehem
1	Gare aux gaffes	1966	64	22 x 15 cm	new (strips 294 - 351)	1959–1966	Franquin, Jidehem
2	Gala de gaffes	1963	64	22 x 15 cm	new (strips 49 - 151)	1962	Franquin, Jidehem
3	Gaffes à gogo	1964	64	22 x 15 cm	new (strips 144 - 210)	1964	Franquin, Jidehem
4	Gaffes en gros	1965	64	22 x 15 cm	new (strips 215 - 286)	1965	Franquin, Jidehem
5	Les gaffes d'un gars gonflé	1967	64	22 x 15 cm	new (strips 350 - 410)	1967	Franquin, Jidehem
6	Des gaffes et des dégâts	1968	59	21,8 x 30 cm	new (strips 413 - 480)	1968	Franquin
7	Un gaffeur sachant gaffer	1969	59	21,8 x 30 cm	new (strips 472 - 543)	1969	Franquin
8	Lagaffe nous gâte	1970	59	21,8 x 30 cm	new (strips 544 - 607)	1970	Franquin
9	Le cas Lagaffe	1971	52	21,8 x 30 cm	new (strips 601 - 658)	1971	Franquin
10	Le géant de la gaffe	1972	52	21,8 x 30 cm	new (strips 659 - 714)	1972	Franquin
11	Gaffes, bévues et boulettes	1973	44	21,8 x 30 cm	new (strips 715 - 849)	1972	Franquin
12	Le gang des gaffeurs	1974	44	21,8 x 30 cm	new (strips 759 - 805)	1974	Franquin
13	Lagaffe mérite des baffes	1979	46	21,8 x 30 cm	new (strips 806 - 850)	1975–1979	Franquin
14	La saga des gaffes	1982	44	21,8 x 30 cm	new (strips 851 - 890)	1980–1982	Franquin
15	Gaffe à Lagaffe !	1996	45	21,8 x 30 cm	new and unpublished	1987–1996	Franquin
16	Gaston 19	1999	44	21,8 x 30 cm	new and unpublished	1957–1997	Franquin
17	Gaston 50	2007	44	21,8 x 30 cm	new and unpublished	1957–1997	Franquin
18	Lagaffe rebondit	2018	48	21,8 x 30 cm	new and unpublished	1957–1997	Franquin
19	Ultimes béuves	2018	44	21,8 x 30 cm	new and unpublished	1957–1997	Franquin
20	Le retour de Lagaffe	2023	44	21,8 x 30 cm	new	1957–1997	Delaf
(R) Réédition series
R0	Gaffes et gadgets	1985	46	21,8 x 30 cm	unpublished	1957	Franquin, Delporte
R1	Gala de gaffes à gogo	1970	59	21,8 x 30 cm	albums 2 & 3	1963	Franquin, Jidehem
R2	Le bureau des gaffes en gros	1972	52	21,8 x 30 cm	album 4 & unpublished	1965	Franquin, Jidehem
R3	Gare aux gaffes du gars gonflé	1973	52	21,8 x 30 cm	album 1 & 5	1959–1966	Franquin, Jidehem
R4	En direct de la gaffe	1974	44	21,8 x 30 cm	unpublished	1960–1968	Franquin, Delporte
R5	Le lourd passé de Lagaffe	1986	46	21,8 x 30 cm	unpublished	1957–1982	Franquin, Jidehem

^{[a]} year the comics book was published in album, as opposed to the period during which the strips were published in Spirou magazine.
^{[b]} "new" refers to an album whose strips had been published in magazine one or some years earlier (with the numero of the strips), while "unpublished" means the album is a collection of unrelated strips never published in albums prior. "album" means the album is a republication.

=== Other publications ===
- Biographie d'un gaffeur (1965) Franquin & Jidéhem, Gag de poche n°26
- La fantastica Fiat 509 di Gaston Lagaffe (1977)
- Gaston et le Marsupilami (1978, ISBN 2-8001-0637-9)
- Les Robinsons du rail (1981, ISBN 2-903403-05-8) An illustrated story album (not a comic) featuring Gaston, Spirou and Fantasio
- Fou du Bus (1987, ISBN 2-906452-01-7) Advert album commissioned by the Union of Public Transportations
- Rempile et désopile (1989) Advertising gags for Philips, only printed in 2500 editions
- Le facteur est mon ami (1992) Advertising for the Belgian Post
- Gaston 50 (2007, ISBN 2-35426-000-8) Edition for Gaston's 50th birthday with unpublished work

=== Translations ===
The albums are translated and published in different countries, either by Dupuis (Croatia, Denmark, Spain, Italy, Netherlands, Portugal and Serbia), or by other publishers. The character's name changes in some languages (regional languages are shown in italic).

- Alsatian: Gaston Bock
- Basque: Gaston Lagaffe
- Breton: Gaston Beiadeg
- Catalan: Sergi Grapes
- Corsican: Gastone Lagaffe
- Czech: Gaston
- Danish: Vakse Viggo
- Dutch: Guust Flater
- English: Gomer Goof
- Esperanto: Gastono Lafuŝo
- Finnish: Niilo Pielinen
- German: Gaston, without surname
- Greek: Gaston
- Icelandic: Viggó Viðutan
- Italian: Gaston
- Norwegian: Viggo
- Occitan: Gaston Cofa
- Polish: Gaston
- Portuguese: Gastão Dabronca
- Russian: Гастон (Gaston)
- Savoyard: Gust Leniolu
- Serbian: Гаша шепртља (Gaša šeprtlja)
- Spanish: Tomás Elgafe
- Swedish: Gaston
- Turkish: Chapchal Gazi (Şapşal Gazi)
- Walloon: Gaston Libiestreye

=== English translations ===
The first known English translations of Gaston strips were published in 1970 in the United Kingdom. Four Gaston strips were published as Cranky Franky in the Thunderbirds Annual 1971. Gaston was renamed "Cranky Franky", and Fantasio was simply referred to as "Boss".

In the early 1990s, American publisher Fantagraphics translated about a half a dozen gags into English. Gaston was rechristened "Gomer Goof" in this version.

British publisher Cinebook began publishing full albums in English in July 2017, under the same name used by Fantagraphics, Gomer Goof.

== Tributes and pastiches ==
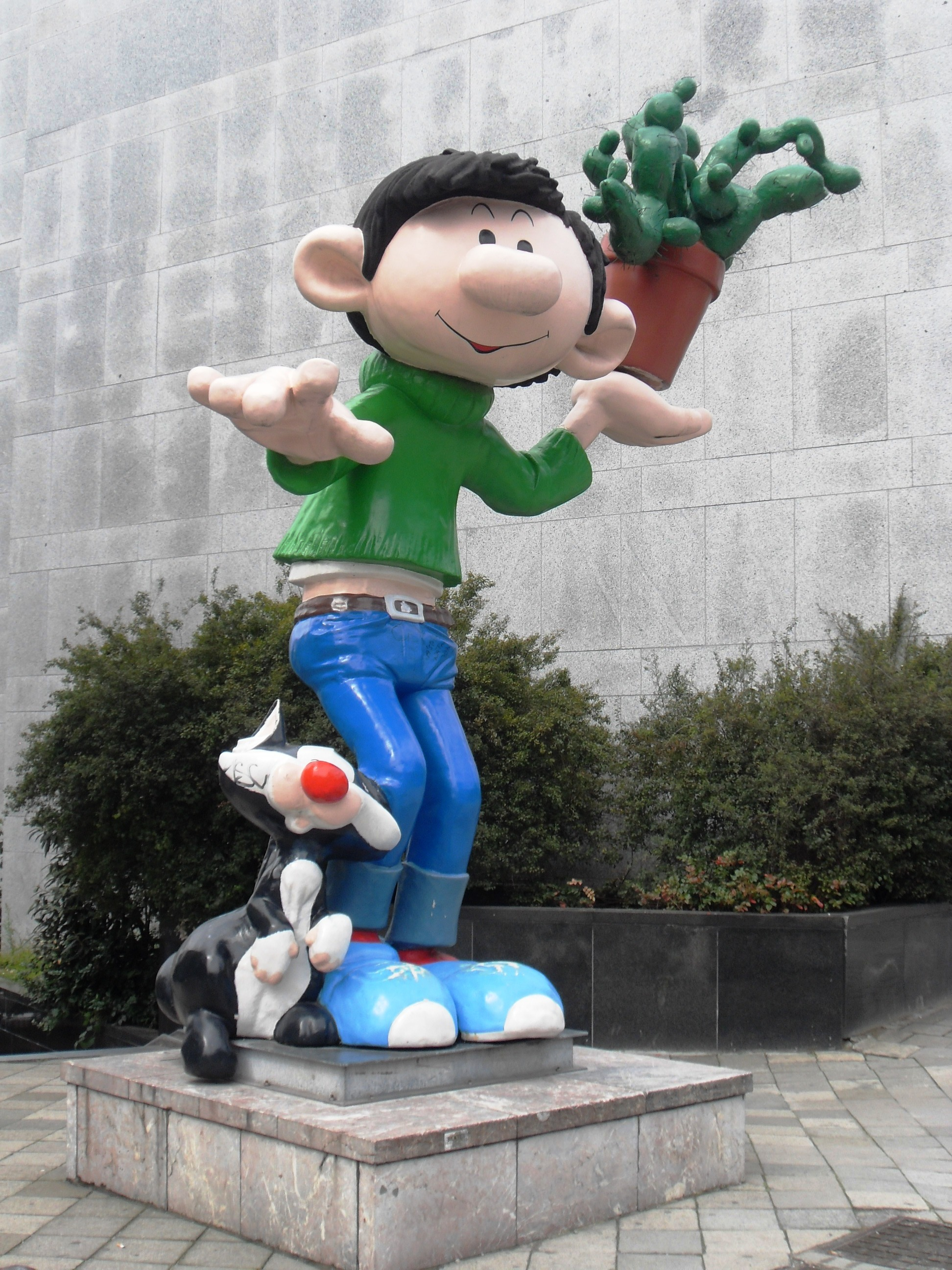
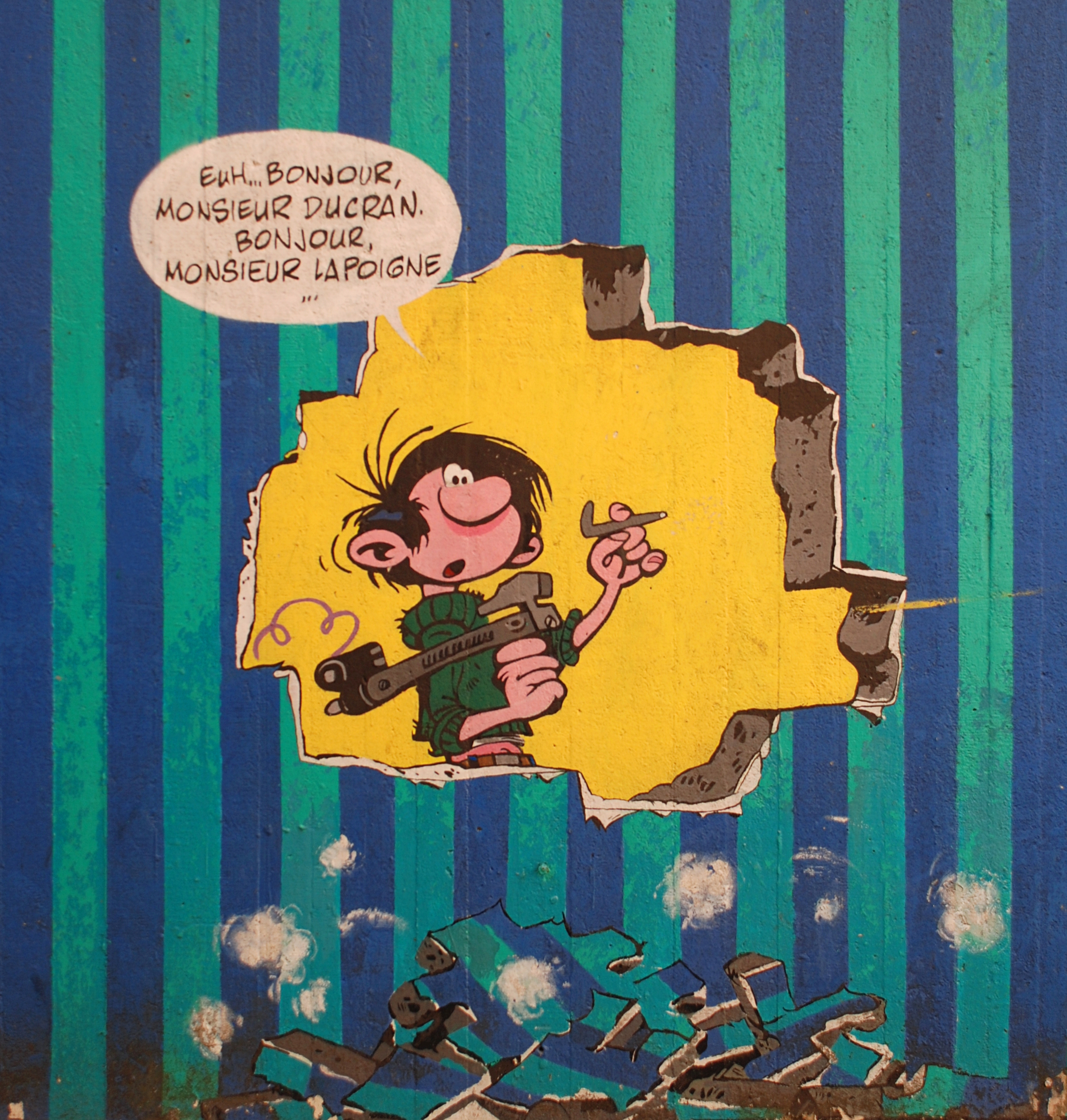
Monument in Brussels and mural painting in Louvain-la-Neuve
- Issue no 3672 of Spirou magazine was conceived as a tribute to the series, with tributes and parodies being drawn by artists such as Yoann, Olivier Schwartz, Lewis Trondheim, Fabrice Tarrin etc.
- In the Belgian Comic Strip Center in Brussels the permanent exhibition brings homage to the pioneers of Belgian comics, among them André Franquin. One of the rooms dedicated to his comics is a replica of Gaston's office.
- Gaston Lagaffe is among the many Belgian comics characters to jokingly have a Brussels street named after them. The Rue du Marché aux Herbes / Grasmarkt has a commemorative plaque with the name Rue Gaston Lagaffe / Guust Flaterstraat placed under the actual street sign.
- A statue of Gaston Lagaffe was erected in 1996 in the Boulevard Pachéco, Rue des Sables / Pachécolaan, Zandstraat in Brussels.
- There is also a wall, part of the Brussels' Comic Book Route, designed in homage to the comics. The comic book wall was designed in 2007 in the Rue de l'Écuyer / Schildknaapstraat.
- A mural painting represents Gaston Lagaffe in the rue des Wallons in Louvain-la-Neuve, based on an original painting by Franquin.
- Between approximately 1990 and 2008, there was also a painting of Gaston at the East Side Gallery in Berlin. It was unauthorized and not an official part of the gallery but was a popular photo motive.
- In honor of Gaston's 60th birthday, Manneken Pis wore a suit from Guust Flater during the Brussels Comics Festival in 2017.
- In Charleroi, a statue of Gaston was unveiled on Place Verte on September 17, 2021.

== Film adaptations ==
Gaston Lagaffe (2018) movie poster

In 1981, a live-action French film based on Gaston, called Fais gaffe à la gaffe! directed by Paul Boujenah and starring Roger Mirmont. Future The Sopranos star Lorraine Bracco, then residing in France, appears in a supporting role. Franquin, uncomfortable with the prospect of a live adaptation of Gaston, had given permission for the elements and jokes from his work to be used, but not the actual characters. As a result, the characters' names were all changed, making the film appear more like an imitation than a proper adaptation.

In 2009, an animated series of Gaston was broadcast from November 19, created by Normaal Studios. Unable to draw the characters, the animation style were first taken from the actual comic and then animated. This was done to express the feeling of the characters coming to life from the comics. This technique also uses actual shown speech bubbles, panels and even written sound effects. Each episode centered around a different theme and showed about 5 gags similar, from the including Cup-and-ball, experiments, the cactus, pets, etc..

A new adaptation with Théo Fernandez as the titular character, this time called Gaston Lagaffe, made by and co-starring Pierre-François Martin-Laval was released in 2018.

== See also ==
- Le Monde's 100 Books of the Century
- Marcinelle school
- Belgian comics
- Franco-Belgian comics

== Sources ==
- Franquin publications in Le Journal de Spirou BDoubliées (in French)
- Gaston appearances in Le Journal de Spirou gastonlagaffe.com (in French)
- Sadoul, Numa; André Franquin (1986). Et Franquin créa la gaffe. Distri B.D. ISBN 2-87178-000-5.
