= Des gaffes et des dégâts =

Gaston Lagaffe #6 Des gaffes et des dégâts
- Cover of the Belgian edition
- Date: 1968
- Series: Gaston Lagaffe
- Publisher: Dupuis

Creative team
- Writers: Franquin
- Artists: Franquin

Original publication
- Published in: Spirou magazine
- Date of publication: 1967
- Language: French
- ISBN: 2-8001-0088-5

Chronology
- Preceded by: Les gaffes d'un gars gonflé, 1967
- Followed by: Un gaffeur sachant gaffer, 1969

Des gaffes et des dégâts, written and drawn by Franquin, is the sixth album of the original Gaston Lagaffe series. The 59 strips of this album were previously published in Spirou magazine.

== Story ==
In this album, Bertrand Labévue and the Gaffophone appear for the first time. Most of the gags are caused by the instrument.

=== Inventions ===
- filter for gases: to be placed on the exhaust pipe of one's car to prevent CO_{2} emissions
- a rocket to modify the weather: rocket full of explosive, but inefficient
- quick floor polisher: consists of an old fire extinguisher.
- table : a table camping which can fold automatically, thank to a small button situated at the center of the table, which can cause some unexpected and accidents

== Background ==
This is the first Gaston Lagaffe album published in the usual Franco-Belgian album format (21,8 x 30 cm).
