= Jean-Claude Fournier =

French cartoonist

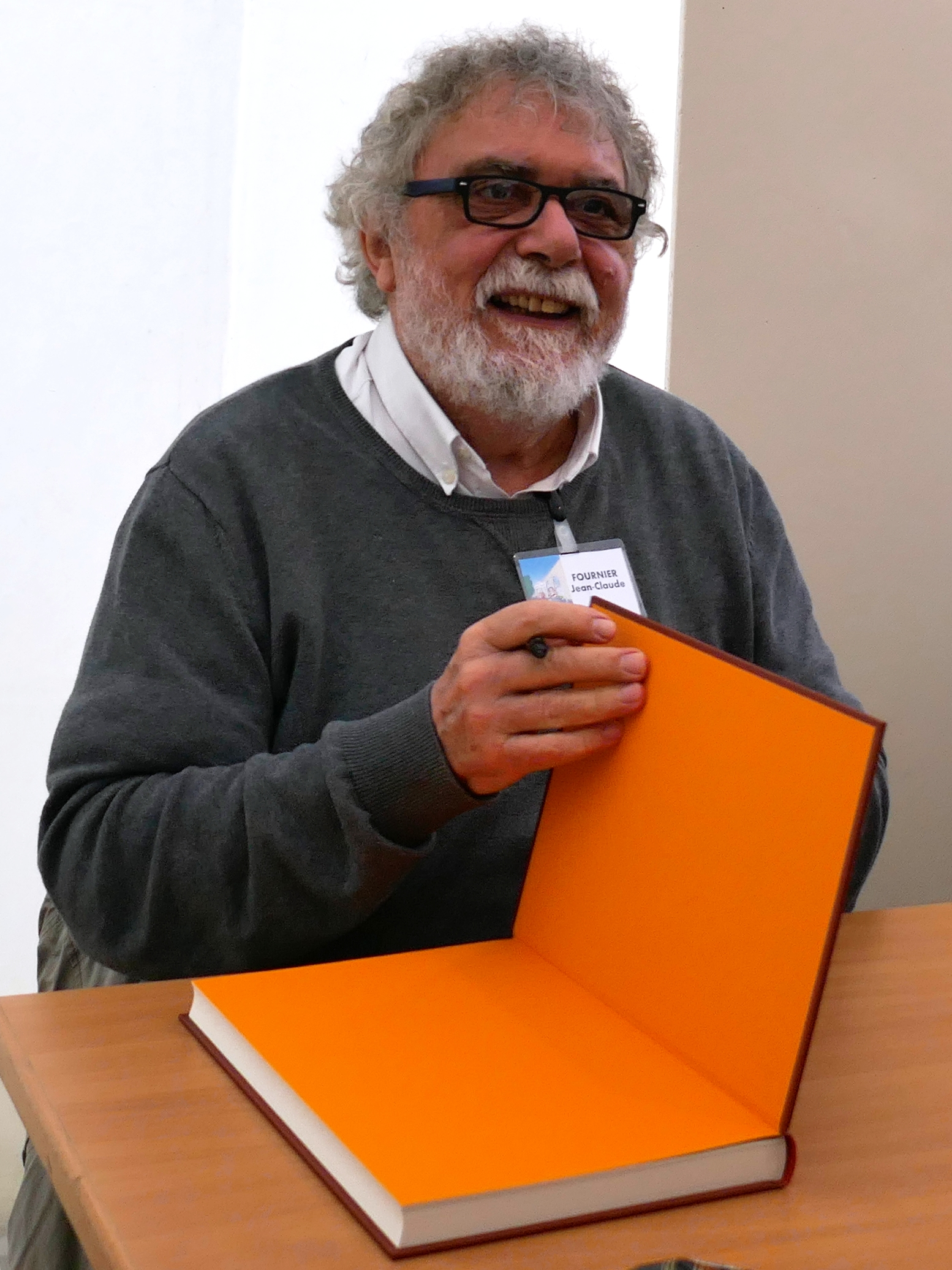
- Jean-Claude Fournier in 2017
- Born: Jean-Claude Fournier; 21 May 1943 (age 83) Paris, France
- Areas: artist, writer
- Notable works: Spirou et Fantasio; Bizu

Jean-Claude Fournier (French: [fuʁnje]; born 21 May 1943), known simply as Fournier, is a French cartoonist best known as the comic book artist who handled Spirou et Fantasio in the years 1969–1979.

== Biography ==
Fournier was born in Paris. In 1965, Fournier approached André Franquin with drawings of his favourite characters, the cast of Spirou. As Franquin sought a way to retire as Spirou creator, and devote himself to Gaston Lagaffe, he passed on Fournier's work to Yvan Delporte, the editor of Spirou magazine. Fournier's own creation; the poetic and fairy tale-like Bizu was serialised in Spirou between 1967 and 1969, until Fournier was finally chosen by Dupuis as Franquin's successor. The first story was Le faiseur d'or which first appeared in Spirou on 29 May 1969. Fournier added his personal poetic and environmentalistic mark to the saga.

In 1979, after nine feature stories, he decided to leave the project and devote himself to Bizu. Spirou et Fantasio was eventually continued by Nic and Cauvin, In 1998 Fournier launched Les Crannibales, a cannibal-based humour comics series based on scripts by Zidrou.

== Bibliography ==
Tora Torapa (1973) by Fournier

- Spirou et Fantasio, Dupuis
  - 20. Le faiseur d'or (The Gold Maker, 1970)
  - 21. Du glucose pour Noémie (Glucose for Noémie, 1971)
  - 22. L'abbaye truquée (The Disguised Abbey, 1972)
  - 23. Tora Torapa (1973)
  - 25. Le gri-gri du Niokolo-Koba (The gris-gris of Niokolo-Koba, 1974)
  - 26. Du cidre pour les étoiles (Cider for the Stars, 1977)
  - 27. L'Ankou (The Ankou, 1978)
  - 28. Kodo le tyran (Kodo the Tyrant, 1979)
  - 29. Des haricots partout (Beans Everywhere, 1980)
- Bizu
  - 0. Bonjour Bizu (1982, Dupuis)
  - 1. Le signe d'Ys (1986, Fleurus)
  - 2. Le fils de Fa Dièse (1986, Fleurus)
  - 3. Le chevalier potage (1990, Dupuis)
  - 4. Le trio Jabadao (1991, Dupuis)
  - 5. La croisière fantôme (1992, Dupuis)
  - 6. La houle aux loups (1994, Dupuis)
- Les Crannibales, Dupuis
  - 1. A table! (1998)
  - 2. On mange qui, ce soir? (1999)
  - 3. Pour qui sonne le gras? (1999)
  - 4. L'aile ou la cuisse? (2000)
  - 5. Crannibal pursuit (2001)
  - 6. Abracada...Miam! (2002)
  - 7. Crunch! (2003)
  - 8. Pêche au gros (2005)
- Les Chevaux du vent, Dupuis
  - 1. Première partie (2008)

== Sources ==
- Fournier publications in Spirou BDoubliées (in French)
- Fournier albums Bedetheque (in French)
