= Gala de gaffes à gogo =

Gaston Lagaffe #R1 Gala de gaffes à gogo
- Cover of the Belgian edition
- Date: 1970
- Series: Gaston Lagaffe
- Publisher: Dupuis

Creative team
- Writers: Franquin
- Artists: Franquin Jidéhem

Original publication
- Published in: Spirou
- Language: French
- ISBN: 2-8001-0093-1

Chronology
- Followed by: Le bureau des gaffes en gros

Gala de gaffes à gogo, written and drawn by Franquin and Jidéhem, is an album of the original Gaston Lagaffe series, numbered R1. It is made up of 59 pages and was published by Dupuis. It consists of a series of one-strip gags.

== Story ==
Monsieur De Mesmeaker appear for the first time and try to sign contracts, in vain. The Gaston-Latex also appear, causing running gags. Finally, Prunelle and Lebrac appear at the end of the album, but they do not play an important role as yet, and most strips feature only Fantasio and Gaston.

=== Inventions ===
- electric hammer: it must be fixed to the wall
- rubber chair: chair that collapse when someone sits on it
- Gaston Latex: rubber replica of Gaston
- Mastigaston: saves someone from chewing before swallowing foods

== Background ==
This album was first published in the Italian format. As these albums were sold out, Dupuis decided to reprint it at the common Franco-Belgian album format. This album is made up of the original albums numbered 2 and 3. It was numbered R1 to distinguish it from the album #1, "R" being a French abbreviation for "réédition" (re-publication).
