= Franquin's Last Laugh =

Collection of black comedy comic strips

Idées Noires
- Cover of Idées noires l'integrale
- Date: 1981, 1984
- Publisher: Fluide Glacial

Creative team
- Writers: Franquin and Yvan Delporte
- Artists: Franquin with Jean Roba

Original publication
- Published in: Le Trombone illustré in Le Journal de Spirou
- Issues: 1. 2031 - #2035, #2037 - #2040, #2049, #2057, #2061
- Date of publication: 1977
- Language: French
- ISBN: 978-2858152957 (Idées noires l'integrale)

Franquin's Last Laugh (French: Idées noires: Dark thoughts) is a collection of black comedy comic strips drawn by André Franquin, written by Franquin and Yvan Delporte. The one-page stories first appeared frequently in 1977, in the brief run of the Spirou magazine supplement, Le Trombone illustré. After this initiative was cancelled, Idées noires resumed publication in the magazine Fluide Glacial, upon Gotlib's suggestion, where it remained a fixture until 1983. The first album was published in 1981, and a sequel in half-page format was published in 1984.

As the title Idées noires might suggest, these stories explore depressive and horrific fantasies, all drawn with dramatic use of black on white. Suicide, execution, industrial recklessness, ecological disaster and hunting accidents are some of the themes darkly illustrated in this body of work. It's also notable for its stances against nuclear energy, the death penalty, game hunting and war. The series contrasts sharply with Franquin's other comic strips such as Gaston Lagaffe, Spirou et Fantasio and the Marsupilami, although a dark touch occasionally surfaced in other later work such as the Gaston Lagaffe strip for Amnesty International (published in Cauchemarrants, 1979).

A few pages were translated in Kitchen Sink's short-lived comics magazine "French Ticklers" under the title "Dark Designs". The whole collection was set to be published by Fantagraphics Books in an English translation by Kim Thompson in 2013, but publication has been delayed, possibly because of Thompson's death to cancer. It was finally published in 2018 under the title "Die Laughing".

== Publications ==
- Idées noires (1981)
- Idées noires 2 (1984, half-page (21.8x15cm) publication)
- Idées noires, l'intégrale (2001, complete collection)
- Die Laughing (2018, complete collection in English)

== In popular culture ==
In the Belgian Comic Strip Center in Brussels the permanent exhibition brings homage to the pioneers of Belgian comics, among them André Franquin. One of the rooms dedicated to his work is a black, dark tunnel where pages from "Idéés Noires" are exhibited.

== Sources ==
- Idées noires publications in Spirou Archived 2007-02-02 at the Wayback Machine and Fluide Glacial Archived 2007-05-25 at the Wayback Machine BDoubliées (in French)
- Idées noires album publications Bedetheque (in French)

Footnotes
