= Des haricots partout =

Spirou et Fantasio #29 Des haricots partout
- Cover of the Belgian edition
- Date: 1980
- Series: Spirou et Fantasio
- Publisher: Dupuis

Creative team
- Writers: Fournier
- Artists: Fournier

Original publication
- Published in: Spirou magazine
- Issues: 1. 2149 - #2162
- Date of publication: 1979
- Language: French
- ISBN: 2-8001-0700-6

Chronology
- Preceded by: Kodo le tyran, 1979
- Followed by: La ceinture du grand froid, 1983

Des haricots partout, written and drawn by Fournier, is the twenty-ninth Spirou et Fantasio series album, and the author's ninth and final contribution to the series. The story was serialised in Spirou magazine before it was released as a hardcover album in 1980.

== Story ==
In Beans Everywhere, the attack on the bridge of Pagor Tevat fails, fortunately. Fantasio is therefore able to inspect Kuor-Lamb and collect information on the way that the harvests of Kodo function. Spirou manages to contact him thanks to the pigeon of Prabang; the rebels attempt to remove Spirou from the scene. United at last, Fantasio and Spirou develop a plan to overthrow the dictator. Benefiting from Matteo's departure, the rebels leave Spirou the country; this brings the Count de Champignac back in line with their cause. With the assistance of the WHO, where the Count has relations, they finally manage to unseat the dictator, who then flees the country.
