= André Franquin =

Belgian comics artist (1924–1997)

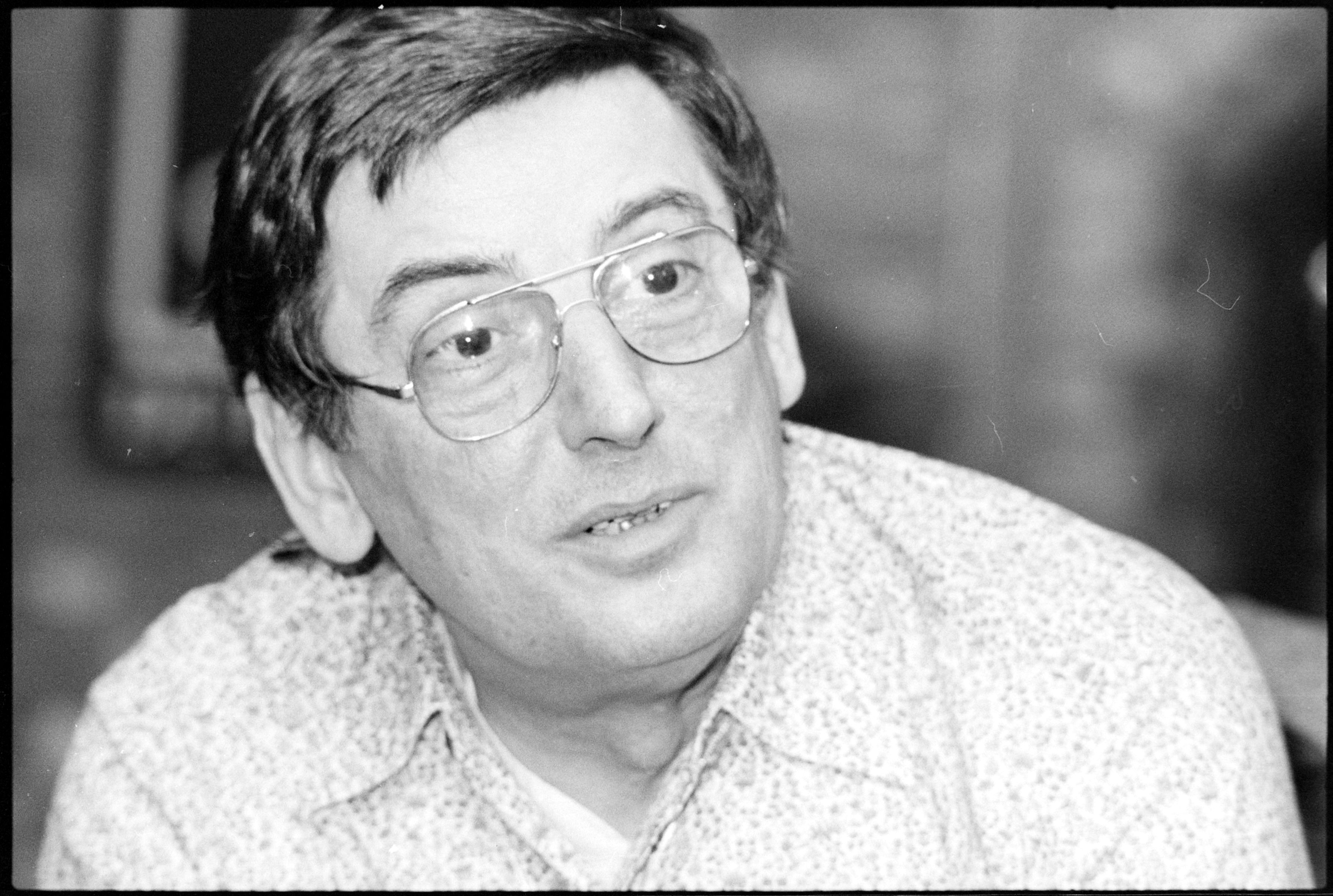
- Franquin in 1979
- Born: 3 January 1924 Etterbeek, Belgium
- Died: 5 January 1997 (aged 73) Saint-Laurent-du-Var, France
- Areas: Writer, Artist
- Notable works: Spirou et Fantasio; Modest et Pompon; Gaston; Idées noires Marsupilami
- Awards: Full list

André Franquin (French: [fʁɑ̃kɛ̃]; 3 January 1924 – 5 January 1997) was an influential Belgian comics artist, whose best-known creations are Gaston and Marsupilami. He also produced the Spirou et Fantasio comic strip from 1946 to 1968, a period seen by many as the series' golden age.

== Biography ==
=== Franquin's beginnings ===
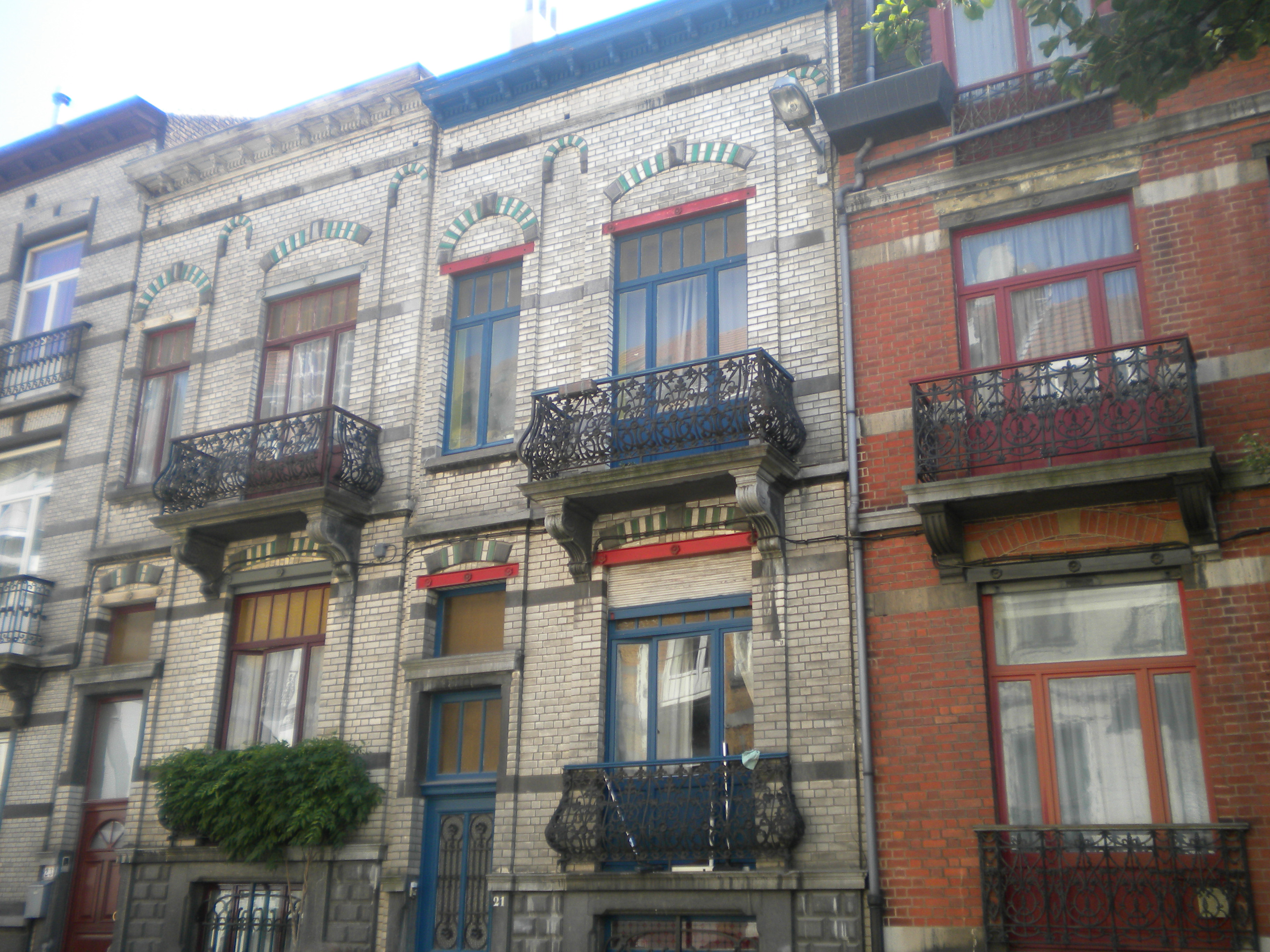
Franquin's family home in Ixelles

Franquin was born in Etterbeek in 1924. Although he started drawing at an early age, Franquin got his first actual drawing lessons at École Saint-Luc in 1943. A year later, however, the school was forced to close down because of the war and Franquin was then hired by Compagnie belge d'actualités (CBA), a short-lived animation studio in Brussels. It is there he met some of his future colleagues: Maurice de Bevere (Morris, creator of Lucky Luke), Pierre Culliford (Peyo, creator of the Smurfs), and Eddy Paape. Three of them (minus Peyo) were hired by Dupuis in 1945, following CBA's demise. Peyo, still too young, would only follow them seven years later. Franquin started drawing covers and cartoons for Le Moustique, a weekly magazine about radio and culture. He also worked for Plein Jeu, a monthly scouting magazine.

During this time, Morris and Franquin were coached by Joseph Gillain (Jijé), who had transformed a section of his house into a workspace for the two young comics artists and Will. Jijé was then producing many of the comics that were published in the Franco-Belgian comics magazine Spirou, including its flagship series Spirou et Fantasio. The team he had assembled at the end of the war is often referred to as La bande des quatre (lit. "The Gang of Four"), and the graphical style they would develop together was later called the Marcinelle school, Marcinelle being an outskirt of the industrial city of Charleroi south of Brussels where Spirou's publisher Dupuis was then situated.

Jijé passed the Spirou et Fantasio strip to Franquin, five pages into the making of Spirou et la maison préfabriquée, and from Spirou issue #427 released 20 June 1946, the young Franquin held creative responsibility of the series. For the next twenty years, Franquin largely reinvented the strip, creating longer, more elaborate storylines and a large gallery of burlesque characters.

Most notable among these is the Marsupilami, a fictional monkey-like creature. The inspiration for the Marsupilami's extremely long, prehensile tail came from imagining an appendage for the busy tramway conductors Franquin and his colleagues often encountered on their way to work. This animal has become part of Belgian and French popular culture and has spawned cartoons, merchandise, and since 1989 a comic book series of its own. The cartoons have broadened their appeal to English-speaking countries.

=== Mid period ===
By 1951, Franquin had found his style. His strip, that appeared every week on the first page of Spirou, was a hit. Following Jijé's lead in the 1940s, Franquin coached a younger generation of comics artists in the 1950s, notably Jean Roba and Jidéhem, who both worked with him on Spirou et Fantasio.

In 1955, following a contractual dispute with his publisher Dupuis, Franquin went for a short stint at rival Tintin magazine. This led to the creation of Modeste et Pompon, a gag series which included contributions from René Goscinny (of Astérix fame) and Peyo. Franquin later returned to Spirou, but his contractual commitment to Tintin meant that he had to contribute to both magazines, an unusual arrangement in the comic industry. The series was later passed on to authors such as Dino Attanasio and Mittéï (Jean Mariette).

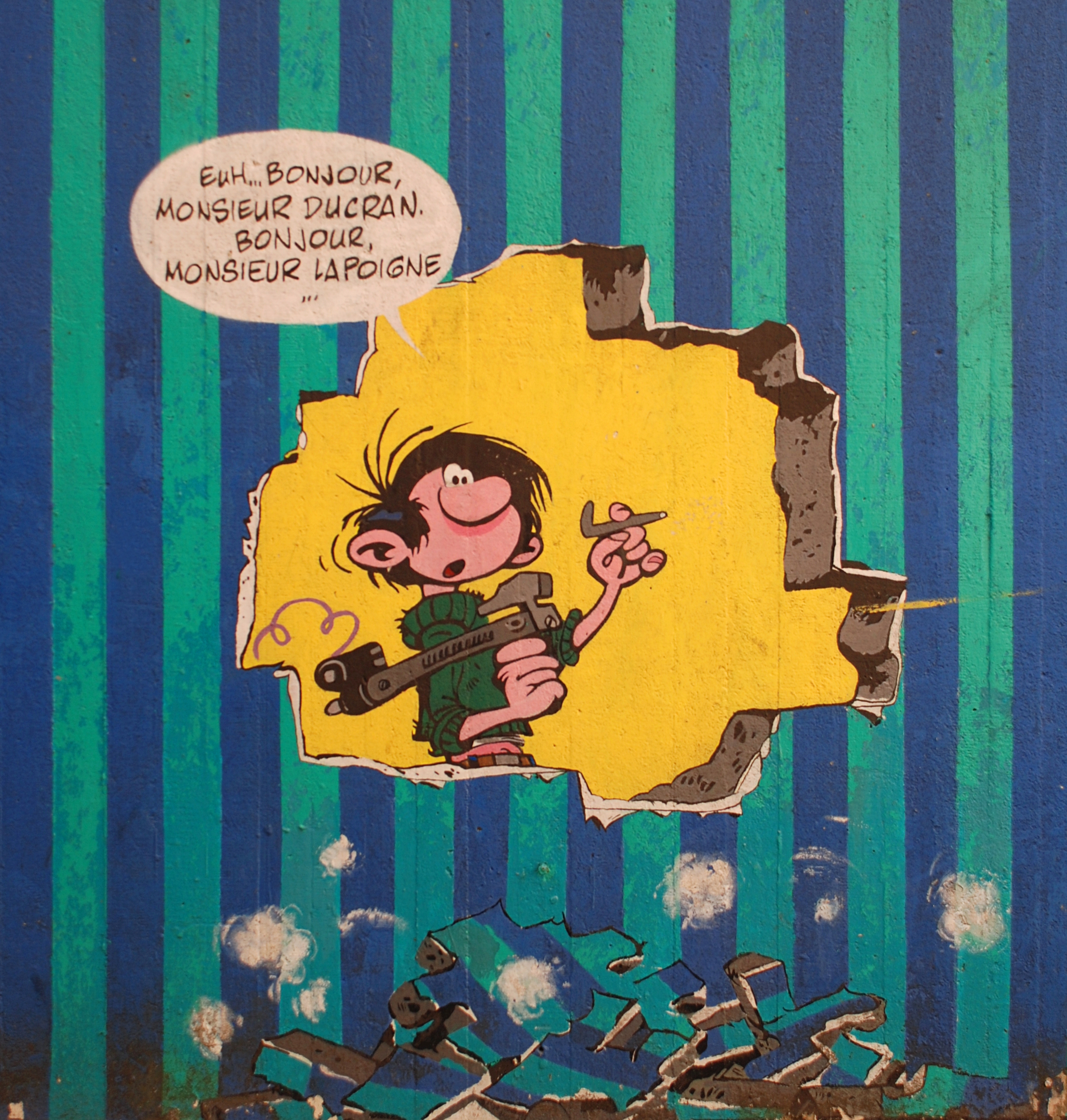
Mural painting representing Gaston in the rue des Wallons in Louvain-la-Neuve (Belgium)

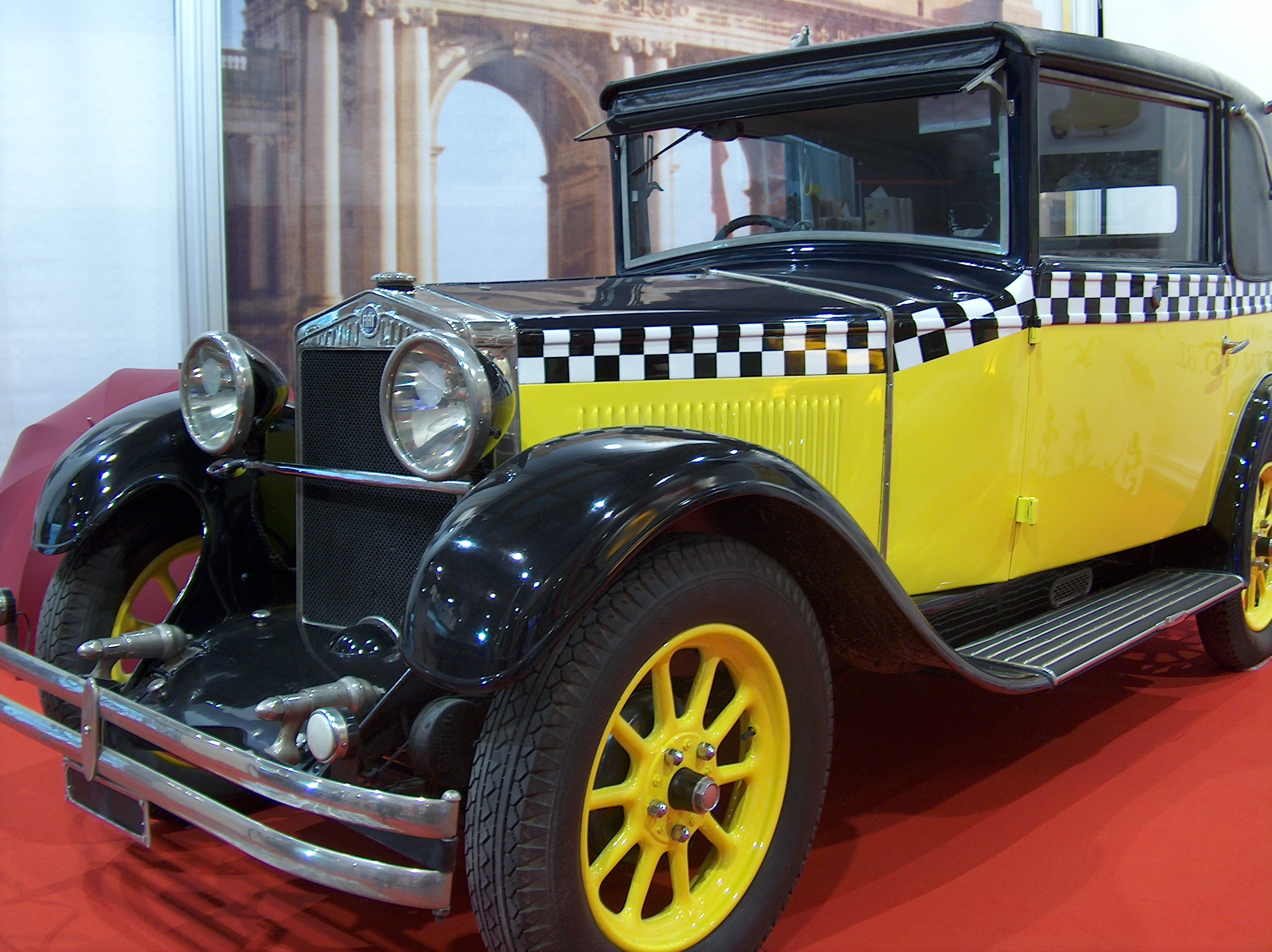
Replica of Gaston's car

In 1957, Spirou chief editor Yvan Delporte gave Franquin the idea for a new figure, Gaston Lagaffe (from the French la gaffe, meaning "the blunder"). Initially, a joke designed to fill up blank space in the magazine, the weekly strip, detailing the mishaps and madcap ideas and inventions of a terminally idle office boy working at the Spirou offices, took off and became one of Franquin's best-known creations.

However, Franquin soon suffered a period of depression, which forced him to stop drawing Spirou for a time. This happened between 1961 and 1963, in the middle of QRN sur Bretzelburg. During this time, he continued to draw Gaston despite his ill health, most likely because of the lighter nature of the series. (In one story, Bravo Les Brothers, Gaston's antics drive his boss Fantasio to yet another nervous breakdown. In desperation he takes some anti-depressants which "Franquin left behind".)

In 1967, Franquin passed Spirou et Fantasio on to a younger artist, Jean-Claude Fournier, and began to work full-time on his own creations.

Gaston gradually evolved from pure slapstick humor to feature themes important to Franquin, such as pacifism and environmentalism. Franquin also used its characters in paid ad strips he drew and worked with the strip on and off until his death.

=== Franquin's later period ===
The 1960s saw a clear evolution in Franquin's style, which grew more loose and intricate. This graphical evolution would continue throughout the next decade. Soon, Franquin was considered an undisputed master of the art form, on par with the likes of Hergé and his influence can be seen in the work of nearly every cartoonist hired by Spirou up until the end of the 1990s. Early comic fanzines from around 1970 featured Franquin's Monsters, individual drawings of imaginary beasts highlighting his graphical craftmanship.

Franquin in 1982

The last, and most radical, shift in Franquin's production happened in 1977, when he went through another nervous breakdown and began his Idées Noires strip (lit. "Dark Thoughts"), first for the Spirou supplement, Le Trombone Illustré (with other cartoonists like René Follet) and later for Fluide Glacial. With Idées Noires, Franquin showed the darker, pessimistic side of his nature. In one strip, a pair of flies are seen wandering through a strange landscape, discussing the mistakes of their predecessors. In the final panel, we see the landscape is a city made from human skulls, and one fly responds: "Don't be too hard on them, they did leave us such splendid cities". Drawn entirely in black and white, Idées Noires is much more adult-oriented than Franquin's other works, focusing on themes such as death, war, pollution, and capital punishment with a devastatingly sarcastic sense of humour. Franquin also shows clear opposition against game hunting, the death penalty, nuclear power and nuclear war.

From 1978 to 1986, he was part of the team that developed the concept of Isabelle, the adventures of a little girl in a world of witches and monsters. The character was named after Franquin's daughter.

Proof of his popular and critical appeal, Franquin was awarded the very first Grand Prix de la ville d'Angoulême in 1974. Many books by Franquin have been published, many of which are considered classics of the genre. They have been translated into many languages. Several books have been written about Franquin, such as Numa Sadoul's Et Franquin créa la gaffe, an exhaustive interview with the artist covering his entire career.

Franquin died in 1997 in Saint-Laurent-du-Var at the age of 73 from a heart attack. He was previously married to Liliane Servais. In 2004 took place the first major museum retrospective of his work, an exhibit called "Le monde de Franquin", in Paris' Cité des Sciences et de l'Industrie. This exhibition was continued in 2006 in the city where he was born, Brussels, the latter was fully bilingual (French/Dutch). In 2005, a Walloon survey elected him as the "18th greatest Belgian ever".

== Influence ==
Franquin's style rests in opposite corners of the aesthetic spectrum from Hergé: If the pictures of Tintin's creator were characterized by the use of ligne claire, flat colors, and certain statics, Franquin's graphic approach progressively evolved towards a multi-color aesthetics, chiaroscuro and a vigorous sense of movement. Hergé expressed on several occasions his admiration for Franquin's work: "Compared to him, I’m but a poor draftsman".

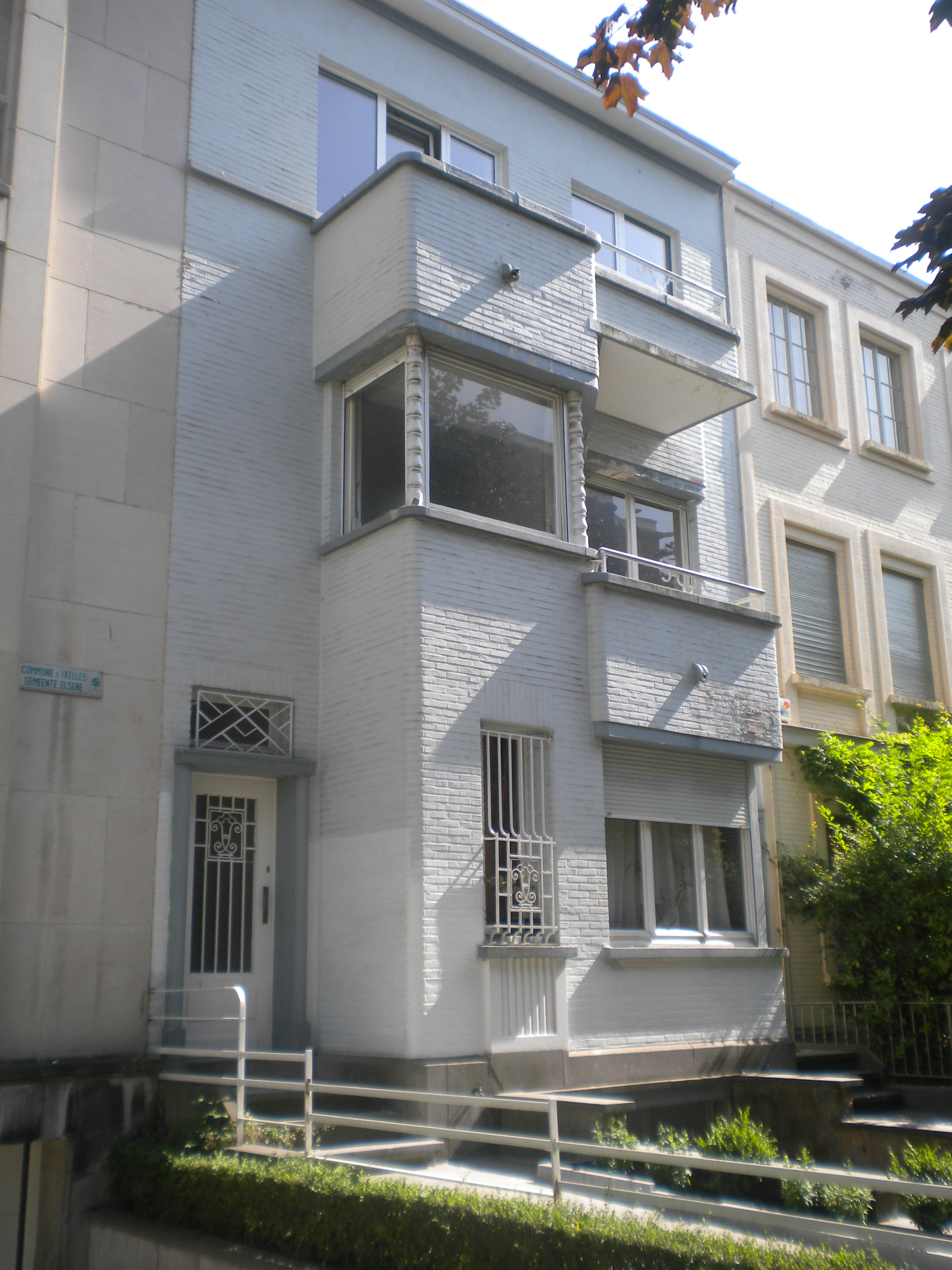
Franquin's studio in avenue du Brésil at Ixelles

Franquin was a prominent member of the first generation of the “Marcinelle School” (École de Marcinelle), also formed by Morris and Will, who would be joined during the 50s by the second generation including, among others, Peyo, Tillieux, and two subsequent generations joining during the 60s and 70-80s. Within this group, Franquin's influence was uncontested, especially among the authors that continued the series Spirou et Fantasio after he left. Jean-Claude Fournier, Nic Broca, and especially Janry (Jean-Richard Geurts) showed in this series graphic styles that tried to mimic with varying degrees of success the features of Franquin's style.

Other Franco-Belgian authors that show Franquin's influence were Dino Attanasio and Mittéï (Jean Mariette), both responsible for the series Modeste et Pompon after he left, Jidéhem (Jean De Mesmaeker), a usual collaborator of Franquin for Spirou et Fantasio and Gaston Lagaffe, Batem (Luc Collin), artist of the Marsupilami series, or Pierre Seron, who cloned Franquin's style in his series Les Petits Hommes.

A most remarkable case is Franquin's influence on Francisco Ibáñez, possibly the most widely published Spanish author since the 1950s. Starting in the 1970s, Ibáñez made extensive use of ideas and designs from Franquin's works, adapting them to his own universe, but also importing many graphic and narrative solutions. Even one of his characters, "El Botones Sacarino", can be easily identified as a hybrid of Spirou (he is a bellboy) and Gaston Lagaffe (he works in a publishing company and is the source of never-ending disasters), whom he resembles physically. Franquin's shadow is even more obvious in the work of Ramón María Casanyes, a disciple and ghost collaborator of Ibáñez, especially in some of his solo works such as the short-lived "Tito, Homo Sapiens 2000", where the Franco-Belgian descent is unquestionable.

== Awards and honors ==
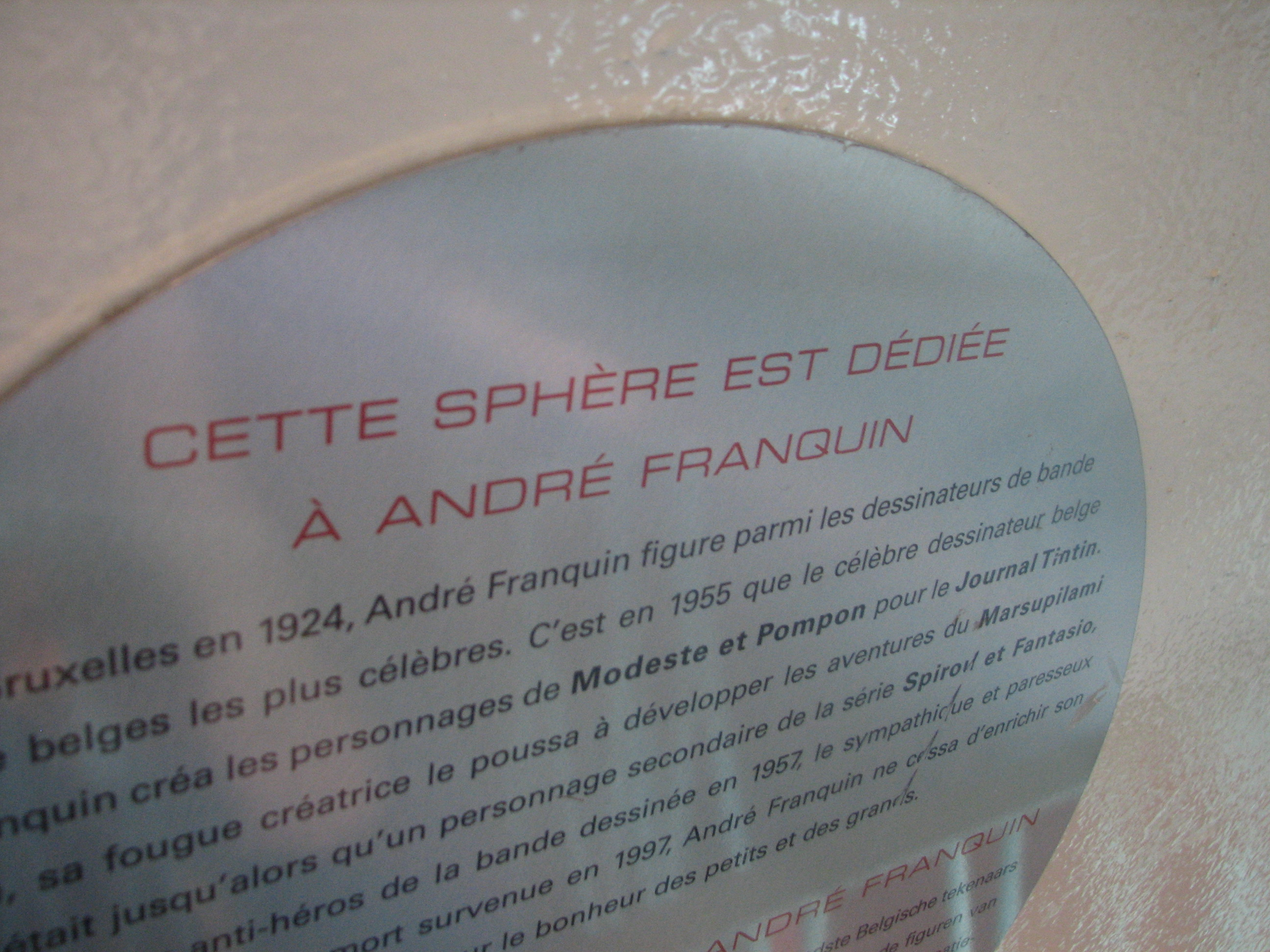
Sign in Brussels, tribute to André Franquin

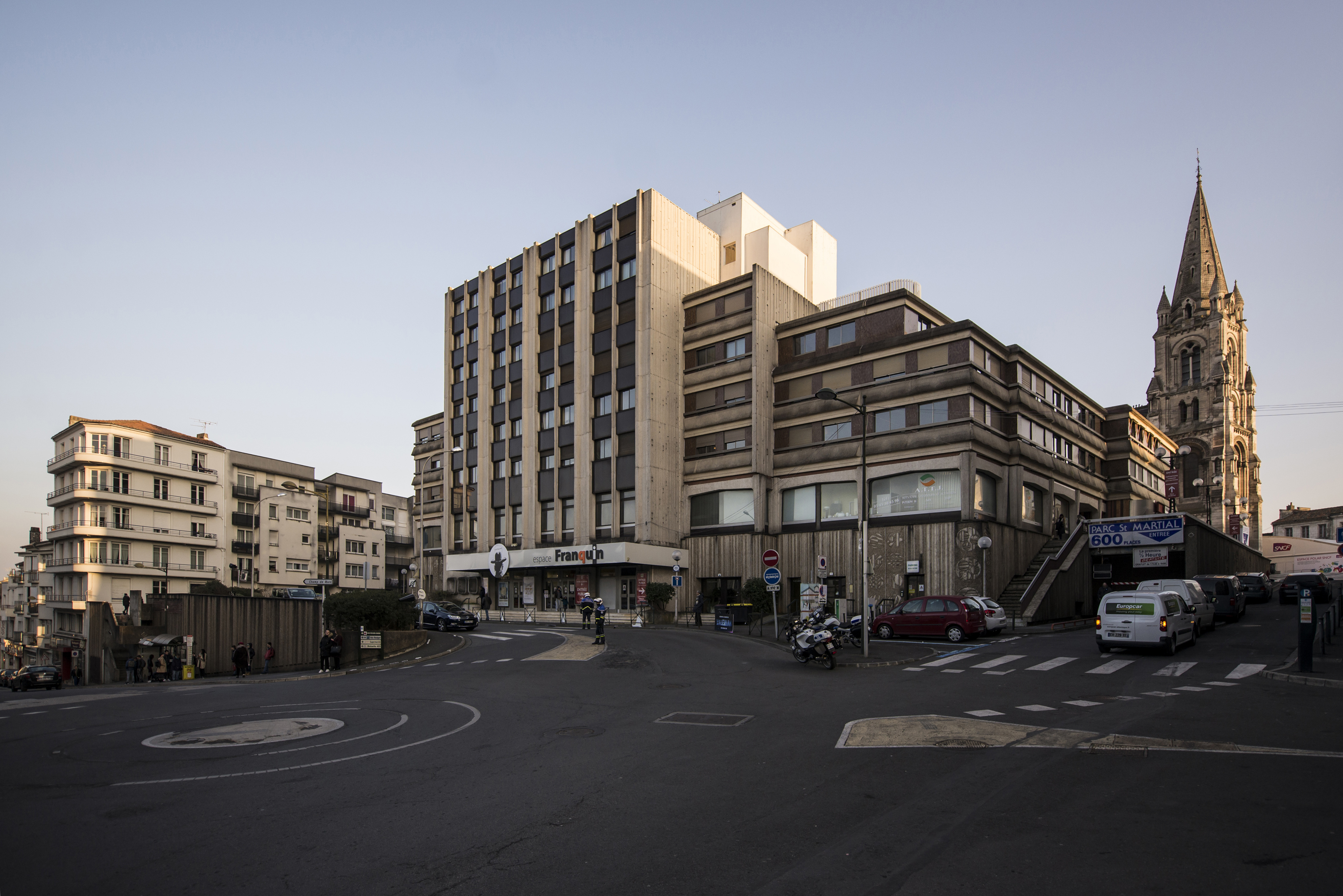
Espace Franquin at Angoulême
- 1972: Prix Saint-Michel, Belgium, for Gaston Lagaffe
- 1974: First Grand Prix de la ville d'Angoulême, France
- 1980: Adamson Award, Sweden
- 1981: Prix Saint-Michel, Belgium, for Idées noires
- 1987: Grand Prix for the Graphic Arts at the Angoulême International Comics Festival
- 1991: Knight of the Order of Leopold, Belgium, for most than twenty years of career
- 1996: Special Prize for outstanding life's work at the Max & Moritz Prizes in Erlangen, Germany
- 2017: Asteroid 293985 Franquin, discovered by French amateur astronomer Bernard Christophe in 2007, was named in his memory. The official naming citation was published by the Minor Planet Center on 12 March 2017 (M.P.C. 103971).

== Bibliography ==
=== Series ===
Series	Years	Albums	Editor	Remarks
Spirou et Fantasio	1946–1968	20	Dupuis	with Jijé, Henri Gillain, Maurice Rosy, Will, Greg, Jidéhem, Jean Roba
Modeste et Pompon	1955–1959	3^{[a]}	Lombard	with René Goscinny and Greg
Gaston Lagaffe	1957–1996	19^{[b]}	Dupuis and Marsu Productions	with Yvan Delporte and Jidéhem
Le Petit Noël	1957–1959	1	Dupuis	4 volumes half-format editions
Idées noires	1977–1983	2	Fluide Glacial	with Yvan Delporte and Jean Roba
Isabelle	1978–1986	5	Dupuis	scenarios with Delporte and Macherot, art by Will
Marsupilami	1987–1989	3^{[c]}	Marsu Productions	with Batem, Greg and Yann

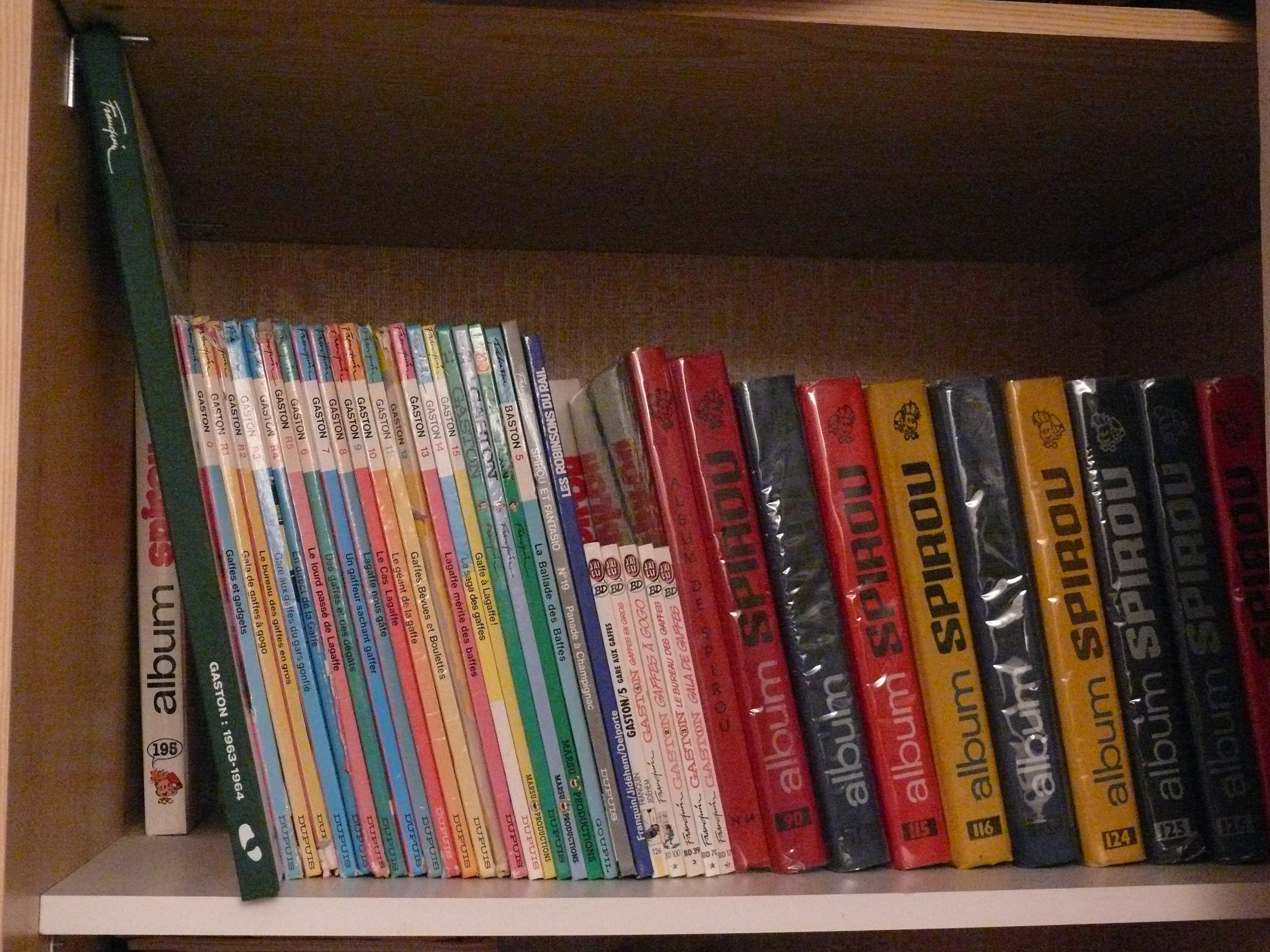
Library including collections of Spirou's journal and Gaston's albums

- a. The original collection. Some collections consist of four albums. The content is largely the same, however, where the gags have been spread out on thinner albums.
- b. The Special Edition series, published in chronological order by Dupuis and Marsu Productions in connection with the series' 40-year anniversary.
- c. Except for the first three main albums in the series, Franquin was also the creator of No. 0 Capturez un Marsupilami, a collection of earlier short stories with the character.
- For Spirou et Fantasio, Modeste et Pompon, Isabelle and Marsupilami, several new albums were published by other artists after Franquin left the series.

=== One-shots ===
- Cauchemarrant (1979, published by Bédérama)
- Les robinsons du rail (1981, art by Franquin, text by Yvan Delporte; published by L'Atelier)
- Les démêlés d'Arnest Ringard et d'Augraphie (1981, art by Frédéric Jannin, text by Franquin and Yvan Delporte)
- L'Encyclopédie du Marsupilami (1991, illustrated faux encyclopedia about Marsupilami)
- Arnest Ringard et Augraphie (2006, art by Frédéric Jannin, text by Franquin and Yvan Delporte; redrawn and extended version of the above)
- Slowburn (1982, art by Franquin, text by Gotlib; published by Collectoropolis)
- Les Tifous (1990, published by Dessis)
- Le trombone illustré (2005, published by Marsu Productions)
- Un monstre par semaine (2005, published by Marsu Productions)
- Les noëls de Franquin (2006, art by Franquin, text by Yvan Delporte; published by Marsu Productions)

=== Sketchbooks ===
(published by Marsu Productions)

- Les doodles de Franquin
- Le bestiaire de Franquin
- Le bestiaire de Franquin tome 2
- Les monstres de Franquin
- Les monstres de Franquin tome 2
- Tronches à gogo
- Les signatures de Franquin
