= Blueberry (comics) =

French-Belgian comic series

- Blueberry as drawn by Jean Giraud.

Publication information
- Publisher: Dargaud, Le Lombard, Fleurus, Hachette, Novedi, Alpen Publishers, Dupuis
- Format: Graphic novel
- Genre: Western
- Publication date: 1963–2007
- Main character: Mike S. Blueberry (born as Michael Steven Donovan)

Creative team
- Created by: Jean-Michel Charlier; Jean Giraud
- Written by: Jean-Michel Charlier (1963–1989†), Jean Giraud (1990–2012†)
- Artist(s): Jean Giraud (1963–2012); Jijé (1964, 1965); Michel Rouge (1980); Colin Wilson (1986)
- Colorist(s): Claude Poppé (1963–1965); Jean Giraud (1966–2012); Évelyne Tranlé (1970, 1972, 1979–1981); Fraisic Marot (1983); Janet Gale (1986); Florence Breton (1990–1999); Claudine Blanc-Dumont (1993); Claire Champeval (2003); Scarlett (2005)

Blueberry is a Western comic series created in the Franco-Belgian bandes dessinées (BD) tradition by the Belgian scriptwriter Jean-Michel Charlier and French comics artist Jean "Mœbius" Giraud. It chronicles the adventures of Mike Steve Donovan alias Blueberry on his travels through the American Old West. Blueberry is an atypical western hero; he is not a wandering lawman who brings evil-doers to justice, nor a handsome cowboy, who "rides into town, saves the ranch, becomes the new sheriff and marries the schoolmarm". In any situation, he sees what he thinks needs doing, and he does it.

The series spawned out of the 1963 Fort Navajo comics series, originally intended as an ensemble narrative, but which quickly gravitated around the breakout character "Blueberry" as the main and central character after the first two stories, causing the series to continue under his name later on. The older stories, released under the Fort Navajo moniker, were ultimately reissued under the name Blueberry as well in later reprint runs. Two spin-off, or rather, sub-series, La Jeunesse de Blueberry (Young Blueberry) and Marshal Blueberry, were created pursuant the main series reaching its peak in popularity in the early 1980s.

It has been remarked that during the 1960s, Blueberry "was as much a staple in French comics as, say, The Avengers or The Flash here [in the USA]".

== Synopsis ==
Born on 30 October 1843 on Redwood Plantation near Augusta, Georgia, Michael Steven Donovan is the son of a rich Southern planter and starts out life as a decided racist. On the brink of the American Civil War, Donovan is forced to flee north after being framed for the murder of his fiancée Harriet Tucker's father, a plantation owner. On his flight toward the Kentucky border, he is saved by Long Sam, a fugitive African-American slave from his father's estate, who paid with his life for his act of altruism. Inspired when he sees a blueberry bush, Donovan chooses the surname "Blueberry" as an alias when rescued from his Southern pursuers by a Union cavalry patrol (during his flight war had broken out between the States). After enlisting in the Union Army, he becomes an enemy of discrimination of all kinds, fighting against the Confederates (although being a Southerner himself, first enlisting as a bugler in order to avoid having to fire upon his former countrymen), later trying to protect the rights of Native Americans. He starts his adventures in the Far West as a lieutenant in the United States Cavalry shortly after the war. On his many travels in the West, Blueberry is frequently accompanied by his trusted companions, the hard-drinking deputy Jimmy McClure, and later also by "Red Neck" Wooley, a rugged pioneer and army scout.

== Publication history ==
In his youth, Giraud had been a passionate fan of American Westerns and Blueberry has its roots in his earlier Western-themed works such as the Frank et Jeremie shorts, which were drawn for Far West magazine when he was only 18 – also having been his first sales as free-lancer – and the by Joseph "Jijé" Gillain heavily inspired Western short stories he created for the magazines from French publisher Fleurus (his first professional tenured employment as comic artist in the period 1956–1958), in particular the series of short Western comics featuring the same protagonist Art Howell which can be considered as Giraud's de facto first realistic Western series (and thus a precursor to Blueberry), as he himself did in effect, since he, save the first one, endowed these stories with the subtitle "Un aventure d'Art Howell". This was followed by his collaboration with Jijé himself on an episode of the latter's Jerry Spring series in 1960, which appeared in the Belgian comics magazine Spirou ("La Route de Coronado", issues 1192 – 1213, 1961), aside from his subsequent Western contributions to Benoit Gillian's (son of Jijé) short-lived comic magazine Bonux-Boy (1960/61). Directly before he started his apprenticeship at Jijé, Jean Giraud had already approached Jean-Michel Charlier on his own accord, asking him if he was interested in writing scripts for a new western series for publication in Pilote, the just by Charlier co-launched legendary French comic magazine. Charlier refused on that occasion, claiming he never felt much empathy for the genre. Biographer Gilles Ratier though, has noted that Charlier, when he felt he was preaching to the choir, had the tendency to "take liberties" with actual events for dramatic effect. Charlier had in effect already written several Westerns, both comics and illustrated short prose stories, in the period 1949-1959 for various previous magazines. One such short entailed the text comic "Cochise" in Jeannot magazine, July 1957, dealing with the historical "Bascom Affair", which six years later would become the apotheosis of the first Blueberry story, "Fort Navajo". Furthermore, Charlier had already visited the South-West of the United States in 1960, resulting in several Native-American themed educational Pilote editorials.

In 1962, the magazine sent Charlier on a reporting assignment around the world for its editorials, and one of his last 1963 ports of call was Edwards Airforce Base in the Mojave Desert, California. He took the opportunity to (re-)discover the American West, returning to France with a strong urge to write a western. First he asked Jijé to draw the series, but Jijé, a lifelong friend and collaborator of Charlier, thought there would be a conflict of interest, since he was then a tenured artist at Spirou, a competing comic magazine, which published his own Western comic Jerry Spring, and in which he was very much invested. In his stead, Jijé proposed his protégé Giraud as the artist. A happy coincidence was that Giraud was also intimately familiar with the landscapes that had inspired Charlier, as he already had been on an extended stay of nine months in Mexico in 1956, where the endless blue skies and unending flat plains of Mexico's northern deserts had "cracked open his mind".

=== Original publications in French ===
"Charlier, together with Goscinny the editors-in-chief, wanted a western. He already had outlines in mind, but asked me to come up with a name. He suggested a couple of names, which sounded not bad, but I wanted something softer for this rough and basic character. It was then that I saw that somebody had signed with the name "Blueberry" in Geographic Magazine, which was lying opened in front of me, purely by coincident. That was the right choice, and Charlier liked the name as well. For the hero's facial traits, I chose Belmondo, as he was at the time something of an art symbol for guys my age".

— Giraud, 1975, on his claim of inventing the name Blueberry.

"From the very beginning, I did not want the classic type of fearless lawman like Red Ryder, The Lone Ranger or Jerry Spring as a hero. That kind of character had, in my opinion, already been done to death. That is why I made Blueberry the very opposite of these classic heroic archetypes. He is dirty, ugly, and bad-tempered. He drinks, smokes, gambles and swears. And also, to make him even more different from the other characters, who are more the wandering kind, I decided to make him a soldier. But again, I did not want him to be a good little soldier who follows orders and does what he is instructed to do. Blueberry is the exact opposite of that; he is undisciplined, cynical and hates authority."

— Charlier, 1989, on making Blueberry intentionally the opposite of the comic heroes he had hitherto created.

"[The idea of giving Blueberry Belmondo's face] originated from the both of us. That came about this way: To have Blueberry come across as a non-conformist, I described him right from the start as uncombed, disheveled, unshaven, broken nosed, etc. After he had read that, Jean exclaimed to me, "That's Belmondo!""

— Charlier, 1978, on conceiving the initial countenance of Blueberry.

note: English titles in parentheses where they exist and when first mentioned, original titles only where none are available

Blueberry was first published in the October 31, 1963 issue of Pilote magazine – hence Charlier's corresponding October 30 birth-date for his fictional character, when the magazine was printed and ready for dissemination. Initially titled "Fort Navajo", the story grew into 46 pages over the following issues. In this series Blueberry – whose physical appearance was inspired by French actor Jean-Paul Belmondo – was only one of many protagonists; the series was originally intended to be an assemble narrative, but quickly gravitated towards Blueberry as the central and primary character, even though the series' (sub-)title Fort Navajo, une Aventure du Lieutenant Blueberry was maintained for a decade by original publisher Dargaud for the numerous reprint, and international, runs, before the "Fort Navajo" (sub-)moniker was finally dropped in 1973 with the book publication of "L'homme qui valait 500 000 $" ("The Half-a-Million Dollar Man"). Charlier came up with the name during his American trip: "When I was traveling throughout the West, I was accompanied by a fellow journalist who was just in love with blueberry jam, so much in love, in fact, that I had nicknamed him 'Blueberry'. When I began to create the new series, and everything started to fall into place, I decided to reuse my friend's nickname, because I liked it and thought it was funny. [...] I had no idea that he would prove so popular that he would eventually take over the entire series, and later we would be stuck with that silly name!" In an anecdote, Charlier related how caught off guard he had been: "My memory is a somewhat like a sieve. In the first album, Blueberry was called Steve. I forgot that first name and then I named him Mike. So, in order to get things straight, I coined him Mike Steve Blueberry eventually; this kind of forgetfulness happens to me often".

Part of the Blueberry's breakout popularity had been his rebellious, anti-establishment character traits he had been intentionally and uncharacteristically endowed with by co-creator Charlier, making him very much the opposite of the other law abiding, squeaky clean comic heroes Charlier had usually created up until then. This was however, in line with the prevailing mood of the counterculture of the 1960s, influences from which even the right-wing conservative Charlier could not escape entirely. It has enticed him to indulge in a little creative experimentation with the Blueberry character, having become somewhat bored and fed up with his usual heroes, particularly the military ones like Buck Danny – Charlier usually reserved foibles for his secondary main characters to provide his creations with some levity and humanity, such as Blueberry's flawed friend Jimmy McClure. In stark contrast, one of the other intended major characters of the Fort Navajo series had been Blueberry's friend and colleague lieutenant Graig, who was very much a classic Charlier comics hero, law abiding, a stickler for rules and regulations, unquestioning in his blind obedience to, and acceptance of, authority, and so on. Charlier had apparently expected the presence of the Blueberry character in his creation to be of a transient nature, as he represented everything that Charlier was personally opposed to in private life, quite strongly so according to biographer Ratier.

Due to the fact that Blueberry became the most popular character so early on in the Fort Navajo story-arc, Charlier was forced to do an about-face and started to write out the other main characters, including lieutenant Graig, he had in place in order to make room for Blueberry. However, in one instance that had an unexpected side effect; when Charlier killed off the Native-American lieutenant Crowe in the fifth and last installment of the story-arc, "La piste des Navajos" ("Trail of the Navajo"), the editorial offices of Pilote received many angry letters from readers accusing Charlier of murdering a sympathetic protagonist. Taken aback, Charlier later stated: "It was too late to do anything about it, it was done. A strange experience, Giraud in particular took it very hard". Still, while all characters slated for prominence were written out, Blueberry excepted, one major, recurrent secondary character was written in over the course of the story arc in "Le cavalier perdu" ("Mission to Mexico"), Blueberry's friend and sidekick Jimmy McClure. Actually, and by his own admission, Charlier had originally written McClure as a temporary, minor background character, but Giraud was so taken with the character that he asked Charlier to expand his role in the series, and which stands out as the earliest known instance of Giraud exercising influence on the scripts of his senior colleague.

In post-war Europe, it has been tradition to release comics in "pre-publication" as serialized magazine episodes, before publication as a comic book, or rather comic album (in North-American understanding though, "graphic novel" is the more applicable terminology in this case, particularly where the physical properties of the book format are concerned, the distinction being otherwise a non-issue in native France), typically with a one to two year lag. In French, (Young) Blueberry has firstly seen serialized pre-publication in Pilote (issue 210, 31 October 1963 – issue 720, 23 August 1973) and Super Pocket Pilote (issue 1, 1 July 1969 – issue 9, 19 October 1970) from publisher Dargaud, the parent and main publisher of Blueberry, with Giraud frequently creating original Blueberry art for the magazine covers and illustrations for editorials, aside from creating on occasion summarizing, introduction plates, none of which reprinted in the original book editions. Nonetheless, much of this material did find its way in later reprint variations, particularly in the editorials of the 2012-2019 main series anthology, or omnibus, collection – invariably called "integral(e)s" in the respective languages of mainland Europe – of parent publisher Dargaud, and in those of their licensees such as Egmont for their earlier German/Danish/Norwegian 2006-2017 all-series integral edition collection

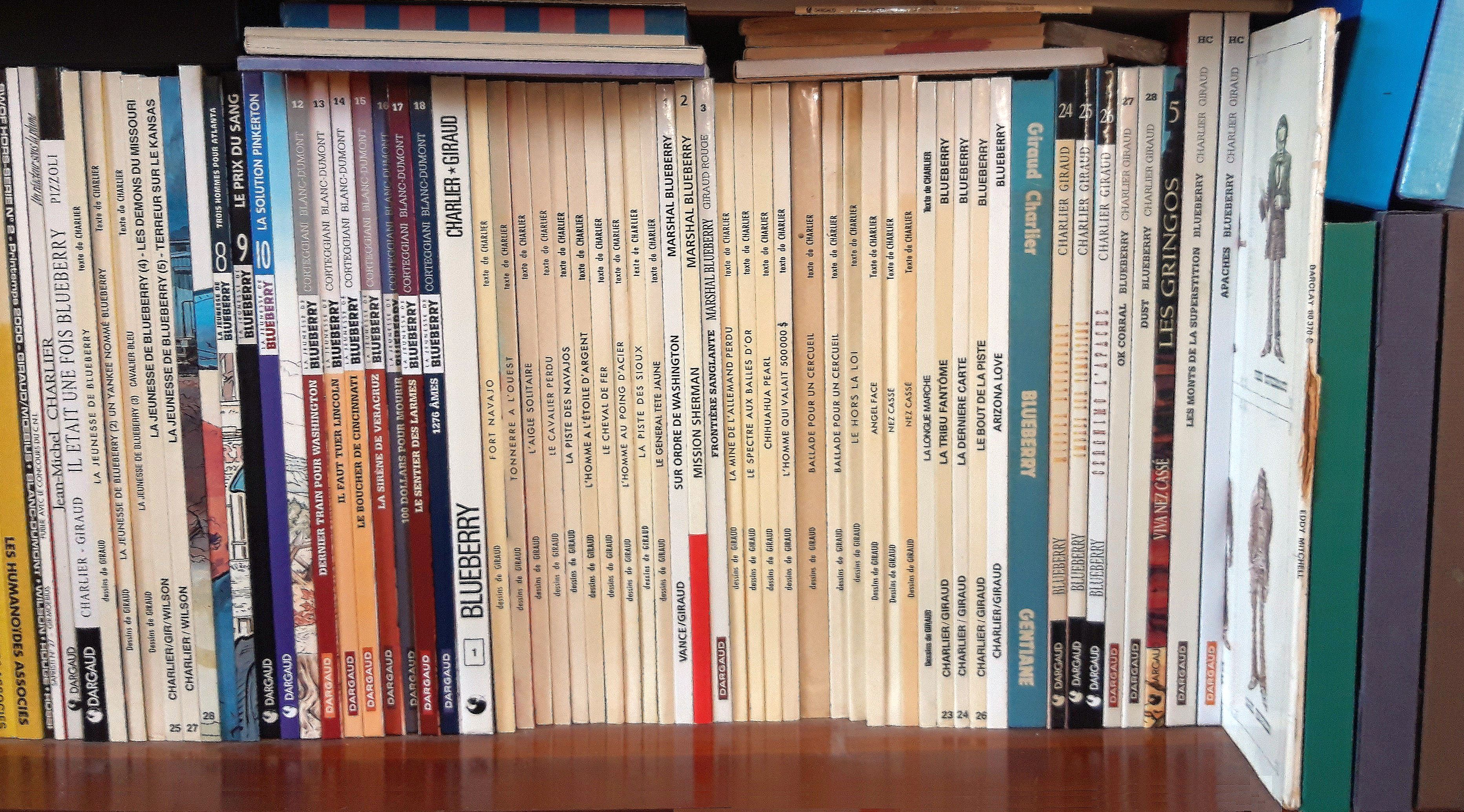
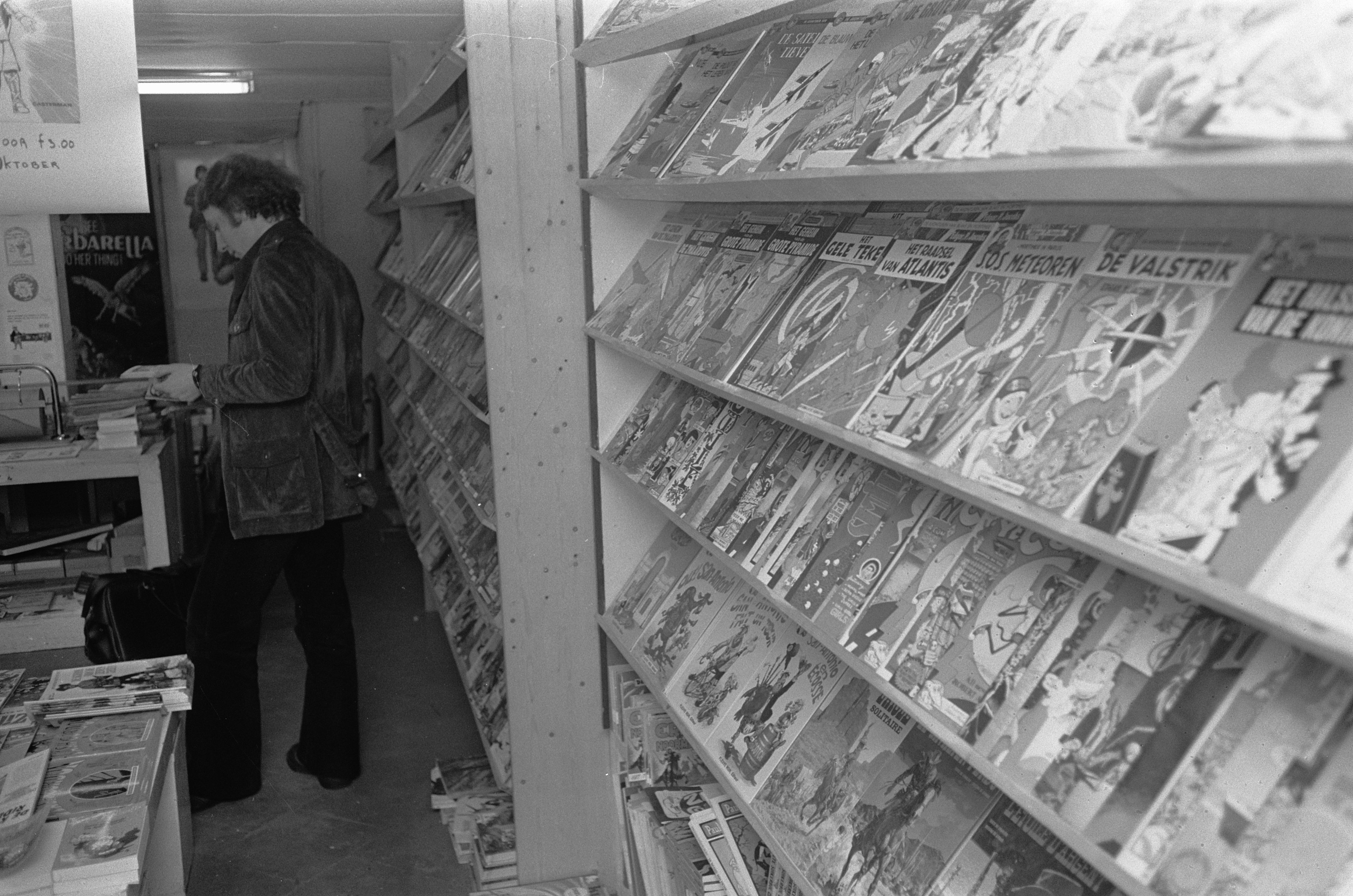
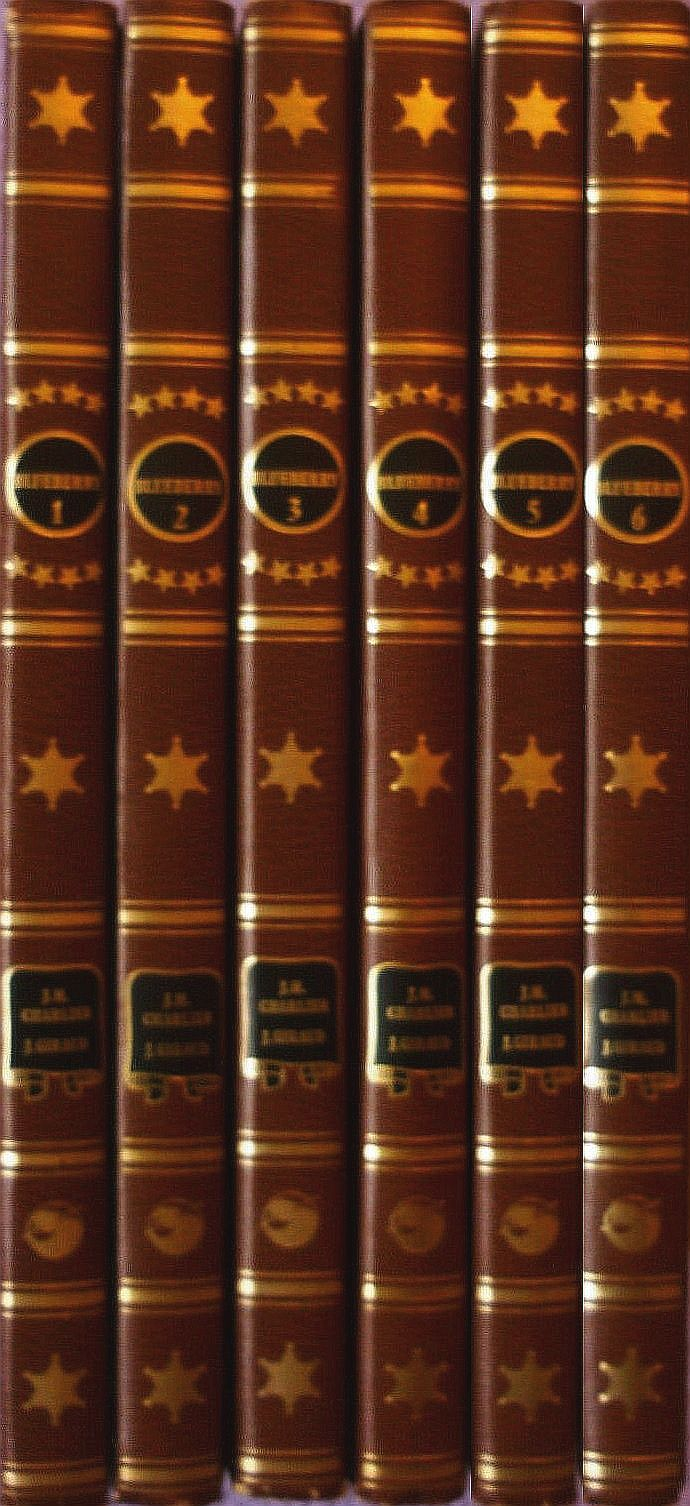
Bookshelf with French-language Blueberry hardcover comic albums (l), some of them as 1973 imports on display at the Dutch comic book store Lambiek in the lower right corner (c), very shortly before the first Dutch-language (softcover) translations were released by Le Lombard (Flanders)/Helmond (Dutch publisher) later that year, and the spines of the six Blueberry volumes in the 1984 deluxe Rombaldi intégrale collection (r).

The first (French) Blueberry comic album, "Fort Navajo", was released in September 1965 and originally appeared as the 17th (and last) volume of the La Collection Pilote series. Actually, this collection had been an initiative of Charlier himself in his function as publishing co-editor, and the 17 titles in the collection were in effect Dargaud's first comic album releases, and an influential release at that. In order to give these releases a more "mature" image, the books were from the start executed as hard cover editions. Favorably received and though not being the first, the hard cover format became the norm in France definitively, where henceforth all comic albums were executed in the format – becoming indeed generally accepted as a mature part of French culture eventually – whereas the vast majority of the other European countries continued to employ the soft cover format for decades to come, somewhat reflecting the status comic books held in their respective societies at the time. These included for the time being French-Belgium as well, Charlier's native country, where the exact same collection was concurrently licensed to, and released by Le Lombard, albeit as soft cover only. Charlier's initiative was not entirely devoid of a healthy dose of self-interest, as over half the releases in the collection, were, aside from Blueberry, titles from other comic series he had co-created. After "Fort Navajo", the collection was suspended and each comic hero hitherto featured therein, spun off in book series of their own, including Blueberry or rather Fort Navajo, une Aventure du Lieutenant Blueberry as it was then still coined.

After Dargaud had lost publishing rights for over a decade for new Blueberry titles to firstly German publisher Koralle-Verlag and subsequently to Belgian publisher Novedi, as a result from a conflict with the creators over Blueberry royalties, the series has seen, predominantly one-time only, French pre-publication in such comic magazines as Métal Hurlant, L'Écho des savanes and Super As. Other European countries followed the same template with local magazines. However, the format, for decades a staple in Europe and shaping entire generations of comic readers, went out of vogue in the late 1980s/early 1990s and the vast majority of European comic magazines have since then become defunct by the mid-1990s, including those from Belgium, the country were the phenomenon was born in the late 1930s. Ironically, while "Le bout de la piste" ("The End of the Trail") and "Arizona Love" became main series titles to see serialized pre-publication elsewhere, neither were serialized as such in France itself, where "La tribu fantôme" ("The Ghost Tribe") had previously become the last Blueberry title pre-published as such in L'Écho des savanes. Henceforth, new Blueberry titles were until 1997 directly released in album format, starting with the 1990 La Jeunesse de Blueberry (Young Blueberry) title, "Le raid infernal". Any subsequent French magazine, or newspaper serialized publication occurred after the initial book release while Blueberry was housed at Novedi and its successor, Swiss publisher Alpen Publishers, and which had actually already included "Angel Face" in Nouveau Tintin, and "La dernière carte" ("The Last Card") in Spirou previously, both having been serialized after their respective book releases.

After Charlier had died on 10 July 1989, Giraud, aside from completing "Arizona Love" on his own, wrote and drew five albums, from "Mister Blueberry" to "Dust" (constituting the OK Corral story arc), until his own death in 2012. Additionally, Giraud also scripted the intermezzo series Marshal Blueberry (1991-2000), but had no creative input for the La Jeunesse de Blueberry prequel series, after the first three, original volumes.

By the time Giraud embarked on the OK Corral cycle, publishing rights had returned to Dargaud, and that publisher decided to revitalize the magazine serialized pre-publication format as part of their marketing effort on behalf of Blueberry's return (see below), albeit with a twist; As Dargaud no longer had a comic magazine of their own (Pilote had become defunct in 1989), it was decided to farm out pre-publication to parties who showed the most interest, resulting in that Blueberry titles in that cycle became serialized in different publications, not all necessarily comic-related by origin. The summer of 1997 saw the serialization of "Ombres sur Tombstone" in the French daily newspaper Le Monde, followed by the pre-publication of "Géronimo l'Apache" in the monthly BoDoï comic magazine, directly before the album release in October 1999 as part of Dargaud's substantial marketing campaign for the album. The next title, "OK Corral", was published in a similar manner in the summer of 2003 in the "L'ExpressMag" appendix of the non-comic weekly news magazine L'Express.

The mere fact that serious newspapers and magazines were by then vying for the opportunity to run Blueberry in their publications first (aside from the above-mentioned publications, the newspaper France-Soir had already run the first two outings of the revitalized La Jeunesse de Blueberry series in 1985 and 1987 – see below), was testament to the status Blueberry and its creator(s) had by then attained in Francophone Europe.

==== Royalties conflict (1974–1979) ====
"That was a coincidence all right. It coincided with the break between Jean-Michel and Dargaud, where questionable issues in regard to authors' rights were in play".

— Giraud, 1988, when asked if the format change of Pilote from a weekly to monthly magazine had anything to do with the creators leaving.

With the growing popularity of Blueberry came the increasing disenchantment over financial remunerations of the series. Already in 1974, Charlier made his displeasure known in this regard, when he had "Angel Face" pre-published in Nouveau Tintin of industry competitor Le Lombard, the first time a Blueberry adventure was not serialized in Pilote – nor would it ever be again in hindsight. The magazine was forced to drop the announcement page it had prepared for the story. Unfazed, Dargaud founder and owner Georges Dargaud, unwilling to give in, countered by having the book released before Nouveau Tintin had even had the chance to run the story. Then Giraud left on his own accord. While Charlier had no influence on this whatsoever, it did serve a purpose as far as he was concerned. Giraud had left Blueberry on a cliff-hanger with "Angel Face", resulting in an insatiable demand for more, putting the pressure on Dargaud. Whenever Georges Dargaud asked Charlier for a next Blueberry adventure, repeatedly, Charlier was now able to respond that he was "devoid of inspiration".

As a matter of fact, Giraud was dying to leave Pilote and Blueberry, partly because he was tired of the stifling publication pressure he was under in order to produce the series, partly because of the royalties conflict, but mostly because he wanted to further explore and develop his artistic "Mœbius" alter ego. For Giraud the conflict was actually a godsend: "At that moment Charlier and I also had a financial conflict with Dargaud which came at the exact right time, because it provided me with an alibi [to leave]". The latter reason for him to leave, took on an urgency after Alejandro Jodorowsky, impressed by his Blueberry art, had already invited Giraud to work as concept designer and storyboard artist on his Dune movie project earlier that year, constituting the first Jodorowsky/Mœbius collaboration. Very eager to work on this project as Jodorowsky requested his presence, Giraud greatly accelerated his work on "Angel Face", then underway, breaking his "absolute record speed-drawing", as he had coined it, and sheared off weeks from its originally intended completion date. Giraud in overdrive was so fast that he even overtook Charlier's script pages (Charlier habitually fed his artists piecemeal with script pages, usually a couple at the time), forcing him to write ten pages of the story on his own, as Charlier was at that time on documentary assignment in the United States for French television. Upon his return, Charlier took one look at the pages completed in his absence, and continued where Giraud had left off without further much ado. Charlier himself had actually already left Dargaud in 1972, because he additionally felt ill at ease with the editorial modernization of Pilote, which resulted from the 1968 revolt at the editorial offices staged by key artists, chief among them Giraud (see also: "Giraud on his part in the uprising at Pilote"). Though Charlier continued to provide his younger colleague with scripts (but not his other artists), he started working as documentary maker for French television. It was while he was working on two documentaries on the Mexican Revolution that he gained inspiration for his below-mentioned Les Gringos Western comic series, which started its run in 1979 at Koralle.

It was the first time that Giraud wrote for Blueberry by himself, and was, considering Charlier's easy acceptance of Giraud's writing, also testament to the close, and trusting working relationship both men had cultivated by that time. Incidentally, Giraud intimated that the deteriorating circumstances at Pilote had already left its mark on him before he left: "The story was started in 1972/73 but remained shelved until 1975 [sic.]. Yet, I think one can not discern its difficult birth; there are good scenes, pages I really poured heart and soul into. It is true that [the art for] "Le hors-la-loi" ("The Outlaw") had been quite weak, but "Angel Face" made up for it".

Five years later, Giraud was ready to return to Blueberry, at long last feeling the urge again to do so, but not into the employ of Pilote/Dargaud, as he had formally terminated his position in 1974 with no intention whatsoever to return, instead plying his Blueberry trade as a freelancer: "Publishers were waving with those fat checks, so we started again. But it is no longer the same. I won't be taken in by Blueberry anymore!", referring to the first half of the 1970s when he felt smothered by his co-creation. Yet, the whole business surrounding Blueberry residuals itself remained unresolved, and in order to drive home the point the pe-publication of the eagerly awaited "Nez Cassé" ("Broken Nose") story was farmed out to Métal Hurlant magazine (published by Les Humanoïdes Associés, co-founded by Giraud in 1974, and in the US released as Heavy Metal in the mid-1970s, though the story was not run in the American version), instead of Pilote. That Charlier was able to repeat this ploy after "Angel Face" stemmed from the proviso he had built in when he signed over the publication, and copyrights of his syndication agency EdiFrance/EdiPresse – co-established in 1955 with Victor Hubinon, Albert Uderzo, and René Goscinny for the express purpose to syndicate their own and other artist's comic creations – to Dargaud in 1960. On that occasion Charlier, owning a law degree, stipulated an exemption clause for magazine (pre-)publications of his own (co-)creations. Though never intended as such, the hitherto dormant exemption clause now served him well in his conflict with Dargaud, without having to fear for any legal ramifications on Dargaud's part. Yet, Georges Dargaud refused to take the bait and the creators subsequently put forward the Jim Cutlass western comic as a last ditch effort to spell out to Dargaud that the creators had other options. Dargaud still would not budge. It was then that it became clear to Charlier, that he was left with no other option than to leave, and this he did taking all his other co-creations with him, to wit Redbeard and Tanguy et Laverdure, which, while not as popular as Blueberry, were steady money making properties for Dargaud nonetheless.

==== Blueberry's publishing wanderings (1979–1990) ====
Though they were still contractually obligated to leave their most recent Blueberry title, "Nez Cassé", at Dargaud for book publication, Charlier and Giraud then threw in their lot with German publisher Koralle-Verlag – incidentally the first German language Blueberry book publisher back in the early 1970s – a subsidiary at the time of German media giant Axel Springer SE, for their next publication, "La longue marche" ("The Long March"). The choice for the German publisher was made for their very ambitious international expansion strategy they had in place at that time. Fully subscribing to the publisher's strategy, Charlier not only revitalized his Redbeard and Tanguy et Laverdure comic series – having been equally "devoid of inspiration" for these as well in the 1974-1979 Pilote-era because of the royalties issue – but created the new Western comic, Les Gringos (art by Victor de la Fuente), as well. Yet, for all Charlier's business acumen, he had failed to recognize that Koralle's exuberant expansion drive had essentially been a do-or-die effort on their part. In 1978 Koralle was on the verge of bankruptcy, and a scheme was devised to stave off this fate; international expansion. In the European comics world that was a rather novel idea at the time and Koralle did expand beyond the German border into large parts of Europe with variants of their main publication Zack magazine, with the revived Blueberry as its flagship, accompanied with comic book releases. It did not pay off however, as the holding company already pulled the plug in 1980, leaving Blueberry and the others quite unexpectedly without a publishing home.

It were not only the Blueberry creators that were left in a pickle, as Koralle had managed to convince other well known Franco-Belgian comic artists to switch sides. Aside from Giraud's old mentor Jijé (who, having abandoned his own Jerry Spring Western comic, was now penciling Charlier's revitalized Redbeard and Tanguy et Laverdure), these predominantly concerned artists from publishing house Le Lombard. The most prominent of the latter was Hermann Huppen with his new post-apocalyptic Western Jeremiah for which he had abandoned that other famed 1970s Franco-Belgian Western, Comanche (written by Greg), second only in renown after Blueberry at the time. Tapping into his substantial social Franco-Belgian comic network, Charlier found Jacques de Kezel – a highly influential behind-the-scenes figure of the Belgian comics world at those times, and who had actually gathered the stable of artists for Koralle – willing for Axel Springer to pass the torch to. As a token of goodwill, a relieved Springer, as they now could turn over the current contractual obligations without much further ado, even allowed the French-language version of Zack, Super As, to run for a few issues longer in order to allow as many series as possible to complete their magazine run, which included "La longue marche". De Kezel's new publishing house "Les Nouvelles Editions Internationales S.A." (Novedi) was established in November 1980 with its seat in Brussels, Belgium. Part of their strategy was to forego on a magazine of their own and instead release titles directly in album format, as it was noticed that the serialized comic magazine format had already started to wane in Europe as a format (and actually one of the main reasons for Axel Springer to pull the plug on Koralle), resulting in the advantage of not having to incur the expenses of maintaining magazine editorial offices. Any still existing comic magazine elsewhere, willing to publish serialized comic series after the initial book releases, was merely considered an added bonus.

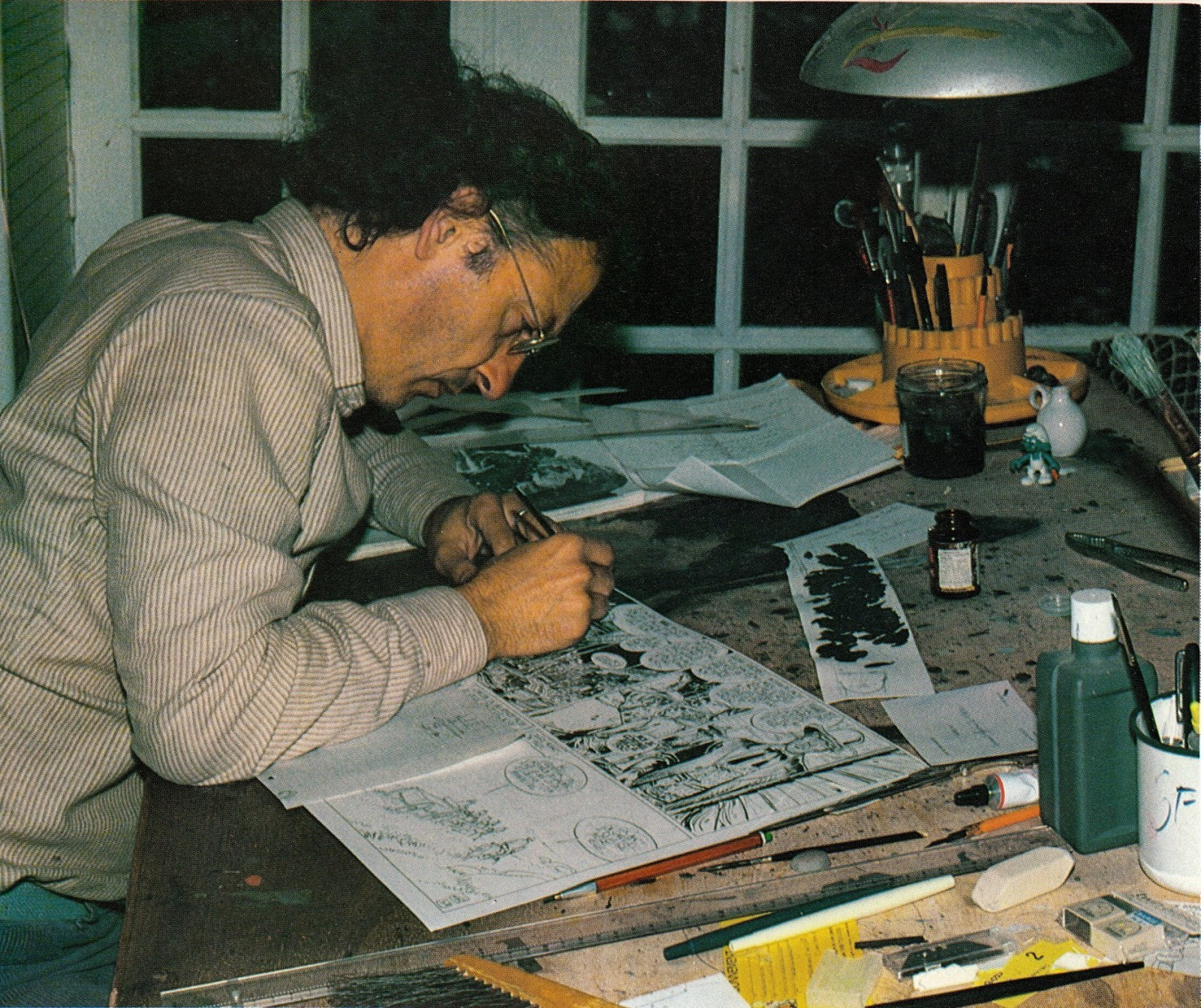
Giraud working on plate 31b of Blueberry volume 20; "La tribu fantôme", ca. 1981

Still, it took some time for the new publisher to get up and running, and some sort of stop-gap resolution had to be found for the intervening 1979-1980 period in order to secure income for the stable of comic artists. On recommendation of Charlier, who has had previous dealings with the publisher, the catalog was legally, but temporarily, housed at the French publishing house Édi-Monde of the Hachette group, who for the occasion established the equally temporary EDI-3-BD imprint, though making use of Koralle's infrastructure – allowed to continue to exist for the time being by Axel Springer – in regard to printing and distribution. As impromptu publisher, EDI-3-BD published around two dozen album titles, including "La longue marche", before turning the copyrights of these over to Novedi, which started publishing themselves in 1981. EDI-3-BD published their books for Belgium and the Netherlands themselves, but farmed out licenses for other countries, including France somewhat surprisingly, where Giraud's former alma mater and Hachette competitor Fleurus firstly became the album publisher for "La longue marche". After Novedi had become operational, the business model was adopted by them and it was decided to continue with Giraud's other alma mater Hachette for France with the subsequent titles in the Blueberry (and other) series in recognition of the help Édi-Monde had provided. Hachette incidentally, later acquired a special, one-time-only license from Dargaud to reissue the entirety of the Blueberry series in 2013-2014 as the 52 volume La Collection Blueberry anthology, each volume augmented with a six-page illustrated editorial.

For a decade Blueberry resided in calm waters at Novedi. The 1980s saw three additions to the main series (completing the Rehabilitation story arc) as well as four new titles in the newly created La Jeunesse de Blueberry series. Nevertheless, despite the two Blueberry incarnations and Jeremiah being the top selling series for the publisher, it appeared that the financial base was too narrow for even a publisher the modest size of Novedi, as the publisher went out of business in 1990, after having published approximately 120 album titles, and despite having taken over the book publications for France themselves as well in the latter half of the decade. It again left Blueberry and the others without a publishing home.

==== Death of a creator (1989) ====
"I have twenty completed pages, the rest consists of annotations and loose ideas...I was not quite on board with the development of the story yet, we still had not decided upon anything. There were some great ideas, which needed to be finalized".

— Giraud, August 1989, on the script status of "Arizona Love" at the time of Charlier's death.

On 10 July 1989, Jean-Michel Charlier died from a heart condition after a short illness. By all accounts Charlier had been a workaholic throughout his career, working simultaneously on as much as a dozen projects at any given time, steadily increasing his workload as he grew older. His heart condition had already troubled him in his later years and his death, while sudden, was not entirely a surprise. Charlier's penchant for hard work increasingly became a concern for Giraud when he visited his longtime co-worker six months before his death: "He was a work bulimic! There were always seven to eight scenarios underway. His life was a true path of self-destruction. You should have seen him working at his desk! Six months before his passing, I advised him to slow down. Very artistically, he replied: No, I have chosen this!"

Charlier, having been of a previous generation, conservative in nature and wary of science fiction in general, had never understood what his younger colleague tried to achieve as "Mœbius". Nonetheless, he never tried to hinder Giraud in the least, as he understood that an artist of Giraud's caliber needed a "mental shower" from time to time. Furthermore, Charlier was very appreciative of the graphic innovations Giraud ported over from his work as "Mœbius" into the mainstream Blueberry series, most specifically "Nez Cassé", making him "one of the all-time greatest artists in the comic medium", as Charlier himself worded it in 1982. Artist Michel Rouge, who was taken on by Giraud in 1980 for the inks of "La longue marche" ("The Long March") painted a slightly different picture though. Already recognizing that the two men were living in different worlds, he noted that Charlier was not pleased with Giraud taking on an assistant, afraid that it might have been a prelude to him leaving the series in order to pursue his "experimentations" as Mœbius further. Even Giraud was in later life led to believe that Charlier apparently "detested" his other work, looking upon it as something akin to "treason", though his personal experiences with the author was that he had kept an "open mind" in this regard, at least in his case. While Charlier was willing to overlook Giraud's wanderings in his case only, he was otherwise of the firm conviction that artists, especially his own, should totally and wholeheartedly devote themselves to their craft – as Charlier always had considered the comic medium – but which was somewhat incongruous on his part as he himself was habitually engaged in several divergent projects at any given time. This has caused many of his artists problems on a frequent basis, as he was consistently and notoriously late with his piecemeal provided script pages, including Giraud at the start of his Blueberry career. However, as he recognized quite early on that Blueberry occupied a special place in his body of work, he later made sure that (only) his Blueberry artists were provided with scripts in a timely fashion. Charlier's method of working came at a cost, as his scripts frequently contained continuity errors on the detail level, and which included those of Blueberry, such as in his above cited instance of his hero's first name. Charlier has cited the Blueberry titles "La mine de l'allemand perdu" ("The Lost Dutchman's Mine") through "L'homme qui valait 500 000 $" ("The Half-a-Million Dollar Man") as his favorites for their "potency", both story and artwise, the latter making him the co-winner of his 1973 American Shazam award.

The script being one-thirds ready at the time of Charlier's passing, the completion of "Arizona Love" was postponed as Giraud needed time to come to terms with that fact. Due to his intimate twenty-five year familiarity with both the series and its writer, it was a foregone conclusion that Giraud would from then on take on the scripting of the main series as well, especially since it was already agreed upon in the "contracts signed with Jean-Michel" that "the survivor would take over the series". It was this circumstance that has led Philippe Charlier, son of the deceased author and now the heir and steward of his father's bande dessinée legacy, to make the unsubstantiated claim that Novedi was surreptitiously negotiating with Giraud only for the existing and future Blueberry series, intent on cutting the Charlier family out, which was incongruous as Novedi was already heading toward receivership, aside from the fact that Giraud has never even hinted at such alleged dealings and that not a single corroborating rumor has ever surfaced elsewhere in the otherwise tight-knit Franco-Belgian comic community, save for the claim Charlier Jr. himself made on that sole occasion in the comic journal BoDoï (issue 24, 1999). Furthermore, per French law, Charlier's widow Christine remained entitled to 10 percent of the revenues from the existing and subsequent post-Charlier Blueberry titles, which provided her with a "decent" living standard, according to son Philippe, effectively contradicting his own claim on the very same occasion. As for Giraud, having to work without a safety net for the first time, came initially with bouts of self-doubt and second-guessing, as Colin Wilson (by then the new La Jeunesse de Blueberry artist) testified to, after a visit to Giraud in this period: "Janet and I visited Jean when he was working on "Arizona Love" – around May 1989 [sic.] I think. Some of the first pages he showed us then were radically different from the ones ultimately published in the album later on. I did not had the time to read the scripts for those pages he had shown us, but I know that Jean redid several pages entirely anew, before the album was eventually released". The by Giraud rejected pages were published as a bonus in the 1995 deluxe limited edition of "Mister Blueberry", a joint publication of Dargaud and Giraud's publishing house Stardom.

Stunned by the sudden death of his longtime co-worker, it took Giraud nearly five years before he could bring himself to embark on Blueberry again as artist, after completing "Arizona Love". Giraud stated that the series had lost its "father", and that the "mother needed time to mourn".

==== Continued publishing wanderings (1990–1993) ====
Charlier's death coincided by chance with the growing problems at Novedi, and Giraud suggested to Philippe Charlier, the heir and steward of his father's legacy, to move all his fathers co-creations to Les Humanoïdes Associés (with whom Giraud maintained close personal and creative ties after his Métal Hurlant days – which had included "Nez Cassé" – among others by having them publish his acclaimed L'Incal series), to step up to the plate vacated by Novedi. Yet, Giraud undertook no further action himself, partly because he was still residing in the United States, too preoccupied with his own projects and the wrapping up of his affairs over there before his return to France (and thus too busy to be engaged in secret negotiations with Novedi), and partly because his marriage to his first wife Claudine was in the early stages of falling apart at the time. Charlier Jr. approached Fabrice Giger, who had bought the by Giraud co-founded publisher previously in early 1989, but did not choose for that publishing house eventually, but rather go with Giger's original, founding publishing house, Alpen Publishers, the latter had set up in 1988 in Switzerland – even though comic artists themselves, due to the close entanglement of Alpen and Humanoïdes, always referred to Alpen as "Humanos" (see quote boxes below). It turned out that Philippe was actually picking up where his father had left off. Around the time he had established Alpen and unbeknownst to Giraud, Giger was already approached by Charlier Sr. in 1988. The veteran Charlier had already sensed the writings on the wall at Novedi and discussed plans with Giger to have all his comic creations moved over to the new publisher, arguably the very reason for the then 23-year old Giger to set up Alpen in the first place, and had to this end already arranged his old friend Guy Vidal from his Pilote days to be hired as editor-in-chief at the new publisher, incidentally in the process doing exactly what his son would later accuse Giraud/Novedi of. Giger disclosed in 2008 that it was on the occasion of his subsequent dealings with Philippe that the "JMC Aventures" foundation was established, intended to safeguard the commercial and artistic legacy of Charlier's body of work. Giger stated: "After the death of Jean-Michel, a project was born between his son, Philippe, his mother, and us, to create a structure dedicated to the continuation of the series co-created by Charlier, JMC Aventures. We were shareholders with the Charlier family", confirming the preliminary dealings with the author in his final year.

The relatively short tenure at Alpen saw the release of "Arizona Love", which was actually started under the aegis of Novedi, but for which Charlier had not yet contracted with the publisher because of his hunch, thus leaving the title legally "free" for JMC Aventures to be signed with Alpen, according to Giger, adding that this had the "full and immediate blessing" from Giraud. The artist himself though, taken completely unawares and having had little choice in the matter, has later expressed a slightly different opinion, where it was implied that he was not as happy with the behind-the-scenes machinations as Giger made it out to be, especially since his late script partner had kept him out of the loop in 1988. Ironically, it was Philippe Charlier himself who indirectly conceded that particular point when he accused Giraud of wanting "to settle scores" with Charlier Sr. with the later OK Corral-cycle, which Philippe had issues with (see below). Additional Alpen releases included the La Jeunesse de Blueberry title "Trois hommes pour Atlanta", as well as the inception of the spin-off series Marshal Blueberry with two titles, aside from additions to the Les Gringos and Redbeard series, taken over by other artists after both Jijé and Charlier Sr. had died. While the initial intention was to have the entire body of work of Charlier published at Alpen, the corporation with the publisher did not pan out for undisclosed reasons – though Giger had mentioned increasingly difficult copyright negotiations with other copyright holders, predominantly heirs of other artists who had worked with Charlier, the widow of Jijé in particular, who had successfully taken Giger and Charlier Jr. to court. The relationship was ended in 1992, shortly thereafter followed by the demise of Alpen itself in 1994 with Guy Vidal moving over, or rather returning, to Dargaud (having taken on the writing for Les Gringos after his friend's death, until his own death in 2002), though Giger himself became successful with Humanoïdes, expanding into the United States as "Humanoids Publishing Ltd." in 1999, in the process reissuing much of Giraud's "Mœbius" science fiction work.

As Belgian publisher Dupuis had already shown interest, when they serialized "La dernière carte" in their Spirou magazine in 1983, Charlier Jr. now decided to try his luck at that publishing house in 1992, as Hermann had already done previously with his Jeremiah for that matter. While Jeremiah has remained with Dupuis ever since, for again unknown reasons the cooperation with Blueberry did not seem to pan out either. Even though Dupuis did reissue all the (Young) Blueberry titles of the EDI-3-BD/Novedi era (but none from Alpen Publishers, or indeed any of the other Charlier creations) under its own imprint in their "Repérages" collection, no new titles were released during the equally short 1992-1993 tenure of Blueberry at that publisher.

==== Return to the parent publisher (1993–present) ====
"Everything was bought back by Dargaud, halfway through [Marshal Blueberry]. It was not that bad; At Dargaud, they are more active on the editorial level. During the entire time I was at Humanos, I had not received a single call to start a new project. I profited from it... life profited from it for that matter... If Blueberry had remained with Humanos, there still would not have been a new album! At Dargaud, the late Guy Vidal became a true series editor-in-chief, active, pugnacious, committed to continuous series. When I did ask to start, along came Mister Blueberry, followed suit by Tombstone and Geronimo... I do the best I can. I'm not saying it's all entirely successful. I do recognize that there are some surprising issues at the script or drawing level, but it has the merit of not being routine!"

— Giraud, 2010, on the return to Dargaud, being the sole artist on Blueberry, and somewhat contradicting his prior 1993 statement

Tiring of Giraud's inaction, Philippe Charlier ultimately took matters into his own hand, and had all his father's co-creations return to parent publisher Dargaud at the end of 1993 without apparent objections from Giraud (though he had stipulated an exemption for non-comic Blueberry art, produced either on personal title and/or for his own publishing houses Gentiane/Aedena, Starwatcher Graphics, and Stardom – see below), and it is there where Blueberry has remained ever since. The for Dargaud joyous occasion of now having acquired the copyrights of all Blueberry comic incarnations, was reason enough to ask Giraud – now serving as the sole main series artist – to embark on a new story-arc, which eventually resulted in the OK Corral cycle, the last one of the main series as it turned out to be. How thrilled Dargaud was to have reacquired Blueberry was amply demonstrated – aside from their decision to revitalize the serialized pre-publication format for Blueberry as already mentioned – in the 2000 documentary Mister Gir & Mike S. Blueberry made on the occasion of the release of "Geronimo l'Apache", in which instances were shown of the considerable marketing efforts the publisher undertook in order to promote the new album – the documentary therefore itself one such instance – among others by having many Parisian metro stations plastered with huge Blueberry posters. Aside from this, Dargaud made use of the opportunity to clean up the by then muddied release chronology, by formalizing the establishment of the three series and restarting the album numbering for each in reprint runs. Concurrently, all international licenses were renegotiated.

Apart from foreign language publishers and constituting a break in tradition, Dargaud also started to occasionally farm out special, one-time only, series licenses to other Francophone publishers, which besides the aforementioned 2013/14 with editorial pages enhanced all-series "La Collection Blueberry" from Hachette, already included the French book club France Loisirs for its 2003 main series releases. Another Francophone publisher who was granted a special license for the main series only was the French-Belgian newspaper Le Soir who released its "Blueberry Intégrale" in two editions, the fifteen-volume edition of 2009, and the sixteen-volume edition of 2015. Like the France Loisirs release, each volume, save three in the end, collected two of the original albums and was only offered to newspaper readers and subscribers. The three single album volumes (No's 8, 15 and 16) were augmented with new Blueberry art, featured in a separate section and separately negotiated for with Giraud's own publisher, Mœbius Production. Nor were the one-time only special licenses limited to Francophone publishers alone; twice Italian La Gazzetta dello Sport newspaper acquired one as well for their 2014/16 overall genre 90-volume softcover "Collana Western" (encompassing 51 titles of the three Blueberry series), and their 2022/23 Blueberry-specific 54-volume hardcover followup "Collana Blueberry" releases – though in both cases lacking the editorials. A similar license has followed suit when one was extended to Spanish publisher Planeta DeAgostini, in conjuncture with partwork specialist Ediciones Altaya, for their 2017/19 54-volume "Blueberry Edición Coleccionista", very similar in concept to the earlier Hachette collection, but with the editorials written by Spanish comics author/historian Jorge Garcia. In a very rare case of cross-fertilization, Altaya started in 2021 to release an into French translated version of the "Edición Coleccionista" on the French home market as the "Edition Collector", at a time when reprint runs of individual titles were all but terminated on the home market for reasons explained below.

Jean-Michel Charlier has never witnessed the return of his creations to the parent publisher, nor has he ever mended fences with George Dargaud – for whose publishing house Charlier had made signature contributions after all – and who followed Charlier in death almost to the day one year later on July 18, 1990. To a large extent the publication wanderings of Blueberry has been mirrored in other European countries as well, particularly in Germany (where the era was referred to as "Der 'heimatlose' Blueberry" – "The 'homeless' Blueberry") and the Scandinavian countries (the Danes referring to the era as "Blueberrys Lange March" – "Blueberry's Long March"), where every publisher change was followed suit by similar changes among local publishers in those territories as well. How confusing this era had been, was exemplified by the aforementioned "La longue marche" title, which has been released in French by no less than six publishers in the time period 1980–2003, or even seven, if one is to include the Super As serialized magazine publication as well.

Though the 2007 "Apaches" title became the last in the main Blueberry series, as creating comics became increasingly difficult for Giraud because his eyesight started to fail him in his last years, he did continue to create single-piece Blueberry art on larger canvases on either commission basis (such as for the aforementioned Le Soir editions) or under the aegis of Mœbius Production until his own death in 2012, much of which sold for considerable prices from 2005 onward, alongside older original Blueberry art Giraud still had in his possession, in specialized comic auctions at such auction houses like Artcurial, Hôtel Drouot and Millon & Associés.

==== The commemorative omnibus collection series (2012–2019) ====
"About 2,000 copies of each title are sold every year. It's pretty good, although there has been unfortunately nothing new since "Dust", the 28th volume published seven years ago".

— Philippe Ostermann, Deputy Managing Director Dargaud, December 2012, on the lack of the economic incentive for releasing a general "intégrale" on the Francophone market before Giraud's death.

Shortly after Jean Giraud had died on 10 March 2012 as well, Dargaud embarked in November that year on the release of the Blueberry main series 9-volume "Intégrale" anthology/omnibus collection, completed in December 2019. Though there had been several (international) "Intégrale" versions released before, this version, each volume collecting either three or four individual volumes of the main series, was intended to become the definitive one and each volume was greatly enhanced with elaborate and richly illustrated editorials, written by France's preeminent comics scholars such as José-Louis Bocquet, Patrick Gaumer or Gilles Ratier, among others. It quickly evolved into an international release as it has by 2023 become translated into Danish, Dutch, Finnish, German, (Brazilian) Portuguese, Serbo-Croatian, Spanish, and Swedish. Launched in 2019, the German and Danish editions were remarkable in this respect in that these countries had already seen their aforementioned and relatively recent 2006-2011/17 Egmont omnibus editions (which had themselves already been quite elaborate as well), constituting an enduring testament to the continuing popularity of Giraud's Blueberry in those countries, Germany in particular.

It turned out a half year later that such a collection had already been in the works in conjuncture with Giraud himself prior to his death, but not as a general release as eventually realized, but rather as a to 10–12,000 copies one-time-only limited "collector's edition" Francophone market exclusive. As Dargaud deputy manager Philippe Ostermann had explained in the quote box on the right, an economic necessity for a general intégrale release had not yet materialized by the time Giraud died. After Giraud's death though and pursuant securing the blessings of both his and Charlier's heirs, it was decided with the upcoming fiftieth anniversary of the series in mind to turn the project into a general release after all, which effectively terminated the reprint runs of the individual volumes of the main series in each of the language territories where the collection was released, save for the aforementioned unique special license releases – in some countries, such as Finland, the Netherlands and Sweden, individual volume reprint runs of the main series had already been suspended indefinitely long before the release in those territories of the intégrale edition. The German edition of the collection, carries the subtitle "Collector's Edition", as a reminder of the original intent of the collection, aside from distinguishing it from their Egmont edition. However though, and just as had been the case with the Egmont edition (see below), a glaring omission in the Dargaud collection remained the "Three Black Birds" short story, excepting a single page for illustrative purposes in the editorial of volume 8 only. That Isabelle Giraud had chosen not sign off on the collection publication of that story as a whole had everything to do with the intense, below-explained animosity she harbored towards Philippe Charlier.

In 2017, a Marshal Blueberry intégrale, collecting the three individual volumes of the intermezzo mini-series, was additionally released by Dargaud, likewise seeing several international translations. Though similarly executed, it was not released as part of 2012 intégrale series, but rather as a stand-alone, or Hors Séries (HS – "outside the series"), release. Furthermore, it also lacked any editorials – which ironically made the earlier corresponding Egmont release from 2006 the superior one, as that volume did feature editorials.

=== English translations ===
The first known English translation of Blueberry was that of the first title "Fort Navajo", and appeared 18 months after its original 1963 French magazine publication and before its first album publication in September 1965. The first outing in the series was serialized in syndication through Charlier's own EdiFrance/EdiPresse agency (albeit on behalf of his employer Dargaud and the only Blueberry title known to have been disseminated in this manner outside Francophone Europe, Spain and Portugal) under its original title in the weekly British comic magazine Valiant, starting its edited and truncated black and white run in issue 15 May 1965 through issue 21 August 1965, fifteen issues in total. Together with the near-simultaneous and similar publication of the story in Dutch (in full and in color in Fix en Fox magazine, issues 26-41, 1965), both actually stand out as the first known non-French publications of Blueberry, or of any other work by Giraud (but not Charlier) for that matter. However, the growing popularity of the comic elsewhere in Europe from 1967 onward notwithstanding, the Netherlands included, "Fort Navajo" remained until 1977 the only Blueberry title translated in English.

The first four English album translations of Blueberry comics were published in Europe for release in the UK in the late seventies by Danish/British joint venture Egmont/Methuen, when Egmont, holding an international license at the time, was in the process of releasing the series on a wider, international scale, for Germany and the Scandinavian countries in particular. While Egmont completed the publication of the then existing series in whole for the latter two language areas, publication of the English titles already ceased after volume 4. Parent publisher Dargaud had planned to reissue these titles and more in translation for the North-American market in 1982/83 through their short-lived Dargaud International Publishing, Ltd. Canadian branch, but of these, only one was eventually released. That then unnoticed title, "The Man with the Silver Star", has, despite the fact that Giraud's art style had by now fully blossomed into his distinctive own, not been included in later North American collections, resulting in the album becoming an expensive rarity.

"There were thousands of professionals who knew my work. That has always amazed me every time I entered some graphics, or animation studio, at Marvel or even at George Lucas'. Mentioning the name Jean Giraud did not cause any of the present pencillers, colorists or storyboard artists to even bat an eye. Yet, whenever I introduced myself as "Mœbius", all of them jumped up to shake my hand. It was incredible!"

— Giraud, 1989, on his notoriety as "Mœbius" in the United States.

Since then better marketed English translations were published by other companies which included Marvel Comics (under its Epic imprint), Comcat, Mojo Press and Dark Horse Comics, resulting in all kinds of formats and quality—from b/w, American comic book sized budget collections to full color European graphic novel style albums with many extras. Actually this was the first time Blueberry was published under Giraud's pseudonym, Moebius. As Randy and Jean-Marc Lofficier, the translator couple for all these editions, related: "This is quite ironic because Giraud first coined the 'Moebius' pseudonym precisely because he wanted to keep his two bodies of work separate. Yet, the artist recognizes the fact that he has now become better known in this country under his 'nom-de-plume' and this is his way of making it official!" In effect, the ploy was more than opportune, as Epic had already started out with the publication of Giraud's better known science fiction work under his pseudonym – introduced to American readership through Heavy Metal in the mid-1970s – in the graphic novel format, and it was only when these were well underway that it was decided to add Blueberry as well to the array. All Giraud/Moebius titles were released by Epic in a for the US relatively modest print run of 20.000 copies per title. To make the project as economically viable as possible, it was decided to collect two of the original Blueberry titles in one book, to justify the by Americans perceived high price of around US$13, which, excepting the first two titles of the "Iron Horse" story-arc, made the Epic releases in essence "intégrales" themselves. Giraud conceded that the Blueberry series, due to the sharply diminished interest in the Western genre in the country at the time and contrary to his similarly released Sci-Fi and fantasy work as Mœbius by Epic, were very slow sellers in the US, though the entire printing did manage to eventually sell out over the years. In addition to citing the Americans' complete and absolute obsession with the "Superhero" genres, Giraud has also remarked a few years later, "One cannot say that the results were all that convincing. Jean-Marc Lofficier did of course a fine job in convincing Marvel to reissue Blueberry in the States, but it was above all a matter of prestige. In hindsight, I think today that it might have stood a better chance if the Blueberry plates had seen daily publication in the pages of the Herald Tribune or Los Angeles Times, which is of course a perfectly utopian notion. The recognition of all the work signed with "Mœbius" on the other hand, is total."

It was for Epic that Giraud created new Blueberry book cover art (which he had only done once previously for the first four German album releases by Koralle, nor would he ever again), and to the chagrin of parent publisher Dargaud this art – as is indeed all outside the main comics proper Blueberry art, such as magazine covers, art portfolios, posters and the like, that Giraud created in this period of time for Koralle, Les Humanoïdes Associés, as well as his own publishing houses Gentiane, Starwatcher Graphics, Stardom and the subsequent Moebius Production remain outside the legal purview of Dargaud, even after they had reacquired the Blueberry copyrights in 1993. In practice this means that Dargaud can not use this art at will for their own later publications, such as the 2012 anthology releases, without coming to some sort of legal and financial arrangement with the copyright holders – i.e. Giraud himself in the vast majority of cases (as of 2012, his heirs and with whom Dargaud apparently had, as some non-Dargaud controlled art has been published in the last three volumes of the 2012 anthology release) – as Dargaud licensees have to do as well on individual basis, and of which the short story "Three Black Birds" is the most glaring and, for fans, the most painful one (see below – Dargaud had only been able to secure a few excerpts for publication in the eighth volume of their 2012 release). German author Martin Jürgeit (co-author of the below-listed reference book) has confirmed being confronted with this when he served as editor-in-chief for the German-language version of Egmont's earlier mentioned anthology collection. Dead set on having all available Blueberry material included in his version, he found himself frequently frustrated in this regard on more than one occasion. He stated as late as 2012: "As things now stand, it is highly unlikely that the vast majority of this material will be included, as Dargaud does not own the copyrights. And it is only the Dargaud copyrighted material we can use for the Blueberry-Chroniken, as we have experienced to our dismay on several occasions", referring among others, aside from "Three Black Birds", to the covers for Epic as well. On the other hand, Jürgeit was allowed to incorporate all Blueberry art Giraud had created exclusively for Koralle, which Dargaud was not for their 2012 release.

The Epic publications were very shortly after their initial release collected by American specialty publisher Graphitti Designs in their "Moebius" collection – for whom Giraud created new book plate art, also outside the legal purview of Dargaud – a deluxe limited edition anthology collection, released in a 1500 copies per volume edition, each volume at least containing two of the Epic releases. The collection, which ran for nine volumes, also contained Giraud's science fiction body of work, that was concurrently released by Epic in a similar manner. Volume Moebius #9, containing "The Lost Dutchman's Mine" and "The Ghost with the Golden Bullets", also included the non-Blueberry westerns "King of the Buffalo" (short), and the other Giraud/Charlier western strip, Jim Cutlass: "Mississippi River". Excepting the 1996 Mojo Press release, no additional Blueberry comics have been published in English since 1993, and, again excepting the Mojo Press release, no English Blueberry reprints have seen the light of day either, contrary to his other work as "Moebius".

The Epic collection earned Giraud his below listed American 1991 comic award, augmented with an additional 1997 award nomination for the Mojo Press release, whereas Blueberry in general had already earned him two American comic awards in 1972 and 1973, long before the series had even come to the attention of North-American readership.

Table of English translations of the original French titles in chronological story order
#	French title (original magazine publication)	French original album release (publisher, yyyy/mm, ISBN^{1})	English saga title/French story arc	English title and data	Notes
0(29)	Apaches (n/a)	Dargaud, 2007/10, ISBN 9782205060799	one-shot (Lieutenant Blueberry)^{2}	not translated	"0"-Volume in France, Volume 29 for other countries.
1	Fort Navajo (Pilote, issues 210–232, Dargaud, 1963/64)	Dargaud, 1965/09, n/a	Lieutenant Blueberry/Fort Navajo aka 1st Navajo Cycle series	Fort Navajo (Valiant, issues 15 May-21 August, IPC Magazines, 1965^{3}; Egmont/Methuen, December 1977, ISBN 041605370X; Dargaud, 1983)	Albums printed in Belgium for the UK market.; English translations by Anthea Bell and Derek Hockridge.; France printed Dargaud editions, intended for the US and British Canada, were projected for 1982/83 but ultimately canceled. French Canada has traditionally been served with the original French publications.; European standard size softcover graphic novel format.
2	Tonnerre à l'ouest (Pilote, issues 236–258, Dargaud, 1964)	Dargaud, 1966/01, n/a	Lieutenant Blueberry/Fort Navajo aka 1st Navajo Cycle series	Thunder in the West (Egmont/Methuen, October 1977, ISBN 0416054307; Dargaud, 1982)	Albums printed in Belgium for the UK market.; English translations by Anthea Bell and Derek Hockridge.; France printed Dargaud editions, intended for the US and British Canada, were projected for 1982/83 but ultimately canceled. French Canada has traditionally been served with the original French publications.; European standard size softcover graphic novel format.
3	L'aigle solitaire (Pilote, issues 261–285, Dargaud, 1964)	Dargaud, 1967/01 n/a	Lieutenant Blueberry/Fort Navajo aka 1st Navajo Cycle series	Lone Eagle, (Egmont/Methuen, December 1978, ISBN 0416050301; Dargaud, 1982)	Albums printed in Belgium for the UK market.; English translations by Anthea Bell and Derek Hockridge.; France printed Dargaud editions, intended for the US and British Canada, were projected for 1982/83 but ultimately canceled. French Canada has traditionally been served with the original French publications.; European standard size softcover graphic novel format.
4	Le cavalier perdu (Pilote, issues 288–311, Dargaud, 1965)	Dargaud, 1968/01, n/a	Lieutenant Blueberry/Fort Navajo aka 1st Navajo Cycle series	Mission to Mexico (Egmont/Methuen, December 1978, ISBN 0416050409), The Lost Rider (Dargaud, 1983)	Albums printed in Belgium for the UK market.; English translations by Anthea Bell and Derek Hockridge.; France printed Dargaud editions, intended for the US and British Canada, were projected for 1982/83 but ultimately canceled. French Canada has traditionally been served with the original French publications.; European standard size softcover graphic novel format.
5	La piste des Navajos (Pilote, issues 313–335, Dargaud, 1965)	Dargaud, 1969/01, n/a	Lieutenant Blueberry/Fort Navajo aka 1st Navajo Cycle series	Trail of the Navajo (Dargaud, 1983)^{4}	canceled/not translated^{5}
6	L'homme à l'étoile d'argent (Pilote, issues 337–360, Dargaud, 1966)	Dargaud, 1969/10, n/a	Lieutenant Blueberry/one-shot^{6}	The Man with the Silver Star (Dargaud International Publishing, Ltd, 1983/Q2, ISBN 2205065785)	Printed and published by the mother publisher in France for the US and British Canadian markets, hence the French ISBN as per French copyright laws.; Of the six titles originally projected, the only one actually released.; English translation by R. Whitener.; European standard size softcover graphic novel format.
7	Le cheval de fer (Pilote, issues 370–392, Dargaud, 1966)	Dargaud, 1970/01, n/a	Lieutenant Blueberry/Iron Horse series	The Iron Horse (Epic, February 1991, ISBN 0871357402; Moebius #8, Graphitti Designs, 1991, ISBN 0936211350)	Graphitti Designs release erroneously carrying the same ISBN as Volume 9
8	L'homme au poing d'acier (Pilote, issues 397–419, Dargaud, 1967)	Dargaud, 1970/03, n/a	Lieutenant Blueberry/Iron Horse series	Steel Fingers (Epic, 1991, ISBN 0871357410; Moebius #8, Graphitti Designs, 1991)	All Epic/Titan Books releases American standard size softcover graphic novel format.; Graphitti Designs releases European standard size hardcover graphic novel format in dust jacket.
9	La piste des Sioux (Pilote, issues 427–449, Dargaud, 1967)	Dargaud, 1971/01, n/a	Lieutenant Blueberry/Iron Horse series	General Golden Mane (Epic, 1991, ISBN 0871357429; Moebius #8, Graphitti Designs, 1991)	Two chapters in one book: Chapter title: "The Trail of the Sioux"; Chapter title same as book title.
10	Général tête jaune (Pilote, issues 453–476, Dargaud, 1968)	Dargaud, 1971/10, n/a	Lieutenant Blueberry/Iron Horse series	General Golden Mane (Epic, 1991, ISBN 0871357429; Moebius #8, Graphitti Designs, 1991)	Two chapters in one book: Chapter title: "The Trail of the Sioux"; Chapter title same as book title.
11	La mine de l'allemand perdu (Pilote, issues 497–519, Dargaud, 1969)	Dargaud, 1972/01, n/a	Marshal Blueberry/Goldmine series	The Lost Dutchman's Mine (Epic, 1991, ISBN 0871357437; Moebius #9, Graphitti Designs, 1991, ISBN 0936211350)^{7}	Two chapters in one book: Chapter title same as book.; Chapter title: "The Ghost with the Golden Bullets"
12	Le spectre aux balles d'or (Pilote, issues 532–557, Dargaud, 1970)	Dargaud, 1972/07, n/a	Marshal Blueberry/Goldmine series	The Lost Dutchman's Mine (Epic, 1991, ISBN 0871357437; Moebius #9, Graphitti Designs, 1991, ISBN 0936211350)^{7}	"King of the Buffalo" (non-Blueberry short, 10 p.)
13	Chihuahua Pearl (Pilote, issues 566–588, Dargaud, 1970)	Dargaud, 1973/01, n/a	Blueberry/Confederate Gold series	Chihuahua Pearl (Epic, June 1989, ISBN 0871355698; Moebius #4, Graphitti Designs, 1989, ISBN 0936211202; Titan Books, September 1989, ISBN 1852861908^{8}; Mojo Press, July 1996, ISBN 1885418086)	Two chapters in one book: Chapter title same as book.; Chapter title: "The Half-a-Million Dollar Man".
14	L'homme qui valait $500 000 (Pilote, issues 605–627, Dargaud, 1971)	Dargaud, 1973/07, n/a	Blueberry/Confederate Gold series	Chihuahua Pearl (Epic, June 1989, ISBN 0871355698; Moebius #4, Graphitti Designs, 1989, ISBN 0936211202; Titan Books, September 1989, ISBN 1852861908^{8}; Mojo Press, July 1996, ISBN 1885418086)	The first time the Fort Navajo moniker has been dropped from the series (sub-)title by the French parent publisher.
15	Ballade pour un cercueil (Pilote, issues 647–679, Dargaud, 1972)	Dargaud, 1974/01, n/a	Blueberry/Confederate Gold series	Ballad for a Coffin (Epic, 1989, ISBN 0871355701; Moebius #4, Graphitti Designs, 1989; Titan Books, November 1989, ISBN 1852861916; Mojo Press, July 1996, ISBN 1885418086)	Two chapters in one book.: Chapter title same as book.; Chapter title: "The Outlaw"
16	Le hors-la-loi (Pilote, issues 700–720, Dargaud, 1973, as "L'outlaw")^{9}	Dargaud, 1974/10, n/a	Blueberry/Conspiracy series	Ballad for a Coffin (Epic, 1989, ISBN 0871355701; Moebius #4, Graphitti Designs, 1989; Titan Books, November 1989, ISBN 1852861916; Mojo Press, July 1996, ISBN 1885418086)	"The Words of Chief Seattle" (non-Blueberry short, 3 p.)
17	Angel Face (Nouveau Tintin, issues 1–9, Le Lombard, 1975)	Dargaud, 1975/07, ISBN 2205009109	Blueberry/Conspiracy series	Angel Face (Epic, 1989, ISBN 087135571X; Moebius #5, Graphitti Designs, 1990, ISBN 0936211210; Titan Books, January 1990, ISBN 1852861924; Mojo Press – "Angel Face" only –, July 1996, ISBN 1885418086)	Two chapters in one book.: Chapter title same as book.; Chapter title: "Broken Nose"
18	Nez Cassé (Métal Hurlant, issues 38–40, Les Humanoïdes Associés, 1979)	Dargaud, 1980/01, ISBN 2205016369	Blueberry/Fugitive aka 2nd Navajo Cycle series	Angel Face (Epic, 1989, ISBN 087135571X; Moebius #5, Graphitti Designs, 1990, ISBN 0936211210; Titan Books, January 1990, ISBN 1852861924; Mojo Press – "Angel Face" only –, July 1996, ISBN 1885418086)	Two chapters in one book.: Chapter title same as book.; Chapter title: "Broken Nose"
19	La longue marche (Super As, issues 69–72, 85–87, Koralle, 1980)	Fleurus/EDI-3-BD, 1980/10, ISBN 2215003650^{10}	Blueberry/Fugitive aka 2nd Navajo Cycle series	The Ghost Tribe (Epic, January 1990, ISBN 0871355809; Moebius #5, Graphitti Designs, 1990; Titan Books, March 1990, ISBN 1852861932)	Two chapters in one book.: Chapter title: "The Long March"; Chapter title same as book.
20	La tribu fantôme (L'echo des savannes, issues 81–83, Les Éditions du Fromage, 1981)	Hachette/Novedi, 1982/03, ISBN 2010087356	Blueberry/Fugitive aka 2nd Navajo Cycle series	The Ghost Tribe (Epic, January 1990, ISBN 0871355809; Moebius #5, Graphitti Designs, 1990; Titan Books, March 1990, ISBN 1852861932)	Two chapters in one book.: Chapter title: "The Long March"; Chapter title same as book.
21	La dernière carte (Spirou, issues 2380–2383, Dupuis, 1983)	Hachette/Novedi, 1983/11, ISBN 2010096835	Blueberry/Rehabilitation series	The End of the Trail (Epic, 1990, ISBN 0871355817; Moebius #5, Graphitti Designs, 1990; Titan Books, May 1990, ISBN 1852861940)	Two chapters in one book: Chapter title: "The Last Card"; Chapter title same as book.
22	Le bout de la piste (n/a)	Novedi, 1986/09, ISBN 2803900343	Blueberry/Rehabilitation series	The End of the Trail (Epic, 1990, ISBN 0871355817; Moebius #5, Graphitti Designs, 1990; Titan Books, May 1990, ISBN 1852861940)	Two chapters in one book: Chapter title: "The Last Card"; Chapter title same as book.
23	A – Arizona Love (France Soir, 10 July-12 September 1990)	Alpen, 1990/10, ISBN 2731607793	Mister Blueberry/one-shot^{11}	Arizona Love (Cheval Noir, issues 46–50, Dark Horse Comics, September 1993-January 1994)	Divided into 5 chapters: Black and white, American current size comic book format.
23	B – Three Black Birds (n/a)	Stardom, 1995, n/a	Mister Blueberry/one-shot^{11}	The Blueberry Saga #1: The Confederate Gold (Mojo Press, July 1996, ISBN 1885418086)^{12}	Chapter title: "Three Black Birds"; 14-page black and white short Arizona Love sequel, American current size comic book format.
24	Mister Blueberry (n/a)	Dargaud, 1995/11, ISBN 2205044605	(n/a)/OK Corral^{13} aka Mister Blueberry series^{14}	not translated^{5}	
25	Ombres sur Tombstone (Le Monde, 15 July-8 August, Groupe Le Monde, 1997)	Dargaud, 1997/11, ISBN 2205046179	(n/a)/OK Corral^{13} aka Mister Blueberry series^{14}	not translated^{5}	
26	Geronimo l'Apache (BoDoï, issues 22–24, LZ Publications, 1999)	Dargaud, 1999/10, ISBN 2205048732	(n/a)/OK Corral^{13} aka Mister Blueberry series^{14}	not translated^{5}	
27	OK Corral (L'Express, issues 2712–2721, SFR Presse, 2003)	Dargaud, 2003/09, ISBN 2205053388	(n/a)/OK Corral^{13} aka Mister Blueberry series^{14}	not translated^{5}	
28	Dust (n/a)	Dargaud, 2005/03, ISBN 2205056425	(n/a)/OK Corral^{13} aka Mister Blueberry series^{14}	not translated^{5}	

- ^{1} According to Bedetheque.com, the French albums were until volume 18 published in simultaneous conjuncture with Belgian publisher Le Lombard who released these for French-Belgium, initially as soft cover editions, contrary to Dargaud who released these from the start as hard cover albums. The same also held true for the first three Young Blueberry titles, then part of the main series. For expedience sake only the French editions from the parent publisher are mentioned. ISBNs were not issued until 1975, the Lombard releases actually never receiving any.
- ^{2} The 2007 one-shot "Apaches" is an edited album collecting the flashback recollections Blueberry related from "Ombres sur Tombstone" through "Dust" to a journalist while convalescing from a gunshot wound he had sustained in the preceding story, detailing how he, after the war and suffering from a severe case of post traumatic stress syndrome, arrives in the South West in late autumn 1865, and his subsequent dealings with Apache warrior Goyaałé, before the latter came to national attention as Geronimo. There it was revealed that it had been Geronimo who had given Blueberry his Native-American nickname "Tsi-Na-Pah" ("Broken Nose"). For the album Giraud created new pages and panels to improve the flow of the story, and as such the album is readable as a stand-alone prequel title. Notable are the new, last two pages which shows Blueberry leaving his first Far West posting, while wearing the outfit, he is first seen in, in "Fort Navajo", his second posting, providing a seamless continuity (even though Giraud had made a continuity error as one of the panels featured a tombstone engraved with 1881, the year in which the OK Corral story arc, centered around the historical "Gunfight at the O.K. Corral" incident, was set). While the French themselves consider the album outside the main series ("Hors-Séries", the "HS" or "0"-volume) due to the prequel nature of the album story, it is otherwise universally considered part of the main series as volume 29 in other countries.
- ^{3} IPC Magazines did not employ numbering for their magazine publications at the time, including Valiant.
- ^{4} The failure to publish "La piste des Navajos" in the English language, frustratingly left English readers with an unresolved cliffhanger, as it was the resolution of a five volume story arc that started with "Fort Navajo". As of 2025, only foreign language editions have been available to them.
- ^{5} In 2020, the entirety of the main (including "Trail of the Navajo" and "Three Black Birds"), Young Blueberry, and Mister Blueberry series, saw an English language softcover album release by the independent micro publisher "Tom Is Jerry Books". A non-profit organization based out of Munich, Germany. The publisher publishes since 2020 the triannual Pingo Magazine that specializes in contemporary art and mindfulness, with European comics, including Blueberry, as recent Pingo Magazine "special edition" additions of interest. German and English are chosen as lingua franca for the (print-on-demand-only) albums, but are exclusively sold on an extremely limited basis through some online, museum, and art bookstores in a few selected western European cities with the single New York City, US, bookstore Printed Matter, Inc., as the only one located in an English-language territory.
- ^{6} While it is above stated by Lofficier that Blueberry is not about a handsome cowboy who "rides into town, saves the ranch, becomes the new sheriff and marries the schoolmarm", the sixth, stand-alone title "The Man with the Silver Star" is ironically exactly that. Moreover, the story was clearly a take on Howard Hawk's classic 1959 Western Rio Bravo, a circumstance not lost on the passionate Western fan Giraud, who confronted Charlier with the similarities: "I have never understood why Charlier has written it. I talked to him about it, but it seemed he was not aware of it; he has never been one for cinema. He must have had unconsciously remembered the movie, and apparently completely suppressed the memory of it. You know, these things happen, and one can not automatically assume plagiarism. As the theme of Rio Bravo is so incredibly strong, it is hard to forget, even if you have forgotten the movie itself". Giraud paid homage to the movie by having the main cast appear in a few background cameos. The assertions of Giraud notwithstanding, the potential for plagiarism allegations explained why this title was left out by Epic for their series publication, despite the already mentioned fact that Giraud's art style was by now fully his own. Still, "The Man with the Silver Star" has remained the only Blueberry title purely patterned after the template as set by the classic American Western genre.
- ^{7} As the title already suggested, "The Lost Dutchman's Mine" was a take on the real world "Lost Dutchman's Gold Mine legend", and in the original publications the Lückner and "Prosit" characters were from Prussia as specifically intended by Charlier, and as indicated by the "Allemand" (French for "German") reference in the French album title, therefore adhering to the actual legend in this respect. Translator Lofficier chose the for Americans familiar-sounding name of the real legend as title for the American book release, but changed the characters to being denizens from the Netherlands, in the process changing the original expletives from German to Dutch in his translations, aside from altering the German name spellings accordingly. Though Lofficier, married to a US citizen, had worked for decades in the US in the publishing world, acquiring an excellent knowledge of American English and idiom, he had made a mistake when he interpreted the moniker "Dutch" as currently – and originally – understood, too literally – as in from/of the Netherlands. Being of French descent, Lofficier had not realized that in the United States of the mid-to-late 19th century, the expression "Dutch" has had a different meaning (Charlier, who was aware of this, had by that time already died, and thus unable to set Lofficier straight), as it was by Americans invariably employed to refer to people and language of German descent/origin, due to the massive influx of German speaking immigrants in that period of time. These immigrants referred to themselves as "Deutch" in their own language, and the phonetic similarity is the more commonly accepted rationale for the phenomenon, and it was not until the turn of the century that "Dutch" regained its original meaning. The phenomenon has not applied for Canada.
- ^{8} In the case of Epic's "Chihuahua Pearl", "Ballad for a Coffin", "Angel Face", "The Ghost Tribe", and "The End of the Trail" book releases, Titan Books has issued the same, virtually identical books (save for the ISBNs and publisher's logo) for the UK market, with a few months delay. The other Epic Blueberry titles only saw a US release, the Titan editions thereby becoming the last British Blueberry publications. These editions were released in a relatively modest print run of 6.000 copies per title, as Giraud himself has divulged, though he has added: "Mind you, British readers were delighted; As a matter of fact, they adore [continental] European comics, which we had not quite recognized over here [France] at the time...".
- ^{9} "Le hors-la-loi" literally translates as "'The one outside the law", in meaning exactly the same as "L'outlaw". France however, is one of the few remaining European countries where the use of anglicisms is actively discouraged and combated by cultural authorities, resulting in the use of the more laborious expression as the album title.
- ^{10} Volumes 19-21 were in France and French-Belgium simultaneously released by two different publishers, albeit under the same ISBN. The French publisher is listed first.
- ^{11} After Blueberry's rehabilitation in "Le bout de la piste", Charlier had planned to have him return to the US Army as captain, heading a unit of Apache Scouts. After Charlier's death, Giraud became of different mind when he embarked on the OK Corral story arc, turning the hero in to a loafing civilian, because of his new-found wealth and spending his days with poker, as he felt that it would have been too illogical and too implausible for Blueberry to return to the very same organization that had caused him so much grief and injustice.
- ^{12} Mojo Press published a black and white, American comic book sized budget collection: The Blueberry Saga #1: The Confederate Gold in 1996. It contains the following stories: "Chihuahua Pearl", "The Half-A-Million Dollar Man", "Ballad for a Coffin", "The Outlaw", "Angel Face". It also featured the first-time book publication worldwide of the 14-page Blueberry short, "Three Black Birds" – the year previously released under the same title as a limited edition, 28-sheet mini portfolio by Stardom, Giraud's own publishing house – which was actually set directly after the events depicted in "Arizona Love", though that title was not included in the anthology. As the title already implied, the book was coined after the actual, so-called "Confederate gold myth". When introduced at the April 1996 WonderCon, copies sold at the convention came with a separate ex-libris, some of which signed by the artist. A staple in the European comic scene as a collector's item, it was not recognized as such by contemporary American buyers who were at the time utterly unfamiliar with the phenomenon. As the ex-libris featured blown-up interior art instead of original art, many of them mistook it, the unsigned ones in particular, as a discardable commercial insert, something American (magazine) readers were very much familiar with. As a result, only a handful of copies of the ex-libris have survived, becoming therefore very rare collectibles, prized by European collectors in particular.
- ^{13} There is a chronology gap of eight years between "Arizona Love" and "Mister Blueberry", which was specifically intended by Giraud: "Mister Blueberry takes place eight years later, which leaves room for further romantic speculations. Surely, many readers will ask themselves, what Blueberry has been up to in the intervening time". Yet, what the creators had overlooked however, was that they had made a continuity error, by placing the events in "Arizona Love" in 1889 in the opening panel, whereas Giraud clearly had meant 1873, amply demonstrated by him correcting the year in "Three Black Birds". In later reprints corrected to "late 1872", the original year mentioning had European fans initially and erroneously assuming that "Arizona Love" was the first part of the OK Corral story arc.
- ^{14} When Giraud was preparing to embark on the Mister Blueberry cycle at the start of 1995, he was fully intent on making it a new spin-off series, akin to the Young Blueberry or Marshal Blueberry series, and not as a continuation of the main series. He stated at the time, "I am preparing a Blueberry as follow-up to the Fort Navajo adventures, but which will constitute a new series: "Mister Blueberry". In effect, Blueberry is no longer in the army, he isn't even a lieutenant anymore. It is quite logical for the series to change its title..." Nonetheless, publisher Dargaud adamantly refused to go along with Giraud's intent, and published the first story as volume 24 of the main series. In hindsight however, this turned out to be unexpectedly fortuitous for Giraud, as it legally prevented Charlier heir Philippe, who became opposed to the story cycle, to exercise a publication veto.

=== Non-English translations ===
Since its inception, the series has steadily gained a large following in Europe, and has, in part or in whole, been extensively translated in both serialized and album versions into multiple languages aside from English, to wit, Spanish (both Spain proper and the Americas), Portuguese (including Brazil), Italian, German, Dutch, Swedish, Danish, Norwegian, Polish, Finnish, Serbo-Croatian, Hungarian, Greek, Icelandic, Turkish, Tamil, Indonesian and, more recently, Japanese with even more recent additions in Chinese. At least one title – "L'homme à l'étoile d'argent" – is known to have seen a relatively recent translation in Arabic in the Egyptian weekly comic magazine New Magic Carpet (بساط الريح الجديدة), issues 1–11, 2009. In Spanish and Portuguese Blueberry has seen (licensed) publications by local publishers in the Americas, as it has in the former Yugoslavia after its disintegration into its constituent parts. In the European Union, in case of trans-border language areas, it has become customary from the mid-1980s onward, to have publishing rights reside with one publisher only. Like it was in native France, most countries have seen Blueberry pre-published in magazine serials. The Portuguese 1969 "Fort Navajo" publication from Editorial Íbis is the earliest known instance of a Blueberry title to be released directly as album, without prior serialized magazine pre-publication, contrary to the 1965 French and 1968 Spanish album releases, the three of them – all executed in the hard cover format incidentally, save for the French-Belgian Le Lombard release – becoming the only available album versions of the story until 1974.

Album publication of "Fort Navajo", because Charlier had chosen to disseminate the title outside the French, Spanish and Portuguese language areas in magazine syndication, has posed problems for publishers in other language countries, especially in Germany and north-west Europe, when Blueberry broke out in popularity in the late 1960s–early 1970s, well before the syndication term was to expire in 1974. It is not known why Charlier had chosen this format for "Fort Navajo", as the US derived syndication format was by that time already well on its way out for European comics, after the relative immediate post-war paper shortage was no longer an issue. Since "Fort Navajo" was the first part of a five album story arc, this caused continuity, or rather chronology problems as publishers were not yet able to publish the album in their countries. The respective publishers all went about the conundrum in their own way; in Germany the story was first re-serialized as a magazine publication, before continuing with the album releases of the subsequent titles; in the Netherlands and Flanders it was decided to push ahead with album publication regardless of "Fort Navajo", and in the Scandinavian countries it was decided to forego on the publication of the first five titles altogether for the time being, instead opting to start album publication with volume six, "L'homme à l'étoile d'argent", leaving publication of the first five titles for a future point in time. No matter what solution was chosen, it became one of the reasons for the messed up album release chronologies for those countries (only aggravated by both the later addition of Young, and Marshal Blueberry album titles as well as the aforementioned publishing wanderings), confusing readership, especially in Germany. It was Finnish publisher Sanoma that became the first publisher able to release the first other language album edition of the title in 1974, directly after the syndication term had expired, as "Navaho: Väijytys Punaisessa laaksossa" (OCLC 57920924, notice the Finnish adherence to the originally intended series name, by now dropped by the parent publisher), that country's first Blueberry album publication, thereby avoiding the conundrum. Nor had the conundrum been an issue for the UK, as album publication only started in 1977.

There actually had been two other countries, Italy and the former Yugoslavia, where Blueberry had also enjoyed an early breakout success prior to the expiration of the syndication term, each seeing its own early release of "Fort Navajo" in its totality, to wit the respective 1967 Classici Audacia issue 42 from Arnoldo Mondadori Editore, and the 1972 Stripoteka-Panorama issue 60 from NIP Forum publications. However, both publications were legally and technically (newsstand) magazine publications and not bonafide comic albums, and resorted therefore under the magazine syndication regime.

In the United States, California based distributor Public Square Books (currently known as Zócalo Public Square) imported Blueberry albums from Spanish publisher Norma Editorial, S.A. on behalf of the Spanish speaking part of the country. Having done so in the first half of the 2000s, these albums were endowed with American ISBNs in the form of a bar code sticker, simply put over the Spanish ISBN. For example, "Arizona Love" originally carried the Spanish ISBN 8484314103, but once imported in the US, received the new, American ISBN 1594970831. Latino-Americans therefore, have been afforded the opportunity to enjoy the then entirety of the Blueberry series (including the spin-offs), contrary to their English speaking counterparts.

Apart from Europe, the Americas, Japan, Indonesia and China, the series (or parts thereof) has been translated on the Indian subcontinent in Mizo by Mahlua of Cydit Communications, operating out of Aizawl, and in Tamil. It is in the latter language in particular, spoken in the south-eastern part of India, Tamil Nadu, and on the island state of Sri Lanka, that the Blueberry saga has amassed a large fanbase and where he is dubbed "Captain Tiger" (கேப்டன் டைகர்). All three series (save Young Blueberry by Corteggiani/Blanc-Dumont – see below) have been published by Prakash Publishers under their own "Lion, Muthu Comics" imprints. In April 2015, an exclusive collectors edition was published in Tamil, collecting Blueberry titles 13 through 22 – with "Arizona Love" added in first time Tamil translation – in one 540-page album. Considered a milestone release in the entire Indian comics history, as well as one of the biggest collector editions of Blueberry comics worldwide, it had already been surpassed by the time of its release by an even more massive, entire main series – save "Apaches" – single album original language anthology of 1456 pages by parent publisher Dargaud in the previous year.

== Prequel, intermezzo, and sequel sub-series ==
A "prequel" series, La Jeunesse de Blueberry (Young Blueberry), and the "intermezzo" series Marshal Blueberry have been published as well, with other artists and writers, most famously William Vance for the latter. Despite dogged efforts on the part of Giraud, the intended Blueberry 1900 sequel did not come to fruition for extraneous reasons.

=== Prequel: La Jeunesse de Blueberry (Young Blueberry) ===
La Jeunesse de Blueberry (Young Blueberry)
- Young Blueberry as drawn by Colin Wilson

Publication information
- Publisher: Dargaud, Novedi, Alpen Publishers
- Format: Graphic novel
- Genre: Western
- Publication date: 1968-
- Main character: Mike S. Blueberry (born as Michael Steven Donovan)

Creative team
- Created by: Jean-Michel Charlier; Jean Giraud
- Written by: Jean Giraud (1968); Jean-Michel Charlier (1968-1989†); François Corteggiani (1990-2022†)
- Artist(s): Jean Giraud (1968-1979); Colin Wilson (1985-1994); Michel Blanc-Dumont (1998-)
- Colorist(s): Jean Giraud (1968-1979); Janet Gale (1985-1994); Claudine Blanc-Dumont (1998-2012†); Jocelyne Etter-Charrance (2015-)

"For purely commercial reasons, Dargaud wanted the adventures of the main heroes of the weekly (Asterix, Achille Talon, Tanguy and Laverdure, etc.) to appear as complete stories in this quarterly. Neither Jean Giraud nor I were particularly interested to have concurrent, both long and short but similarly themed stories, published in two different magazines. But abundant, enduring fan-mail from readers, who gave us their friendship by faithfully following his tumultuous adventures, told me that the Blueberry character posed many irritating enigmas for them. Why did he have a broken nose? Why did he stay in the army as he clearly did not possess the disposition, his bravery excepted, befitting a good soldier? And why this ridiculous name Blueberry? Blueberry is English for myrtille: Lieutenant Myrtille, that was not a name for a Western hero! The questions came from all sides. Unfortunately, it was impossible for me to further encumber stories that were already quite heavy. Then the idea struck me to forge out a past for Blueberry through the stories we were asked to do for this Superpocket Pilote. A past in which our readers would find answers to satisfy their legitimate curiosity. The idea excited Giraud, who decided, in order to differentiate between two series, to adopt a more lively style, more edgy, but less convoluted. Thus was born «La Jeunesse de Blueberry»".

— Charlier, on conceiving the Young Blueberry series.

A later created prequel series, dealt with Blueberry's early years, during the American Civil War, relating how the racist son of a wealthy plantation owner turned into a Yankee bugler and all the adventures after that. The material for the first three albums, conceived by the original Blueberry creators, was originally published in the 1968–1970 mass market paperback sized Super Pocket Pilote series, as in total nine 16-page short stories, eight of them constituting one story-arc set in the war. The first short story, "Tonnerre sur la sierra" ("Thunder on the Sierra"), was actually a post-war stand-alone adventure set before the events depicted in "The Lost Dutchman's Mine". With the exception of the first and the last, "Double jeu" ("Double Cross"), where the coloring was taken on by Giraud himself, all other shorts were originally published in black and white.

In 1995, Giraud slightly contradicted Charlier's birth account of La Jeunesse by divulging that he had already created the "Tonnerre sur la sierra" story by himself, before Charlier actually came up with the Civil War approach: "It was I who scripted the first episode of La Jeunesse de Blueberry. It very much resembled a regular series episode, but much smaller. Charlier subsequently presented me with another idea, the one concerning the American Civil War. I found it an excellent idea and writing started up right away".

Giraud created his La Jeunesse art with the smaller digest size format specifically in mind, and adopted therefore a more loose, less "convoluted" art style which allowed him to create his pages more quickly, already applying the revised technique for "Tonnerre sur la sierra". Additionally, it was for these stories that he started to experiment with applying inks in pen – alongside the brush he had hitherto exclusively employed for the series – a technique he would perfect later on as "Mœbius". While the resulting spontaneous art worked out fine for the smaller sized pages of Superpocket Pilote, it did suffer from the enlargement for the hereafter mentioned album releases, when compared to the larger, more detailed pages for the Pilote main series on which he concurrently continued to work. Still, the experience gained on the La Jeunesse shorts served him well, when he had to create Jim Cutlass in a hurry a decade later, utilizing a similar technique.

The publication of "La jeunesse de Blueberry" ("Blueberry's Secret") in 1975, the first album to collect the first three shorts of the Civil War story-arc, came as a surprise to Blueberry fans. Having left Blueberry on a cliffhanger with "Angel Face", when Giraud took his extended leave of absence (see above), clamor for new Blueberry titles became such, that publisher Dargaud decided to make the move as a temporary stop-gap solution. For the book publication, the original pages were blown up and by Giraud extended in width, rearranged and (re-)colored, with some panels omitted in the process to fit the then standard album format of 46 pages, when discounting the two disclaimer pages. While the removal of individual panels was regrettable from a graphic art point of view – as it, besides the missing art, also broke up the integrity of Giraud's carefully designed page lay-outs, especially in "3000 Mustangs" – it entailed no consequences for the plot of the shorts, save the first one; in "Blueberry's Secret" the synopsis mentioned Long Sam had witnessed the murder Blueberry was accused of and therefore able to prove his innocence, but is gunned down before he is able to do so by the real murderer, who in turn is gunned down by Blueberry, leaving Blueberry without any recourse to prove his innocence. However, for the book publication, the two panels which showed the real murderer being killed were cut, causing a discrepancy as it left readers, unfamiliar with the original publication, wondering why Blueberry was so despondent, as, from their point of view, the real killer was still alive.

The releases of the two follow-up collection albums, "Un Yankee nommé Blueberry" ("A Yankee Named Blueberry") and "Cavalier bleu" ("The Blue Coats"), four years later (in itself an indication that Dargaud had not planned to do so initially, if only for the substantial editorial effort it took in the pre-computer era to adapt the original digest size for the standard sized comic book), turned out to be in equal measure a stop-gap initiative. Unable to resolve the royalties conflict, which had dragged on for five years, Charlier and Giraud turned their back on the parent publisher, leaving for greener pastures elsewhere and taking all of Charlier's co-creations with them. Giraud though, conceded to do the same editorial work he did on behalf of the first album for its two follow-ups. Sensing that it might potentially turn out to be a costly defection, the two Young Blueberry titles were released to make the most of the fervor that had surrounded the return of Blueberry with "Nez Cassé". For Dargaud it indeed turned out to be a costly affair as the two 1979 titles were the last new titles they were able to release for nearly fifteen years, missing out on a period of time in which Blueberry reached the pinnacle of its popularity – seeing, besides new titles in the main series, the birth of two spin-off series as well – even though the publishing rights of the older book titles remained where they were. As the "Thunder on the Sierra" short numbered 14 pages instead of 16, no editorial cutting was necessary for the third book. Apart from the editorial changes to fit the book format and the creation of new covers for the two additional albums, Giraud also made use of the opportunity to recreate a small number of panels to replace those he had felt unhappy about in hindsight, spread over all three albums.

Dargaud considered their three, original creator's, La Jeunesse de Blueberry book titles as part of the main series, until they regained the Blueberry rights in late 1993, and as such have therefore seen translations in most of the aforementioned languages as well. Apart from the expedited release of the two additional La Jeunesse titles, Dargaud also undertook a subsequent action in an attempt to further profit from the upsurge in popularity of Blueberry, by releasing the first six-volume Blueberry integral edition of 1984. A co-production with French publisher Rombaldi, each of the six volumes collected four titles of the then existing main series. Rombaldi was brought into the fold to act as an intermediary in order to negotiate a separate license from Novedi to have the then four Novedi main series titles included as well in volumes 5 and 6, though Dargaud performed a copyright infraction by making sure Novedi was not mentioned as copyright holder in the respective colophons. The three La Jeunesse titles were collected in volume 6. In recognition for their assistance, Rombaldi was retained for similar releases of the two other Dargaud Western series, Jonathan Cartland (see also below) and Mac Coy – each, like Blueberry, one of the "big five" 1970s Franco-Belgian realistic Western comics – combining all of them in one overall, eleven-volume Les géants du l'Ouest collection, as promoted in contemporary advertisements.

The 1990 English language edition of these books by Catalan Communications in their "ComCat" line, gave track of the changes and presented the left out panels in editorials in which Giraud himself presented clarifications for the choices made. It was in effect American readership that was first afforded a clarification for the discrepancy in the first book and the editorial changes made, before European readers were, in the editorials by Lofficier of the releases. Only these first three books were published in English. The three American albums, again translated by the Lofficier couple, were also, unaltered and unedited, included in the above-mentioned anthology collection from Graphitti Designs. The Graphitti Designs "Young Blueberry" anthology title differed from the others in that it was not printed on high gloss paper, but on matte paper as in the original ComCat publications, indicating that by then inclusion in the Graphitti Moebius collection was already accounted for and that the original print run of the interior pages was adjusted accordingly.

Table of English book translations in order of the original French Young Blueberry book titles by Jean-Michel Charlier and Jean Giraud
#	French original book release (publisher, yyyy/mm, ISBN (Note: According to Bedetheque.com, the French albums of the main series were until volume 18 published in simultaneous conjuncture with Belgian publisher Le Lombard who released these for French-Belgium, initially as soft cover editions, contrary to Dargaud who released these from the start as hard cover albums. The same also held true for the first three Young Blueberry titles, then part of the main series. For expedience sake only the French editions from the parent publisher are mentioned. ISBNs were not issued until 1975, the Lombard releases actually never receiving any.))	French chapter titles (original order and magazine publication)	English saga title/French story-arc	English title and data	Note
1	La jeunesse de Blueberry (Dargaud, 1975/01, ISBN 2205007785)	2 "Le secret de Blueberry" (Super Pocket Pilote, issue 2, Dargaud, 1968/10, 16 p.); 3 "Le pont de Chattanooga" (Super Pocket Pilote, issue 3, Dargaud, 1969/04, 16 p.); 4 "3000 mustangs" (Super Pocket Pilote, issue 4, Dargaud, 1969/06, 16 p.)	Young Blueberry	Blueberry's Secret (ComCat comics, September 1989, ISBN 0874160685; Moebius #6, Graphitti Designs, 1990, ISBN 0936211229 (Note: Stand-alone "uncut" anthologies of the shorts, predominantly in black and white as use was made of the original Super Pocket Pilote source material instead of the book versions, have previously been published in Denmark, Germany and Croatia, albeit it an illegal one in the latter case. With the exception of a latter-day 2017 illegal, extremely limited, Dutch-language edition, none have seen the day of light to date in the rest of the world, including home country France.)	Three chapters in one book. Chapter titles: "Blueberry's Secret"; "The Chattanooga Bridge"; "3000 Mustangs"
1	La jeunesse de Blueberry (Dargaud, 1975/01, ISBN 2205007785)	2 "Le secret de Blueberry" (Super Pocket Pilote, issue 2, Dargaud, 1968/10, 16 p.); 3 "Le pont de Chattanooga" (Super Pocket Pilote, issue 3, Dargaud, 1969/04, 16 p.); 4 "3000 mustangs" (Super Pocket Pilote, issue 4, Dargaud, 1969/06, 16 p.)	Young Blueberry	Blueberry's Secret (ComCat comics, September 1989, ISBN 0874160685; Moebius #6, Graphitti Designs, 1990, ISBN 0936211229	"The Emerald Lake" (non-Blueberry short, 4 p.)
2	Un Yankee nommé Blueberry (Dargaud, 1979/01, ISBN 2205014854)	5 "Chevauchée vers la mort" (Super Pocket Pilote, issue 5, Dargaud, 1969/10, 16 p.); 7 "Private M.S. Blueberry" (Super Pocket Pilote, issue 7, Dargaud, 1970/03, 16 p.); 8 "Chasse à l'homme (2)" (Super Pocket Pilote, issue 8, Dargaud, 1970/06, 16 p.) (Note: In their haste to release the two follow-up titles, in the process also having to pay "renegade" Giraud for his input, the editorial office of Dargaud made a substantial editorial blunder. As stated, eight of the nine shorts constituted one long story-arc, but Dargaud placed "Chasse à l'homme" ("Manhunt", the fifth short in the story-arc) as the penultimate one in book 3, causing an awful continuity error. Readers, not familiar with the original Super Pocket Pilote publications, found themselves facing a baffling and inexplicable plot twist, only aggravated by the publisher who in unconvincing and confusing text captions tried to explain the discrepancy away, leaving uninitiated fans at the time erroneously suspecting that not all shorts were being published. In the publisher's defense however, Charlier had confusingly, but unintentionally, given two of his shorts an identical title in French and it is not that much a stretch of the imagination to assume the editors believing that the two stories belonged with each other. Fortunately for the American readership, the correct chronology, pursuant a first correction in the aforementioned Danish anthology earlier that year, was adhered to in the ComCat releases. Ironically, the French themselves, as indeed the rest of Europe, had to wait until 1995 (the Dutch actually beating the French to the punch by one year) before the publisher, pursuant regaining the Blueberry rights, could be bothered to correct the chronology for later reprint runs, after having it allowed to persevere for nearly two decades in numerous prior reprint runs for all language editions, the Danish and American editions excepted.)	Young Blueberry	A Yankee Named Blueberry (ComCat comics, March 1990, ISBN 0874160871; Moebius #6, Graphitti Designs, 1990)	Three chapters in one book. Chapter titles: "Death Ride"; "Manhunt"; "Private Mike.S.Blueberry"
2	Un Yankee nommé Blueberry (Dargaud, 1979/01, ISBN 2205014854)	5 "Chevauchée vers la mort" (Super Pocket Pilote, issue 5, Dargaud, 1969/10, 16 p.); 7 "Private M.S. Blueberry" (Super Pocket Pilote, issue 7, Dargaud, 1970/03, 16 p.); 8 "Chasse à l'homme (2)" (Super Pocket Pilote, issue 8, Dargaud, 1970/06, 16 p.)	Young Blueberry	A Yankee Named Blueberry (ComCat comics, March 1990, ISBN 0874160871; Moebius #6, Graphitti Designs, 1990)	"Nuggets and Thieves" (non-Blueberry short, 2 p.)
3	Cavalier bleu (Dargaud, 1979/10, ISBN 2205014854) (Note: Despite the creators being entitled to royalties, Dargaud's ploy to capitalize on the upsurge in popularity of Blueberry did not sit well with Charlier, who recognized it for what it was. In order to vent his displeasure, Charlier again made use of the exemption clause of his syndication agency, and established the temporary Editions Presses Internationales (EPI) imprint, under which he published a small Lieutenant Blueberry Pocket series of three outings in 1982, again using Koralle's – in whose employ he had been shortly before – infrastructure. Making sure that these three digit-sized releases were technically and legally magazine releases, akin to the Super Pocket Pilote source publications, all the shorts from Dargaud's two additional albums were reprinted in the series (OCLC 474042925). The shorts were presented uncut, with yet another new coloring, but featured Giraud's redrawn panels. Ironically though, Charlier too failed to correct the chronology. To drive home the point, the pockets also contained Charlier's two Redbeard shorts, as Dargaud had also employed a similar ploy for that series, as indeed they also had for Tanguy et Laverdure for that matter. Charlier licensed Koralle to follow suit by establishing the equally temporary Gary Publishing imprint for identical publication in Dutch. These were actually among the last known releases by Koralle, as the publisher was already in an advanced state of becoming defunct. That parent company Axel Springer even allowed the publications to go through at this late stage, should be considered another token of goodwill in recognition of Charlier's help in the smooth transition from Koralle to Novedi, as these pockets saw no release in the German home language, or in any other for that matter. Charlier concurrently farmed out a license to Danish publisher Interpresse (then the Novedi licensed Blueberry publisher) to publish the Blueberry shorts in their Jonah Hex monthly magazine. Dargaud at the time had concurrent license agreements with competitors Oberon and Serieforlaget for the respective Dutch and Danish album publications.)	Chapter titles: 6 "Chasse à l'homme" (Super Pocket Pilote, issue 6, Dargaud, 1969/12, 16 p.); 9 "Double jeu" (Super Pocket Pilote, issue 9, Dargaud, 1970/10, 16 p.) (Note: These were the only two short stories, which had been colored by Giraud for their inaugural publication in Super Pocket Pilote (constituting a nice coincidental symmetry, as they concerned the first and last short stories made by the original creators), all the others were originally in black and white. For their album publications though, Giraud had to recolor them to fit the larger page dimensions, if only because the technology to blow up the original color films did not yet exist at the time besides not having fitted the panel left/right extensions and omissions anyway.)	Young Blueberry	The Blue Coats (ComCat comics, July 1990, ISBN 0874160936; Moebius #6, Graphitti Designs, 1990)	Three chapters in one book. Chapter titles: "The Bluecoats"; "Double Cross"
3	Cavalier bleu (Dargaud, 1979/10, ISBN 2205014854)	1 "Tonnerre sur la sierra" (Super Pocket Pilote, issue 1, Dargaud, 1968/07, 14 p.)	one-shot (Lieutenant Blueberry)	The Blue Coats (ComCat comics, July 1990, ISBN 0874160936; Moebius #6, Graphitti Designs, 1990)	"Thunder on the Sierra"
3	Cavalier bleu (Dargaud, 1979/10, ISBN 2205014854)	1 "Tonnerre sur la sierra" (Super Pocket Pilote, issue 1, Dargaud, 1968/07, 14 p.)	one-shot (Lieutenant Blueberry)	The Blue Coats (ComCat comics, July 1990, ISBN 0874160936; Moebius #6, Graphitti Designs, 1990)	"Blanco, king of the Prairie" (non-Blueberry short, 4 p.)

==== Change of artist (I) ====
"Obviously, I could have never imaged that I would be drawing Blueberry one day. That is why I deliberated for so long when they asked me to do the Young-series. I mean, what I am doing is so close to Giraud, that everybody will think me a mere Giraud-imitator. Especially the first few pages. I think, as we go along, we will build something that is recognizably different from what Giraud has done up until now. Both publisher Novedi and writer Jean-Michel Charlier told me that they want me to make the series my own as soon as possible. That is why it is such a challenge. I'm looking for my own way. That will be the greatest task for the first album".

— Wilson, 1984, on taking on Young Blueberry.

"Jean Giraud has scrutinized the first trial studies of Colin Wilson: he supervised most of his drawings. This artist is quite capable of doing the series, but he is somewhat paralyzed by the fame of Blueberry and the personality of Jean Giraud. Ultimately, the most evident part of my work with him was to prevent him constantly wondering how Giraud would have drawn such and such panel in his place. La Jeunesse de Blueberry will not replace the series by Jean Giraud, who is absolutely not tired of drawing it. Quite the contrary, it is constantly on his mind! Since he has more or less identified with Blueberry, he is less and less inclined to drop the series. For example, the temples of the hero have turned white at the same time as those of the artist".

— Charlier, 1985, in France-Soir, reassuring Blueberry fans.

"Colin Wilson helped me out with "Le bout de la piste". I was extremely backlogged; he helped me with the three last pages in particular. I carefully did the penciling and some of the faces (that of General Golden Mane for example) and all the Blueberrys in detail, and Colin did the rest. But this was a special case, a kind of favor from a friend. I like Colin and his wife Janet very much. That I reverted the task to him, was not laziness on my part, but rather a gesture of friendship; I wanted to demonstrate to him that he could draw Blueberry every-bit as good as I did".

"It is a good series, keeping Blueberry alive, but I'm otherwise not involved in the least. If Colin wants, I can assume the role of a mentor. I told Colin he should in no way feel tied down, he should take all the freedom he needs; it is his series now. We have never cooperated [on Young Blueberry], but when I introduced Colin to Charlier, it was already clear to me that he was good. He was as impressed with Blueberry as I was with Jerry Spring, back in the day. He did not create Westerns then, but SF, yet you could already see his potential".

— Giraud, 1988, on getting his protégé on his way as an established Blueberry artist.

After "Angel Face" was completed in 1974, Giraud took an extended leave of absence from Blueberry, because he wanted further explore and develop his "Moebius" alter ego, the work he produced as such being published in Métal Hurlant magazine, in the process revolutionizing the Franco-Belgian world of bandes dessinées. Having ended "Angel Face" on a cliffhanger, Giraud's return to Blueberry five years later with "Broken Nose" became a media event of considerable proportions and demand for Blueberry reached an all-time high. It was then that the creators decided to revisit the Young Blueberry adventures as well, which had ended its run in Super Pocket Pilote. Giraud was nowhere near able to take on yet another major series himself, as he was still working on his Incal series as Moebius, besides having embarked on Blueberry again.

There actually had been an additional, more prosaic reason as well for the decision to do so. After Giraud had finished "La dernière carte" he, having been very much invested throughout most of his adult life in New Age beliefs and practices (which included the use of mind-expanding substances), had already left for Tahiti to join the commune of mystic Jean-Paul Appel-Guéry, the latter had set up there. After a stay of nearly two years, Giraud moved to the United States in late 1984 and set up shop firstly in Santa Monica, and subsequently in Venice and Woodland Hills, California. It was in this era that his work was published by Marvel/Epic for the US market. Publisher Novedi feared, not entirely unjustified – as the release lag between two titles had already increased from eighteen months to three years – that it endangered the publication regularity of the main series, and resurrecting, or more accurately, creating the Young Blueberry series, was the back-up strategy they had in mind. Novedi had solid reasons to do so, as any new Blueberry title in that particular period of time enjoyed an (all-language) European first print run of 500.000 copies – thus discounting any later reprint run – for European standards a very respectable print run.

Publisher and creators subsequently embarked on a search for a suitable artist to take on the task. It was then that fate intervened when Giraud, before his departure to Tahiti, discovered the work of the still unknown ex-pat Colin Wilson from New Zealand, who was publishing a science fiction comic series Dans l'Ombre du Soleil – for which Wilson did both the writing and the art – for the French Circus comic magazine, which featured the character "Raël" (also the first story title) that shared a stunning resemblance with Blueberry. Wilson was actually a huge Giraud fan himself and had modeled his "Raël" character after a Western hero he had created for the New Zealand fanzine Strips, and who in turn was modeled after Blueberry. Ironically in hindsight, it were the original black & white La Jeunesse de Blueberry shorts that introduced Wilson to Blueberry as some Super Pilote Pocket issues had somehow found their to way to New Zealand, then a country without a comic tradition to speak of, according to Wilson. His admiration for Franco-Belgian bande dessinée artists, Giraud in particular, became in 1980 the driving force for Wilson to try his luck as such in Europe, aside from the fact that his native country did not afford any opportunities to become one professionally. Wilson reiterated in 1986: "Those drawings of Giraud convinced me to leave New Zealand. If that's what European comics are like then I wanted to be a part of it". It was comic artist François Corteggiani who brought Wilson to the attention of Giraud by sending him a few pages of the "Raël" comic, and who in turn brought them to the attention of his co-worker Charlier (or vice versa as sources are not in concordance with each other).

Unaware that his work was already brought to the attention of his idol and his co-worker, Corteggiani arranged Wilson's first face-to-face meeting with them in September 1983 in Paris. Wilson said: "To have a discussion with Giraud, what a chance! That's why I immediately said yes to François Corteggiani". Much to his own surprise, Wilson was almost immediately asked if he was interested to take on the new Young Blueberry series. After having accepted, he developed a close and warm working relationship with Charlier, and the Wilson/Gale couple befriended both him and his wife Christine, with household visits back and forth. The Charlier couple not only helped their friends (neither of them French-speaking and staying on a tourist visa in Amsterdam at the time) to settle firstly in Brussels, Belgium, and subsequently in the Provence, France, but with practical work details as well, as Wilson later recalled: "Janet and I were tremendously lucky, Charlier was in many respects something of a kind uncle to us. He did not make a fuss about anything. He really stuck out his neck for me by involving me, a virtually unknown young artist, in a success series. I know he could be tough as nails with publishers. We were fortunate though, that he negotiated on our behalf as well, and we profited very much from the deals he struck". Wilson was signed for five albums. Corteggiani himself was yet to leave his mark on the La Jeunesse de Blueberry series later on. Wilson became the second, and last Charlier artist, after Giraud, whom the author provided with script pages in a timely fashion, once even receiving a page overnighted from Kuwait where the author then was on documentary assignment, just to keep his artist working.

After a short apprenticeship (during which he produced Blueberry study art) to fine tune his art style, already close to that of Giraud, in order to have it move even closer to that of Giraud, Wilson embarked with fervor on the project with his first outing "Les démons du Missouri" ("Missouri Demons"), which essentially became the rationale for the Young Blueberry adventures to become a spin-off series onto their own. Working seven days a week for ten to twelve hours, Wilson produced five to six pages a month, using a combination of pen and brush for the inks, just as his idol had done for his Jeunesse stories and which had become the inspiration for Wilson to abandon the Rotring technical utensils he had originally used in New-Zealand.

As it had in 1980 when Giraud was working on "La longue marche" with an assistant (see below), rumors quickly abounded in the tight-knit bande dessinée community that Giraud intended to abandon Blueberry. This time around however, and unlike 1980, the rumors found their way to the outside world, causing anxiety in the fan community. Despite the publisher's standing policy of releasing comics directly in album format, it was decided to have "Les démons du Missouri" pre-published in the newspaper France-Soir, one of the largest newspapers in France at the time, in an effort to counteract the growing disquiet. A first for Blueberry insofar daily newspapers were concerned, black & white publication began at the start of 1985, with Wilson feeding the newspaper with half-pages as he went along. The first half-page was accompanied by an editorial from Charlier, in which he tried to allay the fears of the fans (see quotebox). The format was for good measure repeated in 1987 with Wilson's second outing, "Terreur sur le Kansas" ("Terror over Kansas"), for the same newspaper, but abandoned afterwards when Wilson had become an established Blueberry artist himself. France-Soir saw two half-pages (1b and 2a) from "Terreur sur le Kansas" published that were not incorporated in the album, released later that year, for print technical reasons (see also The Blueberry biography in this regard).

Despite the initial trepidations of fans, Wilson's Blueberrys were favorably received, achieving print run numbers approximating those of the main series, as well as seeing translations in nearly as many languages, with English being the glaring one of the few exceptions as of 2017. Wilson has divulged that Novedi released the first album in a first French printing of 150.000 copies (Novedi had by then taken over the publication for France as well) and a Dutch first printing of 50.000 copies, a huge step up from the initial French only 12.000 copy release for the "Raël" album. The French edition sold out in a matter of weeks, and an additional 20.000 copies followed suit in a hurry. Compared to the main series, the first printing was conservative for the French edition and ample for the Dutch edition. It even had a positive side-effect on his science fiction series Dans l'Ombre du Soleil, which saw a Dutch and German series translation after he had embarked on Blueberry, with a Danish and English translation of "Raël" only to boot. Wilson though, had to abandon this series in 1989, having added two more titles, because Blueberry demanded all his attention and energy, aside from the fact that it was the more successful one by far, allowing the couple to move to the Provence. It were not only the fans who were relieved, Wilson too had his trepidations alleviated when he met the fans face-to-face for the first time at several comic convention book signings after the release of the first album, grateful for their gracious reception and acceptance of his Blueberry, even though most of them concurrently and emphatically expressed their relieve that Giraud would continue to be the artist for the main series.

While Wilson was working on "Terreur sur le Kansas", he was asked by Giraud, who had shortly returned to Europe, to finish up on "Le bout de la piste" as well, as he was pressed for time, preparing to leave for California where he just had set up shop. Wilson did part of the inking of "Le bout de la piste", while his girlfriend Janet Gale, who had followed him from New Zealand, took on the coloring. Giraud himself assigned her the task, being impressed by the work she had done on her fiancé's album. Gale was actually a relative novice, as she only started coloring on her fiancé's Dans l'Ombre du Soleil series, having been unable to find legitimate employment in Europe due to her visa status. She would continue to color all her future husband's Blueberry books, as well as several albums from other artists released by Novedi. Giraud himself was from the moment Wilson took over the series no longer involved creatively, aside from occasionally giving his young colleague some advice, but did receive a "small inventor's fee" per title, as he himself had coined it.

While several European countries (including outliers like Iceland and Turkey) had, no post-original creators title – discounting the newspaper serialization of the first two Wilson titles – has seen serialized comic magazine pre-publication in France/French-Belgium itself, where the titles were instead directly released as books. By the time the 1990 "Le raid infernal" was released, virtually every other country had followed suit due to the demise of the serialized magazine format.

Like parent publisher Dargaud, publisher Novedi considered the Young Blueberry books part of the main series at first until 1990, before they were instituted as a separate spin-off series, mostly for the practical reason of wanting to avoid further pollution of release numbering and chronology. Dargaud's stance was adhered to in other European countries, among others in Spain where then regular Blueberry publisher Grijalbo/Ediciones Junior released their 1988-1996 Las aventuras del teniente Blueberry eight-volume integral collection, encompassing all hitherto released Blueberry albums, including those of Wilson. Like Dargaud had to do for their previous Les géants du l'ouest collection, the Spanish had to separately negotiate licenses from Koralle and Novedi for their Blueberry releases, but unlike the Dargaud release, these publishers were dutifully mentioned as copyright holders in the colophons of the respective volumes. Wilson's "Terreur sur le Kansas" became the first album to be released as a separate La Jeunesse series title in 1987, as indicated on its back cover. It was therefore not Dargaud who took the initiative for the move, but rather Novedi, due to the fact that Dargaud had lost the publishing rights for new Blueberry titles, actually missing out on the first five, most successful, titles of the new series as explained. But Dargaud did adopt the format, once these rights had returned to them in late 1993.

Catalan Communications had planned to publish "Missouri Demons", "Terror over Kansas", and beyond in English as well, as additions to their Young Blueberry series in the "ComCat" line from 1991 onward (alongside Hermann's Comanche Western incidentally, another favorite of Wilson), which was already indicated on the back covers of the three original ones published in 1989–1990. The former had in effect already received an ISBN. Publication came to naught, due to the near-concurrent, but otherwise coincidental, demises of both Novedi and Catalan Communications in early-1990 and mid-1991 respectively.

Jean-Michel Charlier and Colin Wilson

- 4: Les démons du Missouri (Novedi, 1985/09, ISBN 2803900262)—Missouri Demons (ComCat comics, January 1991, ISBN 0874161096; canceled)^{5}
- 5: Terreur sur le Kansas (Novedi, 1987/10, ISBN 2803900467)—Terror Over Kansas (ComCat comics, 1991, canceled)
- 6: Le raid infernal (Novedi, 1990/03, ISBN 2803900645)

==== Change of writer ====
While Charlier's death in July 1989 did not cause succession problems for the main series as explained, it did not held true for the Jeunesse series as both Charlier's heir, Philippe Charlier, and the publisher considered Wilson too much of an inexperienced novice to take on the writing of a major series himself, or as he himself had later put it: "I doubt if "Raël" or "Mantell" accounted for anything at Dargaud [sic, Wilson meant Novedi] in this regard". However, the search for a replacement for Charlier, turned out to be a rather tall order, as none of the established names in the Franco-Belgian comic world were found willing to fill the shoes of the legendary Charlier, whereas non-established names were rejected for pretty much the same reasons why Wilson was not considered as replacement. It was then, in order to break the gridlock, that Wilson suggested François Corteggiani as replacement, deeming it "logical", as he assumed Corteggiani to be an admirer of Charlier. Corteggiani had been one of the lesser names in the Franco-Belgian comic world, having predominantly written a couple of short-lived humorous comic series and one realistic series, the heavily Godfather Trilogy inspired mafia saga De silence et de sang – which he had abandoned in 1986 after only two volumes, only to take it on again ten years later, piggybacking on his newfound notoriety as Blueberry writer. Both critical and commercial success have always eluded Corteggiani, and by the time he was approached by Novedi and Philippe Charlier, he had suspended his own career as a bande dessinée artist, instead becoming a tenured script writer for the French Disney studios. To his credit, Corteggiani refused at first, for the same reason his more established colleagues had already done previously, but eventually conceded on the insistence of Wilson. Wilson had personal reasons to do so, as Corteggiani was a personal friend of the Wilson-couple, aside for the practical reason that he was living in the vicinity of the Wilson-couple at the time. When the non-French speaking Wilson couple first arrived in Europe, they met Corteggiani at the annual Italian Lucca Comics & Games festival. Corteggiani took a shining on the newcomers and took them under his wing. It was Corteggiani, using his vast Franco-Belgian comic world social network, who introduced Wilson to publisher Glénat, resulting in his first European comic series Dans l'Ombre du Soleil, in the process negotiating on behalf of his friend. As already related, it was Corteggiani who, while keeping tabs on the work of his friend, introduced Wilson's work to the Blueberry creators. Wilson reasoned that by suggesting Corteggiani for a major series, he could return the favor he had provided him a few years earlier, by getting his friend's bande dessinée career back on track. Actually, he and Wilson had already started their own Thunderhawks comic series before Charlier died, an aviation comic set shortly after the first world war in the American South-West, but which had to take a backseat due to the fact that the Blueberry series took precedence.

Corteggiani's first order of business was to finish up on the script for "Le raid infernal" which was halfway completed by Charlier at the time of his death. This he did to the satisfaction of all parties involved, including Wilson, and Corteggiani was retained as the Jeunesse writer ever since.

The publication of Wilson's fourth album "La poursuite impitoyable" in 1992 was surprisingly still under the Novedi imprint, over a year after the publishing house had ceased to exist. This can only be explained by the fact that Wilson was originally signed for five albums by Novedi, and that the official receivers of the defunct publisher wanted the revenues for the legal and financial finalization of the bankruptcy. The album therefore became a posthumous Novedi release. All legal issues were apparently resolved by the time of the publication of the fifth Wilson album, "Trois hommes pour Atlanta" one year later, as it was released by Novedi's successor Alpen Publishers, becoming the only Jeunesse title they were able to release, before they themselves lost publication rights to Dargaud in late 1993.

François Corteggiani and Colin Wilson

- 7: La poursuite impitoyable (Novedi, 1992/01, ISBN 2803900734)
- 8: Trois hommes pour Atlanta (Alpen Publishers, 1993/06, OCLC 413528824, no first printing ISBN issued)
- 9: Le prix du sang (Dargaud, 1994/10, ISBN 2205042823)

==== Emmet Walsh and the departure of Colin Wilson ====
"What started to irk me a lot was the cartoonish writing style - the brawls, the sleazebag comedians, the clichés, the never-ending out-of-the-blue coincidences, these unbelievable, unrealistic situations that were weaved more and more into the scenarios".

— Wilson, 2000, expressing his growing displeasure over the Corteggiani scenarios.

Wilson came to regret his loyalty to his friend Corteggiani; while pleased with the scenarios for Le raid infernal and La poursuite impitoyable, he became considerably less pleased with those following these two outings. The artist complained in a 2000 interview (quote box to the right) that Corteggiani's scenarios became increasingly juvenile and decreasingly serious. Wilson reacted by the rapidly declining quality of the scenarios by letting the quality of his artwork, which had been of such a high Giraud-like quality, slide for the two last albums he was yet to pencil by largely reverting to the less detailed loose art style he usually had been (and would be) employing for the American-Anglo comic industry. Even Giraud started to harbor doubts in the same series of interviews albeit in a far more veiled fashion, when he stated that he was " (...)not here to discuss Corteggiani's work" when asked about him, though he was a little more outspoken five years later as evidenced in the quote box below.

After the 1994 album Le prix du sang, Wilson had had enough and decided to create a more mature Young Blueberry story by himself. Taking his cue from Charlier's Blueberry biography where a single mention was made of Blueberry's post-traumatic stress disorder (PTSD), he was suffering from when he returned home after the war, Wilson decided to tell a mature, psychological story of how Blueberry contracted the condition during the war. Coined "Emmet Walsh", the story revolves around the so-named naive southern youth who dreams of heroism and glory and leaves his mother's homestead to join the Confederate forces. It was only five to six pages into the story that young Walsh meets up with Blueberry who takes him under his wing. During their time together both men are confronted with the true horrors of war and young Walsh meets a gruesome end ultimately, leaving a distraught Blueberry well on his way to his PTSD. Wilson, knowing full well that he still lacked the experience to write a scenario for a prime series like Young Blueberry, sought out the advice of both the senior editors at Dargaud and his former mentor Giraud who by then had acquired the experience to write for a prime BD series. Wilson had a tough time convincing the Dargaud editors that knew what he was doing and what he was trying to achieve with his story. Dargaud though requested that Wilson adapted his story so that Blueberry already made an appearance from page one onward. Not wanting to spoil his chances to see his story published, Wilson gave in to their demands and even penciled the first four pages showing the by Dargaud requested adaptations. He refused to budge to Giraud's suggestions though, as they were so many and so drastic that the entire Emmet Walsh storyline vanished almost entirely into the background. Giraud however, had not the intention to belittle his younger colleague, but rather wanted to safeguard him from the confrontation he knew Wilson was headed straight into with both Dargaud and Philippe Charlier in particular. Dargaud had just reacquired the Blueberry copyrights after the very costly defection of the Giraud/Charlier creator team back in 1979, and Giraud was acutely aware – unlike Wilson as the defection had taken place long before his Blueberry engagement – how sensitive the matter of rebellious BD artists was to the publisher. Even more pertinent was that Giraud knew that Philippe Charlier would never go along with the more mature, psychological story Wilson had written, as he as the guardian of his late father's artistic legacy, was of the firm conviction that any addition to his father's body of work should be fast-paced, light, commercially attractive, shallow adventure stories intended for a (male) adolescent readership only, completely unencumbered by mature themes (especially when it concerned something heavy-handed like PTSD), just as Charlier, Jr. believed his father had always intended.

The inevitable took place shortly thereafter when Corteggiani and Charlier Jr. were informed of Wilson's script by Dargaud. As Giraud had already suspected, Charlier Jr. was vehemently opposed and the reaction of Corteggiani was no less vicious. Considering the script a backstabbing betrayal from someone he had considered a friend, Corteggiani's friendship with the Wilson couple was terminated right there and then. Wilson on his part immediately terminated his participation on the second outing of the duo's Thunderhawks aviation series, work on which had just started up by Wilson. Now Wilson found himself faced with the dark side of the tight-knit Franco-Belgian bande dessinée community, the backstabbing backroom politics, discovering to his detriment that Charlier Jr. was very much unlike his father and most definitely not his friend – something that his former mentor Giraud had already discovered for himself in his very own specific case. Both Corteggiani and Charlier Jr. immediately set to work in order to have Wilson – who still was a non-French speaker and therefore completely defenseless against the backroom machinations – entirely removed from the Franco-Belgian bande dessinée scene. Corteggiani in particular set to work with a vengeance as he not only used his Franco-Belgian BD social network (he had previously used to get Wilson his start in the industry) to make absolutely sure that Wilson would never again work in the Franco-Belgian BD industry, but also by already starting his search for a replacement while Wilson was still employed by Dargaud. The latter was only too happy to give in, and in 1996 Wilson was aggressively manipulated into departing on his own accord. As fully intended by Corteggiani, neither Wilson nor his fiancée (who freelanced as colorist for other Dargaud artists as well besides her fiancé, but who was also targeted by Corteggiani's wrath) were able to find work anywhere else in the industry afterwards, and were forced to leave the EU after Wilson's work permit had expired the following year. The Wilson couple did not return home to New Zealand however, but to Australia as that country did have a comics scene, contrary to their native country, albeit a small one, and it was from there that they were able to slowly rebuild his comics career.

Wilson himself was in the years directly thereafter reluctant to delve too much into the details surrounding his departure, only speaking about it in more generic terms, such as, "(...)it is an immensely popular series, and as one of its creators is no longer among us, it has now become the purview of many other people who have a say in it. So it has become inevitable that series changes. I've played my part...and now it is in the hands of others. I think the readership should make up its mind for themselves", and "I think that nowadays the whole problem with the Blueberry realm is lying in the circumstance that several key persons are making rather dumb decisions. I at least do not wish to be part of it anymore..." On one rare occasion in 2006 though, he did allow his true feelings and frustrations to show through when he stated, "Philippe Charlier was dead-set on making his mark on all series, editors came and went, it became too complicated. I started to pencil comics, because I was a fan, and only wanted to continue doing that, to tell stories without any kind of business hassles." Former mentor Giraud actually came to substantiate Wilson's latter statement in 2015.

Dargaud has never issued any kind of official proclamation on Wilson's departure, and when the next Young Blueberry installment was released in 1998 that was not penciled by Wilson, it came as an utter and complete surprise to the Blueberry fanbase and the rest of the outside world. What statements about Wilson's departure there were made thereafter, Dargaud had left entirely to the artists involved who were inclined to do so. Giraud had seemed to err on the side of caution by apparently siding with the new creator team, when he stated in 2005, "When Charlier died, we couldn't continue. He [Wilson] lacked the sharpness and speed to continue alone. He was gradually taken out of the loop by the publisher and the rights holders. I tried to help him, but in vain." The remarkable thing about Giraud's short statement is that it is riddled with half-truths: the later lack of sharpness and his attempts to help him are confirmed, the supposed soft-handed handling of Wilson's departure as well as his supposed lack of production speed are outright lies, besides the false impression he invoked by implying that he and Wilson formed a creative team on the series – as already stated, Giraud had no creative input whatsoever after the original stories he and Charlier had created in the 1960s. A comparison of the publication dates of Wilson's body of work above and those of his replacement below, learns that Wilson produced right on schedule, neither slower nor faster. Stronger still, it was his replacement who started to lag considerably from 2010 onward, not to mention Giraud with both his Marshal Blueberry series as well as his "Mister Blueberry" cycle, a circumstance that had not been lost on Wilson himself. The duplicitous Corteggiani himself spin-doctored Wilson's departure as the artist suffering from a severe bout of homesickness and was dying to return home, a lie he already told Wilson's successor in 1996, and one he would repeat at the very few comics conventions he attended directly after the release of the first non-Wilson Young Blueberry album.

In May 2020, Wilson divulged for the very first time, that he too had a signed "longest-living clause" contract with Jean-Michel Charlier. Wilson recounted with a certain sardonic measure of glee, how the discovery of his late father's copy of the contract among his papers left Philippe Charlier frothing at the mouth from anger. It went a long way explaining why Charlier Jr. was so fanatically determined to get rid of Wilson (a voluntary departure of Wilson would leave Charlier Jr. legally free to do whatever he pleased with the Young Blueberry series, such as attracting any new artist entirely subject to his bidding and with only the absolute bare minimum of legal entitlement – as eventually realized), but the latter also reiterated that he did not possess the stomach to engage in a long, drawn-out and undoubtedly bitter legal conflict, which explained his willingness to leave on his own accord, as already stated in earlier, above referenced interviews. Incidentally, Giraud and Wilson were the only two artists known with whom Jean-Michel Charlier had ever entered into such a legally binding arrangement, again underlining the special place the Blueberry series held in Charlier's body of work.

==== Second change of artist ====
"He is an artist whose body of work I love for its lyric qualities. There is in his BDs a real attention to detail and investment rarely equaled. Jonathan Cartland is a very ambitious graphic work, but Colby with Greg, is somewhat below his potential. On Blueberry, I find him a little less invested, but it must be said that it is not really his series and the scripts don't possess the extraordinary quality of those of Harlé on Cartland. Even I find weaknesses in the scripts of François Corteggiani, but is not my place to stick my nose in his work. And of the script writers under consideration at the time for Young Blueberry, François was the better one".

— Giraud, 2005, opining on the quality of La Jeunesse de Blueberry by Blanc-Dumont and Corteggiani.

The artist Corteggiani approached in 1996 turned out to be Michel Blanc-Dumont, the artist of one of the "Big Five" Franco-Belgian western BDs in the 1970s, the critically acclaimed Jonathan Cartland series. It was almost certain that Blanc-Dumont had been the only artist Corteggiani sought out as the latter was well aware of the fact that he was a favorite of both Giraud as well as of the late Charlier Sr., who had once stated, "Had I not coincidentally met Jean Giraud, I would have preferably started the long Blueberry saga with Michel Blanc-Dumont." To his credit, Blanc-Dumont had no idea what was going on with the Young Blueberry series and could only rely on what Corteggiani cared to tell him, which was in a non-committal way informing him that there were "some differences of opinion" with Wilson and if Blanc-Dumont was interested to do Blueberry or "something else" with him. As Blanc-Dumont recalled, "He therefore made me a [generic] proposal, like all good scenario writers do." On that occasion Blanc-Dumont had to decline though, as he had to finish up on his aviation BD Colby he had created with Greg and the replacement BD for Cartland (in which he had been very much invested), he, to his immense regret, had to stop due to the illness and ultimate death in 2005 of his scenario writer Laurence Harlé, with whom he had a very close and warm working relationship.

A few months later, in January 1997, Blanc-Dumont was again approached by both Philippe Charlier and Jean Giraud during breakfast in a hotel during the Angoulême International Comics Festival, and this time he was asked straight up front if he wanted to take over the Young Blueberry series. Wilson had by then already left, so there was no danger of any potential guilt feelings on the part of Blanc-Dumont. "This series had already been taken over by Colin Wilson, who had delivered very good series outings, the scenarios having been taken over by François Corteggiani. I think it was François who first told me that Wilson wanted to quit to return to his country, New Zealand (Blanc-Dumont has never been set straight on what had really transpired, as he as late as 2025 still adhered to this version of events). And in Angoulême, Philippe Charlier and especially Jean Giraud went further by really asking me to resume the series. Giraud was so happy that I accepted that, when we took the train together to return to Paris, he had to tell me three stories of Blueberry during the trip, he was so overflowing with ideas. This was a great moment for me as well. And I took over La Jeunesse de Blueberry without stress, because I had nothing left to prove," Blanc-Dumont recalled. As it turned out, this was one of the very rare occasions, arguably the only one, that Giraud and Charlier Jr. were of the same mind. As indicated in the quote box above, Giraud was a great admirer of Blanc-Dumont's Cartland art, and had actually already asked him a few years earlier to provide the art for the Blueberry 20 ans après ("Blueberry, 20 years later", the later coined Blueberry 1900 sequel) project he had in mind, a project Blanc-Dumont declined as he was finishing up on the last Cartland outing, and because he deemed Giraud's synopsis too Mœbiusienne for his tastes. Blanc-Dumont had one condition however, "I wished to create a Blanc-Dumont BD, come what may; a Blueberry that is clearly mine, despite the characteristics he had been given by those who had drawn him before, especially those he received from Jean and Charlier. It really had to become my Young Blueberry." Giraud's glee over the appointment of Blanc-Dumont as the new Young Blueberry artist, also served as a rationale for his lackluster support of his erstwhile protégé Colin Wilson.

After the (by Philippe Charlier desired variant) contracts were signed on 8 April 1997, Blanc-Dumont committed himself to deliver four pages a month, stating, "If you have reached page 23, it becomes easier. After that you work in a far more relaxed manner." The first Blanc-Dumont Young Blueberry album, "La solution Pinkerton" was released in November 1998, four years after the publication of the last Wilson album, without any serialized magazine pre-publication. Blanc-Dumont's wife, Claudine, who had since their betrothal been the colorist on all her husband's work (including Cartland and Colby), was retained as such for his new commission. Claudine incidentally, had already been given the assignment by Dargaud to replace Claude Poppé's original coloring of the first four Blueberry albums for their 1993/94 reprint run and beyond – though the original coloring was restored for the 2012 commemorative omnibus collection.

As touched upon above, the fanbase and outside world were entirely unaware that an artist change had even been in the making, due to Dargaud's complete information black-out, and therefore completely taken aback after the four-year series suspension by the unexpected publication of the first Blanc-Dumont album. While the first Blanc-Dumont outing did reasonably well, because it was a Blueberry installment after all, fans were not quite sure of what to make of it for two reason; firstly the scenario quality that kept declining, and secondly, Blanc-Dumont's artwork itself. Fans could not get used (nor would they ever be, as it turned out) to the somewhat static, almost wooden art style, which worked perfectly for his baroque, psychological and subdued Cartland BD, but considerably less so for a dynamic, action driven BD like Blueberry – nor had it ever done so for his own Colby action BD for that matter, and which was therefore canceled by Dargaud after only three series outings as a commercial failure, though it did leave an entirely unencumbered Blanc-Dumont completely free to accept the Young Blueberry commission. Foreboding signs on the wall though, became already apparent a couple of years later, painfully so, when Dargaud found itself confronted with ever declining printing numbers for subsequent volumes, as specified hereafter, and the fact that from the very start far fewer foreign publishers were found willing to pick up the Blanc-Dumont version of the series for their territories.

Despite his lack of public support for his erstwhile protégé Wilson, Giraud actually turned out to be in agreement with the latter's critical assessment of Corteggiani's scenarios. Sensing the disquiet among Blueberry fans, but also driven by his desire to get his idol Blanc-Dumont as good a start as humanly possible, Giraud had already in 1997 expressed his interest to take on a more active role in the scenario writing by stating that young Blueberry "would continue to traverse through the war on his merry way, but by taking the realities and the sufferings that war entailed a little bit more seriously." Additionally, he came up with an idea to mitigate the negative effects Corteggiani's increasingly juvenile scenarios had on the Blueberry-brand by having Blueberry integrated in a more mature manner into the Jim Cutlass series (created in 1979 by the original Blueberry creators and started up again by Giraud in 1991). "After the Civil War," Giraud clarified in 1997, "we find Blueberry back in a deplorable state; he's wounded, has lost his memory, and it is Cutlass who will help him to regain it. But that's not a blessing at all, because the reason he has amnesia is that he was responsible for a mistake that cost the lives of many people. The story is so crazy that the reporter it is related to, foregoes on publishing it out of fear that no one will believe him." Philippe Charlier however, immediately exercised his veto right to torpedo both Giraud suggestions, rather unsurprisingly actually, as they were in effect indirect, veiled endorsements of the ideas Wilson had put forward in his rejected Emmet Walsh scenario. Charlier Jr.'s obstinacy irked Giraud to no end, and he stated in a later interview, "If I were doing it, I'd give it more energy, give it some structure: develop an arc, and end it. And have a very dramatic climax that shows why, after the Civil War, Blueberry heads out west again, broken down, limping, why he's so unhappy...Someday, I'll have to reveal that secret!" Giraud actually acted upon this impulse to an extent, by incorporating flashback scenes in the "OK Corral" cycle (later collected in the 2007 stand-alone album "Apaches"), where a bed-ridden Blueberry tells a reporter the story of how he arrived at his first Far West posting directly after the war, completely ravaged by PTSD.

Shortly before his death in March 2012, after having pussyfooted around the subject matter for years, the gloves came finally off when Giraud came with both barrels after the two men he held personally responsible for the devaluation of the Blueberry-brand in the below referenced 2015 Sadoul biography. He blasted Phillipe Charlier in particular for dumbing down the Young Blueberry series by his incessant insistence on commercial infantile shallowness, thereby becoming the prime responsible agent for turning Young Blueberry into a "ridiculous" series, conceding that he "was shocked, even, by how lightly he [Corteggiani] took certain scenes", which he considered an affront to the American Civil War itself and its victims, having in his eyes been reduced to a disrespectful joke and banality. The second sin, equally heinous as far as he was concerned, Giraud had squarely laid at the feet of both Charlier Jr. and Corteggiani was the fact that he was deeply pained to see a BD artist of Blanc-Dumont's stature being "forced to pick up a spinoff", after coming from his own major series [Cartland] and being reduced to take on "a sequel to something that wasn't even his own!", which was in effect very similar to the fate that had befallen Giraud's old mentor Jijé in the end at the hand of Charlier Sr.

Giraud's Young Blueberry author rights incidentally, extended beyond merely collecting the aforementioned "small inventor's fee", as it turned out that he too was entitled to exercise veto rights. Giraud however, had never chosen to exercise these rights, despite his displeasure over the quality of the Young Blueberry series. His reasons for this was that he did not want to be the one, responsible for "artists and scenario writers" becoming unable "to feed themselves" – meaning Blanc-Dumont in particular unsurprisingly, but surprisingly the in Giraud's view deeply flawed Corteggiani as well – , adding sardonically that Philippe Charlier had no such qualms whatsoever and that the latter "disgusted" him by his ruthless haste to "coolly" rake in the royalties as quickly as he was able to without exhibiting any other consideration beyond that.

François Corteggiani and Michel Blanc-Dumont

note: the last figures specified between the parentheses denote the first Francophone print-run of each individual volume, where known.

- 10: La solution Pinkerton (Dargaud, 1998/11, ISBN 2205045180)
- 11: La piste des maudits (Dargaud, 2000/01, ISBN 2205048511)
- 12: Dernier train pour Washington (Dargaud, 2001/11, ISBN 2205051741, 100,000)
- 13: Il faut tuer Lincoln (Dargaud, 2003/05, ISBN 2205052012, 100,000)
- 14: Le boucher de Cincinnati (Dargaud, 2005/09, ISBN 2205053744, 90,000)
- 15: La sirene de Vera-Cruz (Dargaud, 2006/10 ISBN 2205055267, 80,000)
- 16: 100 dollars pour mourir (Dargaud, 2007/09, ISBN 9782205056594, 60,000)
- 17: Le Sentier des larmes (Dargaud, 2008/11, ISBN 9782205058444, 66,000)
- 18: 1276 âmes (Dargaud, 2009/09, ISBN 9782205061444, 55,000)
- 19: Redemption (Dargaud, 2010/09, ISBN 9782205063226, 55,000)
- 20: Gettysburg (Dargaud, 2012/05, ISBN 9782205066548, 45,000)
- 21: Le convoi des bannis (Dargaud, 2015/12, ISBN 9782205067781, 40,000)

As already observed by Wilson, the quality of Corteggiani's scenarios kept falling steadily over the years to the point that Swiss BD reporter Erik Svane felt already in 2003 compelled during an interview with the disgraced artist to let slip that "Corteggiani's scenarios can not hold a candle to those of Charlier", in essence giving voice to what the vast majority of the Blueberry fanbase was already starting to feel by then. A salient detail was, that François Corteggiani had all but disappeared from the public eye by that time; had he still made some rare BD festival appearances at the debut of La solution Pinkerton in 1998–1999, no public appearances and less than half a dozen of very short publicized non-Blueberry related interviews were known since then. By February 2015, criticism of his Blueberry writings had apparently reached to the point at which Corteggiani even felt compelled to take his personal web-blog offline. Tellingly, Corteggiani had never discussed Young Blueberry even once on his mere five-year old blog. His complete absence from the 2003 German Zack-Dossier 1: Blueberry und der europäische Western-Comic reference book (where the long dead Jean-Michel Charlier was extensively covered by archival interviews), was equally telling and conspicuous in this respect.

"François was a writer of serial stories—he wrote multi-volume sagas—and I admit I was starting to feel a bit weary of that. I told him I didn't feel up to embarking on another long-term project. So, he scaled things back, and we arrived at a first book that I fully completed—beautifully colored by Joyce Charrance, incidentally. But I wanted to move on to something else and told François as much. He began looking for another artist. Things stalled there for a while, and then he passed away very suddenly, leaving no instructions for what should happen next. The release of the album I had drawn was jeopardized because it made no sense to publish it on its own. We also needed to get input from the various heirs. All of this took a tremendous amount of time. Eventually, a solution was found: adding about fifteen pages to properly wrap up the story. Marc Bourgne took on the task and wrote a solid ending. The album will finally be released next year."

— Blanc-Dumont, 2025, on why the La Jeunesse de Blueberry series had stalled so badly.

In the same year Giraud died, Blanc-Dumont's wife and life-long colorist Claudine also died. Being also confronted with the fast dwindling popularity, continued criticism of his Young Blueberry version, and the potential growing realization that contracts signed with Philippe Charlier were not that advantageous for him, Blanc-Dumont lost all motivation and interest in further creating bande dessinées, which he himself admitted as much in 2025 (see quotebox). For the longest of times it looked like the conclusion of the intended two-volume Le convoi des bannis story would never see the day of light, made even more unlikely by the death of Corteggiani on 21 September 2022. Still, Blanc-Dumont had been working on the conclusion, albeit at a very slow pace. He posted a first update on his "L'univers de Michel Blanc-Dumont" Facebook page on 25 July 2016, which he followed up with eight short Facebook postings of partial page preview teasers over the 2016-18 time period to demonstrate that the concluding "L'antre du serpent" ("The lair of the serpent") volume had remained in the works all this time. The last of the page preview teasers (p. 37, usually with only nine more pages to go) was posted on 22 November 1918, with Blanc-Dumonts optimistically expecting the albums release to occur in the spring of 2019. This did not come to pass however, and six years later Blanc-Dumont came forward in June 2024 with the revised announcement that he now expected the album to be released in "early 2025", which did not come to fruition either as he himself had a year later to concede that the release had been postponed yet again. However, he concurrently emphasized that volume 22 would also be his very last Young Blueberry.

==== Translations ====
No formal post-original creators editions have seen the day of light in the English language as of 2016^{5}, but, like the source series, the Young Blueberry spin-off series did see translations in numerous languages, the three titles by the original creators and the Wilson outings specifically, but appreciatively less so for the subsequent releases. The latter is amply exemplified by the Corteggiani/Blanc-Dumont versions, which are not that favorably received – unlike the Wilson versions, whose first three outings were notably well received, in no small part due to the fact that they were still being written by co-creator Charlier – as indicated by its steadily diminishing popularity; had volume 12 still seen a French-language first-print run of 100.000 copies in 2001, by 2015 that number had dwindled to 40.000 (which is approaching the cut-off point for a standard Francophone BD album being economically viable to become published) when volume 21 was released, aside from the fact that several publishers had foregone the publication of these book titles in their countries altogether. Artist Blanc-Dumont was well aware of this circumstance, but put on a brave face when he in 2025 attributed the downfall to the general downward trend in the 21st century bande dessinées market.

As of 2019, the spin-off series by Corteggiani and Blanc-Dumont remains only published in French, Spanish, German, Dutch, Danish and Italian, a far cry from the nearly two dozen languages the main series had once been published in, or the by Colin Wilson penciled Young Blueberry volumes for that matter. Additionally, most non-French editions only enjoyed a print-run of no more than 5.000 copies. Worse still, in Croatia and Finland the Blanc-Dumont series only saw a partial one-time-only release before becoming canceled altogether, while Denmark and the Netherlands did not see any reprint-runs after their initial, small first printings, which is again a far cry from the main, and Wilson series. Ironically, that has made some sold out volumes expensive collectibles in these countries. The Germans and Norwegians (the latter likewise only seeing three individual Blanc-Dumont volumes released, though they added three more volumes into their Egmont omnibus collection version, before quitting the collection in 2010) were fortunate in this regard as those countries saw reprints as part of their 2006 aforementioned Egmont omnibus collections (the Danes had not even bothered to include the Blanc-Dumont series into their version of the Egmont omnibus collection, though they had been very keen to have the Wilson series version included); whereas the Spaniards enjoyed a reprint run in their 2017/19 "Edición Coleccionista" by Altaya, and the Italians two, in their 2014/16 "Collana Western" and 2022/23 "Collana Blueberry" releases, both published by RCS MediaGroup. The only countries known to have seen magazine (pre-)publications of Blanc-Dumont episodes were Italy, in the weekly magazine Skorpio during 2014, and Serbia, which saw a partial series publication between 2015 and 2018 in their monthly Stripoteka comic magazine. Local publishers in Serbia waived the release into a bonafide album format though.

==== Coda ====
Blanc-Dumont's 2024/25 announcement that he was done with the Young Blueberry series, also spelled almost certainly the definitive end of the (Young) Blueberry series as Giraud heir Isabelle inherited the right – shared equally with Philippe Charlier – to block the appointment of any and all new, third artist, a right which she, contrary to her late husband, has continued to exercise to this day, the below mentioned one-shot excepted.

In a sense, it was the maligned Colin Wilson who came out on top in the end. Not only have his Young Blueberry albums retained their popularity among fans, particularly the ones written by Charlier (a first-time Polish release of all his Blueberry work in one omnibus collection was published as recent as 2022), he has also managed to rebuild his comics career. Firstly in the US and subsequently in the UK and Italy (where he penciled a successful outing in the Italian Tex Willer series, another legendary European western comic), before coming full circle with a triumphant return on the Franco-Belgian bande dessineé scene which was topped of by a successful latter-day neo-western mini-series set in the 1920s, thereby completely thwarting the original intent of his erstwhile friend Corteggiani, who himself was rapidly fading into oblivion after 2015. That 2019–2021 series, Nevada, saw a partial return to the detailed meticulous art style Wilson had employed for his Young Blueberry work. Furthermore, when Wilson started to tour the comic-con and BD festival circuit again in the late-2000s, he quickly found out that the art he created for fans at album/comic book signing sessions (called "dédicases" in French) was in high demand and that of Blueberry in particular, especially when created in his best possible meticulously detailed Giraud-like dynamic art style which had made his Young Blueberry so popular with fans to begin with. Wilson continued to do so ever since right up until the present day, and has during signing sessions confided to sympathetic BD album store owners that the Blueberry art he creates on commission basis alone is currently already enough to earn him a decent living. As with the not-for-regular-publication Blueberry art his former mentor Giraud had created on personal title and for his own Moebius Production company, the quite prolific Young Blueberry art Wilson has made since then in like fashion, remains well outside the legal purview of Dargaud – which is clearly regulated in EU copyright law, where, contrary to the US, it is stipulated that the rights of artists are prevalent over those of publishers. Blanc-Dumont's similar art on the other hand, is shunned by Blueberry fans as a cursory glance on eBay (France) teaches the observer; owners of such art find that they can not even give away their possessions – though typically, this has not applied to his Cartland art, which has remained current to an extent.

=== Intermezzo: Marshal Blueberry ===
Marshal Blueberry

Publication information
- Publisher: Dargaud
- Format: Graphic novel
- Genre: Western
- Publication date: 1991-2000
- Main character: Mike S. Blueberry (born as Michael Steven Donovan)

Creative team
- Created by: Jean Giraud
- Written by: Jean Giraud (1991-2000); Thierry Smolderen (1993)
- Artist(s): William Vance (1991-1993); Michel Rouge (2000)
- Colorist(s): Petra (1991-1993); Scarlett (2000)

"That was an idea I had with Jean-Marc Lofficier. After we had acquired the approval from the [Charlier] heirs, it was Fabrice Giger, Alpen's editor-in-chief, who came up with the idea to select William Vance for the artwork. For the moment, the cycle with Vance is over [note: Giraud is referring to his scenario writing] and we give the series a little breather so it can sink in a little."

— Giraud, 1993, on conceiving the Marshal Blueberry spin-off series and somewhat contradicting his later 2010 statement.

"When Guy Vidal of Humanos brought me into contact with Jean Giraud at the time, he presented me with a story that I liked very much. But Giraud had written the script as a novel. The page division was still lacking, as were the dialogs. Furthermore he had planned to spread the story over two books. I suggested to expand that to three books. After I had finished the first Marshal Blueberry, I did not want to do all the work alone anymore. I did not have the time, nor did I want to do the work, others should have rightfully done. Thierry Smolderen subsequently worked out the script. But then I procrastinated. Dargaud had bought back Blueberry, Giraud had rejected part of Smolderen's script, altered the page divisions, etcetera. In the end I became fed up with the third book, and threw in the towel".

— Vance, 1996, on his experiences working on Marshal Blueberry.

This spin-off series was the second attempt, this time by Alpen Publishers, to further capitalize on the huge popularity both the main, and Wilson's Blueberry series enjoyed at the time. Written by co-creator Giraud, the series was set around the events depicted in The Lost Dutchman's Mine and dealt with scrupulous gun runners arming Apaches, thereby instigating an uprising. Giraud, who had just permanently returned from his extended stay in the US, was in effect still mourning the passing of Charlier and could not yet bring himself to embark on the art for Blueberry again, but wanted to pay homage to the legacy of his long-time writing partner by creating a story in his spirit, or as Giraud had put it: "[A]nd [I] said to myself: Well, I'm going to see if I'm able to write a story à la Charlier. So I wrote this scenario, not too bad, but quite traditional, quite classic".

Chosen by the publisher for the art work was William Vance, an accomplished Belgian comic artist in his own right and renowned for his XIII comic series. Vance, with whom Giraud had virtually no dealings in person before, drew the first two outings in the series which were colored by his life-long colaborist and wife Petra, but declined afterwards to continue, partly because he was required to finish an album in only four months (in Europe, one year was the typical mean to complete a comic book of 48 pages, but not rarely exceeds this time span in recent decades) and that he was unaccustomed to Giraud's style as script writer. Additionally, even though the first book sold 100.000 copies (while respectable, relatively modest compared to the contemporary print runs of the two other series, they being printed in numbers at the very least double that,) fans received the book with mixed feelings as Vance's style was a too radical departure to their tastes from that of Giraud. This actually was part of the reasons why Wilson's work for Young Blueberry was so favorably received and partly the reason why Blanc-Dumont's was not. While conceding that he found Vance's particular style "seductive but sometimes artificial" – having been pleased with the first album, but less so with the second – Giraud himself was disappointed and hurt by the defection of a professional like the established Vance for reasons of aesthetics and integrity, as he wanted the series to be executed by one artist only, deeming the defection "disastrous" for the series.

Jean Giraud and William Vance, page layout by René Follet

- 1: Sur ordre de Washington (Alpen Publishers, 1991/11, ISBN 2731609885)
- 2: Mission Sherman (Alpen Publishers, 1993/06, OCLC 801093625, no first printing ISBN issued)

==== Change of artist (II) ====
After Vance had thrown in the towel, the unresolved story cycle lingered in limbo for a further seven years, during which Alpen editor Thierry Smolderen went in search for a replacement for Vance, at one point considering up and coming BD artist Dominique Bertail (who was even asked to produce a couple of test plates), before Giraud in person finally found Michel Rouge – whose style was closer to his – willing to finish the cycle. For Rouge, Giraud modified his writing style by providing him with detailed page-layout sketches complete with dialog, which were quite faithfully adhered to by the artist. That Rouge's style resembled that of Giraud, was hardly a surprise, as Rouge was actually not a stranger to Blueberry. Twenty years earlier, when Rouge was still a quite unknown and aspiring comic artist, Giraud took him on as an apprentice and had him ink pages 15–35 of "La longue marche" in 1980 – thereby doing for an aspiring artist what Jijé had done for him nearly two decades before that. At the time it gave rise to the rumor that Giraud was planning to abandon his co-creation and that Rouge was groomed to take over the series. Though a rumor, there was a nuanced morsel of truth in it, as Rouge clarified two decades later: "No, he did not want to abandon Blueberry, but rather sought support and perhaps the opportunity to create books, like the ones he is currently doing [Mister Blueberry]. At the time, he was already playing with the notion of doing parallel series". Rouge's words notwithstanding though, and while he has never acted upon it in earnest, Giraud did later admit that there were "temptations" in that period of time. Though not Blueberry, Rouge himself did take over that other famed contemporary Franco-Belgian western comic series, Hermann's Comanche, but Rouge was not able to regain the popularity that series once enjoyed, when it was still penciled by Hermann, and the series was suspended indefinitely after Rouge had only added five titles to the series.

Jean Giraud and Michel Rouge

- 3: Frontière sanglante (Dargaud, 2000/06, ISBN 2205042777)

Originally intended to become a full-fledged series, the three Marshal Blueberry titles have remained the only outings in the series, though they too have seen several foreign language publications. Although not in France itself, several European countries have seen serialized magazine pre-publication of the first two titles. The third 2000 title though, was invariably directly released in book format for virtually all countries. No (formal) English language editions were released^{5}. Incidentally, in 2013 Giraud returned the favor Vance had provided for his co-creation, when he took on the art work of volume 18 for his XIII series, and which has seen English translations.

Despite Giraud's original intention to pay homage to his late co-worker, the series did not sit well with Charlier's heir, son Philippe. Citing his concerns for readers becoming confused by the addition of a third series taking place at a different point in time, he stated nine months after Giraud's death, "Thank God, Marshal was nothing more than a triptych. But some readers got a little lost by it." Considering his deep loathing of the deceased Giraud by then (see above and below), Philippe Charlier's ostensible "concern for the readers" appeared duplicitous at least, as he on the very same occasion advocated the inception of a plethora of spin-off series based on the secondary Blueberry characters.

=== Sequel: Blueberry 1900 ===
"After the first three volumes [of Marshal Blueberry], I've a scenario ready for Michel Blanc-Dumont. Curiously, it resembles several outings of his Jonathan Cartland series, because it has indians, a magical aspect, is dreamlike with a main character who is truly down on his luck. My mind is in a certain way fully taken up with the scenario and the theme of the first album as I've structured the story much like a cinematographic adaptation with more modern, more contemporary, pessimistic concepts by introducing the dreamlike aspects associated with the magic of the Indians".

— Giraud, on the original series concept he came up with in 1993.

"In it, Blueberry is 57 years old, the same age I am now, and he lives with the Hopi Indians. It is a kind of a merging between Moebius and Giraud, as it concerns a story about sorcerers and sjamans, quite out of this world".

"The story involves the assassination attempt on President McKinley. Neither Jimmy McClure nor Red Neck will appear in it. Additionally, I had the following for Blueberry 1900 in mind: President McKinley is lying in a coma and starts to levitate. Subsequently, they tie him to the bed so he does not float off, but then the whole bed starts to levitate. So now they have to nail down the whole bed. Blueberry 1900 – it has its origins in a smart dream, I have dreamt in the Pyrenees in 1981".

— Giraud, on his thoughts and intents for Blueberry 1900 in several comments made for contemporary magazine interviews.

"Philippe Charlier, son of Jean-Michel, was opposed because he guards over the consistency of the series. The Blueberry 1900 scenario was indeed very free and quite transgressive compared to the original depiction of Mike, even more pronounced so than the evolution of Jim Cutlass in his relationship to magic. I could not start this series anyway, as long as the Marshal Blueberry trilogy had not yet come to a conclusion. This would have caused too much confusion in the mind of the reader. François Boucq therefore could only start drawing after Vance had finished the third volume of Marshal...which he never did! In the meantime, Alexandro offered him Bouncer, which he naturally accepted. Of course, Blueberry 1900 would have been pretty good, but Bouncer is so great that it would have been unbearable for me to have prevented such a series seeing the day of light. Even so, my frustration with my own scenario became total, forcing me to rework and update it, no doubt improving it as I go along, and I in particular will have to decide on how to proceed".

— Giraud, 2008, in a public reaction on Blueberry 1900 not coming to fruition.

A third spin-off series, coined Blueberry 1900, was conceived by original creator Giraud in as early as 1993, intended as a bonafide sequel series. Set, as the series title already implied, in the era of the William McKinley presidency, it would not only have featured a 57-year old Blueberry, but his adult son as well, albeit in a minor role. The story line, intended to encompass five albums, was to take place around events surrounding the assassination of President McKinley. Pegged for the artwork was French BD artist François Boucq whom Giraud had met at a BD event in honor of his lifelong friend Jean-Claude Mézières, and concurrently discussed the project with. Actually, Giraud had previously approached Michel Blanc-Dumont, whose "lyric" art work for Jonathan Cartland he adored, for the project in 1993, then still tentatively called Blueberry 20 ans après (Blueberry, 20 years later). Blanc-Dumont, despite being reciprocally an admirer of Giraud's art and aside from being still invested in his own Western BD, thought the project not suitable for him, deeming the script outline too Mœbiusienne for his taste, and had already suggested Boucq instead. Boucq showed interest and was enthusiastic about the project, and indeed embarked on the production of pre-publication art studies, but deemed a cycle of five albums too much, managing to negotiate it down to a cycle of three albums.

However, Philippe Charlier, son of the late Jean-Michel Charlier and proprietor of "JMC Aventures" – the foundation and legal copyright owner, set up back in 1990 with the specific intent to safeguard the creative integrity and legacy of his father, both in a spiritual as well as a commercial sense, but which had become dormant after the failed experiment at Alpen Publishers – was nowhere near as enthusiastic as Boucq was. He became increasingly alarmed and downright aghast when reading commentaries, Giraud made in contemporary magazine interviews, clarifying his intentions and premises for the proposed series of a Blueberry residing with the Hopi tribe, meditating under the influence of mind-expanding substances, while President McKinley was levitating in the White House due to a Hopi spell. As heir and steward of his father's co-creations and legacy, being the 50% co-owner of the Blueberry brand, he still had the unequivocal right to veto any and all proposals regarding the trademark Blueberry and did not hesitate for a moment to exercise his prerogative in this case, going as far as threatening Giraud with a lawsuit, resulting in that the project fell through. As per a horrified Charlier Jr. in a contemporary statement: "The script is unbelievably horrifying. It is an effrontery, constructed out of implausible circumstances. Like in the new [OK Corral] story cycle, we find a totally passive Blueberry, only meditating, while the president, enchanted by Indians, is levitating in the White House". As he indicated, though he had given his seal of approval in this case, Charlier Jr., also became wary and disapproving of Giraud depicting the former lieutenant as a passive loafer in the OK Corral story arc, only aggravated from his point of view by the fact that Giraud could not refrain himself from including some elements from Native-American mysticism in "OK Corral" and "Dust" – though not anywhere near as extensive as he had apparently intended for Blueberry 1900.

Philippe Charlier, conservative by nature like his father, had, unlike his father, no patience whatsoever with Giraud's "New Age" predilections (also serving as an additional rationale for his decision to proceed with Alpen Publishers back in 1990, instead of Les Humanoïdes Associés, renowned for its catalog of more adult, "esoteric" BDs, like those of Boucq and Alejandro Jodorowsky), particularly for his admitted fondness for mind-expanding substances. It was he (after his father's death), who testified in a deposition, that his father had always "detested" Giraud's work as "Mœbius" and that he considered that work as "treason", after which Giraud – known for his lifelong aversion to any kind of legal proceedings – backed down. While Philippe was unable to stop the OK Corral cycle, because of the "longest living survivor" main series covenant Giraud and Charlier Sr. had signed, he was legally able to stop Giraud in his tracks for Blueberry 1900 because it had never been presented by Giraud as a main series effort, but rather as a brand expansion (notice the legal difference), and on this Charlier Jr. had veto rights.^{14} Reinforced by the for him favorable court ruling, Charlier Jr. was therefore subsequently able to veto Giraud's 1999 scenario outline for a Fort Mescalero movie, which was to feature Blueberry in extensive substance-induced hallucinatory scenes, besides Giraud's intention to have the Jim Cutlass series merge with the Blueberry main series, due to the fact that later volumes of that series also increasingly incorporated likewise scenes, arguing that such a merging would indeed constitute another brand extension.

How far Giraud actually already was in his thinking was exemplified by the inclusion of his art featuring Blueberry with Hopi tribesmen, endowed with the caption "In Hopi Towns", as the interior flyleaf illustration for the regular 1990 "Arizona Love" French album release, reprinted as such, without the caption, in the last 1991 Graphitti Designs release, Moebius #9. Additionally, Giraud had sneaked in some Blueberry 1900 elements (including floating Washington dignitaries) in the non-Blueberry, Native-American themed, short story "The Words of Chief Seattle", which saw English publication in Epic's second Blueberry book release, "Ballad for a Coffin".

Giraud's fascination with shamanism went even further back than that, when he was introduced by Jodorowsky – during the failed Dune-project – in 1974 to the writings of Carlos Castaneda, who had written a series of books that describe his training in shamanism, particularly with a group whose lineage descended from the Toltecs. The books, narrated in the first person, related his experiences under the tutelage of a Yaqui "Man of Knowledge" named Don Juan Matus. Castaneda's writings made a deep and everlasting impression on Giraud, already open to Native-Mexican folk culture due to his three previous extended trips to the country (he had visited the country a third time in 1972, also see Giraud on Carlos Castaneda), and it did influence his art as "Mœbius", particularly in regard to dream sequences, though he was not quite able to work in such influences in his mainstream Blueberry BD. Yet, unbeknownst to writer Charlier, he did already sneak in some Castaneda elements in "Nez Cassé". Castaneda's influence reasserted itself in full in Giraud's later life, having worked in elements more openly after Charlier's death in "Geronimo l'Apache", becoming, as indicated, a major element for Blueberry 1900.

==== Ramifications ====
Boucq was disappointed with the project falling through, disagreeing with Charlier Jr.'s assessment: "Quite the contrary, depicting him as an old man, forced us to endow him with a special kind of dignity". Yet, for him it turned out to be a blessing in disguise eventually, as it became an inspiration for Jodorowsky (co-creator of Giraud's acclaimed Incal series, and already a frequent Boucq collaborator), to co-create with him their own acclaimed western BD, Bouncer. Even the fictional "Fort Mescalero" has resurfaced as Blueberry's first Far West posting in the 2007 prequel album Apaches, aside from the fact that much of what he had envisioned for this project actually turned up in the 2004 Blueberry movie. As a warming-up for Blueberry 1900, Boucq and Giraud had already collaborated on a Native-American themed project when they both contributed to the 1995 "Laissé Pour Mort", a to 500 pieces limited CD/Portfolio release from Parisian-based publisher Stardom, Giraud's own publishing house/art gallery, ran at the time by his second wife Isabelle. Later, in 2008, Giraud submitted a "Blueberry-meets-Bouncer" contribution to the 250-piece limited "Bouncer" art portfolio from short-lived publisher Osidarta, aside from providing a foreword.

Despite Charlier Jr.'s vehement resistance, Giraud himself seemed to have never abandoned the notion of doing Blueberry 1900 as was evidenced in a 2008 interview, when he was asked if he would ever return to Blueberry after he had once stated in a prior magazine interview that he was done with his creation upon the conclusion of the OK Corral story arc. Giraud's answer was: "Looking back at it, I realized that I really wanted to continue Blueberry. This would probably not be the case if I were to re-start a cycle of 5 albums, because I do not think I have the energy left for another ten years of work. Actually, I want to take up the idea of Blueberry 1900 again, which has a very realistic side, sometimes a more crazy one: the Indians were a magical people, that was part of their culture, and I want to stage the collision between our world, through the conquest of the West, and the world of Indians who resist. It is often shown how events took place in a strategic sense, but I wish to plunge into Indian sociology, like it was done in Dances with Wolves, by replacing our materialistic vision of the world, and by explaining the clash of cultures that took place. Of course, there is a certain challenge in doing the story this way, because I might possibly yank the rug from under the feet of the reader. I still have to rework the script and do the page divisions, but I think it will take between 100 and 200 pages". Giraud's death in 2012 ended all notions of a Blueberry 1900 installment, and quite possibly any further installment of the main series as well.

In December 2012, nine months after Giraud's death, a lengthy interview with Philippe Charlier was published in the French BD journal Casemate. In it, Charlier Jr., taking considerable care not to speak out of turn for the Giraud heirs, laid out his vision for the future of the Blueberry series. He explained that he saw no reason why of all his father's creations, Blueberry should be the only one left without a future, and that if the main series was to be continued (which he fully expected) he would only sign off on Young Blueberry artist Michel Blanc-Dumont as the main artist – unsurprisingly perhaps, considering the exploitative nature of the contracts signed, which were designed to mostly benefit Charlier Jr. in particular. He justified that choice by claiming that he had been the late Giraud's favorite as well – Charlier Jr. was apparently unaware that Giraud had over the years become increasingly disenchanted with the quality of Blanc-Dumont's art, which he had previously admired. (see above). Furthermore, Charlier Jr, inspired by similar initiatives launched for the equally successful Thorgal and XIII (William Vance's magnum opus) BD series, fully advocated the launch of multiple spin-off productions based on the secondary characters introduced in the two Blueberry series (Charlier Jr. did not consider Marshal Blueberry as part of Blueberry canon), to be created by artists of his own choosing. When checking in over the telephone with both publisher Dargaud and Giraud's widow Isabelle on a potential main series continuation, the insensitive Casemate editors received an irked "far too soon to be even discussed" reply from Dargaud, and a very terse and curt "A continuation? Why not." reply from the still grieving Isabelle Giraud.

Philippe Charlier's vision of a large, commercialized and lucrative multi-media Blueberry-franchise came to naught however, for two reasons. Firstly, Blanc-Dumont had effectively all but retired from the bande dessinée industry in 2015, which was in part due to the commercial failure of his Young Blueberry version in the end. Secondly, and more pertinently, heir Isabelle Giraud turned was very protective of her late husband's artistic and commercial legacy. Having witnessed the conflict between Charlier Jr. and her husband in the last decade-and-a-half of his life, as related in the below-listed 2015 Numa Sadoul biography, Isabelle Giraud has until 2019 not approved a single Blueberry publication project beyond the 2012 Intégrale omnibus collection or permitted a new artist to continue the main project, or Young Blueberry series – in stark contrast to her late husband's work signed as "Mœbius". Like Jijé's widow before her, Isabelle Giraud had no intention of letting Philippe Charlier profit from her late husband's body of work beyond what he was legally entitled to.

== The Blueberry biography ==
"In my function as literary editor, I also amused myself by mounting a massive hoax. It was meant to expand a bit upon the knowledge of Blueberry's past that I had introduced in the full Jeunesse stories. As an aside, I humbly apologize to the respectable professors and other eminent historians who have rock solidly believed in it, and who have overwhelmed me with requests for my sources. The idea came to me at the National Archives in Washington, when I was looking for old pictures for a television show. One of them caught my eye on a pile of documents dating from the Civil War. It showed a young, anonymous officer, serving in the cavalry of the Union, who resembled the young Blueberry as drawn by Jean Giraud. It was too beautiful! I could not resist! I acquired a lot of other pictures of the era, representing southern plantations, black slaves in cotton fields, scenes of the Civil War, trains, forts, Mississippi Show Boats ... And, using them as starting point, I wrote the detailed biography of Mike Steve Donovan, alias Blueberry, which can now be read at the start of the album "Ballade pour un cercueil". I mingled many real facts and characters that had really existed into my imaginary biography. Thanks to the photos brought back from Washington, it became a flagrant truth. To complete this forgery, that amused me immensely, I commissioned my graphic artist Peter Glay for the superb false historical portrait that you can also admire. A detail that should not be lacking in all this pizzazz, the officers represented on Blueberry sides are, in reality, comic artists Jean-Marc Reiser and Jean Tabary, who were relatively unknown at the time, but who have come a long way since the time they posed as Blue Coats! This hoax worked beyond all hopes: thousands of readers believed in the real existence of Blueberry, following the publication of this false, with authentic photos illustrated, biography. That my victims may forgive me: si non è vero è bene trovato!"

— Charlier, in a latter-day accounting for his Blueberry biography.

"Blueberry can not die, I have the certainty and proof of that ever since I have read the biography, Charlier has written before he left us. He is such a rich character that people can not imagine him disappearing. According to Jean-Michel, Blueberry has even rubbed shoulders with Eliot Ness. The history of such a character can not have an ending".

"With that biography, we encumbered ourselves with a mind-boggling task. We had created the possibility to highlight Blueberry in a panoramic manner by concurrently publish several different series, in which he is young, less young and, why not, old eventually. We even could have told the story of his death without ending the series. Blueberry is a particularly intimate life companion. He is part of me, but it should not become an obsession. That is the reason why I have given him the chance to escape me by entrusting him to others. In essence, it has become Blueberry's fate to be condemned to life by his creators".

— Giraud, on his firm conviction that, due to the biography, Blueberry is now for the ages, and how it has allowed the Blueberry universe to expand beyond the boundaries of the main series.

In 1974 Charlier had a sixteen-page background article added to "Ballade pour un cercueil" (OCLC 893750651), when the book was first released. The article concerned a fictitious biography of Mike Steve Donovan, alias Mike S. Blueberry, detailing his life from birth to death, and written from a historic, journalistic point of view. When asked about it a decade later, Charlier clarified that once it became clear to him that Blueberry had become the central character of the series he had conceived, he then already postulated in his mind the broad strokes of the complete life and works of his creation, including the reasons for Blueberry's broken nose and odd alias. By the time "Ballade pour un cercueil" was ready for its book release, Charlier deemed the moment had arrived to entrust his musings to paper. There had been a practical reason as well for this. The story already ran 16 pages over-length and as contemporary printers printed eight double-sided comic book pages on one sheet of print paper, the addition of the 16-page biography was not that much of a bother for their production process. "Ballade pour un cercueil" therefore became one of the first Franco-Belgium comic albums to break the mold of the hitherto standard 48-page count format.

Currently somewhat of a staple in European comics, at that time the inclusion of an informative background section in a comic book of that size and wealth of detail was hitherto unheard of and a complete novelty, and what Charlier had not foreseen was that many in the pre-internet era mistook the biography for real, factual history, propagating it as such in other outside media as well. Charlier, who also was an investigative journalist and a documentary maker with a solid reputation for thorough documentation, had previously already written several, shorter historical Old West background editorials for the 1969-1970 Super Pocket Pilote series (issues 4–9) as companion pieces for the Jeunesse de Blueberry shorts, which were historically accurate – and, incidentally, working much of the material contained therein, especially the photographs, into the biography for the post-war era – and readers of the pre-internet-era therefore assumed that the biography was likewise.

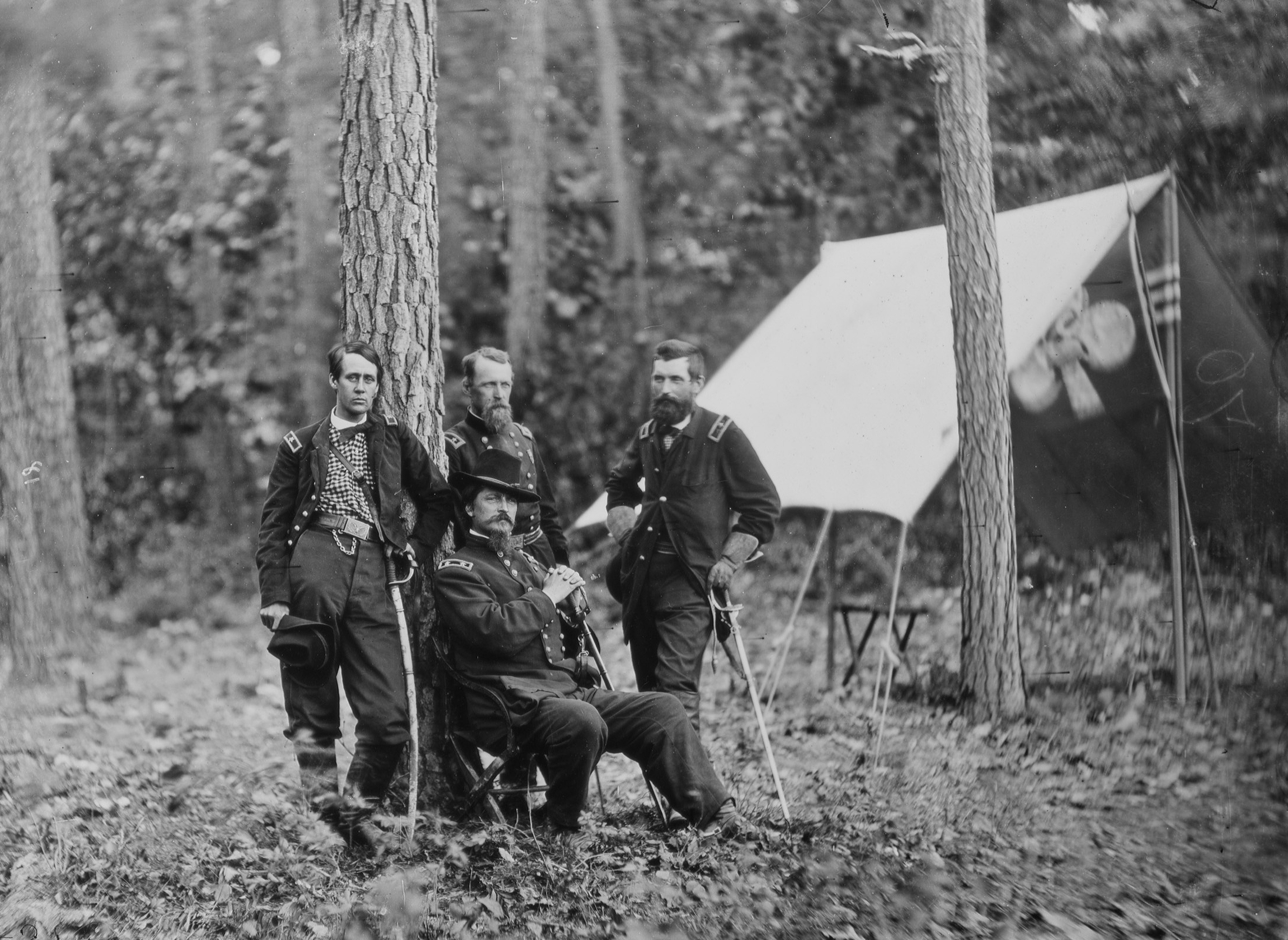
Charlier's "young, anonymous officer" on the far left, presented as "the only known photo of Blueberry" on page 10 of the biography. The photo actually depicts Union General Francis C. Barlow

Still, having written the biography within the historical context as postulated in the comic, fully expecting his readership to understand it as such, Charlier originally had not the intention to perform a prank at the expense of his readers, despite him later presenting it as such in the above statement, mischievously poking fun at the "respectable" and "eminent", but gullible, scholars (while carefully not including the non-scholar Blueberry fanbase) – and which was in concordance with biographer Ratier's observation of the author's penchant for "taking liberties" with actual events for dramatic effect. His "it was meant to expand a bit upon the knowledge of Blueberry's past" statement was actually indicative of his original intent on top of the incongruous circumstance that he had already left the employ of Dargaud and Pilote in 1972 as before-mentioned. A baffled Charlier had declared on a prior occasion: "I have written a fictitious biography on Blueberry, accompanied by photographs found in American archives, and the whole world fell for it!", having already stated on an even earlier occasion: "To this very day, because of "Ballade pour un cercueil" in which we gave Blueberry with a photographs illuminated biography, I still receive letters from readers – not from kids mind you, but from grownups – asking how on Earth we have managed to track down the real Blueberry. There are people who take it as real fact". The photos were indeed authentic, though their captions were not. To complete the appearance of a bonafide in-universe biography, a Civil War-era style group portrait, featuring Blueberry and flanked by the by Charlier mentioned comic artists, was included, ostensibly recently discovered and from the hand of American artist Peter Glay, but in reality created by Pierre Tabary under the pseudonym. Tabary, brother of Jean, was a French book illustrator of some renown himself, also working for Pilote as illustrator for their magazine editorials at the time. Incidentally, a salient detail was that events, as related in the biography, in Blueberry's life directly upon war's end, but before he arrived in the Far West, eventually became those of Jim Cutlass, the other Giraud/Charlier western.

J.M. Lofficier has translated the biography in English, specifically for inclusion in the Graphitti Designs anthology collection (it was not featured in the originating Epic/ComCat editions), published in the fourth volume of the collection, Moebius #4. Lofficier however, took it upon himself to slightly edit Charlier's original text in order to reflect Blueberry's life as featured in the post-1974 publications (despite being reprinted numerous times, not only in French but in other languages as well, Charlier himself has never revisited his original text again), and as such it is not an entirely faithful translation as some elements were added, whereas some others were omitted, such as the aforementioned notion of a fully rehabilitated and to captain promoted Blueberry ultimately heading a unit of Apache scouts.

== Legacy ==
=== Second tier Blueberry-related spin-off series ===
These concern spin-off creations that have very strong ties with the Blueberry series, but which differ in this respect from the aforementioned sub-series that neither Blueberry himself, nor any of the major secondary characters, appear in these creations.

==== Jim Cutlass ====
Jim Cutlass

Publication information
- Publisher: Dargaud, Les Humanoïdes Associés, Casterman
- Format: Graphic novel
- Genre: Western
- Publication date: 1979–1999
- Main character(s): Jim Cutlass, Carolyn Grayson

Creative team
- Created by: Jean-Michel Charlier; Jean Giraud
- Written by: Jean-Michel Charlier (1976-1989†), Jean Giraud (1991-1999); Christian Rossi (1991-1999)
- Artist(s): Jean Giraud (1976-1979); Christian Rossi (1991-1999)
- Colorist(s): Jean Giraud (1976); Isabelle Beaumenay-Joannet (1979); Christian Rossi (1991-1999)

Even though neither Blueberry nor any of the major secondary characters of the main series has made an appearance, or are referenced to, in this bande dessinée (BD) series, Jim Cutlass is of all the second-tier spin-off series the one that is most inextricably associated with the main series, even more so than all the hereafter mentioned productions – and even more so than the Marshal Blueberry intermezzo series in fact, due to that series complete lack of Jean-Michel Charlier involvement. In effect, the Jim Cutlass series exclusively owes its very existence to the Blueberry main series.

It was actually the 1974-1979 Blueberry royalties conflict that lay at the very heart of the Jim Cutlass series origin history. Two years after the conflict had started and in which Georges Dargaud had stubbornly refused to budge, he, acting like it was business as usual, brazenly asked Charlier for a Blueberry short story for a Western special he had planned as a June 1976 side publication of Pilote magazine. Charlier however, had no intention whatsoever to add yet another Blueberry title to a body of work that was already under contention, and found, as expected, his co-creator Giraud in full agreement. "The Blueberry magazine rights, " Giraud had declared, "were a year before I embarked on Jim Cutlass the subject of a dispute between the Pilote people and I. When they afterwards asked me for my contribution to a western special issue of Pilote, the relationships had somewhat improved, but I was dead-set on not wanting Blueberry to appear in Pilote ever again. We were already in negotiations with other magazines for that bande dessinée. It was therefore essentially a copyright issue that made Charlier and I invent another western hero." The primary reason for both creators to give in to Dargaud's request after all with a western short story, can only be construed as a token of goodwill of not wanting to shut the door on their parent publisher permanently, thereby leaving some wriggling room for future negotiations. As implied by Giraud however, Charlier took great care that the story copyrights were covered by his EdiFrance/EdiPresse syndicate agency's magazine exemption clause – he had already reactivated two years earlier to have "Angel Face" appear in Nouveau Tintin instead of Pilote –, meaning that the two creators retained full ownership of their new creation, and not publisher Dargaud where its Blueberry ownership had been the very root cause of the conflict in the first place.

As intended, the 17-page short story, entitled "Mississippi River", appeared in the "Special Western" companion issue of Pilote number 25 of June 1976, which had by then become a monthly magazine. At that time still lacking a series title, as it was originally intended as a one-off publication, the story involved a northerner who very shortly before the outbreak of the Civil War travels to New Orleans, Louisiana in order to claim his inheritance, a plantation. On his way, he meets several firebrand southern secessionists and as a decided abolitionist runs into serious troubles with several of them after helping a slave escape. For "Mississippi River" Giraud used the very same, what Charlier had coined "less convoluted", art style he had already used for his Young Blueberry short stories as created for Super Pocket Pilote eight years earlier, even though the plates for the "Special Wéstern" issue were twice the size of those of Super Pocket Pilote.

Three years later, the Blueberry royalties conflict had flared up again in full force, and Jim Cutlass found himself quite unexpectedly smack in the middle of the conflict, front and center. Charlier and Giraud had decided to turn up the pressure on publisher Dargaud by having the long and eagerly awaited "Broken Nose" Blueberry outing pre-published in Métal Hurlant magazine instead of Pilote. In addition, they had decided to revisit their 1976 short story and expand it into a full-blown 60-page story, and have it pre-published in Métal Hurlant magazine a short while later as well, in order to make it crystal clear to publisher Dargaud that the Blueberry creators had options. In an effort to turn up the heat on Dargaud even further, the album was already released by the by Giraud co-founded publisher Les Humanoïdes Associés before the pre-publication in Métal Hurlant had even run its course, and before Dargaud had the chance to release the "Broken Nose" album. As already related, the pressure had no effect on Dargaud and the Blueberry creators left their parent publisher – definitively in Charlier's case, as it turned out – for greener pastures elsewhere. Incidentally, neither "Broken Nose" nor "Mississippi River" saw publication in Heavy Metal though, the US counterpart of Métal Hurlant.

The original short story was either by coincidence or by design written by Charlier as an open-ended story, which made it suitable to expand into a full-blown history. The story picks up after the original short – which was republished completely unaltered – with Cutlass returning to Louisiana right after the war in which he had served as a Union lieutenant, to find his inheritance in a dilapidated state, only inhabited by his cousin Carolyn Grayson, his co-inheritor of the plantation, who had suffered greatly at the hands of Union marauders during the war. In his efforts to revitalize the plantation, Cutlass has to deal with all the woes that had befallen the South directly upon war's end, carpet baggers, marauding ex-slaves, the KKK, looting deserters from both armies, as well as the surviving enemies he had made just before the war, only to be embezzled out of his inheritance in the end by his cousin Carolyn, after which he has no other choice but to return to the army. Charlier was inspired in part by the 1939 classic movie Gone with the Wind, but mostly by his own Blueberry biography he had written five years earlier, as all immediate post-war events that befell Cutlass he had originally envisioned to be those of Blueberry himself. Though like Blueberry an anti-hero, Charlier took care to make the ginger-headed Cutlass as different as possible, making him in essence a deeply flawed self-serving loser, completely unencumbered by Blueberry's sense of morality and justice. In addition, none of Cutlass's plans seemed to work out as he also lacked his colleague's on his feet thinking in tight spots, only prevailing through blind luck.

Realizing full well that the publication of the expanded story was time sensitive in order to have it out before the "Broken Nose" album release, Giraud was forced to produce the art at a breakneck pace, one page a day. To do so, he was forced to create his art in a seemingly even less "convoluted" manner than he already had employed for the original short. He stated in 1982, " Well, that BD needed an adapted drawing technique. I had to produce one page a day!! If you have to work at such speed, great detailing goes out the window and you can not reason out everything beforehand. Spontaneity and clarity are all-important in this story." Even though there is a difference of day and night between the art of this story and "Broken Nose", considerable thought did go into page layout and readability to make the story easily accessible, even more so than the very "convoluted" "Broken Nose" in which the meticulously detailed "Mœbius" artwork style had made its appearance.

Fans were totally taken by surprise by the unexpected publication of Jim Cutlass, but also puzzled why it was created in the first place. Not privy to the behind-the-scenes going-ons at Dargaud, an incorrect, by French BD critic Jean-Pierre Mercier initiated, rumor started to make the rounds that both Métal Hurlant publisher Les Humanoïdes Associés and Giraud were in desperate need of a financial injection, and that a western "quickie" by Giraud was the only way to get it. While Mercier was right in his assessment of the publisher's financial difficulties at that time, he was completely led astray by a flippant and prosaic statement Giraud had made around the same time he had made his "copyright issue" statement above. He then concurrently stated in another interview, "I started with Jim Cutlass because I needed the money to pay for the furnishing of my new house." Incidentally, Giraud had already made a contemporary similar flippant remark in regard to "Broken Nose".

Still, Blueberry fans, pleased with another Giraud western, took to the Jim Cutlass publication with a fervor, and the album did quite well in sales. Over time, it eventually saw almost as many foreign language translations as any outing of the Blueberry main series had, which included one in English. However, since the album failed in its primary objective, i.e. move Dargaud into the creators' desired direction, the creators deemed it no longer worthwhile to pursue the series any further.

Table of English translations of the original French title
#	French title (original magazine publication)	French original book release (publisher, yyyy/mm, ISBN)	English saga title	English title and data	Notes
1	Mississippi River - Original short story (Pilote: "Special Wéstern", issue 25bis, Dargaud, 1976/06)	Les Humanoïdes Associés, 1979/11, ISBN 2731600098	n/a	Mississippi River (Epic, January 1990, ISBN 0871357151; Moebius #9, Graphitti Designs, 1991, ISBN 0936211350)	
1	Mississippi River - Full extended story (Métal Hurlant, issues 44-46, Les Humanoïdes Associés, 1979)	Les Humanoïdes Associés, 1979/11, ISBN 2731600098	n/a	Mississippi River (Epic, January 1990, ISBN 0871357151; Moebius #9, Graphitti Designs, 1991, ISBN 0936211350)	

"At the time of the end of the Aedena editions, I proposed to Charlier and Giraud, on the advice of Alain David, that Christian take over the Jim Cutlass series Humanos was about to lose. The art mini-portfolio that we published in 1987 was a sort of trial run. The series was intended to appear in a free magazine that we were trying to put together with Charlier. The publication then went to Casterman when I started working for them, but Charlier's death delayed the release of the publication."

— Jean Annestay, Aedena editor-in-chief, 2022, on his claim of suggesting Christian Rossi to the Jim Cutlass creators.

"I was working on the third Chariot de Thepsis when Jean-Claude Forest, who was working at Bayard at the time, asked me to collaborate with Charlier. He was nostalgic for the maritime adventures of Bernard Tempête which were published before the war. He wanted to make a "remake"” of it with Charlier as scenario writer. Jean-Michel Charlier was part of all my reading as a teenager, but I was swamped with my own work and, moreover, I no longer wished to be involved with those kind of genres. Later, I found myself in contact with Jean Amnestay and the people of Aedena. They were on a magazine project paid for by sponsors (Hugh!), with the reactivation of Charlier's series including Jim Cutlass. They then spoke about me to Jean-Michel and Giraud, who agreed to the idea of my possible takeover. My friends Alexandre Coutelis and Patrice Pellerin had warned me of the inconveniences caused by Charlier's tardiness with scripts, but they were both happy for me! So I went to see Charlier with a kind of battle plan to show both my real interest but also a certain distance. With him, I never entered into a cronyistic relationship; on the contrary, I showed him respect. Knowing of his tardiness by now, my tactic was to call him systematically to ask him for work when I was doing something else or when I had not yet started drawing the four to eight pages he had previously delivered to me. He promised to send it to me within the week and, of course, it took around a month, which gave me time to finish up his previous delivery..."

— Cristian Rossi, 2011 on being suggested to, and working with, Jean-Michel Charlier.

Because of its failure as a means of pressure, "Mississippi River" remained a one-shot publication for little over a decade. However, Jean-Michel Charlier had been busy since 1987 to revive most of his older BD creations for intended publication in a new, yet to be launched BD magazine, beyond the ones he had already revived/created for Koralle/Novedi, explaining the pile of scripts Giraud saw on Charlier's desk when he visited him six months before his death. One of these older creations Charlier had intended to revive, was Jim Cutlass. Acutely aware that Giraud had his plate full with not only Blueberry, but also his various "Mœbius" endeavors, which included The Incal series, Charlier went in search for a replacement artist for the series, which he initially thought to have found in the Italian artist Gaetano Liberatore, who at that time was riding high on his anarchistic RanXerox BD. An arranged meeting with French artist Christian Rossi though, eventually made Charlier decide to select him as the new Jim Cutlass artist.

Giraud was not entirely left out the loop as it was his own publishing house Aedena, he had co-founded in 1984, where Charlier with the Aedena founders had planned to launch the BD magazine Hugh!, in which his revived BD series were to be published, Jim Cutlass among them. And it explained the trial run "Rossi: Jim Cutlass" art mini-portfolio Annestay was referring to in the quote box above at Aedena, which thereby became one of the very last releases of that publisher in 1987. The for Charlier inconvenient Aedena bankruptcy also served as a rationale why he subsequently approached Fabrice Giger in 1988 – behind Giraud's back this time – who ironically, had just bought Les Humanoïdes Associés, the very same Humanos Jim Cutlass was intended to be taken away from.

When Annestay eventually called Rossi to offer him the Jim Cutlass series, he "(...)needed about a quarter of a second to think it through, and say yes immediately". He was motivated to do so because, "[t]here was only one Cutlass album, but mostly because it was not Blueberry. I have always loved the Cutlass character in a hot and intimate manner, because he is so full of temperament and passion, because he has a pathos that is less apparent in Blueberry. And because I loved the loose art style. And in this roundabout manner I was able to meet Jean - professionally." Rossi incidentally, was no stranger to offbeat western BDs, as he had already created his own 1982-1987 Le Chariot de Thespis series which ran for four volumes before he, due to the mediocre measure of commercial success, decided to drop it in order to take on Jim Cutlass.

Shortly before Charlier's death, he was persuaded by Rossi to select Casterman as the publisher of the revived Cutlass series. "It was I who pushed Jean-Michel Charlier to go with Casterman! Jean Annestay found himself at Casterman after the bankruptcy of Aedena. The Hugh! magazine project did not see the light of day and Jean-Michel wanted to stop with Novedi. He no longer wanted to go with Dargaud but he had a contract offer with Alpen. I didn't know this publisher, the future Humanoïdes Associés [sic.], and we negotiated with the Casterman people; It went very well and we ended up with this completely atypical BD in their monthly À Suivre magazine, like Julius [note: a contemporary Rossi non-western BD series] had been in L'Écho des savanes! But they liked it, did a little promotion and believed in it! This is how Cutlass escaped this intention of Fabrice Giger and Humanos to lay claim on all the Charlier material." Despite his very advanced negotiations with Giger, Charlier conceded in this particular case, because of his staunch conviction that bande dessinées were first and foremost magazine publications, which Alpen had not in place – nor would they ever have.

Charlier's death on 10 July 1989 delayed the debut at Casterman of the second Jim Cutlass outing. At the time of his death, Charlier's scenario, he had endowed with the working title "K.K.K.", was finished up until and including page 36, after which it was up to Giraud to finish it, much like he had to do with "Arizona Love". Actually, it was Rossi who wrote a story synopsis for the remaining pages 37–64 and who asked Charlier's widow if he could proceed. After gaining her permission, he sought out Giraud for further advice and was given four pages with detailed dialog and scenario notes after which Rossi was able to rearrange the preliminary page layouts into the final ones. The freedom he got from Giraud became the template for their future cooperation together. Neither were the negotiations with Casterman finalized yet, and Giraud in particular made use of the opportunity to hammer out a very advantageous deal for himself. He secured a compensation of 5,000 FF (roughly US$587 in 1989 prices) per page and an increase of his album royalties to 13%, which was double the then-going industry rate. He was able to do this by playing off Giger's Humanoïdes Associés and Casterman against each other, demonstrating he had learned well from his late writing partner, but arguably also allowing his displeasure at Charlier's surreptitious negotiations with Giger to vent.

After the completion of the last 30 pages, the by Giraud to "L'Homme de la Nouvelle-Orleans" ("The Man from New-Orleans") re-titled story, started its belated serialized pre-publication in À suivre's July 1990 issue no. 150, accompanied by a proudly written two-page editorial (pp. 45–46).

Jean-Michel Charlier/Jean Giraud and Christian Rossi

- 2: L'Homme de la Nouvelle-Orleans (Casterman, 1991/01, ISBN 2203347023)

Christian Rossi is a dream artist, he is perfect! This is the ideal that I would love to achieve when I draw my own stories. His depths of field, his perspectives, his sets and his costumes are very neat, precise, exact, clear and seamless. However, like me, Christian suffers from his deficiencies, imaginary or not, and he is never content. I really like Cutlass, it's a fabulous series and the scripts are really great, because it's like the work of film scriptwriters. Christian reacts to what I write to him and he reworks the whole page layout, adapting it to his narration. Sometimes, he rewrites certain scenes that seem drifting to him. Christian has this rare quality of loving stories and serve them to the maximum."

— Giraud, 1996, on his working experience with Rossi.

The publication of À Suivre was terminated by Casterman in 1997, which also meant the termination of the Jim Cutlass serialized magazine pre-publication. The last two series outings were therefore released directly in album format. As explored above Giraud had intended to incorporate Blueberry into the Jim Cutlass series, but this was met by an immediate veto by Charlier heir Philippe because he abhorred Giraud's "New Age" predilections; in the later volumes of the series voodoo elements, dream sequences, and Afro-American sorcery started to play an ever increasing role in the story lines. And while Philippe Charlier was unable to veto the series proper as it too fell under the Blueberry "longest survivor contracts" Giraud had signed with his father, he was entitled to veto any "brand extension" that did not meet with his approval. And even though it did enjoy a certain following, being in some countries reprinted to this day, the series – its last two volumes particularly – was unable to achieve anything near the commercial success of the series that had spawned it, and the two artists decided to throw in the towel after volume 7 was released in 1999, leaving the original creators' debut album the series' most popular and successful one.

Jean Giraud and Christian Rossi

- 3: L'alligator blanc (Casterman, 1993/09, ISBN 2203364041)
- 4: Tonnerre au Sud (Casterman, 1995/01, ISBN 2203364076)
- 5: Jusqu'au cou ! (Casterman, 1997/08, ISBN 2203364114)
- 6: Colts, Fantômes et Zombies (Casterman, 1998/10, ISBN 2203364122)
- 7: Nuit noire (Casterman, 1999/09, ISBN 2203364130)

It has not hurt Rossi's BD career however, as he did create several successful series afterwards, including his latter-day W.E.S.T. western, which featured supernatural overtones.

==== Die Frau mit dem Silberstern ====
This German-language comic, which translates as "The Woman with the Silver Star", was created in its entirety by German comics artist Martin Frei. It debuted in September 2021 and concerned a sequel to "The Man with the Silver Star" and revolves around the later adventures of the two major protagonistic secondary characters introduced in that outing, the teacher Katie March – the German series' titular "Frau", or "Woman" – and the former deputy (but now full-fledged) marshal Dusty. Save for Katie March's single flashback memory at the start of the story, Blueberry does not make any kind of further appearance in the two-part mini-series. It is unclear however, if Frei had obtained legal permission from the Charlier and Giraud heirs to proceed with his creation. Still, this was actually the kind of creation that came very close to what Philippe Charlier had in mind nine years earlier as part of the by him envisioned grand, overall Blueberry-franchise.

- 1: Leutnant Blueskull (Moasic-Zack, issues 267, 09/21 - 270, 12/21, Mosaik Steinchen für Steinchen Verlag)
- 2: Der Tod des Leutnants (Moasic-Zack, issues 283, 01/23 - 286, 04/23, Mosaik Steinchen für Steinchen Verlag)

A 120-page hardcover omnibus collection (ISBN 9783949987083) was announced by the publisher for a May 2023 album release under its "Blattgold"-imprint as "Die Ballade der Kate March: Die Frau mit dem Silberstern". Likewise endowed with an elaborate editorial, the omnibus was designed to fit in seamlessly in the Die Blueberry Chroniken format, the aforementioned 2006-2017 German omnibus collection from Egmont, as its volume 20.

However, and even though the publisher itself had reported in an April 3, 2023 posting on their own ZackMagazine facebook page that the publication was ready for release directly after Easter, no such release had after six months been forthcoming after all. It turned out that the publisher had indeed run afoul of legalities with the copyright owners when they confirmed in June on their own monthly editorial news site that it was in effect Philippe Charlier himself who had raised the legal objections, resulting in the publisher withholding the omnibus' release as well as ordering the entire printing to be shredded in order to avoid being taken to court – save for a handful of limited edition copies that were already delivered to customers, who had pre-ordered them directly from the publisher before the ban came into effect and on top of a few regular copies illegally saved by diligent publishing staff (some of which subsequently sold for considerable collector prices on German eBay). The publisher stated that, because licensing issues had been settled with parent publisher Dargaud, the Charlier heirs must have known about the comic and its serialized pre-publication for two years without raising any objections, thereby implying that they had intentionally waited until the album was printed and ready for dissemination, before taking legal steps after all. Right before legal proceedings were initiated, Moasic-Zack had just sold the publication rights to Dutch publisher HUM! for the into that language translated version, slated for a 2024 release.

=== Homage series ===
At the start of the 2010s, French Bande Dessinée publishers introduced a new concept into their release line-ups, that of the homage, or tribute series. Goal of those series was to give (predominantly) younger and less established artists a chance to apply their own spin to classic BD series, either by art, scenario, or both. These one-story works were explicitly intended as one-off projects encompassing at the very most two volumes only, and were most definitely neither intended as a continuation of a series nor as a spin-off series, and required the express permission of the original creators or their heirs. Even though purist fans consider the phenomenon with much reservations, the new concept caught on and several classic series have in the meantime received what the French call "XYZ [vu] par..." (="XYZ [as seen] by...") treatment. One of the first classic series to see outings in the format had been Valérian and Laureline by Giraud's lifelong friend Jean-Claude Mézières.

==== Sfar and Blain ====
In November 2019 Dargaud published a homage book made by the duo Joann Sfar and Christophe Blain, after Isabelle Giraud had unexpectedly given permission to embark on a new Blueberry project for the very first, and as of 2025 only, time since her husband's death. As if to underscore the uniqueness of the occasion, the duo was permitted to create a two-volume album story as Blueberry's first homage release. Their two-volume story deals with a by white settlers incited Apache uprising and is set between the albums "Trail of the Navajo" and "The Man with the Silver Star". The first third-party Blueberry interpretation series was launched with much fanfare and has seen several translations – albeit in far less languages that the three origin series –, to wit in Croatian, Dutch, German, Italian, Brazilian Portuguese, and Spanish.

For undisclosed reasons, the conclusion of the two-volume story was delayed for over half a decade, with all involved having observed a complete information black-out on the matter. It was only in the autumn of 2024 that it was finally revealed that its release was expected for April 2025.

- 1: Amertume Apache (Dargaud, 11/2019, ISBN 9782205077988)

=== Film adaptations ===
A 2004 film adaptation, Blueberry: L'expérience secrète(U.S. release title is Renegade), was directed by Jan Kounen and starred Vincent Cassel in the lead role, with Giraud himself making a walk-on cameo appearance at the beginning of the movie. Only loosely based on "The Lost Dutchman's Mine"-diptych, many purist fans were appalled by this film for its prominent depiction of, and reliance on, Native-American mysticism and shamanism, as already hinted at in the film's subtitle. Giraud though, has expressed pride of Kounen's film in the special features of the 2004 French 2-disc "Edition Collector" DVD, which was not that surprising as it closely chimed with what he had envisioned for his own Fort Mescalero movie, and Blueberry 1900 comic projects. Philippe Charlier on the other hand, was livid when he was presented the final product, and demanded his father's credit removed from the film – which did not happen incidentally, as this under French copy right laws would have also entailed him forfeiting his share of the film royalties he had already received. Kounen himself, unperturbed by Charlier Jr's objections, had stated: "My film is a Blueberry album as though it had been drawn by Mœbius". In regard to the fan criticism he commented that "fans are uncreative and aggressive, they want us to serve them, they are a real plague for a filmmaker".

Three prior attempts to bring Blueberry to the silver screen had fallen through two decades earlier; in 1986 Charlier disclosed how American actor Martin Kove had actually already been signed to play the titular role – with whom Kove shared a remarkable resemblance at the time – for the first two early 1980s attempts, which were both based on the "Confederate Gold" cycle. It was Kove who introduced the two Blueberry creators to would-be American film producers on both occasions. The first attempt failed because American producers intended a complete script rewrite turning Blueberry into a completely unrecognizable standard western. The second attempt suffered even worse as its American producer, "inspired" by the success of the 1981 movie Raiders of the Lost Ark, wanted to turn the project into a Raiders 2.0, set in the Yucatán peninsula, complete with Aztec warriors and pyramids and featuring a daring escape in a zeppelin-type airship. Helped by his background in law, an aghast Charlier instructed Giraud to sabotage the project as much as possible and the Blueberry creators eventually managed to buy back the rights for US$30,000. Kove had even traveled to Europe to shoot some test-footage scenes from the comic series in this role in order to entice potential investors. Convinced that the project was a viable one, Kove has also revealed in 2014 how he, together with the two Blueberry creators, had tried to save it by putting up his own money as well when the project was falling apart due to arguments about funding among European/American would-be producers – to no avail however.

The third (and last) attempt concerned a European only endeavor, which had at one point actually involved Sergio Leone, according to Charlier, and was this time around conceived from the outset as a limited television movie series, a format quite popular in Europe (Mediterranean Europe in particular) in the 1980s, and slated to be produced by the Swiss/French/Belgian production/distribution company Technisonor, more faithfully adhering – than the later 2004 film adaptation – to the main comic series and intended to span the "Iron Horse" through the "Rehabilitation" story cycles. That 1983 attempt petered out without so much as a whimper, most likely due to lack of interest on the part of European investors.

=== Exhibitions ===
After Giraud had returned to France pursuant his extended stay in the United States, generic interest in his work steadily grew and resulted in an increasing number of latter-day exhibitions at museums and conventions, featuring his original art. Due to his international renown as "Mœbius", virtually all of these exhibitions focused on his work as such, even if Blueberry art was included in some of them. Nonetheless, at least four such exhibitions were known to have been Western/Blueberry specific.

- (France) December 1995: «Wanted: Blueberry» exposition at the Arthaud Grenette bookstore, Grenoble, also featuring original Blueberry art by Colin Wilson. Both he and Jean Giraud attended the opening on 1 December, making themselves also available for book signings. Prior to the opening a promotional leaflet was disseminated by the bookstore ("Arthaud BD News", issue 1, November 1995), featuring a three-page interview with Giraud.
- (France) 19 September-9 October 1996: «Jean Giraud Blueberry» exposition at the Stardom Gallery, Paris, for the occasion of the upcoming release of the "Blueberry's" artbook by Stardom – Giraud's own publishing house/art gallery. The below-mentioned 1997 documentary was the registration of events surrounding the release, including the exhibition.
- 15 March-15 April 2005: «JEAN GIRAUD: Exposition de dessins et planches originales de "DUST" le nouvel album de Blueberry aux editions Dargaud», Galerie Arludik, Paris, France; small exhibition for the occasion of the 28th Blueberry album release.
- (Belgium) 15 January-14 June 2009: «Blueberry» exposition at the Maison de la Bande Dessinée, Brussels

=== Documentaries ===
- 1988: (France) Jean-Michel Charlier: "un réacteur sous la plume" – Documentary by Jean-Pierre Delvalle (CNBDI, Angoulême, January, 25 min.). Overview of Charlier's career, with ample attention for Blueberry.
  - French SECAM tape release in 1997 as an outing in the Atelier Multimédia, «Portrait d'Auteur» collection.
- 1994: (France) Blueberry – Documentary by Christophe Heili (Cendranes Films for Canal+/TVCF, October, 27 min.)
- 1997: (France) Jean [Gir]aud's - Documentary by Hervé Eparvier (Stardom, Paris, 22 min.). Documentary produced on the occasion of the September 1996 Blueberry exposition at Stardom Gallery. The documentary title is a play on the title of the "Blueberry's" artbook, slated for release at the time. Pettigrew's 2000 documentary is modeled after the template set in this documentary.
  - French SECAM tape release in 1997, included as bonus for the boxed, limited edition of the artbook "Blueberry's" (ISBN 2908706024)
- 2000: (France) Mister Gir & Mike S. Blueberry – Documentary by Damian Pettigrew, registering two days in the life of Giraud in October 1999, when he visits his atelier with his family, the offices of Paris publisher Dargaud and the Parisian mega-chain store fr:Fnac for the launch of the Blueberry album, "Géronimo l'Apache", and when he travels to Saint Malo for its 1999 comic-book festival, on both occasions executing numerous sketches and watercolors for fans. Throughout the registrations, Giraud comments on his co-creation, and is intercut with additional remarks from Thierry Smolderen, Guy Vidal and Cristian Rossi, commenting on the place of Blueberry in the Franco-Belgian comic world and in (French) culture in general. In the film's last sequence, Giraud does a spontaneous life-size portrait in real time of Geronimo on a large sheet of glass (Musée de la Bande dessinée d'Angoulême, 55 min.)
  - French SECAM tape release in 2000 (OCLC 812528584)
  - French 1-disc DVD release in 2011 (OCLC 887535650), as an augment to Pettigrew's 2010 Métamœbius documentary.
- 2007:Mœbius Redux: A Life in Pictures – Biographical documentary by Hasko Baumann (Germany, England, Finland, Netherlands: Arte, BBC, ZDF, YLE, AVRO, 68 min.) Though most of this documentary is taken up by his work as "Mœbius", ample attention is also given to his Blueberry creation.
  - Non-commercial, but licensed, Australian 1-disc DVD release in 2008 (OCLC 951516758)
  - Commercial German 2-disc DVD release in 2010, extended to 190 min. (OCLC 891515384)

=== Awards and honors ===
The series has received (world) wide recognition in the comics community, and the chief factor for Giraud receiving his first recorded international award in 1972. Listed are only those rewards the author(s) received, where Blueberry was either specifically or partially emphasized as award (nomination) motivation, as Giraud in particular received a plethora of additional awards and nominations for his work as "Mœbius" from 1977 onward, including awards encompassing his entire body of works.

- 1969 & 1970: (France) «La Meilleure Serie d'Aventures» Prix Phénix Paris, for Lieutenant Blueberry.
- 1971: (Belgium) «Best European Artist» Prix Saint-Michel from the city of Brussels, Giraud only.
- 1971: (Belgium) «Best Realistic Writing» Prix Saint-Michel from the city of Brussels for among others Blueberry, Charlier only.
- 1972: (United States) «Best Realistic Artist» Special Award, from the National Cartoonists Society for Lieutenant Blueberry, Giraud only.
- 1973: (United States) «Best Foreign Comic Series» Shazam Award from the Academy of Comic Book Arts for Lieutenant Blueberry: "L'homme qui valait 500 000 $".
- 1973: (France) «Scenario d'Aventures» Prix Phénix, Paris, for among others Blueberry, Charlier only.
- 1975: (Italy) «Best Foreign Artist» Yellow Kid Award from the Lucca Comics & Games convention, Giraud only.
- 1978: (Austria) «Besondere Verdienste um die Comic-Literatur» Goldene Sprechblase Award from the Vereinigung für Comic-Literatur for Leutnant Blueberry, Giraud only.
- 1979: (Sweden) «Best International Comic-Strip [or comic book] Cartoonist»Adamson Award from the Svenska Serieakademien, Giraud only.
- 1985: (France) «Grand Prix National des Arts Graphiques» from the Angoulême International Comics Festival for among others Blueberry, Giraud only; first time this specific prize was awarded and for the occasion presented by French Culture Minister, Jack Lang, in person.
- 1991: (United States) «Best American Edition of Foreign Material» Harvey Award for the Blueberry saga published by Epic.
- 1996: (France) «Best Comic Album» Soleil d'Or from the BD Festival de Solliès-Ville for Blueberry: "Mister Blueberry", Giraud only. (Award statue sculpted by François Boucq, the intended Blueberry 1900 artist)
- 1997: (United States) «Best Archival Collection» Eisner Award nomination for The Blueberry Saga #1: The Confederate Gold published by Mojo Press.
- 2000: (Norway) «Best Translated Strips» Sproing Award from the Norsk Tegneserieforum for Blueberry: "Geronimo", Giraud only.
- 2021: (France) Induction of Charlier in the BD Gest' "Le Panthéon de la BD - Franco-Belge" hall of fame, for among others Blueberry.

While Giraud has garnered universal praise and acclaim for his work as "Mœbius", Blueberry has always remained his most successful and most recognized work in mainland Europe, despite its artist developing somewhat of a love/hate relationship with his co-creation in later life, which was exemplified by him regularly taking an extended leave of absence from his co-creation. That Blueberry has always remained his primary source of income, allowing him to fully indulge in his artistic endeavors as Moebius, was admitted as such by Giraud as early as 1979: "If an album of Moebius is released, about 10.000 people are interested. A Blueberry album sells at least 100.000 copies [in France]", and as late as 2005, "Blueberry is in some ways the "sponsor" of Moebius, for years now".

== Sources ==
- de Bree, Kees; Frederiks, Hans (1982). Stripschrift special 4: Blueberry, Arzach, Majoor Fataal, John Difool, de kleurrijke helden van Giraud/Moebius (in Dutch). Zeist: Vonk. p. 100. OCLC 63463307.
- Hjorth-Jørgensen, Anders (1984). Giraud/Moebius – og Blueberrys lange march (in Danish). Odense: Stavnsager. p. 64. ISBN 8788455262.
- Collective (November 1986). L'univers de 1: Gir (in French). Paris: Dargaud. p. 96. ISBN 2205029452.
- Ernst, Dominique (January 1987). "Dossier Wilson: Entretien avec Colin Wilson et Janet Gale". Bonté Divine! (in French). No. 8. Thônex: Dominique Ernst. pp. 5–25.
- Sadoul, Numa (January 1991). Mœbius: Entretiens avec Numa Sadoul (in French). Tournai: Casterman. p. 198. ISBN 2203380152.
- Sadoul, Numa; Rebiersch, Resel (1992). Das grosse Moebius Buch (in German) (German language version of the 1991 Casterman ed.). Hamburg: Carlsen Verlag GmbH. p. 200. ISBN 3551019002.
- Ledoux, Alain; Maltret, Olivier (6 November 1993). "Gir-Moebius". Sapristi! (in French) (27). Dieppe: Association Normande de Bande Dessinée (ANBD): 86.; theme issue
- Pizzoli, Daniel (1995). Il était une fois Blueberry (in French). Paris: Dargaud. p. 96. ISBN 2205044788.
- Pizzoli, Daniel (1997). Ein Yankee namens Blueberry (in German) (German language version of the 1995 Dargaud ed.). Stuttgart: Ehapa. p. 96. ISBN 3770405587.
- Svane, Erik; Surmann, Martin; Ledoux, Alain; Jurgeit, Martin; Berner, Horst; Förster, Gerhard (2003). Zack-Dossier 1: Blueberry und der europäische Western-Comic (in German). Berlin: Mosaik. p. 96. ISBN 393266759X.; the vast majority of the featured artist's interviews, conducted by Svane, was originally published in French in the Swiss comics journal Swof, Hors-Séries (Moebius-themed) issue 2, 2000/Q1, but were updated and augmented with material edited out in the original publication, as well as enhanced with material from other, older source publications, especially opportune in the latter case for the by then deceased Jean-Michel Charlier.
- Bosser, Frédéric (June 2005). "Jan Kounen: Du Colt 45 au 35 mm" & "Dossier Jean Giraud: Cavalier solitaire". Les dossiers de la bande dessinée (in French). No. 27. Paris: DBD. pp. 52–94.
- de la Croix, Arnaud (2007). Blueberry : une légende de l'Ouest (in French). Brussels: Edition Point Image. p. 100. ISBN 9782930460086.
- Ratier, Gilles [in French] (November 2013). Jean-Michel CHARLIER vous raconte... (in French). Bègles: Les Castor Astral. p. 320. ISBN 9782859209346.; biography
- Sadoul, Numa (October 2015). Docteur Mœbius et Mister Gir: Entretiens avec Jean Giraud (in French) (Updated, expanded and revised version of the 1991 Casterman ed.). Tournai: Casterman. p. 264. ISBN 9782203041639.
- Sadoul, Numa; Gauvin (tr.), Edward (13 December 2023). Doctor Moebius and Mister Gir (English language version of the 2015 Casterman ed.). Milwaukie, Oregon, USA: Dark Horse Books. p. 288. ISBN 9781506713434.
- Vivier, Jean-François; Blanc-Dumont, Michel (November 2025). Michel BLANC-DUMONT Rétrospective (in French). Monaco: Éditions Rocher – Plein Vert. p. 256. ISBN 9782384881321.
