= When the World Shook =

1919 novel by Henry Rider Haggard

- First edition (UK)
- Author: H. Rider Haggard
- Language: English
- Genre: Lost World
- Publisher: Cassell (UK); Longman, Green (US)
- Publication date: 1919
- Publication place: United Kingdom
- Pages: 338
- Preceded by: Moon of Israel
- Followed by: The Ancient Allan

When the World Shook is a novel by British writer H. Rider Haggard, published in 1919. It deals with the adventures of Bastin, Bickley, and Arbuthnot as they travel to the south sea island of Orofena.

== Plot summary ==
The story begins as the main character, Humphrey Arbuthnot—a writer of adventure stories—is married to his wife Natalie. Shortly thereafter, she claims that she is going to die soon even though she has been given a clean bill of health from their doctor, Bickley. Right as Natalie dies, she tells Arbuthnot that soon he will want to travel somewhere, and that is where the two shall meet again.

Natalie dies, and shortly thereafter Arbuthnot has a sudden urge to travel to the Pacific islands. He gets on a yacht with two friends, Bickley, a doctor, Bastin, a minister, and Arbuthnot's dog, Tommy. The craft is then taken by a cyclone after all the crew abandons ship. When the three adventurers awaken, they find themselves shipwrecked on the South Sea island of Orofena.

Here they meet the Orofenan people who worship a God called Oro. The men win the love of the Orofenans as Bickley teaches the men western medicine techniques and saves a few lives. They are told not to go to a part of the island named Orofena which is a volcano. After a dispute in which Bickley destroys a symbol of Oro and kills one of the natives who was about to be sacrificed.

They flee to a small volcanic island in the center of a lake at the center of the island of Orofena. The men search a cave in the side of the volcano and find two crystal coffins with two people in them. First they revive an old man who is the original Oro. Next they revive his daughter Yva.

After being revived, Oro makes astronomical observations to confirm by stellar movements that he and his daughter have been unconscious for 250,000 years. Yva claims they know the position of the stars as they came from a society that was filled with wisdom known as the age of wisdom. To describe what the age of wisdom was like, Yva conjures up scenes from the age of wisdom by showing the men a hallucination of the past.

As the men are talking about the modern age and learning about the age of wisdom, each of the men attempts to court Yva. It is revealed that Yva will only marry a man from her own era who was killed by her father. She intimates to Arbuthnot that she has the soul of Natalie inside her, and that he is a reincarnation of her lost love. She falls in love with Arbuthnot, and they decide to be married.

Using a form of remote viewing or astral projection, Oro forces Arbuthnot to show him the current state of the world, including events taking place in England and France (where World War I is ongoing). After forming a negative view of humanity in this era based on these events, he decides to destroy half the world so that he may rule the surviving remainder of humanity and create a new golden age. He prepares a ritual which will make an earthquake that will destroy the whole world.

Yva sacrifices herself to prevent Oro's plan, thus saving millions of human beings from death. Brokenhearted, Oro allows the men to escape the island, and eventually they return home to England.

Once home, they wonder if Oro was telling the truth the whole time or if he was a madman. The story ends after Humphery Arbuthnot, along with Tommy, dies, and they are buried next to Natalie.

== Reception ==
David Pringle gave When the World Shook two stars out of four. He also described the novel as "a sunken world yarn which is also a far-fetched love story."

== See also ==
- 'Oro, the Tahitian god of war
- Orohena (Orofena), the highest mountain in Tahiti
- Out of the Silence by Erle Cox
- The Ice People by René Barjavel
