= Une rose au paradis =

1981 science fiction novel by René Barjavel

First edition (publ. Presses de la Cité)

Une rose au paradis is a science-fiction novel written by René Barjavel, and first published in 1981.

Buried far beneath what used to be Paris, the last members of the human race live in an automated shelter. They are Mr. and Mrs. Jonas, their twin teenage children Jim and Jil, and Mr. Gé, who is directly responsible for setting the bombs that entirely destroyed the surface of the planet and at the same time for saving the Jonas family, whom he hopes will repopulate the world once it is safe to go out. But innocent games lead the twins to unwittingly start the repopulation right then and there, putting in jeopardy the delicate air exchanges balance of the shelter. There are now too many people in the shelter, and Mrs. Jonas' family instincts activate - she pushes Mr Gé into 'the hole', where everything from food remains to clothes are processed and recycled. Doing so, she accelerates the events so that soon there is only one choice left - die in the shelter, or try to reach the surface and hope the lethal radiations of the bombs have faded.

Another exploration of the themes of global destruction / salvation of a few number of people in a buried shelter as seen in La Nuit des temps and Le diable l'emporte. Also, return of Mr. Gé, who was the same kind of all-powerful, ultra-rich visionary in Le diable l'emporte.

First published in 1981 by Les Presses de la Cité.
