= Shutter Island (disambiguation) =

Shutter Island is a 2003 novel by Dennis Lehane.

Shutter Island may also refer to:

- Shutter Island (graphic novel), a 2009 graphic novel based on Lehane's novel, adapted by Christian de Metter.
- Shutter Island (film), a 2010 film based on Lehane's novel, directed by Martin Scorsese and starring Leonardo DiCaprio.
