= La Nuit des temps (comic book) =

2021 comic book by Christian De Metter

- Page count: 184 pages
- Publisher: Éditions Phileas

Creative team
- Writer: Christian De Metter, after René Barjavel
- Artist: Christian De Metter

Original publication
- Date of publication: 10 November 2021
- Language: French
- ISBN: 9782491467135

La Nuit des temps is a 2021 French comic book by Christian De Metter.

== Background ==
La Nuit des temps is based on the 1968 novel The Ice People by René Barjavel. Christian De Metter first read The Ice People when he was young and it made him explore more works by Barjavel. For the adaptation, he replaced the original story's Cold War theme with one of ecological disaster, thereby transforming it from pacifist fiction to climate-change fiction.

== Plot ==
An international expedition to Antarctica discovers the remnants of a pre-historical civilization with two survivors, a man and a woman, who are kept in suspended animation through advanced technology.

== Publication ==
The comic book was published by Philéas on 10 November 2021.

== Reception ==
Auxence Delion of ActuaBD wrote that it is a daring task to adapt The Ice People, because it is one of the most celebrated works of French science fiction. Delion wrote that the comic book retains much of the novel's suggestive power, despite having been shortened and despite that the French scientist Simon—from whose perspective the story is told in the novel—has been reduced to a minor character.
