= J. K. Raymond-Millet =

J.K. Raymond-Millet
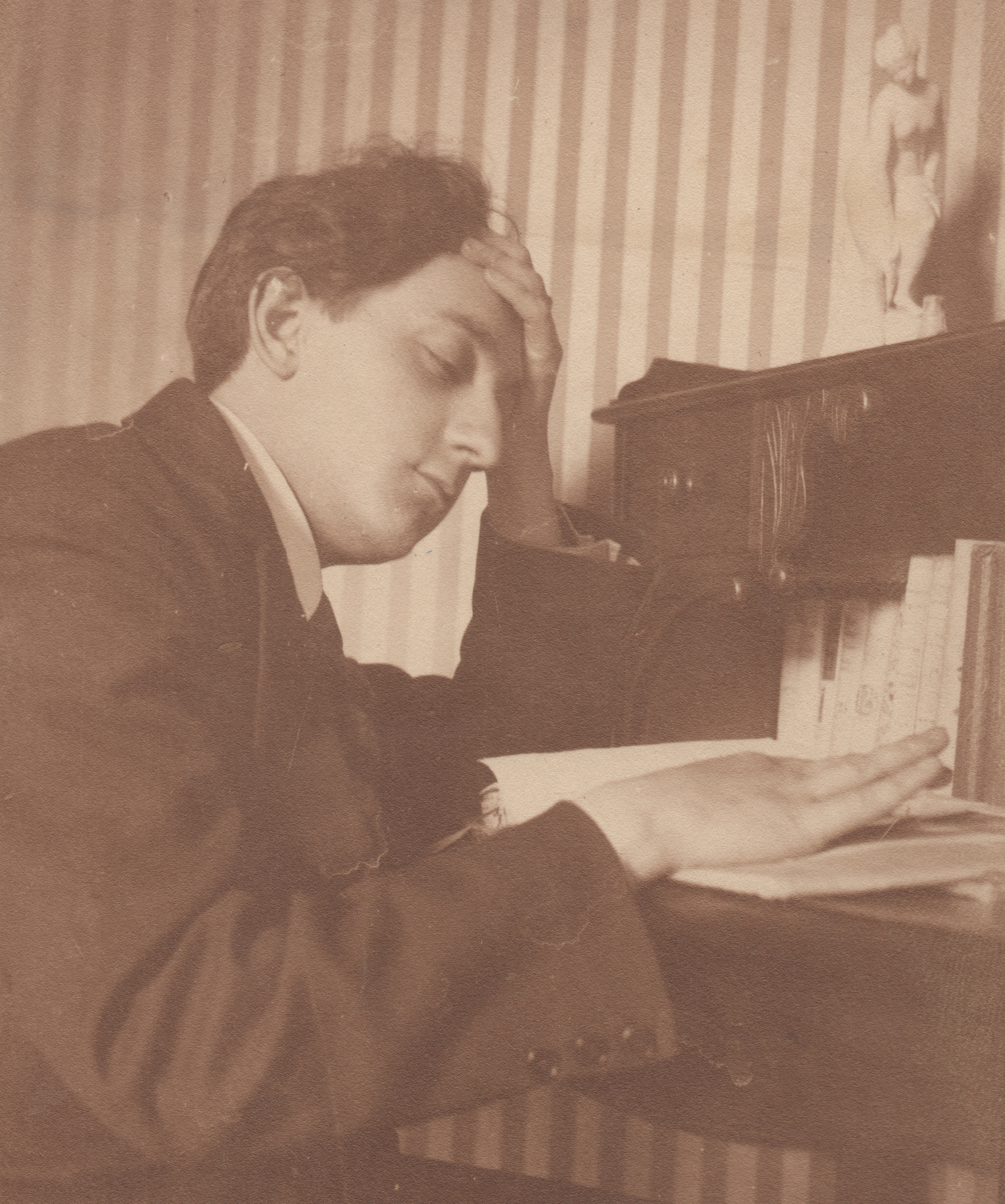
- Born: 12 September 1902; Toulouse, France
- Died: 15 August 1974 (aged 71); Beauvais, France
- Occupations: Film director, journalist

J.K. Raymond-Millet (12 September 1902 – 15 August 1974) was a French film director and journalist.

== Biography ==
J.K. Raymond-Millet was a documentary filmmaker and the creator of Les Films J.K. Raymond-Millet. On 29 September 1923, he married Marcelle Robert, alias Monique Muntcho in Paris. Together with Robert, he produced various films under different film production banners: Les Films de la Colombe, Les Films J.K.Raymond-Millet. He also authored poetry and travelogues.

He produced several documentaries in the Interwar period, notably Aude, belle inconnue under the Vichy regime, and continued his career after the Second World War.

In 1947, he produced and directed Télévision, oeil de demain which predicted smartphones and video calling. The film was based on a premise from the science fiction author René Barjavel.

== Filmography ==
- 1925 : Géants d'acier, pieuvres mécaniques
- 1926 : L'Industrie vinicole en Oranie
- 1929 : Promenade en Afrique équatoriale française
- 1930 : France-Congo sur un cargo
- 1932 : À la rencontre du soleil
- 1934 : Le Manioc
- 1935 : La Chanson du Manioc
- 1935 : L'Ile de la Réunion
- 1936 : Concert Caraïbe
- 1937 : Au pays du vrai rhum
- 1937 : Aude, belle inconnue
- 1937 : Occitanie
- 1939 : L'Albigeois
- 1940 : La Haute-Vallée de la Garonne
- 1940 : Terres vermeilles
- 1943 : L'Ariège, rivière de France
- 1943 : Gens et coutumes d'Armagnac
- 1944 : Au Pays du Magnan
- 1944 : Le Chemin de Madagascar
- 1944 : Terres créoles
- 1944 : Voyage mauve
- 1945 : L'Ennemi secret
- 1945 : Les Heures passent
- 1945 : Naissance d'un spectacle
- 1945 : La Vallée du Têt
- 1947 : Divertissement espagnol
- 1947 : La Télévision, œil de demain
- 1948 : Il était une montagne
- 1948 : La Source du sourire
- 1949 : Minarets dans le soleil
- 1949 : Sedan
- 1951 : Cheveux noirs, capes grises
- 1951 : La Grande île au coeur des Saintes-Eaux
- 1951 : Réalités malgaches
- 1951 : Terre du sucre et du rhum
- 1952 : Pêcheurs et pescadous
- 1952 : Sud
- 1953 : Nommé à Majunga
- 1953 : Plein ciel malgache
- 1953 : Tamatave la Marine
- 1954 : Modern Magascar
- 1958 : Vertiges
- 1958 : Un Village d'Algérie
- 1960 : La Démographie Algérienne
- 1960 : L'Economie Algérienne
- 1964 : La Jeunesse de Monsieur Pasteur
- 1967 : Chronique du païs du Tarn
- 1972 : Paris d'une fenêtre
