= The Pleasure Pit =

- Directed by: André Cayatte
- Written by: René Barjavel; André Cayatte
- Starring: Renaud Verley; Jane Birkin; Elsa Martinelli
- Cinematography: Andréas Winding
- Music by: Serge Gainsbourg
- Release date: 1969
- Language: French

The Pleasure Pit (French: Les Chemins de Katmandou, Italian: Katmandu, also known as Dirty Dolls in Kathmandu, The Road to Katmandu and Ways of Katmandu) is a 1969 French-Italian crime-drama film written and directed by André Cayatte. The screenplay for the film was written by René Barjavel, who later adapted it into a novel titled Les Chemins de Katmandou.

== Cast ==
- Renaud Verley : Olivier
- Jane Birkin : Jane
- Elsa Martinelli : Martine
- Serge Gainsbourg : Ted
- Pascale Audret : Yvonne
- Arlene Dahl : Laureen
- Gilberte Géniat
- Mike Marshall
- Marc Michel
- David O'Brien
- Sacha Pitoëff
