= Valerian and the City of a Thousand Planets =

2017 film by Luc Besson

- Theatrical release poster
- French: Valérian et la Cité des mille planètes
- Directed by: Luc Besson
- Screenplay by: Luc Besson
- Based on: Valérian and Laureline by: Pierre Christin; Jean-Claude Mézières
- Produced by: Virginie Besson-Silla
- Starring: Dane DeHaan; Cara Delevingne; Clive Owen; Rihanna; Ethan Hawke; Herbie Hancock; Kris Wu; Rutger Hauer
- Cinematography: Thierry Arbogast
- Edited by: Julien Rey
- Music by: Alexandre Desplat
- Production companies: EuropaCorp; Fundamental Films; TF1 Films Production; Orange Studio; Novo Pictures; Universum Film; River Road Entertainment; Belga Films Fund; OCS; TF1; BNP Paribas; Valerian S.A.S.
- Distributed by: EuropaCorp. Distribution (France); STXfilms (United States); China Film Group Corporation (China); Buena Vista International (Germany); Belga Films (Belgium); Gulf Film (United Arab Emirates)
- Release dates: 17 July 2017 (Grauman's Chinese Theatre); 20 July 2017 (Germany); 21 July 2017 (United States); 26 July 2017 (France); 25 August 2017 (China); 26 August 2017 (Belgium)
- Running time: 137 minutes
- Countries: France; United States; China; Germany; Belgium; United Arab Emirates
- Language: English
- Budget: €197 million (gross) (~$209 million); $177–205 million (net)
- Box office: $226 million

Valerian and the City of a Thousand Planets (French: Valérian et la Cité des mille planètes) is a 2017 space opera film written and directed by Luc Besson, and produced by his wife, Virginie Besson-Silla. It is based on the French science fiction comics series Valérian and Laureline, written by Pierre Christin, illustrated by Jean-Claude Mézières, and published by Dargaud. It stars Dane DeHaan and Cara Delevingne as Valerian and Laureline, respectively, with Clive Owen, Rihanna, Ethan Hawke, Herbie Hancock, Kris Wu and Rutger Hauer in supporting roles. Besson independently financed and personally funded the film. With a production budget of around $180 million, it is both the most expensive European and the most expensive independent film ever made. The film is a large international co-production between France, the United States, China, Germany, Belgium, and the United Arab Emirates.

In the film, two operatives of the United Human Federation are on a mission to Alpha, a city inhabited by thousands of species from different planets. Their latest mission is to uncover a destructive force beneath the sprawling city, realizing it threatens not just Alpha, but the entire universe.

Valerian and the City of a Thousand Planets was released on 20 July 2017 in Germany by Walt Disney Studios Motion Pictures under the Buena Vista International imprint, in the United States on 21 July by STXfilms, in France on 26 July by EuropaCorp Distribution, in China on 25 August by China Film Group, in Belgium on 26 August by Belga Films, and 27 November in the United Arab Emirates by Gulf Film. It received mixed reviews from critics, who criticised the plot and some of the casting, but praised the visuals. It grossed $226 million worldwide, but due to its high production and advertising costs, was considered a box-office bomb following its release in the United States.

== Plot ==
In the 28th century, cooperation between the Earth and extraterrestrial species has expanded the former International Space Station to the point its mass threatens gravitational disruption to Earth. Relocated to deep space, it becomes Alpha, a space-traveling city inhabited by 3,236 species from hundreds of planets. Valerian and Laureline are partners in the United Human Federation police.

Valerian has a dream of the planet Mül, where a low-tech humanoid race fishes for pearls containing energy, which is converted by a small animal for use. A huge spacecraft crashes into the planet, causing an extinction event. The planet's princess, Lihö-Minaa, is stranded outside, but before she dies, she conveys an energy wave containing a telepathic message.

Valerian and Laureline are on a mission to retrieve the last Mül converter animal, which is in the hands of black market dealer Igon Siruss. In a marketplace on planet Kirian in an alternate dimension, Valerian disrupts a meeting between Igon and two hooded figures similar to the humanoids from his dream. They, too, seek the converter. Valerian and Laureline recover the converter, and Valerian steals an energy pearl. They learn that Mül was destroyed 30 years earlier, and information about it is classified.

Onboard Alpha, commander Arün Filitt informs them that the center of the station has been irradiated by an unknown force, rendering it highly toxic. Troops sent into the area have not returned and the radiation levels are increasing. Laureline and Valerian are assigned to protect the commander during an interstation summit on the crisis; against the commander's wishes, Laureline maintains possession of the converter.

During the summit, Mül humanoids attack and kidnap Filitt. Valerian chases the kidnappers to the irradiated area but crashes his spaceplane. Laureline enlists alien information brokers to find Valerian at the edge of the irradiated zone. She is kidnapped by a primitive tribe and presented as the choice course at their emperor's dinner. Valerian infiltrates the tribe's territory with the help of a shape-shifter named Bubble. Laureline and Valerian escape, but Bubble is fatally wounded. Valerian and Laureline venture into the irradiated area, discovering it is not dangerous and contains an antique spacecraft. They find the humanoids, the Pearls, with an unconscious Filitt.

Pearl Emperor Haban Limaï explains that his people lived peacefully on Mül until a battle occurred on their world between the Federation and a hostile alien race. The human commander Filitt ordered the use of fusion missiles to destroy the enemy mothership, but inadvertently resulted in Mül's destruction. Upon her death, Princess Lihö-Minaa transferred her soul into Valerian's body. Haban and some of Mül's inhabitants survive in a previously crashed vessel. Trapped in the spaceship, the surviving Pearls repaired it and learned human technology and history. Scrap ships took them to Alpha, where they assimilated knowledge from different species and built their own ship. They need the converter and pearl to launch it, so they can find a new home.

Filitt admits his role in the genocide but argues it was necessary to end the war and cover it up to prevent humans from losing credibility and influence in Alpha. Valerian and Laureline argue that the commander is trying to avoid the consequences of his actions. When Filitt becomes belligerent, Valerian knocks him out.

Valerian hands over the pearl he took from Igon, and Laureline persuades him to return the converter. While the Pearls prepare their spacecraft for takeoff, Filitt's K-Tron robot soldiers attack them, but Valerian and the surviving government soldiers defeat the robots. The spacecraft departs, and Filitt is arrested.

Valerian and Laureline are left adrift aboard an old space ship, where she answers his marriage proposal with a "maybe" as they await rescue.

=== Source ===
Although the overall plot does not follow any specific volume of the original Valérian and Laureline graphic novels, much of the action of the film was adapted from the seventh volume, L'Ambassadeur des Ombres ("Ambassador of the Shadows"). in which Laureline searches through the enormous space station Point Central (called "Alpha" in the film), a meeting point of thousands of alien species with multiple different environments, to rescue Valérian, who is lost somewhere in the space station while chasing after the kidnappers of an ambassador who has been abducted by an unknown species. The title of the film echoes the title of the volume "Empire of a Thousand Planets," but does not follow the plot.

== Cast ==
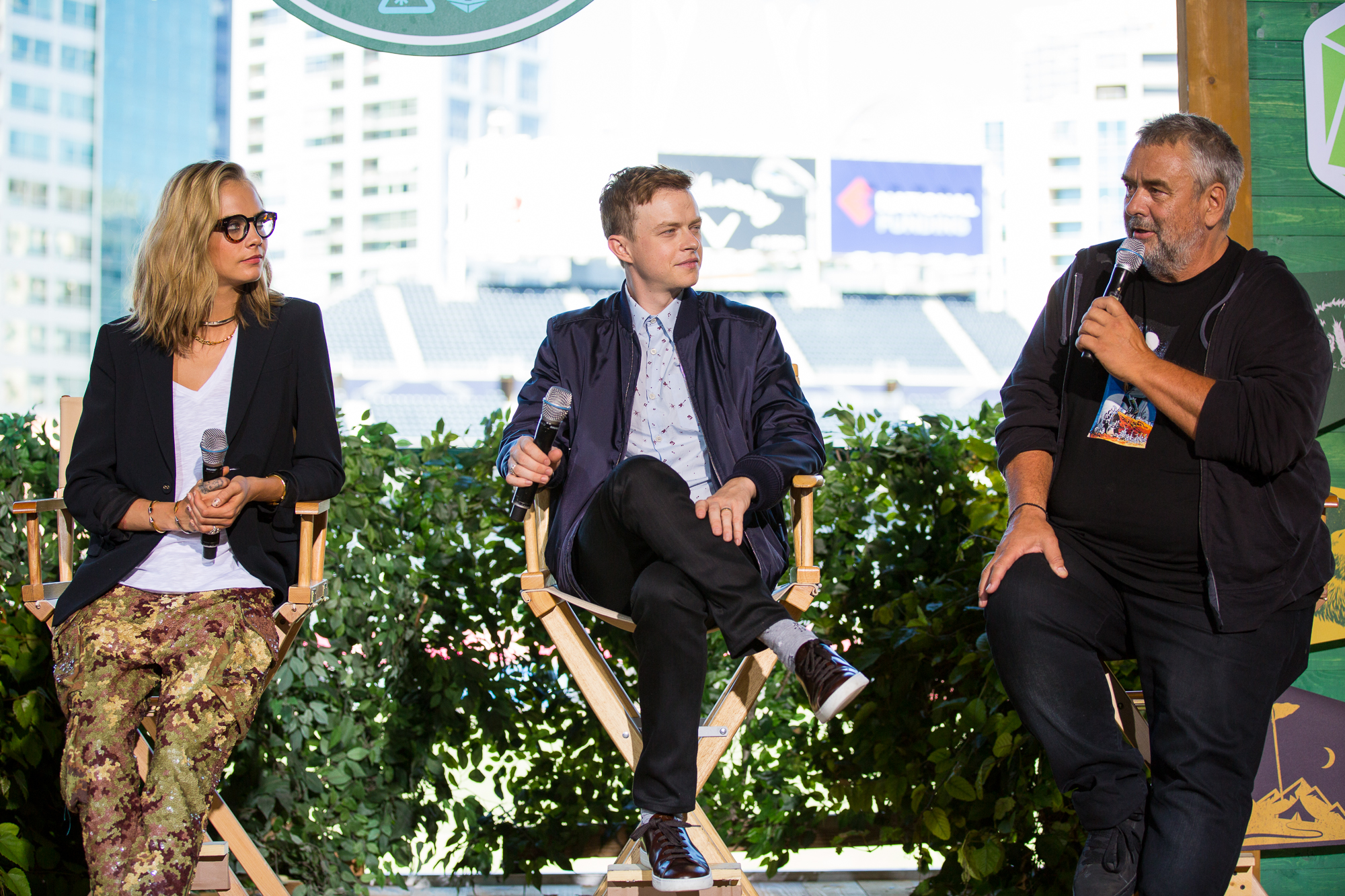
Delevingne, DeHaan, and Besson were at the 2016 San Diego Comic-Con presentation of Valerian and the City of a Thousand Planets at Camp Conival.

- Dane DeHaan as Valerian, a United Human Federation soldier and Laureline's partner/love interest
- Cara Delevingne as Laureline, a United Human Federation soldier and Valerian's partner/love interest
- Clive Owen as Arün Filitt, Valerian and Laureline's commander
- Rihanna as the human form of Bubble, a shapeshifting Glamopod entertainer.
- Ethan Hawke as Jolly the Pimp, Bubble's "protector".
- Herbie Hancock as Defence Minister
- Kris Wu as Sergeant Neza
- Rutger Hauer as The President of the World State Federation
- John Goodman as Igon Siruss (voice), a Kodar'Khan pirate captain and the galaxy's most-wanted criminal
- Elizabeth Debicki as Emperor Haban Limaï (voice)
- Sasha Luss as Princess Lihö-Minaa (also credited as Creature "Candy Dress" in Paradise Alley)
- Sam Spruell as General Okto Bar
- Ola Rapace as Major Gibson
- Alain Chabat as Bob the Pirate
- Thom Findlay as The Pirates (voice)
- Mathieu Kassovitz as Camelot on Big Market
- Jonas Bloquet as K-Tron Warrior/Control Room Soldier
- Sand Van Roy as Jessica Rabbit Creature
- Louis Leterrier as Captain Welcoming Mercurys
- Olivier Megaton as Captain Welcoming KCO2
- Gavin Drea as Sergeant Cooper
- Eric Lampaert as Guide Thaziit, a human guiding tourists in the Big Market
- Claire Tran as Control room Sergeant
- Pauline Hoarau as Empress Aloi
- Frédéric Chau as Sergeant Neza

== Production ==
=== Development ===
Although Luc Besson loved the Valerian comics while growing up, he did not seriously consider adapting them into a movie until he was working on The Fifth Element. During development, Besson had hired Valerian illustrator Jean-Claude Mézières to work on the film, who asked Besson, "Why are you doing this shitty film? Why you don't do Valerian?" At the time, Besson felt that making the film was "impossible" given the vast alien-to-human ratio. The release of Avatar served as both a blessing and a curse for Besson; he has said, "technically, I could see that we can do everything now. The film proved that imagination is the only limit." However, he also felt that "James Cameron pushed all the levels so high", which made him believe that his script was not good enough, so he rewrote it. Ultimately, the storyboarding for the film took seven months.

The project was first publicly reported in 2012. The two principal stars, Dane DeHaan and Cara Delevingne, were announced in May 2015. On 19 August 2015, Clive Owen signed on to play Commander Arün Filitt in the film. The budget, €197 million, is by far the largest ever assembled for a French film. Previously, Asterix at the Olympic Games was the most expensive, at €78 million, just ahead of Besson's The Fifth Element (€75 million). By the end of August 2015, Besson said in an RTL radio interview that shooting the film in France was too expensive. Because it was filmed in a foreign language (English), Besson was unable to benefit from tax credits, despite preferring to produce the film in France and create jobs for 1,200 crew members. The criteria to obtain these tax credits were then adapted accordingly. In May 2015, it was announced Fundamental Films would invest US$50 million in the film.

=== Filming ===
Principal photography on the film began on 5 January 2016 in seven sound stages dedicated to the film at the Cité du Cinéma, in Saint-Denis, north of Paris. In total, there are 2,734 visual effect shots. The humanoid race the Pearls were completely synthetic creations by Weta Digital, which generated the characters from performances by actors with motion-capture equipment for their faces and bodies.

=== Marketing ===
The trailer featured the Beatles song "Because", which was the first time a Beatles master recording had been featured in a film advertisement.

=== Visual effects ===
Industrial Light and Magic, Weta Digital and Rodeo FX provided the effects for the film with Scott Stokdyk as the main supervisor.

== Release ==
The first teaser for Valerian was released on 10 November 2016. The teaser depicts Marmakas, an Entertainer (Bubble, identified as "Glamopod" in the film), Bagoulins, and Shingouz (known as "Doghan Daguis" in the film), who all appear in the comic book Ambassador of the Shadows; much of the film's setting and story is also derived from that instalment. A special exclusive preview of Valerian was shown prior to the Fathom Events 4K restoration showing of The Fifth Element on 14 May and 17 May.

Valerian was released in Israel on 20 July 2017, on 21 July in the United States, on 26 July in France. and on 2 August in the UK Lionsgate handles the film's release in the United Kingdom and Ireland, and STX Entertainment distributes the film in the United States. The film was released on 25 August 2017 in China.

=== Home media ===
Valerian and the City of a Thousand Planets was released online on 7 November 2017, and on Ultra HD Blu-ray, Blu-ray and DVD on 21 November 2017.

=== Theme park attraction ===
In 2018, Europa-Park added VR to its roller coaster, Eurosat - CanCan Coaster themed around Valerian as part of the roller coaster's refurbishment before it closed in 2024 and reopened as a Phantom of the Opera-themed experience that same year.

== Soundtrack ==
The official soundtrack for Valerian was released on 21 July 2017 on vinyl, CD, and download. The total duration of this soundtrack album is exactly the same number of minutes as the duration of the film itself — 137 minutes.

Valerian and the City of a Thousand Planets Film Score

Film score by Alexandre Desplat
- Released: 21 July 2017
- Genres: Pop, Rock, Film Score
- Length: 137:08
- Label: Valerian S.A.S.
- Producer: Xavier Forcioli

Alexandre Desplat chronology
American Pastoral (2016)	Valerian and the City of a Thousand Planets Film Score (2017)	The Shape of Water (2017)

Singles from Valerian
- 1. "A Million on My Soul" Released: 24 May 2017; 2. "I Feel Everything" Released: 20 July 2017; 3. "Bubble Dance" Released: 12 August 2017; 4. "Rappcats" Released: 24 February 2018

=== Track listing ===
No.	Title	Artist(s)	Length
1.	"Big Market" (written by Luc Besson)	Alexandre Desplat	2:05
2.	"Space Oddity"	David Bowie	5:18
3.	"I Feel Everything"	Cara Delevingne	3:02
4.	"Jamming"	Bob Marley	3:19
5.	"Bus Attack"	Alexandre Desplat	3:08
6.	"We Trying to Stay Alive"	Wyclef Jean featuring Pras & John Forté	3:13
7.	"Arriving on Alpha"	Alexandre Desplat	2:06
8.	"A Million on My Soul (Radio Edit)"	Alexiane	2:59
9.	"Rappcats (Instrumental)"	Quasimoto	2:02
10.	"Bubble Dance"	Julien Rey	2:25
11.	"Spaceship Chase"	Alexandre Desplat	3:33
12.	"The World (Is Going up in Flames)"	Charles Bradley	3:22
13.	"A Million on My Soul"	Alexiane	4:07
14.	"Medusa"	Alexandre Desplat	1:59
15.	"Pearls on Mul"	Alexandre Desplat	7:36
16.	"Reading the Memo"	Alexandre Desplat featuring Trug	1:23
17.	"Flight Above the Big Market"	Alexandre Desplat	2:44
18.	"Showtime"	Alexandre Desplat	2:38
19.	"Valerian in Trouble"	Alexandre Desplat	1:38
20.	"Pearls Attack"	Alexandre Desplat	4:05
21.	"Valerian's Armor"	Alexandre Desplat	2:09
22.	"Submarine"	Alexandre Desplat	3:00
23.	"Shoot"		1:35
24.	"Fishing for Butterflies"		1:58
25.	"Le souper du Roi"		1:59
26.	"Boulanbator Combat"		3:02
27.	"Bubble"		2:32
28.	"Pearl's World"		6:24
29.	"The City of 1000 Planets"		3:50
30.	"I Am a Soldier"		2:04
31.	"Pearls Power"		1:49
32.	"Final Combat"		7:06

== Reception ==
=== Box office ===
Valerian and the City of a Thousand Planets grossed $40.5 million in the United States and Canada and $184.7 million internationally (including $41.2 million in France), for a worldwide total of $226 million. With a production budget around $180 million, the film would have needed to gross $400 million worldwide in order to break even and justify a sequel.

In North America, Valerian opened alongside Dunkirk and Girls Trip, and was initially projected to gross $20–25 million from 3,553 theaters, although some insiders believed it would open in the teens. It made $6.5 million on its first day, including $1.7 million from Thursday night previews at 2,600 theaters, lowering weekend projections to $16.5 million. The film ended up debuting to $17 million, finishing 5th at the box office, leading Deadline Hollywood to already label the film a domestic box office bomb, and causing an 8.31% fall of the EuropaCorp stock on the following Monday. In its second weekend, the film dropped 62% to $6.4 million, finishing 8th at the box office. In its third and fourth weekends the film made $2.4 million and $901,323, finishing 12th and 17th and dropping another 62% both times.

Outside North America, the film opened in 16 markets alongside the US and made $6.5 million over its opening weekend, including $2.5 million in Germany. In France, the film made $3.72 million (€3.19 million) on its first day, the second-best opening day of 2017 there behind Despicable Me 3. In China, the film made $9.9 million on its first day from 78,000 screens, becoming the first film to displace Wolf Warrior 2 at the country's box office. It went on to open to $29 million, topping the box office. The largest territory for the film was China, with US$62.1 million.

=== Critical response ===
Valerian and the City of a Thousand Planets received mixed reviews from critics, who praised its visuals while criticizing the plot and some of the casting. On review aggregation website Rotten Tomatoes, the film has an approval rating of 48% based on 300 reviews, with an average rating of 5.50/10. The site's critical consensus reads, "Valerian and the City of a Thousand Planets uses sheer kinetic energy and visual thrills to overcome narrative obstacles and offer a viewing experience whose surreal pleasures often outweigh its flaws." On Metacritic, which assigns a weighted average rating to reviews, the film has a score of 51 out of 100, based on reviews from 45 critics, indicating "mixed or average reviews". On French entertainment information website AlloCiné, the film has an average grade of 3.0/5, based on 31 critics. Audiences polled by CinemaScore gave the film an average grade of "B−" on an A+ to F scale.

David Ehrlich of IndieWire gave the film a grade of B−, praising how "unapologetically idiosyncratic" the film is, while also saying "the vividness of this place only underscores the lifelessness of the people leading us through it .... There are 394 million stories on the City of a Thousand Planets, and Valerian's might be the only one we've seen before. Still, any excuse to visit this place is one worth taking." Peter Sciretta of /Film touted the first half of Valerian as "unpredictable and bonkers insane", while calling the second half more formulaic and "far less exciting", though he still encouraged seeing the film in 3D "on the biggest screen possible". Ignatiy Vishnevetsky of The A.V. Club wrote that it was "rare […] to see a film this extravagant that also feels, for better or worse, like the work of a single personality. The longer action scenes may not always rank with Besson's early '90s highlights [...] or the mania of the more recent Lucy, but there isn't a moment in this ludicrous, lushly self-indulgent movie that doesn't feel like its creator is having the time of his life."

Todd McCarthy of The Hollywood Reporter gave a negative review, saying: "The Razzies don't need to wait until the end of the year to anoint a winner for 2017 ... Hollywood studio chiefs can breathe easy that, this time, at least, they'll escape blame for making a giant summer franchise picture that nobody wants to see, since this one's a French import." A. O. Scott of The New York Times was also less than happy with the film, writing the effort "feels as if it were made up on the spot, by someone so delighted by the gaudy genre packaging at his disposal that he lost track of what was supposed to be inside." National Public Radio film critic, Mark Jenkins, wrote in a negative review that the film's "perspective often seems more 19th- than 26th-century, notably in a sequence where Laureline is captured by members of a hostile species and forced to don a white dress to be presented to their emperor. The blobby computer-generated creatures resemble natives from the most racist of Tarzan movies."

=== Accolades ===
At the 44th Saturn Awards, Valerian and the City of a Thousand Planets was nominated for the Saturn Awards for Best Science Fiction Film, Best Production Design (Hugues Tissandier), and Best Costume Design (Olivier Bériot); all respectively lost to Blade Runner 2049 (2017), Black Panther (2018, Hannah Beachler), and Beauty and the Beast (2017, Jacqueline Durran).

== Potential sequel ==
Though the film was a box office flop, director Luc Besson claimed in September 2017 that a sequel was still possible due to positive fan reaction.

== See also ==
- List of films featuring space stations
