= Jean-Claude Mézières =

French comics artist and illustrator (1938–2022)

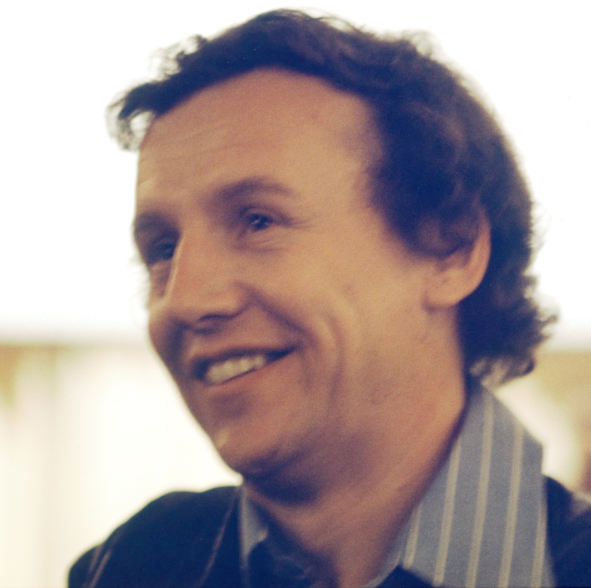
- Mézières in 1973
- Born: 23 September 1938 Paris, France
- Died: 23 January 2022 (aged 83) Paris, France
- Area: Artist
- Pseudonyms: Mézières, Mezi
- Notable works: Valérian and Laureline; Lady Polaris; Canal Choc
- Awards: Full list

Jean-Claude Mézières (French: [ʒɑ̃klod mezjɛʁ]; 23 September 1938 – 23 January 2022) was a French comics artist and illustrator. Born in Paris and raised in nearby Saint-Mandé, he was introduced to drawing by his elder brother and influenced by comics artists such as Hergé, Andre Franquin and Morris and later by Jijé and Jack Davis. Educated at the École nationale supérieure des arts appliqués et des métiers d'art, he worked upon graduation as an illustrator for books and magazines as well as in advertising. A lifelong interest in the Wild West led him to travel to the United States in 1965 in search of adventure as a cowboy, an experience that would prove influential on his later work.

Returning to France, Mézières teamed up with his childhood friend, Pierre Christin, to create Valérian and Laureline, the popular, long-running science fiction comics series for which he is best known and which influenced many science fiction and fantasy films, including Star Wars. Mézières contributed as a conceptual designer on several motion picture projects, most notably the 1997 Luc Besson film, The Fifth Element, as well as continuing to work as an illustrator for newspapers, magazines and in advertising. He also taught courses on the production of comics at the University of Paris VIII: Vincennes—Saint-Denis.

Mézières received international recognition through numerous awards, most notably the 1984 Grand Prix de la ville d'Angoulême.

== Biography ==
=== Early life and career ===
Raised in the Saint-Mandé area in the suburbs of Paris, Jean-Claude Mézières met his friend and frequent collaborator Pierre Christin at the age of two in an air-raid shelter during World War II. He was first inspired to draw by the influence of his elder brother who, aged fourteen, had a drawing published in the magazine OK. Mézières' initial inspiration came from such OK strips as Arys Buck by Uderzo, Kaza the Martian by Kline and Crochemaille by Erik. Later he was exposed to Hergé's The Adventures of Tintin, Franquin's period on Spirou et Fantasio and, his favourite of all, Morris' Lucky Luke. He had his first drawings published in 1951, at the age of thirteen, in the magazine Le journal des jeunes, published by Le Figaro. A year later, "completely fascinated by Tintin", he created an eleven-page strip, Tintin in California, which features an unusually muscle-bound Arys Buck-influenced Tintin. This was followed, at the age of sixteen, by La Grande Poursuite, a Western influenced by Tintin, Lucky Luke and Roy Rogers which he sent to Hergé in the hope of getting published. Hergé sent a reply encouraging him to keep up his efforts.

In 1953, the fifteen years old Mézières enrolled at the École nationale supérieure des arts appliqués et des métiers d'art for four years. His class there included two other aspiring artists who would go on to find success in the field of comics – Patrick (Pat) Mallet and Jean "Moebius" Giraud. With Giraud in particular, he developed a life-long friendship due to their shared interest in Westerns and science fiction (both men later worked together as production illustrators on Besson's The Fifth Element). At this time he also rekindled his friendship with Pierre Christin, who was coincidentally attending the high school next door to the Arts Appliqués, the pair bonding over a mutual interest in jazz and cinema. While at college, Mézières, like Giraud, published illustrations and strips for publications such as Coeurs Valliants, Fripounet et Marisette and Spirou magazine.

Following art college, Mézières entered military service, which at the time lasted twenty-eight months, including a tour of duty based in Tlemcen, Algeria, during the Algerian War, returning to France just fifteen days before the Algiers putsch.

Answering an advertisement in Le Figaro after his discharge from the army, Mézières was employed by the publishing house Hachette as an illustrator on a series of books titled Histoire des Civilizations (History of Civilization), for which he brought in Giraud to help him out with the well-paid chore. Intended to run to twenty volumes, Histoire des Civilizations folded after just five.

Introduced to Benoit Gillain (son of the famous comics artist Jijé) by Giraud, Mézières entered into a partnership with Gillain and they opened a studio in 1963. Working mainly in advertising, Mézières acted as a photographer, model maker and graphic designer. He also assisted Gillain with the setting up of Totale Journal, a publication he would later work for again upon his return from America.

=== Work in the United States ===
Mézières had been fascinated by the American Old West since he was a little boy through exposure to Western genre films starring the likes of Gary Cooper, Burt Lancaster and James Stewart and comics such as Lucky Luke and Jerry Spring. At the age of sixteen, he had attempted to travel to Mexico with Jean Giraud, whose mother lived there, but was prevented by his parents.

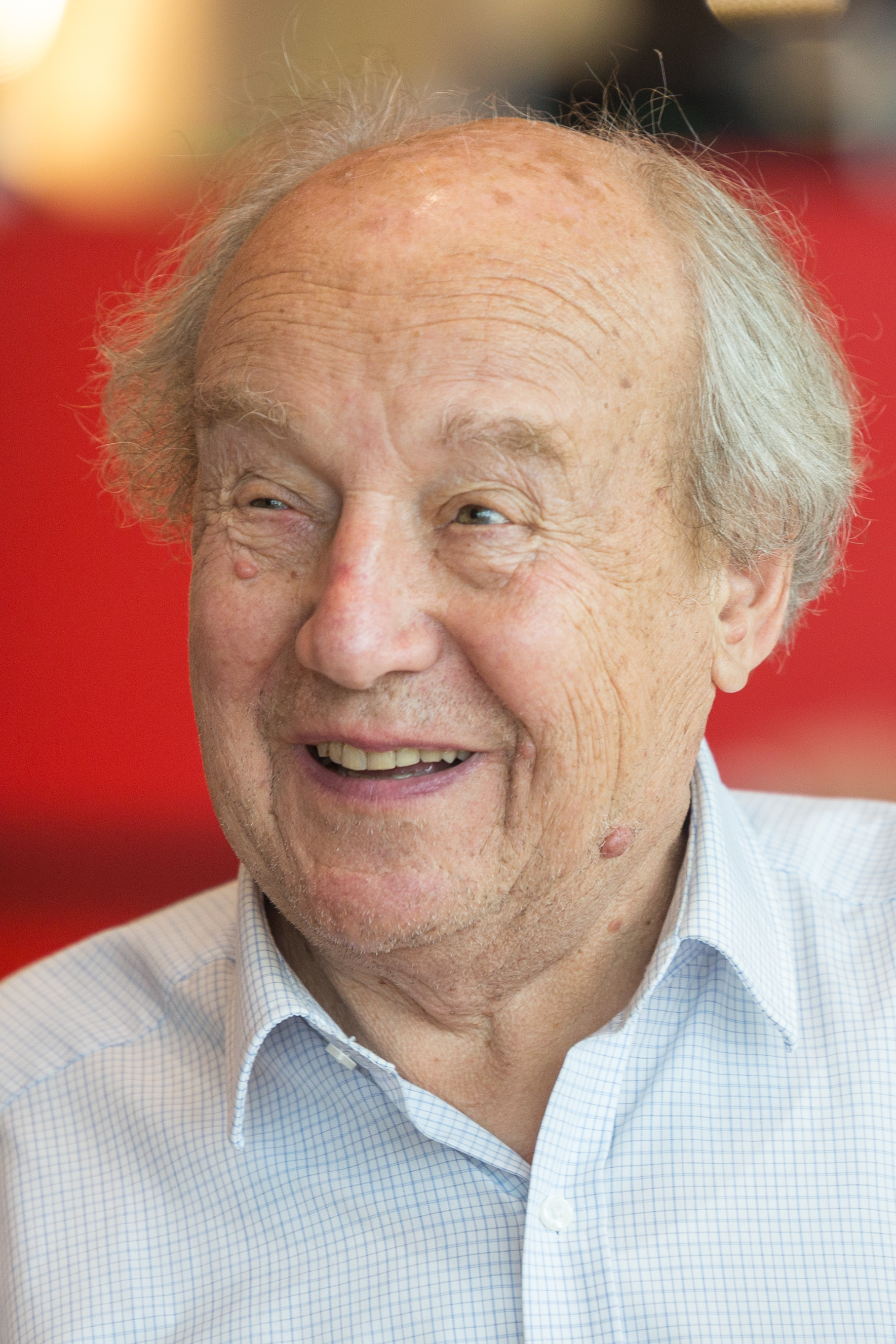
Mézières in 2017

In 1965, Mézières arranged a working visa through a friend of Jijé's who had a factory in Houston, Texas. In the end, however, he never took up the job in Houston. After staying in New York for a few months, the call of the West proved too strong and eventually he ended up hitchhiking across the country, first to Seattle and then to Montana (where he worked on a ranch driving tractors, laying posts and cleaning stables) before ending up in San Francisco. His initial plan was to find work in an advertising agency in San Francisco but he ran foul of the Immigration Service who told him that his visa was good for working in the factory in Houston and nowhere else. He quickly left San Francisco in search of an authentic "Wild West" cowboy experience. Arriving in Salt Lake City, Utah with no money, he sought out Pierre Christin, who was living there while teaching at the University of Utah, and turned up on his doorstep asking him if he could sleep on his settee. To make ends meet, Mézières produced some illustrations for a small advertising agency in Salt Lake City and for a Mormon children's magazine called Children's Friend as well as selling some photographs he had taken while working on the ranch in Montana. After a few months, he found work on a ranch in Utah: this time succeeding in his aspiration of living the life of a cowboy, an experience he described as "better than in my dreams".

When winter came and there was no work available on the ranches, he collaborated with Christin on a six-page strip called Le Rhum du Punch, a copy of which he sent to Jean Giraud who was by now writing and illustrating Blueberry for the Franco-Belgian comics magazine Pilote. Giraud showed the strip to Pilote's editor, Rene Goscinny, who agreed to publish it (issue 335, 24 March 1966). This was followed by another collaboration titled Comment réussir en affaires en se donnant un mal fou (How to succeed in business by almost killing oneself through hard work) which was also published in Pilote (issue 351, 14 July 1966). By this stage Mézières visa was almost expired and so he used the money from these strips to pay for his ticket home. In leaving America, Mézières also left behind a young woman, Linda, one of Christin's students: she followed him to France some months later and became his wife.

Mézières' experiences in the United States have provided the inspiration for several magazine articles published in Pilote, Tintin, and GEO magazines as well as two books – Olivier chez les cow-boys (Olivier with the Cowboys), a children's book written by Pierre Christin with photographs and illustrations by Mézières about a visit Christin's son Olivier paid to the ranch Mézières worked on in Utah and Adieu, rêve américain... (Farewell, American dreams...), again written by Christin with photographs and illustrations by Mézières, a nostalgic look back at their time in the United States.

=== Valérian ===
On his return from the United States, Mézières visited the offices of Pilote magazine to see René Goscinny and Jean-Michel Charlier. Goscinny put him to work on L'extraordinaire et Troublante Aventure de Mr. August Faust (The Extraordinary and Troubling Adventure of Mr August Faust), written by Fred. This would be the first serialised strip that Mézières would work on. Due to the lack of artistic freedom he was given (because Fred's script came with all the strip panels already blocked out), Mézières found this a difficult assignment.

By this time Pierre Christin was dividing his time between Paris and Bordeaux, where he was working on founding the school of journalism at the Institut Universitaire de Technologie (IUT). Meeting up with Mézières one day, Christin suggested that they work on creating a comic strip together. Both had their experiences in the American West to draw upon but felt, thanks to Lucky Luke, Jerry Spring and Blueberry, that the market for Westerns was already crowded. Instead, Christin suggested that they turn their hands to science fiction, a genre that, at that time, was not prevalent in French comics. Although Goscinny was not a science fiction fan, he wanted to promote innovation and originality in Pilote and so commissioned them to produce a strip.

Valérian and Laureline, Jean-Claude Mézières' most famous creations

Drawing on influences from literary science fiction, Mézières and Christin devised the character of Valérian, a spatio-temporal agent from the 28th century employed by Galaxity, the capital of the future Earth, to protect space and time from interference. Neither Mézières nor Christin had any interest in making Valérian into a clean-cut hero of the type that appeared in French comics of the time. Instead they sought to create an anti-hero, "a banal character [without] any extraordinary means of action".

The first Valérian adventure, Les Mauvais Rêves (Bad Dreams) appeared in Pilote in 1967, with the first installment of the story published on 9 November in issue 420, and ran for fifteen issues, concluding in issue 434 on 15 February 1968. Bad Dreams shares an artistic style similar to that of Mézières and Christin's earlier collaborations for Pilote, with influences from Franquin, Morris and Mad magazine artist Jack Davis. Also introduced in this story was Laureline, a peasant girl from the Middle Ages. Originally intended to appear in only one story, the popular reaction to the character meant that she was retained for subsequent stories and she has since become elevated to the main star of the series.

Bad Dreams was followed by La Cité des Eaux Mouvantes (The City of Moving Waters) and its sequel Terre en Flammes (Earth in Flames) in 1968 and 1969 respectively. These two stories show some evolution in Mézières' art but also retain the cartoonish influences of Bad Dreams. Jean-Pierre Andrevon best sums up Mézières' style at this time in his 1970 review of the story where he describes Valérian as a "kind of Lucky Luke of space-time". The City of Shifting Waters and Earth in Flames were collected together in one volume in 1970 under the title The City of Shifting Waters. This became the first Valérian album – Bad Dreams was skipped because of its short length – thirty pages – relative to the usual album length of around 46 pages. Every Valérian story up to and including The Rage of Hypsis in 1985 would debut in serial form in Pilote before being published as an album.

L'Empire des Mille Planètes (Empire of a Thousand Planets) premiered in Pilote in 1969 and marked a further development for the Valérian series and for Mézières art. This story was the series' first full-blown attempt at space opera and it set out for the first time the two main signature elements of Valérian: the use of science fiction as a political allegory and Mézières' meticulously detailed depictions of alien worlds. The follow-up story World Without Stars saw the final evolution of Mézières' art into the style that became prevalent in the Valerian stories of the 1970s and 1980s, with the first realistic renderings of Valérian and Laureline, as opposed to the caricatures of the earlier stories.

Valérian is Mézières' best-known work, translated into at least thirteen languages: the last album, L'Ouvre Temps, was published in January 2010. It is one of publisher Dargaud's top five best-selling comics series. Various attempts were made from the late 1970s onwards to adapt Valérian for film or television and an animated series, entitled Time Jam: Valerian & Laureline, made its debut in 2007.

=== Work in film and television ===
Mézières was always as interested in the cinema as he was in drawing. In 1957, he began work with Jean Giraud on creating an animated Western. Dissatisfied with the results, the project was abandoned after 45 seconds of animation had been completed. The same year he shot a short, ten-minute, 8 mm film, La vie d'un Rêve (Life is a Dream), with Pierre Christin.

The success of Valérian led to Mézières becoming involved in several, mainly science fiction, film and television projects. The first of these was Billet Doux (Love Letter), a 1984 television series starring Pierre Mondy as a comic strip editor for which Mézières mocked up comic book covers and characters. Also in 1984 he produced designs for director Jeremy Kagan who was attempting to adapt René Barjavel's novel La Nuit des temps (The Ice People). Due to difficulties experienced by the film's Iranian producer as a result of the Islamic revolution in Iran, the film was never made. Some of Mézières' production art was published in Les Extras de Mézières.

Concept art created by Mézières for Peter Fleischmann's Hard to be a God

In October 1985, Mézières was contacted by the German director Peter Fleischmann who proposed to adapt Russians Arkady and Boris Strugatsky's 1964 novel Hard to Be a God into a film. This was to be the first major German-Soviet co-production. Mézières travelled to Moscow to join the production team and also to Uzbekistan where it was proposed to shoot the film. Travelling from there to Munich, he produced several concept drawings and paintings over a three-month period before the project was suspended due to funding difficulties. At this point Mézières left the production and returned to France. Filming was eventually scheduled to begin in April 1986 in Kyiv and Mézières re-joined the production, creating storyboards for some scenes. However, at this time the Chernobyl disaster occurred only 100 km from Kyiv and production was again halted. The film was eventually finished in 1989, but Mézières' concepts were barely used. Again, many of Mézières' designs were later published in Les Extras de Mézières.

In December 1991, Mézières was approached by director Luc Besson, a lifelong fan of Valérian, who wanted Mézières to work on designs for a science fiction film called Zaltman Bléros. Along with his old friend Jean Giraud, who had also been approached by Besson, he began work producing concepts of buildings and vehicles for the futuristic New York depicted in the script. Interested by the flying taxi cabs that appeared in some of the drawings, Besson asked Mézières to draw more taxis and also a flying police car. By the start of 1993, production had stalled and Besson moved to the United States to work on the film Léon. Mézières returned to Valérian for the album The Circles of Power, published in 1994. This album made use of some of the concepts Mézières had worked on for Zaltman Bléros and featured a character, S'Traks, who drove a flying taxi around a great metropolis on the planet Rubanis. Mézières sent a copy of the album to Besson when it was finished. The commercial success of Léon led to Zaltman Bléros, now re-titled The Fifth Element, being green-lit for production. Mézières returned to the production and was amused to discover that the occupation of Korben Dallas, the film's main protagonist, had been changed from a worker in a rocket-ship factory to that of a taxi driver – obviously inspired by Mézières' drawings for the film and by The Circles of Power. Mézières produced further designs for the film including more taxis as well as spaceships and sets including the Fhloston Paradise liner seen in the latter part of the film. The Fifth Element was finally completed and released in 1997. Mézières published many of his concept drawings for the film in Les Extras de Mézières No. 2: Mon Cinquieme Element.

=== Other works ===
Art created by Mézières for a France-Rail advertising campaign

At the same time as he was working on Valérian and various film and television projects, Mézières also worked extensively producing illustrations and comic strips for magazines and newspapers such as Pilote, Métal Hurlant and Le Monde, as well as covers for books and art for advertising campaigns. For Le Monde, in 1993, he was a regular illustrator for the Heures Locales column.

Mézières was also involved at one point in giving hands-on courses on the production of comic strips at the University of Paris, Vincennes. Graduates of his course include André Juillard and Régis Loisel.

He collaborated with Pierre Christin on a number of non-Valérian projects. The first of these was Lady Polaris in 1987, an illustrated novel about the mysterious disappearance of a cargo vessel, the Lady Polaris. The narrative comprises various documents related to the lost ship: comic strips, log books, even an investigative journalism account by a fictionalised Mézières and Christin. The action takes place against the backdrop of many of the great seaports of Europe. Mézières undertook considerable research in putting together this book, visiting the ports of Liverpool, Copenhagen, Antwerp, Rotterdam, Hamburg, Lübeck, Bordeaux, Bilbao and Genoa.

Another collaboration with Christin was Canal Choc, a series of four albums about a television news team investigating strange phenomena. Mézières did not draw these albums but supervised a team of artists including Philippe Aymond and Hugues Labiano.

In 2001, Mézières was approached by the city of Lille, which had been designated European Capital of Culture of 2004, to produce something for the celebrations. He created a series of futuristic arches, called Chemin des Etoiles (The Way of the Stars) along the Rue Faidherbe in the city, similar to those seen at the Port Abyss spaceport depicted in the Valérian album At the Edge of the Great Void which was first published the same year.

=== Death ===
Mézières died on 23 January 2022, at the age of 83.

== Legacy ==
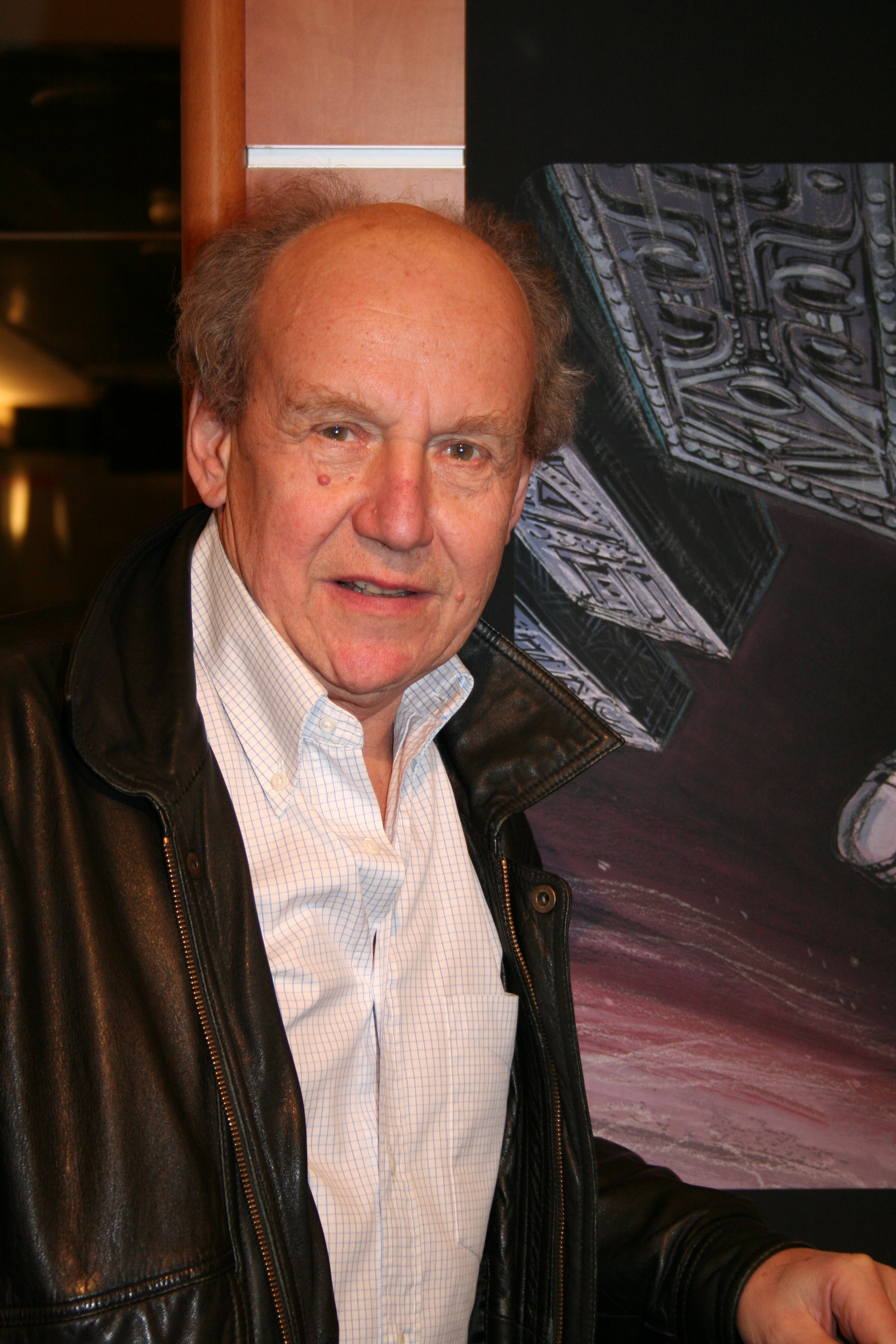
Jean-Claude Mézières in February 2007

Mézières' arrival on the French comics scene with Valérian was contemporaneous with the debuts of other notable French science-fiction strips including Luc Orient by Greg and Eddy Paape and Lone Sloane by Philippe Druillet. The success of these strips eventually led to the creation of Métal Hurlant, the highly influential French comics magazine dedicated to science fiction. Mézières' influence has been noticed in such strips as Dani Futuro (by Víctor Mora and Carlos Giménez) and Gigantik (by Mora and José Maria Cardona). His visual style also influenced some American comics artists, notably Walt Simonson and Gil Kane. On occasion this went beyond mere influence – following a complaint by Mézières, the artist Angus McKie admitted that several panels of his strip So Beautiful and So Dangerous were copied from the Valérian album Ambassador of the Shadows.

Outside of comics, Mézières' art has been especially influential on science fiction and fantasy film. In particular, several commentators, such as Kim Thompson, Jean-Philippe Guerand and the newspaper Libération, have noted certain similarities between the Valérian albums and the Star Wars film series. Both series are noted for the "lived-in" look given to their various settings and for the diverse alien creatures they feature. Mézières' response upon seeing Star Wars was that he was "dazzled, jealous... and furious!". As a riposte, he produced an illustration for Pilote magazine in 1983 depicting the Star Wars characters Luke Skywalker and Leia Organa meeting Valérian and Laureline in a bar surrounded by a bestiary of alien creatures typical of that seen in both series. "Fancy meeting you here!" says Leia. "Oh, we've been hanging around here for a long time!" retorts Laureline. Mézières has since been informed that Doug Chiang, design director on The Phantom Menace, kept a set of Valérian albums and Les Extras de Mézières in his library.

Mézières also noticed similarities between some of the sets in the 1982 film Conan the Barbarian and the planet seen in Birds of the Master and between some of the production sketches for the alien fighters in the 1996 film Independence Day and Valérian and Laureline's astroship.

== Awards ==
- 1984: Winner, Grand Prix de la ville d'Angoulême, the most prestigious award given at the annual Angoulême International Comics Festival
- 1987: Winner, with Pierre Christin, European Science Fiction Society award for Valérian
- 1992: Special mention by the jury, with Pierre Christin, Prix Jeunesse 9–12 ans (Youth Prize 9–12 years), at the Angoulême International Comics Festival, for Les Habitants du Ciel, an encyclopaedia of the alien creatures that have appeared in the Valérian series
- 1995: Nominated, with Pierre Christin, for the Haxtur Award for Best Short Comic Strip, at the Salón Internacional del Cómic del Principado de Asturias (International Comics Convention of the Principality of Asturia, Spain), for the Valérian album The Circles of Power
- 1997: Winner, with Pierre Christin, Tournesol Award given to the comic that best reflects the ideals of the French Green Party, for the Valérian album Hostages of the Ultralum
- 2018: Max & Moritz Prize from Comic-Salon Erlangen (Germany) for Special Prize for outstanding life's work

== Selected publications ==
- The Valérian and Laureline (1967–2019) – drawn by Mézières, written by Pierre Christin. The classic comic strip series depicting the adventures of spatio-temporal agent Valérian and his feisty redhead companion, Laureline, as they travel through space and time is Mézières' most widely known and best-selling work. With the exception of the short stories originally published in the digest-sized Super Pocket Pilote spin-off publication of Pilote, all albums have been translated into English.
- Mon Amérique à moi (My Very Own America) (1974) – an 8-page autobiographical strip, first published in Pilote, recounting Mézières' time in America in the mid-1960s.
  - An English translation was published in black and white in 1996 as a part of European Readings of American Popular Culture an academic publication edited by John Dean and Jean-Paul Gabillet. ISBN 9780313294297
- Mezi avant Mézières (1981) – a collection of Mézières' early work for magazines such as Pilote.
- Mézières et Christin avec... (1983) – compilation of early work, including the first publication of the Valérian story Bad Dreams in an album as well as Mon Amérique à moi and the strips Mézières produced for Métal Hurlant. ISBN 9782205025132
- Lady Polaris (1987) – an illustrated novel written by Pierre Christin, set against the backdrop of the great seaports of Europe, about the mysterious sinking of the cargo vessel, the Lady Polaris. ISBN 2862602035
- Les Extras de Mézières (Mézières' Extras) (1995) – a miscellaneous collection of works Mézières produced in the 1980s and early 1990s. Includes examples of Mézières' advertising work as well as concept designs for film projects. ISBN 978-2205044430
- Les Extras de Mézières No. 2: Mon Cinquieme Element (Mézières' Extras No. 2: My Fifth Element) (1998) – a collection of the concept drawings Mézières produced for the film The Fifth Element. ISBN 978-2205047516
- Adieu rêve américain (Farewell American Dreams) – part of the Correspondences de Pierre Christin series. Mézières and Christin reminisce about their American adventures. ISBN 978-2205049046
