= Christian De Metter =

French comic book artist

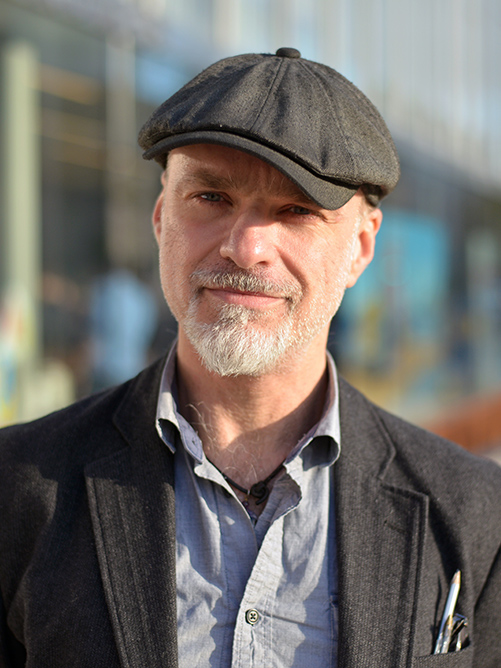
- De Metter in 2015
- Born: December 8, 1968 (age 57) Paris, France
- Areas: Writer, Penciller, Artist, Inker, Colourist
- Awards: Angoulême International Comics Festival Prize Awarded by the Audience (2005)

Christian De Metter (born 1968) is a French comic book artist.

== Biography ==
De Metter was born in a parisian area, he studied advertisements for a short period of time while pursuing his career, De Metter also took a variety of jobs, including model magazine and an illustrator for music magazines. De Metter entered pub school after getting a scientific baccalaureate, De Metter studied advertising design but left his advertising design study and began to make a living from being an artist, he also took a job as a music press and a model designer. His first published book, Emma, was released in 2000. In 2005 he won a prize at the Angoulême International Comics Festival. He provided the internal art for the graphic novel adaptation of Dennis Lehane's Shutter Island.

His 2021 comic book La Nuit des temps is based on the science fiction novel The Ice People by René Barjavel.

== Bibliography ==
Comics work includes:

- Emma (script and art, in Triskel, Soleil, 2000, collected, 2002, ISBN 2-84565-432-4)
- Dusk (with writer Richard Marazano, Les Humanoïdes Associés, 2000–2002, collected, 2007, ISBN 978-2-7316-1930-0)
- Le curé (with Laurent Lacoste, in Triskel, Soleil, 2001–2003, collected 2004, ISBN 2-84565-883-4)
- Le sang des Valentines (with writer Catel Muller, Casterman, 2004, ISBN 2-203-39115-4)
- Swinging London (with writer Thomas Bénet, Soleil, 2004–2005)
- Vers le démon (script and art, Casterman, 2006, ISBN 2-203-39147-2)
- Figurec (script and art, Casterman, 2007, ISBN 2-203-39168-5)
- L'oeil était dans la tombe (script and art, Casterman, 2008, ISBN 978-2-203-00440-5)
- Marilyn, de l'autre côté du miroir (script and art, Casterman, 2009, ISBN 978-2-203-01925-6)
- Shutter Island (with writer Dennis Lehane, graphic novel, William Morrow, January 2010, ISBN 0-06-196857-9)
- La Nuit des temps, (script and art, Phileas, 2021, ISBN 9782491467135)

== Awards ==
Awards include:

- 2004: Nominated for the Angoulême International Comics Festival Prize for Artwork, for Le curé
- 2005:
  - Won the Angoulême International Comics Festival Prize Awarded by the Audience, for Le sang des Valentines
  - Nominated for Angoulême International Comics Festival Prize for Scenario, for Le sang des Valentines
