= Les Chemins de Katmandou =

1969 novel by René Barjavel

- First edition
- Author: René Barjavel
- Language: French
- Publisher: Presses de la Cité
- Publication date: 1969
- Publication place: France
- Pages: 380

Les Chemins de Katmandou ("the roads to Kathmandu") is a 1969 novel by the French writer René Barjavel. It tells the story of a man who joins a group of hippies who live and travel in Nepal, where they take drugs and practice free love in the belief that it will free them from materialism, only to meet disappointment.

== Adaptation ==
The novel was written in tandem with a 1969 film of the same name (in English, The Pleasure Pit), directed by André Cayatte and starring Renaud Verley and Jane Birkin. The film had 1,635,664 admissions in French cinemas.
