= List of Valérian and Laureline books =

This is a list of all of the official Valérian and Laureline books. Each story was written by Pierre Christin, drawn by Jean-Claude Mézières and coloured by Evelyn Tran-Lé.

== Albums ==
Every Valérian adventure from Bad Dreams to The Wrath of Hypsis was first serialised in the Franco-Belgian comics magazine Pilote. The first story to be collected in comic album format was The City of Shifting Waters which was numbered "1" in the series. When Bad Dreams was eventually collected as an album, it was given the number "0" to reflect its position as the debut adventure in the series. The dates given in the following list are the year of first publication of each story in album format:

Order	English title	French title	Serialised in Pilote	Album published	French edition ISBN	English edition ISBN
0	Bad Dreams	Les Mauvais Rêves	Issues 420 (9 November 1967) to 434 (15 February 1968)	1983	978-2205078190	–
When a rogue technocrat called Xombul sabotages Galaxity's Dream Service and flees into the Middle Ages, spatio-temporal agent Valérian is ordered to follow and apprehend him. In medieval France, a peasant girl Laureline rescues him from a trap, and then serves as his guide to 11th century France, where they search for Xombul to foil his plans to attack Galaxity; Valérian then brings her back with him to the 28th century.
1	The City of Shifting Waters	La Cité des eaux mouvantes	Serialised in two parts. Part 1: La Cité des Eaux Mouvantes (The City of the Moving Waters), Issues 455 (25 July 1968) to 468 (24 October 1968). Part 2: Terre en Flammes (Earth In Flames) in Issues 492 (10 April 1969) to 505 (10 July 1969)	1970	978-2205077452	978-1849180382
Xombul escapes from prison and flees into the past to 1986, a time when a great catastrophe has caused the polar ice cap to melt. Searching the flooded streets of New York for Xombul, Valérian encounters sinister robots ransacking the archives of the United Nations.
2	Empire of a Thousand Planets	L'Empire des mille planètes	Issues 520 (23 October 1969) to 541 (19 March 1970)	1971	978-2205046229	978-1849180870
Valérian and Laureline are ordered to investigate Syrte-the-Magnificent, capital of the Empire of a Thousand Planets. Who are the mysterious Authorities and what is the dark secret at the heart of the empire?
3	World Without Stars	Le Pays sans étoile	Issues 570 (8 October 1970) to 592 (11 March 1971)	1972	978-2205046236	978-1849181181
A rogue planet, Zahir, threatens the newly formed Earth colonies on Uxbar. Travelling to Zahir, Valérian and Laureline discover a hollow planet ravaged by a never ending war of the sexes. Both sides must be reunited if catastrophe is to be averted.
4	Welcome to Alflolol	Bienvenue sur Alflolol	Issues 632 (16 December 1971) to 653 (11 May 1972)	1972	978-2205046519	978-1849181334
Earth's industrial colony Technorog is thrown into chaos when the planet's indigenous population suddenly turns up and claim their home, which they call Alflolol, back. Valérian and Laureline must find a way to enable the natives and the colonists to live together in harmony.
5	Birds of the Master	Les Oiseaux du Maître	Issues 710 (14 June 1973) to 722 (6 September 1973)	1973	978-2205046595	978-1849181525
Crash landing on a strange planet, Valérian and Laureline are enslaved by the minions of the mysterious Master and his terrifying Birds-of-Madness.
6	Ambassador of the Shadows	L'Ambassadeur des Ombres	Issues M14 (1 July 1975) to M17 (1 October 1975)	1975	978-2205046663	978-1849181785
While on a diplomatic protection mission, Earth's ambassador to Point Central, the vast space-station that acts as a meeting place for all the races of the cosmos, is abducted along with Valérian . Laureline travels from section to section of Point Central in search of the kidnappers. Much of the plotline of this album was adapted by Luc Besson to incorporate into the film Valerian and the City of a Thousand Planets.
7	On the False Earths	Sur les terres truquées	Issues M31 (30 November 1976) to M34 (1 March 1977)	1977	978-2205046410	978-1849181907
India, the 19th century, Valérian, acting as a soldier in the French Company of the Indies is part of a force attacking a Jain fort. Entering the temple inside the fort, Valérian finds an alien communications device. Reporting back to Laureline, he is surprised and shot, he plunges into a river and then straight out into space. Laureline looks on in horror – this is the 206th time she has watched Valérian die...
8	Heroes of the Equinox	Les Héros de l’équinoxe	Issues M47 (21 March 1978) to M50 (27 June 1978)	1978	978-2205046380	978-1849182133
Valérian competes, as Earth's representative, with three other champions from other worlds to find out who is the most suitable to repopulate the sterile planet of Simlane.
9	Métro Châtelet, Direction Cassiopeia	Métro Châtelet, direction Cassiopée	Issues M70 (1 March 1980) to M73 (1 June 1980)	1980	978-2205046397	978-1849182447
Valérian is in Paris, 1980 investigating mysterious apparitions in the metro. Laureline has been dispatched to the Constellation of Cassiopeia to find the source of the apparitions. What connection to they have to the two powerful multinationals Bellson & Gambler and W.A.A.M.?
10	Brooklyn Station, Terminus Cosmos	Brooklyn Station, terminus cosmos	Issues M82 (1 March 1981) to M85 (1 June 1981)	1981	978-2205046205	978-1849182638
Continued from Métro Châtelet, Direction Cassiopeia . Valérian attempts to discover where the fourth apparition will manifest. Laureline continues her search in Cassiopeia. All sides come together in Brooklyn, New York.
11	The Ghosts of Inverloch	Les Spectres d'Inverloch	Issues M110 (1 July 1983) to M117 (1 February 1984)	1984	978-2205046533	978-1849182935
Laureline is in Scotland, the guest of Lady Seal. Valérian is hunting for a native of Glapum't. Albert is in London, en route to Scotland. The Shingouz are on Rubanis seeking information from Colonel Tloc, the chief of police. Lord Seal is in the United States being updated on sabotage of the world's military hierarchy. The Chief of the Spatio-Temporal Service watches Galaxity fade into the mists of time. Who is the ghost of Inverloch Castle and why has he called this disparate group of people together?
12	The Wrath of Hypsis	Les Foudres d’Hypsis	Issues M128 (1 January 1985) to M135 (1 September 1985)	1985	978-2205046588	978-1849183048
Continued from The Ghosts of Inverloch. The team sets out from Inverloch in search of Hypsis. What consequences will Valérian and Laureline's intervention have for the future of Galaxity?
13	On the Frontiers	Sur les frontières	Not serialised	1988	978-2205046656	978-1849183123
A series of unexplained accidents at nuclear power stations alerts Valérian, Laureline and Albert that someone may be attempting to return Earth's history back onto the course they derailed in The Wrath of Hypsis. Following the trail across the borders of many countries, Valérian comes face to face with a rogue spatio-temporal agent they knew from the past.
14	The Living Weapons	Les armes vivantes	Not serialised	1990	978-2205046564	978-1849183192
Running short of money and with an astroship in need of a service, Valérian takes Laureline to the planet Blopik with a mysterious special delivery.
15	The Circles of Power	Les cercles du pouvoir	Not serialised	1994	978-2205041200	978-1849183260
Valérian and Laureline are on Rubanis, their astroship is desperate need of repair but they have no money. Reluctantly, they accept a job from Colonel Tloc, the chief of police – to find out who is controlling Rubanis from the Circle of Power.
16	Hostages of the Ultralum	Otages de l'Ultralum	Not serialised	1996	978-2205042955	978-1849183291
Valérian and Laureline are enjoying a luxurious cruise when the Caliphon, the son of the Grand Caliph of Iksaladam, is kidnapped, and Laureline with him, by the mercenary group the Mortis Quartet. Allying himself with some old acquaintances, Valérian attempts to rescue them.
17	Orphan of the Stars	L'Orphelin des astres	Not serialised	1998	978-2205045673	978-1849183314
Continued from Hostages of the Ultralum. Still pursued by the Mortis Quartet, Valérian and Laureline reach the Asteroids of Shimballil with the Brylian. Can they find a safe haven for him there?
18	In Uncertain Times	Par des temps incertains	Not serialised	2001	978-2205051865	978-1849183338
The trinity of Hypsis attempt to prevent the multinational Vivaxis from pursuing a line of genetic research. Valérian and Laureline move closer to learning the mystery behind the disappearance of Galaxity.
19	At the Edge of the Great Void	Au bord du Grand Rien	Not serialised	2004	978-2205053739	978-1849183345
The first part of a trilogy titled "In Search of the Lost Earth". Valérian and Laureline are acting as shopkeepers while trying to discover information about the disappearance of Earth. At the same time an expedition is about to leave for the Great Void, the unknown region at the edge of the universe.
20	The Order of the Stones	L'Ordre des Pierres	Not serialised	2007	978-2205057232	978-1849183369
Part two of "In Search of the Lost Earth". The expedition enters the Great Void where Valérian and Laureline encounter the sinister Wolochs.
21	The Time Opener	L'Ouvre Temps	Not serialised	2010	978-2205060263	978-1849183376
Part three of "In Search of the Lost Earth". Valérian and Laureline, with help of their friends from all previous albums, are searching for the Time Opener, an object that can help them defeat the Wolochs and restore the lost Earth in its place. The final volume of the trilogy and the series.
22	Memories from the Futures	Souvenirs de futurs	Not serialised	2013	978-2205068467	978-1849183383
First of two volumes containing short stories and post-scripts to Valerian and Laureline's earlier adventures.
23	The Future is Waiting	L'Avenir est avancé	Not serialised	2019	978-2205073836	978-1849184359
Second of two volumes containing short stories and post-scripts to Valerian and Laureline's earlier adventures.

With Jean-Claude Mezieres and Pierre Christin having retired from writing further Valerian & Laureline adventures in 2010, other writers and illustrators were later commissioned to create new stories.

English title	French title	Author	Illustrator	Album published	French edition ISBN	English edition ISBN
-	L'Armure du Jakolass	Manu Larcenet	Manu Larcenet	2011	978-2205067583	-
Valérian switches bodies and goes AWOL.
Shingouzlooz Inc.	Shingouzlooz Inc.	Wilfrid Lupano	Mathieu Lauffray	2017	978-2205076790	978-1849184014
The Shingouz lose Earth in a game of cards.
Where Stories Are Born	Là où naissent les histoires	Pierre Christin	Virginie Augustin	2022	978-1800440975	978-1849184014
Valérian and Laurelin go to high school.

== Short stories ==
Seven short stories were also published in the quarterly, digest-sized Super Pocket Pilote between 1969 and 1970 and later collected in Across the Pathways of Space (Par Les Chemins De l’Espace) (1997):

English title	French title	Published in Super Pocket Pilote
The Great Collector	Le Grand Collectionneur	Issue 3 (3 April 1969)
The Cogs of Uxgloa	Les Engrenages d'Uxgloa	Issue 4 (12 June 1969)
Tsirillitis the Asteroid	Tsirillitis l'asteroide	Issue 5 (23 October 1969)
The Sad Planet	La Planete triste	Issue 6 (25 December 1969)
Funny Specimens	Drôles de spécimens	Issue 7 (19 March 1970)
The Fflumgluff of Friendship	Le Fflumgluff de l'amitié	Issue 8 (25 June 1970)
Triumph of Technology	Triomphe de la technique	Issue 9 (29 October 1970)

== English translations ==
The American graphic magazine Heavy Metal serialized the first English translations of Valerian and Laureline with Ambassador of the Shadows in 1981. Several attempts were subsequently made to translate the series into English in book form, starting with Ambassador of the Shadows, World Without Stars, Welcome to Alflolol and Heroes of the Equinox by Dargaud imprints in the US, Canada, and the United Kingdom between 1981 and 1985.

"On the Frontiers", "The Living Weapons" and "The Circles of Power", translated by Timothy Ryan Smith, were collected in a single volume under the title Valerian: the New Future Trilogy, published by iBooks in 2004.

=== Hardcover collection ===
During 2017 and 2018 the British publisher Cinebook Limited published a hardcover collection of the series titled Valerian: The Complete Collection, spread over seven volumes, with three to four stories in each book. These volumes are in full original color, printed on glossy paper and measure 220 mm × 290 mm.

Volumes
Vol.	Title	Included stories	Release date	ISBN
1	Valerian: The Complete Collection Volume 1	0-2: (Bad dreams, The City of Shifting Waters, Empire of a Thousand Planets)	May 2017	978-1-84918-352-9
2	Valerian: The Complete Collection Volume 2	3-5: (The Land Without Stars, Welcome to Alflolol, Birds of the Master)	July 2017	978-1-84918-356-7
3	Valerian: The Complete Collection Volume 3	6-8: (Ambassador of the Shadows, On False Earths, Heroes of the Equinox)	July 2017	978-1-84918-357-4
4	Valerian: The Complete Collection Volume 4	9-12: (Chatelet Station - Destination Cassiopeia, Brooklyn line - Terminus Cosmos, The Ghost of Inverloch, The Wrath of Hypsis)	April 2018	978-1-84918-391-8
5	Valerian: The Complete Collection Volume 5	13-15: (On the Frontiers, The Living Weapons, The Circles of Power)	June 2018	978-1-84918-400-7
6	Valerian: The Complete Collection Volume 6	16-18: (Hostages of Ultralum, Orphan of the Stars, In Uncertain Times)	August 2018	978-1-84918-411-3
7	Valerian: The Complete Collection Volume 7	19-21: (At the Edge of the Great Void, The Order of the Stones, The Time Opener)	October 2018	978-1-84918-416-8

== Other publications ==
- Les Habitants du Ciel: Atlas Cosmique de Valérian et Laureline (literally "The Inhabitants of the Sky: The Cosmic Atlas of Valerian and Laureline") (ISBN 2205039210) is an illustrated encyclopedia that gives further background detail to the many alien creatures Valérian and Laureline have encountered in their travels, first released in 1991 by parent publisher Dargaud. It has seen several translations into other languages as well, including a 2017 one in English by Titan Books as Valerian: The Illustrated Treasury (ISBN 9781785656965), but adhering to the format set by Cinebook for its hardcover collection.
- Les Extras de Mézières ("Mézières' Extras") (ISBN 2205044435) compiles various miscellaneous Valérian related works including stamps, murals, images from the pilot episode of the proposed animated series in 1991 and Laureline's Playboy spread as well as other non-Valérian related artwork.
- Les Extras de Mézières No.2 (Mon Cinquieme Element) ("Mézières' Extras No.2 (My Fifth Element)") (ISBN 2205047515) primarily covers the work Mézières did on the 1997 Luc Besson film The Fifth Element but does also show where that film was influenced by the Valérian albums. Like the first outing, it is primarily an art book and neither has therefore seen any translated editions as of 2019.
