= David O'Brien (actor) =

American actor (1937–1989)

- Born: October 1, 1937; Glencoe, Illinois, U.S.
- Died: June 14, 1989 (aged 51); Manhattan, New York City, US
- Occupation: Actor
- Years active: 1963–1989

David O'Brien (October 1, 1937 – June 14, 1989) was an American actor best known for his long-running role as Dr. Steve Aldrich on the NBC daytime serial The Doctors (1967–82).

== Career ==
Born in the Chicago suburb of Glencoe, O'Brien also had roles on numerous other soap operas, including The Secret Storm, the primetime Our Private World, Search for Tomorrow, Ryan's Hope, and Loving.

His character on The Secret Storm was Kip Rysdale, who was the husband of the heroine of that show, Amy Ames, played by actress Jada Rowland. In 1976, the two actors were reunited when Rowland joined the cast of The Doctors as the second Carolee Aldrich, the wife of O'Brien's character.

One of his later roles was as Dr. Alan Glaser on Another World (1986–87). The role started out as that of a seemingly good doctor, but in the end, the good doctor was revealed to be the "Sin Stalker," responsible for killing off several supporting characters on the show.

Other television shows O'Brien starred in include The Adams Chronicles (TV mini series), The United States Steel Hour, The Heiress (TV Movie), The Cosby Show and Spenser: For Hire (as recurring character Tom Flaherty). He also appeared in the movie Arthur 2: On the Rocks.

== Death ==
O'Brien died in Manhattan on June 14, 1989, from acquired immune deficiency syndrome (AIDS) complications. His death notice in The New York Times stated that he died on June 15 and was survived by a sister and a nephew.

== Filmography ==
Year	Title	Role	Notes
1966	Line of Demarcation	L'aviateur écossais	
1966	Black Sun	Eliott	
1969	The Pleasure Pit	Jacques	
1988	Arthur 2: On the Rocks	Millionaire	
