= Les Dames à la licorne =

1974 novel by René Barjavel

- First edition
- Author: René Barjavel; Olenka de Veer
- Language: French
- Publisher: Presses de la Cité
- Publication date: 1974
- Publication place: France
- Pages: 338

Les Dames à la licorne ("the ladies with the unicorn") is a 1974 novel by the French writer René Barjavel and Irish astrologer Olenka de Veer. It is set in Ireland in the late 19th century and tells the story of five sisters who are connected to a medieval legend.

It was the basis for a 1982 television film with the same title, directed by Lazare Iglesis for TF1.

== See also ==
- The Lady and the Unicorn
- Young Woman with Unicorn
