= Time Jam: Valerian & Laureline =

- DVD box set cover
- Genre: Sci-fi; Fantasy; Adventure; Comedy
- Created by: Stéphanie Joalland; Marc Journeux
- Based on: Valérian and Laureline by Pierre Christin and Jean-Claude Mézières
- Directed by: Eiichi Sato; Philippe Vidal
- Composer: Alexandre Azaria
- Countries of origin: France; Japan
- Original language: French
- No. of seasons: 1
- No. of episodes: 40

Production
- Executive producers: Emmanuel Prevost; Robert Rea; Michiaki Sato
- Producers: Emmanuel Prevost; Robert Rea; Michiaki Sato
- Running time: 26 minutes
- Production companies: Satelight; EuropaCorp; Dargaud; JM Animation; Sentai Filmworks (licensor): Emmanuel Prevost; Robert Rea; Michiaki Sato

Original release
- Network: France 3 (France)
- Release: October 20, 2007 – March 5, 2008

Valerian & Laureline (ヴァレリアン＆ロールリンヌ, Varerian ando Rōrurinnu; French: Valérian et Laureline) is an animated television series based on the French comic book series of the same name written by Pierre Christin and drawn by Jean-Claude Mézières. It first aired in France in 2007.

== Plot ==
Space Time Agent trainee Valerian breaks the first rule of time travel and rescues Laureline, a girl about to be executed in 10th century France. The resulting shock wave alters the universe. When he and Laureline return to the future, Earth has disappeared; Valerian is forced to take on Laureline as his partner in order to fix the damage and prevent the both of them from being written out of existence.

== Production ==
An animated Valérian series was first proposed in 1976. In 1982, Mézières produced concept art for an episode titled The Asteroids of Shimballil (Les Astéroïdes de Shimballil). These were published in 2000 as an appendix to the album release of Bad Dreams.

In 1991, Dargaud Films financed the production of a three-minute pilot, directed by Bernard Deyriès and animated by Studio 32 in Paris and Luxembourg, but nothing came of this venture. Several stills from this pilot episode were published in Mézières Extras.

Another pilot, depicting Valérian and Laureline being pursued to the space station Point Central (first seen in Ambassador of the Shadows) by the criminal gang known as the Mortis Quartet (first seen in Hostages of the Ultralum), directed by Florient Ferrier, was made by the French animation studio 2 Minutes in 2001. Nothing came of this attempt either.

Another animated adaptation, titled Time Jam: Valerian & Laureline, was made in 2007. It was a French-Japanese co-production, directed by Philippe Vidal, involving Satelight, Dargaud and Luc Besson’s Europacorp. Scripts were written by a French team under the supervision of Peter Berts while Charles Vaucelle was responsible for the realisation of the characters and Vincent Momméja was responsible for the design of the locations and spacecraft. Music is by Alexandre Azaria. The French version of the series consisted of forty 23-minute episodes, while the Japanese version consisted of 11-minute episodes. Two trailers were released for the series: the first on 24 April 2006 and the second on 10 October 2006. According to Animation World Network, "Time Jam - Valerian & Laureline sets out to answer the question: Where on Earth has Earth gone? Valerian and Laureline, our two young heroes, seem to be the only representatives of the human race in the unsafe galaxy where the nightmarish Vlagos are conspiring to control the world. Sent out on an assignment by the head of STS (the Spatial-Temporal Service), Valerian and Laureline discover the existence of a time-portal, a mysterious phenomenon, which may hold the key to the recovery of Earth. The series from Dargaud Marina mixes 2D and CGI animation with an anime touch." The series was originally scheduled to air on France 3 in 2007, but aired on Canal + on October 20, 2007. French comic artist Yacine Elghorri was a character designer on the early art development of the series. As of September 24, 2010, the English dub is available for streaming in the US via Crunchyroll. The series has been licensed in North America by Sentai Filmworks for digital and home video release.

== Compared to the comics ==
The TV series differs from the original comics in that in the TV series Valerian comes from the year 2417 instead of 2720, and meets Laureline in the year 912 instead of 1000. Whereas in the comics Valerian takes Laureline back to his own time without any trouble, in the animated series this results in Earth disappearing from the Solar System. The couple settle in the galactic capital Central Point and realize they are possibly the only humans left. They begin a new life as space mercenaries and adventurers, exploring the new space-time continuum while at the same time attempting to rediscover the Earth.

Although its tone and storyline are different from the original work, this adaptation borrows many characters, settings and plot elements from the comics.

== Staff ==
- Production Coordinators: Cyril Noualle, Samuel Rozenbaum, Kiyoshi Akiyama, Nicolas Ito, Hokuto Iseki
- Assistant Director: Hiroshi Hara
- Animation Directors: Tooru Yoshida, Toshiyuki Kubooka
- Original Character Designs by: Charles Vaucelles
- Character Designs by: Fumihide Sai, Makoto Uno
- Mecha Designs by: Shōji Kawamori, Tsutomu Suzuki
