= La Tempête =

1982 novel by René Barjavel

- First edition
- Author: René Barjavel
- Publisher: Éditions Denoël
- Publication date: 10 September 1982
- Pages: 280
- ISBN: 2-207-22829-0

La Tempête ("the tempest") is a 1982 novel by the French writer René Barjavel. It is set in a near future during a chemically induced world peace, and follows a woman and a man in Paris who must find a future for humanity.

The narrative is inspired by the Biblical story of Judith and Holofernes. The book was published on 10 September 1982 through éditions Denoël.
