= Future Times Three =

1944 novel by René Barjavel

- First English-language edition
- Author: René Barjavel
- Original title: Le Voyageur imprudent
- Translator: Margaret Sansone Scouten
- Publisher: Éditions Denoël
- Publication date: 1944
- English publication date: 1958 (Award Books)
- Pages: 250

Future Times Three (French: Le Voyageur imprudent) is a 1944 novel by the French writer René Barjavel. It tells the story of two scientists who invent a substance which if swallowed allows a man to time travel. They travel to the future, where humanity has branched into different species with their own particular tasks. The book was published in English in 1958, translated by Margaret Sansone Scouten.

Future Times Three is the first novel to present the famous grandfather paradox of time travel.

== Adaptation ==
The book was adapted into the 1982 film Le Voyageur imprudent. The film was directed by Pierre Tchernia and stars Jean-Marc Thibault and Thierry Lhermitte.
