= Erle Cox =

Australian journalist and writer

- Born: Erle Cox; 15 August 1873; Emerald Hill, Victoria, Australia
- Died: 20 November 1950 (aged 77); Elsternwick, Victoria, Australia
- Writing career
- Language: English
- Genre: science fiction
- Notable work: Out of the Silence

Erle Cox (15 August 1873 – 20 November 1950) was an Australian journalist and science fiction writer.

== Life ==
Cox was born at Emerald Hill, Victoria, on 15 August 1873, the second son of Ross Cox, who had emigrated from his native Dublin as a youth during the early gold rush days of the 1850s. He was educated at Castlemaine Grammar School and Melbourne Grammar School. Following school, Cox worked as a wine-grower near Rutherglen, Victoria, before moving to Tasmania. On 24 December 1901 he married Mary Ellen Kilborn and some time later the couple settled in Melbourne.

In 1921, Cox joined the editorial staff of The Argus newspaper as a writer of special articles and book reviewer under the pen name 'The Chiel'; later he was the principal movie critic. In 1946 he joined the staff of The Age after being given notice from The Argus.

Cox died in 1950 after a long illness.

== Works ==
Three early works were published in the Lone Hand Magazine: Reprieve, Diplomacy and The Social Code.

- Out of the Silence, his best known novel, is set in Australia, and involves the discovery of a gigantic, buried sphere, containing the accumulated knowledge of a past civilization. It was published by The Argus in weekly instalments over a six-month period in 1919. The first Australian edition in book form was published by Vidler, in 1925. The same year a British edition appeared (Hamilton), and in 1928 an American edition (Rae D. Henkle). In 1934, the book was adapted to a comic-strip format by an artist identified only as Hix, likely Reginald Ernest Hicks. This pictorial version was published daily in The Argus in 120 episodes from August to December. In the same year, the novel was dramatised for radio presentation as a 25-part serial. The SF Encyclopedia notes that: "The novel exhibits some racist overtones" in reference to the eugenically inspired character Odi, who brought about the supremacy of a white race by devising a ray that killed only black people. The device of a buried sphere from a lost, advanced civilization clearly influenced René Barjavel's best-settling 1966 French science fiction novel La Nuit des temps, translated into English as The Ice People (1971).
- Fools Harvest was published as a fourteen-part serial in The Argus, in 1938, and was published in book form the following year by Robertson Mullen with two extra chapters.
- The Missing Angel, the third and final book by Cox, was published by Robertson Mullen in 1947.
