= Le diable l'emporte =

1948 novel by René Barjavel

- First edition
- Author: René Barjavel
- Language: French
- Publisher: Éditions Denoël
- Publication date: 1948
- Publication place: France
- Pages: 310

Le diable l'emporte ("May the devil take him") is a 1948 novel by the French writer René Barjavel. It revolves a future world war with devastating weapon technology, which forces the last surviving humans to live deep underground in a secret vault. The book has a pessimistic message about technology and celebrates the down-to-earth man and traditional farmer.
