= Shutter Island =

2003 novel by Dennis Lehane

- First edition
- Author: Dennis Lehane
- Cover artist: Chip Kidd (designer)
- Language: English
- Genre: Gothic, Psychological Horror, Crime
- Publisher: William Morrow
- Publication date: April 15, 2003
- Publication place: United States
- Media type: Print (Mass)
- Pages: 380
- ISBN: 0-688-16317-3
- OCLC: 51969184
- Dewey Decimal: 813/.54 21
- LC Class: PS3562.E426 S55 2003

Shutter Island is a novel by American writer Dennis Lehane, published by HarperCollins in April 2003. It is about a U.S. Marshal who goes to an isolated hospital for the criminally insane to investigate the disappearance of a patient who is a serial killer. Lehane has said he sought to write a novel that would be an homage to Gothic settings, B movies, and pulp. He described the novel as a hybrid of the works of the Brontë sisters and the 1956 film Invasion of the Body Snatchers. His intent was to write the main characters in a position where they would lack 20th-century resources such as radio communications. He also structured the book to be "more taut" than his previous book, Mystic River.

Lehane was inspired by the hospital and grounds on Long Island in Boston Harbor for the model of the hospital and island. Lehane had visited it in the Blizzard of 1978 as a child with his uncle and family.

A film adaptation of the novel, adapted by Laeta Kalogridis and directed by Martin Scorsese, was released on February 19, 2010.

== Plot ==
In 1954, widowed U.S. Marshal Edward "Teddy" Daniels and his new partner, Chuck Aule, go on a ferry boat to Shutter Island, the home of Ashecliffe Hospital for the criminally insane, to investigate the disappearance of a patient, Rachel Solando (who was incarcerated for drowning her three children). Despite being kept in a cell under constant supervision, she has escaped the hospital and the desolate island.

In Rachel's room, Teddy and Chuck discover a code that Teddy breaks. He believes the code points to a 67th patient, whereas hospital records show only 66 patients. Teddy also wants to avenge the death of his wife Dolores, who was murdered two years prior by a man called Andrew Laeddis, who he believes is an inmate in Ashecliffe Hospital. In World War II, Teddy helped liberate Dachau. After Hurricane Carol hits the island, Teddy and Chuck inspect ward C, where Teddy believes government experiments with psychotropic drugs are being conducted. While separated from Chuck in ward C, Teddy meets George Noyce, a patient who says everything is an elaborate game designed for him, and that Chuck is not to be trusted.

As Teddy and Chuck return to the main hospital area, they are separated. Teddy discovers a woman (in a sea cave he tried to take refuge in) who says she is the real Rachel Solando. She tells him she was actually a psychiatrist at Ashecliffe, and after discovering the illegal experiments being run by them, she was incarcerated as a patient. She escaped and has been hiding in different places on the island. She tells him to take care with the food, medication and cigarettes, which have been laced with psychotropic drugs. After returning to the hospital, Teddy cannot find Chuck and is told he had no partner. He escapes and tries to rescue Chuck at the lighthouse, where he believes the experiments take place. At the top of the lighthouse, he finds only hospital administrator Dr. Cawley seated at a desk. Cawley tells Teddy that he himself is in fact Andrew Laeddis (an anagram of Edward Daniels) and that he has been a patient at Shutter Island for two years for murdering his wife, Dolores Chanal (an anagram of Rachel Solando), after she murdered their three children.

Andrew/Teddy refuses to believe this and takes extreme measures to disprove it, grabbing what he thinks is his gun and tries to shoot Dr. Cawley; but the weapon is a toy water pistol. Chuck then enters, revealing that he is actually Andrew's psychiatrist, Dr. Lester Sheehan. He is told that his combat training, coupled with his history of violence, makes him an extremely dangerous patient, both to staff and other patients. After mounting pressure from the board of overseers, Dr. Cawley and Chuck / Sheehan were allowed to carry out this experimental treatment, allowing him to live out his elaborate fantasy, in the hope it would allow him to face reality, with the alternative being for him to undergo a lobotomy. Teddy / Andrew still refuses to accept the truth, despite the evidence presented, and is brought to a cell in ward C. After being sedated, he dreams about the months leading up to the death of his family. Because of his stubbornness and his alcoholism, he failed to realize the extent of Dolores’ mental instability despite the warnings of those around him, including his children. One day, he forgot to properly store away the laudanum meant to treat her before leaving for two weeks, returning to find Dolores having drowned their children while under the influence of the medication.

When he wakes up to find Cawley and Sheehan beside him, he accepts the truth of having killed his wife for murdering their children, and that everything is as Cawley and Sheehan says.

Dr. Sheehan later approaches Andrew again to ensure he has not regressed back into his delusion. Andrew, despite appearing to be at peace, talks to Sheehan as if he is Chuck and insists they need to get off the island. Sheehan signals Cawley and the warden, who approach with several orderlies and a large bundle of fabric with some metal on it.

== Adaptations ==
=== Film ===
The novel has been adapted into a film by screenwriter Laeta Kalogridis and director Martin Scorsese, starring Leonardo DiCaprio as Teddy Daniels, Mark Ruffalo as Chuck Aule, Ben Kingsley as Dr. Cawley, and Max von Sydow as Dr. Naehring.

The film was originally scheduled to be released by Paramount Pictures on October 2, 2009, in the United States and Canada. Paramount later announced it was going to push back the release date to February 19, 2010; reports attribute the pushback to Paramount's not having "the financing in 2009 to spend the $50 to $60 million necessary to market a big awards pic like this," DiCaprio's unavailability to promote the film internationally, and Paramount's hope that the economy might rebound enough by February 2010 that a film geared toward adult audiences would be more viable financially.

The film opened #1 at the box office with $41 million, according to studio estimates. As of 2019, this remains Scorsese's highest box office opening. The film remained #1 in its second weekend with $22.2 million. Eventually, the film grossed $128,012,934 in North America and $166,790,080 in foreign markets, for a total of $294,803,014, becoming Scorsese's highest-grossing film worldwide until The Wolf of Wall Street.

=== Audiobook ===
The HarperCollins audiobook version of the novel is read by David Strathairn.

The Audible Audio Edition version of the novel is read by Tom Stechschulte.

=== Graphic novel ===
The story has also been reworked into a graphic novel published by William Morrow, with art by Christian De Metter (ISBN 0-06-196857-9).
