= Bellecombe-Tarendol =

- Commune
- Location of Bellecombe-Tarendol
- Location within France Location within Auvergne-Rhône-Alpes
- Coordinates: 44°21′09″N 5°21′14″E
- Country: France
- Region: Auvergne-Rhône-Alpes
- Department: Drôme
- Arrondissement: Nyons
- Canton: Nyons et Baronnies

Government
  - Mayor (2020–2026): François Gross
- Area^{1}: 13.48 km^{2} (5.20 sq mi)
- Highest elevation: 1,312 m (4,304 ft)
- Lowest elevation: 474 m (1,555 ft)
- Population (2023): 77
  - Density: 5.7/km^{2} (15/sq mi)
- Time zone: UTC+01:00 (CET)
  - Summer (DST): UTC+02:00 (CEST)
- INSEE/Postal code: 26046 /26110
- ^{1} French Land Register data, which excludes lakes, ponds, glaciers > 1 km^{2} (0.386 sq mi or 247 acres) and river estuaries.

Bellecombe-Tarendol is a commune in the Drôme department in southeastern France.

== Population ==
Historical population
Year	Pop.	±% p.a.
1968	97	—
1975	81	−2.54%
1982	86	+0.86%
1990	85	−0.15%
1999	75	−1.38%
2007	94	+2.86%
2012	94	+0.00%
2017	75	−4.42%
2023	77	+0.44%
Source: INSEE

== See also ==
- Communes of the Drôme department
