= Shutter Island (graphic novel) =

2009 graphic novel by Christian De Metter

- Shutter Island graphic novel cover
- Date: 2009
- Main characters: Edward "Teddy" Daniels / Andrew Laeddis and Chuck Aule / Dr. Lester Sheehan
- Page count: 128 pages
- Publisher: TOKYOPOP and William Morrow

Creative team
- Writer: Dennis Lehane
- Artist: Christian De Metter
- Letterer: Lucas Rivera
- Editor: Bryce P. Coleman

Original publication
- Published in: Casterman
- Issues: Payot & Rivages
- Date of publication: 2008
- Language: French
- ISBN: 2203007753

Translation
- Translator: Bryce P. Coleman

Shutter Island is a graphic novel adaptation of novel of the same name by Dennis Lehane, published by TOKYOPOP and William Morrow. It was written by Lehane himself with art by Christian De Metter.

== Synopsis ==
In 1954, U.S. Marshal Teddy Daniels and his partner, Chuck Aule, are sent to Shutter Island to find a mass murderer who has escaped from Ashecliffe Hospital, a fortress-like federal institution for the criminally insane. As an intense hurricane bears relentlessly down on the island, the marshals are forced to piece together clues to a shocking puzzle hidden within Shutter Island, taking them on a dark, twisted journey, where paranoia assumes an air of cool rationality and the line between sanity and madness disappears.

== Plot ==
In 1954, U.S. Marshal Edward "Teddy" Daniels and his new partner Chuck Aule travel to the Ashecliffe Hospital, a federal institution for the criminally insane on Shutter Island, to investigate the disappearance of a patient, Rachel Solando, incarcerated for drowning her three children. She has escaped the hospital and apparently the island, despite having been kept in a locked cell under constant supervision. Chief psychiatrist Dr. John Cawley refuses to hand over records of the hospital staff, and Daniels and Aule are barred from searching Ward C and told that the lighthouse on the island has already been searched. The only clue is a note, which reads: "The law of 4; I am 47; They are 80; + you are 3; But who is 67?". Daniels believes that the note is a code that points to a 67th patient, when there are only 66.

Shortly after their arrival, a hurricane hits and the hospital goes into lockdown, prevents the Marshals from returning to the mainland. Daniels, starts having migraines, visions and disturbing dreams of his wife, Dolores Chanal, who was murdered in a fire set by a local arsonist named Andrew Laeddis, an inmate at Ashecliffe Hospital. Daniels reveals to Aule that locating Laeddis was an ulterior motive for taking the case, so he is there to avenge the death of his wife.

Suddenly, Solando has been found by the staff with no explanation. While Daniels is questioning Dr. Cawley on how they found Solando, he starts having a migraine. Dr. Cawley gives him pills and invite him to take a nap. Daniels has disturbing dreams of his wife again.

Daniels and Aule decide to break into Ward C. While Daniels is searching for Laeddis, a patient in a solitary confinement calls him by the name of Laeddis. Daniels realizes the patient is his friend, George Noyce, and questions him to find Laeddis. Noyce tells him that it is a setup and he has to accept that his wife is dead and let her go, or else he will never leave the island. He finally tells him that Laeddis has been moved from ward C, and Daniels deduces that he is at the lighthouse. While Daniels and Aule are searching for the lighthouse, Aule disappears and Daniels finds no sign of him. He returns to the hospital to ask Dr. Cawley if he has seen his partner. Dr. Cawley tells him that he has no partner and claims that he arrived alone.

During the night, Daniels tries to escape, but he finds the lighthouse, breaks into it and finds Dr. Cawley waiting for him. Cawley explains that Andrew Laeddis is actually Daniels himself. He explains that Andrew Laeddis is an anagram of Edward Daniels and that he murdered his wife, Dolores Chanal (an anagram of Rachel Solando), two years before after she drowned their three children during a manic episode. This is the answer of the code "the law of 4" and Laeddis is the 67th patient at Ashecliffe. Andrew refuses to believe it and shoots Dr. Cawley with what he thinks is his gun, but realizes it is a toy water pistol. Aule then enters and reveals that he is actually Andrew's psychiatrist, Dr. Sheehan. This setup has been designed to allow him to live out his elaborate fantasy, in order to confront the truth and accept reality; if he doesn't, he will be lobotomized. Andrew does not admit the truth. They hold him down and give him medicine.

Laeddis awakes in the hospital, under Dr. Cawley's watch. When questioned, Laeddis admits to having killed his wife, which satisfies the doctors as a sign of progress. Nevertheless, Dr. Cawley notes that they had achieved this state a few months before, but he had a regression and they cannot risk that again. Laeddis swears it will not happen again.

The next morning Laeddis sits outside next to Dr. Sheehan and tells him he needs to find a way to get off the island and go home; he has regressed once again, meaning that he will be lobotomized.

== Characters ==
=== Main characters ===
- Edward Daniels / Andrew Laeddis
- Chuck Aule / Dr. Lester Sheehan

=== Secondary characters ===
- Dr. John Cawley
- Rachel Solando / Dolores Chanal
- Dr. Jeremiah Naehring
- Bridget Kearns
- Rachel Laeddis
- George Noyce

== Genre ==
Shutter Island graphic novel is a psychological thriller with dramatic artwork, crafted in a noir, painterly style presented in shades of iodine yellow and drowning-victim blue. There are only a few slashes of bright colors placed in the nightmares.

== Publication details and release ==
Originally published in France by Payot/Rivages et Casterman in September 2008, TOKYOPOP and William Morrow, an Imprint of HarperCollins Publishers, announce the release of the graphic novel in Los Angeles on September 25, 2009 TOKYOPOP.

== Awards ==
Shutter Island (graphic novel) was an Official Selection at the 2009 Angoulême International Comics Festival, Europe's top comics exposition.

== See also ==
- For Dennis Lehane's novel, see Shutter Island.
- For the film based on the novel, see Shutter Island (film).
