= The Ice People (Barjavel novel) =

1968 novel by René Barjavel

First edition

The Ice People (French: la Nuit des temps) is a 1968 French science fiction novel by René Barjavel.

== Plot ==
Zoran's Equation

When a French expedition in Antarctica reveals the ruins of a 900,000-year-old civilization, scientists from all over the world flock to the site to help explore and understand. The entire planet watches via global satellite television, mesmerized, as the explorers uncover a chamber in which a man and a woman have been in suspended animation since, as the French title suggests, "the night of time". The woman, Eléa, is awakened, and through a translating machine she tells the story of her world, herself and her man Païkan, and how war destroyed her civilization. She also hints at an incredibly advanced knowledge that her still-dormant companion possesses. The man she says was frozen with her, a scientist, Coban, was the main source of interpretation of this knowledge, knowledge that could give energy and food to all humans at no cost. This knowledge was represented by Zoran's equation. She hates him for having separated her from her lover Païkan. The superpowers of the world are not ready to let Eléa's secrets spread, and show that, 900,000 years and an apocalypse later, mankind has not grown up and is ready to make the same mistakes again. Thus, the international team of scientists works under the constant fear of sabotage, a fear that eventually is fulfilled when one of the scientists kills one of his comrades and commits suicide. The scientists then decide to wake up the man, Coban, who could personally deliver the knowledge they seek. He would require a blood transfusion, but Eléa, the only living donor for his blood type, poisons herself to kill the man she hates and then die. She had, however, been replaying her actual memories of her last days prior to the freeze, to the scientists, and she was not aware that just as she was put under anesthesia for the freeze process, her mind was recording events around her that she was not conscious of, and at the last minute, her lover had confronted the scientist Coban, killed him, and taken his place. The man she had just poisoned with her dying blood was in fact her lover, for she had not seen the body for the whole of the book, and no one could have known the body was his. She dies before the scientists could tell her her tragic mistake, at the same moment her lover dies. All recordings and engravings of the advanced knowledge are either destroyed or now completely uninterpretable, and mankind loses this knowledge again. The novel ends with Dr Simon going back to France, heartbroken, ignoring the cries of war and the world youth's demonstrations.

"Ils sont là ! Ils sont nous ! Ils ont repeuplé le monde, et ils sont aussi cons qu'avant, et prêts à faire de nouveau sauter la baraque. C'est pas beau, ça ? C'est l'homme !"
"They're here! They're us! They repopulated the world, and they're just as dumb as before, and ready to blow up the house again. Isn't it great? It's man."

== Publication ==
This novel was first published in 1968 by les Presses de la Cité.

It was translated into English by C. L. Markham and a number of companies published The Ice People in the early 1970s. The English edition bears a dedication to Andre Cayatte, with whom Barjavel had worked on film, and who he credits as both the begetter of and the inspiration for the story.

Also translated into Afrikaans by Rina Scheiflinger (1971) as "Nag van die tyd" (the Night of time).

== Inspiration ==
The novel appears to have been inspired by one of the last groundbreaking works of Henry Rider Haggard, When the World Shook (1919). There are several similarities between the stories: a couple that is found in suspended animation with both, female and male, being survivors of ancient lost civilizations that possessed great technological advancements superior to the current stage of our world Both novels fit within the literary genre of Lost World stories.

Erle Cox's 1925 novel Out of the Silence has also been cited as a possible influence on Barjavel. Cox's story also deals with the discovery of a sphere preserving the knowledge of a vanished, prehistoric civilization with advanced technology, one man and one woman being preserved in suspended animation; the woman alone is awakened, but dies at the end of the story; the knowledge of the ancient civilization is lost.

The novel portrays momentous youth/student protests in both the antediluvian and modern storylines. The book was published in 1968 in the context of political unrest, especially among the youth of France, that led to mass protests that year similar to those depicted in the novel, see Protests of 1968 and May 1968 in France. However Barjavel made a note in the book explaining that it was originally written in 1966 and published in March 1968, and that the May 1968 riots had no influence on his writing

The novel also draws on myths such as the Sleeping Beauty, and the love that lasts beyond death, as in the legend of Tristan and Iseult.

== Adaptation ==
The novel was adapted into the comic book La Nuit des temps, written and illustrated by Christian De Metter. It was published by Éditions Philéas in 2021.

== See also ==
- Gondwana, the real world analog of a fictional continent, Gondawa, in the previous tectonic arrangement of the world
- 1968 in literature
