= René Barjavel =

French writer

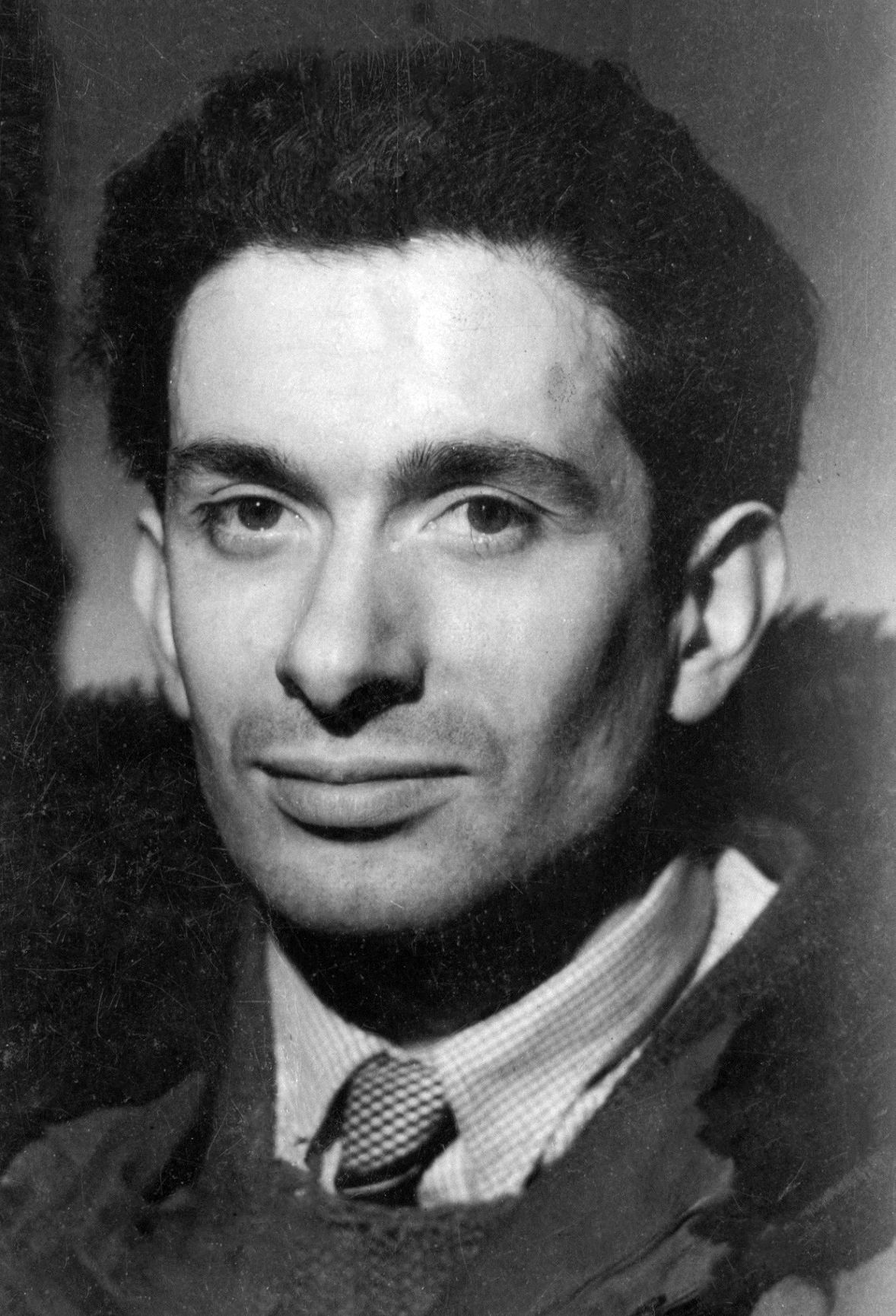
- René Barjavel in 1949
- Born: 24 January 1911; Nyons, France
- Died: 24 November 1985 (aged 74); Paris, France
- Resting place: Tarendol, France
- Occupations: Novelist, journalist, essayist, screenwriter
- Writing career
- Language: French
- Years active: After 1942
- Period: 20th century
- Genres: Science fiction, Fantasy, Thriller
- Notable awards: Prix Maison de la Presse 1973

René Barjavel (24 January 1911 – 24 November 1985) was a French author, journalist and critic who may have been the first to think of the grandfather paradox in time travel. He was born in Nyons, a town in the Drôme department in southeastern France. He is best known as a science fiction author, whose work often involved the fall of civilisation due to technocratic hubris and the madness of war, but who also favoured themes emphasising the durability of love.

René Barjavel wrote several novels with these themes, such as Ravage (translated as Ashes, ashes), Le Grand Secret, La Nuit des temps (translated as The Ice People), and Une rose au paradis. His writing is poetic, dreamy and sometimes philosophical. Some of his works have their roots in an empirical and poetic questioning of the existence of God (notably La Faim du tigre). He was also interested in the environmental heritage which we leave to future generations. Whilst his works are rarely taught in French schools, his books are very popular in France.

Barjavel wrote Le Voyageur imprudent (1943), the first novel to present the famous Grandfather paradox of time travel: if one goes backwards in time and kills one of their ancestors before he had children, the traveller cannot exist and therefore cannot kill the ancestor.

Barjavel died in 1985 and was buried with his ancestors in Tarendol (commune) cemetery, opposite Mount Ventoux in the Drome. He used these place names in his books; Mount Ventoux appears as the site of the space base in Colomb de la lune, for example, and Tarendol is the name of the hero in the eponymous novel.

== René Barjavel Prize ==
The Intergalactiques science fiction festival, held annually in Lyon, has awarded the René Barjavel Prize to the best work of science fiction addressing a chosen topic. The themes of previous prizes are:

- 2013: "The Augmented Man". Winner: Impress Genetic inc. by Élodie Boivin. Special jury mention to Fermata by Mathieu Rivero.
- 2014: “Eco-system(s)”
- 2015: "The Reckless Traveler"
- 2016: "The Galactic Empire Lies to You"
- 2018: "Open letter to living people who want to stay that way"
- 2019: "The world suddenly ends, and then the world finally had a reaction...". Winner: MAZUKU by Atmann Bonnaire
- 2020: "There is someone who lives in my head, and he does not live in this century".

== Selected filmography ==
- Women Without Names (1950)
- Midnight Witness (1953)
- The Return of Don Camillo (1953)
- The Terror with Women (1956)
- The Case of Doctor Laurent (1957)
- Chair de poule (1963)

== Bibliography ==
- Colette à la découverte de l'amour (1934)
- Roland, le chevalier plus fort que le lion (1942)
- Ravage (1943) – translated as Ashes, Ashes
- Le Voyageur imprudent (1944) – translated as Future Times Three
- Cinéma total (1944)
- Les enfants de l'ombre (1946)
- Tarendol (1946) – translated as The Tragic Innocents
- Le diable l'emporte (1948)
- Journal d'un homme simple (1951)
- Colomb de la lune (1962)
- La Faim du tigre (1966)
- La Nuit des temps (1968) – translated as The Ice People
- Les Chemins de Katmandou (1969)
- Les Années de la lune (1972)
- Le Grand Secret (1973) – translated as The Immortals
- Les Dames à la licorne (1974)
- Le Prince blessé (1974)
- Brigitte Bardot amie des animaux (1974)
- Les Années de la liberté (1975)
- Les Années de l'homme (1976)
- Si j'étais Dieu ... (1976)
- Les Jours du monde (1977)
- Les Fleurs, l'Amour, la Vie (1978)
- Lettre ouverte aux vivants qui veulent le rester (1978)
- Une rose au paradis (1981)
- La Charrette bleue (1981)
- La Tempête (1982)
- L'Enchanteur (1984)
- La Peau de César (1985)
- Demain le paradis, (1986) (not completed, edited after his death)

== See also ==
- L'Étrange Désir de monsieur Bard (film, 1954)
- Goubbiah, mon amour (film, 1956)
