= Panki block =

Panki
- Block
- Panki

- Location in jharkhand, India
- Coordinates: 24.03°N 84.47°E
- Country: India
- State: Jharkhand
- District: Palamu
- Block: Panki

Government
  - Type: Federal democracy

Population (2001)
  - Total: 123,820

Languages
  - Official: Hindi, Magahi
- Time zone: UTC+5:30 (IST)
- PIN: 822122

Panki Block is one of the administrative blocks in Sadar Medininagar Subdivision of the Palamu district, Jharkhand state, India.

== Demographics ==
Religion in Panki block (2011)
Religion	Percent
Hinduism	81.22%
Islam	18.19%
Other or not stated	0.59%

At the time of the 2011 census, Panki block had a population of 157,850. Panki block had a sex ratio of 955 females per 1000 males and a literacy rate of 57.24%: 67.86% for males and 46.10% for females. 28,173 (17.85%) were under 7 years of age. The entire population lived in rural areas. Scheduled Castes and Scheduled Tribes were 40,956 (25.95%) and 15,341 (9.72%) of the population, respectively.

Languages of Panki block (2011)
1. Hindi (58.3%)
2. Magahi (25.2%)
3. Urdu (13.9%)
4. Kurukh (1.97%)
5. Others (0.62%)

== Administration ==
=== Villages ===
Panki mandal/Block consists of 140 villages. The following is a list of villages in the Block:

1. Abun
2. Ahirgurha
3. Ambabar
4. Ambalori
5. Angara
6. Aparmanri
7. Ara
8. Asarhia
9. Aseahar
10. Auka
11. Bahera
12. Baherwatanr
13. Baida (village)
14. Balmuwan
15. Baludih
16. Banai
17. Bandubar
18. Baniadih
19. Banki Kalan
20. Banki Khurd
21. Banri Pakariya
22. Bara
23. Barkadaha
24. Barodiri
25. Barwadih
26. Barwaiya
27. Basariya
28. Basdiha
29. Bela
30. Bhang
31. Bhanwardah
32. Bhari
33. Bhuinya Kurha
34. Bidra
35. Bidra
36. Bihari Khap
37. Bihra
38. Birbir
39. Biritiya Dandar
40. Birtia
41. Biru
42. Bochdohar
43. Burhabar
44. Burhi
45. Chandarpur
46. Chandarpur
47. Chandwar
48. Chanpi Kalan
49. Chanpi Khurd
50. Chauphal
51. Chhapar
52. Chorea
53. Dandar Kalan
54. Daryapur
55. Dema
56. Dhub
57. Dundar Khurd
58. Duriatu
59. Duwarika
60. Ganeshpur
61. Garhganw
62. Giri
63. Gogar
64. Gongo
65. Gopaldih
66. Gorihara
67. Gudipahari
68. Haldiminhai
69. Harkhuwa
70. Harlaung
71. Harna
72. Hatwar
73. Herum
74. Hesatu
75. Hiringbar
76. Hoiyo
77. Husenigurh Alias Misir Gurha
78. Hutai
79. Irgu
80. Janjo
81. Jaspur
82. Jaspur Alias Cheribar
83. Jhagrudih
84. Jiro
85. Jobla
86. Jolah Bigha
87. Jotang
88. Kakargarh
89. Kamal
90. Kamat
91. Kamtola
92. Kaparphuta
93. Karar
94. Karma
95. Kasmar
96. Kelwa
97. Kerki
98. Khajuri
99. Khankhar
100. Khap
101. Khapar Manda
102. Kolhua
103. Korwatanr
104. Koseri
105. Kotiya
106. Kunwai
107. Kusri
108. Lawabar
109. Loharsi
110. Lukuwa
111. Mahe
112. Mahugain
113. Mahugain
114. Majhauli
115. Mangarpur
116. Manhi Pipra
117. Manran
118. Maran
119. Matnag
120. Matuli
121. Maulaganj
122. Mukta
123. Nagri
124. Naudiha
125. Naudiha
126. Nawa Garh
127. Nawadih
128. Nima Chak
129. Nuru
130. Pachamba
131. Pagar
132. Pakariya
133. Panki
134. Parasia
135. Pardohar
136. Parhiya Tola
137. Parsawan
138. Parsotimpur
139. Pathra Kalan
140. Phulwaria
141. Pipra Kalan
142. Pipratanr
143. Pokhraha
144. Porsam
145. Pundru
146. Puraini
147. Radhadih
148. Ranadah
149. Ranne
150. Ratanpur
151. Rengai
152. Sagalim
153. Salamdiri
154. Salgas
155. Sangaldipa
156. Saraidih
157. Saraiya
158. Sarauna
159. Sarjamatu
160. Sirma
161. Sons
162. Sorath
163. Sunri
164. Surjaun
165. Surjaun
166. Taiya
167. Tal
168. Taledih
169. Tarwadih
170. Tatidiri
171. Tetariadih
172. Tetrain
173. Thekhi
174. Tilamba
175. Titlangi
176. Tola Chatti
177. Tola Manran
178. Tunudag
179. Uchahra Kalan
180. Uchahra Khurd
181. Udih
182. Uksu
183. Ulgara

== See also ==
- Panki Assembly
- Palamu Loksabha constituency
- Jharkhand Legislative Assembly
- Jharkhand
- Palamu
