= Angoulême International Comics Festival Prize Awarded by the Audience =

Comics award category

Prix du Public (Angoulême)
- Native name: Prix du public – Cultura
- Description: Audience-voted comics award presented at the Angoulême International Comics Festival
- Country: France
- Presented by: Angoulême International Comics Festival

This Prize Awarded by the Audience - Cultura is awarded to comics authors at the Angoulême International Comics Festival since 1989.

The prize was known as Alph-Art du public from 1989 to 2003, the Prix du public from 2004 to 2006, in 2008 and 2009 the Essentiel FNAC-SNCF, since it was sponsored by the retailer Fnac and railway authority SNCF, in 2010 and 2010 the Fauve Fnac SNCF - Prix du Public and in 2012 Prix de la BD Fnac. At the end of 2018, the prize is "interrupted" because of the lack of sponsor.

The winner is in bold, the (long) list of nominees follows. No prize was awarded in 1999 or 2007

== 1980s ==
- **1989: Le Grand Pouvoir du Chninkel by Grzegorz Rosiński and Jean Van Hamme**, Casterman

== 1990s ==
- **1990: Broussaille (bande dessinée): La Nuit du chat by Frank Pé and Bom**, Dupuis
- **1991: Les Compagnons du crépuscule: tome 3, Le Dernier Chant des Malaterre by François Bourgeon**, Casterman
- **1992: Peter Pan: Londres by Régis Loisel**, Vents d'Ouest
- **1993: Théodore Poussin: Un passager porté disparu by Frank Le Gall**, Dupuis
- **1994: Jeux pour mourir by Jacques Tardi**, Casterman
- **1995: Peter Pan: Tempête by Régis Loisel**, Vents d'Ouest
- **1996: Thorgal: La Couronne d'Ogotaï by Grzegorz Rosiński and Jean Van Hamme**, Le Lombard
- **1997: Blake and Mortimer: L’affaire Francis Blake by Ted Benoit and Jean Van Hamme, after Edgar Pierre Jacobs**, Dargaud
- **1998: Le Cycle de Cyann: Six Saisons sur Ilo by François Bourgeon and Claude Lacroix**, Casterman
- (1999: no award in this category)

== 2000s ==
- **2000: Le Vent dans les saules (bande dessinée) part 3 by Michel Plessix**, Delcourt
- **2001: Les Bidochon part 17 by Christian Binet**, Fluide Glacial
- **2002: Le Cri du peuple (bande dessinée): Les canons du 18 mars by Jacques Tardi, after Jean Vautrin**, Casterman
- **2003: Titeuf: La loi du préau by Zep**, Glénat
  - Bouncer (bande dessinée): La pitié des bourreaux by François Boucq and Alexandro Jodorowsky, Les Humanoïdes Associés
  - Carnets d'orient: La guerre fantôme by Jacques Ferrandez, Casterman
  - Le Cri du peuple (bande dessinée): L'espoir assassiné by Jacques Tardi, after Jean Vautrin, Casterman
  - Édika: Peurs bleues by Édika, Fluide Glacial
  - John Doe: London Pepperoni by Alain Henriet and Baloo (cartoonist), Delcourt
  - Kookaburra Universe: Le secret du sniper by G. E. Ranne (Ange), Crisse, Nicolas Mitric and Christian Patrick, Soleil
  - Largo Winch: Shadow by Philippe Francq and Jean Van Hamme, Dupuis
  - Manhattan Beach 1957 part 1 by Hermann and Yves Huppen (Yves H.), Le Lombard
  - Le Nouveau Jean-Claude: Pizza mon amour by Jean-Louis Tripp and Tronchet, Albin Michel
  - Peter Pan (bande dessinée): Crochet by Régis Loisel, Vents d'Ouest
  - Phenomenum: Opus 0 by Jérémie Kaminka and Marc Védrines, Glénat
  - Plume aux vents: Ni dieu ni diable by André Juillard and Patrick Cothias, Dargaud
  - Le Retour à la terre: La vraie vie by Jean-Yves Ferri and Emmanuel Larcenet, Dargaud
  - Le Scorpion: La croix de pierre by Enrico Marini and Stephen Desberg, Dargaud
  - The Technopriests: Halkattrazz, l'étoile des bourreaux by Alejandro Jodorowsky and Zoran Janjetov, Les Humanoïdes Associés
  - Thorgal: Le barbare by Rosinski and Van Hamme, Le Lombard
  - Torso by Marc Andreyko and Brian Michael Bendis, Semic
  - Trolls de Troy: Trolls dans la brume by Scotch Arleston and Jean-Louis Mourier, Soleil
  - XIII: Lâchez les chiens by Jean Van Hamme and William Vance, Dargaud
- **2004: Blacksad: Arctic nation by Juanjo Guarnido and Juan Diaz Canales**, Dargaud
  - 100 Bullets part 1 by Eduardo Risso and Brian Azzarello, Semic
  - 20th Century Boys part 10 by Naoki Urasawa, Marvel
  - 32 décembre by Enki Bilal, Les Humanoïdes Associés
  - Bouncer (bande dessinée): La justice des serpents by François Boucq and Alejandro Jodorowsky, Les Humanoïdes Associés
  - Golden City: Le Dossier Harrison by Nicolas Malfin and Daniel Pecqueur, Delcourt
  - Ordinary Victories part 1 Emmanuel Larcenet, Dargaud
  - Là-bas by Anne Sibran and Tronchet, Dupuis
  - Mister George part 1 by Hugues Labiano, Rodolphe (comics) and Serge Le Tendre, Le Lombard
  - Pyongyang by Guy Delisle, L'Association
  - Quartier lointain part 2 by Jirô Taniguchi, Casterman
  - Sambre (bande dessinée): Maudit soit le fruit de ses entrailles by Yslaire, Glénat
  - W.E.S.T.: La Chute de Babylone by Christian Rossi and Xavier Dorison, Dargaud
- **2005: Le sang des Valentines by Christian De Metter and Catel Muller**, Casterman
  - Une aventure extraordinaire de Vincent van Gogh: La ligne de front by Emmanuel Larcenet, Dargaud
  - Shamo (Coq de combat) by Izo Hashimoto and Akio Tanaka, Delcourt
  - La Malle Sanderson by Jean-Claude Götting, Delcourt
  - Jeremiah: Et si un jour la Terre... by Hermann, Dupuis
  - Je veux le prince charmant by Hélène Bruller, Albin Michel
  - Lou! by Julien Neel, Glénat
  - Louis Riel by Chester Brown, Casterman
  - Lucky Luke: La belle province by Laurent Gerra and Achdé, Dargaud
  - Playback by Ted Benoît and François Ayroles, Denoël Graphic
  - Poulet aux prunes by Marjane Satrapi, L'Association
  - Say Hello to Black Jack by Shūhō Satō, Glénat
  - Thorgal: Kriss de Valnor (bande dessinée) by Grzegorz Rosinski and Jean Van Hamme, Le Lombard
  - Le Tour de valse by Rubén Pellejero and Denis Lapière, Dupuis
- **2006: Les Mauvaises Gens by Étienne Davodeau**, Delcourt
  - L'Aigle sans orteils by Christian Lax, Dupuis
  - Blacksad: Âme rouge by Juanjo Guarnido and Juan Diaz Canales, Dargaud
  - Bouncer (bande dessinée): La vengeance du manchot by François Boucq and Alexandro Jodorowsky, Les Humanoïdes Associés
  - Le chat du rabbin: Le Paradis terrestre by Joann Sfar, Dargaud
  - Cour royale by Martin Veyron and Jean-Marc Rochette, Albin Michel
  - Sam and Twitch: Squelettes by Marc Andreyko, Steve Niles and Paul Lee, Delcourt
  - Kinky & Cosy: C’est encore loin? by Nix (comics), Le Lombard
  - Largo Winch: Le prix de l’argent by Philippe Francq and Jean Van Hamme, Dupuis
  - Nana part 11 by Ai Yazawa, Ataka-Delcourt
  - Naruto part 20 by Masashi Kishimoto, Kana
  - Période glaciaire by Nicolas de Crécy, Futuropolis
  - Le Petit Bleu de la côte ouest by Jacques Tardi, Les Humanoïdes Associés
  - Roy et al. by Ralf König, Glénat
  - Terre de rêves by Jiro Taniguchi, Casterman
- (2007: no award in this category)
- **2008: Kiki de Montparnasse by Catel Muller and José-Louis Bocquet**, Casterman
- **2009: Mon gras et moi by Miss Gally, Delcourt**

== 2010s ==
- **2010: Paul (bande dessinée), tome 6: Paul à Québec by Michel Rabagliati**, La Pastèque
- **2011: Blue Is the Warmest Color (Le bleu est une couleur chaude) by Jul Maroh**, Glénat
- **2012: Portugal by Cyril Pedrosa**, Dupuis
- **2013: Tu mourras moins bête..., tome 2: Quoi de neuf, docteur Moustache ? by Marion Montaigne**, Ankama
- **2014: Mauvais Genre (bande dessinée) by Chloé Cruchaudet**, Delcourt
- **2015: The Old Geezers, t. 1 : Ceux qui restent by Paul Cauuet and Wilfrid Lupano**, Dargaud
- **2016: Cher pays de notre enfance : Enquête sur les années de plomb de la Ve république by Étienne Davodeau and Benoît Collombat**, Futuropolis
- **2017: L'Homme qui tua Lucky Luke by Matthieu Bonhomme**, Dargaud
- **2018: Dans la combi de Thomas Pesquet by Marion Montaigne**, Dargaud

(No prize awarded in 2019)

== 2020's ==
- 2020: Saison des roses by Chloé Wary, Éditions FLBLB
- 2021: Anaïs Nin, sur la mer des mensonges by Léonie Bischoff, Casterman
