= Former prizes of the Angoulême International Comics Festival =

List of former comics awards from the Angoulême festival

This is a list of awards and prizes formerly awarded at the Angoulême International Comics Festival.

== Longer-running awards ==
- Prize for Scenario (1993-2006)
- Media award (1981–2003)
- Bloody Mary award / Critics' award (1984–2003)
- Religious award (1985–2003)
- Humour award (1989–2001)

== Limited-run awards ==
=== Award for best French artist ===
- 1974: Alexis
- 1975: Jacques Tardi
- 1976: André Cheret
- 1977: Moebius
- 1978: Paul Gillon

=== Award for best foreign artist ===
- 1974: Victor de la Fuente
- 1975: Dino Battaglia
- 1976: Richard Corben
- 1977: Wallace Wood
- 1978: Derib

=== Award for best artist ===
This award was a continuation of the previous two.

- 1979: Ceppi
- 1980: François Bourgeon

=== Award for best French author ===
- 1974: Christian Godard
- 1975: Claire Bretécher
- 1976: Pierre Christin
- 1977: Jacques Lob
- 1978: Gérard Lauzier

=== Award for best foreign author ===
- 1974: Roy Thomas
- 1975: Sidney Jordan
- 1976: Raoul Cauvin
- 1977: Willy Vandersteen
- 1978: Sirius

=== Award for best author ===
This award was a continuation of the previous two.

- 1979: Ted Benoît
- 1980: Jean-Claude Forest

=== Award for best French publisher ===
- 1974: Glénat
- 1975: Futuropolis

=== Award for best foreign publisher ===
- 1974: National Lampoon
- 1975: Sugar

=== Award for the best promotion of comics ===
- 1976: L'encyclopedie de la BD by Pierre Couperie, Henri Filippini and Claude Moliterni, Serg
- 1977: Gérard Jourd'hui, a program on TF1
- 1978: Le 9e rêve, by the students of the Institut Saint-Luc in Brussels
- (1979: no award in this category)
- 1980: Découverte du monde by Larousse

=== Grand Prix for the graphic arts ===
- 1985: Giraud / Moebius
- 1986: Albert Uderzo
- 1987: André Franquin

=== Library readers award ===
- 1985: Le moine fou by Vink
- 1985 (joint winner): Tendre violette by Jean-Claude Servais
- 1985 (joint winner): Grimion gant de cuir by Makyo
- 1986: La voyageuse de la petite ceinture by Annie Goetzinger and Pierre Christin
- (1987-1998: no award in this category)
- 1999: Ibicus part 1 by Rabaté, Vents d’Ouest

=== Libération award ===
- 1987: Sambre: Plus ne m’est rien by Yslaire (artist) and Balac (author), Glénat

=== FM-BD award ===
- 1985: Les passagers du vent: Le bois d’ébène by François Bourgeon, Glénat

=== Lucien award ===
- 1986: La quête de l’oiseau du temps: Le Rige by Régis Loisel (artist) and Serge Le Tendre (author), Dargaud
- 1987: Le nain jaune by Jean-Claude Denis (artist) and Luc Leroi (author), Casterman
- 1988: Jacques Gallard: Zoulou blues by Tripp, Milan

=== School comic award ===
- 1985: Luong Dien Phong, Laurent Pavesi and Pascal Masslo
- 1986: Luc Jacomon from Epinal
- 1987: Nicolas Marlet
- 1988: Benoît Ers
- 1989: La terre est une belle plage by Moana Thouard
- 1990: Jochen Gerber
- 1991: Benjamin Sabatier
- 1992: Frédéric Rémuzat

=== Free Russia award ===
- 1986: Tintin au pays des Soviets by Hergé, Casterman

=== National comic contest ===
- 1992: Cédric Billotti (Cibi) and Vang Ye

=== Tournesol award ===
The Tournesol award, named after the French name of Professor Calculus from the comic book series The Adventures of Tintin, was awarded by the French Green party for the comic that showed best the typical ideals of the party. Since 2004, the award is no longer part of the official program of the Angoulême festival.

- 1997: Les otages de l’Ultralum (Hostages of the Ultralum), Pierre Christin and Jean-Claude Mézières, Dargaud
- 1998: Ikar: La machine à arrêter la guerre by René Follet and Pierre Makyo, Glénat
- 1999: Palestine by Joe Sacco, Vertige Graphic
- 2000: Paroles de taulard by Corbeyron et al., Delcourt
- 2001: Dans l’cochon tout est bon by Mazan, Delcourt
- 2002: Rural! and two other works by Etienne Davodeau, Delcourt
- 2003: Cambouis by Luz, L’Association

=== Graphical invention award ===
Also called: Award of the school of the image.

- 2001: Le canard qui aimait les poules by Carlos Nine, Albin Michel

=== Award for best dialogue ===
- 2002: Terrain Vague by Kaz, Cornelius
  - Agrippine by Claire Bretécher, Bretécher
  - Georges et Louis: La reine des mouches by O. Goossens, Fluide Glacial
  - Grand Vampire: Cupidon s’en fout by Joann Sfar, Delcourt
  - Promenade(s) by Pierre Wazem, Atrabile
  - Le Roi Catastrophe: Adalbert ne manque pas d’air by Lewis Trondheim and Parme, Delcourt
  - Le Singe et la Sirène by Dumontheuil and Angeli, Casterman
- 2003: Quelques mois à l’Amélie by Jean-Claude Denis, Dupuis
  - De capes et de crocs by Ayroles and Masbou
  - Lincoln: Grain de sable by Jouvray
  - Les Losers sont des perdants by Pichelin and Herse
  - La nurse aux mains sanglantes by Benoît Sokal
  - Powers by Brian Michael Bendis and Michael Avon Oeming

=== Polish award ===
Awarded by bilingual Polish comic readers.

- 2002: Pilules bleues by Frederik Peeters, Atrabile
- 2003: Le Chat du Rabbin by Joann Sfar, Dargaud

=== Worldview Award ("Prix regards sur le monde") ===
Awarded to a nonfiction or autobiographical comic.

- 2010: Rébétiko by David Prudhomme, Futuropolis
- 2011: Gaza 1956. En marge de l'histoire by Joe Sacco, Futuropolis
- 2012: Une Vie dans les marges by Yoshihiro Tatsumi, Editions Cornelius
