= Serge Le Tendre =

French comics writer

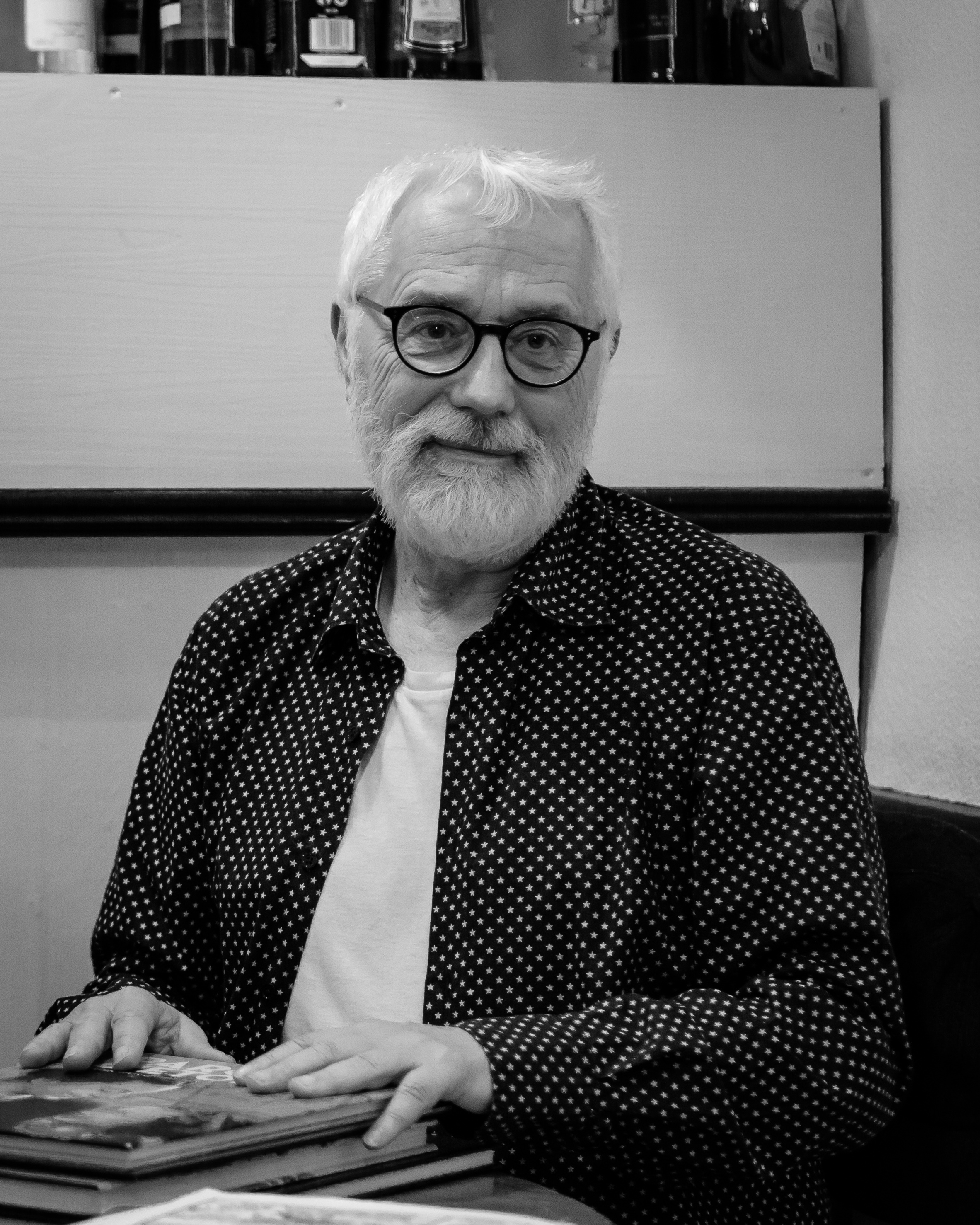
Serge Le Tendre during a meeting at Casa Antonio, in Rennes, in November 2016

Serge Le Tendre (born 1 December 1946) is a French comics writer known from his collaborations with Régis Loisel, Pierre Makyo, Christian Rossi and TaDuc. He wrote a number of series together with Rodolphe.

== Biography ==
Serge Le Tendre was born in 1946 in Vincennes, near Paris, in France. When he was 16, he started working as an assistant-accountant but two years later he started following the comics lessons at the university, delivered by artists and scholars like Jean-Claude Mézières, Jean Giraud, and Claude Moliterni. Fellow students included Régis Loisel and André Juillard. By 1974, he was writing short comics stories for artists like Annie Goetzinger and Dominique Hé, which appeared in Pilote and other magazines. In 1975 he created La Quête de l'oiseau du temps with Loisel, which first appeared in Imagine; it was restarted in Charlie Mensuel in 1982 and appeared in album format from the next year onwards. In 1984 he co-created the first two albums of Jérôme K. Jérôme Bloche for Pierre Makyo.

== Bibliography ==
The years given are for the album publications, not for magazine prepublications. All works in French unless otherwise noted.

- Chinaman (1997–2007), 9 parts, with TaDuc (published in English by Europe Comics)
- La Dernière lune (1993), 1 part, with Rodolphe and Antonio Parras
- Edmond et Crustave (1987), 1 part, with Christian Rossi
- Les Errances de Julius Antoine (1985–1989), 3 parts, with Christian Rossi
- La Gloire d'Héra (1996–2002), 2 parts, with Christian Rossi
- Golias (2012–2015), 4 parts, with Jérôme Lereculey
- White Claw (2013–2015), 3 parts, with TaDuc
- L'Histoire de Siloë (2000-), 3 parts, with Servain
- J'ai tué (2015), 1 part, with Guillaume Sorel
- Jérôme K. Jérôme Bloche (1985), 2 parts with Pierre Makyo and Alain Dodier
- Labyrinthes (1993–1995), 4 parts, with Dieter and Jean-Denis Pendanx
- Le Livre des destins (2004–2012), 5 parts, with Franck Biancarelli
- Mission Vietnam (2003), 1 part, with Patrick Jusseaume and Jean-Charles Kraehn
- Mister George (2003), 2 parts, with Rodolphe and Hugues Labiano
- L'Oiseau noir (1992), 1 part, with Jean-Paul Dethorey
- Le Paradis sur terre (2011–2012), 2 parts, with Laurent Gnoni
- Por amor al arte (1991–1994), 4 parts, with Pascale Rey (originally in Spanish)
- The Bleiberg Project (2017-), 3 parts, with Frédéric Peynet
- The Quest for the Time Bird (1983–2017), 9 parts, with Régis Loisel, Mohamed Aouamri and Vincent Mallié
- Taï-Dor (1987–1997), 7 parts, with Rodolphe and Jean-Luc Serrano
- Le Temps des châteaux (1985), 1 part, with Fabien Lacaf
- Terminus 1 (2016), 2 parts, with Jean-Michel Ponzio
- Tirésias (2001), 2 parts, with Christian Rossi
- Vestiges de l'Aube (2014–2015), 2 parts, with Frédéric Peynet
- Les Voyages de Takuan (1987–1996), 5 parts, with Emiliano Simeoni and TaDuc

== Awards ==
- 1985: won the Award of the Public at the Prix Saint-Michel for Jérôme K. Jérôme Bloche
- 1986: won the Lucien award at the Angoulême festival for La Quête de l'oiseau du temps
- 1986: Prix Yellow-Kid for best foreign artist
- 1999: Angoulême International Comics Festival Prix Jeunesse 9–12 ans for La Quête de l'oiseau du temps
- 2002: nominated for the Angoulême International Comics Festival Prize for Best Album for Tirésias
- 2002: Prix Bob Morane for Tirésias
- 2004: nominated for the Angoulême International Comics Festival Prize Awarded by the Audience for Mister George
