= Tu mourras moins bête... =

French television series

- Genre: Information show
- Country of origin: France
- Original language: French
- No. of seasons: 4
- No. of episodes: 130 (list of episodes)

Production
- Running time: 3 minutes

Original release
- Release: January 2016 – 2020

Tu mourras moins bête... (You will die less stupid...) (German name: Wer nicht fragt, stirbt dumm! (He who doesn't ask dies stupid!)) is a French television show on Franco-German TV network Arte. The animation series is based on the blog Tu mourras moins bête by French comic artist Marion Montaigne.

== Plot ==
In the stories, the omniscient Professor Moustache (German name: Professor Schnauzbart) finds answers to curious questions from the world of science.

== Cast ==
- François Morel as Professor Moustache
- Jérôme Pauwels as Nathanaël

== Synchronous voices ==
The synchronous work for the German version is carried out by Christa Kistner Synchronproduktion, and the dialogue direction is made by Olaf Mierau.

== Episode list ==
Part	Season	Episode	German title	French title
1	1	1	Immunologie	L'immunologie
2	1	2	Liebling, ich habe die Kinder geschrumpft	Chérie, j'veux rétrécir les gosses
3	1	3	Angst vorm Fliegen	La peur en avio
4	1	4	Wann gehen Laserschwerter in Serie?	À quand le sabre laser?
5	1	5	Der Sprung von der Golden Gate Bridge	Le saut du Golden Gate
6	1	6	Im Schlaf eine Spinne verschlucken	Avaler une araignée en dormant
7	1	7	Die Kopftransplantation	Greffer une tête sur un corps
8	1	8	Sich unsichtbar machen	Petite leçon d’hobbitologie
9	1	9	Meine Freundin liebt ein Pony	Ma copine veut épouser un poney
10	1	10	Das Higgs-Boson	Le boson de Higgs, quèsaco?
11	1	11	Kryokonservierung	La cryogénisation c'est pour quand?
12	1	12	Verhaltensforschung bei Tieren	L'ophtalmologie chez les animaux
13	1	13	Kleine Waffenkunde	Aux armes, etc.
14	1	14	Wie funktioniert ein Atomkraftwerk?	Comment ça marche une centrale nucléaire?
15	1	15	Geniale Wissenschaftler	Études scientifiques improbables
16	1	16	Auswirkungen von Alkohol	L'alcool c'est bon, mais pas pour la santé
17	1	17	Mit dem Fahrstuhl ins Weltall?	L'ascenseur spatial, c'est pour quand?
18	1	18	Auf Reise wie die Aliens?	Quand pourrons-nous voyager comme dans „Alien“ ?
19	1	19	Was ist eine Nahtoderfahrung?	C'est quoi une „Near Death Experience“?
20	1	20	Tun Schussverletzungen weh?	Blessures par balles, ça fait mal?
21	1	21	Warum träumen wir?	À quoi servent les rêves?
22	1	22	Warum sind Jugendliche so schlapp?	Pouquoi les ados sont-ils mous?
23	1	23	Wann gibt es einen Terminator?	Terminator, c'est pour quand?
24	1	24	Nicht ohne meine Milben!	Jamais sans mes acariens!
25	1	25	Die hartnäckigen Fette	Perdre son gras, pas une mince affaire!
26	1	26	Tiere treiben's tierisch	Les animaux s’aiment comme des bêtes
27	1	27	Hundefuttertest	Pâtée pour chiens
28	1	28	Überarbeitete Genies	Les chercheurs surmenés
29	1	29	Hatten die Dinos Federn?	Les dinosaures avaient-ils des plumes?
30	1	30	Das Sexualleben bei Menschen und Affen	Évolution sexuelle de l’homme
31	2	1	Eine Frage des Gehirns	Le cerveau de Lucy
32	2	2	Plazenta-Kannibalismus	Placentophagie
33	2	3	Ihr Freund und Helfer	Les stups dans les films
34	2	4	Vom Winde verweht	Autant en emporte le vent
35	2	5	Darth Vader Melancholia	La triste vie de Darth Vader
36	2	6	Schwer verdaulich	Peut-on être digéré vivant?
37	2	7	Die Hölle: das sind die Anderen	La foule: l'enfer, c'est les autres
38	2	8	Risiko Feuchtgebiete	Les lunettes de la peur
39	2	9	Astrophysik oder Das Ende der Welt	Astrophysicien, c'est bien
40	2	10	Reise zum Mittelpunkt der Erde	Voyage au centre de la Terre
41	2	11	Verdorbene Tiere	Animaux dépravés
42	2	12	Freudianische Phasen	Stades freudiens
43	2	13	Weltraumkoller	Folie spatiale
44	2	14	Gandalfs Fallbeispiel	La science gandalphique
45	2	15	Acne vulgaris	Dermatologie
46	2	16	Wie trieben es die Dinosaurier?	L'amour jurassique
47	2	17	Trügerisches Gedächtnis	Comment fonctionne la mémoire des visages?
48	2	18	Baumgartners Supercruise	Felix Baumgartner franchit le mur du son
49	2	19	Das Problem mit der Schwerkraft	Vol parabolique
50	2	20	Helden im OP	Les séries médicales à la télé
51	2	21	Männer auf öffentlichen Toiletten	Des urinoirs et des hommes
52	2	22	Teleportation	Téléportation
53	2	23	Wer schön sein will, muss leiden	La cosmétique
54	2	24	Glücklose Wissenschaftler	Les scientifiques malchanceux
55	2	25	Wie funktionieren Gesichtstransplantationen?	Greffe de visages
56	2	26	Darwins wahre Geschichte	Darwin
57	2	27	Kleine Impfkunde	Vaccinologie
58	2	28	Sind Zeitreisen denkbar?	Voyage dans le temps
59	2	29	Crashtests	La biomécanique
60	2	30	Wohin mit einem toten Astronauten?	Que faire d'un cadavre spatial?
61	2	31	Verstrahlte Superhelden	S'irradier au ciné
62	2	32	Der Hodensack	Briller en société avec le plexus coeliaque
63	2	33	Was tut ein forensischer Entomologe?	Entomologie forensique
64	2	34	Warum sabbern Babys?	La bave
65	2	35	Turbulenzen	Les turbulences
66	2	36	Das Fossil Donald Trump	Comment devenir un beau fossile?
67	2	37	Kann man unter Wasser atmen?	Respirer sous l'eau
68	2	38	Tiermimik	Expression des animaux
69	2	39	Total gedopt	Tous dopés
70	2	40	Schwule Tiere	Les animaux gays
71	3	1	Mais auf dem Mars?	Incompétence interstellaire
72	3	2	Antike Anatomie	Anatomie antique
73	3	3	Was ist ein narzisstischer Perverser?	Pervers narcissique
74	3	4	Fruchtfliegen-Blues	Blues de mouche
75	3	5	Zukunft laut Tom Cruise	Le futur selon Tom Cruise
76	3	6	Was ist eine Fäkaltherapie?	Neurones gastriques
77	3	7	Challenge für den Weihnachtsmann	La physique du Père Noël
78	3	8	Erektion für Ladys?	Le désir féminin
79	3	9	Wie geht Menstruation?	28 jours plus tard
80	3	10	Wie entsteht eine Erektion?	Zobologie
81	3	11	Gibt es auch Brief-Raben?	Corbeaux voyageurs
82	3	12	Was ist ein Ig-Nobelpreis?	Les Ig-Nobels
83	3	13	Warum gibt es keine Fallschirme in Passagierflugzeugen?	Des parachutes !
84	3	14	Fleißig wie eine Biene?	La paresse
85	3	15	Was bedeutet passiv-aggressiv?	Passif-agressif
86	3	16	Wie groß ist eine Klitoris?	Le mystère de la chambre rose
87	3	17	Das wahre Gesicht von großen Forschern	Psychiatrie des èrudits
88	3	18	Wie kann Iron Man in seiner Rüstung überleben?	Iron cardiologie
89	3	19	Kann man Dinos klonen?	Cloner des dinos
90	3	20	Warum ist nicht jeder fotogen?	La Non-photogénie
91	3	21	Wie glaubwürdig sind Arztserien?	Séries médicales, encore
92	3	22	Kann man schlechte Gene einfach aussortieren?	La Génétique facile
93	3	23	Regieren Autopiloten die Welt?	Pilote automatique
94	3	24	Punks der Wissenschaft	Scientifiques punks
95	3	25	Kann man Gene zwischen Mensch und Tier austauschen?	Transfert de gène
96	3	26	Atomversuch mit Ziege	Chèvre atomique
97	3	27	Was sind Pseudowissenschaften?	Pseudosciences
98	3	28	Wie verläuft ein wissenschaftlicher Kongress?	Congrès scientifique
99	3	29	Was ist eigentlich ein Blob?	Le Blob
100	3	30	Wie entsteht Schadenfreude?	Se réjouir du malheur d'autrui

== Reception ==
On the occasion of the broadcast of the first episode of Tu mourras moins bête, in 2015, the cultural magazine Télérama rewarded the series with two T's,which in its rating system means We like a lot. The critic highlights in particular the author's sense of humor: "Marion Montaigne masters in any case perfectly the mechanisms of laughter: she is able to tease our armpits with the Higgs boson, the operation of a nuclear power plant or ophthalmology in animals.

In October, during the broadcast of the second season of the series, the Arte channel made known its satisfaction by noting nearly thirteen million views of episodes in total, and a strong acceleration of the audience of the Youtube channel Tu mourirras moins bête, whose number of subscribers has experienced "a very strong increase, from 33,000 to 177,000 subscribers, an increase of more than 500% in just over a month,"adding that "Every new video is in the top 10 of YouTube Uk Trends.

== Literature ==
- Marion Montaigne: La science, c'est pas du cinéma! Ankama, Paris 2011, ISBN 978-2-35910-220-8
- Marion Montaigne: Quoi de neuf, docteur Moustache? Ankama, Paris 2012, ISBN 978-2-35910-293-2
- Marion Montaigne: Science un jour, Science toujours! Delcourt, Paris 2014, ISBN 978-2-7560-6183-2
- Marion Montaigne: Professeur Moustache étale sa science! Delcourt, Paris 2015, ISBN 978-2-7560-7317-0
