= Emmanuelle Polack =

French art historian (b. 1965)

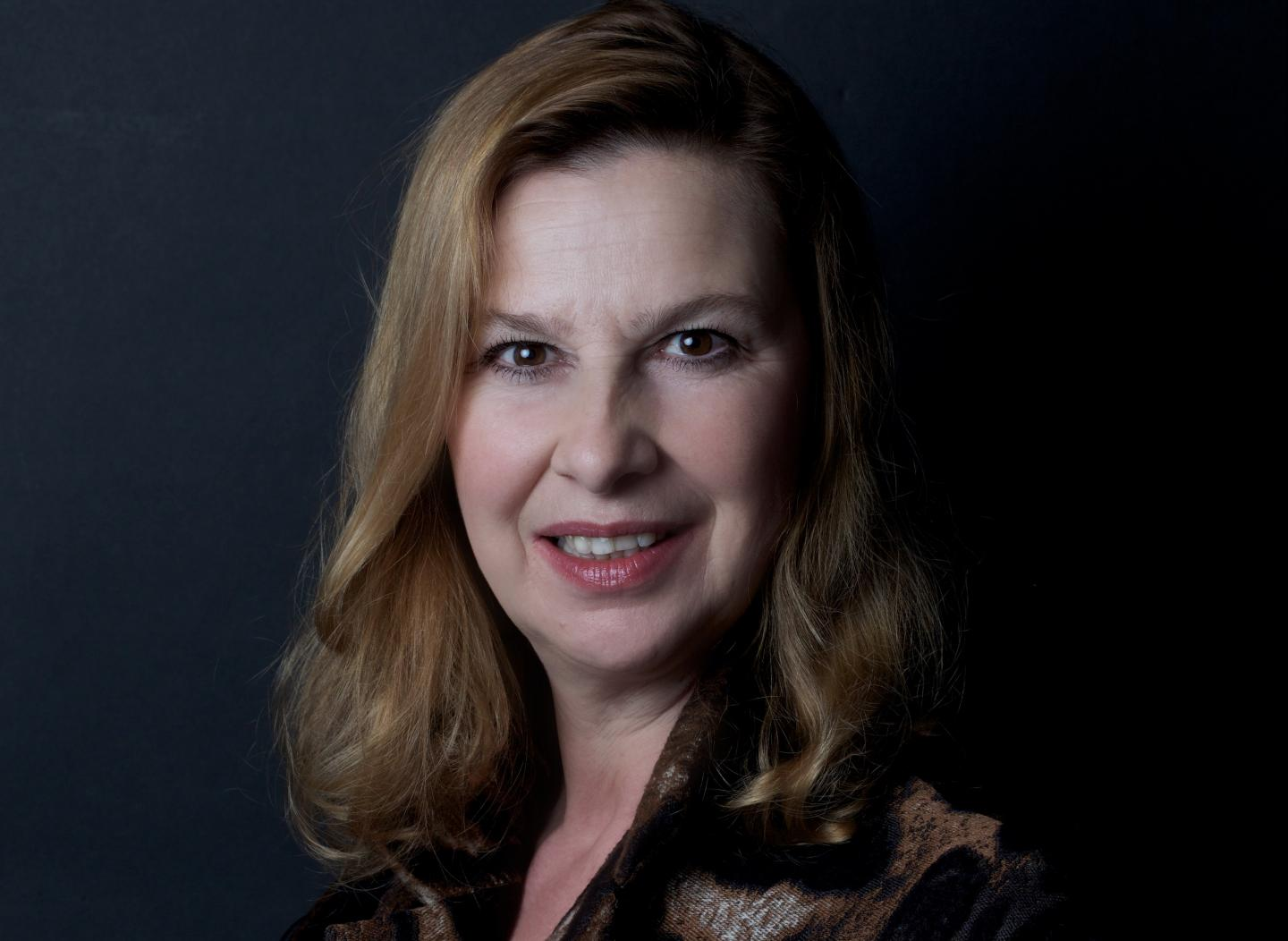
Emmanuelle Polack

Emmanuelle Polack (born Saint-Germain-en-Laye, 1965) is a French art historian and author who investigates provenance of works of art in the Louvre as director of research there.

== Life and career ==
Emmanuelle Polack grew up in Saint-Germain-en-Laye, a western suburb of Paris. Her maternal grandmother perished in the Buchenwald concentration camp, and her paternal grandfather had been held as a prisoner of war by the Nazis.

She studied art history at the University of Paris, then doing master's degree work with Anne Grynberg and with André Kaspi at the Sorbonne. In 1993 she attended the University of Montréal. Between masters and PhD studies, she taught history and geography in a high school.

She worked as a research assistant at the Musée des Monuments français in the department of the Cité de l'Architecture et du Patrimoine, and from 2012 to 2017, at the Institut national d'histoire de l'art (INHA), working on exhibitions and monument conservation and restoration. She leads research into the works of art seized by the Nazis in France during the occupation from 1940 to 1944. She compiled and published the working diaries and inventories of Rose Valland from the Musée du Jeu de Paume from 1940 to 1945. In 2017 Polack curated an exhibition in Paris about the art market during the period of the Vichy regime. From 2015 to 2016, she participated in the team conducting research on the works of art held by the firm of Cornelius Gurlitt, an art dealer closely associated with the Nazi government.

Between 2011 and 2017, Polack wrote her doctoral dissertation under the direction of Philippe Dagen. It was published as a book in 2019.

In 2019, she curated an exhibition at the Mémorial de la Shoah in Paris about the art market during the German occupation of France.

In 2020, she was hired by Jean-Luc Martinez, director of the Musée du Louvre to verify the provenance of objects with a history of transactions that would have occurred between 1933 et 1945.

Polack also writes children’s and young adult books, including one about Sophie Scholl.

== Selected publications ==
- Artisans et paysans du Yiddishland, 1921–1938. Exh. cat. Musée d’art et d’histoire du Judaïsme. Paris: Somogy, 2005.
- (with Catel Muller and Claire Bouilhac) Rose Valland: Capitaine beaux-arts. Comic. Éditions Dupuis, 2009.
- (with Emmanuel Cerisier) Rose Valland, l'espionne du musée du Jeu de Paume. Gulf Stream Éditeur, 2009.
- (with Philippe Dagen) Les carnets de Rose Valland : Le pillage des collections privées d'œuvres d'art en France durant la Seconde Guerre Mondiale. Fage Éditions, 2011.
- Les fresques de l'église Saint-Martin de Vic. Lancosme Éditeur, 2012.
- "Le peintre, la danseuse, le nazi." L'Histoire 386 (avril 2013): 18–19.
- Kako le terrible: d'après un véritable fait divers qui eut lieu au Jardin des plantes de Paris en 1903. Geneva: La Joie de lire, 2013. With Barroux (illustrator) Kako, der Schreckliche. Translated by Babette Blume. Munich: mixtvision Mediengesellschaft, 2015. ISBN 978-3-95854-017-0
- (with Régis Hautière, Francis Laboutique and Pierre Wachs Domnok) Sophie Scholl. Paris: Casterman, 2014.
- “’Ravalage’ at the Hôtel Drouot, or The Art of Obtaining a Clean Provenance for Works Stolen in France During the Second World War.” In: Looters, Smugglers, and Collectors: Provenance Research and the Market. Cologne: Walther König, 2015: pages 35–44. ISBN 978-3-86335-853-2
- "Traces of Matisse’s Odalisque au tambourin during the Second World War." In: Pia Schölnberger; Sabine Loitfellner ed. Bergung von Kulturgut im Nationalsozialismus. Vienna, 2016.
- "Des œuvres de Picasso aux feux des enchères sous l’Occupation." In Picasso et la guerre. Exh. cat. Paris: Gallimard, Musée de l’armée, Musée national Picasso, avril 2019. ISBN 978-2072838507
- Le marché de l'art sous l'Occupation, 1940–1944. Paris: Tallandier, 2019.

== Prizes and awards ==
- Prix Berthe Weill pour la recherche, from the Fondation du Judaïsme Français 21 March 2018.
- Prix de la Fondation Ernest et Claire Heilbronn, 10 March 2020.
- Prix des Arts for Le marché de l’art sous l’Occupation – by the Académie nationale des Sciences, Belles-lettres et Arts de Bordeaux,12 December 2019.
