= Ranne =

Ranne is a surname. Notable people with the surname include:

- G. E. Ranne, French writer
- Lulu Ranne (born 1971), Finnish politician
- Tiina Ranne (born 1994), Finnish ice hockey player
