= Chloé Wary =

French bande dessinée author

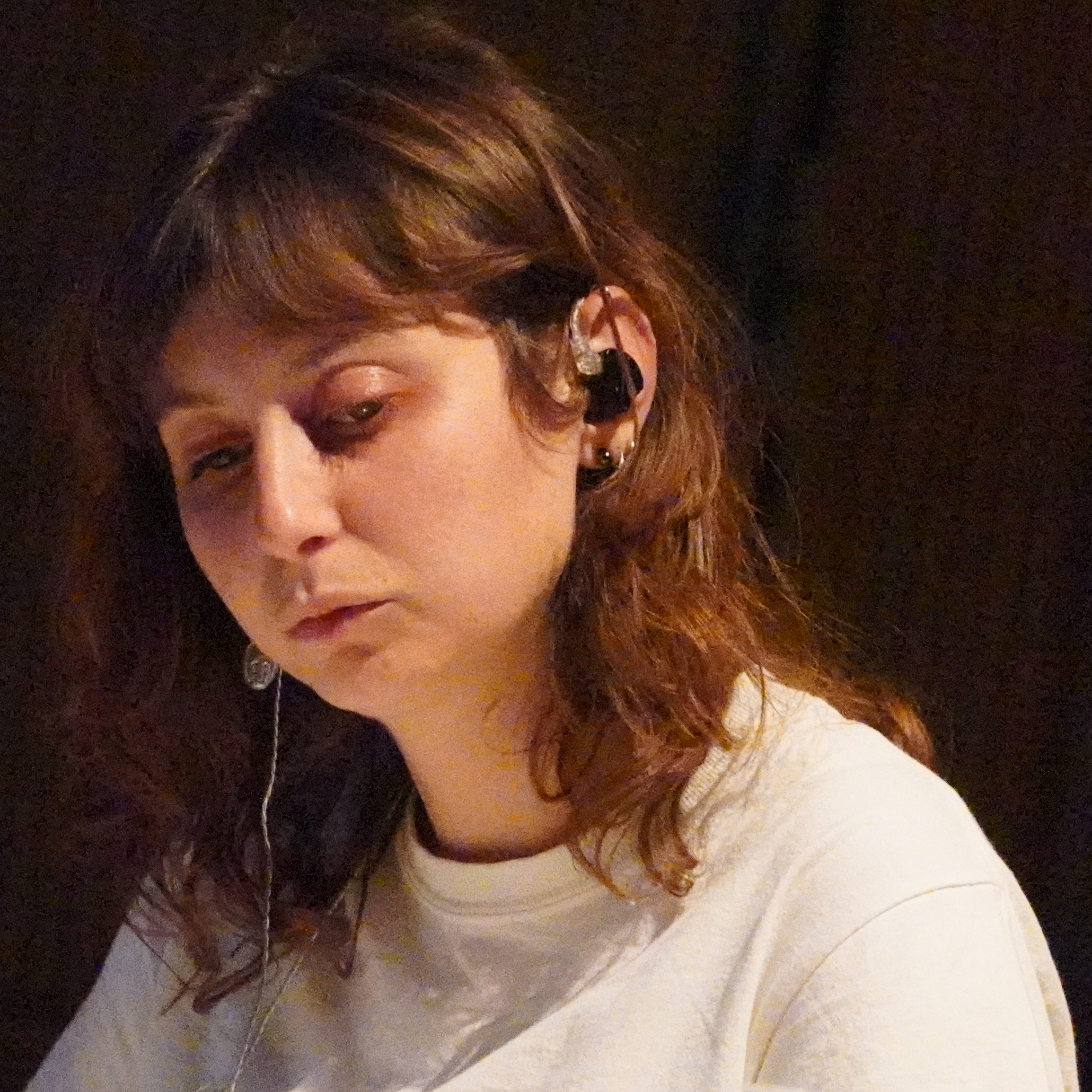
- Chloé Wary (2022 Women Pop Festival)
- Born: 1995 (age 30–31) suburbs of Paris
- Area: Writer
- Notable works: Saison des roses
- Awards: Angoulême International Comics Festival Prize Awarded by the Audience

Chloé Wary (suburbs of Paris, 1995) is a French bande dessinée author. In 2020, she was the recipient of the Angoulême International Comics Festival Prize Awarded by the Audience.

== Early life and education ==
Chloé Wary was born in 1995, and grew up in Chilly-Mazarin. She studied illustration at the Lycée technologique d'Arts appliqués Auguste Renoir, in Paris. She developed a graduation project on women's rights in Saudi Arabia, including the right to drive a vehicle, which was published by Steinkis Groupe in 2017 under the title Conduite interdite (Prohibited Conduct). Wary declared having had the idea for this work by reading a book of testimonies, Révolution sous le voile (Revolution under the veil), by Clarence Rodriguez.

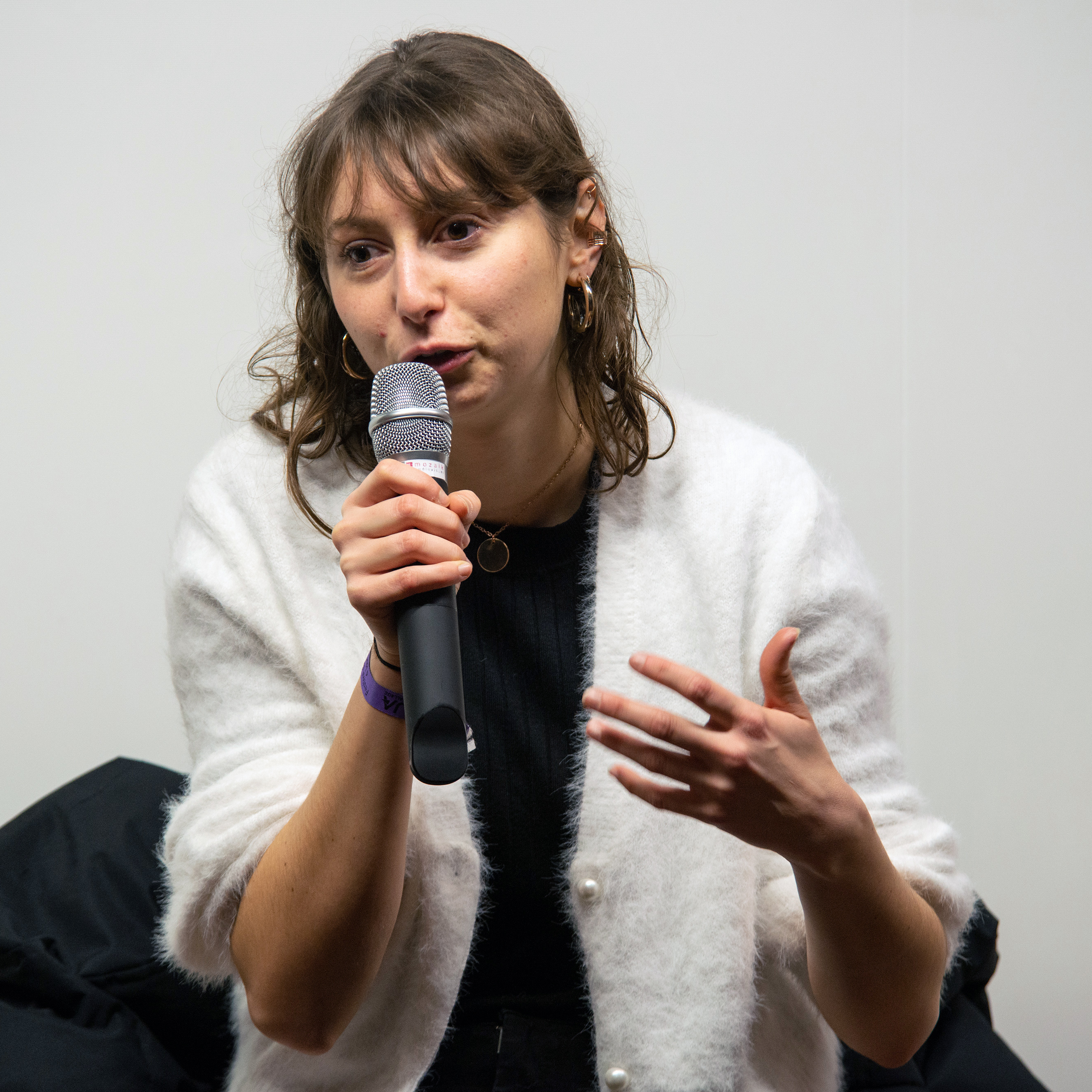
Chloe Wary (2020 Angoulême International Comics Festival)

In 2018, Wary was an artist-in-residence at Mazé-Milon and prepared a comic strip on Women's association football there; she herself became a gamer to better immerse herself in the subject. The work narrates the struggle of a female team for its survival. At the 2020 Angoulême International Comics Festival, the album won the Audience award.

Following an order from Insula Orchestra to the Steinkis publishing house, Wary illustrated a leaflet on the composer Louise Farrenc (1804-1875). This first encounter with classical music led to the production of her third album, Beethov sur Seine.

== Awards and honours ==
- 2020:
  - Literary prize for high school students and apprentices in the South region: winner of Comic strips for Saison des roses
  - Angoulême International Comics Festival Prize Awarded by the Audience for Saison des roses
  - Prix Artémisia for Emancipation for Saison des roses.
  - Nomination for the 2019 Prix Bédélys in the category of best comics outside Quebec in French language for Saison des roses.

== Selected works ==
- Conduite interdite11, Steinkis, March 2017 (ISBN 978-2-368-46090-0)
- Saison des roses, FLBLB, May 2019 (ISBN 978-2-357-61176-4)
- Beethov sur Seine, Steinkis, November 2020 (ISBN 978-2-36846-360-4)
