= Catel Muller =

French comic book artist and illustrator

Catel
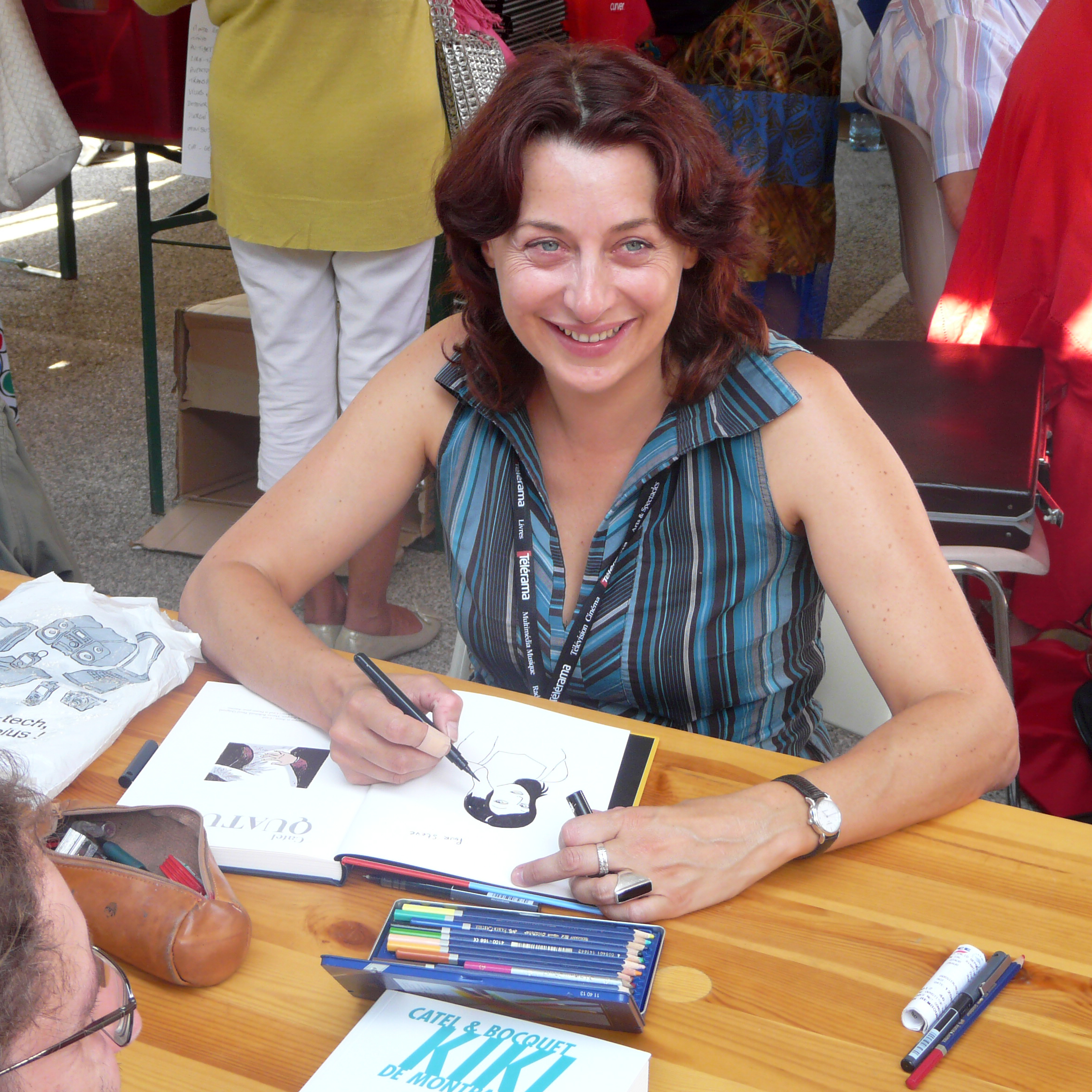
- Born: Catel Muller; August 27, 1964 (age 61); Strasbourg, France
- Occupations: Comics artist and illustrator

Catel Muller (born August 27, 1964), who publishes under the name Catel, is a French comics artists and illustrator.

== Life ==
Muller was born in Strasbourg and received a diploma from the École supérieure des arts décoratifs de Strasbourg.

In 2014, she received the Prix Artémisia for her graphic novel Ainsi soit Benoîte Groult.

In 2015, she published a graphic novel based on the life of actor Mylène Demongeot, Adieu Kharkov.

In 2023, she and Claire Bouilhac adapted George Sand's Indiana into a graphic novel published by Europe Comics.

== Selected work ==
- Lucie s'en soucie, graphic novel (2000), with Véronique Grisseaux. ISBN 2-7316-1410-2
- Le Sang des Valentines, graphic novel (2004), with Christian De Metter, received an Angoulême International Comics Festival Prize
- Kiki de Montparnasse, graphic novel (2007), with José-Louis Bocquet, received the Grand Prix RTL
- Olympe de Gouges, graphic novel (2012), with José-Louis Bocquet, received the Grand Prix littéraire de l'Héroïne Madame Figaro
