= Régis Loisel =

French cartoonist (born 1951)

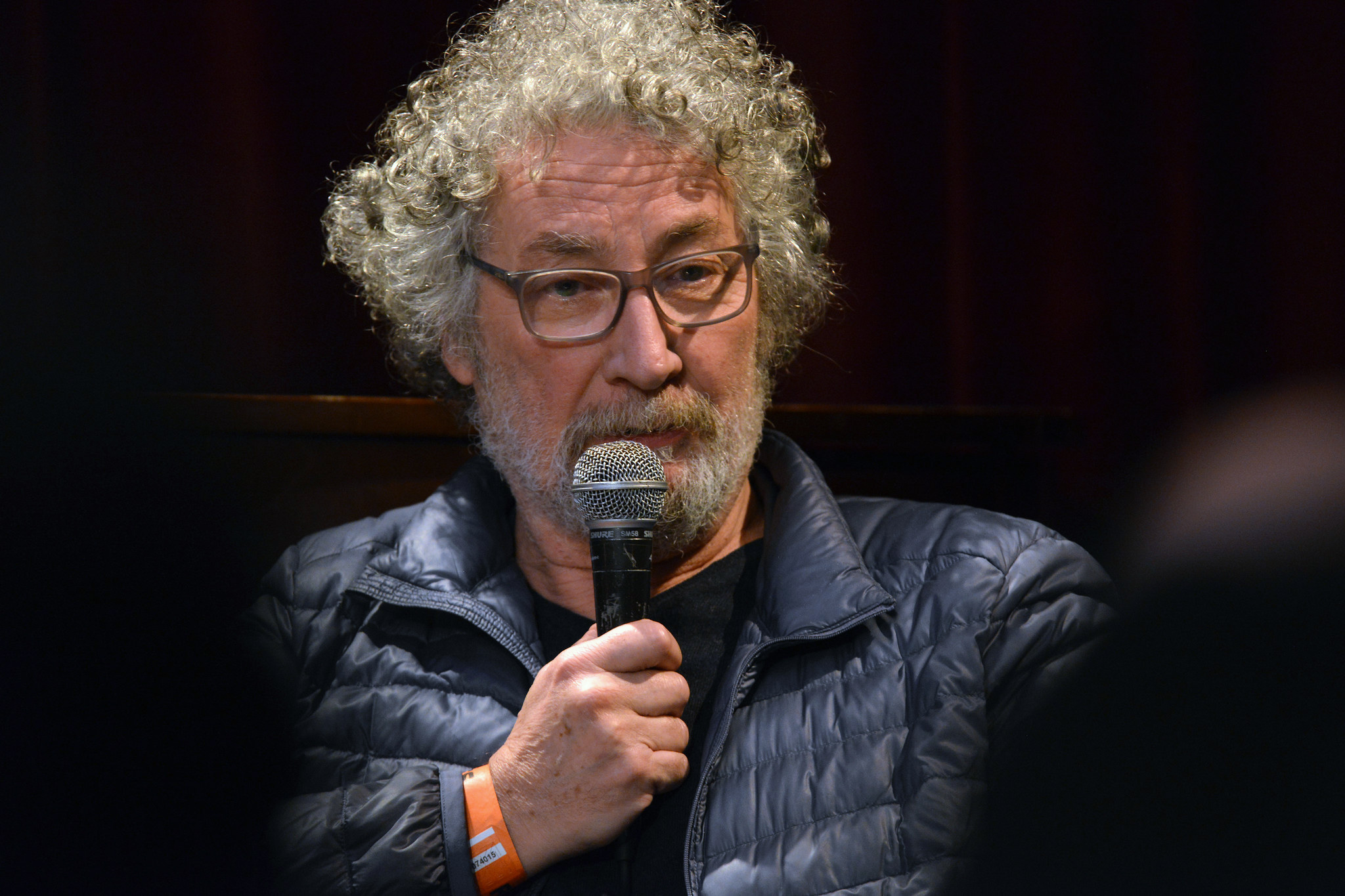
- Born: 4 December 1951 (age 74) Saint-Maixent-l'École, France
- Area: Cartoonist
- Notable works: La Quête de l'oiseau du temps; Peter Pan
- Awards: full list

Régis Loisel (born 4 December 1951) is a French cartoonist, best known for the series La Quête de l'oiseau du temps, written by Serge Le Tendre.

He worked with Walt Disney Studios on the animated films Atlantis and Mulan.

== Bibliography ==
- La Quête de l'oiseau du temps, 4 parts, 1983-1987
- La Dernière goutte..., 1993
- Les Farfelingues, 3 parts, 2001-2004
- Magasin Général, 9 parts, 2006-2014
- Les Nocturnes
- Norbert le lézard, 2004
- L'Offrande
- Peter Pan, 6 parts, 1990-2004
- Pyrénée, 1998
- La Quête de l'oiseau du temps (The Quest for the Time-bird), 8 parts, 1998-2024
- Troubles fêtes, 1989
- Mali Mélo, carnet d'un voyage au Mali, 2000
- "Mickey Mouse: Café Zombo", 2016
- Le grand mort, 8 parts, 2007-2019
- Un putain de salopard, 3 parts, 2019-

== Awards ==
- 1986: Lucien Award at the Angoulême International Comics Festival, France
- 1992: Audience Award at the Angoulême International Comics Festival
- 1995: Audience Award at the Angoulême International Comics Festival
- 2000: nominated for Best German-language Comic for Children and Young People at the Max & Moritz Prizes, Germany
- 2002: nominated for Best German-language Comic for Children and Young People at the Max & Moritz Prizes, Germany
- 2003: nominated for the Audience Award at the Angoulême International Comics Festival
- 2006: Grand Prix de la ville d'Angoulême at the Angoulême International Comics Festival
- 2007: nominated for the Grand Prix, for best French language comic and for best artwork at the Prix Saint-Michel, Brussels

== Resources ==
- Régis Loisel official site
- Régis Loisel biography on Lambiek Comiclopedia
- Régis Loisel at Inducks
