= Jean-Claude Denis =

French comic book writer and artist (born 1951)

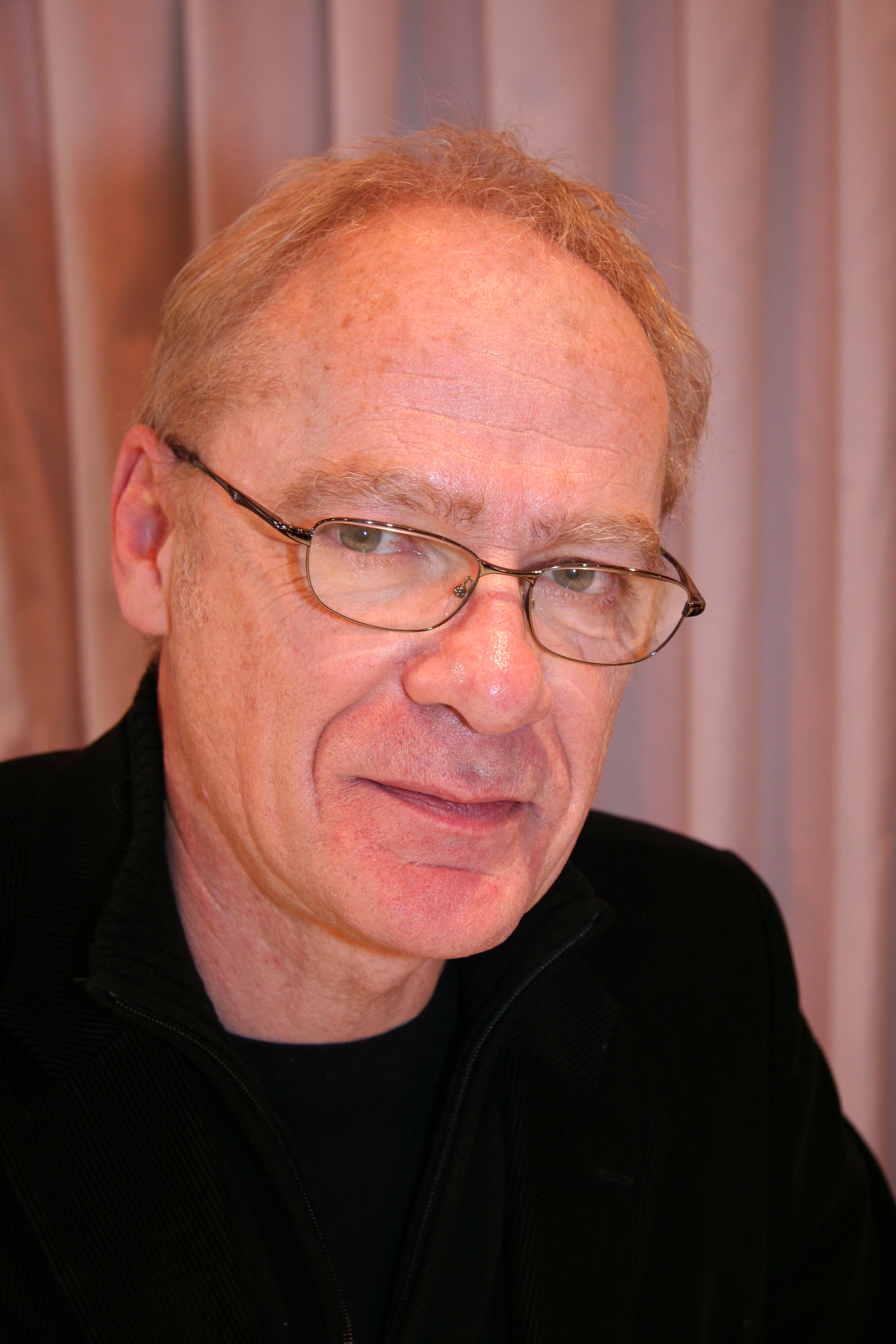
- Born: 1 January 1951 (age 75) Paris, France
- Areas: Writer, Artist
- Notable works: Quelques mois à l’Amélie

Jean-Claude Denis (born 1 January 1951) is a French comic book author. He signs his books frequently as Jean C. Denis or Jean-C. Denis.

== Biography ==
Denis was born in Paris in 1951. In 1971, he was admitted at the École des arts décoratifs de Paris where he met Martin Veyron and André Juillard. He graduated there in visual communication in 1974. He founded afterwards the Groupe Imaginon with his former colleagues Caroline Dillard and Martin Veyron.

Jean-Claude Denis did illustrations for advertising and book covers for the leading French publishing houses. He published his first comic story, André le Corbeau in 1977, for the magazine Pilote and afterwards in album form by Dargaud. He wrote with Martin Veyron a first illustrated children's story, Oncle Ernest et les Ravis, for Casterman in 1978. He then began his solo career in comics with Cours tout nu, published directly by Futuropolis in 1979. Between 1981 and 1983, he made the children's comic Les Aventures de Rup Bonchemin (Casterman).

From 1980 on, for the monthly (À suivre), he published the adventures of Luc Leroi, compiled in a series of albums. In 1982, he drew Les Sept Péchés capitaux for Métal hurlant ; a travel to La Réunion inspired him to draw Bonbon Piment, created together with Jeu des animaux and Maï Pen Raï Raï for Corto in 1988-1989. In parallel, he published L'Ombre aux tableaux for L'Écho des savanes. Also for L'Écho des savanes, he created Le Pélican.In 1995, he published Drôles d'oisifs ; illustrated in 1998 Les Trains de plaisir (coll. « Les Correspondances de Pierre Christin ») and Bande à part, by Jerome Charyn. His comic Quelques mois à l'Amélie was released in 2002, soon followed by the novel Quelques mois à l'Amélie, le manuscrit d'Aloys Clark, on which Jean-Claude Denis , as is often the case, made use of several personal events. In collaboration with Dupuy-Berberian, Denis produced Station Balma-Gramont, later developed under the title Un peu avant la fortune (2008)

Jean-Claude Denis plays the guitar, together with Dupuy et Berberian, in the group Les Hommes du Président, replacing his former band Dennis' Twist, where also played, among others, Philippe Poirier, Dodo, Frank Margerin, Philippe Vuillemin and Denis Sire.

== Comics ==
- 1978 : Oncle Ernest (with Martin Veyron), Casterman
- 1979 : Cours tout nu, Futuropolis.Drugstore Opéra Award of debut album.
- 1980-1984 : André le corbeau, Dargaud
  1. Annie Mal (1980)
  2. La Saison des chaleurs (1980)
  3. La Fuite en avant (1984)
- 1981-2016 : Luc Leroi, Futuropolis then Casterman
  1. Luc Leroi déménage un peu (1981)
  2. Luc Leroi contre les forces du mal (1982)
  3. Luc Leroi remonte la pente (1985)
  4. Le Nain jaune, Audience Prize 1987 at the Festival d’Angoulême (1986)
  5. Des écureuils et des filles (1990)
  6. Bande d'individus (1998)
  7. Toutes les fleurs s’appellent Tiaré (2000)
  8. Plutôt plus tard (2016)
- 2012-2019 : intégrales de Luc Leroi
  - 2012 : Luc Leroi reprend tout à zéro (Luc Leroi omnibus volume), Futuropolis
  - 2016 : L'intégrale, tome 1 : Tout d'abord, 1980-1986, Futuropolis
  - 2017 : L'intégrale, tome 2 : Par la suite, 1986-1990, Futuropolis
  - 2019 : L'intégrale, tome 3 : Finalement, 1998-2016, Futuropolis
- 1981-1983 : Rup Bonchemin, Casterman
  1. Le Chalet perdu (1981)
  2. Entre deux feux (1981)
  3. Gustave Guadeloupe (1983)
- 1983 : Les 7 Péchés capitaux, Les Humanoïdes associés
- 1991 : L’Ombre aux tableaux, Prix des Libraires BD à Blois en 1991, Albin Michel
- 1991 : Bonbon piment, Albin Michel
- 1994 : Le Pélican, Albin Michel
- 1995 : Drôles d'oisifs ou le Dernier des La Houpe, Albin Michel
- 1998 : Un artiste chat (children's book)
- 2000 : Tête de mule (children's book)
- 2002 : Quelques mois à l’Amélie, éditions Dupuis, coll. « Aire libre »,, Prix du dialogue et de l’écriture in 2003 at the Festival d’Angoulême
- 2004 : La Beauté à domicile, Dupuis, coll. « Aire libre »
- 2006 : Le Sommeil de Leo, Futuropolis
- 2008 : Un peu avant la fortune (avec Dupuy et Berberian), Dupuis
- 2009 : Nouvelles du monde invisible, Futuropolis
- 2010-2011 : Tous à Matha !, Futuropolis

Tome 1 (2010)
Tome 2 (2011)
Intégrale (2012) ISBN 978-2-7548-0828-6

- 2012 : Zone Blanche, Futuropolis
- 2018 : La Terreur des hauteurs, Futuropolis
- 2021 : Reliefs de l'ancien monde, Futuropolis
- 2023 : Luc Leroi : Un effet d'aubaine, Futuropolis

== Illustrations ==
- Les Rameaux de Jericho, watercolors, text by ’Ibrahim Souss (1994)
- Numéros de cabines (2002)
- Belém un mirage à l’envers (2005)
- 2015 : Le Dessein d'Ela,collective work by 12 illustrators ans 12 writers for Éditions Gallimard

== Other ==
- 1991 : Le Cri des Sirènes (pastels, texts and music, CD book , Seuil Jeunesse.
- 1995 : Il était une fois…, adaptation of La Bergère et le Ramoneur en animation.
- 2002 : Quelques mois à l'Amélie, le manuscrit d'Aloys Clark, novel, PLG, ISBN 978-2-9515578-4-0
- 2005 : Harry Belafonte : Calypsos, CD and illustrations, Nocturne, coll. « BDVoices ».
- 2012 : Dust Bowl,with Charles Berberian, CD and illustrations, Nocturne, coll. « BDMusic ».
- 2013 : The Spell Nightbuzz (with Charles Berberian), CD and illustrations, Nocturne, coll. « BDMusic ».
- 2017 : Chuck Berry - Is it you ?, CD and illustrations, Nocturne, coll. « BDRock ».

== Honors ==
=== Distinctions ===
- 2007 : Chevalier de l'ordre des Arts et des Lettres.

=== Awards ===
- 1979 : prix du Drugstore Opéra of best debut album Cours tout nu ;
- 1987 : prix Lucien off-festival d'Angoulême for Luc Leroi, t. 4 : Le Nain jaune ;
- 1992 : prix des libraires de bande dessinée for L'Ombre aux tableaux ;
- 2003 : Prix du dialogue et de l’écriture at the Festival d’Angoulême ;
- 2007 : Prix « Grand Boum-Ville de Blois » lifetime achievement award issued in 2007 by the festival bd BOUM, ;
- 2012 : Grand prix de la ville d'Angoulême;
- Retrospective exhibition at the Festival d'Angoulême 2013.

== Sources ==
- Gaumer, Patrick (2010). "Denis, Jean-C.". Dictionnaire mondial de la BD. Paris: Larousse. pp. 243–244. ISBN 978-2-03-584331-9.
- Denis, Jean-Claude (December 1979). "Entretien avec Jean-Claude Denis". Schtroumpfanzine. No. 36. p. 3-8..
- Denis, Jean-Claude; Bogrow, Sophie (June 2015). "Denis se met au vert solitaire". Casemate. No. 82. p. 10-14.
