= Claire Bouilhac =

French cartoonist

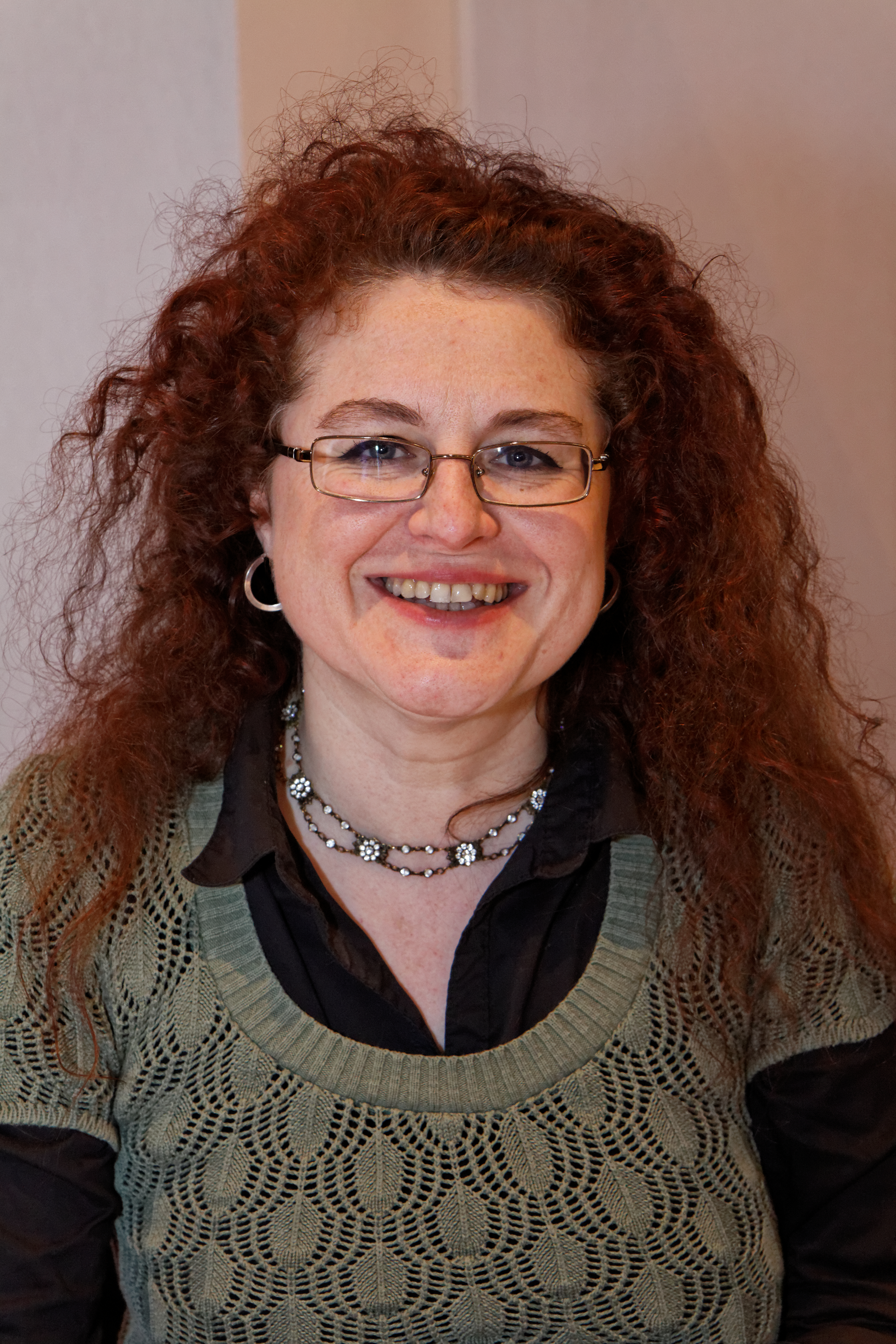
- (2012)
- Born: 1970 (age 55–56)
- Notable work: Francis Blaireau Farceur
- Awards: Prix Schlingo (2022)
- Website: www.clairebouilhac.com

Claire Bouilhac (born 1970) is a French bande dessinée illustrator, scriptwriter, and colorist, working in particular for Spirou and Fluide Glacial. She mainly draws the series Maude Mutante, Francis Blaireau Farceur, and Melody Bondage. She is a 2022 laureate of the Prix Schlingo.

== Biography ==
Claire Bouilhac was born in 1970. From 1994, she teamed up with scriptwriter Jake Raynal for the series Francis Blaireau Farceur, which has seven volumes and a special issue. In 2016, adapting the Francis series, the Victor B. company organized the show Francis sauve le monde (Francis saves the world) at the Théâtre de Namur, featuring 30 of the 240 short stories.

Bouilhac has collaborated with Catel Muller on several occasions; the two met on the sidelines of the Angoulême International Comics Festival and found affinities, particularly in terms of feminism. They collaborated on the Top Linotte series and on two biographies: Rose Valland, captain Beaux-Arts (2009) and another on Mylène Demongeot, Adieu Kharkov (2015), with preface by Pierre Richard. The two authors begin their work with Les lilas de Kharkov but, after lengthy interviews with the actress, they retraced her life and that of her mother, Claudia. The realization of the album took three years, from period photos. In the wake of this work, an exhibition on this graphic novel was held at Château-Gontier.

In 2019, she collaborated with Catel Muller on a comic book adaptation of La Princesse de Clèves.

Then in 2023, Bouilhac and Muller adapted George Sand's Indiana into a graphic novel published by Europe Comics.

== Awards and honours ==
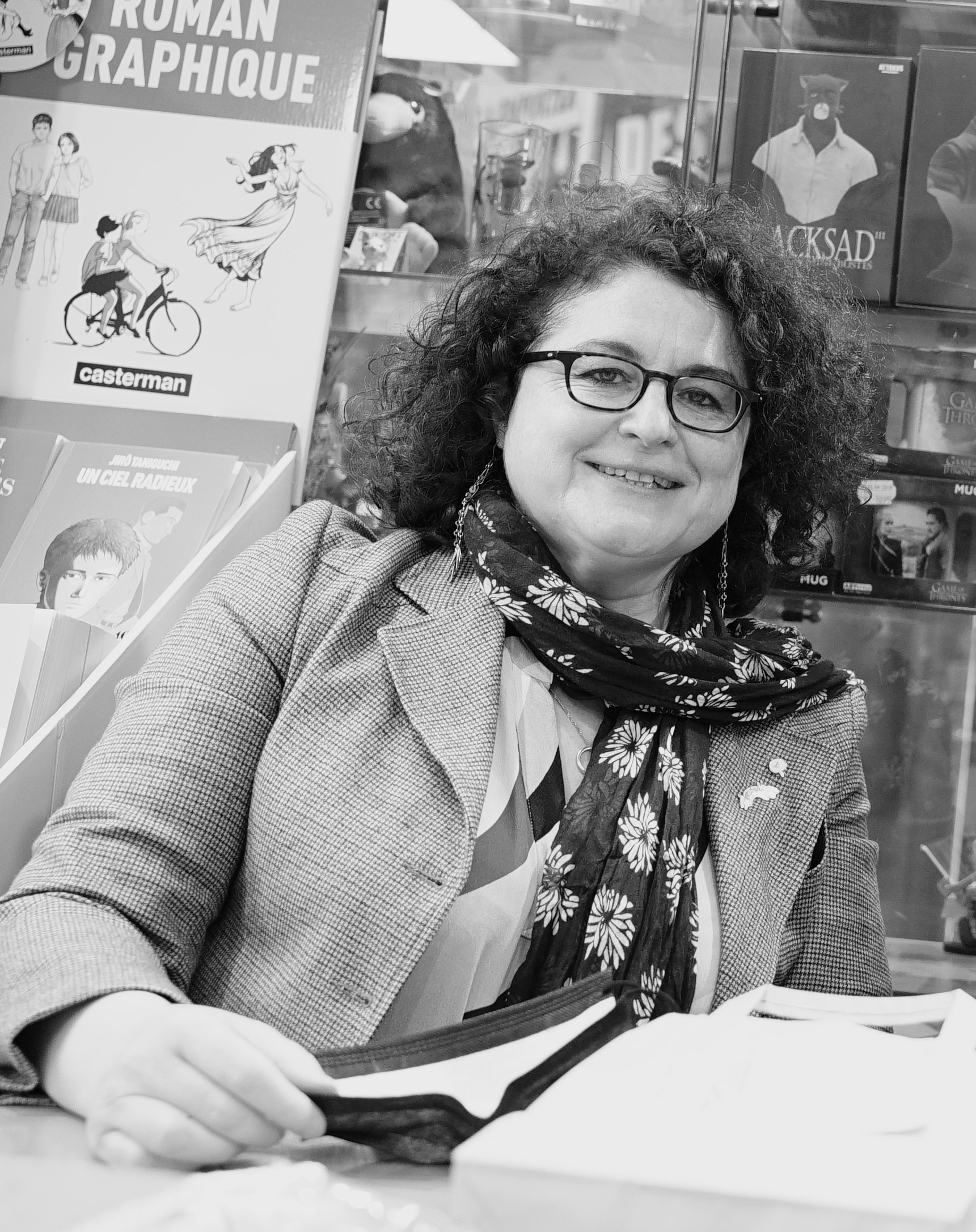
(2021)

- 2022, Prix Schlingo (with Yves Poinot)

== Selected works ==
=== Series ===
==== Francis Blaireau Farceur ====
- No. 1 Francis blaireau farceur, scriptwriter, Jake Raynal, designer, Claire Bouilhac, coloring, B&W, 1994, Cornélius "Delphine" ISBN 2-909990-06-0
- No. 2 Francis veut mourir (scriptwriter, Jake Raynal; designer, Claire Bouilhac; coloring), B&W, 1996, Cornélius coll. "Delphine" ISBN 2-909990-10-9
- No. 3 Francis cherche l'amour (scriptwriter, Jake Raynal; designer, Claire Bouilhac; colorist, B&W), 1997, Cornélius coll. "Delphine" ISBN 2-909990-39-7
- No. 4 Francis sauve le mond (scriptwriter, Jake Raynal; designer, Claire Bouilhac; colorist, B&W), 2005, Cornélius coll. "Delphine" ISBN 2-915492-04-2
- No. 5 Francis rate sa vie (scriptwriter, Jake Raynal; designer, Claire Bouilhac; colorist, B&W), 2009, Cornélius coll. "Delphine" ISBN 978-2-915492-68-2
- No. 6 Francis est malade (scriptwriter, Jake Raynal; designer, Claire Bouilhac; coloring, B&W), 2013, Cornélius coll. "Delphine" ISBN 978-2-360-81065-9
- No. 7 Francis est papa (scriptwriter, Jake Raynal; designer, Claire Bouilhac; colorist, B&W), 2017, Cornélius coll. "Delphine" ISBN 978-2-360-81134-2
- Special edition, Francis (scriptwriter, Jake Raynal; designer, Claire Bouilhac; colorist, B&W), 2013, Cornélius coll. "Delphine" ISBN 978-2-360-81069-7

==== Top Linotte ====
- No. 2 Trop Pimpon (scriptwriter, Catel and Claire Bouilhac; designer, Catel; colorist, Nathalie Plee), 2012, Dupuis ISBN 978-2-8001-4963-9
- No. 3 Trop classe (scriptwriters and designers, Catel and Claire Bouilhac; colorist, Claire Bouilhac and Nathalie Plee) 2013, Dupuis ISBN 978-2-8001-5991-1

=== One-shots ===
- Melody Bondage : My name is bondage (scriptwriter, Jake Raynal; designer and colorist, Claire Bouilhac), 2003, Audie ISBN 2-85815-377-9
- Rose Valland, capitaine Beaux-Arts (scriptwriters, Claire Bouilhac and Emmanuelle Polack; designer, Catel; colorist, Claire Champeval, 2009, Dupuis ISBN 978-2-8001-4552-5
- Adieu Kharkov (scriptwriters, Mylène Demongeot and Claire Bouilhac; designers, Catel and Claire Bouilhac; colorist, Claire Bouilhac, Marie-Anne Didierjean, and Meephe Versaevel, 2015, Dupuis Coll. "Aire Libre" ISBN 978-2-8001-5375-9

=== Collectives ===
- Cornélius ou l'art de la mouscaille et du pinaillage, Cornélius, coll. "Gilbet", 2007 ISBN 978-2-915492-38-5
- En chemin elle rencontre... 2. Les artistes se mobilisent pour le respect des droits des femmes, Des Ronds Dans L'O / Amnesty International, 2011 ISBN 978-2-917237-15-1
- Hommage à Bécassine, Gautier-Languereau, 2016 ISBN 978-2-01-460171-8
- Raymond Devos, Jungle ! / Plon, 2017 ISBN 978-2-8222-2165-8
