= Tu mourras moins bête... (comics) =

French comic series

Publication information
- Publisher: Ankama Éditions; Delcourt
- Publication date: 2008

Creative team
- Written by: Marion Montaigne

Tu mourras moins bête... (mais tu mourras quand-même) (You'll die less stupid ... but you'll die anyway) is a humorous online comic strip by Marion Montaigne broadcast since 2008. The series is published as albums by Ankama Éditions from 2011 and Delcourt in 2014. In 2016, the comic strip was adapted into an animated series broadcast on the Arte channel.

== Synopsis ==
Through the characters of Professor Moustache and his assistant Nathanael, the series humorously answers the scientific questions that fake readers send by postcard, while trying to be as scientifically rigorous as possible. Each article is accompanied by a bibliography detailing the sources that inspired the author. The demonstrations are punctuated with nods to popular culture (The Lord of the Rings, Terminator, Back to the Future, CSI: Crime Scene Investigation, etc.) or to various public figures (Bogdanov brothers, David Hasselhoff, Bernard Henri-Lévy, etc.). Marion Montaigne is often invited by scientists, some of her articles are reports of visits to institutions: the Paris Observatory, the University of Jussieu, the CNES.

== Adaption ==
An animated series adapted from the comic strip, produced by Agat Films & Cie - Ex Nihilo and Folimage, has been broadcast on the Franco-German television channel Arte since January 2016. Season 1 containing 30 episodes and season 2 containing 40 episodes were directed by Amandine Fredon. A season 3 is in progress. François Morel lends his voice to Professor Moustache, and Jérôme Pauwels to Nathanaëlle.

== Awards ==
- 2011: Prix du Margouillat.
- 2013: Angoulême International Comics Festival Prize Awarded by the Audience at the 2013 Angoulême International Comics Festival.
- Professor Moustache spreads his science! : Official selection of the 2016 Angoulême International Comics Festival.
