= Pachamba =

Township in Jharkhand, India

Pachamba is an ancient location in Giridih, in the Jharkhand state, India.

Location: Latitude: 24° 12′ N, Longitude: 86° 16′ E.

The term "Pachamba" means five ("pach") mangoes ("amba"), implying that there was a cluster of five mango trees where the township grew up. Prior to the establishment of Giridih as a major town of the region, Pachamba was the main attraction for the rural dwellers for market related activities.

== History ==
Pachamba has one of the oldest churches of Eastern India. The church is called the Stevenson Memorial Church. In 1871, Rev. (Dr.) Archibald Templeton, M.D., came to Pachamba to serve these tribal areas under the “Santal Mission of the Free Church of Scotland”. This mission also set up the first hospital in Pachamba. The church was named after one of the mission doctors, William Henderson Stevenson, who died of fever.

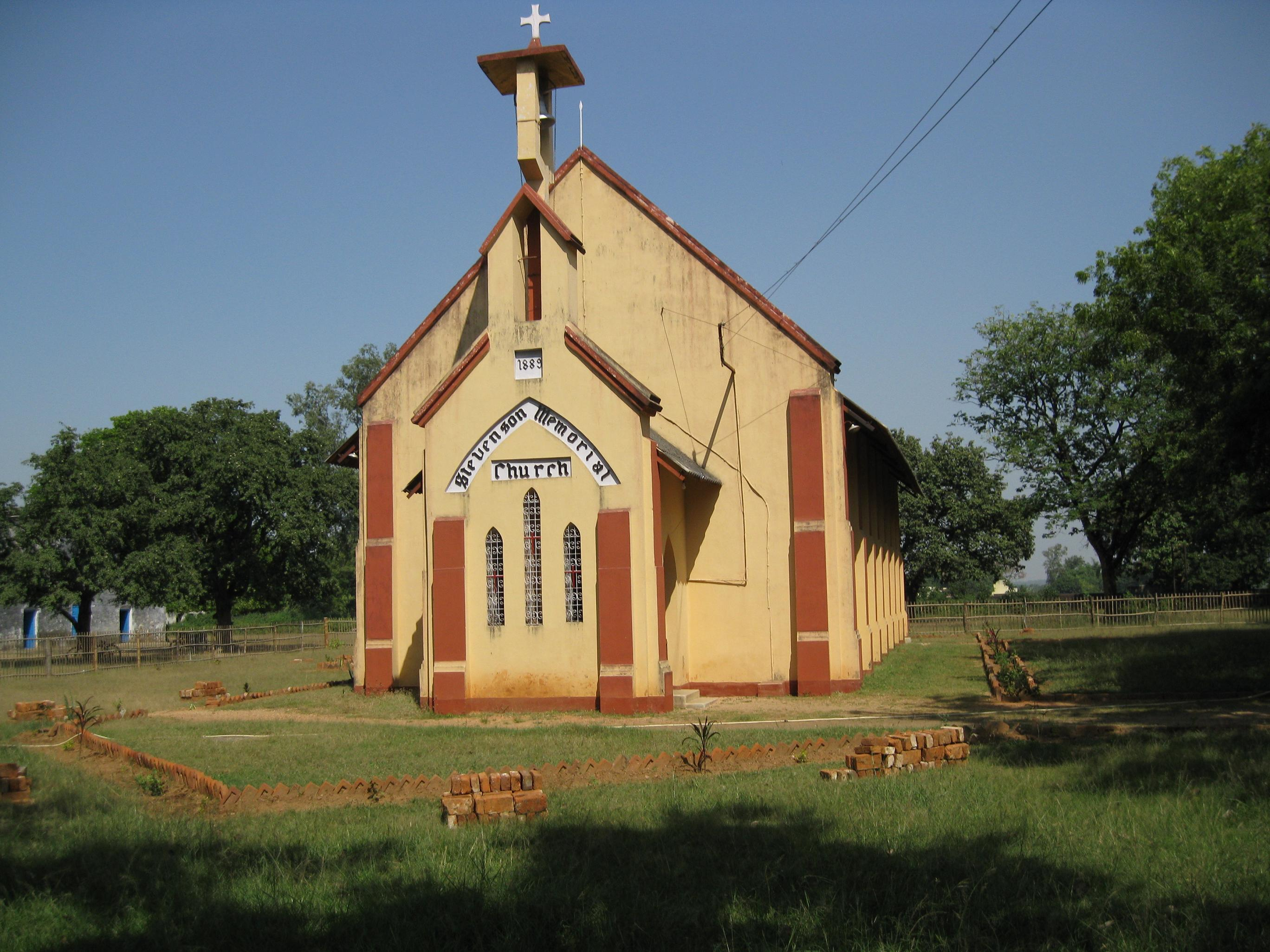
Stevenson Memorial Church, Pachamba

From the late 19th century till mid-20th century, Pachamba was home to mica related activities, with a number of mica-trading and exporting business houses located there, including the business house, which became famous as Mica Kings during the period between the First World War and the Second World War.

During the British Raj, Pachamba was ruled by the local landlord, called "Tikait".

Pachamba is also known for a small temple dedicated to Goddess Kali, called "Kali Manda". Worship in the shrine is popularly held only on Tuesdays and Saturdays. Incidentally, there is also another Kali Manda located about a kilometre away, which is the hub of the main Durga Puja celebrations in the town.

Pachamba also has a temple complex comprising Lord Shiva-Parvati and Lord Hanuman, constructed in Diwantola by the then dewan "Khagpati Lal". It is a centre point of many devotees during Durga Puja and Mahashivaratri and other events viz marriages etc. The first MP of the district, Late Nageshwar Prasad Sinha used to stay here (at 'Bhawani Bhawan' right in front of this temple). His ancestral house is still located there and is taken care of by his sons, majorly by Ramesh Kumar Sinha.

There is one big lake in Pachamba known as "Burhwa Aahra (बुढ़वा अहरा)", which is now losing its essence due to rising pollution and illegal encroachment. People perform Chhath Pooja festival and many other religious rituals here. Also there is a temple complex known as "Narbada dham" dedicated to Lord Shiva, Goddess Parvati & Annapurna Devi and other god and goddess temple are also here in the campus. People mostly visit on Monday for puja-archana; marriages also took place here with the permission of Mr Bagaria. The complex has a small lake and two "kundh" water tank. On "Shivratri" the people offer "Ghota Prasad" to Lord Shiva and Prasad is distributed within the peoples. During the month of "savan", special puja is done here for lord shiva. There is a House of Cows Namely Sri Gopal Gaushala, where thousands of cows has been feed and kept, which produce Milk for Entire Pachamba Area. There is also an Old Bus Depot during British Raj which was omitted now and shifted to Bus Stand Giridih.

== Transportation ==
There is a railway station in Pachamba Namely Salaia railway station on Madhupur–Giridih–Koderma line. A very old post office is situated at near High School Pachamba.
