= Van Hamme =

Van Hamme or van Hamme is a Dutch-language surname. Notable people with the surname include:

- Alexis Van Hamme (1818–1875), Belgian painter
- Jean Van Hamme (born 1939), Belgian writer
- Joost van Hamme (1629/30 - after 1657), Flemish painter
- Thomas Van Hamme (born 1969), Belgian television presenter
- Victor Van Hamme (1897–?), Belgian weightlifter
