= Martin Veyron =

French comic book author and novelist

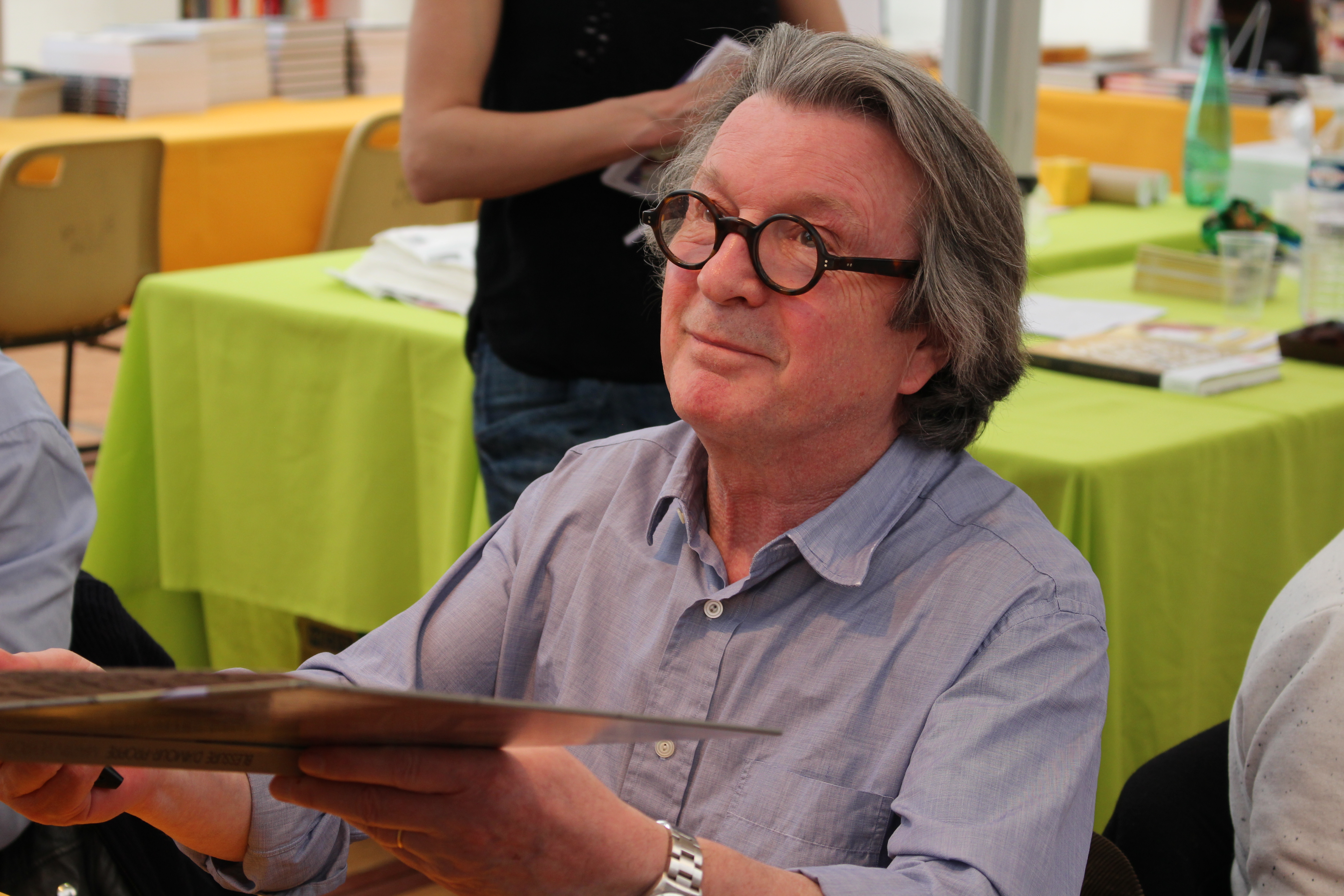
- Martin Veyron in April 2016
- Born: 27 March 1950 (age 76); Dax, Landes, France
- Education: Collège Stanislas de Paris
- Occupations: Comic book author; novelist
- Spouse: Anne Chabrol
- Children: 2 sons

Martin Veyron (born 27 March 1950 in Dax, Landes, France) is a French comic book author and novelist, best known for his graphic novels and editorial cartoons. His style combines disenchanted vaudeville and scathing studies of mores in the manner of Gérard Lauzier.

== Career ==
Veyron graduated from the Collège Stanislas de Paris. In 1975, he founded the Imaginon studio with Jean-Claude Denis and Caroline Dillard. He published his first illustrations in Lui, L'Expansion, and Cosmopolitan.

His first comics date from 1977, when he wrote Edmond le cochon (drawn by Jean-Marc Rochette) for L'Écho des savanes. He wrote Raoul et Remy for Pilote in 1978 and Olivier Désmoreaux (under the pseudonym Richard de Muzillac) in 1984. His works were published by Éditions du Fromage at Casterman and Éditions Albin Michel. Many of his cartoons were published in newspapers such as Libération, Paris Match, L'Obs, and L'Événement du jeudi.

In 1985 he made a film from his humorous erotic graphic novel L'Amour propre. He published his first novel, Tremolo Corazon, in 1996.

Veyron received the Grand Prix of Angoulême International Comics Festival in 2001 and presided the jury in 2002.

== Personal life ==
He is married to Anne Chabrol, a former reporter from the war in Northern Ireland and a former director of magazines Elle, Glamour and Cosmopolitan. He has two sons.

== Works ==
=== Comics ===
- Oncle Ernest, with Jean-Claude Denis, Casterman, 1978
- Bernard Lermite
- Bernard Lermite Éditions du Fromage, 1979
- Plus lourd que l'air, Éditions du Fromage, 1979
- Personnellement je ne veux pas d'enfants (mais les miens feront ce qu'ils voudront), Éditions du Fromage, 1980
- L'éternel féminin dure, Éditions du Fromage, 1981
- Ce n'est plus le peuple qui gronde mais le public qui réagit (Dargaud, 1982
- Peut-on fumer après la mort ?, Albin Michel, 1988
- Le pagure est connu, Albin Michel, 1993
- Edmond le cochon, scénario de Martin Veyron, dessin de Jean-Marc Rochette
- Edmond le cochon, Éditions du Fromage, 1980
- Edmond le cochon va en Afrique, Éditions du Fromage, 1981
- Le continent mystérieux, Albin Michel, 1983
- Le mystère continental, Albin Michel, 1993
- L'Amour propre (ne le reste jamais très longtemps), Albin Michel, 1983
- Zodiaque, collective album with Arno, Caro, Caza, Yves Chaland/Doug Headline, Cheraqui, Luc Cornillon, Michel Crespin, Dodo/Ben Radis, Jean-Claude Gal, Paul Gillon, Dominique Hé, Kent Hutchinson, Chantal Montellier, Hugo Pratt, Martin Veyron, Al Voss/Angelfred, coll. « Pied jaloux », Les Humanoïdes Associés, 1983)
- Olivier Désormeaux – Âge ?... Moyen !, written by Martin Veyron, drawn by Diego de Soria, Dargaud, 1984
- Executive Woman, Albin Michel, 1986
- Bêtes, sales et mal élevés, Futuropolis, 1987
- Donc, Jean..., Albin Michel, 1990
- Jivara, Albin Michel, 1992
- Cru bourgeois, Albin Michel, 1998
- Caca rente, Albin Michel, 2000
- Trois d'entre elles, Albin Michel, 2004
- Cour Royale, with Jean-Marc Rochette, 2005
- Papy Plouf, Albin Michel, 2006
- Blessure d'amour propre, Dargaud, 2009
- Ce qu'il faut de terre à l'homme, Dargaud, 2016 - Official selected Angoulême International Comics Festival in 2017

=== Drawing works ===
- Un nègre blanc le cul entre deux chaises, Futuropolis, 1980
- Vite !, Albin Michel, 1988
- Politiquement incorrect, Hoëbeke, 1995
- (sic), Albin Michel, 2001

=== Published art albums ===
- La fin du chèque (Crédit Agricole, 1983)
- Le cahier (Clairefontaine, 1987)
- Titre ? de transport (Semvat, 1992)

== Film ==
- L'Amour propre ne le reste jamais très longtemps (1985)
