= Phulwaria =

- Census town
- Location in Uttar Pradesh, India
- Coordinates: 25°19′43.9″N 82°57′41.3″E
- Country: India
- State: Uttar Pradesh
- District: Varanasi

Population (2011)
  - Total: 21,732

Languages
  - Official: Hindi
- Time zone: UTC+5:30 (IST)

Phulwaria is a census town in Varanasi district in the Indian state of Uttar Pradesh.Falwaria surname comes under Rajput community

== Demographics ==
As of 2001 India census, Phulwaria had a population of 11,732. Males constitute 54% of the population and females 46%. Phulwaria has an average literacy rate of 66%, higher than the national average of 59.5%: male literacy is 75%, and female literacy is 55%. In Phulwaria, 13% of the population is under 6 years of age.

== Some Facts ==
Phulwaria is situated on the bank of river Varuna which is a tributary of river Ganga.
