= Sad-e Vaqas =

Sad-e Vaqas سعدوقاص
- Village
- Location within Iran
- Coordinates: 34°16′43″N 48°14′24″E
- Country: Iran
- Province: Hamadan
- County: Nahavand
- Bakhsh: Central
- Rural District: Tariq ol Eslam

Population (2006)
  - Total: 727
- Time zone: UTC+3:30 (IRST)
  - Summer (DST): UTC+4:30 (IRDT)

Sad-e Vaqas (Persian: سعدوقاص, also Romanized as Sa‘d-e Vaqāş; also known as Fīrūzān, Goosheh Sa‘d Vaghas, Gūsheh Sa‘d Vaqqās, Gūsheh-ye Sa‘d-e Vaqāş, Gūsheh-ye Sa‘d-e Vaqqāş, Salgās, and Sulgās) is a village in Tariq ol Eslam Rural District, in the Central District of Nahavand County, Hamadan Province, Iran. At the 2006 census, its population was 727, in 171 families.
