= Harna =

Harna هارنا
- Village
- Location within Iran
- Coordinates: 39°06′44″N 47°25′56″E
- Country: Iran
- Province: East Azerbaijan
- County: Kaleybar
- Bakhsh: Abish Ahmad
- Rural District: Abish Ahmad

Population (2006)
  - Total: 166
- Time zone: UTC+3:30 (IRST)
  - Summer (DST): UTC+4:30 (IRDT)

Harna (Persian: هارنا, also Romanized as Hārnā; also known as Qeshlāq-e Hārnā) is a village in Abish Ahmad Rural District, Abish Ahmad District, Kaleybar County, East Azerbaijan Province, Iran. At the 2006 census, its population was 166, in 29 families.
