= La Quête de l'oiseau du temps =

Comic book series

La Quête de l'oiseau du temps (The Quest for the Time-Bird) is a French language fantasy comic series written by Serge Le Tendre and drawn by Régis Loisel (1st cycle) and others (2nd cycle), published by Dargaud since 1983.

== Plot overview ==
The world of Akbar is in danger. In ancient times, one of the gods, Ramor, rebelled against his peers, but was defeated and imprisoned inside a conch. But over the millennia which have passed since that day, the magic has weakened, threatening to unleash Ramor upon the world once more. The sorcerer-princess Mara has found a way to prevent the god's resurrection and to bind him again to his prison. To succeed during the incantation, however, she needs the legendary Time-Bird, a mythical beast able to control the flow of time. Mara sends her daughter, Pelisse to a past lover, Bragon, once a fearsome warrior, now a gray-haired lord of the manor, to convince the aging hero to embark on one last adventure in order to save the world of Akbar.

== Cast of characters ==
=== Protagonists ===
Bragon
A widely-traveled, axe-wielding knight who started his life as a dissatisfied farmer's son gripped by wanderlust. After encountering Javin, he began to travel Akbar, longing to prove himself worthy of his life's love, Sorcerer-Princess Mara. At the beginning of the original series, Bragon has retired to an estate until Sorceress-Princess Mara, his former lover, and her daughter Pelisse beseech him to take up the quest to rescue Akbar. He at first does not take an immediate liking to Pelisse, whose stubbornness matches his own, but in the course of the story he begins to accept and love her as his daughter. This proves to be his undoing when her true nature is revealed, and with her disappearance he descends into madness, believing that Pelisse is still with him.
Pelisse
Ostensibly the daughter of Bragon and Mara, she is actually an illusion given a semi-real existence by Mara in order to give Bragon an enticement for undertaking the quest for the Time Bird. She has been fitted with the personality traits of her father, making her extremely stubborn, yet smart, compassionate, and loyal to her friends. In the course of the series, she even acquires a sentience of her own; but when Mara dies, her spell is broken, and Pelisse dissipates into nothingness. Throughout the series, she uses her mother's Fiery Whip, created from the tongue of a Borak, as her principal weapon.
In the first English translation of the series by NBM, Pelisse was renamed Roxanne.
Furry (Le Fourreux)
A small, blue-furred animal who appears to be Pelisse's pet. In actuality, it is the living focus of the spell which maintains her illusionary existence.
The Stranger (L'inconnu)
The man called Stranger was originally Touret, one of Bragon's farmhands who begins lusting after Pelisse when she comes to ask her "father" to search for the Time Bird. Pelisse catches Touret peering down her cleavage, prompting her to slap him; Touret follows her, determined to get back at her. However, just before catching up with her in Ir-Weig, the city of Sorcerer-Prince Shan-Tung, he is captured by Bulrog's Llir mercenaries. Escaping and overpowering one of the Llir, he takes his uniform - complete with a face-hiding helmet - to disguise his identity and get Pelisse; but instead he ends up aiding her and Bragon in retrieving Ramor's conch, and subsequently joins them on their quest. For most of the Quest series, he plays the role of the cowardly, self-centered comic relief, but in the final episode he begins to demonstrate wisdom and plays a vital role in the resolution of the story. After Mara's demise, he assumes rulership over Kiskill's people.
Bulrog
Bragon's former student, whose face was disfigured by a wild Borak monster, forcing him to wear a mask. After leaving Bragon, he became a mercenary and member, and later the leader, of the Llir Warriors. After Bragon kills his employer, Shan-Tung, and decimates the Llir, Bulrog swears revenge on him and pursues his troupe on their further quest; but later he experiences a change of heart and, looking for a new sense in life, begins to aid Bragon instead. During their journey back to Mara, when the company is delayed in Tharmine's domain, he is infected with a deadly disease, forcing Bragon to amputate his arm. Bulrog also voluntarily stays behind to partake in the accumulated knowledge he discovers in the Sorcerer-Prince's library, finally finding a sense of purpose. At the end of the Quest series, he is confirmed to be still alive and in frequent contact with the Stranger.

=== Sorcerer-Princes ===
Mara
Sorceress-Princess of the Palfang people in the Marsh of Veils. She and Bragon met when they were young, and became lovers. However, while searching for the incantation necessary to stop Ramor, she is corrupted by the promise of divine power, and plots to absorb Ramor's powers to become the ultimate ruler of Akbar. In order to persuade Bragon to search for the Time Bird, she even creates Pelisse as an enticement, only to betray Bragon in the end by revealing her illusionary nature. But right after claiming Ramor's essence for herself, she is killed by the Nest Guardian.
Shan-Tung
The ruler of the Grey Grelets, the people of the Gaping Lands, wielder of the power of lightning, and custodian of Ramor's conch prison. His hope is that, once Ramor re-emerges, his people will be blessed by the renegade god, regain their former warrior ferocity, and thus lay claim to rulership of all Akbar. However, he is killed by Bragon hurling a sword into his head; and in his death-throes, Shan-Tung's unleashed power ends up destroying most of his city and its people.
Bodias
The pompous but friendly Sorcerer-Prince of the March of a Thousand Greens, a lushly forested area, and Bragon's old rival for Mara's hand. A knowledgeable sage, he is asked by Mara to escort Bragon's troupe to the Temple of Oblivion, because only he can read the runes inside the sanctuary which point the way to the Time Bird. Shortly after learning that his fellow Sorcerer-Prince Fjel had attempted to stop Mara because he feared that she is thirsting for Ramor's power, Bodias chastises Fjel harshly and is attacked by the other Jaisirs for his sacrilege. While attempting to help him, the Stranger accidentally hits Bodias with Pelisse's Firey Whip, dooming Bodias to a slow, agonizing death. Bragon and the others bring the dying Prince back to his homeland, which has been consumed by fire just as his own body due to their mutual connection.
Fjel
Fjel is the Sorcerer-Prince and ruler of the Jaisirs, the people of the Desert of Sand Lips. Suspecting (as it turned out, rightfully) that Mara wants to seize divine power, he attempts to have the book of spells she needed to imprison Ramor stolen, only for his forces to be beaten back. The retreating survivors stumble upon Bulrog, who offers to train the Jaisirs in the ways of war, in exchange for Bragon's life. However, when fellow Prince Bodias criticizes him and breaks his staff of office, Fjel realizes that his intentions were folly. To atone for his mistake, he sacrifices himself to a voracious desert predator.
Tharmine
Sorcerer-Prince of the Jivrains, the natives of the White March, a snowy hill land. Originally peaceful and noble, the Jivrains all succumb to a deadly disease which drives its victims mad with cannibalistic bloodthirst before killing them. Tharmine, infected but still in command of his mental facilities, shelters Bragon's company from his murderous subjects, but is killed by an arrow through his throat. Following his demise, Tharmine's estate and extensive archives are taken over by Bulrog, who settles himself down as a hermit and sage.
Humon
Mara's father, and her predecessor as the Sorcerer-Prince of the Palfang. He is murdered by Bragon when the latter was mind-controlled by the Order of Signs.
Ming-Tung
Shan-Tungs father, and the former Sorcerer-Prince of the Grey Grelets. He is mortally wounded by a Llir Warrior hired by the Order of Signs when they try to gain their hands on Ramor's conch, but manages to kill his assassin with his dying breath.

=== Others ===
The Time Bird (L'Oiseau du Temps)
The object of the original quest, a mythical bird-like being embodying the essence of time. When it was first released by the being which later became known as the Guardian of the Nest, it was shot by him before its presence could upset the universal balance; but each time before its demise, it would lay an egg from which another Time Bird would hatch. The repeated slaying of the Bird marks the passage of time on Akbar in the form of the circle of day and night, and its eyes form Akbar's twin moons.
Fol of Dol (Fol de Dol)
A sorcerous, mischievous kobold who rules the Dol, the biggest river and most important landmark of Akbar. While he appears as a rhyme-spouting lunatic at first glance, he is really very shrewd and - with his control of the river's waters - a dangerous enemy to cross. Throughout the Quest series, he challenges Bragon's party with riddles, whose resolution grants them passage to the next section of their search.
The Guardian of the Nest
A godling in the form of a blind child, one of the spawn of the ancient gods of Akbar. In ancient times, he accidentally released the first Time Bird from its egg, upsetting the universal balance; and to make amends for his sin, he regularly slays the bird with bow and arrow, thus creating the circle of day and night on Akbar. When Mara uses the Time Bird's egg to absorb the power of Ramor into herself, he restores the balance before it can be upset by killing Mara with his bow.
Kiskill
A young woman of an unnamed tribe, and the Nest Guardian's companion on the Pointing Peak, a rock spire at the estuary of the river Dol and the resting place of the Time Bird's egg. Rendered immortal, she was tasked with keeping watch over the egg's nest until the first mortal man, destined to be her mate, would arrive and take her virginity, thereby making her mortal again and ending her millennia-long vigil. This very man is the Stranger, who arrives in Bragon's company; she accompanies him for the rest of the quest, and upon its conclusion marries him, making him the new king of Kiskill's people. After a long and happy life, she is confirmed to have passed away from old age at the end of the Quest series.
Galom
A member of the Palfang people, he served her father, Sorcerer-Prince Humon, as an advisor, and continues in that capacity for Mara during the Quest series until she abandons her people for her thirst for divine power.
Javin
Javin was Bragon's first and best friend, a fun-loving wanderer who encountered Bragon on an errand for his family. His love for life enticed Bragon to finally turn his back on his family farm and become an adventurer. The two of them met and befriended Princess Mara, and were assigned to bring down a monstrous Borak for her. At first Javin refused, but he returned in the midst of the hunt to help Bragon in his task. Unfortunately, at the very moment of their reunion he was ambushed by the Borak, and fatally injured by its burning tongue, died in Bragon's arms. The Borak's tongue was fashioned by Mara into the Fiery Whip which her daughter Pelisse wields in the original Quest series.
Riga (Le Rige)
Riga is a reclusive ritual hunter. As a student, he and his master attempted to kill a monster, as they had always done in regular cycles, but in his overconfidence Riga became accidentally responsible for his master's death, and chose exile to atone for his mistake. However, he allowed a legend to grow which stated that he was looking for a successor, prompting many to seek him, either to become his student or simply kill him for fame. When young Bragon came to rescue him from murderous fanatics, and later proved himself in one of Riga's ritual hunts, he took Bragon as his first and only student. When Ramor threatens Akbar decades later, Bragon is forced to cross Riga's territory, for which his old master, seeking a worthy warrior's death, challenges him for one last hunt with Bragon as his prey. In the end, Bragon succeeds in killing his old master in self-defense.
The Order of Signs (L'Ordre des Signes)
An evil sect of fanatics dedicated to Ramor, who seek to enable their deity's return to Akbar.
Kryll
A female Meridinian, and a former member of the Order of Signs. When Bragon fell under the mind control of one of the Order's members and murdered many, including Kryll's adoptive mother, and afterwards started his revenge campaign against the cult, Kryll was assigned to seduce Bragon and assassinate him using her species' most deadly trait: When female Meridinian virgins are deflorated, they secrete a substance which dissolves their mating partner's tissues and bones, leaving only the skin. However, after recognizing Bragon's honor, she turns against the Order and joins Bragon's troupe. Her growing feelings for Bragon, however, are stymied by Bragon's enduring love for Mara.

== Publication ==
=== Original story: La Quête ===
#	Title	Year	Synopsis	ISBN
1	Ramor's Conch (La Conque de Ramor)	1983	Ramor, an evil god imprisoned for millennia, is about to escape his confinement. The Sorceress-Princess Mara sends her daughter Pelisse to her father and Mara's old lover, Knight Bragon, to seek out the mythical Time Bird, the only being that would enable her to complete the magical imprisonment ritual in time. However, Bragon and Pelissa - joined by the mysterious Stranger - must first retrieve Ramor's prison from the clutches of the ambitious Sorcerer-Prince Shan-Tung.	2-205-02406-X
2	The Temple of Oblivion (Le Temple de l'oubli)	1984	While meeting with Mara, Bragon's company learns that the desert-dwelling Jaisir, keepers of the Temple of Oblivion, have launched an attack on Tha, Mara's city, to steal the book of spells needed to confine Ramor. Accompanied by Bragon's old rival, Prince Bodias, they travel to the Desert of Sand Lips both to question Fjel, the Jaisir Sorcerer-Prince, and to enter the Temple to find the place where the Time Bird resides. However, a vengeful Bulrog has joined forces with Fjel to thwart Bragon; and the Temple itself harbors a deadly menace which threatens to consume the company's minds.	2-205-02576-7
3	The Rige (Le Rige)	1985	In order to reach their destination, the Pointing Peak, Bragon, Pelisse, the Stranger and Bulrog are forced to cross the territory of Riga, an enigmatic old warrior and hunter, who has a secret common past with Bragon. However, even with the existence of Akbar at stake, Riga insists on one challenge: Hunt the companions through his domain until they either escape him - or until they die by his hand. Notes: Winner of the Lucien Award at the Festival of Angoulême the following year. Later editions feature a modified cover eliminating an image of Pelisse, tied up in vines, from the background.	2-205-02952-5
4	The Egg of Darkness (L'Œuf des ténèbres)	1987	The companions reach the Time Bird's lair, where they are met by two immortals known as the Nest Guardian and Kiskill. Despite the Guardian's warnings, they manage to get the Time Bird's egg with Kiskill's aid and return to Mara just in time for the imprisonment ceremony. However, as Mara weaves her spell, another sinister plot begins to unfold.	2-205-03460-X

=== Second Cycle (prequel series): Avant la Quête ===
#	Title	Year	Synopsis	ISBN
5	Friend Javin (L'Ami Javin)	1998	This album tells the story of the first meeting and growing friendship between young Bragon and the wanderer Javin, their travels and first meeting with Princess Mara of the Palfang, and how Bragon slew the Borak who killed his best friend. Notes: A sketchbook (Esquisses - L'ami Javin) was published parallel to the album.	2-205-04394-3
6	The Book of the Gods (Le Grimoire des Dieux)	2007	A band of assassins leaving an unknown sigil as a calling sign is killing the offspring of Akbar's sorcerer princes one by one. Humon, Sorcerer Prince of the Palfang, sends his daughter Mara out to retrieve the Book of the Gods from its hiding place to counter this unprecedented threat. Meanwhile, having learned all he can from the best fighting masters among the Palfang, Bragon departs to find himself the ultimate teacher. While Bragon and Mara's paths are initially separate from each other, they ultimately intertwine as they get near their final destination.	978-2-205-05633-4
7	The Way of The Rige (La Voie du Rige)	2010	Having heard of an enigmatic warrior called Riga, a recluse of great fame who has beaten every warrior who has ever come for him, Bragon decides to seek him out. When a band of fanatics from the Order of the Sign seeks to slay Rige for fame, Bragon moves to intercept them. Encountering Riga, Bragon is used by him in a ceremionial hunt and, after proving his endurance and will to survive, becomes his first student.	978-2-205-06009-6
8	The Knight Bragon (Le Chevalier Bragon)	2013	Bragon completes his training with Riga, and returns to meet old friends and a new one: Bulrog, his first student. However, he immediately becomes embroiled in the schemes of the Order of Signs, who seek to kill all who would oppose their master, Ramor.	978-2-205-06330-1
9	The Grip (L'Emprise)	2017	After an attempt on their lives, Bragon and Bulrog hide from the Order of Signs to regroup; but the Order finds them and uses one of their newest recruits to control Bragon's mind. Under their baleful influence, Bragon is forced to rise against all he loves, a dark purpose which will change his life forever.	978-2-205-07578-6
10	Kryll	2020	Following his liberation from the Order's mind control, Bragon embarks on a revenge campaign against them, killing all Order members he encounters and assembling a group willing to fight by his side. In order to stop him, the Order assigns Kryll, one of their members, to seduce Bragon and kill him with her race's most infamous trait, while Bragon and his companions strive to keep the Order from gaining their hands on Ramor's conch.	978-2-205-07960-9
11	Crazy Seed (Folle Graine)	2022	Rochemart, leader of a band of raiders from the Order of Signs, begins testing a new technique which turns the Order's members into relentless killing machines. Bragon, Bulrog and Kryll reunite with Mara and Bodias to fetch a sentient seed, whose magical properties would forestall the coming of Ramor and thus foil the Order's plans.	978-2-205-20211-3
12	Omegon (L'Omegon)	2024	Prince Bodias determines that the ideal place to sprout the sacred seed is the Omegon, the mythical court of justice of the Elder Gods. As the companions prepare for a final quest, Kryll discovers that Mara is pregnant with Bragon's child.	978-2-205-20842-9

=== Third Circle (sequel series): Cycle Troisième : Après la Quête ===
In 2006 Loisel and Le Tendre announced the upcoming publication of a third circle, planned to consist of only one or two albums. It is set to deal with the final days and death of Bragon, still lost in his madness after Pelisse's demise.

== Translations ==
The series have been translated into several languages, including Croatian, Spanish, German, Danish, Dutch, Swedish, Polish, Czech and Serbian. An English translation titled Roxanna and The Quest For The Time Bird was published in the late 80's by NBM.

In December 2015, Titan Comics released the hardcover collected edition of The Quest For The Time Bird (232 pages, Titan Comics, hardcover, December 2015, ISBN 1-7827-6362-7).

== In other media ==
A computer game version was released for 16-bit home computers (Amiga, Atari ST, and DOS) by Infogrames in 1989.
