= Makyo (comics) =

French comic writer

Pierre Fournier
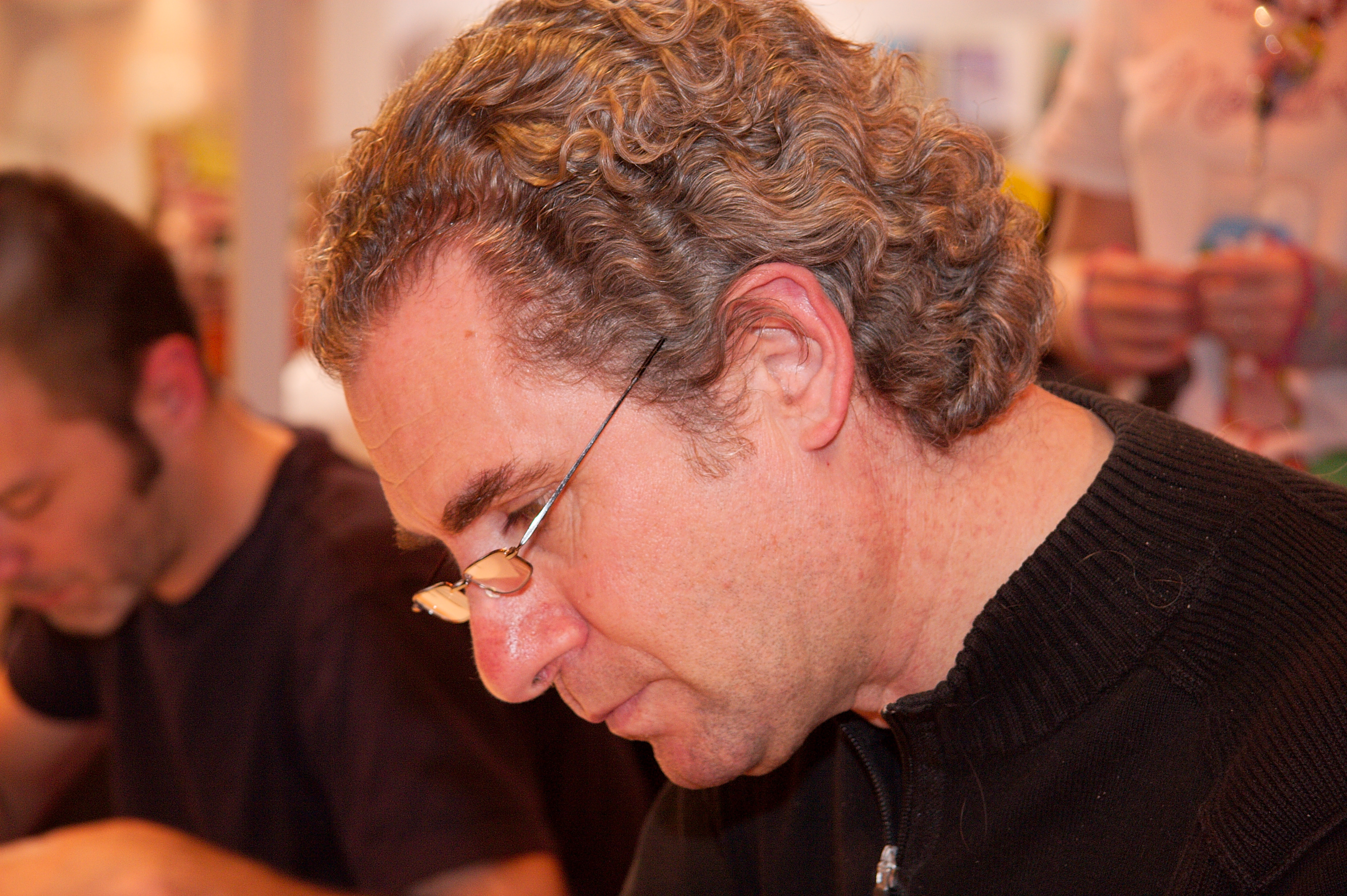
- Pierre Makyo at a book fair in Paris, France, in March 2008.
- Born: 16 July 1952 (age 74)
- Pseudonyms: Makyo, Mohat
- Notable works: Jérôme K. Jérôme Bloche; La Balade au Bout du monde

Pierre Fournier (born 16 July 1952) is a French comics writer and comics artist, working under the pen name Makyo. He is best known as the initial author of the series Jérôme K. Jérôme Bloche and La Balade au Bout du monde.
