= Marion Montaigne =

French cartoonist (born 1980)

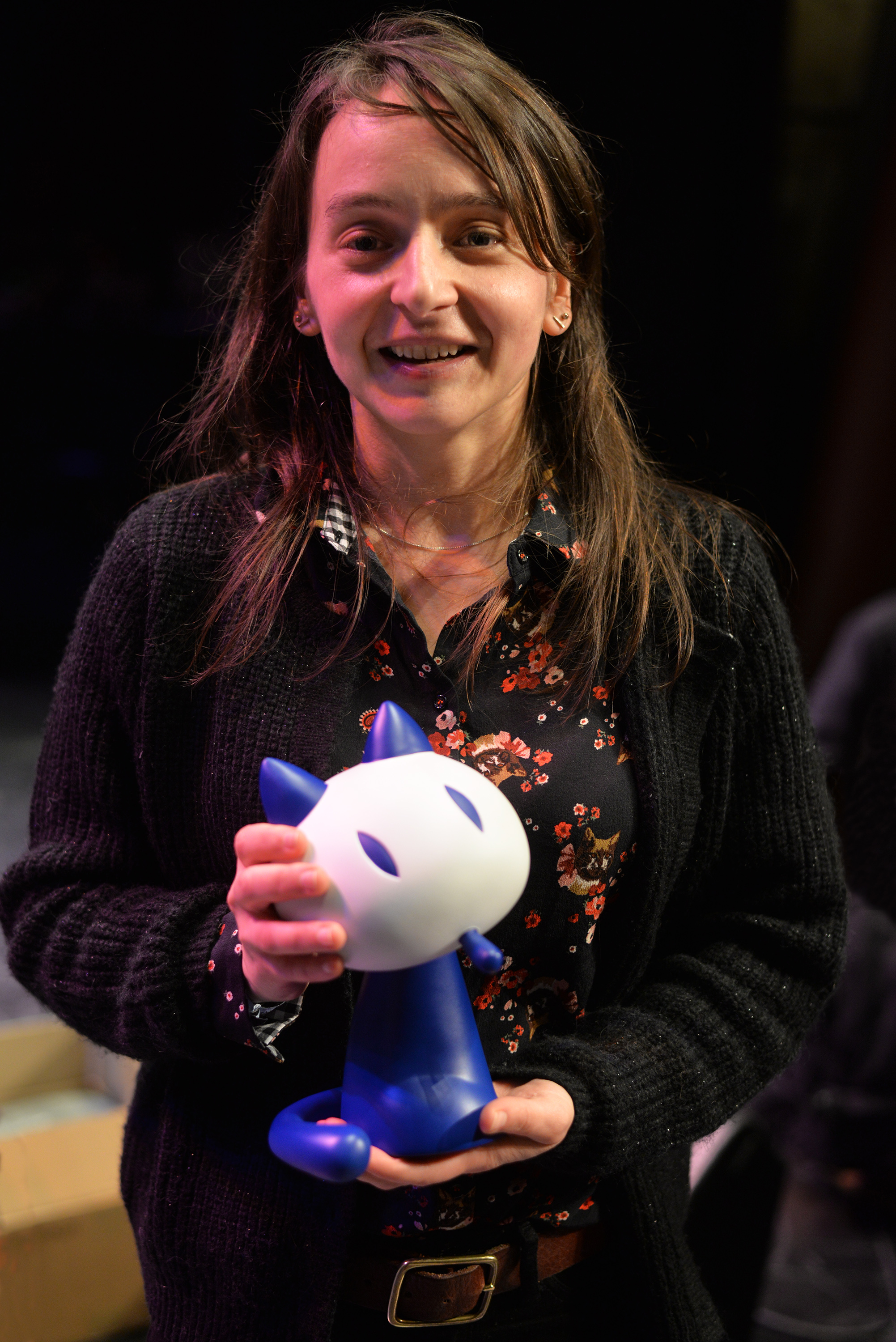
- Montaigne at the Angoulême festival in 2018
- Born: 8 April 1980 (age 45)
- Occupation: Cartoonist

Marion Montaigne (born April 8, 1980) is a French cartoonist, known particularly for her popular science comics.

She was born in Saint-Denis de la Réunion. She studied animated cartoon at Paris Gobelins school. Her first famous work is the science blog BD Tu mourras moins bête, started in 2008. Tu mourras moins bête is now published as books and adapted since 2016 as an animated cartoon for TV channel Arte.

== Bibliography ==
- Panique organique, Sarbacane, 2007.
- La Vie des très bêtes, Bayard, 2008.
- La Vie des très bêtes. Ils reviennent !, Bayard, 2010.
- Tu mourras moins bête...:
  1. La science, c'est pas du cinéma !, Ankama, 2011.
  2. Quoi de neuf, docteur Moustache ?, Ankama, 2012.
  3. Science un jour, Science toujours !, Delcourt, 2014.
  4. Professeur Moustache étale sa science !, Delcourt, 2015.
  5. Quand y'en a plus, y'en a encore !, Delcourt, 2019.
  6. In Moustachum veritas, Delcourt, 2024
- Riche, pourquoi pas toi ? with Michel Pinçon and Monique Pinçon Charlot, 2013, Dargaud.
- Bizarrama culturologique, 2015, Delcourt.
- L'Intelligence artificielle with Jean-Noël Lafargue, 2016, Le Lombard.
- Dans la combi de Thomas Pesquet, 2017, Dargaud
- Nos mondes perdus, Dargaud, 2023
