= G. E. Ranne =

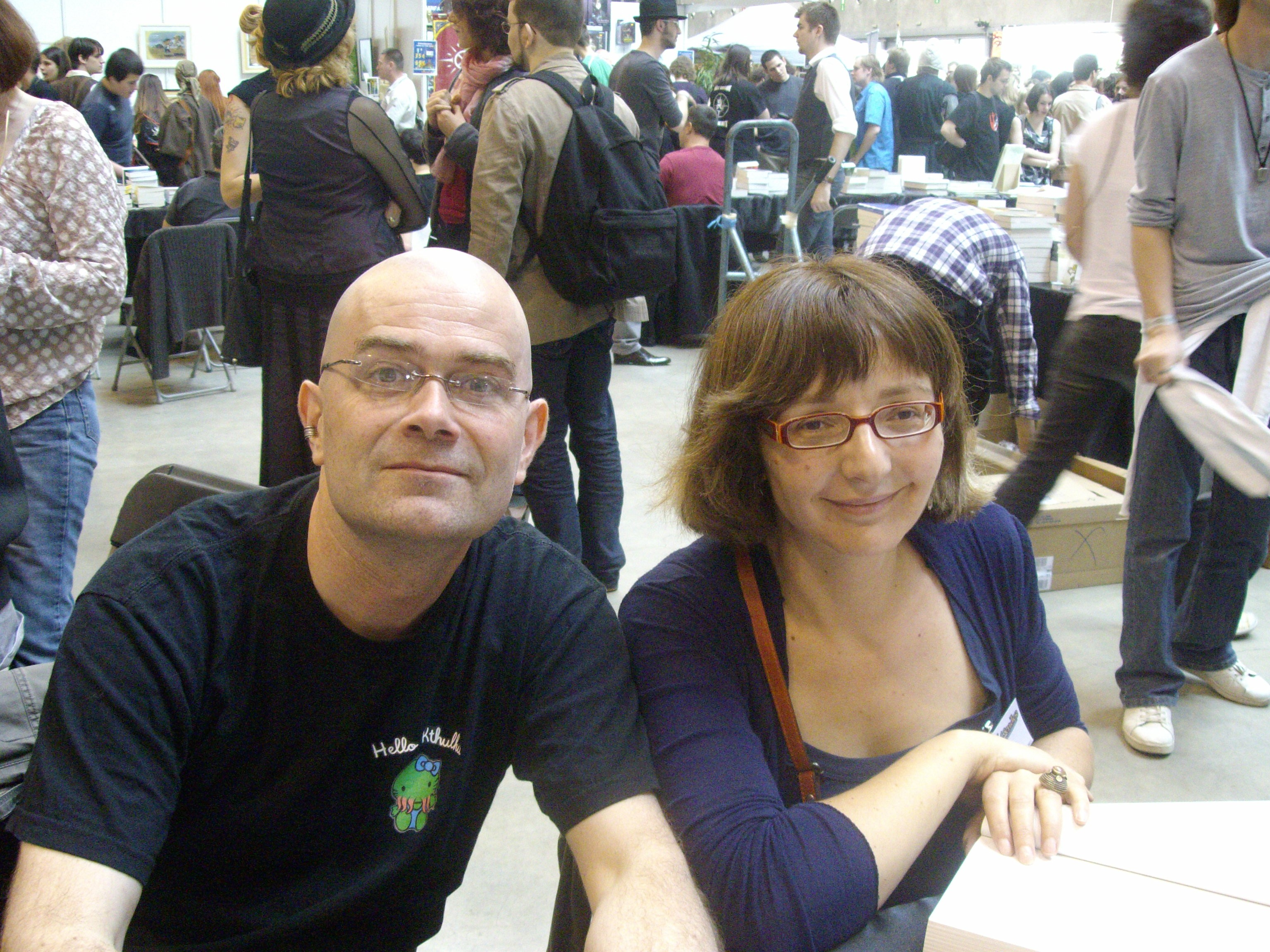
Ange in 2011

G.E. Ranne is a pseudonym used by a pair of French authors, also known as Ange (Angel), who primarily write science fiction. They have written texts for role-playing games including In Nomine Satanis/Magna Veritas.

In 1998, Ranne gained notice with the short story "Il était trois petits enfants", published in Fantasy 18 grands récits de merveilleux.

== Science fiction novels as G.E. Ranne ==
- Le silence est d'or
- Un regard vertical
- La machoire du dragon
- Chute libre

They also write medieval fantasy and comic book scripts for the comic book artist Varanda under the pseudonym Ange (Angel).

== Fantasy novels as Ange ==
- Le peuple turquoise (Part 1 of Les trois lunes de Tanjore)
- La flamme d'Harabec (Part 2 of Les trois lunes de Tanjore)
