= Claude Moliterni =

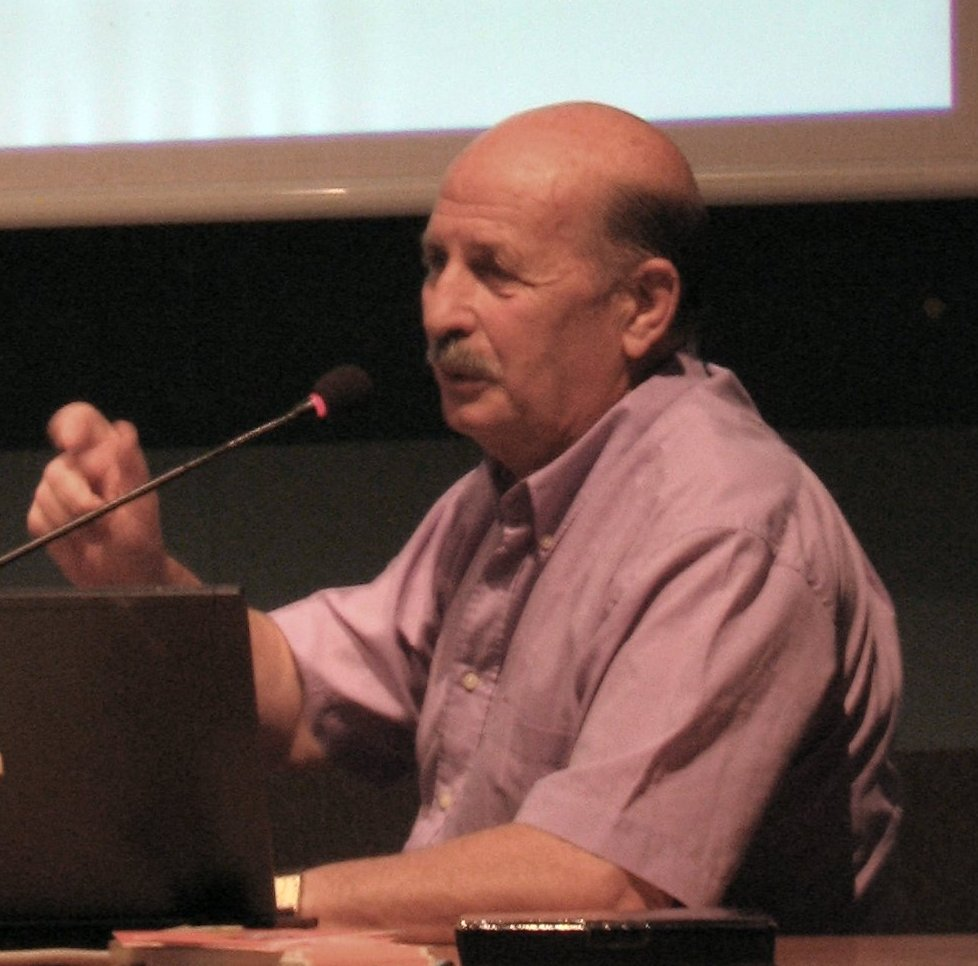
- Born: Fidèle Simon Claude Moliterni; 21 November 1932; 15th arrondissement of Paris
- Died: 21 January 2009; 5th arrondissement of Paris
- Occupation: Photographer
- Awards: (2005)

Claude Moliterni (21 November 1932 — 21 January 2009) was a French editor, writer, comic book writer, critic, and historian. He was one of the founders of the Angoulême International Comics Festival, in 1974.

== Life and career ==
=== Education ===
Claude Moliterni studied at the École nationale des chartes.

=== Career ===
Moliterni started working at Hachette in 1955 as a researcher; in the early 1960 he joined CELEG, a group of comics enthusiasts, from which he left in 1966 to found a rival group, Socerlid, of which he was president and was editor of its magazine, Phénix, until its end in 1977.

He wrote detective novels under several pseudonyms and produced crime series for Radio Luxembourg, as well as recorded books.

==== Exhibitions and salons ====
In 1965, he organized « Dix millions d'images : l'âge d'or de la BD » (Ten million images: the Golden Age of BD), the first major bande dessinée exhibition in France, held in Paris. He also co-founded the Salone Internazionale dei Fumetti in Italy, which held its first edition in 1965. In 1967, he organized at the musée des Arts décoratifs de Paris the traveling exhibition « Bande dessinée et Figuration narrative », which moved to Angoulême in 1972.

Together with Francis Groux and Jean Mardikian, he founded the “Jeudis de la BD” (Comic Book Thursdays) in 1972 as part of the Quinzaine de la lecture (Reading Forthnight), which was a “considerable success”.

A co-founder of the Chambéry International Comics Festival in 1967, Molterni—who was one of the organizers of the Lucca Comics Convention, the largest in Europe—took Groux and Mardikian there in late 1973. Drawing inspiration from this model, the three of them launched the Angoulême International Comics Festival, the first edition of which took place in January 1974 and was an "immediate success".

From 1965 to 2005, he held around 200 exhibitions with comics artists such as Burne Hogarth, Milton Caniff, Will Eisner, Philippe Druillet, Jean Giraud, Franquin, and Hugo Pratt.

==== Editor ====
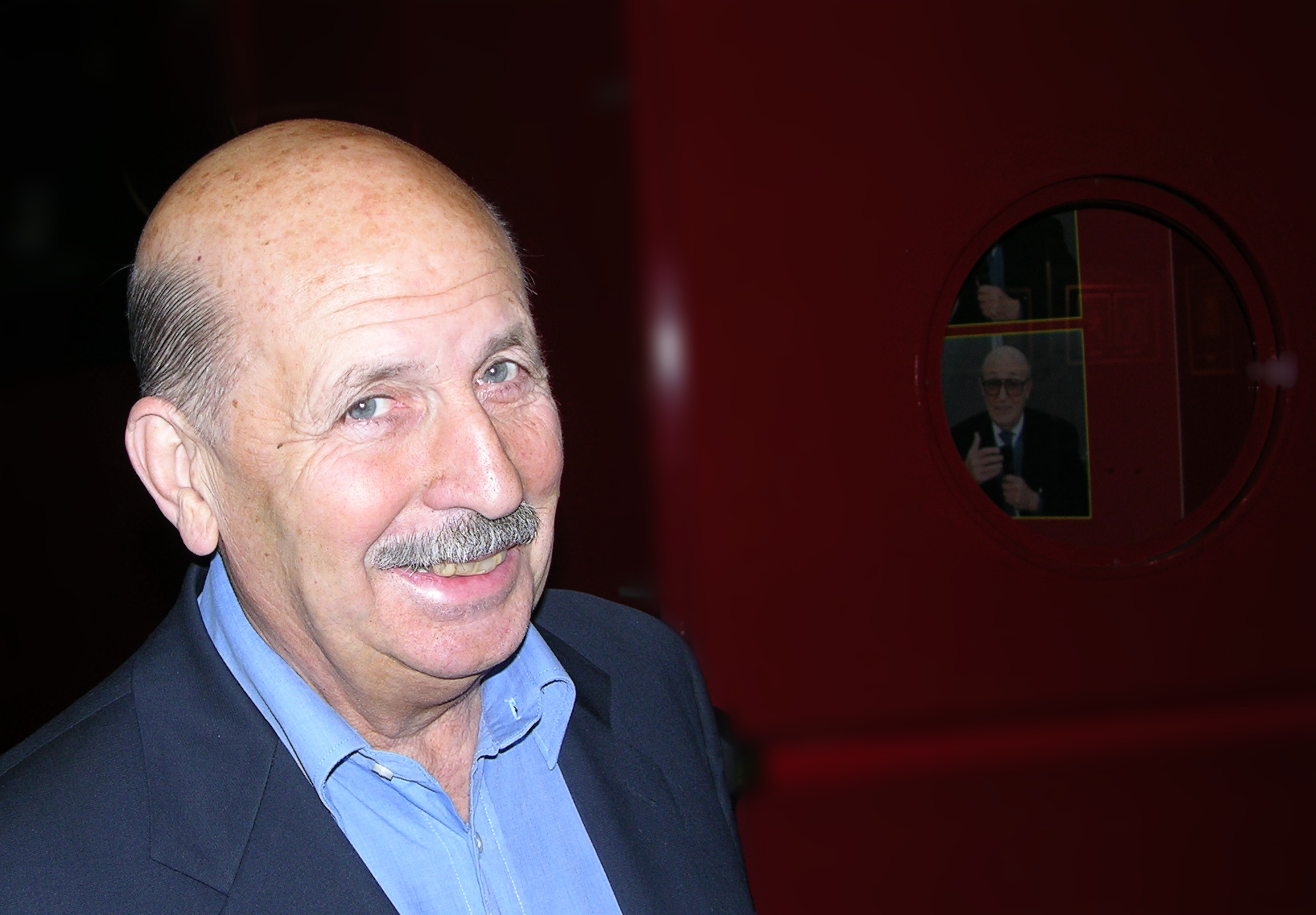
Claude Moliterni at Torino Comics 2005.

In 1973, Moliterni became chief editor at Dargaud, a position he held until 1989 and left to work at Gautier-Languereau.

In 1990, he founded his own publishing house Bagheera, which closed in 1998.

Moliterni wrote several reference works on comics like Aventure de la bande dessinée (Gallimard), Dictionnaire mondial de la bande dessinée, Encyclopédie de la bande dessinée (1974), Histoire mondiale de la bande dessinée (1990), and Les Aventures de la BD (1996).

In 2000, he cofounded the web website BDzoom.

==== Comics writer ====
Since the late 1960s, he has also combined his work as a specialist and publisher with that of a scriptwriter, first with Robert Gigi, then with other artists starting in 1975—he wrote a total of about twenty genre-based or promotional comic books. He was also the editorial director for comic book magazines such as Pogo/Poco, Les Pieds nickelés magazine, Pilote, Charlie Mensuel, Lucky Luke, etc.

=== Homage ===
Throughout his life, Moliterni worked to promote the recognition and popularity of comic books in France.

For Le Monde, cultural columnist Yves-Marie Labé describes him as “first and foremost, an encyclopedist and a pioneer”.
